= Cabanatuan =

Component city in Nueva Ecija, Philippines

- Component city
- City of Cabanatuan
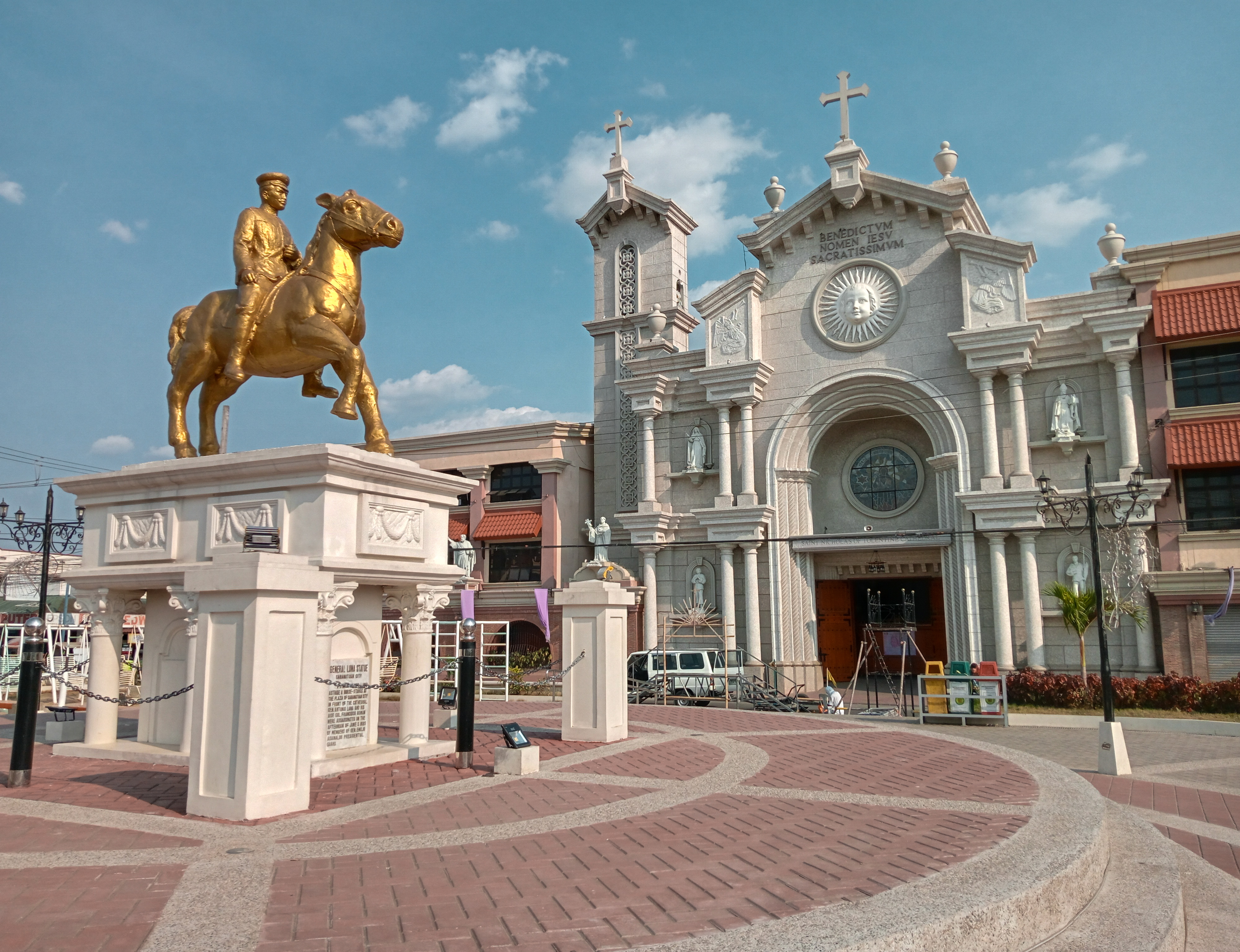
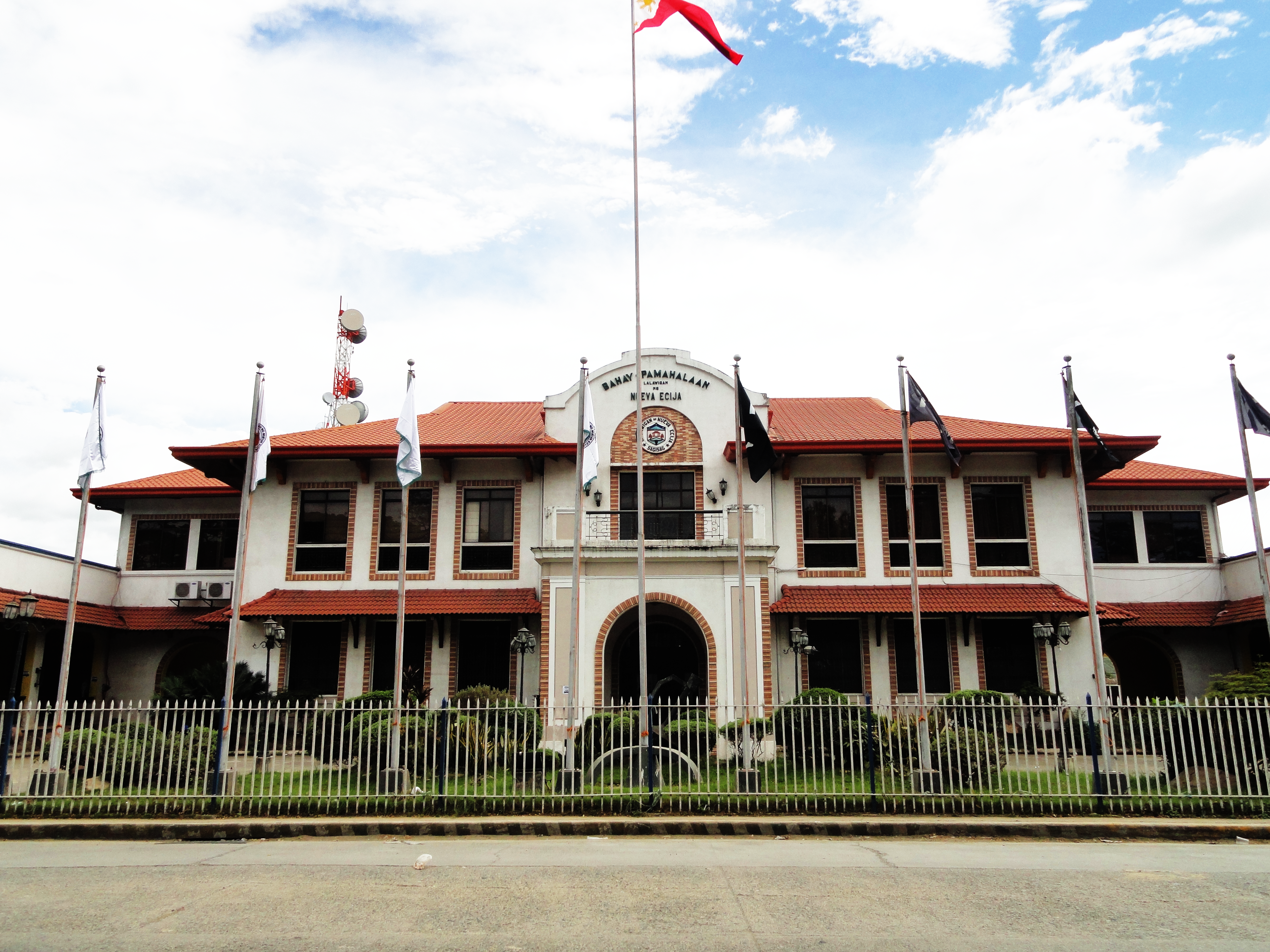
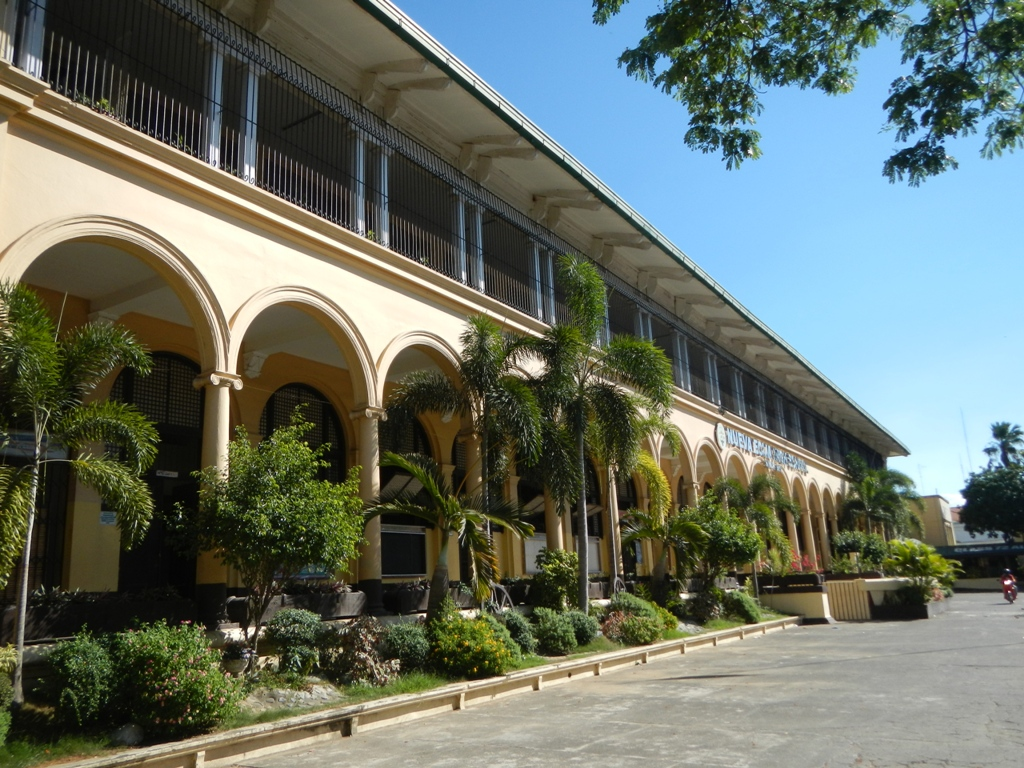
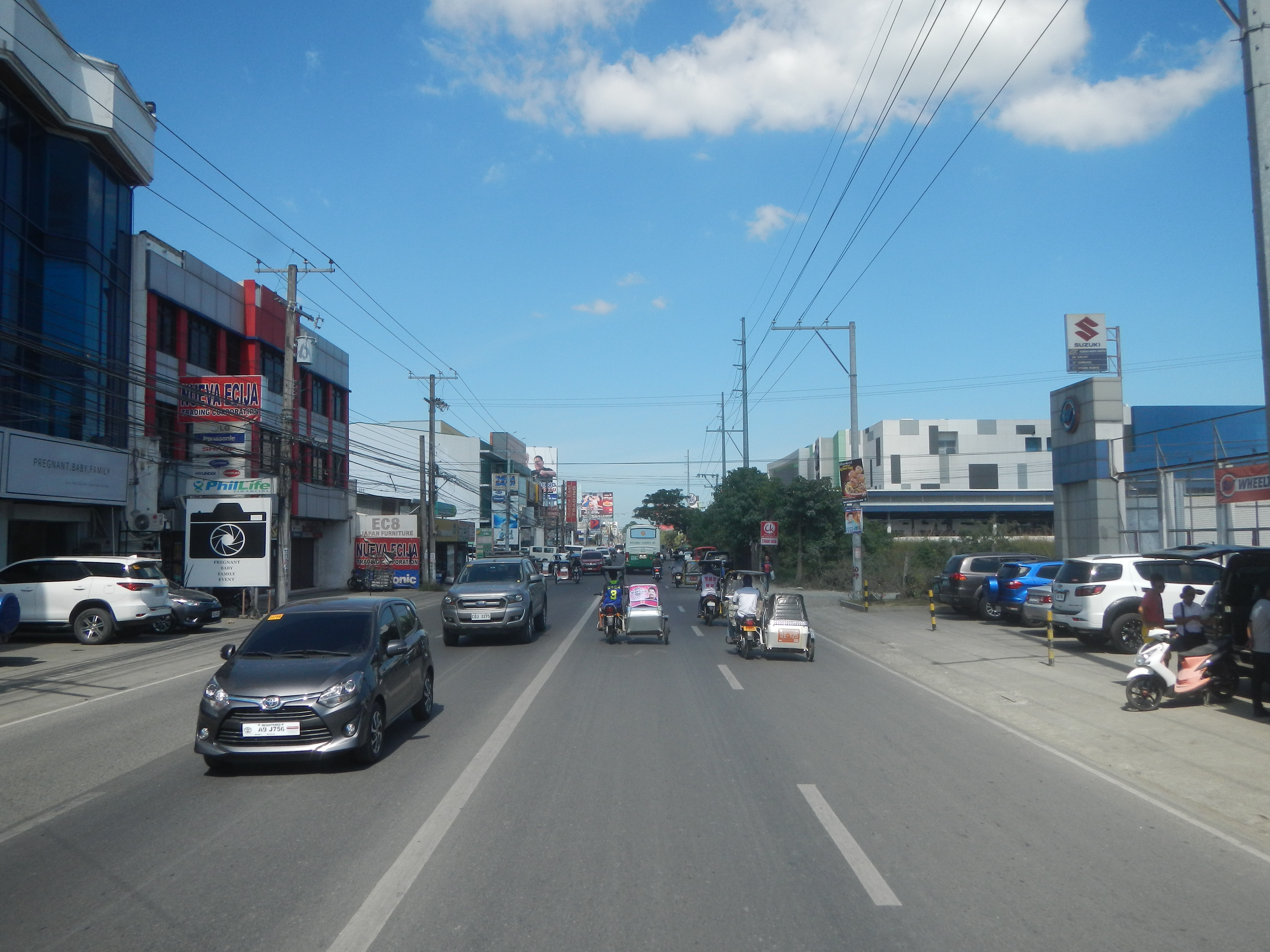
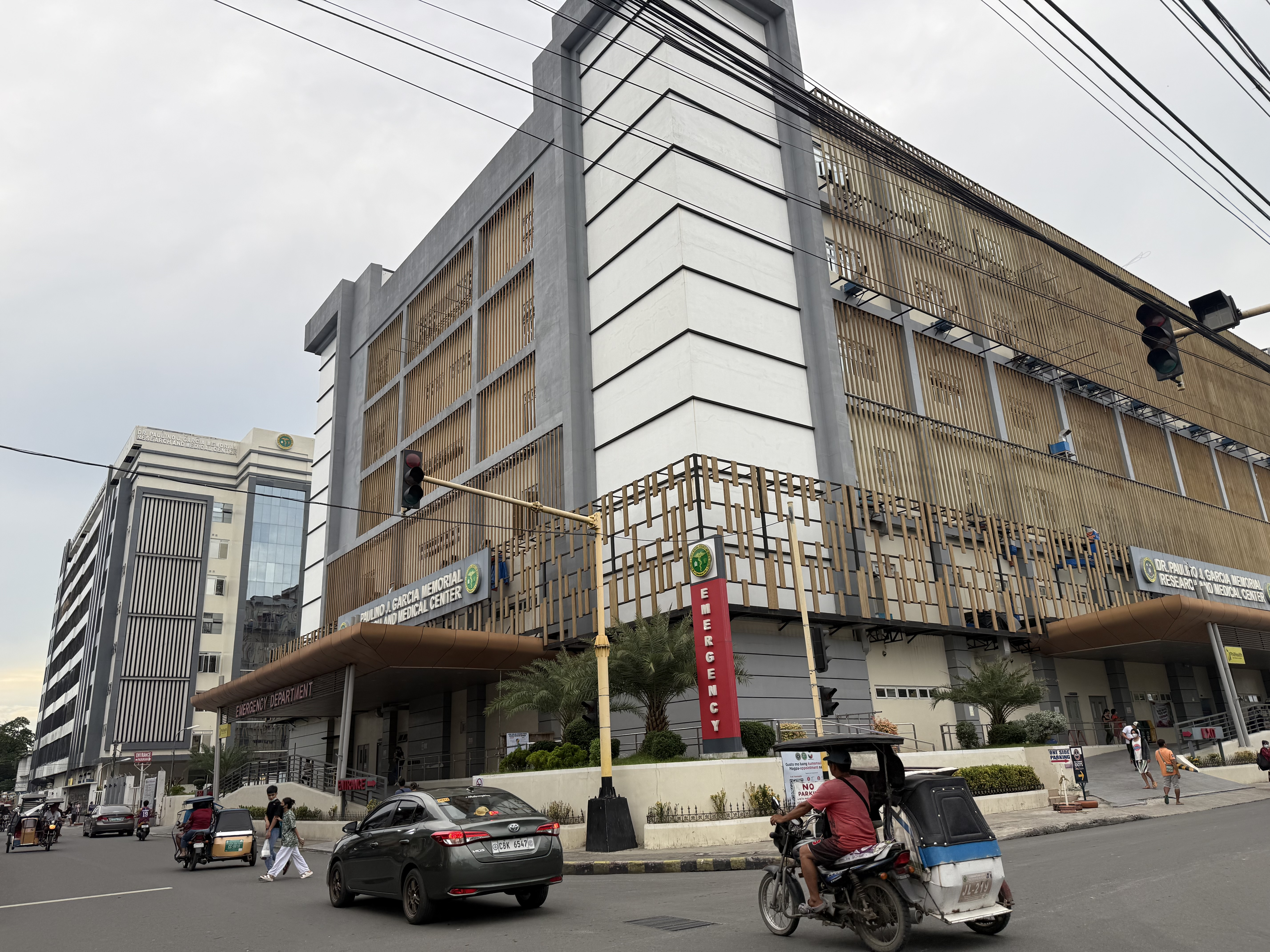
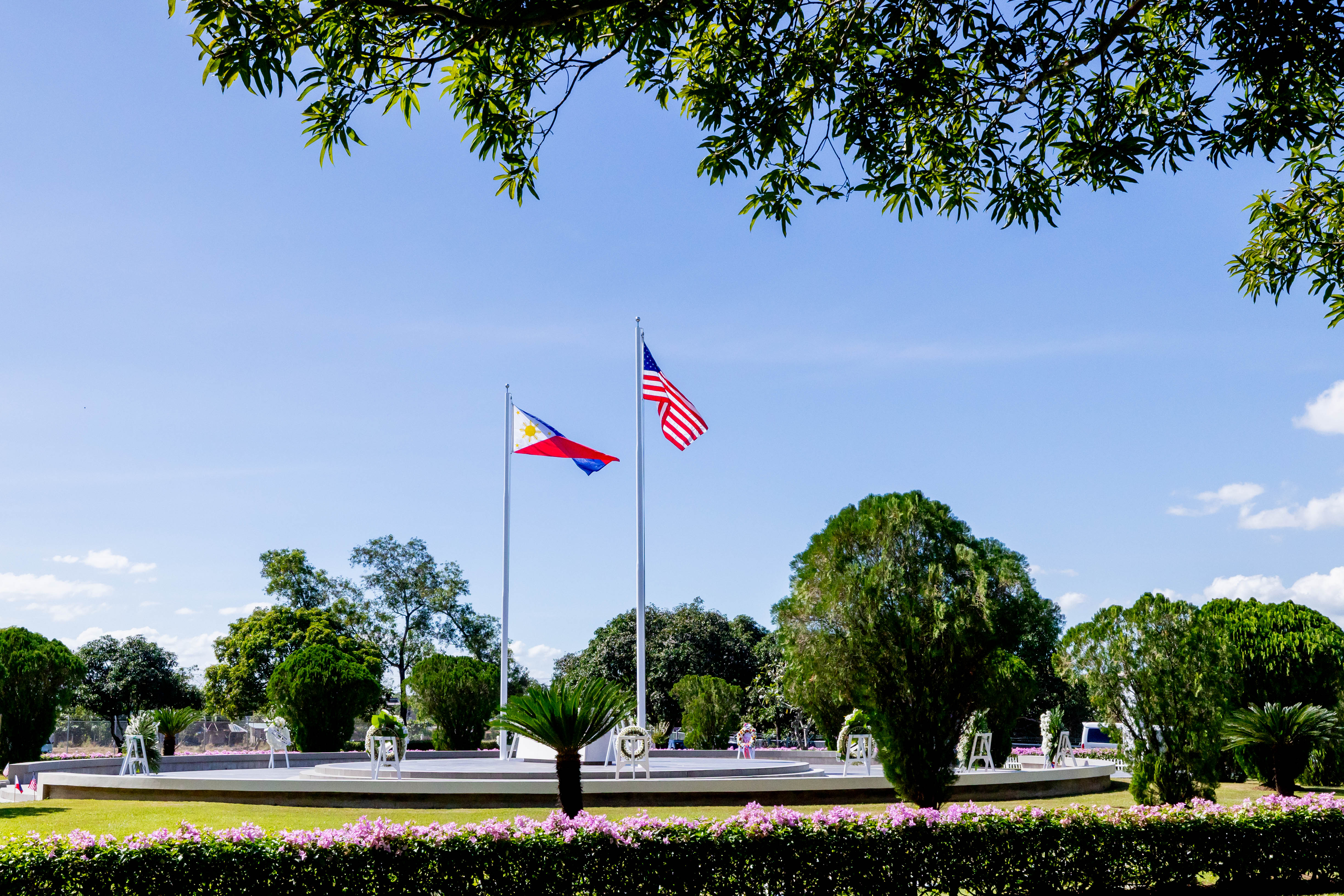
- From top to bottom, left to right: General Luna Statue in front of Cabanatuan Cathedral, Old Nueva Ecija Provincial Capitol, Nueva Ecija High School, Pan-Philippine Highway, Dr. Paulino J. Garcia Memorial Research and Medical Center, Cabanatuan American Memorial

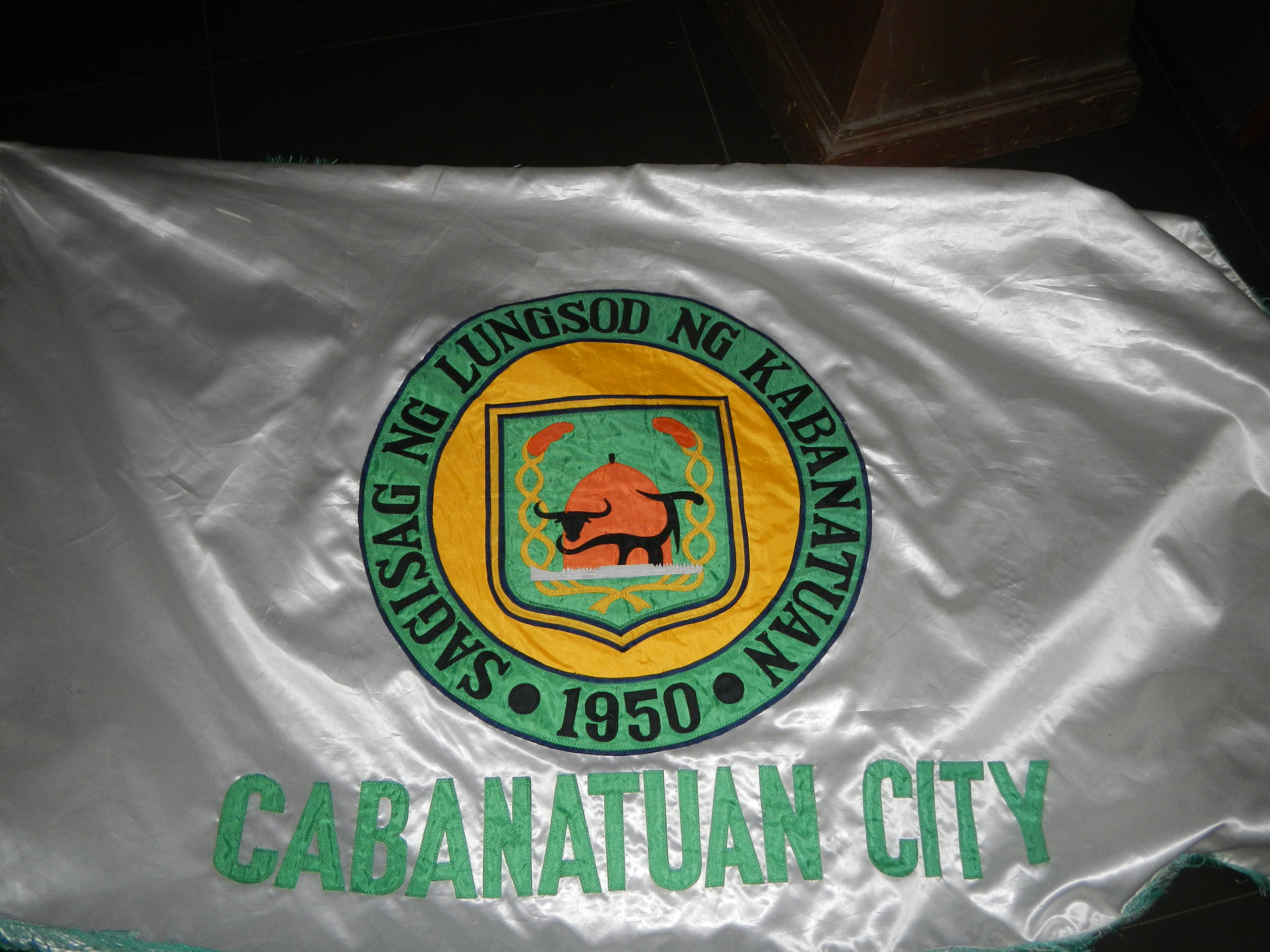
- Flag Seal
- Nicknames: Tricycle Capital of the Philippines; Gateway to the North
- Motto: Pagbabago, Progreso, Disiplina
- Map of Nueva Ecija with Cabanatuan highlighted
- Interactive map of Cabanatuan
- Location within the Philippines
- Coordinates: 15°29′27″N 120°58′04″E
- Country: Philippines
- Region: Central Luzon
- Province: Nueva Ecija
- District: 3rd district
- Founded: 1750
- Cityhood: June 15, 1950
- Barangays: 89 (see Barangays)

Government
  - Type: Sangguniang Panlungsod
  - Mayor: Myca Elizabeth R. Vergara (PFP)
  - Vice Mayor: Joselito C. Roque (PFP)
  - Representative: Julius Cesar V. Vergara (PFP)
  - City Council: Members: Jo-Mario Angelo E. Matias; Jean Yasmin D. Cruz; Marius A. Garcia; Aldwin Joseph V. Diaz; Oscar M. Mendoza; Jojo B. Valino; Epifanio G. Posada; Medel R. Seeping; Christian Jan G. Cecilio; Emmanuel D. Liwag II
  - Electorate: 244,298 voters (2025)

Area
  - Total: 192.29 km^{2} (74.24 sq mi)
- Elevation: 52 m (171 ft)
- Highest elevation: 393 m (1,289 ft)
- Lowest elevation: 12 m (39 ft)

Population (2024 census)
  - Total: 343,672
  - Density: 1,787.3/km^{2} (4,629.0/sq mi)
  - Households: 81,792
- Demonym(s): Cabanatueños (Male), Cabanatueñas (Female)

Economy
  - Income class: 1st city income class
  - Poverty incidence: 8.44% (2023)
  - Revenue: ₱ 2,469 million (2024)
  - Assets: ₱ 9,647 million (2024)
  - Expenditure: ₱ 2,210 million (2024)
  - Liabilities: ₱ 507.4 million (2024)

Service provider
  - Electricity: Cabanatuan Electric Corporation (CELCOR)
- Time zone: UTC+8 (PST)
- ZIP code: 3100
- PSGC: 034903000
- IDD : area code: +63 (0)44
- Native languages: Tagalog (predominant), other languages with limited presence include Ilocano, Kapampangan and Sinama
- Website: www.cabanatuancity.gov.ph

Cabanatuan, officially the City of Cabanatuan (Filipino: Lungsod ng Cabanatuan; Ilocano: Siudad ti Cabanatuan; Kapampangan: Lakanbalen/Ciudad ning Cabanatuan), is a component city in the province of Nueva Ecija, Philippines.

According to the 2024 census, it has a population of 343,672 people, making it the most populous in Nueva Ecija, seventh in the whole of Luzon outside the Greater Manila Area, and the largest city north of Metro Manila along the Pan-Philippine Highway (AH26). It has earned the moniker "Gateway to the North."

The city is known for being home to more than 30,000 motorized tricycles, making it the "Tricycle Capital of the Philippines." Its strategic location along the Cagayan Valley Road has helped make the city into the major economic, educational, medical, entertainment, shopping, and transportation center it is today. It is the commercial center for Nueva Ecija and nearby provinces in the region such as Tarlac, Aurora, and Bulacan.

Cabanatuan remained Nueva Ecija's capital until 1965 when the government recognized nearby Palayan City as the new provincial capital. Nueva Ecija's old capitol and other government offices are still used and maintained by the provincial administration. Cabanatuan also briefly became the capital of the Philippines during the First Philippine Republic while President Emilio Aguinaldo was moving north to evade capture by American forces.

After the campaign for the city's designation as a highly urbanized city failed, a motion was made to convert the city into a lone district instead.

== History ==
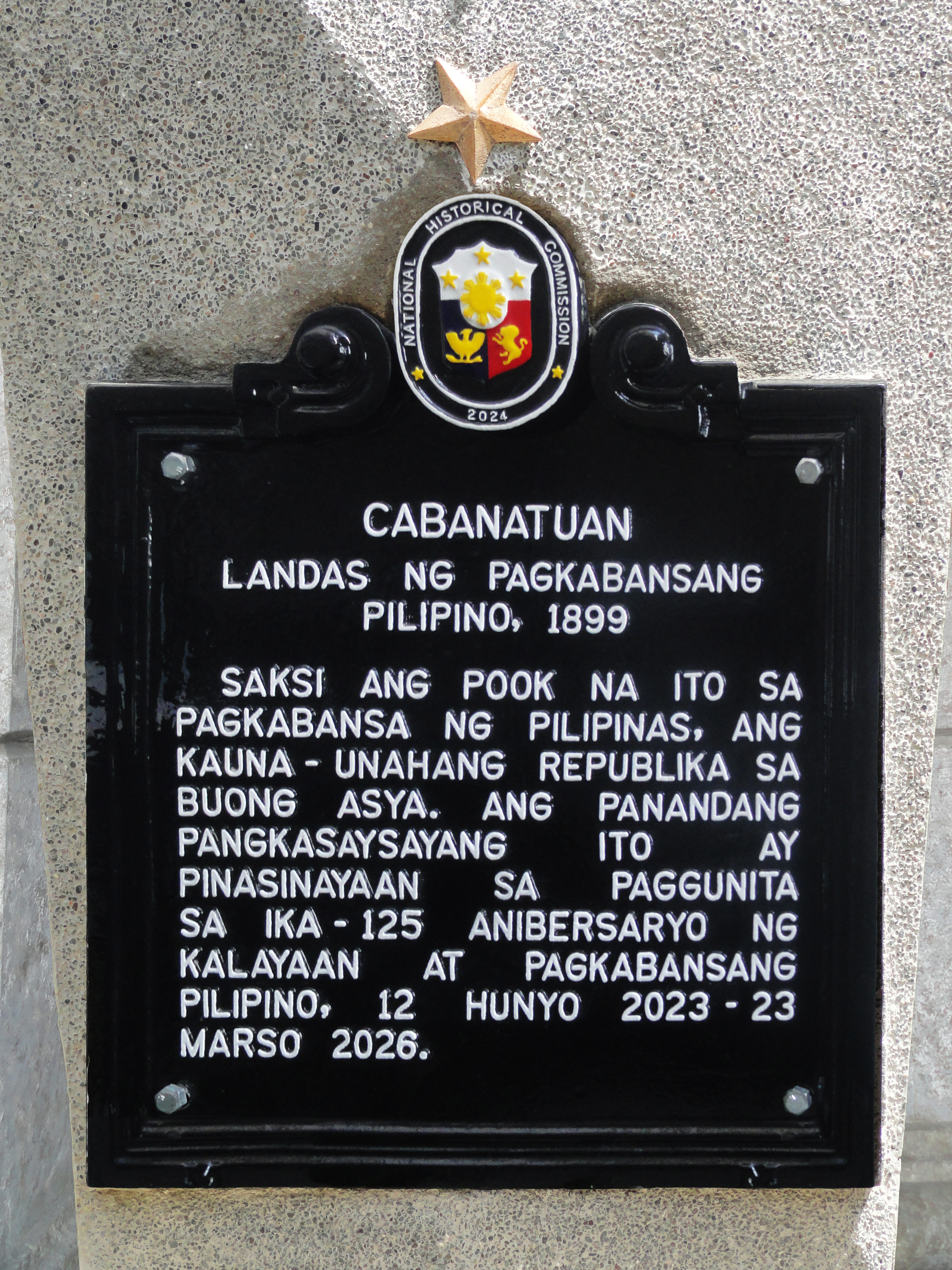
Cabanatuan 1899 Historical Marker

Cabanatuan was founded as a Barrio of Gapan in 1750 and became a municipality and capital of La Provincia de Nueva Ecija in 1780. Majority of the original settlers of Cabanatuan were Tagalogs from Bulacan and Morong (Rizal Province); other early settlers came from Ilocos, Pampanga and Tayabas (now Quezon Province). The Tagalogs settled the barrios on the western part while Kapampangans and Ilocanos settled in the vicinity around Sangitan.

Cabanatuan is the site of the historical "Plaza Lucero" and the Cabanatuan Cathedral, where General Antonio Luna was assassinated by Captain Pedro Janolino and members of the Kawit battalion. Cabanatuan lost the title of provincial capital in 1850 when the capital of Nueva Ecija was moved to San Isidro, another historic town. It was only in 1917, when the administrative code was enacted, that Cabanatuan was restored as capital of the province. In 1926, the historic College of the Immaculate Conception was established within the vicinity of the Cabanatuan Cathedral by the Roman Catholic Church. In 1938, Ling Hong Temple, the second oldest Buddhist temple in the Philippines, was established in Cabanatuan.

During World War II, the occupying Japanese built the Cabanatuan Prison Camp, where many American soldiers were imprisoned, some of whom had been forced to endure the infamous Bataan Death March. In January 1945, elements of the U.S. Army 6th Ranger Battalion and two teams of Alamo Scouts marched 30 miles (48 km) behind enemy lines to rescue the prisoners in what became known as the Raid at Cabanatuan. As a result of the raid on January 30, 1945, victorious Filipino guerrillas, American troops of the U.S. Army 6th Ranger Battalion and Alamo Scouts celebrated having obtained the freedom of 500 American prisoners of war. Soon thereafter, Philippine and American forces re-established the presence of military general headquarters and military camp bases of the Philippine Commonwealth Army, Philippine Constabulary 2nd Constabulary Regiment, and the United States Army in Cabanatuan from February 1, 1945, to June 30, 1946, during the Liberation of the Philippines. Before long, the combined Philippine Commonwealth and American armed forces, in cooperation with local guerrilla resistance fighters and Hukbalahap Communist guerrillas, had liberated Central Luzon from Japanese Imperial forces, a campaign that lasted from January until August 1945.

In 1957, the barrios of Mataas na Kahoy, Balangkare Norte, Balangkare Sur, Sapang Kawayan, Magasawang Sampaloc, Talabutab Norte, Talabutab Sur, Platero, Belen, Pecaleon, Piñahan, Kabulihan, Pasong-Hari, Balaring, Pulong Singkamas, Panaksak, Bravo, Sapang Bato, Burol, Miller, Tila Patio, Pula, Carinay, and Acacia were separated from Cabanatuan and constituted into a separate and independent municipality known as General Mamerto Natividad.

=== 1990 Luzon earthquake ===
Cabanatuan was near the epicenter of the 1990 Luzon earthquake, which registered a 7.8 on the surface wave magnitude scale, at around 3:00 pm on July 16, 1990. The quake leveled several buildings, most notably the Christian College of the Philippines (Liwag Colleges) in the midst of class time, trapping 250 students and teachers and killing at least 133.

Unlike in Baguio, local and international journalists were able to arrive at Cabanatuan hours after the tremor, and media coverage of the quake in its immediate aftermath centered on the collapsed school, where rescue efforts were hampered by the lack of heavy equipment to cut through the steel reinforcement of fallen concrete.

=== Cityhood ===
Cabanatuan became a city by virtue of Republic Act No. 526, approved on June 16, 1950. In 1965, Congress created Palayan City, and transferred the capital of Nueva Ecija from Cabanatuan to the newly created city of Palayan.

==== Highly Urbanized City (HUC) ====
In 1998, Cabanatuan was declared a highly urbanized city by President Fidel V. Ramos. However, it failed ratification after the majority of votes in the plebiscite was negative.

Cabanatuan was declared as a highly urbanized city again by President Benigno S. Aquino III under Presidential Proclamation No. 418 on July 14, 2012. A plebiscite scheduled in December 2012 was moved by the Commission on Elections to January 25, 2014, so as not to burden the poll body during its preparation for the 2013 local elections in the province. Incumbent Governor Aurelio Matias Umali, who had a strong voter base in the city, opposed the conversion and submitted a petition to the Supreme Court. The Supreme Court issued a temporary restraining order on January 24, 2014. On April 23, 2014, voting 9–5–1, the Supreme Court granted a petition for certiorari filed by Nueva Ecija Gov. Aurelio Umali and declared as null and void Comelec Minute Resolution No. 12-0797 dated September 11, 2012, and Minute Resolution No. 12-0925 dated October 16, 2012, setting a date for the conduct of a plebiscite in which only registered voters of Cabanatuan would be allowed to vote. The province-wide plebiscite was rescheduled for November 8, 2014, but cancelled again because the Cabanatuan City government could not provide the necessary funds. No new date is to be set until the city government certifies that ₱101 million is available for the holding of the plebiscite.

== Geography ==
Cabanatuan is located in the rolling central plains of Luzon drained by the Pampanga River. The city stands 14 kilometres (8.7 mi) southwest of the provincial capital Palayan City and 116 kilometres (72 mi) north of Manila. It is bordered by Santa Rosa to the south, Talavera and Gen. Mamerto Natividad to the north, Palayan to the north east, Laur to the east, and Aliaga to the west.

=== Climate and natural disasters ===
Cabanatuan has a tropical wet and dry climate (Köppen climate classification: Aw), with year-round warm weather and distinct dry and wet seasons. It is touted as one of the hottest cities in the country; in the summer season of 2011 Cabanatuan reached its hottest temperature at 39.8 °C, also the hottest in the Philippines in that same year, and on June 4, 2015 PAGASA reported a 53 °C (127 °F) heat index for the city, which is the hottest yet recorded.

According to the fifth Annual Natural Hazards Risk Atlas (NHRA) report in 2015, Cabanatuan was ranked as the sixth city in the Philippines with extreme exposure to a myriad of natural hazards, especially typhoons and flooding.

Notable disasters have struck Cabanatuan in the past decades, including the 1990 Luzon earthquake, 2013 Typhoon Santi, and 2015 Typhoon Lando. The 2013 Typhoon Santi brought extreme winds measuring up to 120 km/h, causing widespread infrastructure damages and power loss to the city.

Later in 2015, Typhoon Lando caused massive damage in the form of severe flooding in Central Luzon, including Cabanatuan. The city experienced severe flooding, which hampered the operations of many establishments. Most roads going to the major districts of Cabanatuan were not passable to light vehicles for two to three days after the storm.

Recently in 2022, Typhoon Karding damaged numerous establishments, farmlands, and electric lines in the city.

Climate data for Cabanatuan (rainfall and humidity 1991–2018, temperature 1981–2011, extremes 1949–2020)
Month	Jan	Feb	Mar	Apr	May	Jun	Jul	Aug	Sep	Oct	Nov	Dec	Year
Record high °C (°F)	36.2 (97.2)	38.1 (100.6)	38.8 (101.8)	39.9 (103.8)	40.4 (104.7)	38.5 (101.3)	37.0 (98.6)	36.0 (96.8)	37.0 (98.6)	37.1 (98.8)	37.5 (99.5)	36.5 (97.7)	40.4 (104.7)
Mean daily maximum °C (°F)	32.1 (89.8)	32.8 (91.0)	34.3 (93.7)	36.0 (96.8)	35.6 (96.1)	34.3 (93.7)	33.0 (91.4)	32.3 (90.1)	32.5 (90.5)	32.9 (91.2)	32.7 (90.9)	32.0 (89.6)	33.4 (92.1)
Daily mean °C (°F)	26.4 (79.5)	27.0 (80.6)	28.2 (82.8)	29.8 (85.6)	30.0 (86.0)	29.4 (84.9)	28.5 (83.3)	28.2 (82.8)	28.2 (82.8)	28.2 (82.8)	27.7 (81.9)	26.8 (80.2)	28.2 (82.8)
Mean daily minimum °C (°F)	20.6 (69.1)	21.1 (70.0)	22.1 (71.8)	23.5 (74.3)	24.4 (75.9)	24.4 (75.9)	24.1 (75.4)	24.1 (75.4)	23.9 (75.0)	23.4 (74.1)	22.6 (72.7)	21.7 (71.1)	23.0 (73.4)
Record low °C (°F)	15.0 (59.0)	15.0 (59.0)	13.7 (56.7)	15.8 (60.4)	18.8 (65.8)	19.9 (67.8)	18.4 (65.1)	19.0 (66.2)	20.0 (68.0)	18.6 (65.5)	17.0 (62.6)	15.1 (59.2)	13.7 (56.7)
Average rainfall mm (inches)	6.7 (0.26)	24.7 (0.97)	22.4 (0.88)	32.9 (1.30)	208.3 (8.20)	184.3 (7.26)	341.5 (13.44)	386.8 (15.23)	239.6 (9.43)	180.2 (7.09)	91.9 (3.62)	28.0 (1.10)	1,747.3 (68.79)
Average rainy days (≥ 1.0 mm)	2	3	3	3	12	14	18	19	16	10	6	5	111
Average relative humidity (%)	84	83	80	79	82	87	89	89	89	88	86	85	85
Source: PAGASA

=== Barangays ===
Cabanatuan is administratively subdivided into 89 barangays. Each barangay consists of puroks and some have sitios.

Barangay	Population (2015)	Population (2020)
Aduas Centro (Aduas)	5,116	5,116
Aduas Norte	5,546	5,755
Aduas Sur	6,745	7,640
Bagong Sikat	4,599	5,272
Bagong Buhay	852	934
Bakero	3,073	3,359
Bakod Bayan	7,659	9,981
Balite	2,141	2,307
Bangad	7,596	7,688
Bantug Bulalo	2,390	2,009
Bantug Norte	8,695	8,686
Barlis	2,066	2,258
Barrera District (Poblacion)	5,374	5,290
Bernardo District (Poblacion)	1,233	1,144
Bitas	5,779	5,513
Bonifacio District (Poblacion)	2,917	3,041
Buliran	3,322	3,461
Cabu	4,054	5,182
Caudillo	1,614	1,920
Calawagan (Kalawagan)	1,757	1,836
Caalibangbangan	11,112	11,104
Camp Tinio (Campo Tinio)	11,449	11,917
Caridad Village	1,885	1,905
Cinco-Cinco	1,816	2,163
City Supermarket/Bayan (Poblacion)	172	95
Communal	1,451	1,791
Cruz Roja	4,145	5,354
Daan Sarile	7,191	8,030
Dalampang	2,057	2,202
Dicarma (Poblacion)	4,480	4,344
Dimasalang (Poblacion)	1,421	1,281
Dionisio S. Garcia (D.S. Garcia)	7,076	7,405
Fatima (Poblacion)	886	777
General Luna (Poblacion)	1,548	1,516
Hermogenes C. Concepcion Sr. (H. Concepcion)	4,039	4,756
Ibabao-Bana	2,313	2,662
Imelda District	4,001	3,639
Isla (Poblacion)	2,081	2,340
Kalikid Norte	3,344	3,585
Kalikid Sur	5,056	6,210
Kapitan Pepe Subdivision (Poblacion)	4,425	4,795
Lagare	2,366	2,715
Lourdes (Matungal-tungal)	2,457	2,478
M.S. Garcia	4,670	6,148
Mabini Extension	3,314	3,208
Mabini Homesite	4,317	5,501
Macatbong	3,378	3,623
Magsaysay District	4,492	4,242
Magsaysay South	2,800	2,419
Maria Theresa	930	969
Matadero (Poblacion)	1,123	1,010
Mayapyap Norte	2,288	2,750
Mayapyap Sur	5,473	5,904
Melojavilla (Poblacion)	654	387
Nabao (Poblacion)	730	703
Obrero	4,361	4,360
Padre Burgos (Poblacion)	324	328
Padre Crisostomo	4,018	4,298
Pagas	2,997	3,261
Palagay	2,221	2,648
Pamaldan	3,870	4,203
Pangatian	2,815	3,290
Patalac	2,349	2,417
Polilio	2,605	2,913
Pula	1,708	1,306
Quezon District (Poblacion)	1,949	1,648
Rizdelis (Poblacion)	789	784
Samon	1,713	1,806
San Isidro	4,996	6,277
San Josef Norte	4,442	4,684
San Josef Sur	6,793	7,785
San Juan Accfa (San Juan Poblacion)	6,687	8,772
San Roque Norte	1,128	944
San Roque Sur	1,356	1,314
Sanbermicristi (Poblacion)	1,331	1,298
Sangitan	2,015	1,566
Sangitan East	2,050	1,531
Santa Arcadia	4,598	5,751
Santo Niño	1,807	1,946
Sapang	1,382	1,590
Sumacab Este	4,118	4,517
Sumacab Norte	4,698	4,869
Sumacab South	4,487	5,776
Talipapa	1,796	2,498
Valdefuente	4,321	4,216
Valle Cruz	4,856	6,503
Vijandre District (Poblacion)	1,376	1,096
Villa Ofelia Subdivision (Villa Ofelia-Caridad)	1,319	1,315
Zuleta District (Poblacion)	1,558	1,495

== Demographics ==
Population census of Cabanatuan

Year	Pop.	±% p.a.
1903	7,109	—
1918	15,286	+5.24%
1939	46,626	+5.45%
1948	54,668	+1.78%
1960	69,580	+2.03%
1970	99,890	+3.68%

Year	Pop.	±% p.a.
1975	115,258	+2.91%
1980	138,298	+3.71%
1990	173,065	+2.27%
1995	201,033	+2.85%
2000	222,859	+2.23%
2007	259,267	+2.11%

Year	Pop.	±% p.a.
2010	272,676	+1.85%
2015	302,231	+1.98%
2020	327,325	+1.69%
2024	343,672	+1.18%

Source: Philippine Statistics Authority

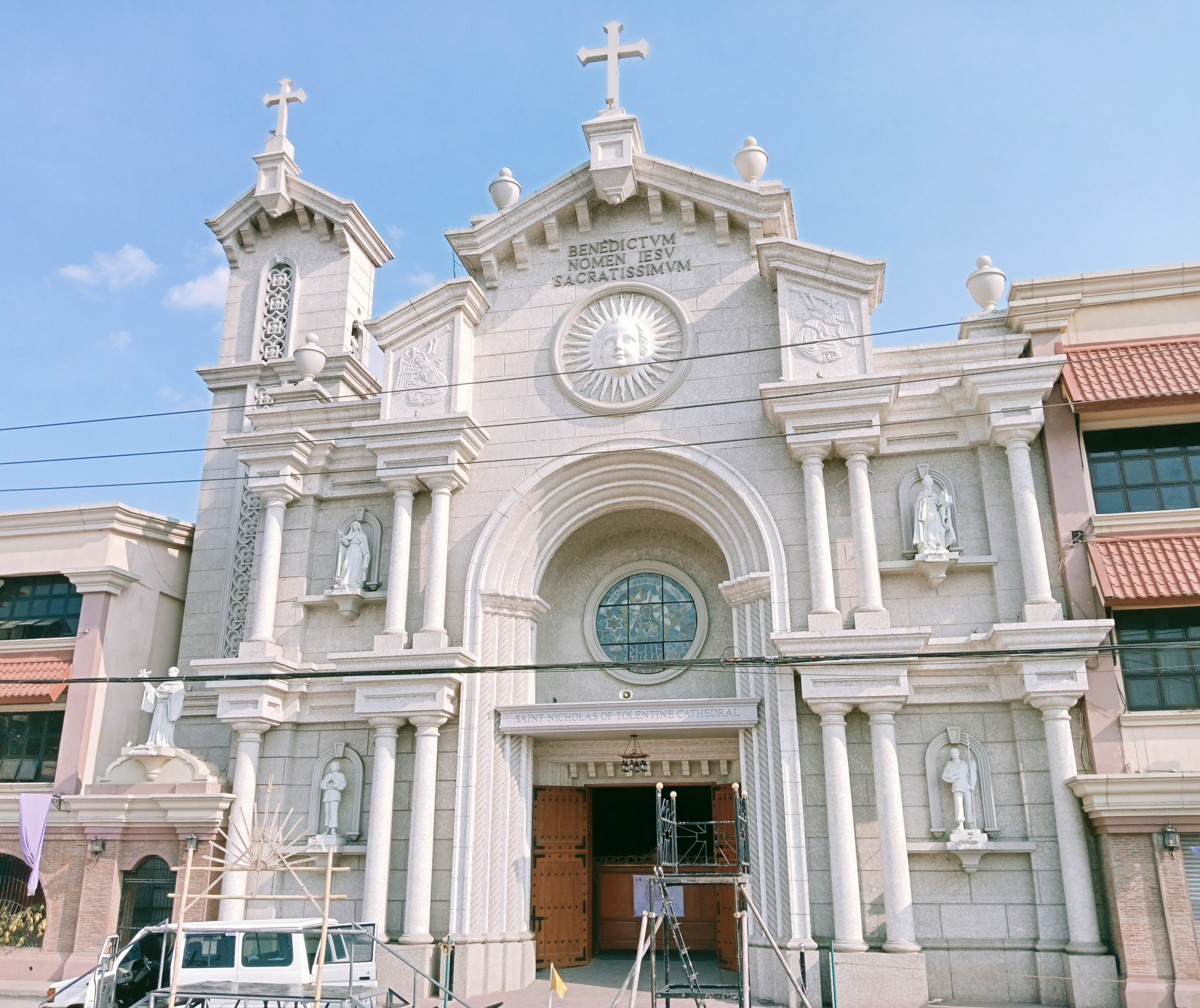
St. Nicholas of Tolentine Cathedral

=== Religion ===
Roman Catholicism has been the predominant religion in the city, being host to a major cathedral – the St. Nicholas of Tolentino Cathedral which serves as the seat of the bishop of the Diocese of Cabanatuan. Other major Catholic structures located within the city includes: Our Mother of Perpetual Help Parish (Dambana ng Ina ng Laging Saklolo), Santuario de Sto. Niño Parish, Our Lady of Mt. Carmel Monastery (the Carmelite Sisters Convent), St. Joseph the Husband of Mary Parish, St. Vincent Ferrer Parish, and the Maria Assumpta Seminary. Local chapels/parishes are also present in most barangays. The Roman Catholic Church owns the College of the Immaculate Conception, the first and only Catholic higher education institute in the city.

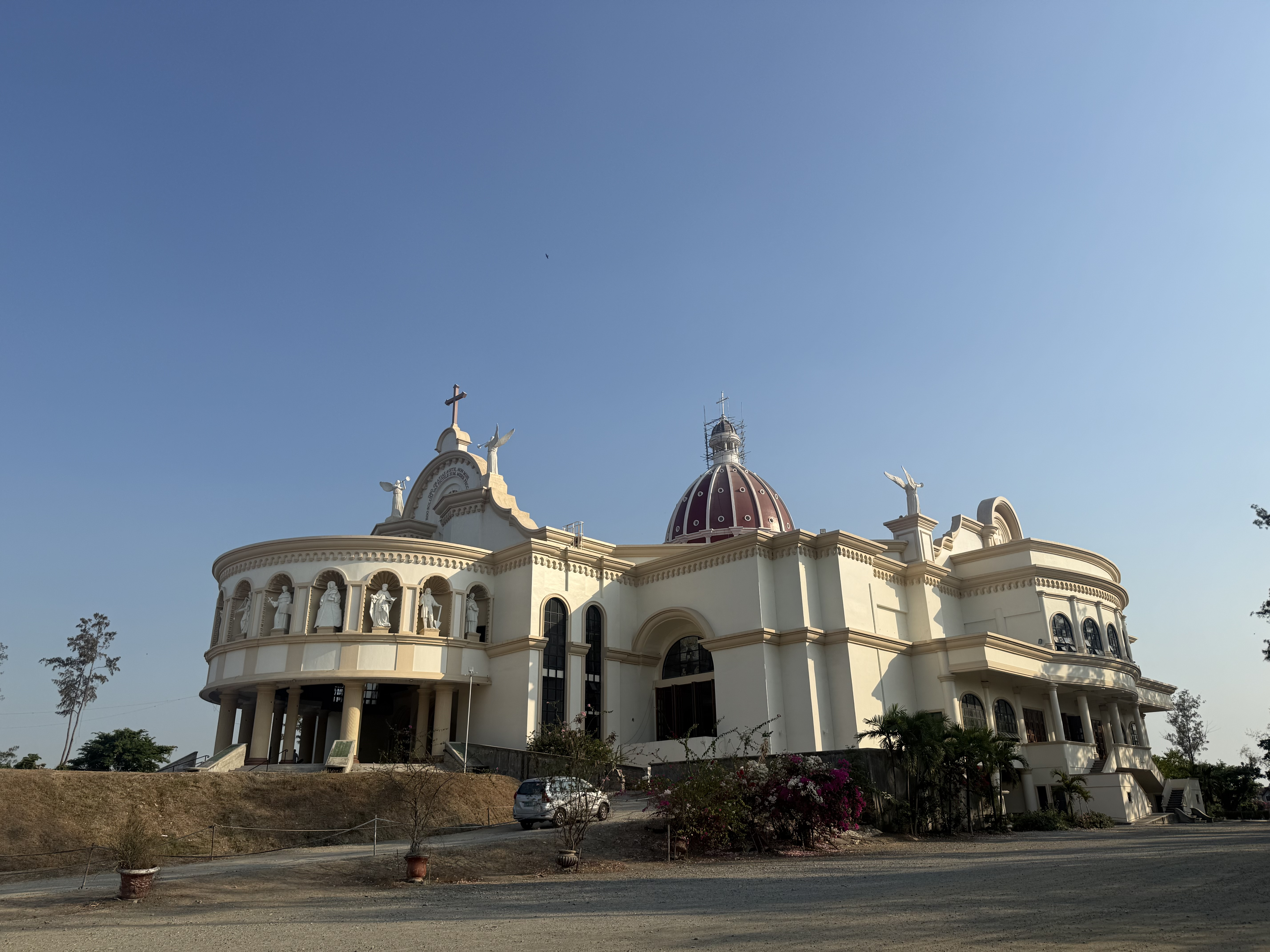
The New St. Nicholas of Tolentine Cathedral in April 2026

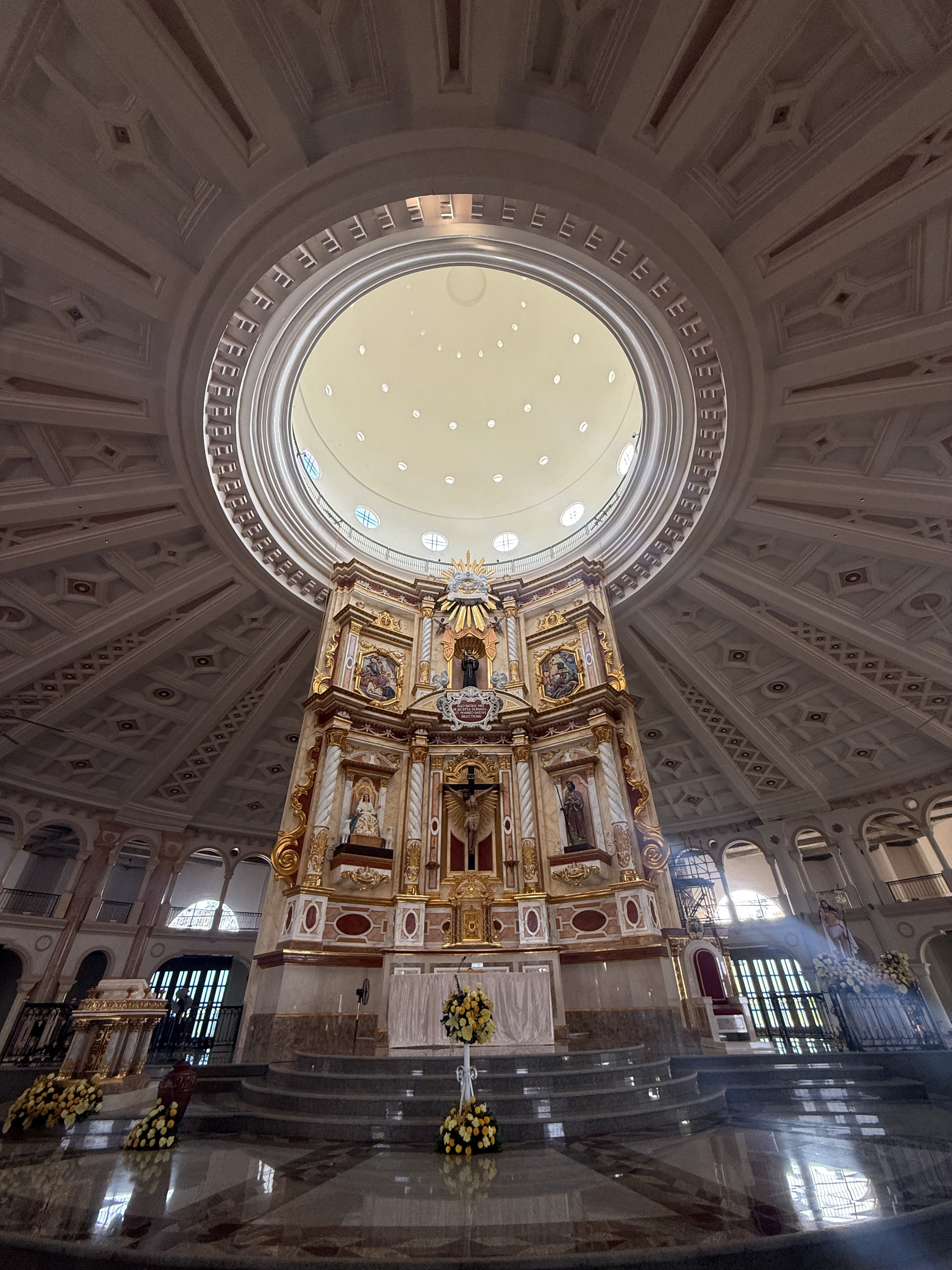
Altar of The New St. Nicholas of Tolentine Cathedral (Crypta)

The New St. Nicholas of Tolentine Cathedral (popularly known as Crypta) has been under construction in Lakewood, Cabanatuan since 1999. The cathedral will be a type of round church, similar to churches that were prominent in Nordic countries during the 11th and early 12th century. It will become the largest church in the Philippines that shall feature a park and accommodate at least 3,000 people once it is finished.

Iglesia ni Cristo also maintains a sizable presence in Cabanatuan with its large house of worship in Barangay Zulueta that seats up to 3,000 people.It has a district office situated in compound.

The United Methodist Church also has many local churches with a large congregation within the city. The United Methodist Church owns Wesleyan University Philippines and the Wesleyan University of the Philippines-Cardiovascular and Medical Center.

Other Philippine-based Christian denominations are also present in the city, such as Jesus Is Lord Church Worldwide, Jesus Miracle Crusade, Members Church of God International, and Victory Christian Fellowship.

The Islamic faith also has a presence in Cabanatuan, specifically within the districts of Imelda and Isla. Three large mosques exist in the city - two in Isla and one in Imelda District.

== Economy ==
Poverty incidence of Cabanatuan (%)

Source: Philippine Statistics Authority

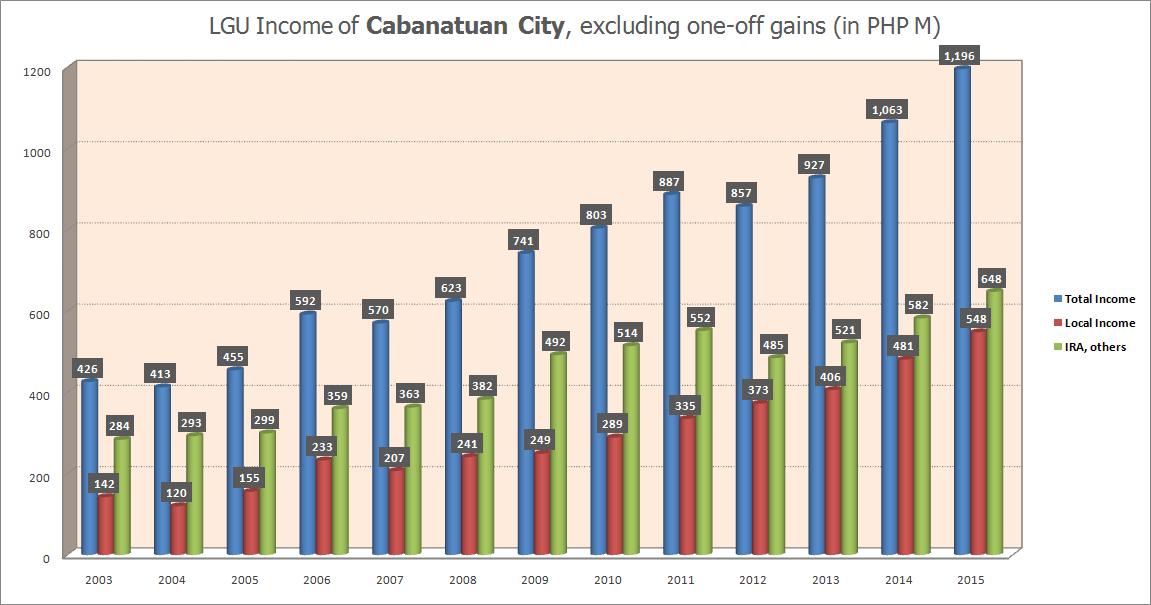
Income of Cabanatuan LGU (2003–2015)

Cabanatuan is the economic heart of Nueva Ecija. More than 640,000 people live in its metropolitan area comprising the city and its adjacent municipalities. As a hub, many people in Nueva Ecija commute to the city during the day. This causes the city's daytime population to swell to about a million.

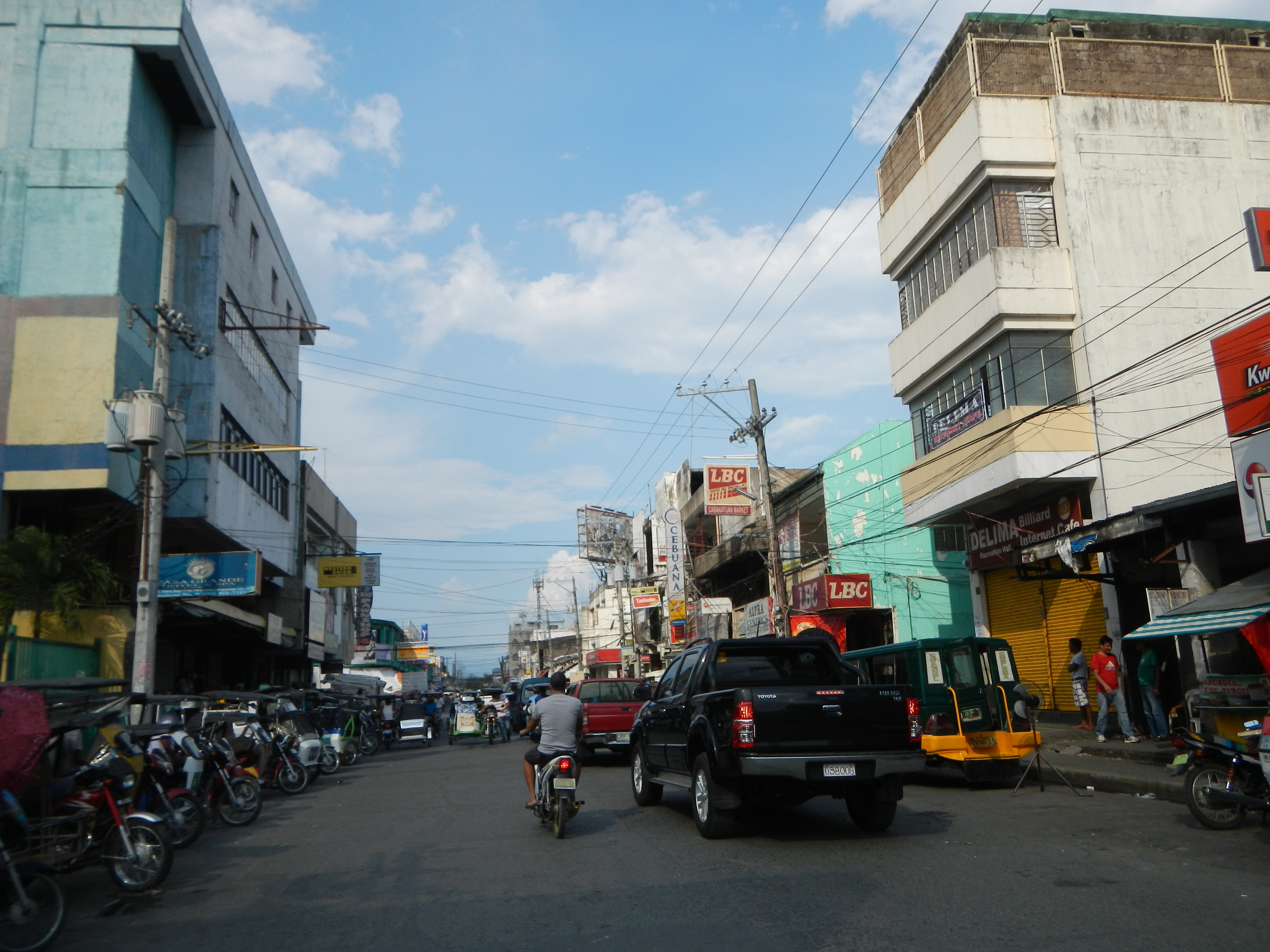
Poblacion area

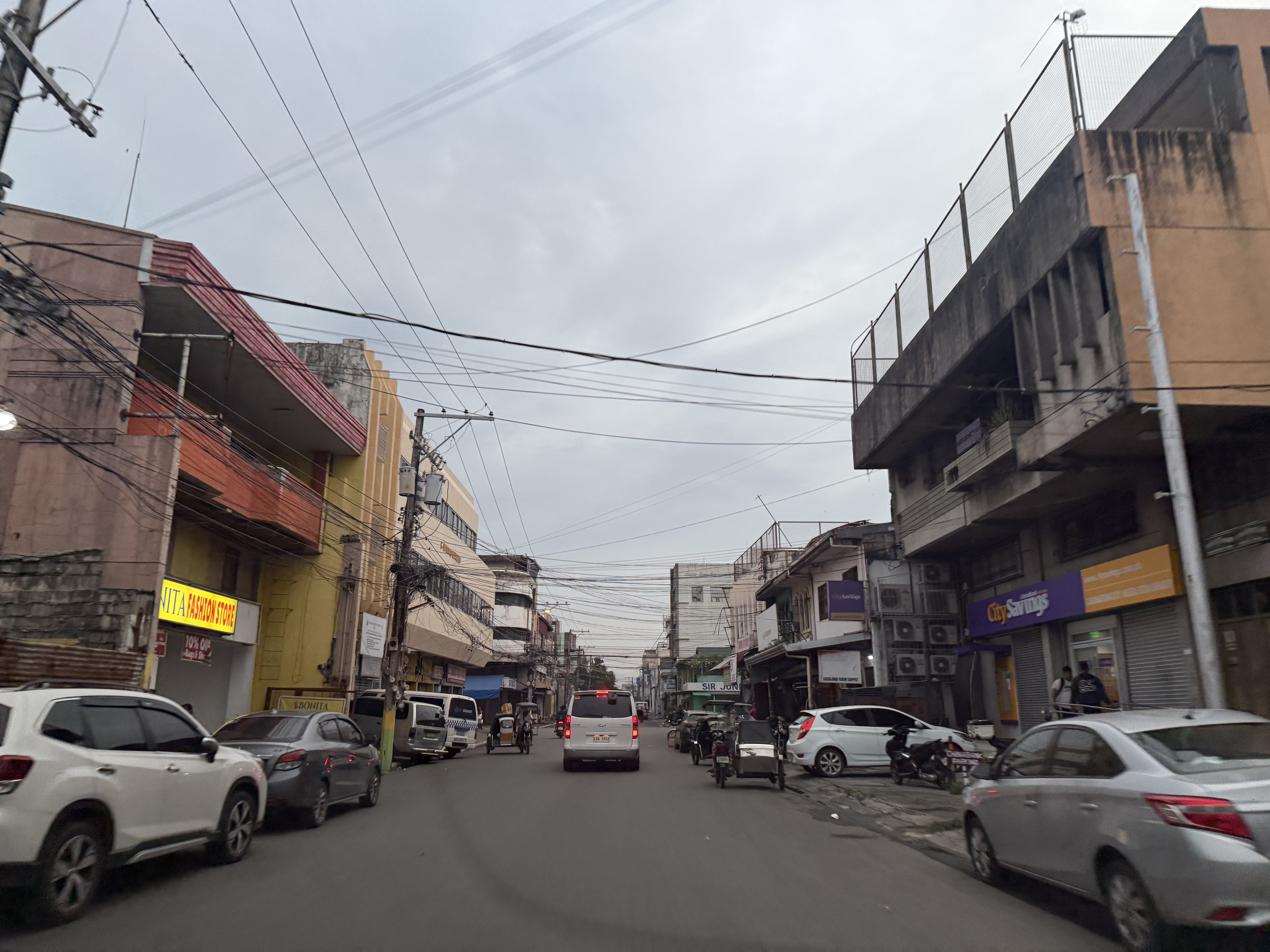
Paco Roman Street

The city is a vital financial center housing a good number of banks, non-bank financial institutions, and headquarters of some of the largest rural banks in Central Luzon. The Bangko Sentral ng Pilipinas (BSP) maintains a branch in the city that performs cash operations and cash administration. As of June 2018, approximately 43 billion pesos in deposit liabilities is kept in the city's 65 banks. This amount constitutes more than half of the province's deposits. In terms of banking convenience, the city ranks as one of the most livable in the country together with Makati.

In October 2024, Cabanatuan City LGU partnered with the Department of Agriculture and the Korea Agricultural Machinery Industry Cooperative (KAMICO) to establish the country's first agri‑machinery manufacturing and assembly complex on a 20‑hectare site, featuring assembly lines, R&D facilities, job creation, and a targeted ten‑year rollout.

=== Utilities ===
Most of the water supply of the city is provided for by the Cabanatuan City Water District (CCWD), founded in 1974 through a resolution enacted by the Honorable City Council of Cabanatuan, pursuant to PD 198. In recent years, the CCWD has entered into a Joint Venture Agreement with PrimeWater, a private water service provider involved in the design of water distribution systems. It continues to provide most of the city's water supply.

Unlike the majority of Nueva Ecija, most of the electric services in the city are provided by the Cabanatuan Electric Corporation. Power generation companies like FCVC and FCRV operate a 12-8 MW diesel power plant and a 10-MW solar power plant, respectively.

=== Telecommunications ===
Major telecommunication companies like Globe Telecom, PLDT-Smart Communications, and Dito Telecommunity have also their respective infrastructures and business offices in the city. Local TV and Radio Stations, such as the city's main local channel CabTV 16 and radio broadcast channel, Big Sound FM 101.5, are also present.

=== Logistics and distribution ===
The city is also a distribution and logistics center for goods and commodities; a number of distribution warehouses and sales offices of various companies serve the whole of Nueva Ecija and parts of neighboring provinces. The National Food Authority warehouses in the city play an important role in regulating Nueva Ecija's rice industry. The city acts as a trading place or bagsakan of agricultural produce from the surrounding farming communities.

Indicators reflect Cabanatuan's economic achievements in the past few years. Annual business registrations in the city grew 31.7% last 2015 while locally sourced taxes grew 14.81% annually in the five years to 2015. Residential buildings and subdivisions, numbering more than a hundred, are taking up lands on the fringes of the downtown.

=== Real estate and investment ===
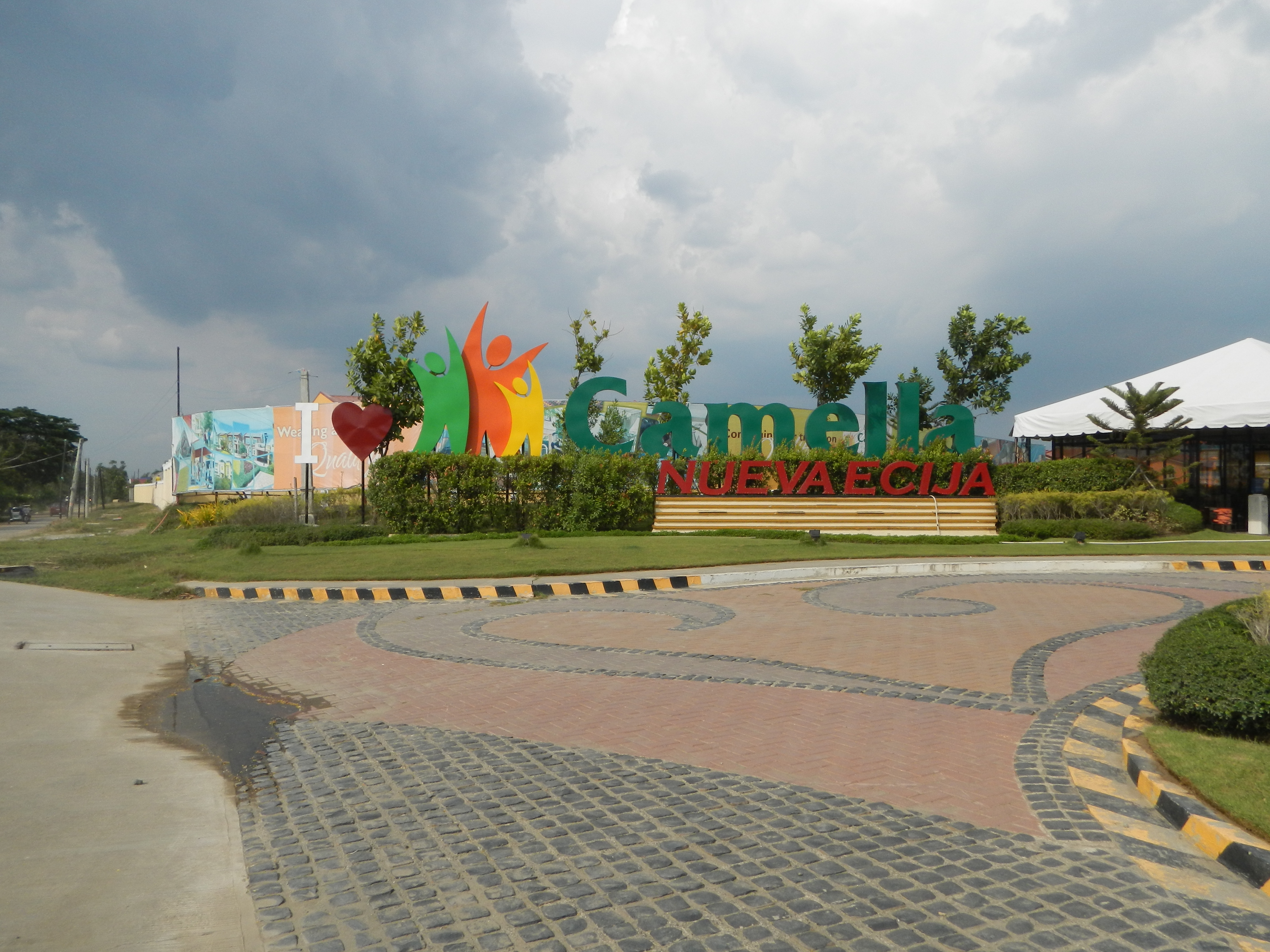
Camella Nueva Ecija

The presence of big land developers such as Santa Lucia Realty, Vista Land, and Ayala Land ensures competition and quality in the new suburban homes. New commercial buildings are springing up in the CBD and along Maharlika Highway at an average of seventy-five per year.

Vista Estates has recently planned to build Verterra Residences, Nueva Ecija's first condominium development and one of the Philippines' first "Urban Green Hubs," near Camella Cabanatuan.

Cabanatuan is gradually becoming a major investment hub and is considered one of the most competitive cities for doing business in the country. Investors in banking, real estate, retail and other business and industrial enterprises are similarly drawn to the city because of its adequate infrastructure and investor support services.

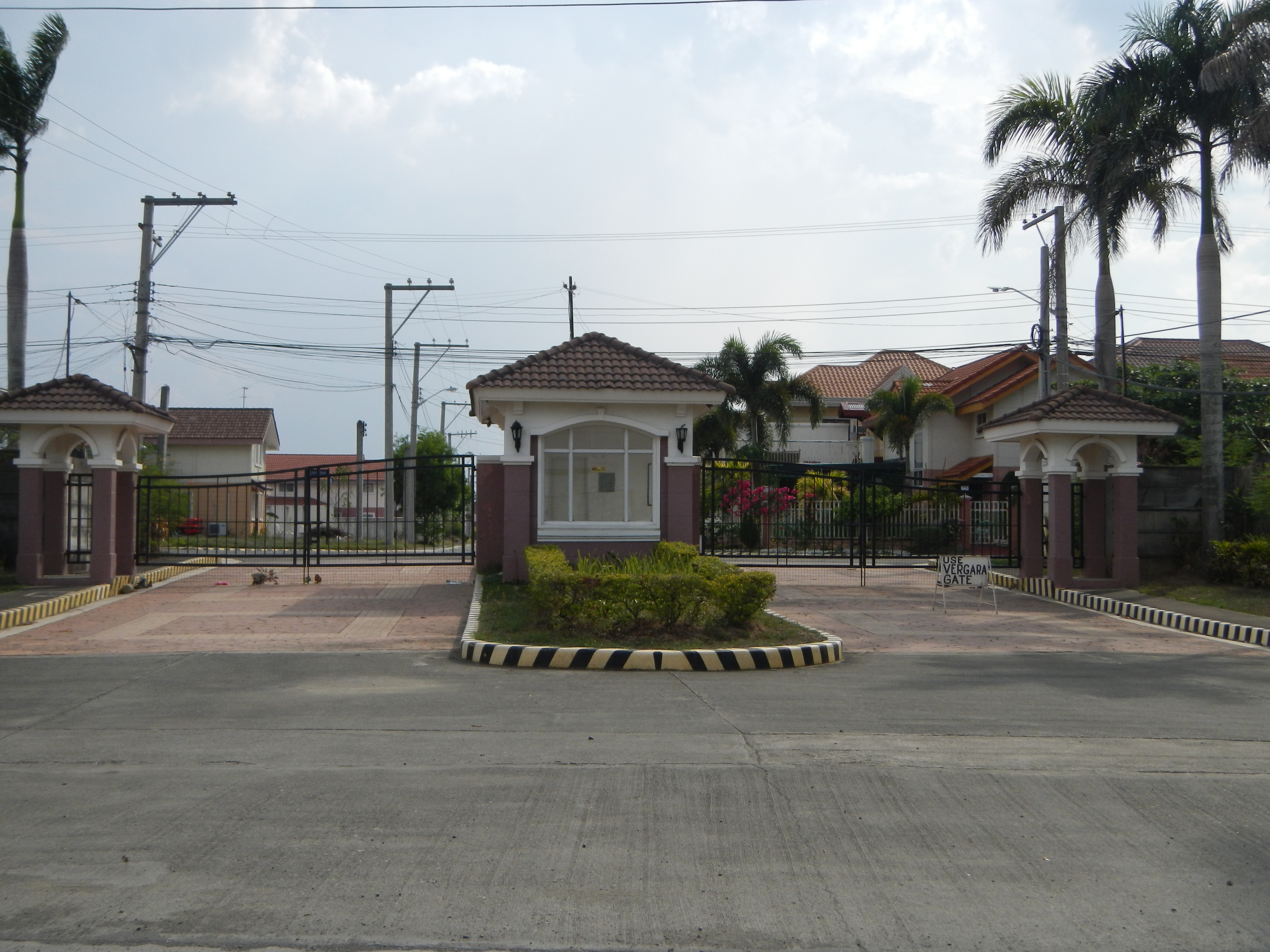
Avida Residences Cabanatuan

Its continuing urbanization is also luring investors into its suburban municipalities as well.

To further explore its economic potentials, Cabanatuan is seeking to have a share of the IT-BPO boom. The first call center in Nueva Ecija was successfully established in the city in 2008. The city government is providing prospective investors with fast business applications processing, low business taxes, and other incentives to attract big-ticket projects.

In 2015, the city's total assets amounted to PHP 3.719 billion and the total income reached PHP 1.696 billion.

=== Shopping centers ===
Cabanatuan serves as the central shopping hub in Nueva Ecija and other nearby localities.

Major Philippine mall chains such as Robinsons Malls, SM Supermalls, Walter Mart, and Puregold Price Club, Inc. have established their presence in the city. Currently, major shopping centers in the city include: NE Pacific Mall; SM Megacenter; Robinsons Townville Cabanatuan; SM City Cabanatuan, which is built as a regional SM Supermall with amenities such as a roof park, an indoor park, and a large-screen cinema; AllHome, and Waltermart.

Cabanatuan has also multiple supermarkets including a chain of Savemore Supermarkets, Puregold Supermarkets, NE Supermarkets, and the warehouse club store, S&R. The city has also numerous hardware centers like Ace Hardware, Citi Hardware, and Wilcon Depot.

==== Future Mall Developments ====
Robinsons Land Corp. has previously expressed plans for their second mall in the city, which will be named Robinsons Place Cabanatuan. However, the plan has since been scrapped due to backlash from groups that were against the decision to build it in the site of Nueva Ecija's Old Provincial Capitol.

Landers Superstore has shown interest in building a branch in Brgy. Sumacab Este.

Cabanatuan is also building a new main public market that is set to open in the near future, after its old public market burnt down in April 2020. Aside from vendor spaces, the new market will house government offices, retail spaces, restrooms, escalators, passenger and freight elevators, and lower ground parking to accommodate the growing population of consumers in the city. The new Magsaysay Market in Brgy. Sangitan is also expected to open in a few years.

Two temporary public markets were built in Melencio Street Ext., Brgy. Kapitan Pepe and Brgy. San Isidro, with the former planned to be converted into a convention center.

No.	Name	Opening Date	Location	Remarks	Image
1	NE Mall (Puregold Zulueta)	late 1980s	Brgy. Zulueta	First mall in Nueva Ecija and one of the earliest in the region.	NE Mall
2	NE Pacific Mall	Apr 1996	Brgy. H. Concepcion Sr., Maharlika Highway	First full-service mall in Nueva Ecija; houses many restaurants, amenities, and also a movie theater that has three cinemas.	NE Pacific Mall
3	SM Megacenter Cabanatuan	31 July 1998 (as Megacenter the Mall); 25 April 2015 (as SM Megacenter)	Brgy. San Roque Norte	First SM supermall in Nueva Ecija. SM Megacenter Cabanatuan was originally opened in 1998 as Megacenter the Mall, one of the earliest shopping malls in Cabanatuan City. The four-story mall was acquired in 2013 from the CHAS Realty and Development Corp before being developed into a SM mall.	SM Megacenter Cabanatuan
4	Melanio's Shopping Center	1990s	Maharlika Highway cor. Gabaldon Street	Once a popular local shopping center in Cabanatuan, it has since ceased operations as a mall and now functions as a commercial building with small clinics, cafes, and office spaces for rent.	Melanio's
5	Robinsons Townville Cabanatuan	4 February 2009	Brgy. H. Concepcion Sr., Maharlika Highway	First Robinsons mall in Nueva Ecija. Originally named "Robinsons Cabanatuan," the mall was rebranded as "Robinsons Townville Cabanatuan", referring to the RRHI's (the mall's operator) own community mall-formatted that it was the sister counterpart of Robinsons Malls.	Robinsons Townville Cabanatuan
6	Puregold Cabanatuan	8 October 2011	Brgy. Bernardo District, Maharlika Highway	First Puregold supermarket in Nueva Ecija.	Puregold Cabanatuan
7	Puregold Circumferential	15 February 2015	Brgy. San Juan Accfa, Maharlika Highway	It is the second Puregold supermarket in the city and currently houses Robinsons Appliances.	Puregold Circumferential
8	SM City Cabanatuan	9 October 2015	Brgy. H. Concepcion Sr., Maharlika Highway	The second largest mall in Central Luzon and third in the whole island of Luzon outside the Greater Manila Area, boasting a total retail area of 154,020 square meters. The five-story mall also includes two Sky Gardens, a Garden Park, a Roof Park, as well as a large-format theater capable for 3D movies and stadium-type seating similar to IMAX housing up to 507 guests.	SM City Cabanatuan
9	Waltermart Cabanatuan	11 December 2015	Brgy. Dicarma, Maharlika Highway	First Waltermart branch in Cabanatuan.	WalterMart Cabanatuan
10	S&R Membership Shopping Cabanatuan	6 June 2018	Brgy. H. Concepcion Sr.	First S&R in Nueva Ecija and 3rd in Central Luzon.	
11	All Home Cabanatuan	27 November 2020	Brgy. Mabini Extension	First All Home branch in Cabanatuan and the entire province of Nueva Ecija. It will soon be converted to a Vista Mall, making it also the first in the province.	
12	Divimart Cabanatuan	30 March 2023	Melencio Street Extension	First Divimart in Nueva Ecija.	
13	Landers Superstore Cabanatuan (upcoming)	TBA	Brgy. H. Concepcion Sr., Maharlika Highway, Cabanatuan City	First Landers Superstore branch in Nueva Ecija; currently under construction and expected to open soon	

=== Hotels, restaurants, and leisure ===
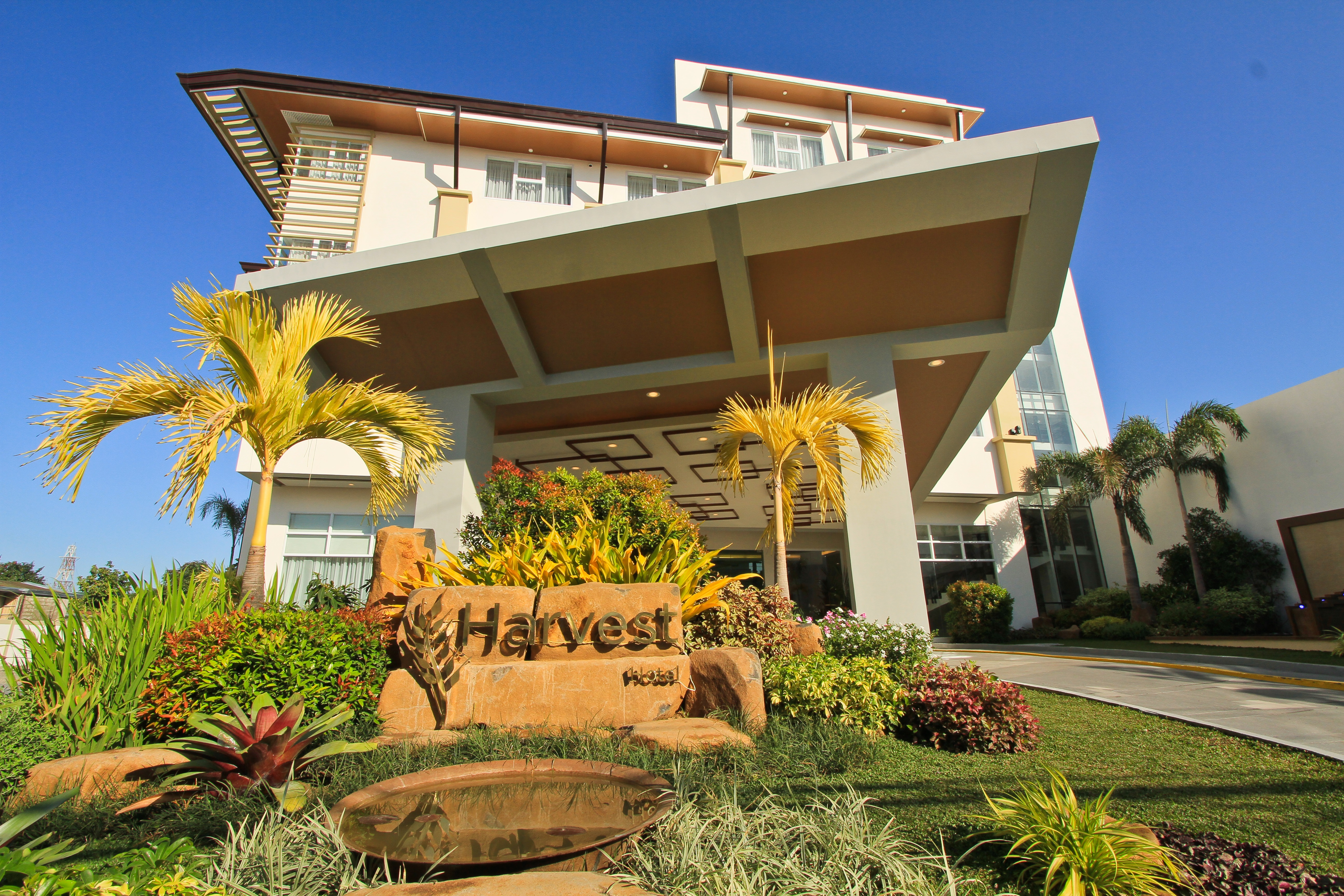
Harvest Hotel

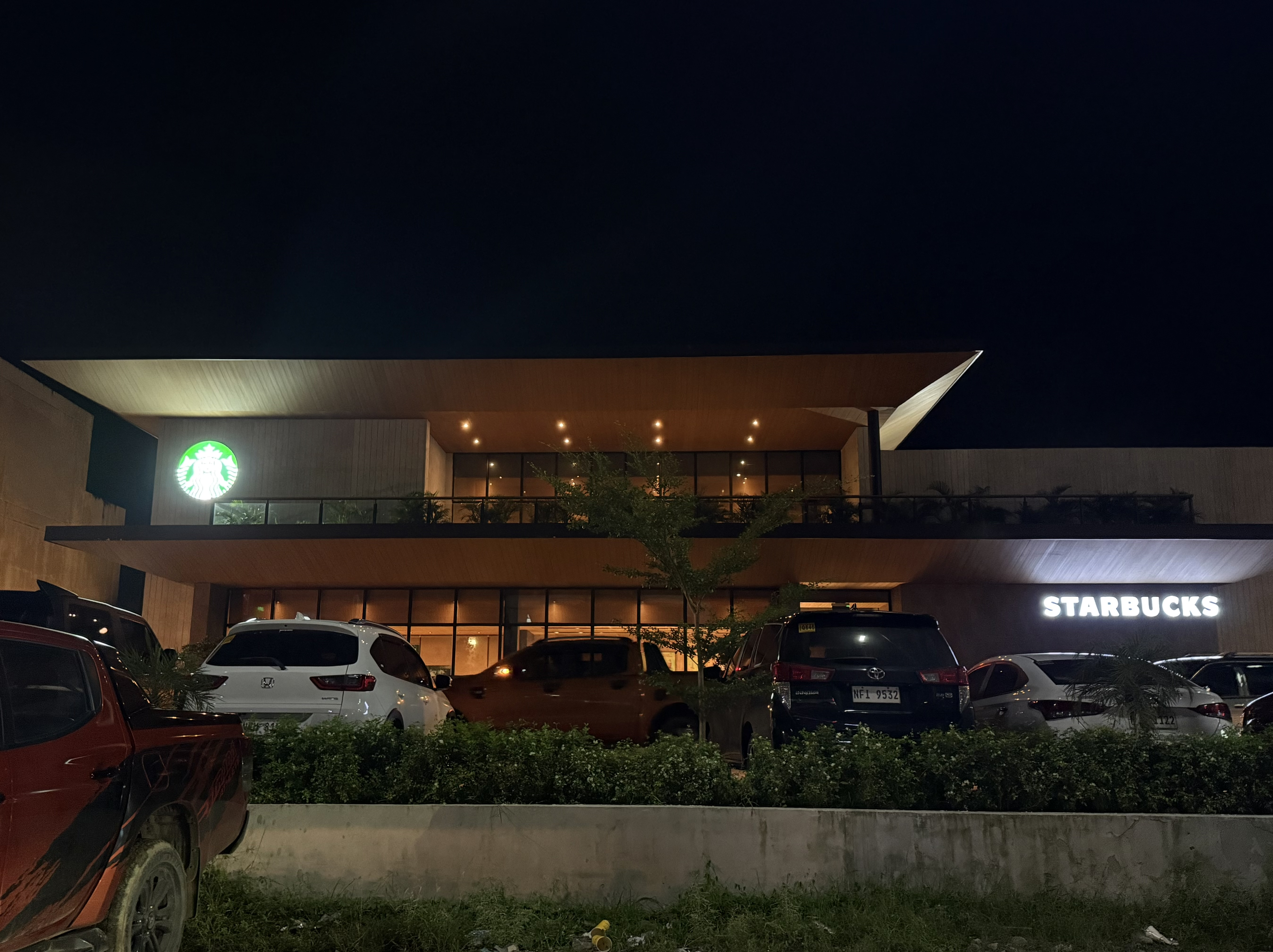
Starbucks Cabanatuan

The city has numerous accommodation and lodging establishments such as hotels, motels, inns, and resorts. Some of the known hotels include Harvest Hotel, Top Star Hotel, and La Parilla Hotel. In recent years, the local food scene in the city has experienced growth. Several local and international restaurants, fast-food chains, bakeries, and coffee shops are also located in the city.

Cabanatuan's food scene offers a variety of culinary choices such as local Filipino delicacies, Japanese cuisine, Korean cuisine, Indian cuisine, and others. Food joints have also been established in Kapitan Pepe Subdivision, such as the Food Park.

The city also features Lakewood Golf and Country Club, a championship 18-hole golf course and leisure destination. The facility includes a clubhouse, driving range, and scenic fairways that host local and regional tournaments.

Various resorts and waterparks also operate in the city, such as BL Resort and Hotel, Acropolis North, and Lamarang Hotel.

The city has recently launched its first fully air-conditioned convention center in Brgy. Bitas in February 2025, serving as one of Cabanatuan's major event-holding venues.

=== Housing and urban development ===
Under the Marcos administration's Pambansang Pabahay para sa Pilipino initiative, the Department of Human Settlements and Urban Development broke ground in mid‑2023 on a major in‑city housing project in Cabanatuan. The project aims to deliver 11,320 housing units in multiple phases on approximately 4.3 hectares of city-owned land along the circumferential road. Plans include constructing 28 to 30-storey residential buildings.

== Transportation ==
=== Public transportation ===
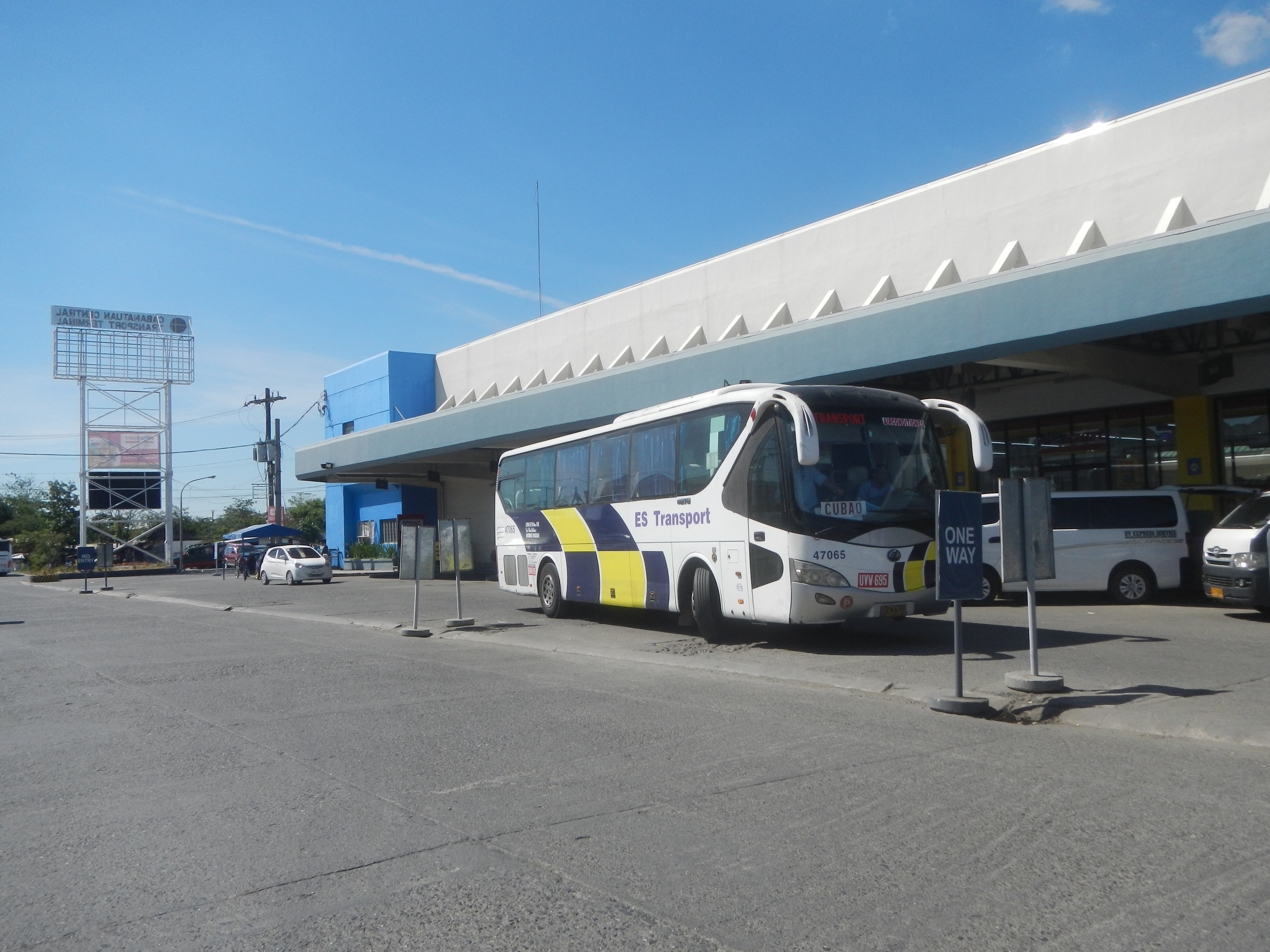
Unloading area at the Cabanatuan City Central Terminal

Cabanatuan is a major hub of land transportation services in Central Luzon. The city has many bus companies operating provincial and regional routes, with the Cabanatuan Central Transport Terminal serving as the terminus.

Much of the city's population rely on public transportation such as tricycles and jeepneys to get around the city. Almost all types of public road transport plying Cabanatuan are privately owned and operated under government franchise.

Jeepney, van, and mini-bus operators serve routes within the province with some reaching as far to Dingalan, Baler, and Dilasag in Aurora, Olongapo City, San Fernando, and Dau in Pampanga, Mariveles and Balanga in Bataan, Baguio in Benguet, Dagupan, and Tarlac City. Tricycle operators serve local routes in the city and sometimes to nearby towns of Santa Rosa and Talavera.

Intercity and interprovincial buses from Manila serve the city, and are usually operated by Baliwag Transit, Inc., Five Star, Victory Liner, Genesis Transport Service Inc., GV Florida Transport, ES Transport Inc., and Pangasinan Solid North.

Grab Philippines is looking to operate GrabTrike, a ride-hailing tricycle system, within Cabanatuan. The company has since established this in other cities in the Philippines such as Dumaguete, Zamboanga, and Angeles City.

=== Road network ===
==== National highway ====
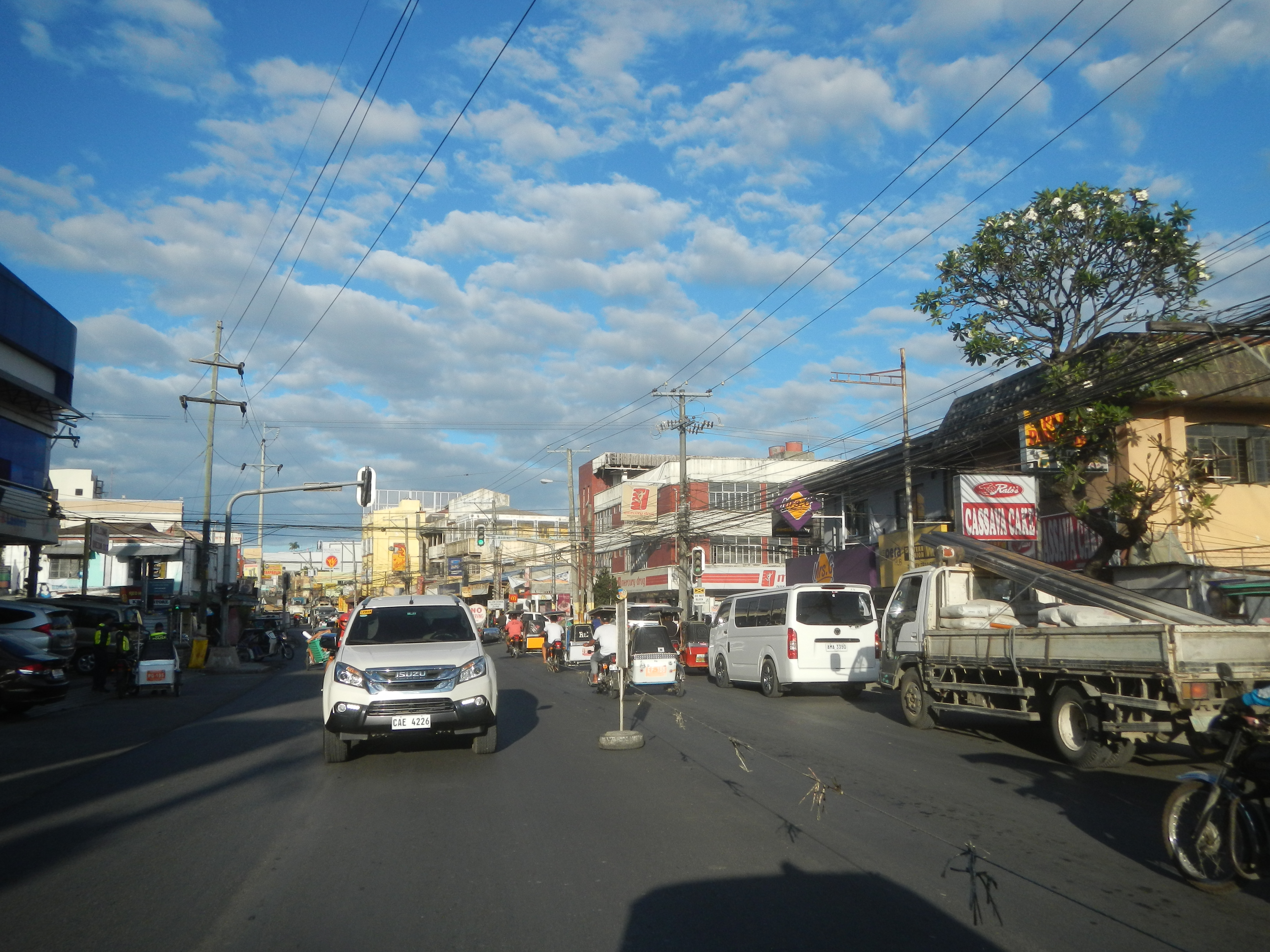
Maharlika Highway - Cagayan Valley Road in Cabanatuan

Maharlika Highway (or Pan-Philippine Highway) is the main highway traversing Cabanatuan where most vehicles going to Cagayan Valley pass through. The city's portion of the Maharlika Highway starts from the city's southernmost barangay, Brgy. Sumacab Este, and ends at Brgy. Caalibangbangan.

Another highway that traverses Cabanatuan is the Nueva Ecija - Aurora Road. The highway links Cabanatuan to Baler, Aurora, passing through rural towns in eastern Nueva Ecija.

==== Arterial Roads ====
Burgos Avenue and Del Pilar Street both serve as the city's main thoroughfare in the downtown area. Other major roads include the General Tinio and Rizal Streets that run through the city proper in an east–west direction; Mabini Street, where two of the city's three universities are situated, and the Circumferential Road that connects the downtown area to the Kapitan Pepe residential district.

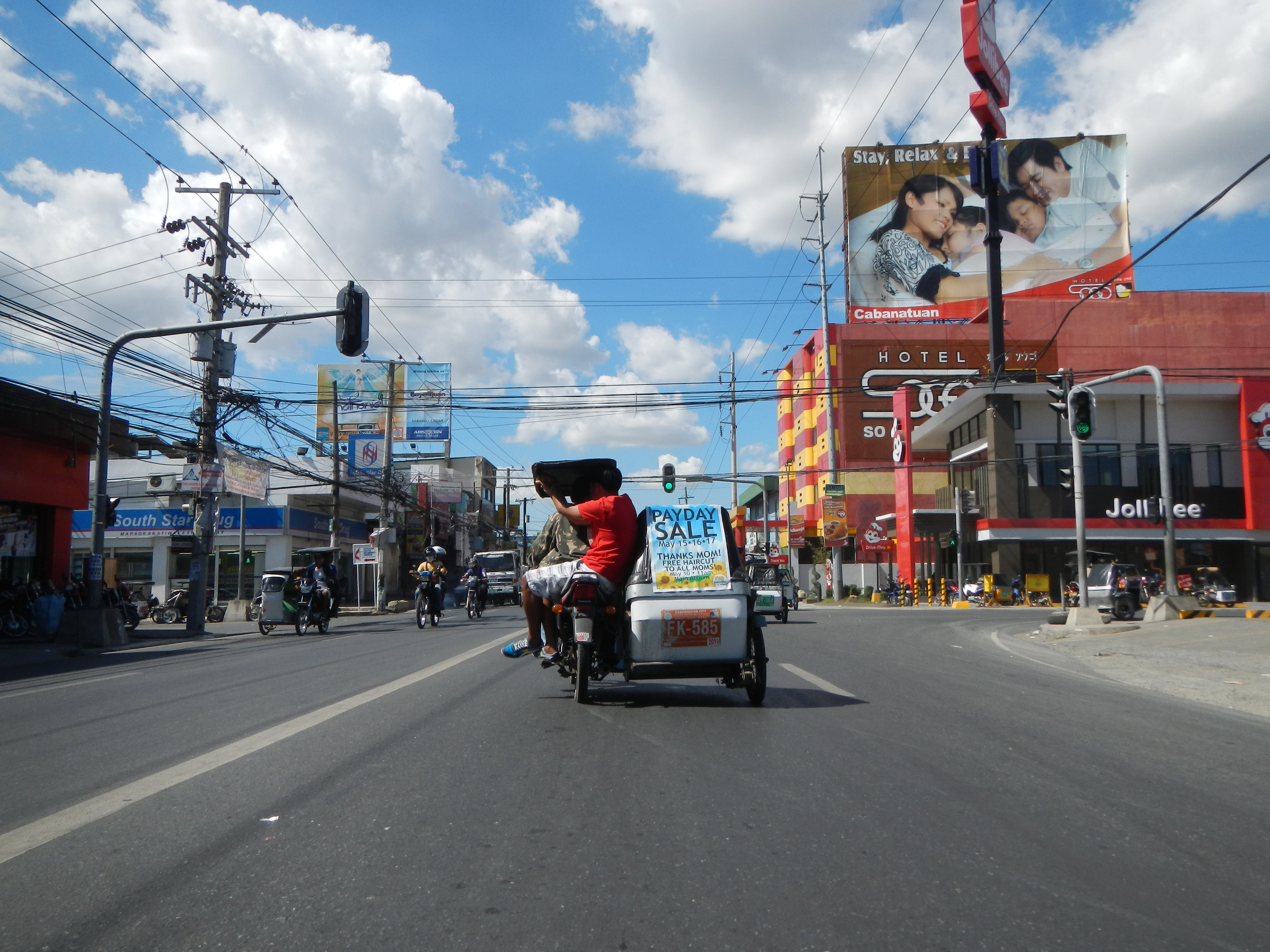
Cabanatuan Circumferential Road - Maharlika Highway Junction

Cabanatuan was previously served by the Manila Railroad Company in 1905 through the Balagtas – Cabanatuan line which was abandoned after the war because scavengers looted pieces of the rail tracks. Rail service was resumed in 1969 after the rehabilitation of the rail tracks as mandated by a government order. The service was again abandoned in the 1980s. The old Cabanatuan Railway Station is located at Barangay General Luna and is converted to a daycare center with the original structure remaining.

==== Expressways and Toll Roads ====
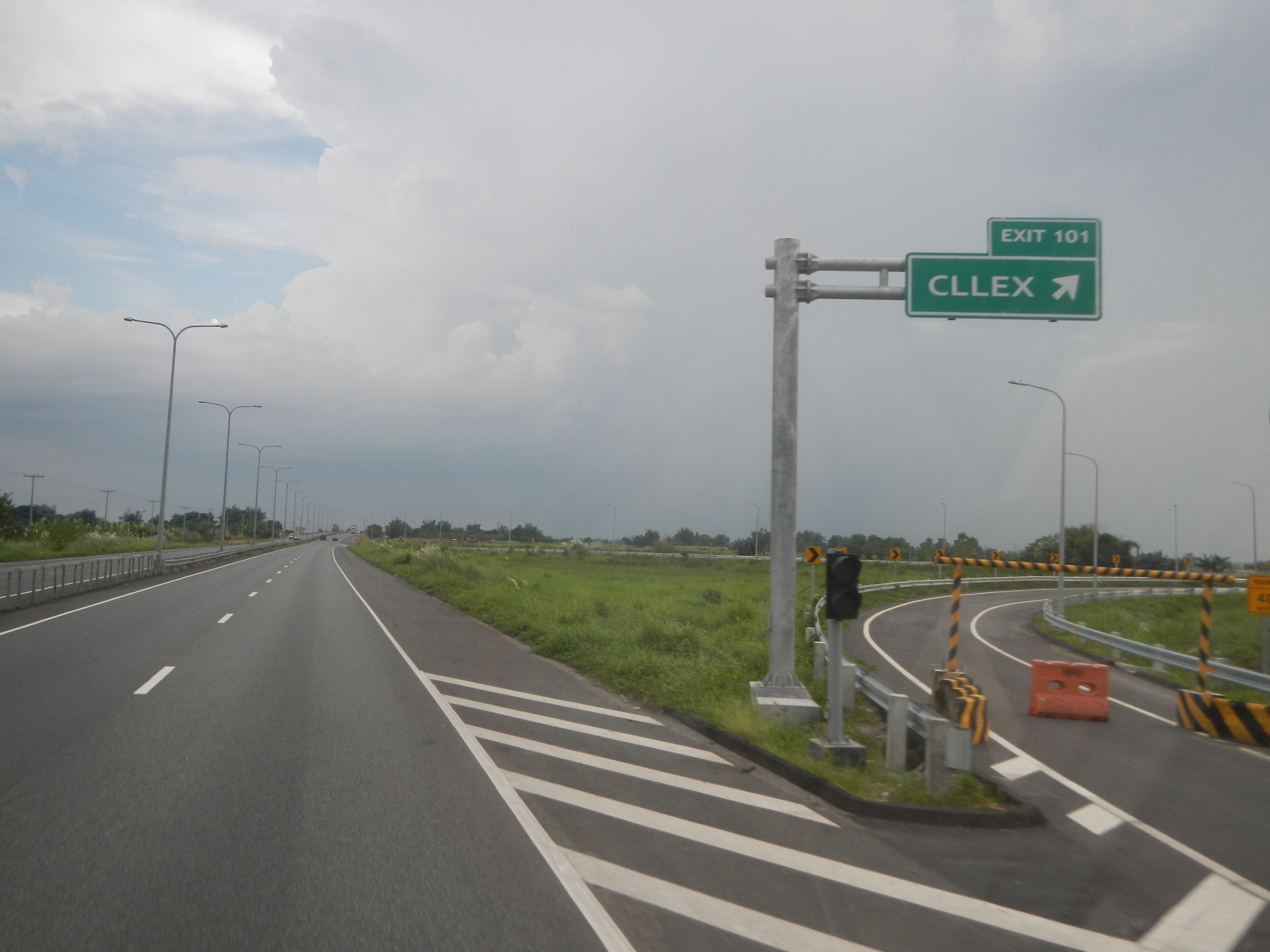
Central Luzon Link Expressway

Cabanatuan is served by the Central Luzon Link Expressway (SCTEX-TPLEX to San Jose City). It will shorten the usual travel time between the neighboring provinces and Cabanatuan, also stimulating the economy of the towns that the carriageway will pass through as a direct consequence. An initial segment from Tarlac City to San Juan, Aliaga was completed in 2024. The temporary exit to Cabanatuan was opened in March 2026.

The city is also the proposed terminus of the North Luzon East Expressway (NLEE), a planned expressway that will further enhance connectivity between Cabanatuan and Metro Manila via eastern Bulacan and Rizal.

==== Cabanatuan Beltway ====
The partially-complete major ring road system aimed at alleviating traffic congestion in the city proper of Cabanatuan. It consists of the following bypass roads:

Felipe Vergara Highway

During the early 2000s to decongest the Pan-Philippine Highway and to spur new developments outside the downtown area, the 10.3-kilometer, four to eight-lane Felipe Vergara Highway was built to provide a more accessible route to the Cagayan Valley by directly connecting Cabanatuan and the town of Talavera.

The Cesar Vergara bridge is undergoing rehabilitation and will expand to three more lanes.

Emilio Vergara Highway

Also in the early 2000s, the 12.35-kilometer Emilio Vergara Highway was constructed to connect Cabanatuan and Santa Rosa to the Nueva Ecija - Aurora Road, avoiding traffic bottleneck along Pan-Philippine Highway. There are also present efforts being made to extend the Emilio Vergara Highway to Talavera as well, later serving as the exit point of Central Luzon Link Expressway in the future.

Cabanatuan-Palayan Bypass Road

This bypass road will connect to Emilio Vergara Highway in Santa Arcadia, with the other end leading directly to Palayan City. The bypass road is expected to be 32 meters wide in the future, similar to the width of said Vergara Highway.

==== Flyovers and Axillary Roads ====
Two flyovers are currently being constructed to ease prevailing traffic congestions in the city. Both flyovers will open by September 2025.

- The 278-meter San Isidro Flyover will serve as the entrance to the extension of Emilio Vergara Highway, which will end at the boundary of Cabanatuan at Talavera, near the partially-completed CLLEX.
- The 330-meter Lakewood Flyover aims to reduce the traffic bottleneck in the Lakewood Avenue - Emilio Vergara Highway intersection.

Cabanatuan is also building major dike roads that shall serve as access roads to far-flung barangays in the city, such as Barangay Samon and Barangay Caudillo.

==== San Miguel-Cabanatuan (Bulacan-Nueva Ecija) Bypass Road ====
A future bypass road that shall connect the provinces of Bulacan and Nueva Ecija, greatly reducing travel time for Manila-bound motorists who traverse the Maharlika Highway. It will end at the junction of Lamarang Road and Emilio Vergara Highway at Cabanatuan City.

==== City Traffic ====
Infrastructure improvements by the administration are ongoing. A Unified Command Center for the city's traffic light system is currently under construction at 25 major intersections. Separate tricycle lanes are also present within the perimeter of the Public Market. Installation of solar-powered lamps along the city's roads are also being done.

Construction and rehabilitation of major bridges are also ongoing, such as the second Cesar Vergara and Valdefuente bridges to ease traffic. The widening of all city and arterial roads from one- to two-lane highway to three-lane highway is also being implemented. For example, road extension and widening of the Emilio Vergara Highway from two to six lanes is nearing its completion. Road asphalting is also being done in the city's major and minor thoroughfares.

== Tourism ==
Plaza Lucero

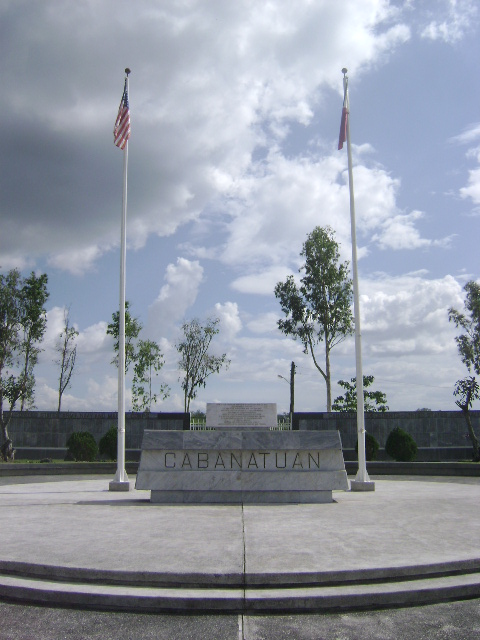
Cabanatuan American Memorial

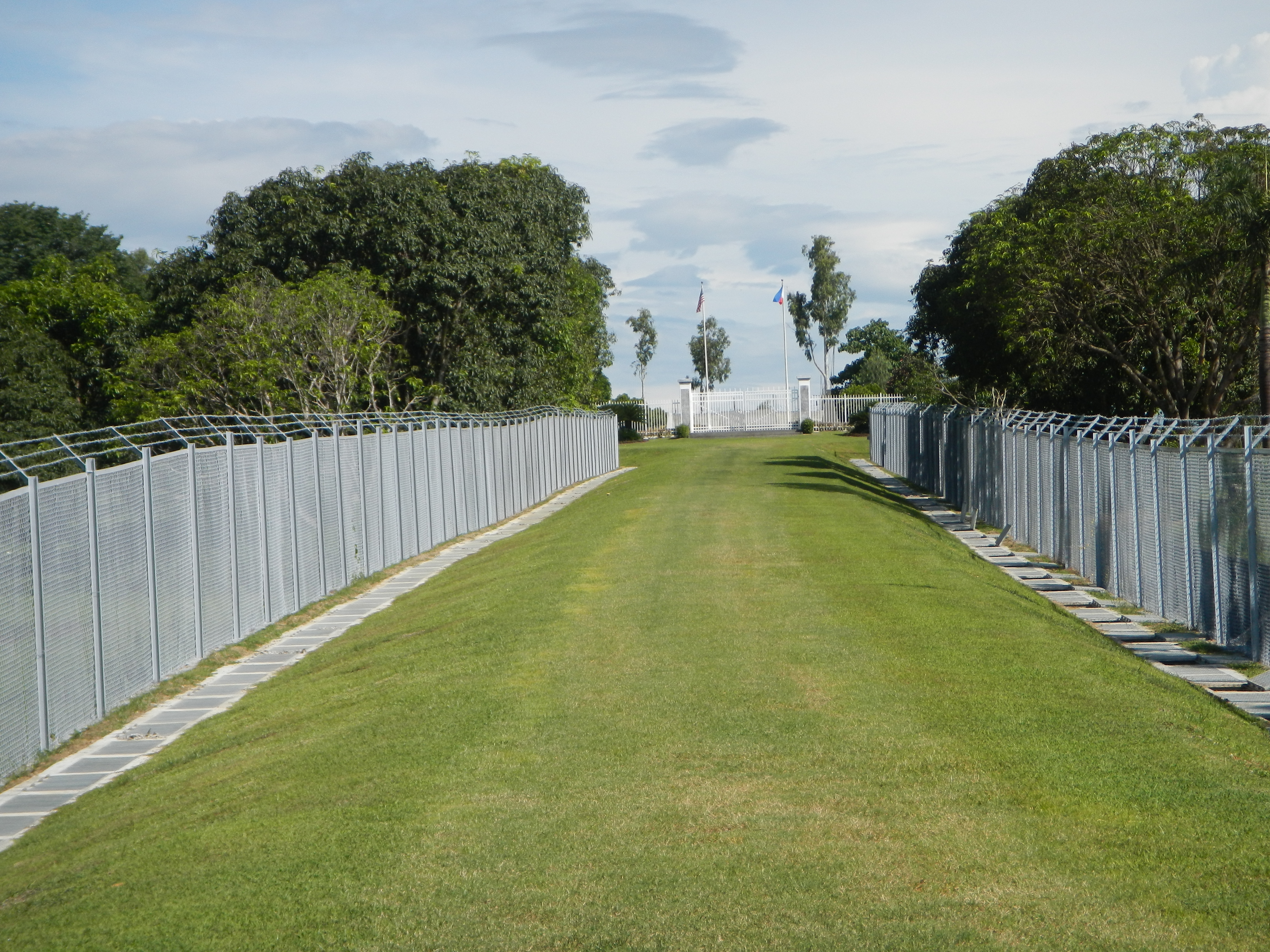
Entry to the Cabanatuan American Memorial

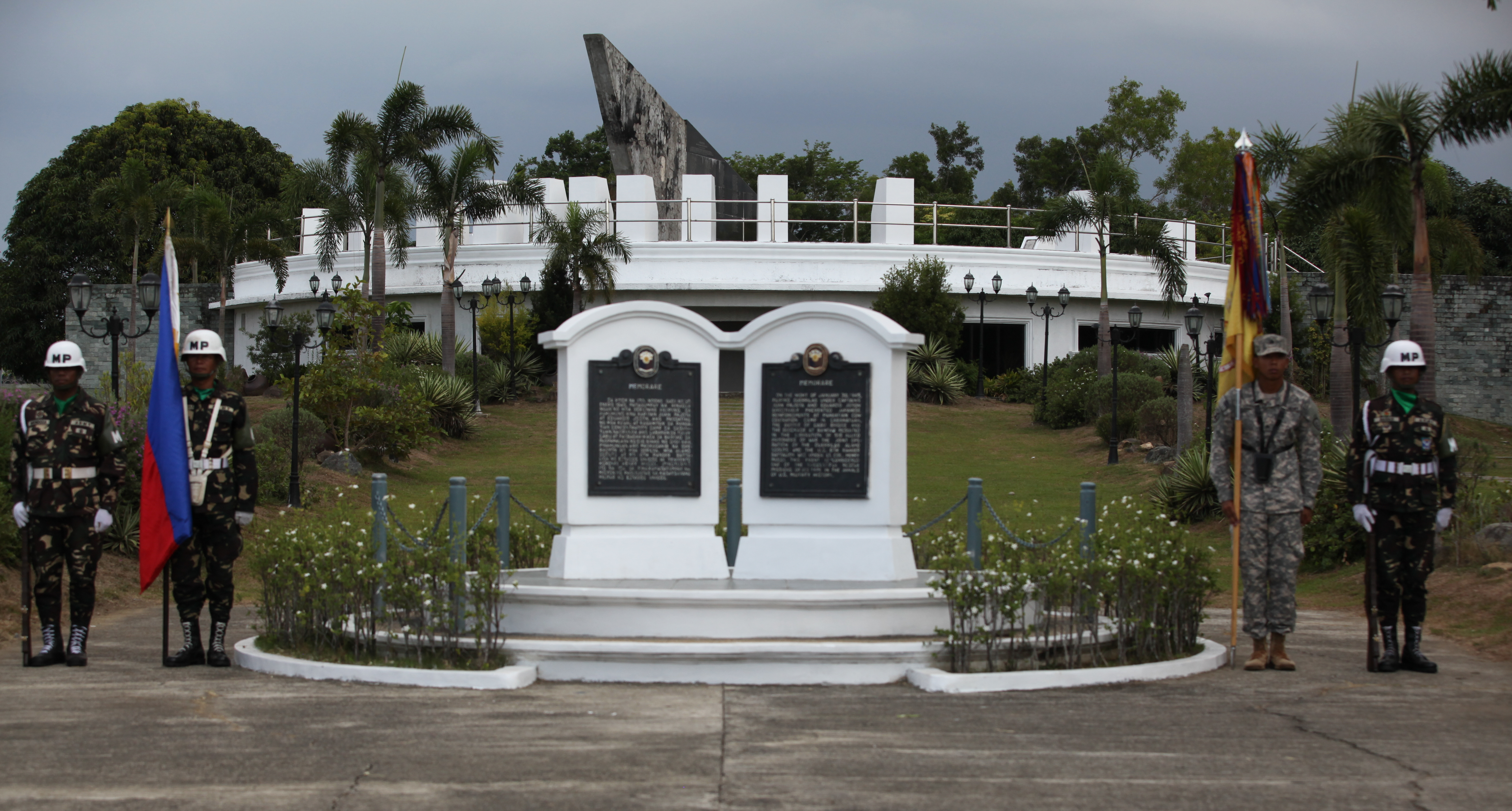
Camp Pangatian Memorial Shrine

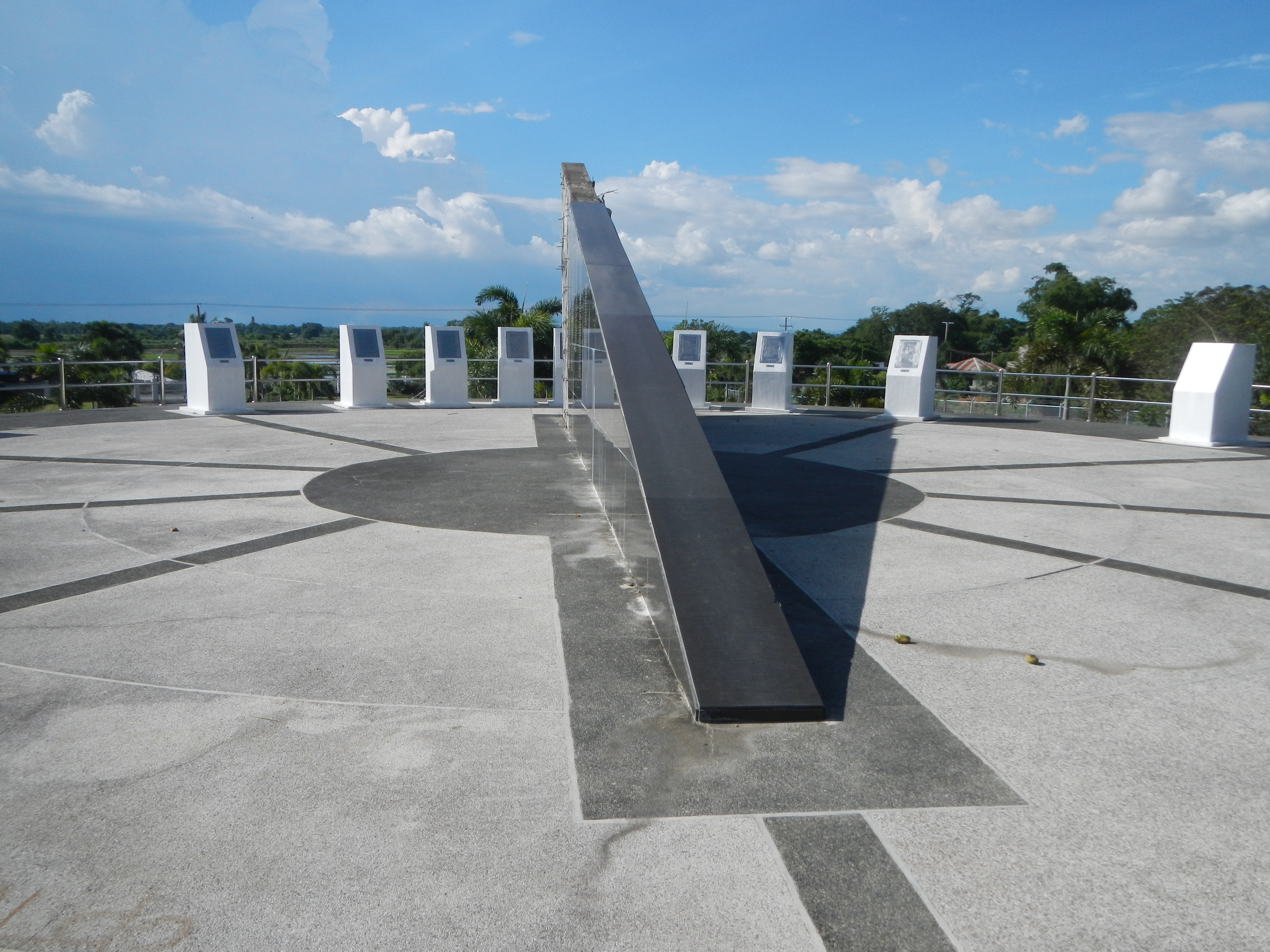
Sundial at the Camp Pangatian Memorial Shrine

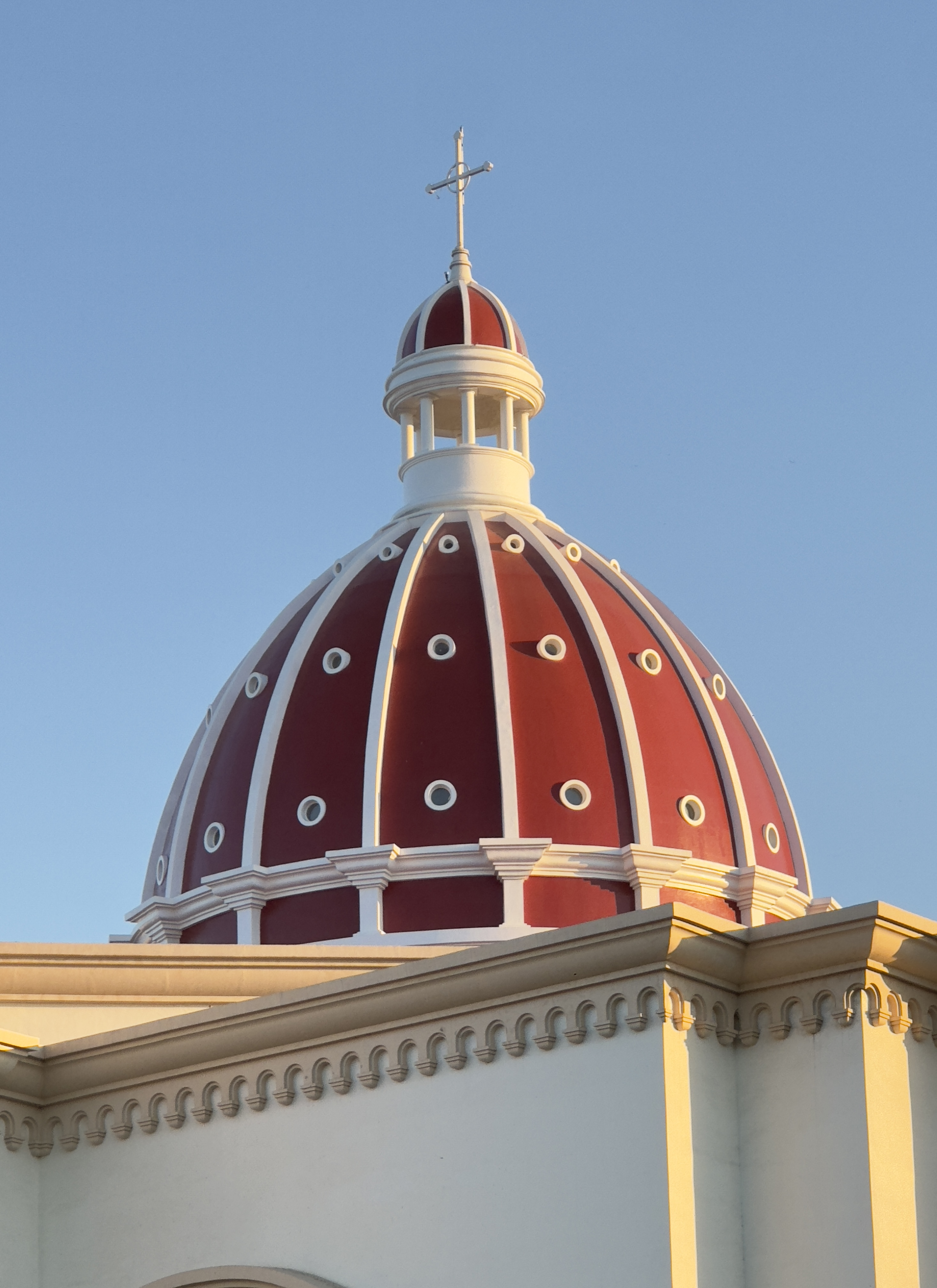
Dome of the New St. Nicholas of Tolentine Cathedral (Crypta)

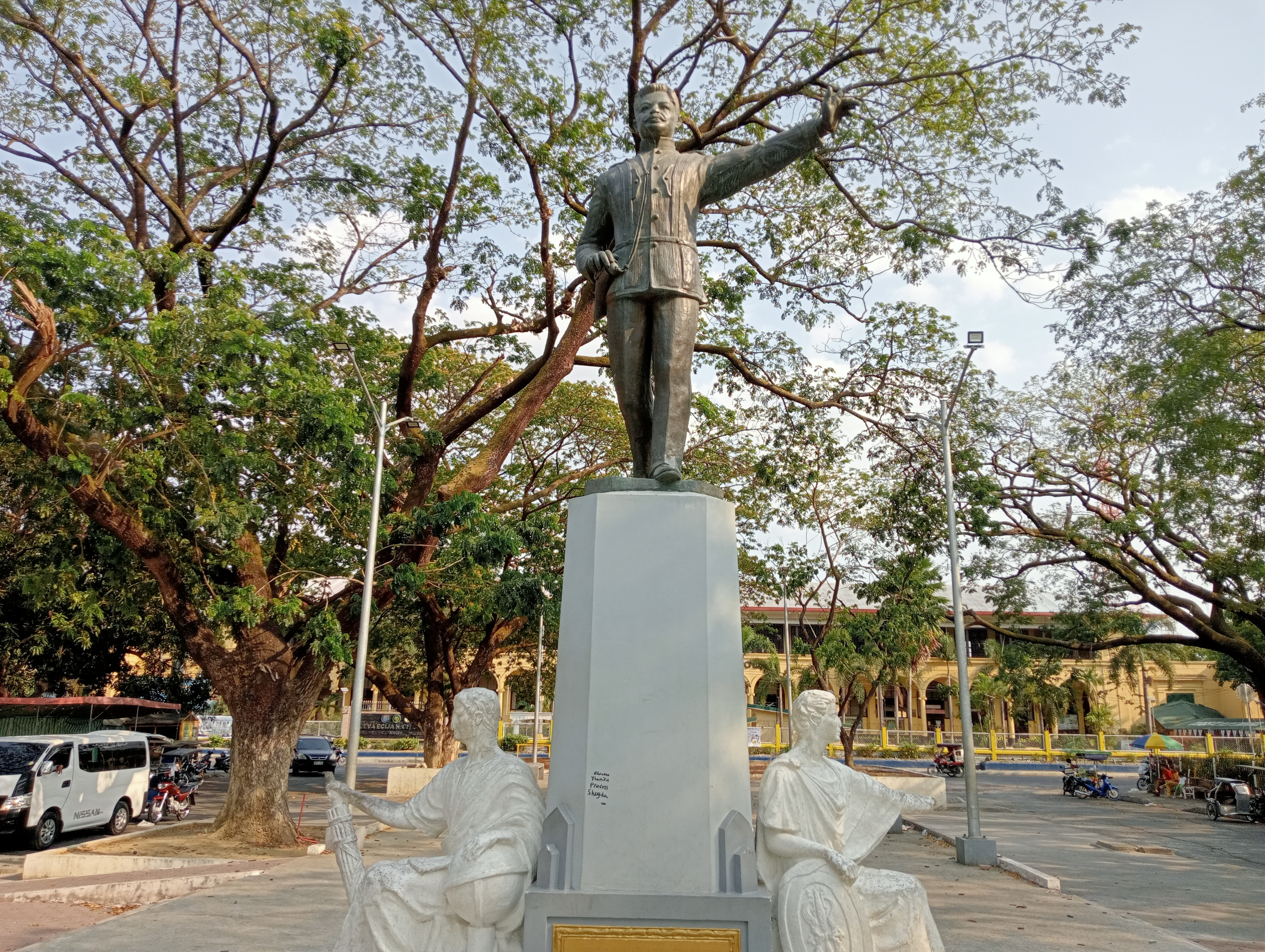
Gen. Antonio Luna Monument, Freedom Park (in front of Nueva Ecija High School)

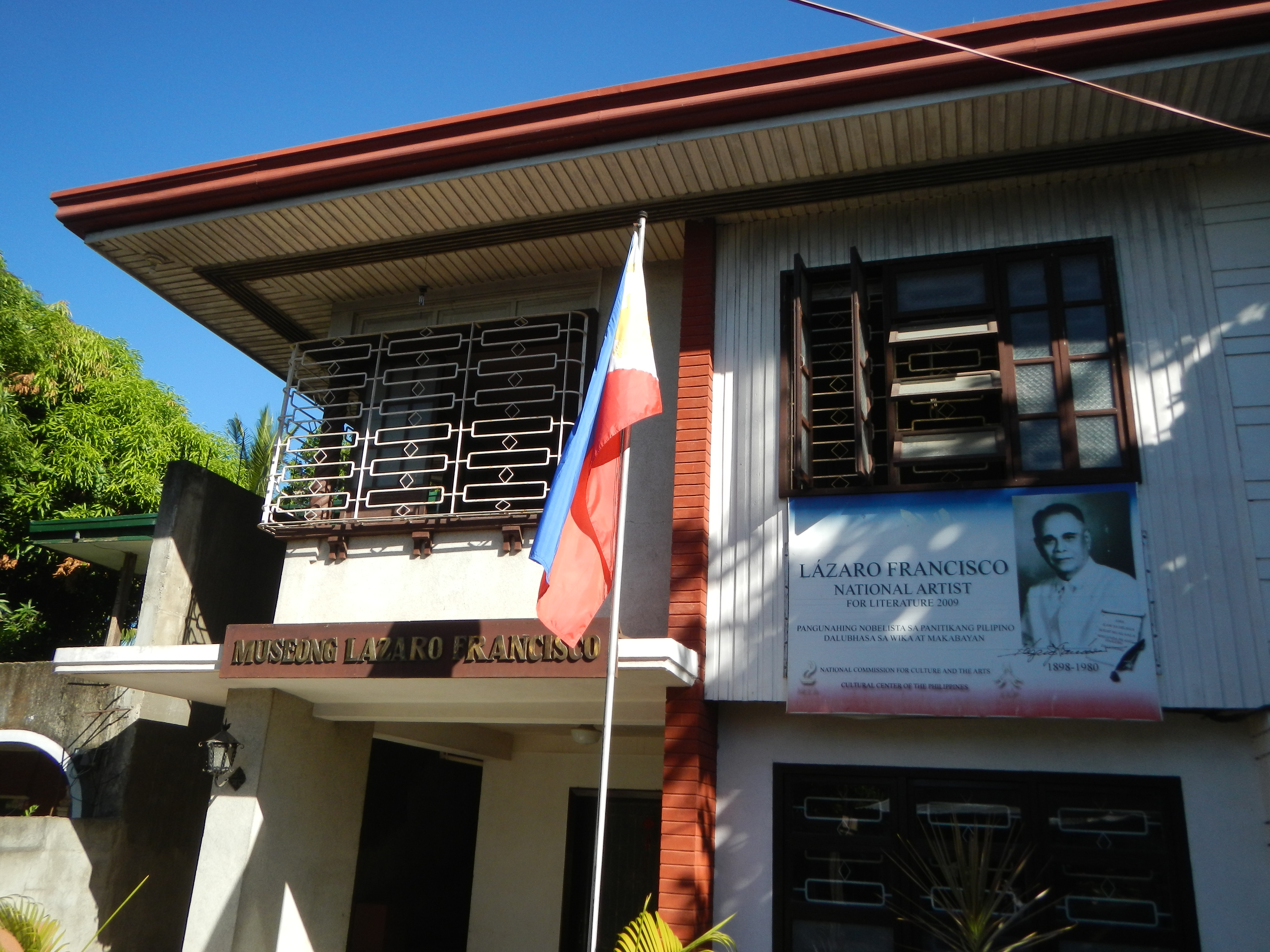
Museong Lazaro Francisco

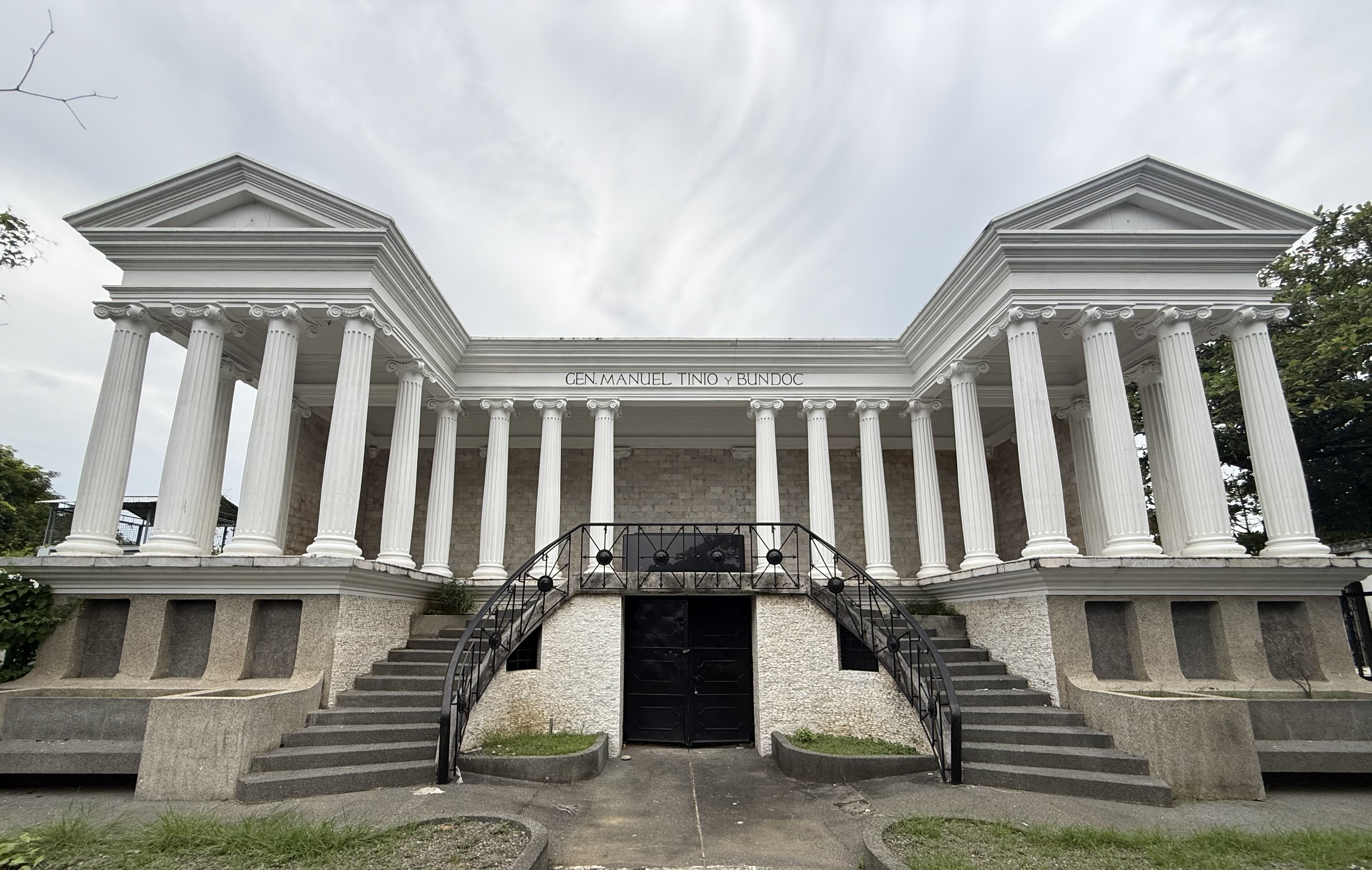
General Tinio Mausoleum and Historical Marker

Historical and cultural sites found in the city include:

- Camp Pangatian Memorial Shrine (also known as the ‘’Cabanatuan American Memorial’’) is a historically significant World War II site in the Philippines. Originally a military training camp, it was later converted by the Japanese into a concentration camp for Allied prisoners of war. In January 1945, it became the site of the daring rescue of American POWs by U.S. forces, with help from Filipino guerrillas. The mission was later immortalized in the film ‘’The Great Raid’’. Today, the site serves as a memorial and a popular destination for visiting war veterans through the WWII Veterans’ Homecoming Program. It features a sundial, a memorial wall, and a historical marker recognizing its significance during World War II.
- Saint Nicholas of Tolentine Parish Cathedral is a historic Roman Catholic church served as the presidential headquarters and de facto capital of the Philippine Revolutionary Government in May 1899, when the First Philippine Republic briefly relocated to Cabanatuan. It was on the steps of its convent where General Antonio Luna was assassinated on June 5, 1899. A historical marker has been installed by the National Historical Commission of the Philippines to commemorate its role in Philippine history. In 2023, PHLPost featured the cathedral and its convent in a commemorative stamp series for National Heritage Month, recognizing their historical significance.
- Gen. Antonio Luna Statue and Death Place Marker is located at Plaza Lucero, directly in front of the Cabanatuan Cathedral. The equestrian statue commemorates Filipino revolutionary general Antonio Luna and stands on the exact spot where he was assassinated on June 5, 1899, on the steps of the cathedral convent. The plaza played a key role in Philippine history as the site of Luna's death during the Philippine–American War. The city later adopted the martyred general as one of its own. In May 2022, the statue was renovated and re-opened to the public alongside the revitalization of Plaza Lucero.
- Old Provincial Capitol of Nueva Ecija was designed by American architect William E. Parsons, renowned for works such as the Manila Hotel and Gabaldon school buildings, and built in 1912. The structure reflects a neoclassical style with park-like grounds, characteristic of government architecture during the American Colonial Period. The old edifice has since been renovated and expanded.
- New St. Nicholas of Tolentine Cathedral (Crypta) is located in Lakewood Avenue. The new St. Nicholas of Tolentine Cathedral, will be one of the largest Roman Catholic churches in the Philippines in terms of floor area and seating capacity. The cathedral features a large central dome, adding to its architectural grandeur. It serves as a major pilgrimage site in Cabanatuan, attracting thousands of devotees during Holy Week. A newly constructed highway flyover adjacent to the cathedral provides a panoramic view of the church, further enhancing its prominence as a religious and architectural landmark.
- Freedom Park is a two-hectare provincial park located in front of the Old Provincial Capitol of Nueva Ecija. Civic spaces as well as various monuments and memorials can be found inside the park which includes a monument dedicated to General Antonio Luna who was assassinated in the nearby Cathedral of San Nicolas de Tolentino.
- Nueva Ecija High School (Wright Institute) traces its roots to the provincial high school established in 1902. Originally located in San Isidro, it was transferred to Cabanatuan in 1921. The main building is a large Gabldon-type structure, a hallmark of early 20th century Philippine public school architecture. A historical marker was unveiled in 2022, recognizing its architectural and historical importance.
- Ling Hong Temple, founded in 1938, is considered the second oldest Buddhist temple in the Philippines. It serves as a place of worship for the local Chinese-Filipino community in Cabanatuan and is among the most prominent temples in Central Luzon.
- Cabanatuan Railroad Station is built in 1927 to replace an earlier 1905 station. Cabanatuan Railroad Station served as the terminus of the Balagtas-Cabanatuan line. Railway operations were interrupted during World War II and resumed only in 1969. With the decline of rail transport, it was later converted into the barangay hall of General Luna, retaining elements of the original structure as a reminder of the city's transportation history.
- Museong Lazaro Francisco is dedicated to National Artist for Literature Lazaro Francisco, a prominent Filipino novelist known for his social realist works in Tagalog. The museum houses manuscripts, personal memorabilia, and exhibits on his legacy. It was inaugurated in Cabanatuan to honor his contributions to Philippine literature and his ties to the city.
- General Manuel Tinio Mausoleum and Marker is the mausoleum of General Manuel Tinio, the youngest general of the Philippine Revolutionary Army. It is located at the Cabanatuan City Cemetery. A historical marker was installed in 1977 by the National Historical Commission of the Philippines (NHCP) to honor his legacy. Tinio served as Governor of Nueva Ecija and later as director of the Bureau of Lands during the American colonial period.
- Casa de Guzmán is a privately owned ancestral residence in Cabanatuan City, known for its stately gate and elegant architecture. Though not open to the public, it stands as a recognizable example of mid-20th century Filipino-Spanish design and is often admired for its well-preserved facade and heritage value.
- Mother of Perpetual Help Parish Church (Dambana ng Ina ng Laging Saklolo) is a Catholic pilgrimage site and parish church in Cabanatuan City. Known for its striking wood-paneled ceiling and octagonal dome featuring a large Marian image, the church has become a visual landmark and a place of quiet devotion
- Bangko Sentral ng Pilipinas – Cabanatuan Branch features a distinctive modernist design and stands on the site of the old Cabanatuan City Hall. Its striking architecture and strategic location along the city's main thoroughfare make it a notable government landmark.
- Acropolis Tower and Water Camp is a Greco-Roman-inspired landmark within Acropolis North Water Camp, a popular resort in Cabanatuan City. The tower serves as a scenic centerpiece for photos and events, while the resort features pools, function halls, and lodging for recreational and formal gatherings.
- Paliparang Maniquiz (P.A.A.C.), 1968 Marker is located within the Camp Tinio National High School compound. Paliparang Maniquiz was once the site of the PAAC Advance School of Flying, relocated there in 1941. Named after Lt. Eliseo Maniquiz of Gapan, Nueva Ecija, it became a training ground for the Philippine Army Air Corps during WWII. A historical marker was installed in 1968.
- Lázaro Francisco Historical Marker is a historical marker honoring National Artist for Literature Lázaro Francisco was installed at Lázaro Francisco Integrated School in Cabanatuan City. The marker commemorates his literary legacy and his contributions to Philippine literature.
- National Food Authority (NFA) Grains Industry Museum is the only museum in the Philippines dedicated to the rice and grains industry. It features exhibits on rice farming, milling technologies, and food security policies. Managed by the National Food Authority, the museum aims to preserve and showcase the country's agricultural heritage.
- Cabanatuan City Hall and Rizal Monument - The City Hall features a unique architectural design. In front of it stands a monument of Dr. José Rizal. The site serves as a civic landmark and venue for official ceremonies and public gatherings.
- First Cabanatuan Renewable Ventures Inc. (FCRVI) Solar Farm is a pioneering solar energy facility in Nueva Ecija. It consists of vast arrays of solar panels spanning several hectares and generating clean energy for the region. As one of the largest city-based solar projects in Central Luzon, it also holds potential as a renewable energy tourism site, showcasing the city's commitment to sustainable development.
- Lakewood Golf & Country Club is a recognized golf course by the National Golf Association of the Philippines.
- Cabanatuan Eco Park is a future city project that will convert the Valle Cruz dumpsite into a ten-hectare eco park. Government centers, including the new Cabanatuan City Hall, are to be built within the area.

Festivals and celebrations celebrated in Cabanatuan include:

- Banatu Festival celebrates the city's founding anniversary as a chartered city. From its humble beginning in 2015, "Banatu Festival" aims to showcase the history, culture, talent, beauty and craftsmanship of Cabanatueños.
- Longganisa Festival is one of the activities in "Banatu Festival" and is held in the vicinity of the public market along Paco Roman Street. Apart from the local meat traders and customers, tourists from nearby towns also join the celebration. Highlights of this festival are the cooking contests and the different preparations for longganisa (native sausage like "batutay", "longganisang bawang" and "longganisang matamis"), including spaghetti and "binagoongan".

== Government ==
=== Local government ===
Cabanatuan's current seat of government, the city hall, is located at Barangay San Josef Sur. The local government structure is composed of one mayor, one vice mayor, and ten councilors. Each official is elected publicly to a 3-year term and can be re-elected up to 3 terms in succession. The day-to-day administration of the city is handled by the city administrator. Soon, the city hall and its civic centers will be relocated in a new site.

=== Elected officials ===
Members of the Cabanatuan City Council (2025–2028)
Position	Name
District Representative (3rd Legislative District of the province of Nueva Ecija)	Julius Cesar V. Vergara
Chief Executive of the City of Cabanatuan	Mayor Myca Elizabeth R. Vergara
Presiding Officer of the City Council of Cabanatuan	Vice Mayor Joselito C. Roque
Members of the City Council	Jo-Mario Angelo E. Matias
Members of the City Council	Jean Yasmin D. Cruz
Members of the City Council	Marius A. Garcia
Members of the City Council	Aldwin Joseph V. Diaz
Members of the City Council	Oscar M. Mendoza
Members of the City Council	Jojo V. Balino
Members of the City Council	Epifanio G. Posada
Members of the City Council	Medel R. Seeping
Members of the City Council	Christian Jan G. Cecilio
Members of the City Council	Emmanuel D. Liwag II

== Education ==
Cabanatuan is a regional educational hub. The city has more than forty higher education institutions including four universities, a science high school, more than fifty public and private high schools, and more than a hundred public and private primary schools.

Some prominent schools, universities and colleges within the city include Araullo University, College of the Immaculate Conception, the Sumacab Main and General Tinio campuses of the Nueva Ecija University of Science and Technology, the Nueva Ecija campus of Our Lady of Fatima University, and Wesleyan University Philippines.

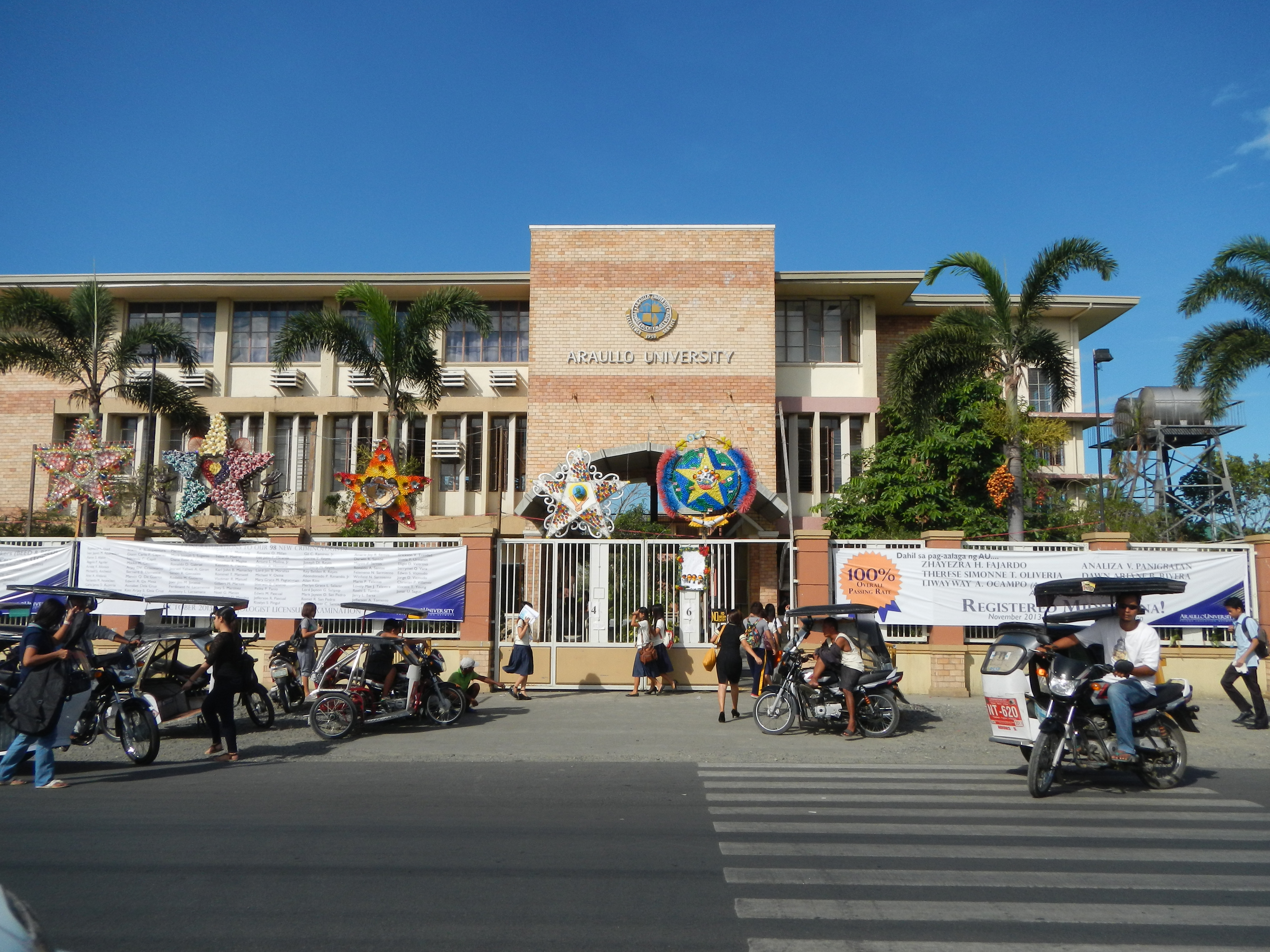
Araullo University

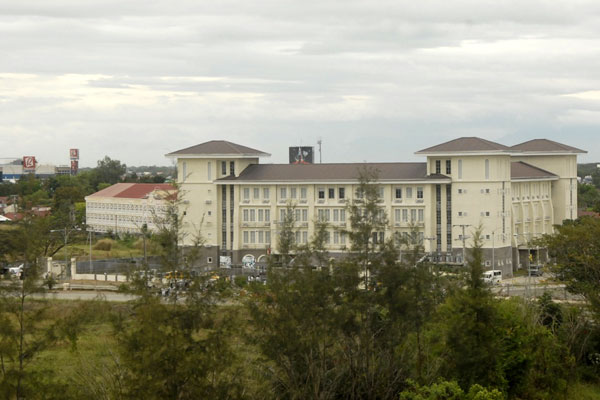
College of the Immaculate Conception

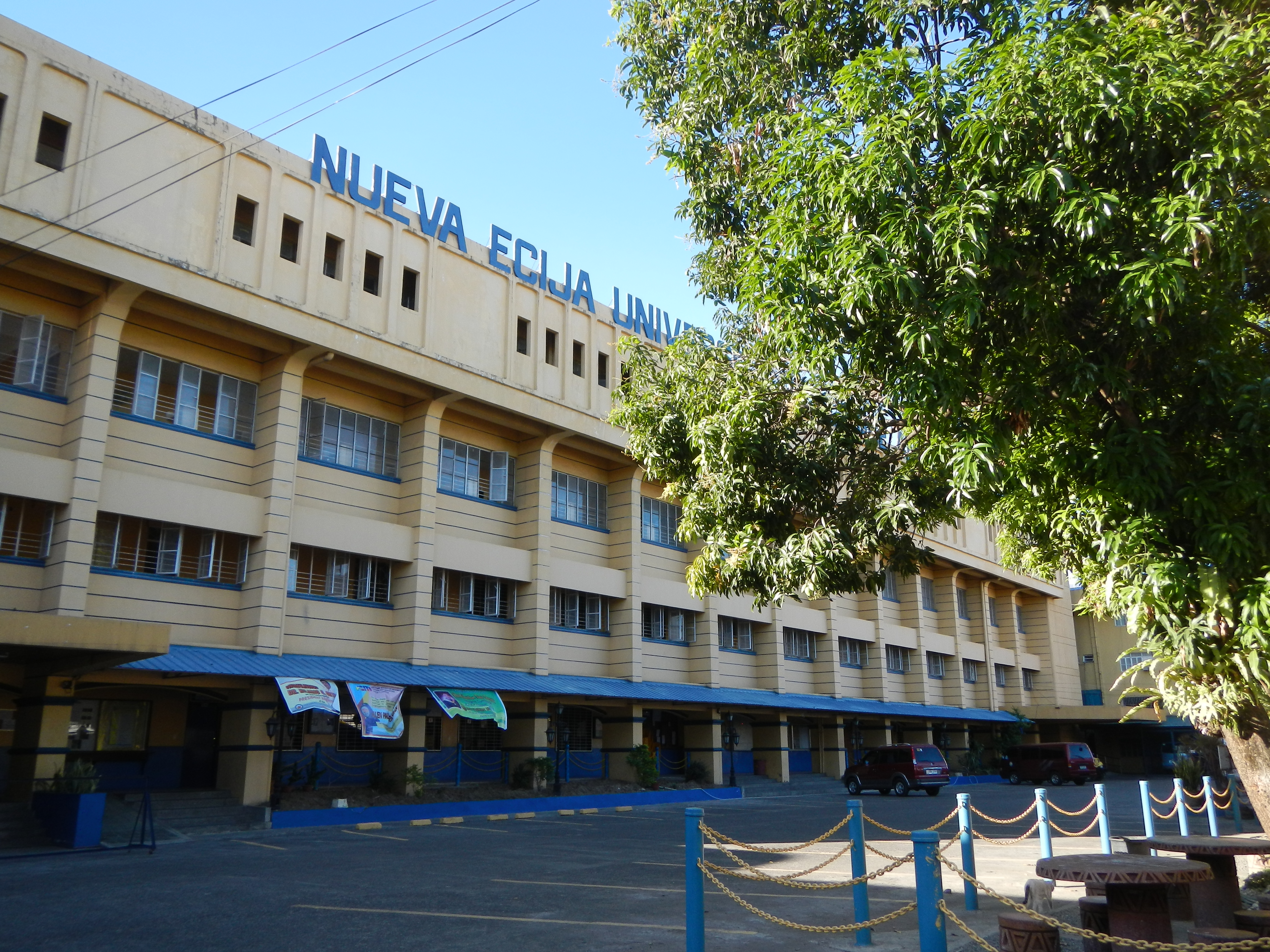
Nueva Ecija University of Science Technology - General Tinio Campus

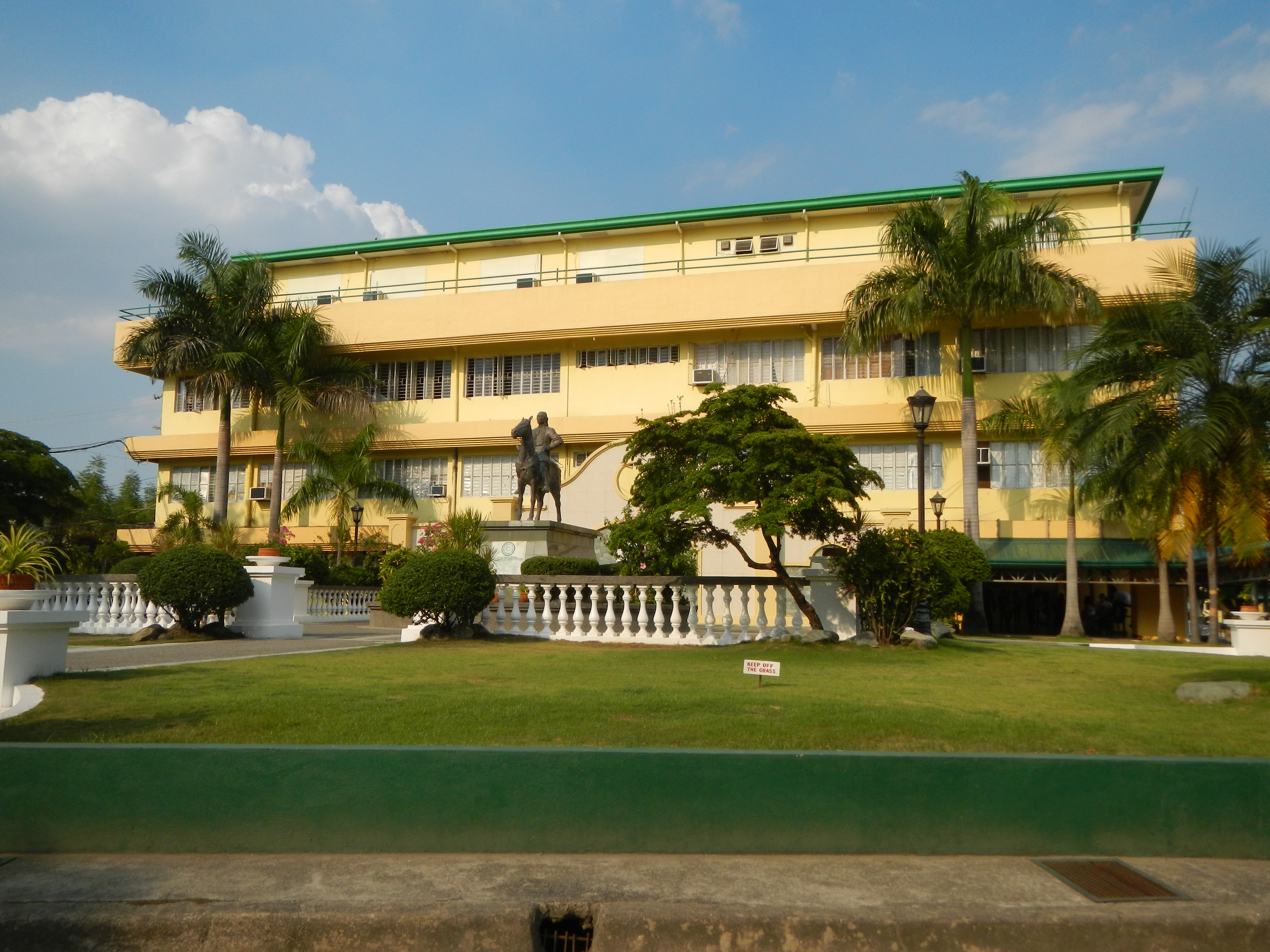
Wesleyan University Philippines

== Healthcare ==
Many hospitals and clinics can be found in the city, most are private and with modern facilities which made Cabanatuan the center for medical operations and research in the province. Most residents of the province go to Cabanatuan for their check-ups and appointments in hospitals and clinics within the city.

There are three (3) notable public and six (5 fully constructed, 1 under construction) private hospitals in Cabanatuan:

No.	Name	Location	Remarks	Image
1	Dr. Paulino J. Garcia Memorial Research and Medical Center (PJGMRMC)	Brgy. Mabini Extension	It is the 400-bed modern multi-story regional health center of Cabanatuan. It was opened to the public on December 15, 1930, with a capacity of thirty (30) beds. The hospital has since been designated as the region's specialty center for heart and lung, kidney transplant, trauma, brain, orthopedic, physical medicine and rehabilitation, eye, and reproductive health. The hospital's bed capacity is planned to be increased to 1000 beds in the near future.	Dr. Paulino J. Garcia Memorial Research and Medical Center
2	Eduardo L. Joson Memorial Hospital (Nueva Ecija Provincial Hospital)	Maharlika Highway, Brgy. Daang Sarile	It is a government-owned hospital located along the Maharlika Highway, Brgy. Daang Sarile.	E.L.J. Memorial Hospital
3	Dr. M.V. Gallego Cabanatuan City General Hospital	Maharlika Highway, Brgy. Imelda	It is a local government-funded hospital that offers health services mostly to the people of Cabanatuan, Nueva Ecija, and to some extent to the neighboring municipalities. It has since undergone rehabilitation to add more modern facilities and cater to the growing healthcare of the city.	M.V. Gallego Cabanatuan City General Hospital
4	Immaculate Conception Medical Center of Central Luzon (ICMC)	Circumferential Road, Brgy. San Juan Accfa	A private-owned hospital located in Circumferential Road, Brgy. San Juan Accfa. It was established by a group of doctors and businessmen-investors and was opened on September 8, 2007.	ICMC
5	Nueva Ecija Doctors' Hospital	Maharlika Highway, Brgy. Sumacab Este	A private hospital started by a group of 22 American-trained doctors, headed by Dr. Rodrigo Cuizon, who arrived in Nueva Ecija during the 1960s to settle and practice their profession at Cabanatuan. The hospital has since been undergoing renovations to add more facilities.	Nueva Ecija Doctors' Hospital
6	GoodSam Medical Center	Burgos Avenue	It is a private hospital part of the network of hospitals of Mt. Grace Hospitals (MGHI). At present, GoodSam has an eye and laser center, a fresenius renal center and major components of a secondary hospital in both Cabanatuan and Gapan, an out-patient department, emergency room, imaging center, operating and delivery room complex and intensive care unit. (ICU)	GoodSam Medical Center
7	Premiere Medical Center	Maharlika Highway, Brgy. Daan Sarile	A private hospital that has been serving the city's residents since 1997.	Premiere Medical Center
8	Wesleyan University General Hospital and Cardiovascular Center	Brgy. Mabini Extension	Non-stock, non-profit hospital owned and operated by the United Methodist Church through the Wesleyan University – Philippines (WU–P). It is located within the campus of Wesleyan University - Philippines.	Wesleyan University Medical Center
9	Cabanatuan Doctors Medical Center (CMC)	Emilio Vergara Highway, Brgy. Valle Cruz	An under-construction private hospital situated along Emilio Vergara Highway, Brgy. Valle Cruz.	

== Notable people ==
First	Capital of Nueva Ecija; 1801–1850	Succeeded by San Isidro
Preceded by San Isidro	Capital of Nueva Ecija; 1912–1965	Succeeded by Palayan
