= Digitel =

Digitel may refer to:

- Digitel GSM, a mobile phone company in Venezuela
- Digital Telecommunications Philippines, commonly known as Digitel, a defunct mobile telecommunications company in the Philippines
  - Digitel Mobile Philippines, Inc., doing business as Sun Cellular, a former subsidiary
- Digitel Wireless, a wireless broadband integrator in the southeastern United States

== See also ==
- Data communication
