= Robinsons Gapan =

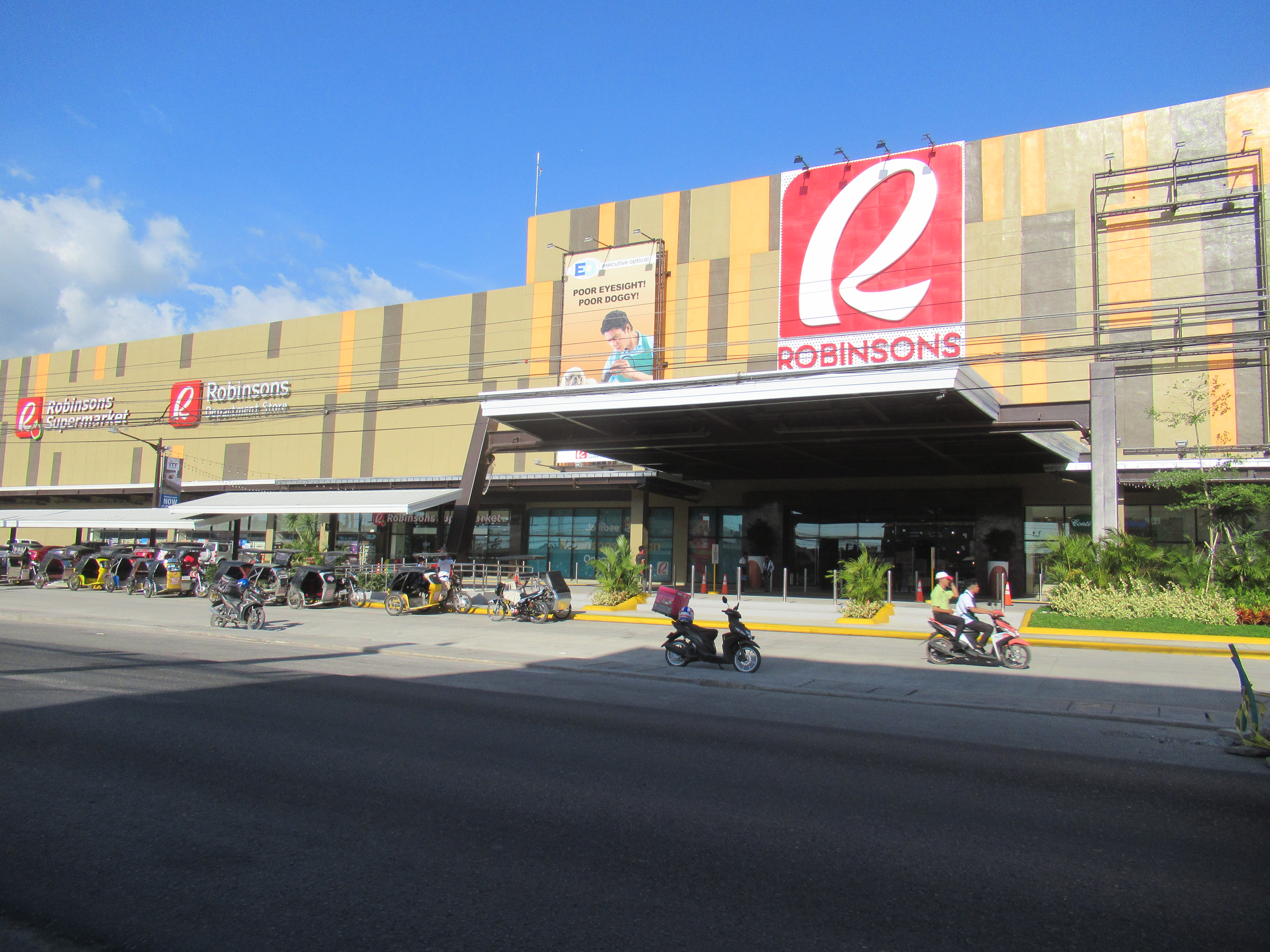
- Location: Gapan, Nueva Ecija, Philippines
- Coordinates: 15°18′3″N 120°56′53″E
- Address: Pan-Philippine Highway, Bayanihan
- Opened: November 30, 2022; 3 years ago
- Developer: JG Summit Holdings
- Manager: Robinsons Malls
- Owner: John Gokongwei
- Floor area: over 40,000 m^{2} (430,000 sq ft)
- Floors: 3
- Parking: more than 600 cars
- Website: Robinsons Gapan website

Robinsons Gapan is a shopping mall located along Pan-Philippine Highway in Gapan. It is owned and operated by Robinsons Land Corporation, one of the largest mall operators in the Philippines. The mall opened on November 30, 2022. The mall is the second Robinsons Mall in the province of Nueva Ecija, and the 53rd under the Robinsons brand. It is also the second-largest mall in Nueva Ecija, only behind SM City Cabanatuan. It has a gross floor area of over 40,000 m^{2}.

== Features ==
The mall anchors Robinsons Supermarket, Robinsons Department Store, Robinsons Movieworld, Eat Street, and other major anchors. The mall also houses other mainstream and local business outlets with Edna's Cakeland, NE Pacific Bakeshop, CLT Café, 3JR Pasalubong, and Tago Café. The mall features four state-of-the-art cinemas.

== Gallery ==
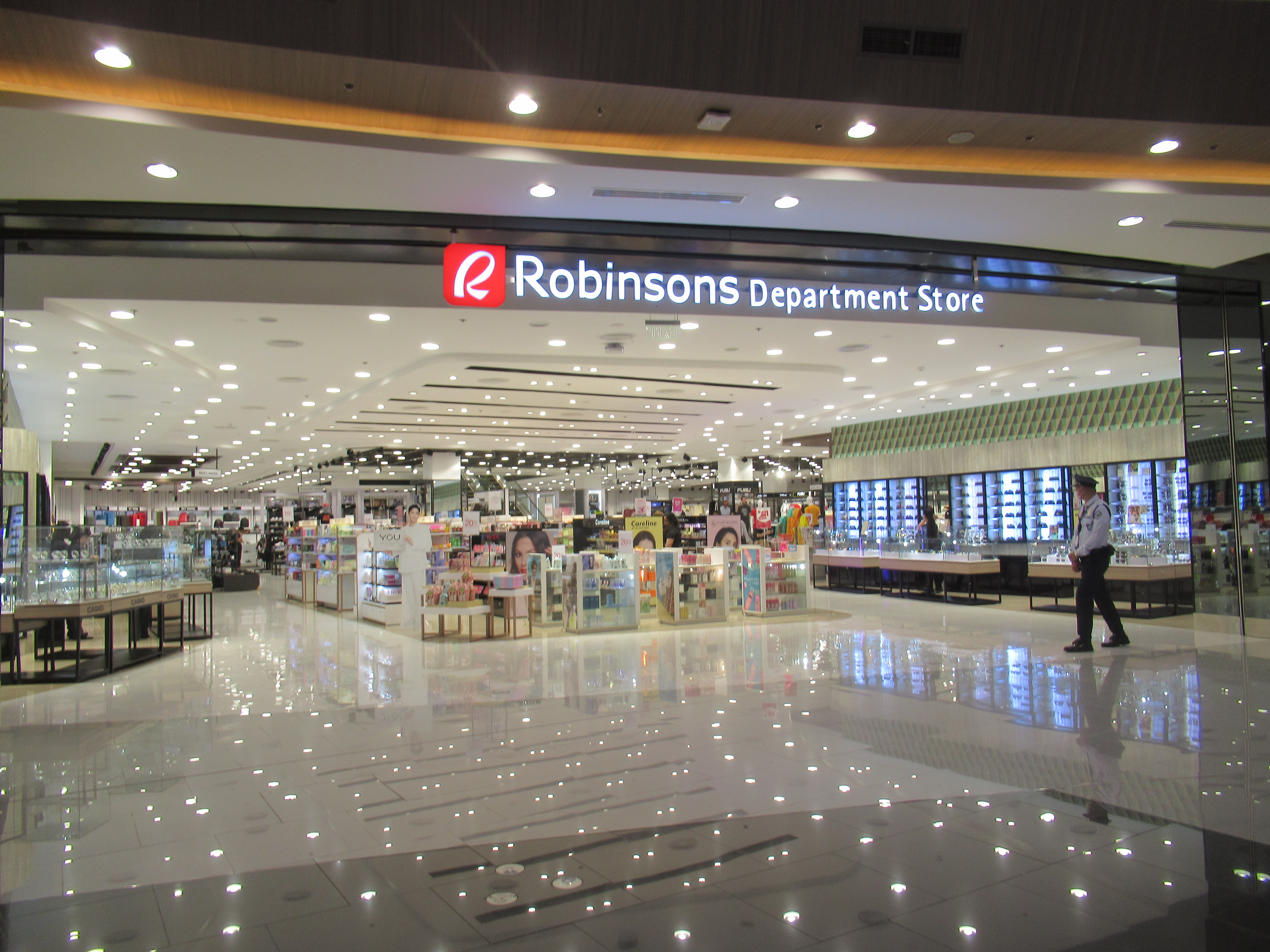
Robinsons Department Store

Robinsons Supermarket

Main atrium

Main atrium (another angle)

== See also ==
- SM City Cabanatuan
- Robinsons Townville Cabanatuan
- Robinsons Malls
- NE Pacific Mall
