= Robinsons Iligan =

Shopping mall in Iligan, Philippines

- Location: Iligan, Lanao del Norte, Philippines
- Coordinates: 8°13′07″N 124°14′23″E
- Address: Macapagal Ave.
- Opened: July 26, 2017; 9 years ago
- Developer: Robinsons Land Corporation
- Manager: Robinsons Malls
- Owner: John Gokongwei
- Num. of stores: 200+
- Floor area: 50,483 m^{2} (543,390 ft^{2})
- Floors: Mall: 3; Hotel: 5
- Parking: 500+ slots
- Website: www.robinsonsmalls.com

Robinsons Iligan (formerly known as Robinsons Place Iligan), is a shopping mall located along Macapagal Avenue in Iligan. It is owned and operated by Robinsons Land Corporation, one of the largest mall operators in the Philippines. The mall opened on July 26, 2017. The mall is the first Robinsons Mall in the province of Lanao del Norte, and the 44th in the Philippines. It is also the first stand-alone Robinsons Mall in Northern Mindanao prior to Robinsons Cagayan de Oro that is located inside Limketkai Center. It has a gross leasable area of 33,190 m^{2} and a gross floor area of 50,483 m^{2}.

== History ==
Robinsons Malls announced the opening of additional branches in Mindanao by 2014, one of which was in Iligan on the former Pryce Business Park which was sold to Robinsons Land Corporation.

The construction began on May 9, 2015 and took two years on its nearing completion. The mall's opening was originally scheduled on June 8, 2017. However, due to the Battle of Marawi, the opening was moved to July 26, 2017.

== Features ==
The three-storey mall features 6 anchor stores. It has Lingkod Pinoy Service Center, Food Gallery, specialty stores and restaurants, outdoor parking spaces and a transport terminal.

The architectural design is inspired by the city's majestic waterfalls. There is a waterfall feature with stream of water cascading from the upper levels down to the al fresco area of the mall.

The mall complex also features a five-storey Go Hotels, with 100 rooms and a function hall.
