= Robinsons Palawan =

Shopping mall in Puerto Princesa, Philippines

- Location: Puerto Princesa, Palawan, Philippines
- Coordinates: 9°46′02″N 118°44′54″E
- Address: National Highway, Barangay San Manuel
- Opened: May 24, 2012; 14 years ago
- Developer: JG Summit Holdings
- Manager: Robinsons Land
- Owner: John Gokongwei
- Num. of stores: Over 100 shops and restaurants
- Num. of anchor tenants: 6
- Floor area: 30,000 m^{2} (320,000 ft^{2})
- Floors: 2
- Website: robinsonsmalls.com

Robinsons Palawan (formerly known as Robinsons Place Palawan), is a shopping mall owned and operated by Robinsons Malls, the second largest mall operator in the Philippines. It is the 30th in the Robinsons mall chain and the first and largest full service mall in the province of Palawan. The mall opened on May 24, 2012.

The 16-hectare mall houses a 300-seat food court, al fresco dining outlets, fashion boutiques, specialty shops, banks, an amusement center, service outlets and cellphone and gadget shops. It is located 5 kilometers north of Puerto Princesa city proper along the North National Highway.

The mall complex includes a Go Hotels branch, a budget hotel brand also owned and operated by Robinsons Land Corporation (RLC).

In September 2014, the Department of Foreign Affairs inaugurated its first mall-based passport office in the Mimaropa region at the mall's second level.
