= Robinsons Butuan =

Shopping mall in Butuan, Philippines

- The expansion view of the Robinsons Place Butuan. Opened on August 2, 2017
- Location: Butuan, Philippines
- Coordinates: 8°56′32″N 125°31′12″E
- Address: J.C. Aquino Avenue, Brgy. Bayanihan
- Opened: Main Mall: November 25, 2013; 12 years ago Expansion Wing: August 2, 2017; 9 years ago
- Developer: Robinsons Land Corporation
- Owner: John Gokongwei
- Num. of stores: 200+ shops and restaurants
- Num. of anchor tenants: 9
- Floor area: 60,000 m^{2} (650,000 sq ft)
- Floors: Main Mall: 5 Expansion: 3
- Parking: 450 slots
- Website: robinsonsmalls.com

Robinsons Butuan (formerly known as Robinsons Place Butuan), is a shopping mall located in Jose C. Aquino Avenue (Butuan–Cagayan de Oro–Iligan Road), Brgy. Bayanihan, Butuan. It is Robinsons Land's 32nd commercial center in the Philippines and the 4th Robinsons Mall in Mindanao after Robinsons Cagayan de Oro, Robinsons Cybergate Davao and Robinsons GenSan. It covers an area of over 58,300 square metres (628,000 sq ft) making it the largest Robinsons Mall in Mindanao. It was opened to the public on November 25, 2013. The mall also includes Go Hotels, a 102-room hotel located on the fourth and fifth floors of the building’s east wing. One of the mall's main tenants is the DFA CO Butuan, the first passport office of the Department of Foreign Affairs in the Caraga region which opened in June 2015 at the mall's third level. An expansion wing, located beside the mall, was opened on August 2, 2017, and will feature more shops and restaurants plus the new integrated land transport terminal (bound for travel to and from Cagayan de Oro and Malaybalay (not operational) except for Davao and Surigao, which is based in the old Langihan Bus Terminal).

A side wall collapsed during the 2025 Davao Oriental earthquakes.

== Gallery ==
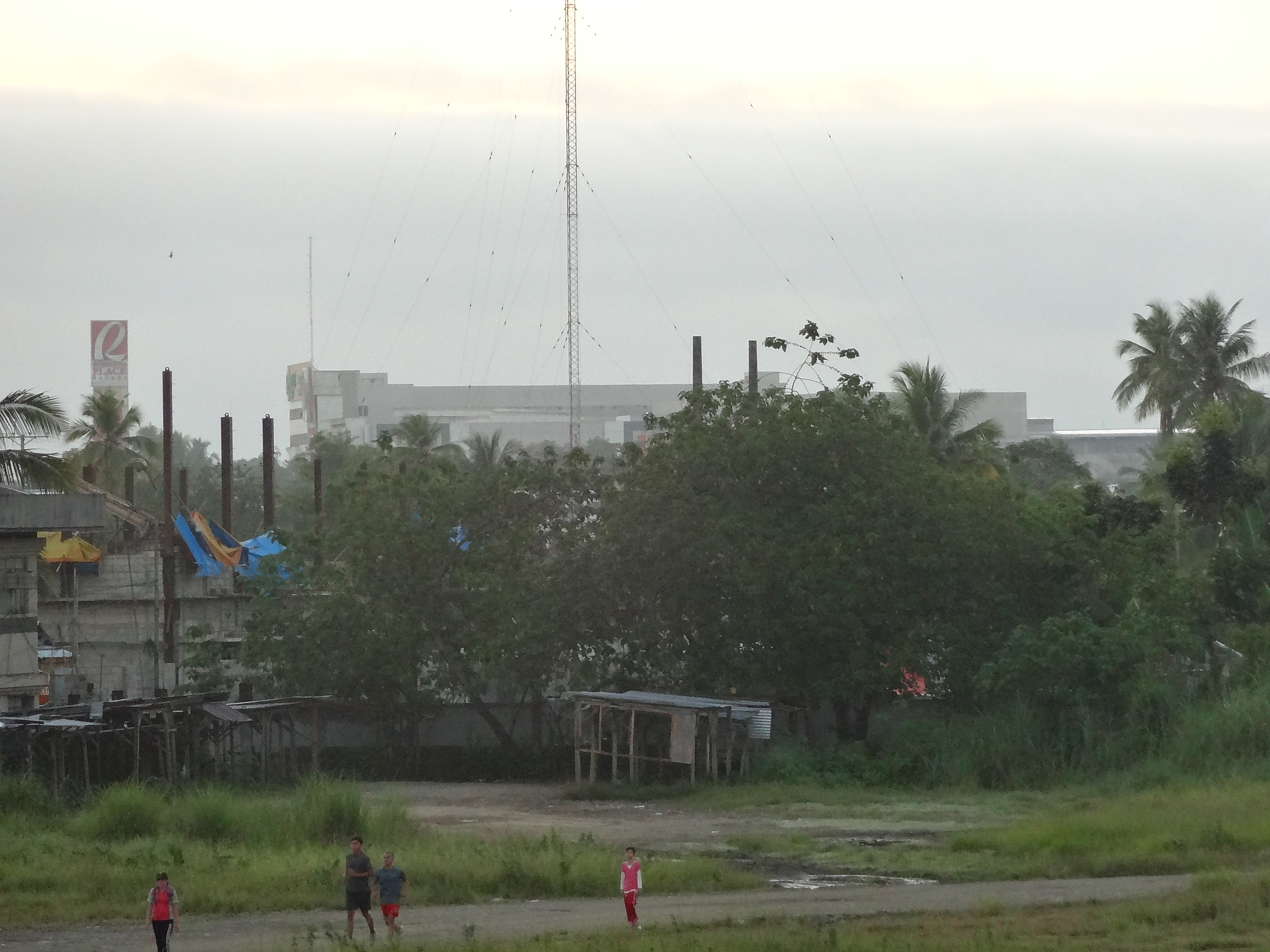
The side view of the Robinsons Place Butuan from Libertad Sports Complex. April 18, 2017

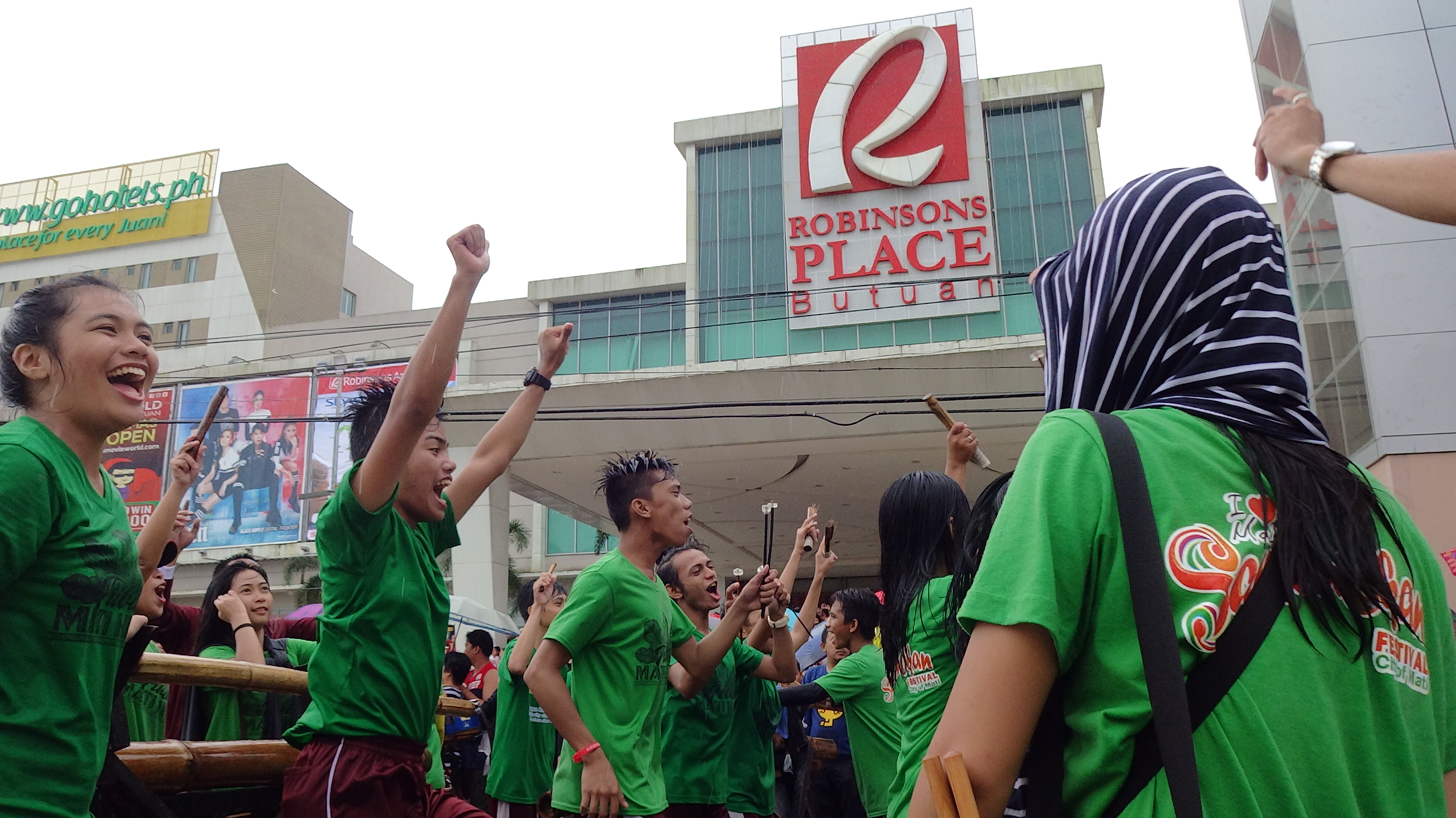
The main facade of the Robinsons Place Butuan during the Kahimunan Festival 2018.

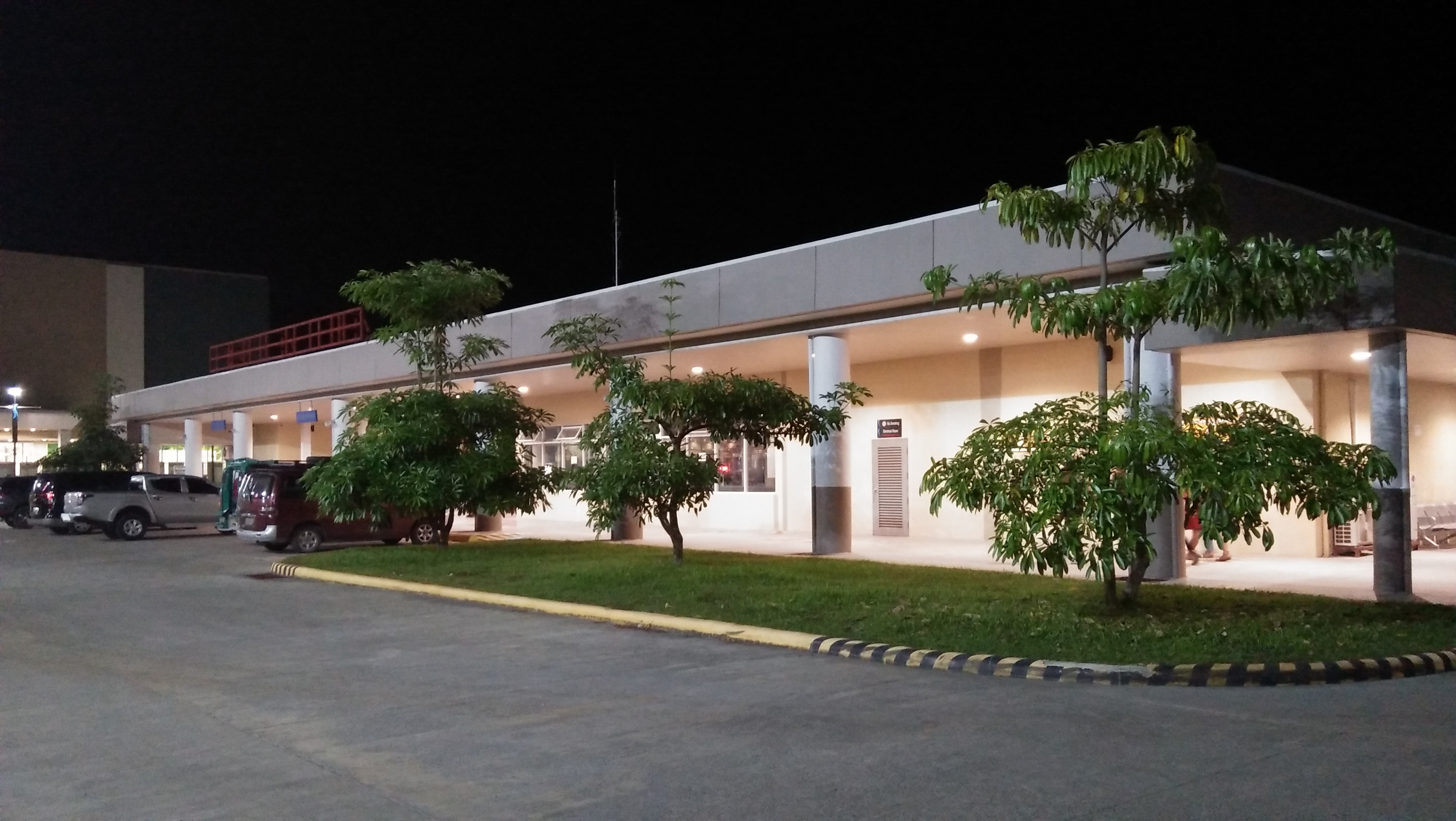
The southern terminal of Butuan.

== See also ==
- Robinsons Malls
- SM City Butuan
- List of shopping malls in the Philippines
