= Summit Hotels and Resorts =

Hotel chain in the Philippines

- Product type: Hotel chain
- Current owner: Robinsons Land Corporation
- Country: Philippines
- Introduced: 2009
- Markets: Philippines
- Website: www.summithotels.ph

Summit Hotels and Resorts is a Filipino brand of hotels owned and operated by Robinsons Land Corporation, the real estate arm of JG Summit Holdings established by Filipino-Chinese entrepreneur John Gokongwei Jr. It began operating in 2009 with the opening of its first hotel, Summit Ridge Tagaytay in Tagaytay, Cavite. As of 2020, the company has six hotels, all located in the Philippines.

== History ==
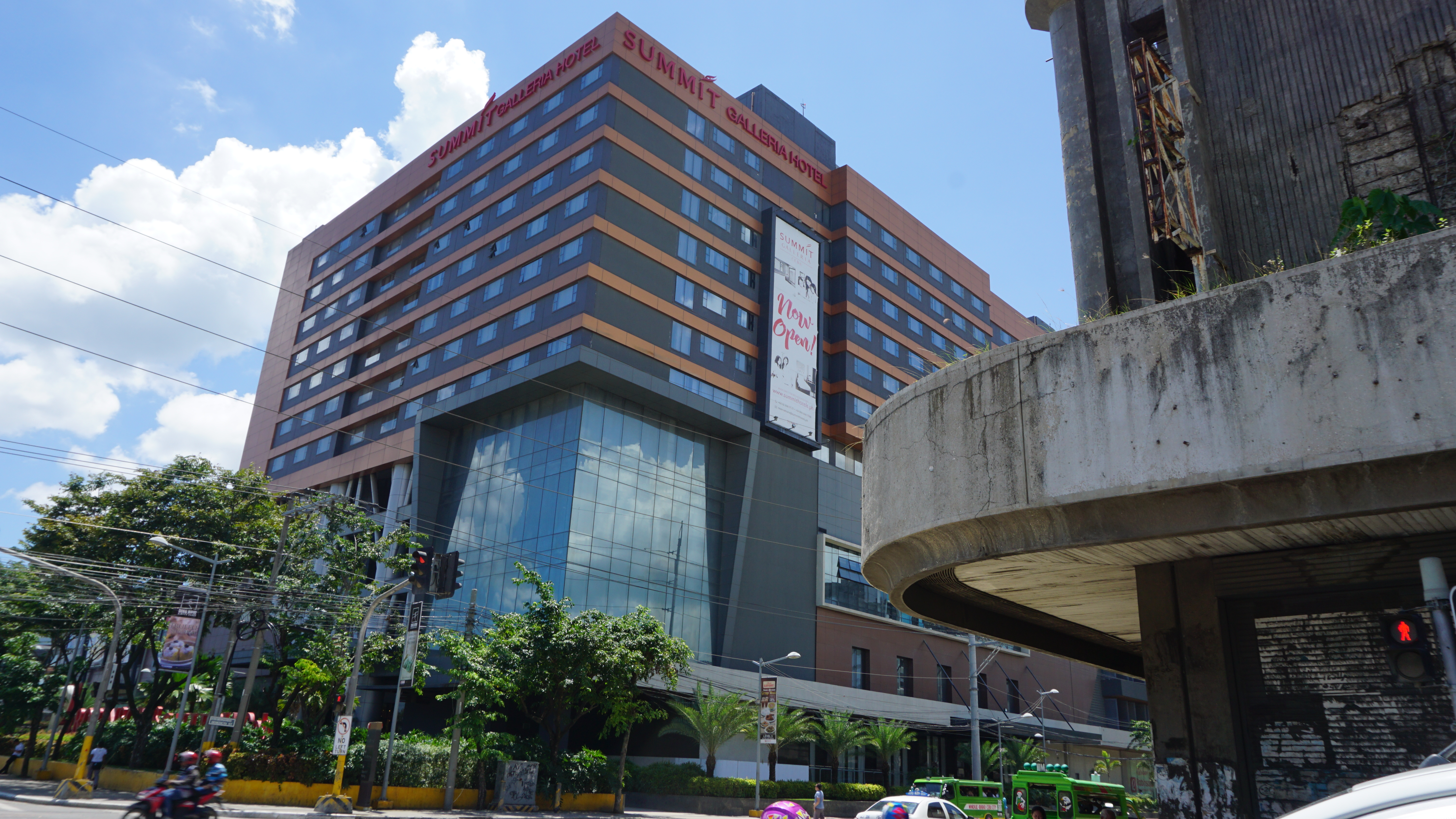
The Summit Galleria Hotel in Cebu City.

Robinsons Hotels and Resorts, is the largest hotel group in Philippines with 31 operating hotels and is the hospitality arm of RLC. Robinsons Land Corporation (RHR), the real estate arm of JG Summit Holdings, a business conglomerate established by Filipino-Chinese entrepreneur John Gokongwei Jr., first entered the hospitality industry in 2004 with the establishment of Robinsons Hotels and Resorts (RHR), its hospitality division. The company opened several luxury hotels in the country in partnership with various foreign hospitality brands, such as the Crowne Plaza Galleria and Holiday Inn Galleria, Dusit Thani Mactan Cebu, and The Westin Sonata Place Ortigas. As tourism in the Philippines continued to grow due to the increasing number of middle class travelers, RLC decided to tap into this hospitality market with the establishment of Summit Hotels and Resorts, its midscale hotel brand, and Go Hotels, its budget hotel brand, in 2009. That year, Summit Hotels and Resorts opened its first hotel in Tagaytay, Cavite, the 108-room Summit Ridge Tagaytay.

In June 2011, the company opened its second Summit hotel, the 210-room Summit Circle Hotel near Fuente Osmena Circle in Cebu City. The hotel was previously called the Cebu Midtown Hotel until it closed for renovations following a fire incident in the connecting shopping mall in April that year.

On March 11, 2015, the company opened the 82-room Summit Hotel Magnolia within the Robinsons Magnolia shopping center in New Manila, Quezon City.

On March 14, 2017, the company opened Summit Galleria Cebu in Cebu City. The 220-room hotel is located within the newly constructed Robinsons Galleria Cebu shopping mall near the city's Pier 4.

On June 22, 2018, the 138-room Summit Hotel Tacloban opened in Tacloban, Leyte. It is located beside Robinsons Place Tacloban in Barangay Marasbaras.

On September 17, 2019, the 100-room Summit Hotel Greenhills opened in San Juan, Metro Manila, making it the sixth property under the Summit brand.

In 2020, Summit Hotels and Resorts, along with its sister hotel brand Go Hotels, announced that it will convert some of its rooms in selected hotel branches into rental office space due to the low demand for accommodations and travel brought about by the COVID-19 pandemic in the Philippines.

== Loyalty program ==
In June 2016, Summit Hotels and Resorts, along with Go Hotels, launched a loyalty program wherein Robinsons Rewards cardholders can earn points for every PH₱400 spent on accommodations and add-on purchases, such as food and beverage, spa and other services availed at the hotel.

== Upcoming hotels ==
Summit Hotels and Resorts is set to open two more hotels in 2021 in General Santos and Naga, Camarines Sur.

== See also ==
- Go Hotels
- Robinsons Malls
