= Robinsons Jaro =

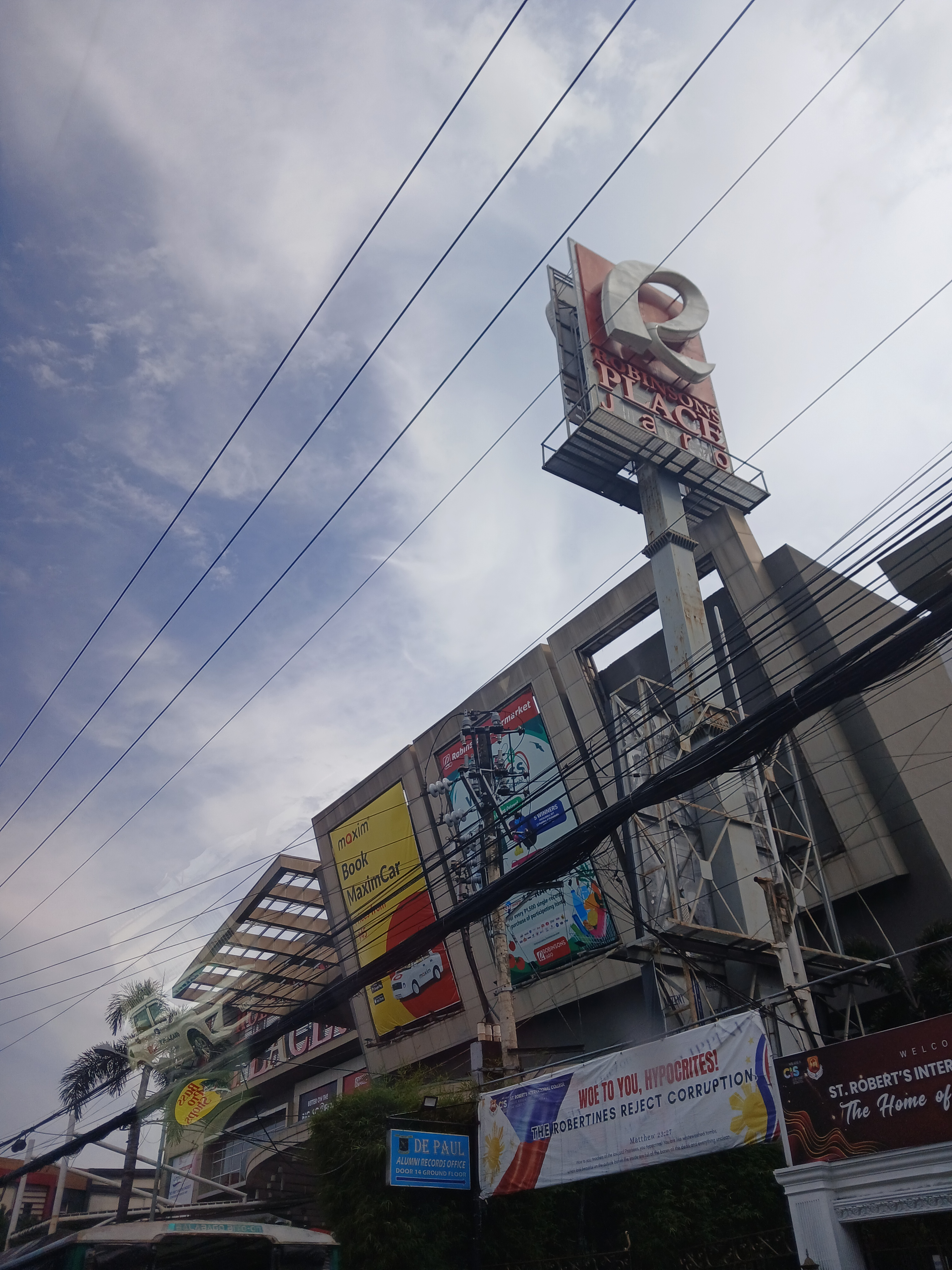
- Robinsons Place Jaro from East Lopez Street
- Location: Jaro, Iloilo City, Philippines
- Coordinates: 10°43′15″N 122°33′29″E
- Address: E. Lopez Street, Brgy. San Vicente, Jaro
- Opened: September 8, 2016; 10 years ago
- Developer: JG Summit Holdings
- Manager: Robinsons Land
- Owner: John Gokongwei
- Num. of stores: 250+
- Num. of anchor tenants: 7
- Floor area: 51,700 sqm.
- Floors: 4 (with basement)
- Parking: 366
- Website: robinsonsmalls.com/mall-info/robinsons-place-jaro

Robinsons Jaro (formerly known as Robinsons Place Jaro), is a shopping mall in Jaro, Iloilo City, Philippines. It is owned and operated by Robinsons Malls, the second largest mall operator in the Philippines. The mall was opened on September 8, 2016. It is the 42nd operating mall of Robinsons Land Corporation in the country and the second in Iloilo City, after Robinsons Iloilo in Iloilo City Proper.

Robinsons Jaro is located along E. Lopez Street in Barangay San Vicente in Jaro district of Iloilo City.

== Stores ==
The mall features anchors such as Robinsons Supermarket, Department Store, Daiso Japan, Handyman, Robinsons Appliances, and Robinsons Movieworld. Additionally, it boasts a 300-seater, garden-inspired food court and a Lingkod Pinoy Service Center located in the basement level of the mall complex. This service center extends participating government offices' commitment to ensuring expedient public service, ranging from business transactions to securing permits and public documents.
