= GoTyme Bank =

GoTyme Bank may refer to:

- GoTyme Bank (South Africa)
- GoTyme Bank (Philippines)
