= Robinsons Galleria South =

Shopping mall in Laguna, Philippines

- Robinsons Galleria South in 2019
- Location: San Pedro, Laguna, Philippines
- Coordinates: 14°21′07″N 121°03′42″E
- Address: Km. 31 National Highway, Brgy. Nueva
- Opened: July 19, 2019; 7 years ago
- Developer: Robinsons Land
- Manager: Robinsons Malls
- Owner: John Gokongwei
- Num. of stores: 300
- Num. of anchor tenants: 5
- Floor area: 115,000 m^{2} (1,240,000 ft^{2})
- Floors: 4
- Public transit: 15 Hernandez Street
- Website: www.robinsonsmalls.com

Robinsons Galleria South (also known and branded as Galleria South) is a mall development located in Nueva, San Pedro, Laguna, Philippines. The mall is the first upscale shopping center in San Pedro City. The mall is owned and operated by Robinsons Malls. It is the third Robinsons Mall to bear the Galleria branding after Robinsons Galleria and Robinsons Galleria Cebu. The mall opened on July 19, 2019.

== History ==
Robinsons Galleria South, located along the Old National Highway in San Pedro City, Laguna, is the third Galleria-branded mall in the country, following the flagship Robinsons Galleria in Ortigas and Robinsons Galleria Cebu. In 2013, Robinsons Land Inc. initially planned Robinsons Place San Pedro after demolishing the old Cosmos Bottling Plant. After years of delay, the mall construction started in 2017, and from Robinsons Place San Pedro, the name was changed to Robinsons Galleria South. The mall opened on July 19, 2019, making it the 52nd Robinsons Mall. This is the company's tenth mall in the Calabarzon region. With a total gross floor area of more than 70,000 square meters, this four-level mall consists of retail shops and a wide array of restaurants. This is the city's first full-scale shopping center.

== Mall features ==
The main mall is a four-level lifestyle center developed on a 3.8-hectare (9.4-acre) which used to be a soda bottling plant and a seven-story tall parking building occupies a 3.8-hectare (9.4-acre) lot and has a total of 115,000-square-meter (1,240,000 sq ft) retail space, including the parking building. The mall feature Eat Streat with a variety of establishments. Galleria South has an area devoted to Japanese and Korean Brand called JK Town, as well as a digital playground called PlayLab, third branch in the country. It has also its very own Catholic chapel named after St. Teresa of Calcutta. It is also near Sto. Sepulcro Parish Church, home to the highly devoted Lolo Uweng.

The four-story shopping center is anchored by Robinsons staples like Robinsons Department Store, Robinsons Supermarket, Robinsons Appliances and Robinsons Movieworld.

The Mall also houses three government satellite offices, Overseas Workers Welfare Administration (OWWA), PhilHealth, Social Security System (SSS) at Lingkod Pinoy Center.
