= Pueblo de Panay =

Mixed-use development in Capiz, Philippines

Coordinates: 11°33′41″N 122°44′51″E

Project
- Opening date: 2014; 12 years ago
- Developer: Pueblo de Panay, Incorporated (PDPI)
- Operator: Pueblo de Panay, Incorporated (PDPI)
- Owner: Sacred Heart of Jesus Prime Holdings, Incorporated (SHJPHI)
- Website: Official website

Location
- Location: Roxas City, Capiz, Philippines

Pueblo de Panay Township is a 670-hectare (1,700-acre) mixed-use community development in Roxas City, Capiz, Philippines, by Pueblo de Panay, Inc. (PDPI). It is the largest township development in the Visayas region of the Philippines, with approximately 55,000 daily foot traffic. With the advocacy Life.Work.Balance, it has designated areas for different uses seamlessly integrated to one another.

== Location ==
Pueblo de Panay is located in Roxas City, which has a population of 179,292 based on the 2020 National Census Survey, and is the capital city of Capiz province (804,952 people based on the same census).

Pueblo de Panay spans the areas of Barangays Lawaan, Dinginan and Sibaguan in Roxas City. It connects to Roxas Avenue Extension along Lawaan, Roxas City and Sibaguan Highway. It is home to Robinsons Place Roxas, the New Roxas City Public Transportation Terminal, Child’s Academy, the New Roxas City Police Station, Cafe Pueblo, Ramboys, Festa, Hotel Veronica, Urban Manor, and other commercial and residential establishments.

== History ==
Pueblo de Panay is named after the historic town of Pan-ay in the Province of Capiz, the second oldest Spanish settlement in the Philippines. It adopts the “Pueblo” or small Spanish town concept of development; wherein the center of governance, education, religion, commerce, culture, recreation and other important community activities are integrated in a central “plaza” or park.

Pueblo de Panay is the largest, contiguous, master-planned development among the capital cities and towns of Panay Island and the whole Visayas. Phase 1 of the development (which is more than 130 hectares) is at the center of the city, being less than two kilometers from the Roxas City fountain, the center of old Roxas City or old Pueblo de Capiz. Phase 2 (which is more or less than 170 hectares) is under development for residential purposes.

== Facilities ==
Pueblo de Panay has a commercial business district complemented by eco-tourism areas, a special economic zone and educational, institutional and recreational facilities.

=== Commercial ===
==== Pueblo de Panay Central Business District ====
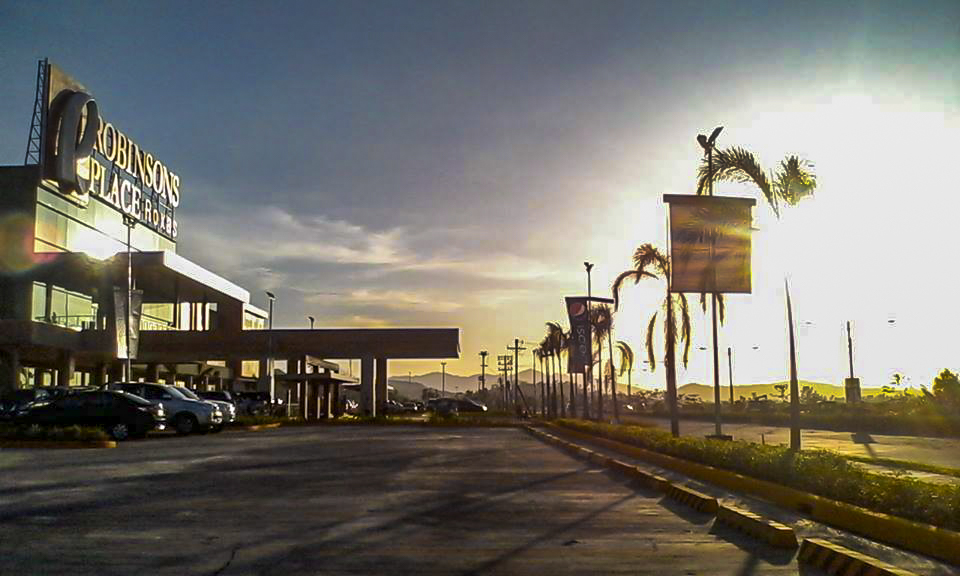
Robinsons Place Roxas

The Central Business District of Pueblo de Panay is introducing a PEZA-approved Special Economic Zones. Currently, it has secured approval from Philippine Economic Zone Authority for its Information Communication Technology Zone and Eco-Cultural Tourism Zone.

A 120-room Pueblo de Panay Hotel is planned to be built next to El Circulo Convention Center.

The first shopping mall to be situated in Pueblo de Panay is Robinsons Place Roxas. It is a shopping mall located at Immaculate Heart of Mary Avenue, Lawa-an, Roxas City, Capiz. The mall has a Gross Floor Area of 38,000 sq.m. and has a total Land Area of 75,000 sq.m. It is the 36th operating mall of Robinsons Land Corporation. It is the first full service mall and the largest in Northern Panay island. Robinsons Place Roxas houses over 160 outlets for shopping, dining, service and entertainment.
