= Robinsons Roxas =

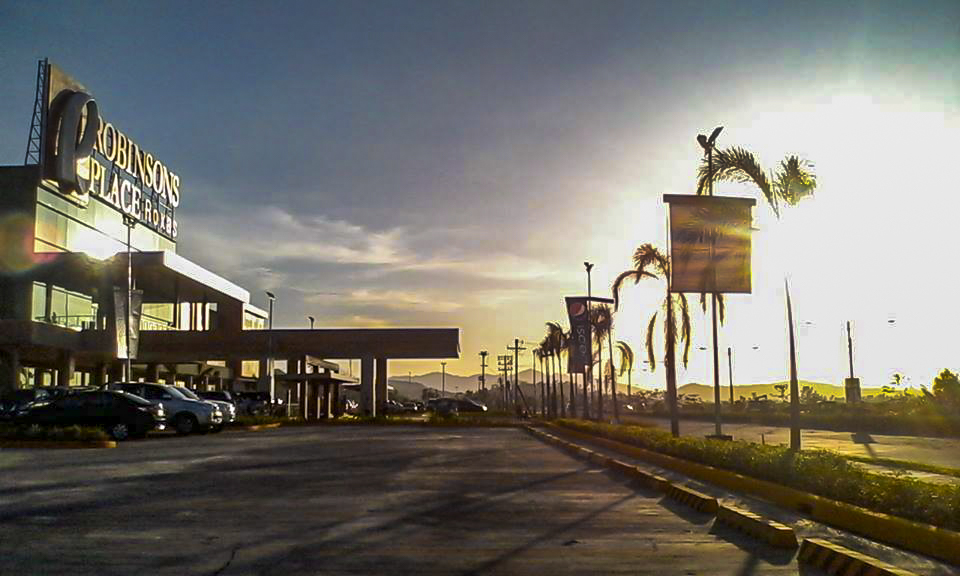
- Location: Roxas City, Capiz, Philippines
- Coordinates: 11°34′6″N 122°45′5″E
- Address: Immaculate Heart of Mary Avenue, Brgy. Lawa-an, Pueblo de Panay
- Opened: February 13, 2014; 12 years ago
- Developer: Robinsons Land Corporation
- Manager: Robinsons Malls
- Owner: John Gokongwei
- Num. of stores: 160+
- Num. of anchor tenants: 11
- Floor area: 37,400 m^{2} (403,000 sq ft)
- Floors: 2
- Parking: 800 slots
- Website: robinsonsmalls.com/mall-info/robinsons-place-roxas

Robinsons Roxas (formerly known as Robinsons Place Roxas), is a shopping mall located at Immaculate Heart of Mary Avenue, Brgy. Lawa-an, Roxas City, Capiz. The mall has a gross floor area of 37,400 m^{2} (403,000 sq ft) and has a total land area of 74,000 m^{2} (800,000 sq ft). It is the 35th operating mall of Robinsons Land Corporation.

The mall was supposedly to open on December 2, 2013 but moved to February 13, 2014 after Typhoon Haiyan (Yolanda) struck Roxas City.

== Overview ==
A two-level full service mall, Robinsons Place Roxas houses over 160 outlets for shopping, dining, service and entertainment. It has four digital cinemas including one 3D cinema and also includes a parking lot with over 800 car slots and 200 motorcycle slots. It is the first full service mall and the second-largest in Northern Panay island.

== Location ==
It is located in Pueblo de Panay, a 670-hectare (1,700-acre) mixed-use, master planned township development in Roxas City.

== See also ==
- Robinsons Malls
- SM City Roxas
- SM Supermalls
