= Robinsons Bank =

Defunct bank in the Philippines (1997–2024)

Robinsons Bank Corporation
- Formerly: Robinsons Savings Bank (1997–2011)
- Type: Subsidiary
- Industry: Financial services
- Founded: November 1997
- Defunct: January 1, 2024
- Fate: Merged with the BPI as surviving entity
- Successor: Bank of the Philippine Islands; GoTyme Bank
- Headquarters: Quezon City, Philippines
- Key people: Lance Gokongwei (Chairman); Frederick D. Go (Vice Chairman); Elfren Antonio S. Sarte (President & CEO)
- Services: Banking
- Owner: JG Summit Holdings
- Website: www.robinsonsbank.com.ph

Robinsons Bank Corporation, also known as RBank, was a Filipino commercial bank that provided banking services for retail and business customers.

== History ==
The company was formerly known as Robinsons Savings Bank and changed its name to Robinsons Bank Corporation in May 2011. Robinsons Bank Corporation was founded in 1997 and was based in Quezon City with branches across the Philippines. Robinsons Bank Corporation operates as a subsidiary of JG Summit Holdings, Inc. In 2012, Robinsons Bank acquired majority ownership of the Legazpi Savings Bank based in Legazpi, Albay.

On September 30, 2022, Robinsons Bank, together with the Bank of the Philippine Islands, disclosed that their merger was expected to be completed by 2023, with BPI as the surviving entity.

The merger took effect on January 1, 2024, with BPI targeting to complete its integration with the remaining branches of Robinsons Bank by October 2025.

== See also ==
- List of banks in the Philippines
- BancNet
