= Robinsons GenSan =

Shopping mall in General Santos, Philippines

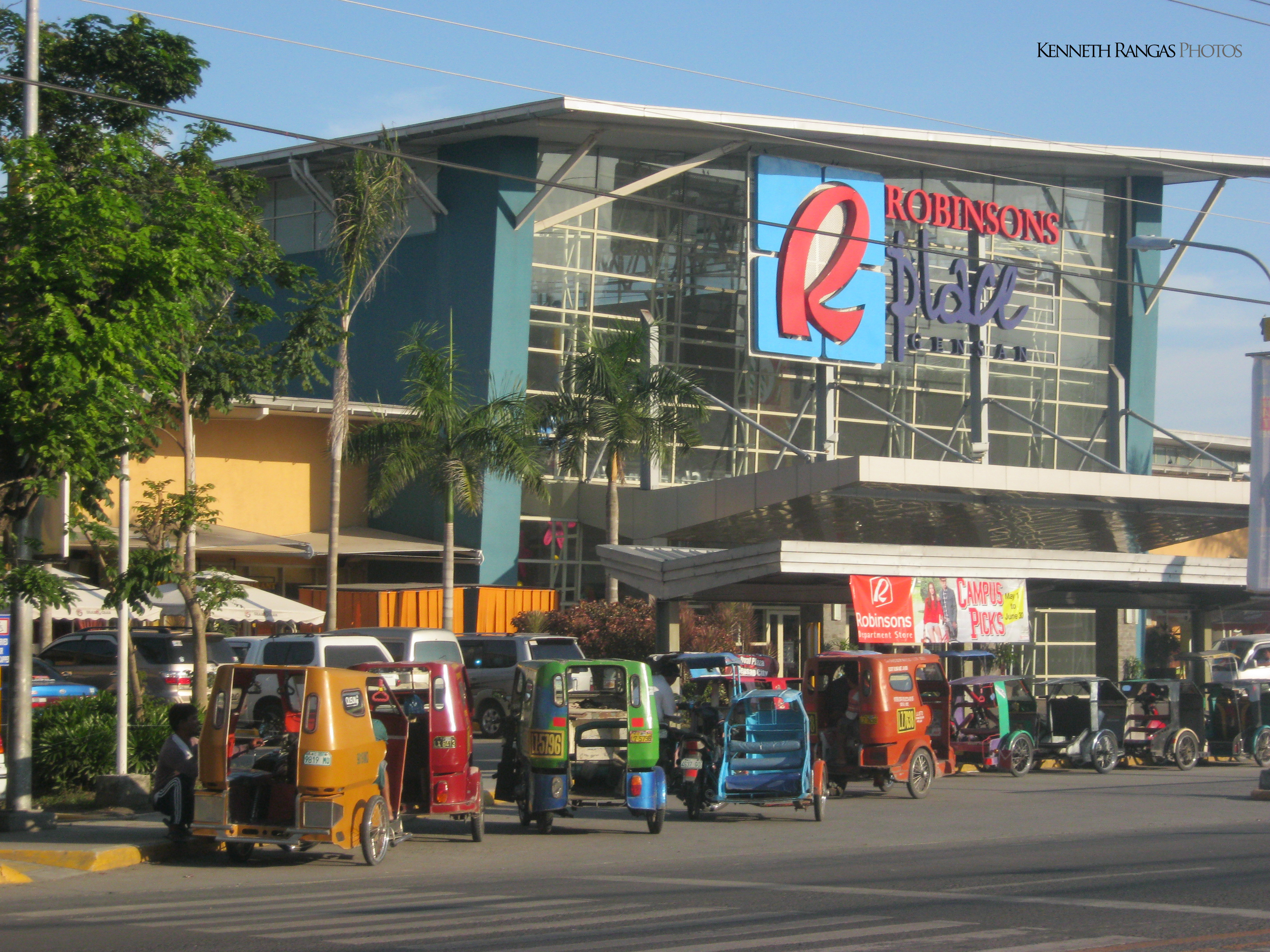
- Location: Lagao, General Santos, Philippines
- Coordinates: 6°07′16″N 125°11′27″E
- Address: J. Catolico Avenue
- Opened: October 5, 2009; 17 years ago
- Developer: Robinsons Malls
- Manager: Robinsons Malls
- Owner: John Gokongwei
- Num. of stores: > 150 shops and restaurants
- Num. of anchor tenants: 7
- Floor area: 34,000 m^{2} (370,000 sq ft)
- Floors: 2
- Parking: 2000 cars
- Website: robinsonsmalls.com/malls_gensan.php

Robinsons GenSan (formerly known as Robinsons Place General Santos and Robinsons Place GenSan), is a mall located on Jose Catolico Avenue, Lagao, General Santos in the Philippines. The two-storey mall covers an area of over 34,000 m^{2} (370,000 sq ft) and is owned by John Gokongwei, founder of JG Summit Holdings and Robinsons Land Corporation. It was the flagship and largest mall of Robinsons Land Corporation in Mindanao (until Robinsons Butuan, upon its mall opening in November 2013). The mall had its soft opening on September 30, 2009 and the grand opening took place on Monday, October 5, 2009.

One of the mall's main tenants is the DFA Consular Office General Santos which opened at the ground floor in September 2012.

== Incidents ==
- In 2023, an earthquake caused damage to the mall interior.
- On June 8th 2026, the mall was severely affected by the 2026 Mindanao earthquake, causing some anchor stores and tenants to temporarily close until further notice. Tenants like the Robinsons Department Store have been reopened.
