= Digital Telecommunications Philippines =

Defunct telecommunications company in the Philippines

Digital Telecommunications Phils., Inc.
- Type: Subsidiary
- Traded as: PSE: DGTL (until 2011)
- Industry: Communications Services
- Founded: Manila, Philippines (October 1987; 39 years ago)
- Defunct: April 25, 2022; 4 years ago
- Fate: Absorbed into PLDT, Inc.
- Successor: PLDT
- Headquarters: Quezon City, Philippines
- Key people: Manuel V. Pangilinan, Chairman; Orlando B Vea, President and CEO
- Products: Broadband Services; Cellular Telephony; Fixed-Line Telephony; Information Technology Services
- Number of employees: 3,763
- Parent: JG Summit Holdings (1987–2011); PLDT (2011–2022)
- Website: www.digitel.ph

Digital Telecommunications Phils., Inc., commonly known as Digitel, was the second-largest fixed-line and the third-largest mobile telecommunications company in the Philippines. It was also the company that owned Sun Cellular, a mobile phone service.

The company was a subsidiary of PLDT (until April 25, 2022), one of the country's largest conglomerates.

== History ==
Digital Telecommunications Phils., Inc. was established in October 1987 and commenced commercial operations in January 1992.

In 1993, Digitel was awarded a 30-year exclusive contract by the Department of Transportation and Communications (DOTC) to manage, operate, develop and rehabilitate certain telecommunications systems owned by the DOTC (collectively, the "DOTC System") and which are located in the provincial areas of Luzon under a Facilities Management Agreement (FMA). The FMA also provided for its conversion into a lease contract under certain terms and conditions agreed upon by both parties.

In accordance with the provisions of the FMA, Digitel and DOTC agreed to amend and convert the FMA into a Financial Lease Agreement (FLA). Under the FLA, Digitel was granted the exclusive right to lease, manage, maintain, operate, develop and eventually own the said DOTC facilities.

In February 1994, Digitel was granted a national franchise to provide domestic and international telecommunications services throughout the Philippines. In September 1994, Digitel was granted by the National Telecommunications Commission (NTC) a provisional authority to operate an international gateway facility (IGF). A provisional authority was also secured from the NTC in January 1995 to install, operate, maintain and develop telecommunications facilities in Regions 1 to 5 including the facilities currently leased from DOTC.

=== Sun Cellular (2003–2022) ===
On August 7, 2000, Digitel was granted by the NTC a Provisional Authority (PA), authorizing it to construct, install, operate and maintain a Nationwide Cellular Mobile Telephone System (CMTS) using Global System for Mobile (GSM) and/or Code Division Multiple Access (CDMA) technology. Consequently, Digitel has been building a high-powered performance GSM/1800 network with a suite of applications and services.

On December 11, 2002, the President of the Philippines, Gloria Macapagal Arroyo signed into law, Republic Act No. 9180 granting Digitel Mobile Philippines Inc. (DMPI), a wholly owned subsidiary of Digitel, a franchise to construct, install, establish, operate and maintain wire and/or wireless telecommunications system throughout the Philippines.

In March 2003, DMPI commercially launched its wireless mobile services under the Sun Cellular brand. It pioneered the 24/7 Call & Text Unlimited in October 2004.

=== PLDT acquisition and closure ===
The Philippine Long Distance Telephone Company (PLDT) announced that it has completed the acquisition of Digitel from JG Summit Holdings, Inc. PLDT now owns 51.55 percent equity stake of Digitel. Digitel has a hundred percent stake in Digitel Mobile Philippines, Inc., whose brand name is Sun Cellular.

PLDT announced a tender offer for all Digitel common stock at the P1.60 per Digitel share, and offered either PLDT shares at P2,500 per share of cash, at the option of Digitel Shareholders. Assuming all of Digitel minority owners agree, the total transaction consideration would be PHP74.1 billion.

After the acquisition and assessment of the Digitel network, it was announced that the company was to be to delisted from the Philippine Stock Exchange (ticker DGTL) sometime from late 2011–2012. Its subscribers were transferred into the PLDT network from November 15 – December 31, 2012, when the last Digitel Business Centers were closed. However, Digitel retained the operation on its subsidiary, Sun Cellular.

Sun Cellular eventually ceased to operate on April 25, 2022, following its integration with PLDT's wireless firm, Smart Communications.

== Products ==
Digitel's fixed line services were offered under the Mango, Choice, and DigiFonePal brands. Its cellular service was sold under the Sun Cellular brand, while its broadband Internet services were sold under the Mango and NetVantage DSL brands.

== Subsidiaries ==
- Digitel Mobile Philippines, Inc.
- Digitel Capital Philippines Ltd.
- Digitel Information Technology Services, Inc.
- Asia Netcom Philippines Corporation (60%)
- Digital Crossing, Inc. (40%)
