= GoTyme Bank (Philippines) =

Digital bank in the Philippines

- Industry: Financial services; Banking
- Founded: October 20, 2022; 4 years ago
- Headquarters: Giga Tower, Quezon City, Philippines
- Key people: Nathaniel David Clarke (President and CEO)
- Parent: Gokongwei Group
- Website: www.gotyme.com.ph

GoTyme Bank (stylized as GOtyme bank) is a Filipino direct bank and a subsidiary of the Gokongwei Group.

== History ==
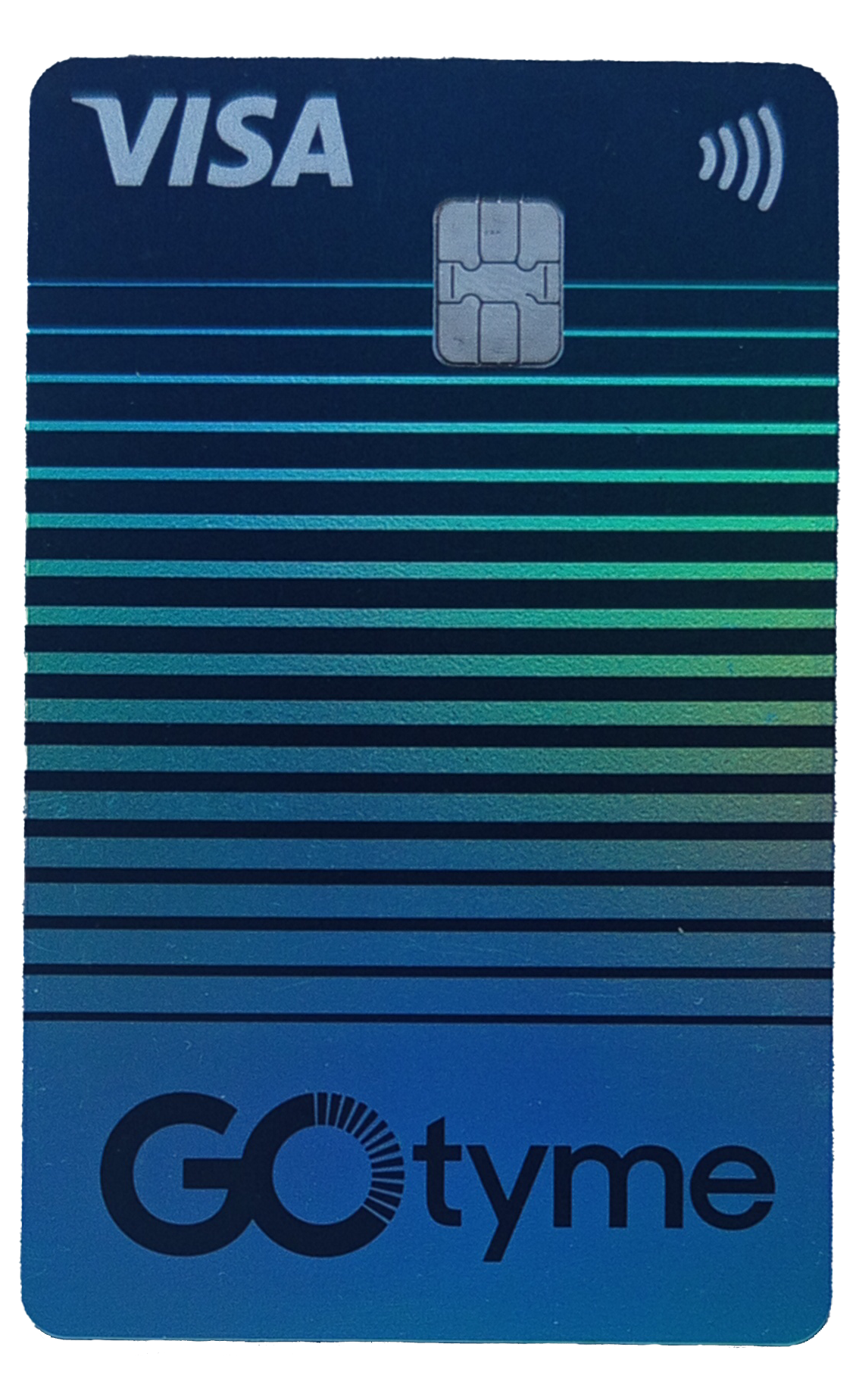
A GoTyme Bank debit card powered by Visa

The creation of GoTyme Bank was planned in 2021 by the Gokongwei Group as a joint venture with South African-owned TymeBank. The Gokongwei Group secured a certification to operate a digital bank from the Bangko Sentral ng Pilipinas in 2022.

On October 20, 2022, GoTyme Bank was formally launched. As the Gokongwei Group owned Robinsons Bank when it launched, JG Summit President Lance Gokongwei stated that the Ayala-owned Bank of the Philippine Islands will be GoTyme Bank's shareholder once BPI's merger with Robinsons Bank is completed, which took effect on January 1, 2024. However, on March 22, 2024, BPI announced that it will divest its stake in GoTyme, citing a "potential conflict of interest" and significant overlapped in their Digital banking product offerings.

On May 22, 2024, GoTyme's CEO Albert Raymund O. Tinio signed a memorandum of understanding with the Department of Information and Communications Technology's CICC Director Alexander K. Ramos at the National Cybercrime Hub in Bonifacio Global City. Its "Whole-of-Society" approach aims to fight financial fraud, including cyberattack on e-commerce transactions, in collaboration with Scam Watch Pilipinas.

== See also ==
- Digital banks in the Philippines
- Neobank
- Robinsons Bank
