= Robinsons Galleria Cebu =

Shopping mall in Cebu City, Philippines

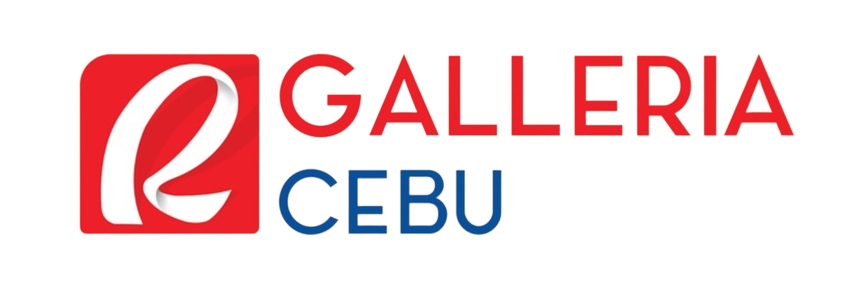

- Robinsons Galleria Cebu in 2024.
- Location: General Maxilom Avenue corner Osmeña Boulevard, Brgy. Tejero, Cebu City, Philippines
- Coordinates: 10°18′15″N 123°54′40″E
- Opened: December 10, 2015; 10 years ago
- Developer: Robinsons Land
- Manager: Robinsons Malls
- Owner: John Gokongwei
- Num. of stores: 300
- Num. of anchor tenants: 6
- Floor area: 158,000 m^{2} (1,700,000 ft^{2})
- Floors: 4 (Mall); 3 (BPO towers)
- Parking: 1,000 cars
- Public transit: 01B 01C Private; 02B Pier; 08F Alumnos - SM City Cebu; 12G 12I Labangon; 10H 10M Bulacao, Pardo - SM City Cebu; 21A 21D 22A 22D Mandaue; 23A Pajo Terminal; 23D MEZ 2 Estate; 24 Consolacion; 25 Liloan; CL Plaza Independencia, Danao; MB SM J Mall - SM Seaside City (via SM City Cebu, Parkmall); MB SM City Cebu - Anjo World; KMK Minglanilla, Naga
- Website: www.robinsonsmalls.com/mall-info/robinsons-galleria-cebu

Robinsons Galleria Cebu (also known and branded as Galleria Cebu), is a shopping mall and mixed-use development located in Sergio Osmeña Boulevard cor. General Maxilom Avenue, North Reclamation Area, Tejero, Cebu City. It is the 2nd Robinsons Mall to bear the Galleria branding after Robinsons Galleria. The mall opened on December 10, 2015. The mall is just a few meters from the Port of Cebu and approximately 1 kilometre (0.62 mi) away from SM City Cebu. The mall is owned and operated by Robinsons Malls. It is the firm's third largest mall (after Robinsons Manila and its namesake, Robinsons Galleria, in Ortigas, Metro Manila).

== History ==
In 2008, Robinsons Land, Inc. announced that they have bought a 4-hectare (9.9-acre) prime property near the Port of Cebu. The company bared that they planned to build a mall, a three-storey BPO tower, a 153-room Go Hotel (which would have been the first in Cebu), 9,000 m^{2} (97,000 sq ft) of office space and a couple of high-rise condominiums. The development was initially called Robinsons Maxilom, named after General Maxilom Avenue, the road it directly borders to. The project was then renamed to its current name a couple of years later. The project broke ground in July 2012 and construction followed soon. The mall opened on December 10, 2015, exactly two weeks after another mall, SM Seaside City Cebu by rival group SM Supermalls opened.

== Mall features ==
The main mall is four storeys tall, while a BPO building with a total floor space of 9,000 m^{2} (97,000 sq ft) is three storeys tall. There will be six cinemas in the mall. The mall also has an al fresco dining area and the mall's interiors feature lush gardens. In 2017, Summit Galleria Cebu, the flagship hotel of the Summit Hotels and Resorts brand, opened within the mall building. The 220-room hotel includes a dining outlet, Cafe Summit. When fully completed, the development will include BPO towers and three high-rise condominiums at the back of the mall.

== Incidents ==
=== 2022 former White Gold building collapse ===
On December 10, 2022, at around 4:20 PM PST, The nearby abandoned White Gold Shopping Mall, collapsed due to weathering, and traffic congestion. Some of the nearby roads had to be temporarily closed. Including B. Benedicto St, in which neighbors the mall on the northwest, near the Summit Hotel. However, the mall has not been damage, nor injured anyone on B. Benedicto St, near the mall, or in the abandoned building.

== Gallery ==
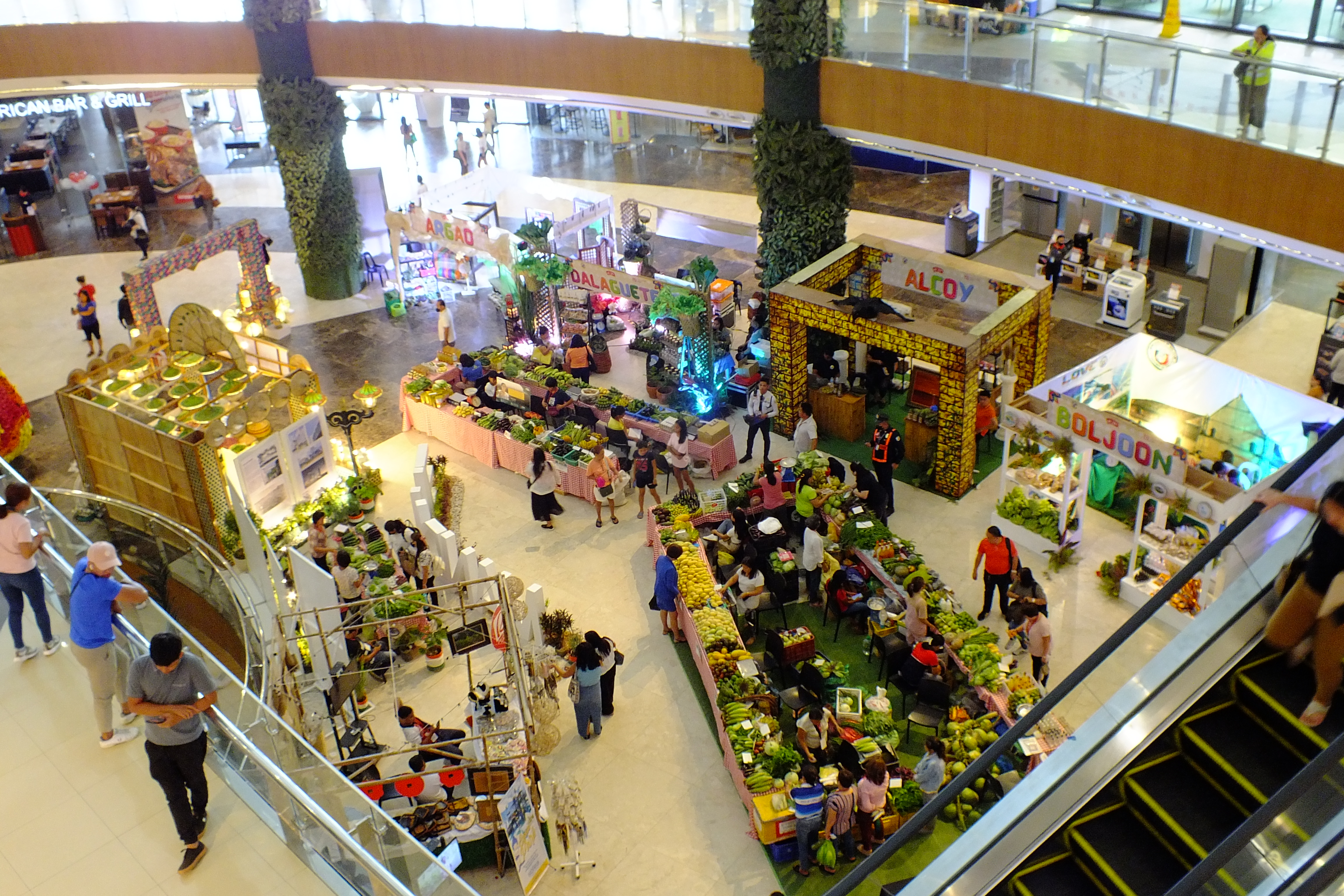
Ground floor

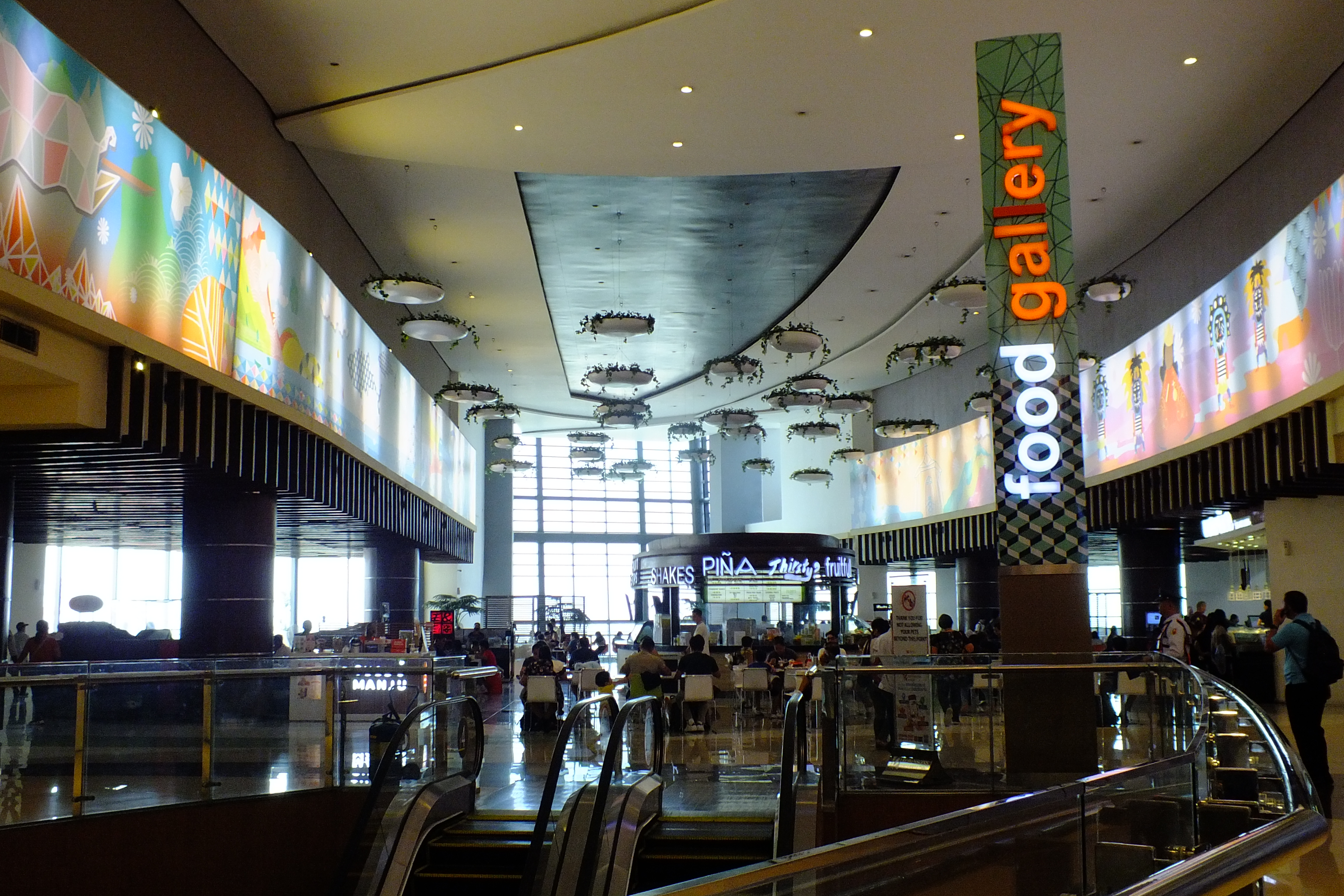
Food Gallery

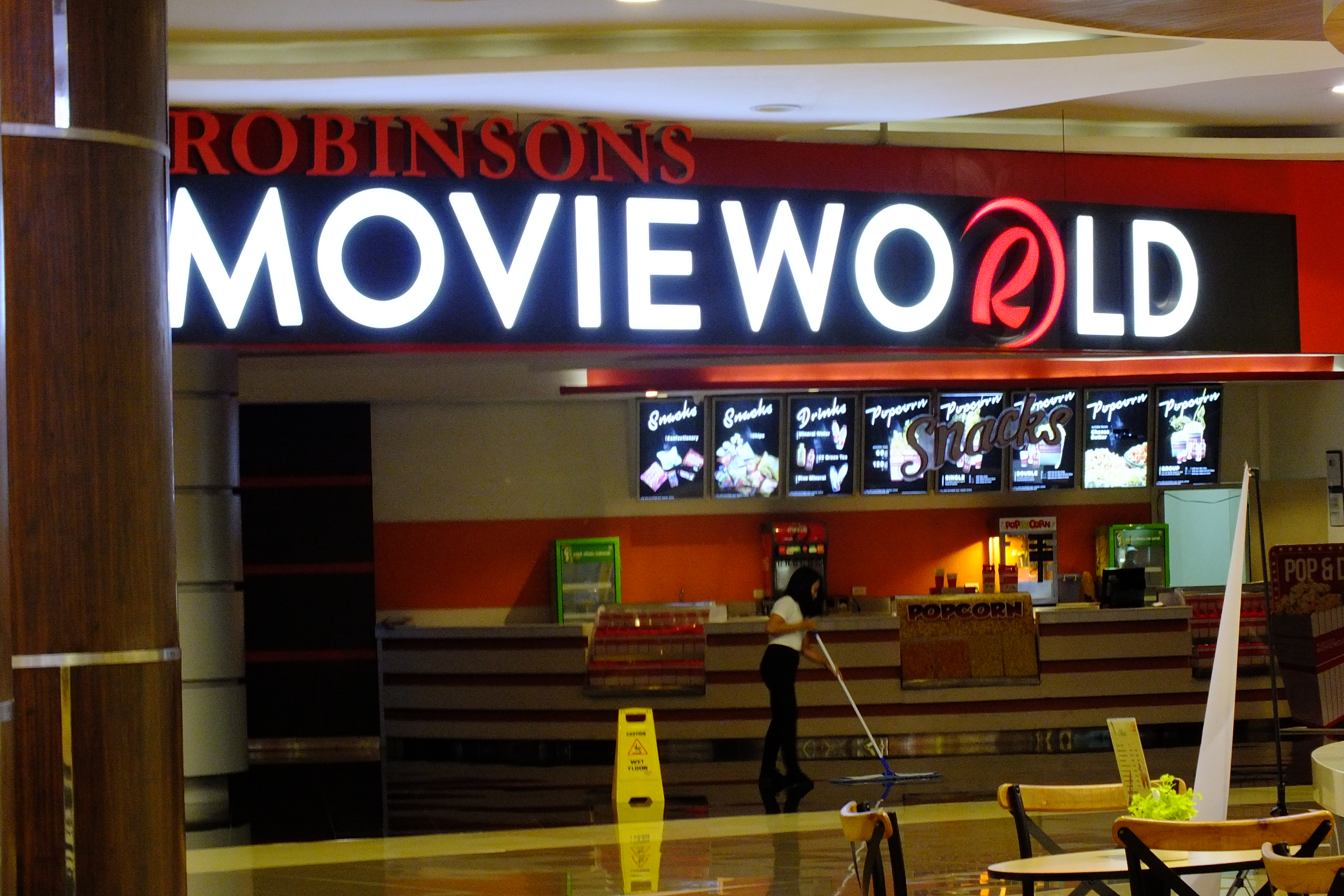
Robinsons Movieworld

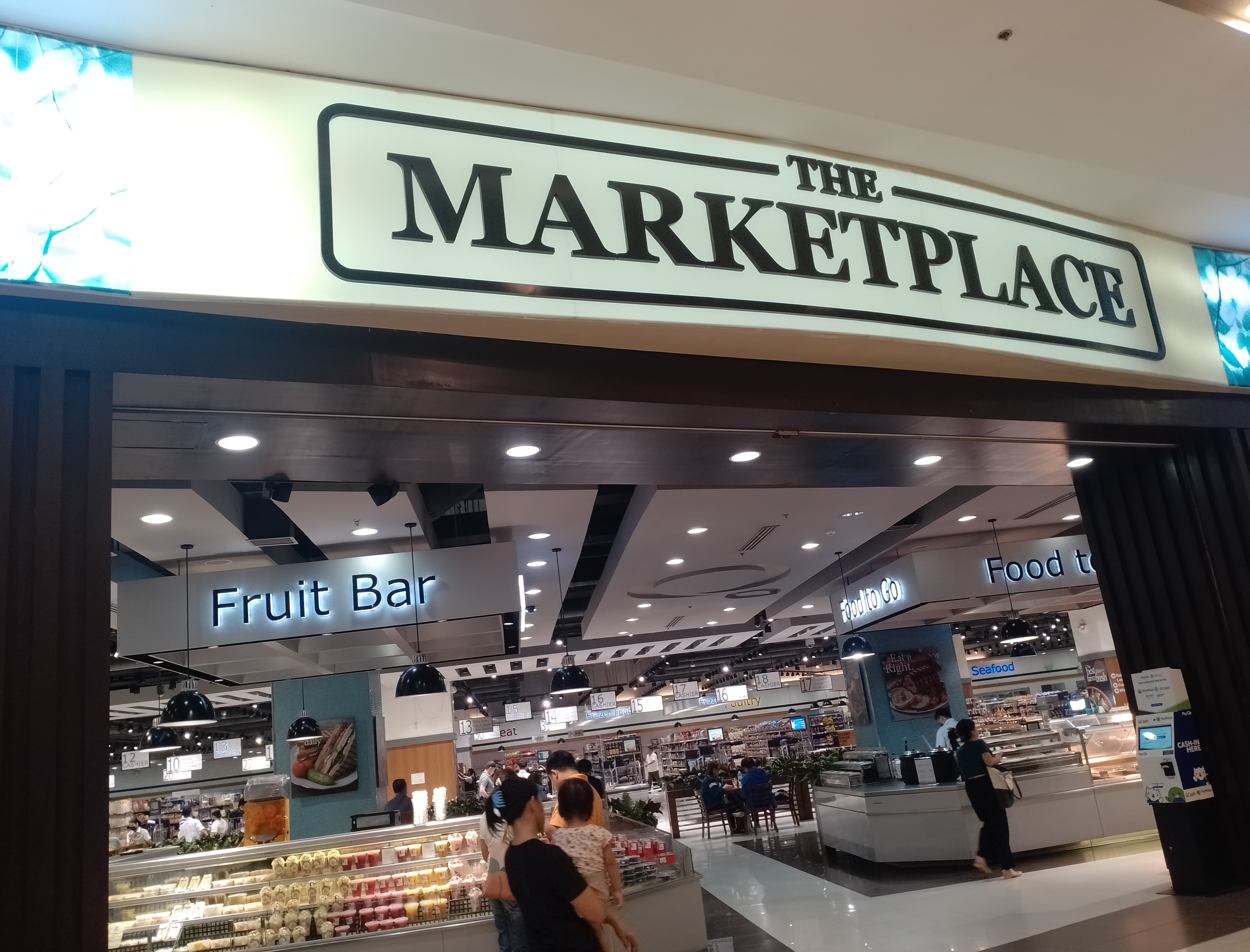
The Marketplace

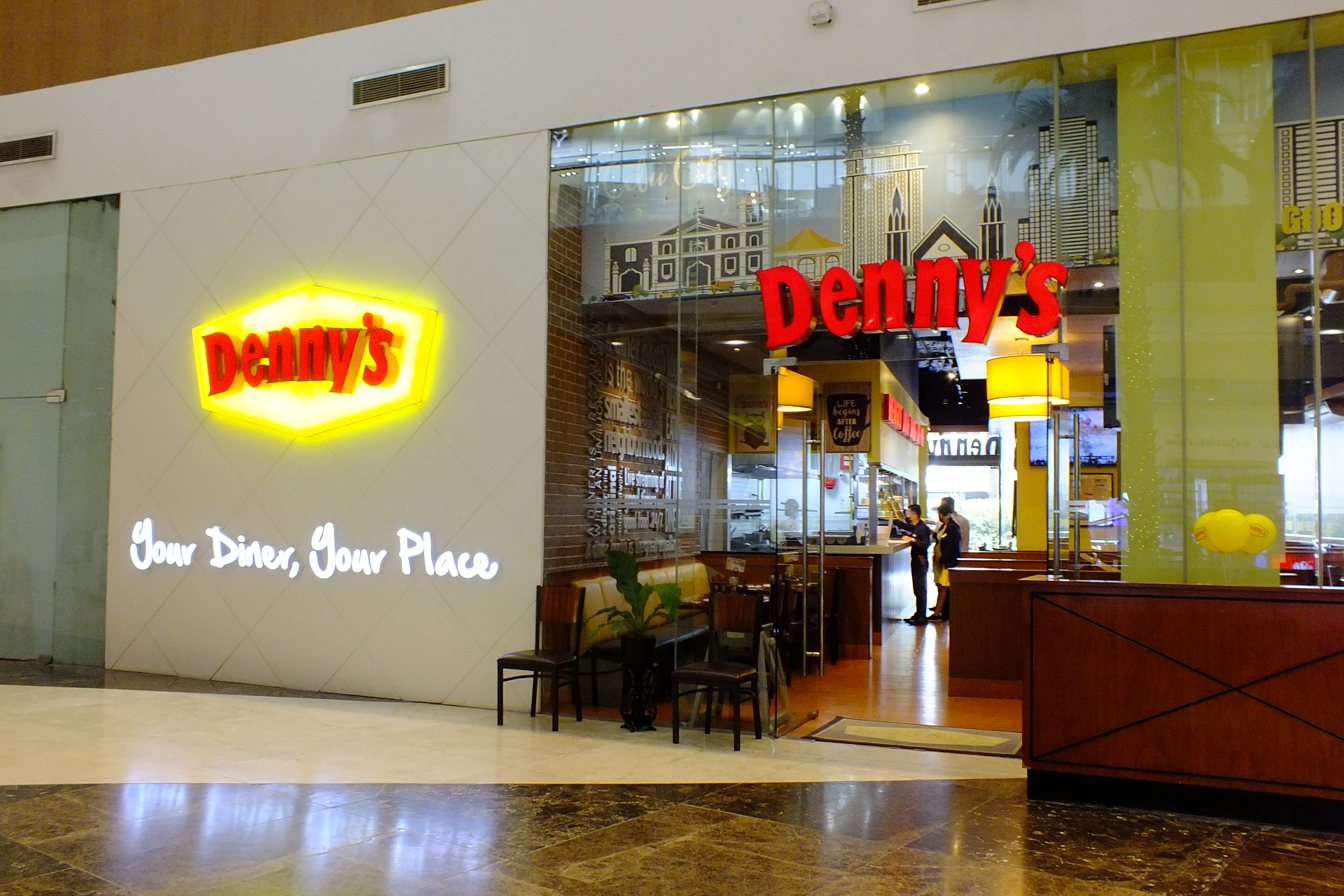
Denny's

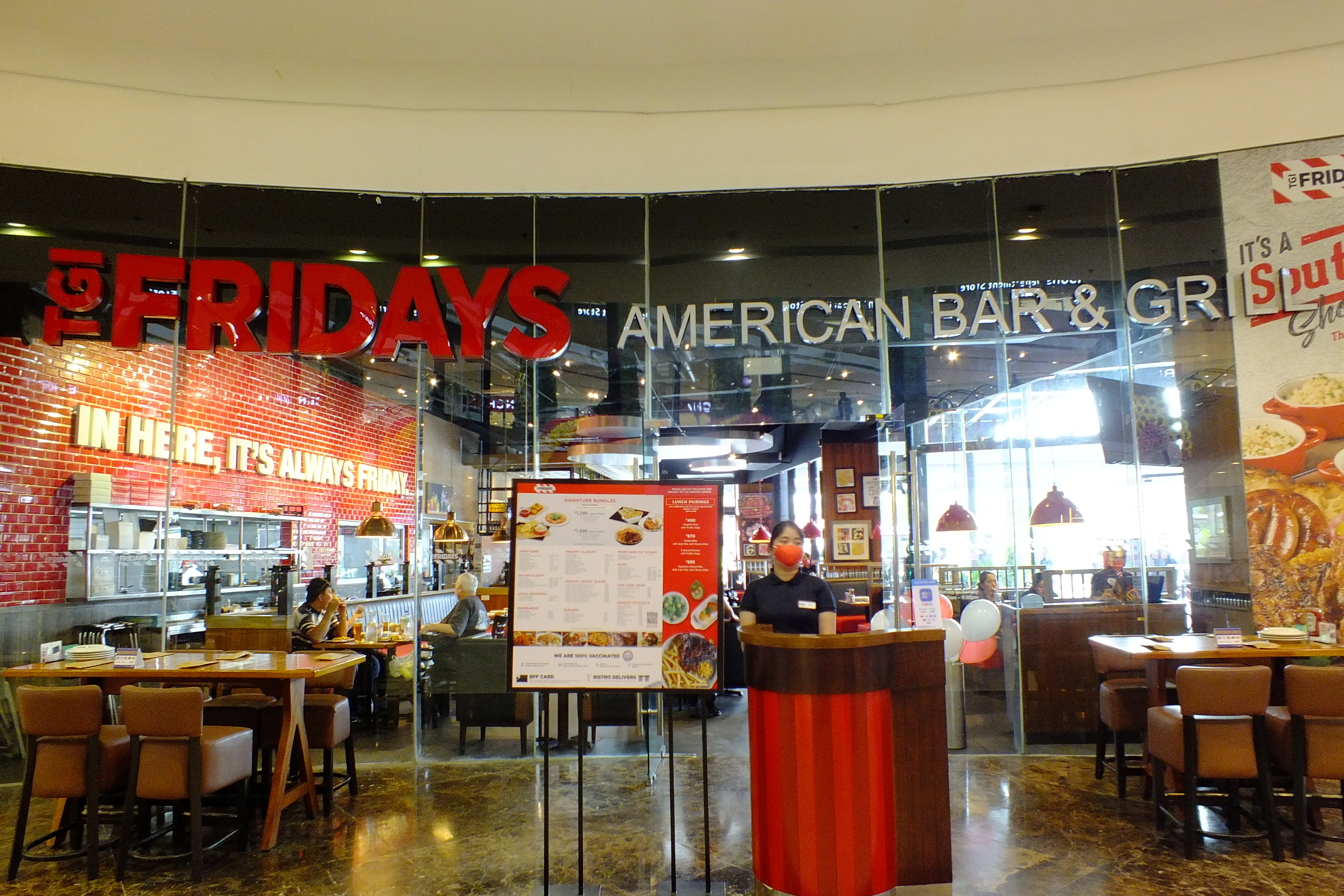
TGI Fridays

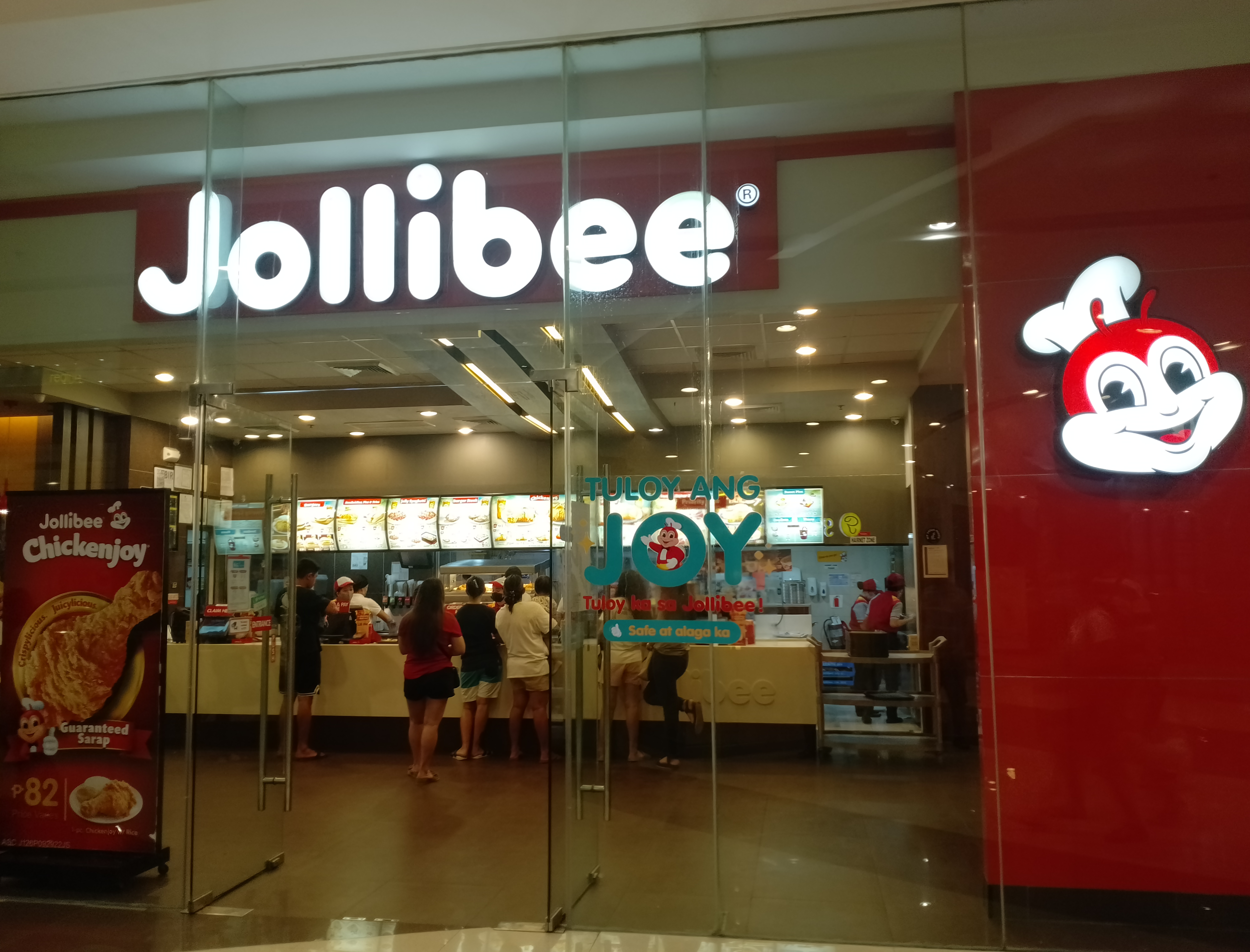
Jollibee

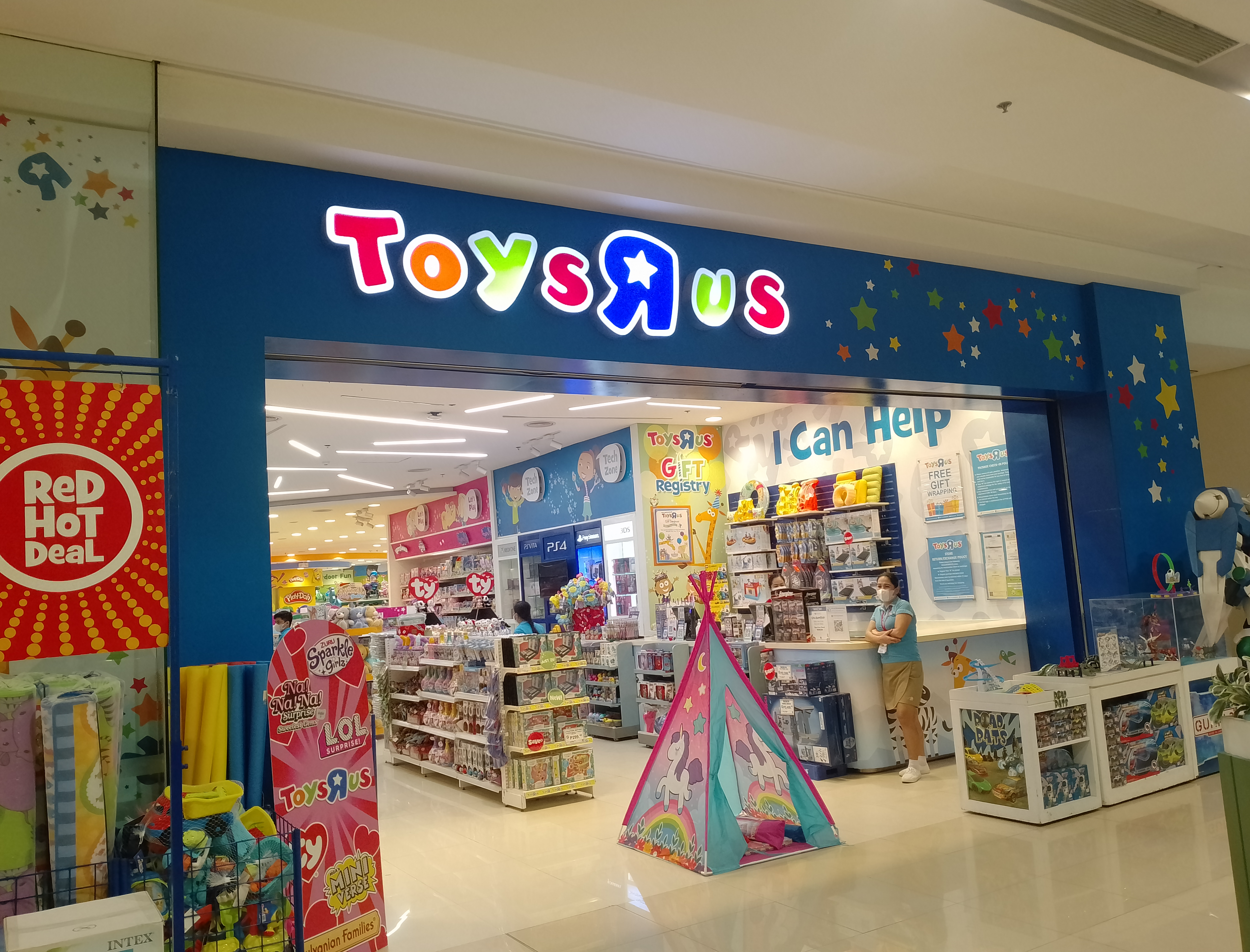
Toys "R" Us

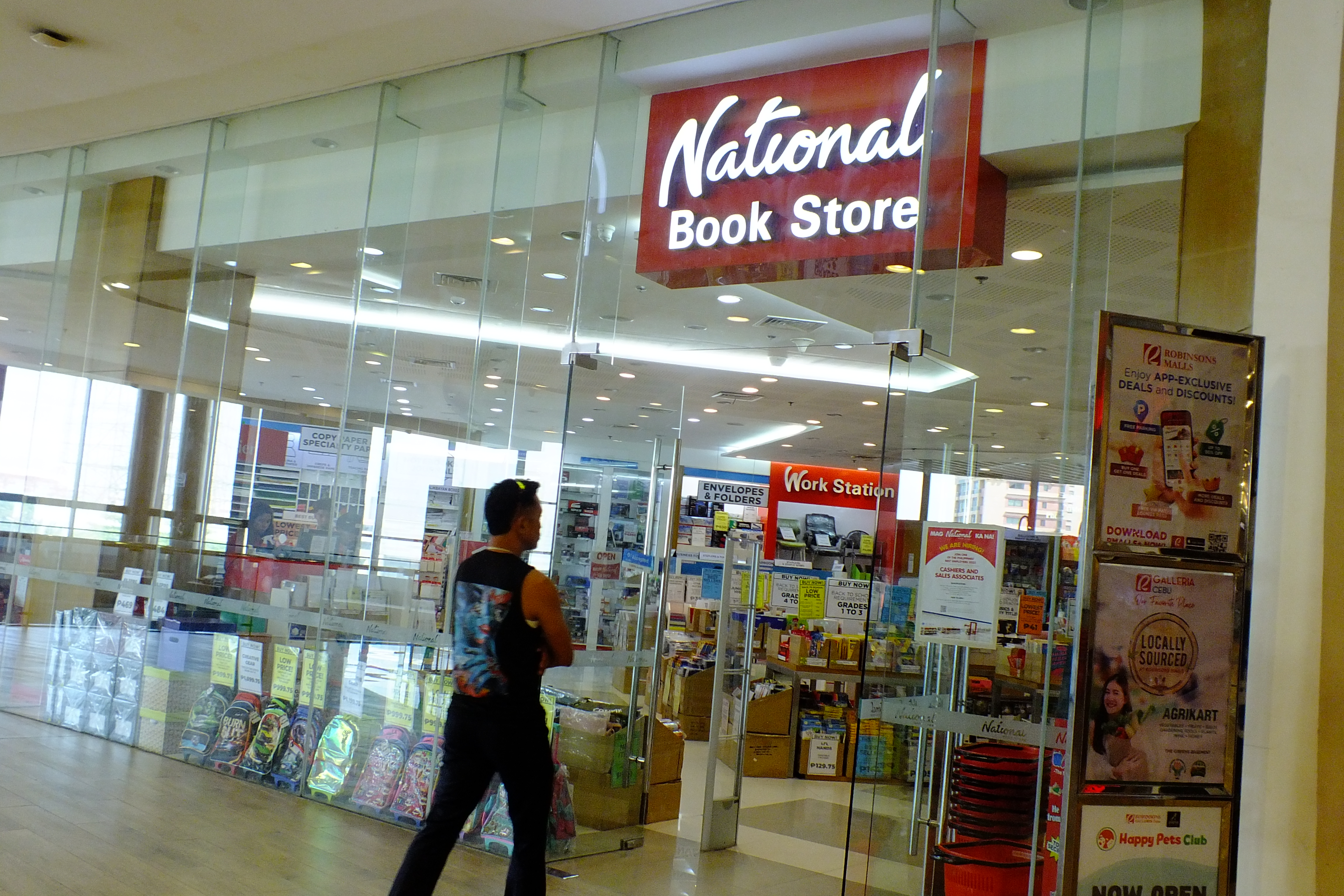
National Book Store

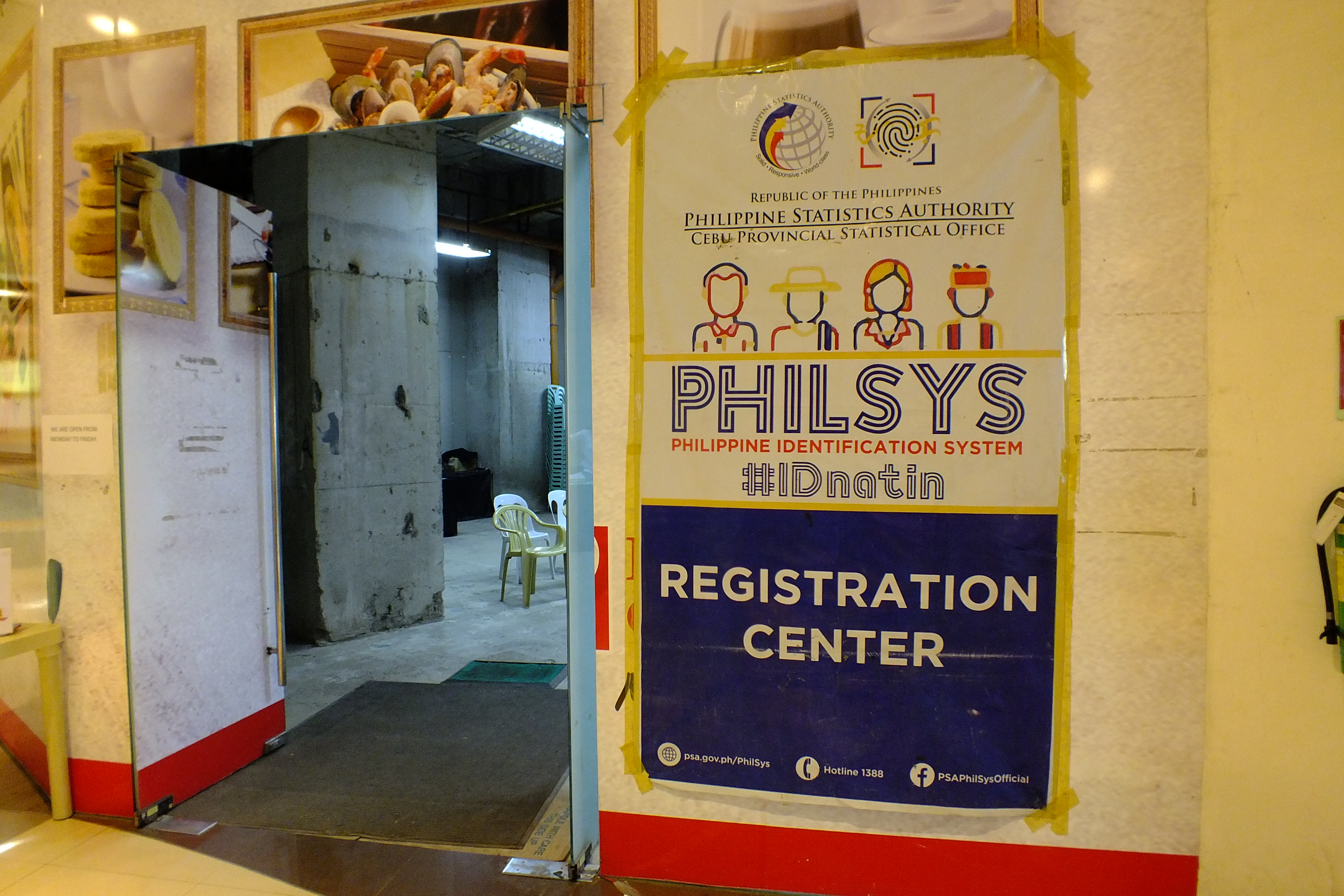
Philsys Identification System
