= Digitel Wireless =

US wireless internet service provider

Digitel Wireless is a wireless broadband integrator associated with primarily rural and agricultural projects in the Southeastern United States. It is best known for involvement in public and private funded projects that have compound results such as Internet access, research data collection, and water conservation. The core team within Digitel Wireless are from what was once Camvera Networks (previously Tri-State Broadband). Companies like Digitel Wireless are often associated with municipal wireless network projects.

The broadband systems involved are typically found in non-served and under-served rural and "fringe" urban markets. These are the markets commonly associated with broadband Internet access where a wireless Internet service provider does not already exist. A common method to fund the creation of these broadband companies is to make use of Rural Utilities Service funding and most recently, broadband stimulus provisions.

Digitel Wireless is a division of Digitel Corporation.
