= Robinsons Cabanatuan =

Shopping mall in Nueva Ecija, Philippines

Robinsons Townville Cabanatuan (Robinsons Cabanatuan)
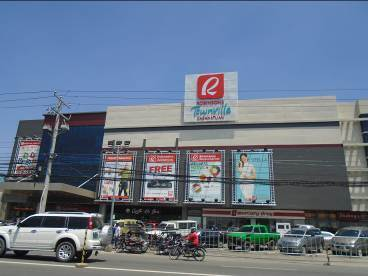
- Location: Cabanatuan, Nueva Ecija, Philippines
- Coordinates: 15°27′36″N 120°57′00″E
- Address: beside NE Pacific Mall KM111, Brgy. H.Concepcion Sr., Maharlika Highway
- Opened: Soft opening: November 10, 2008; 17 years ago; Grand opening: February 4, 2009; 17 years ago
- Developer: Robinsons Land Corporation
- Manager: Robinsons Malls (Robinsons Retail Holdings, Inc.)
- Owner: John Gokongwei
- Num. of stores: 100 shops and restaurants
- Num. of anchor tenants: 6
- Floor area: 18,000 m^{2} (190,000 ft^{2})
- Parking: 500+ cars (with NE Pacific Mall)
- Website: www.robinsonsmalls.com

Robinsons Townville Cabanatuan (referenced as Robinsons Cabanatuan as listed on the text-only annual reports for Robinsons Land (known as SEC 17-A), is a shopping mall located along Maharlika Highway in Cabanatuan, Philippines.

The mall is owned by John Gokongwei, founder of JG Summit Holdings and Robinsons Land Co, and is operated by Robinsons Retail Holdings, Inc.

== History ==
Robinsons Cabanatuan was built on a lot beside NE Pacific Mall in 2007, making it the first Robinsons mall in Nueva Ecija. The mall had its soft opening in November 2008 and its grand opening the next year.

Although the mall was owned by Robinsons Land Corporation (the parent of Robinsons Malls), it was operated by Robinsons Retail Holdings, Inc. (whose parent company of several in-house retail stores for each Robinsons Malls such as Robinsons Supermarket, Robinsons Department Store, Robinsons Appliances, Toys-R-Us, and among others). It was their first community mall that they operated. Thus, the mall was not listed on Robinsons Malls' website (as well as its own mobile app for handheld devices) though yet determined is still part of Robinsons Land's chain of malls (referenced on both companies' text-only annual reports and mall chain-wide promos).

Later, the mall was rebranded as Robinsons Townville Cabanatuan, referring the RRHI's (the mall's operator) own community mall-formatted that it was sister counterpart of Robinsons Malls.

There have been talks to expand the mall, but no timetable has been reached.

== Features ==
Robinsons Townville Cabanatuan is one of the most visited malls in the city and in the province.

The mall is a three-storey building which is mainly occupied by Robinsons Department Store on both 2nd and 3rd floors, Robinsons Appliances and Handyman Do-It Best Hardware is located on the 2nd floor while Robinsons Supermarket is located in the 1st floor.

The mall attracts a daily foot traffic of over 100,000 people, which increases during weekends thanks to its direct connection with NE Pacific Mall. The mall also shares profits with the much larger NE Pacific Mall, which is a property of the NE Group of Companies and Landco Pacific Corporation.

== See also ==
- SM City Cabanatuan
- NE Pacific Mall
