= Sun Cellular =

Telecommunications company in the Philippines

Digitel Mobile Philippines, Inc. Sun Cellular
- Company type: Subsidiary
- Industry: Telecommunications
- Founded: February 22, 2003; 23 years ago
- Defunct: April 25, 2022; 4 years ago
- Fate: Absorbed into Smart Communications
- Successor: Smart Communications
- Headquarters: Quezon City, Philippines
- Area served: Philippines
- Key people: Manuel V. Pangilinan, Chairman; Orlando B Vea, President and CEO
- Products: Voice; SMS; MMS; Broadband services Value Added Services
- Owner: JG Summit Holdings (2003–2011); PLDT (2011–2022)
- Parent: Digital Telecommunications Philippines; Smart Communications
- Website: suncellular.com.ph (now redirects to Smart Communications corporate website) web.archive.org/web/20120731020838/http://suncellular.com.ph/ (archived website from July 31, 2012)

Digitel Mobile Philippines, Inc., doing business as Sun Cellular (or simply known as Sun), was a wholly owned subsidiary of Digital Telecommunications Philippines (Digitel), which in turn was owned by PLDT and is one of the Philippines' largest mobile telecommunications companies. It was established by Digitel in September 2001 to provide wireless public and private telecommunications services. Sun Cellular was known for introducing unlimited call and text services in the Philippines.

== History ==
=== Early history ===
On August 7, 2000, Digitel was granted a permit by the NTC to establish and operate a Nationwide Cellular Mobile Telephone System (CMTS) using Global System for Mobile Communications (GSM) and/or Code Division Multiple Access (CDMA) technology. The following month, the company founded the Digitel Mobile Philippines, Inc. (DMPI) to assist in its wireless service.

On December 11, 2002, the government granted DMPI, through Republic Act No. 9180, the right to establish a permanent franchise to create and manage a wireless telecommunications service. DMPI launched its wireless service, known as Sun Cellular, on March 3, 2003. From mobile telephony, Sun Cellular expanded its services to voice, messaging and international roaming services, to wireless broadband and value-added services for consumers and businesses.

=== Acquisition by PLDT ===
In 2011, PLDT acquired Digitel, including Sun Cellular, from JG Summit Holdings. Although PLDT also owns Sun's former competitor Smart Communications, the two networks initially remained separate entities with completely independent mobile network infrastructure and corporate management structures.

Prepaid logo used from February to October 2020.

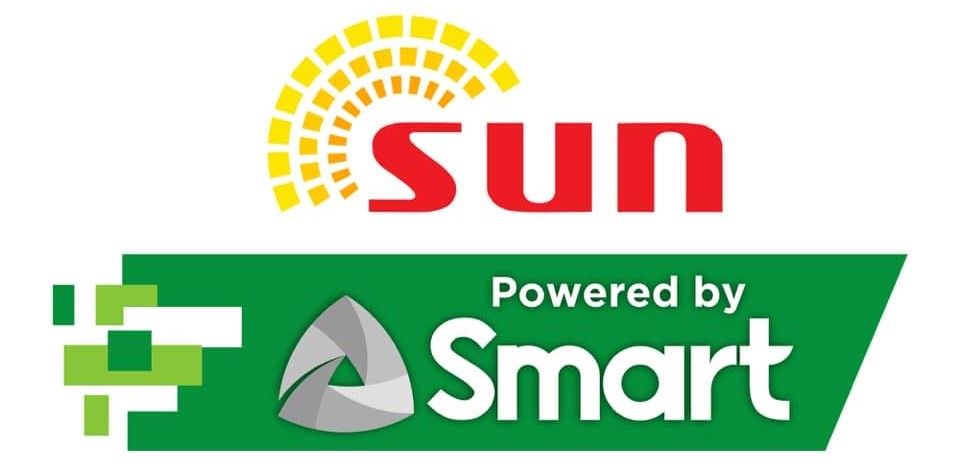
Postpaid logo used until April 2022

On October 21, 2020, PLDT announced that Sun's prepaid service was integrated into Smart Prepaid, leaving its postpaid service under "Sun" branding.

On April 25, 2022, Sun's postpaid service was merged with Smart Postpaid, resulting to the cessation of all Sun Postpaid plan and add-on offerings. Smart encouraged those planning to subscribe to Sun to instead take advantage of Smart Signature plans, while existing subscribers can either still use their current subscription plans or upgrade to Smart Signature.

== Awards ==
- Most Promising Telecom Service Provider in Asia Pacific award in the 2009 Frost & Sullivan ICT Award in Singapore.
- The 2005 Silver Prize for Most Effective New Service Introduction and Top 25 Philippine Companies recognized by Business Mirror and Stern Steward & Co.
- In 2011, Sun Cellular won the Philippines Mobile Service Provider of the Year from the Frost & Sullivan Asia Pacific Best Practices Awards in Singapore.
