= NE Pacific Mall =

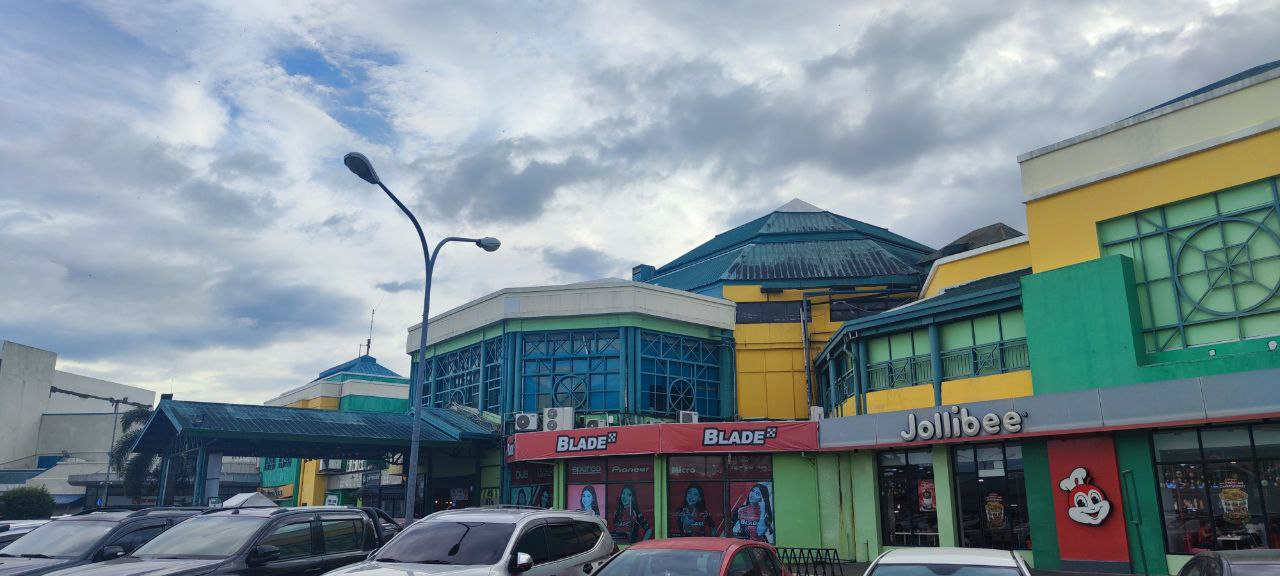
- NE Pacific Mall in 2024
- Location: Cabanatuan, Nueva Ecija, Philippines
- Coordinates: 15.4619°N 120.9506°E
- Address: KM111, Brgy. H. Concepcion Sr., Maharlika Highway
- Opened: April 1996
- Developer: Landco Pacific Corporation
- Manager: NE Pacific Shopping Centers Corporation
- Owner: Lucio Co
- Num. of stores: Over 400 shops and restaurants
- Num. of anchor tenants: 25
- Floor area: 41,750 m^{2} (449,400 ft^{2})
- Floors: 2
- Parking: 500+ cars

NE Pacific Mall (Nueva Ecija Pacific Mall) is a shopping mall located along Maharlika Highway in Brgy. Hermogenes Concepcion, Cabanatuan, Nueva Ecija, Philippines.

== History ==
NE Pacific Mall opened in Cabanatuan, Nueva Ecija in April 1996. It was primarily developed by Landco Pacific Corporation, and managed by the NE Group of Companies, which developed the Lakewood City Golf Course and Residential Complex and NE Mall both located in the city. Over time, the mall expanded and improved on its features.

In March 2014, Cosco Capital Inc. led by Puregold owner Lucio Co eventually acquired NE Pacific Mall in an effort to expand their presence in Nueva Ecija. It is the only Pacific Mall that was not sold to the Metro Gaisano group.

== Features ==
NE Pacific Mall features more than 400 tenants, shops, and restaurants. Throughout its existence, the mall has served as one of the primary shopping centers of Cabanatuan and the entire province of Nueva Ecija. It also has a direct link with Robinsons Cabanatuan, allowing both malls to closely share the amount of foot traffic in a day.

The mall primarily anchors NE Bakeshop and Restaurant and Puregold Supermarket.

It has many local and international store brands and food restaurants, including McDonalds and KFC; and Filipino fast food chains, Jollibee, Chowking, Mang Inasal, Goldilocks, and S&R New York Style Pizza.

Government agencies have also established their offices within the mall such as PhilHealth, Social Security System (SSS), and Philippine Statistics Authority (PSA).

In terms of entertainment, the mall features three cinemas, which includes a large format theater capable for 3D movies and events. It also contains World of Fun, one of the famous family entertainment and arcade centers in the country.

== Gallery ==
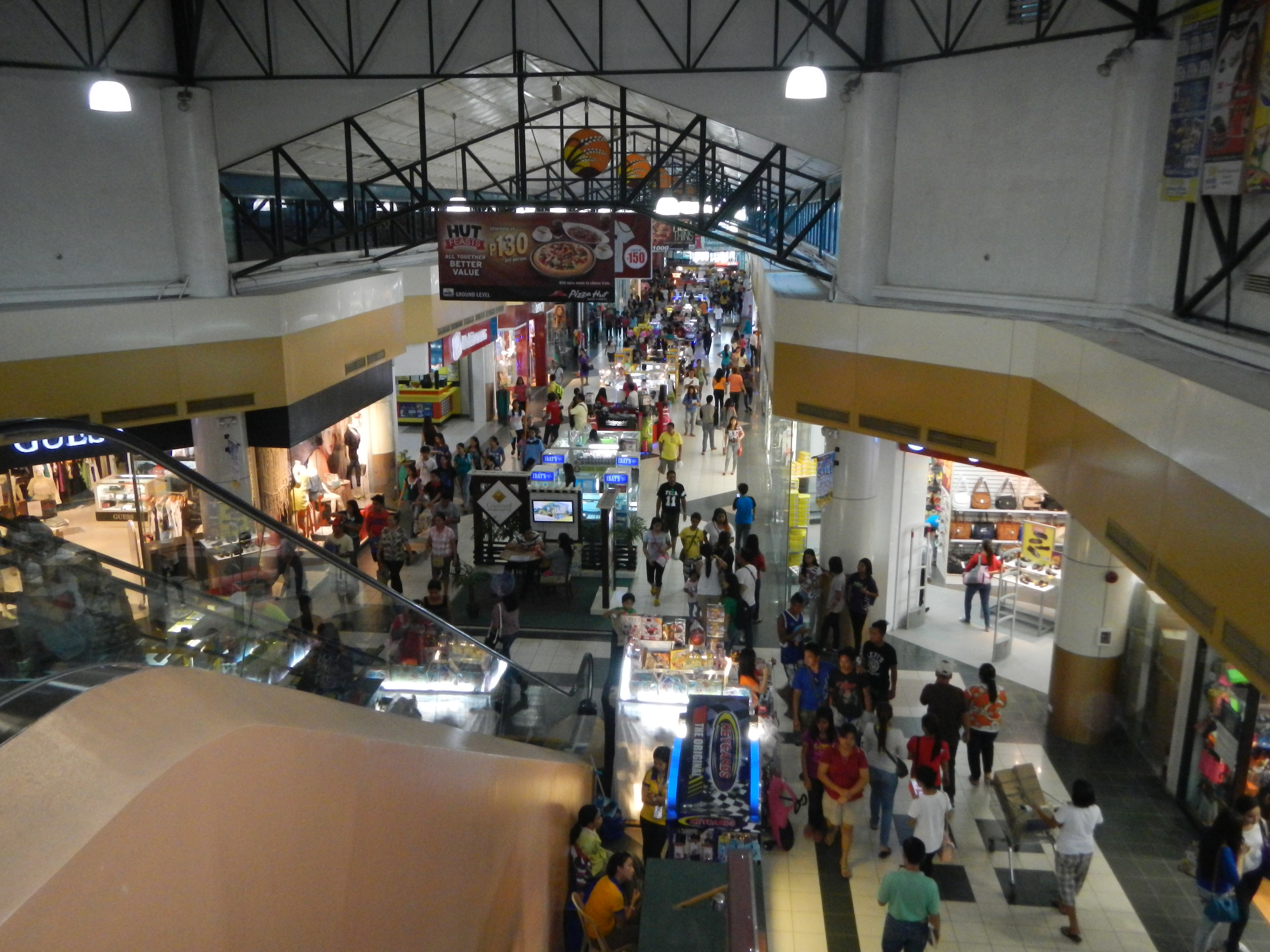
Main Pavilion

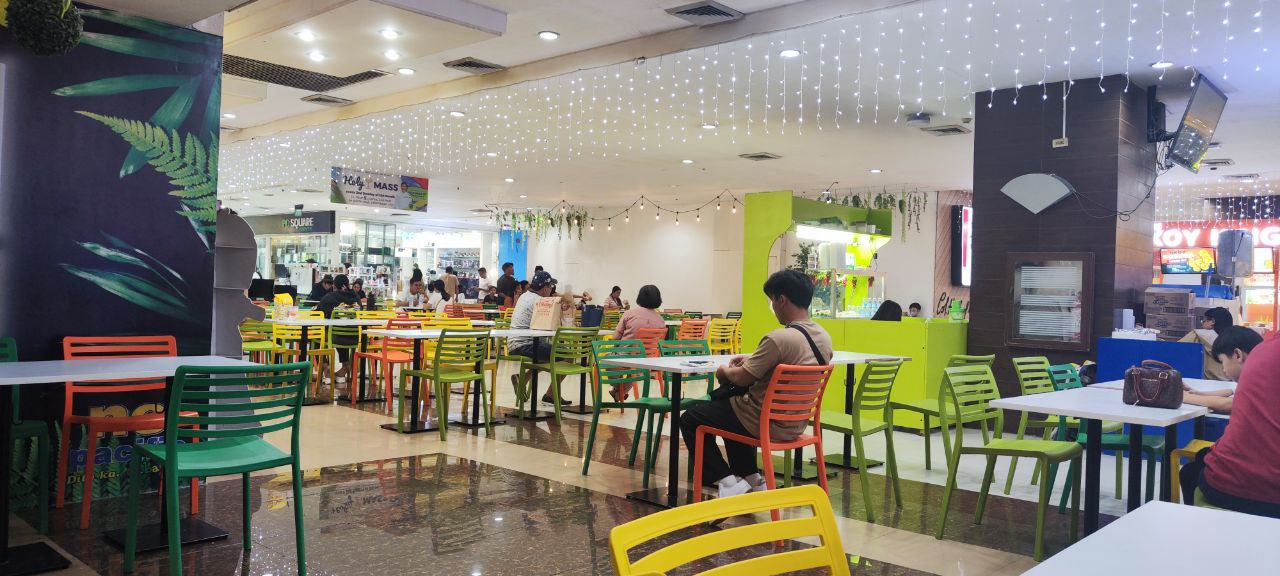
Food Court

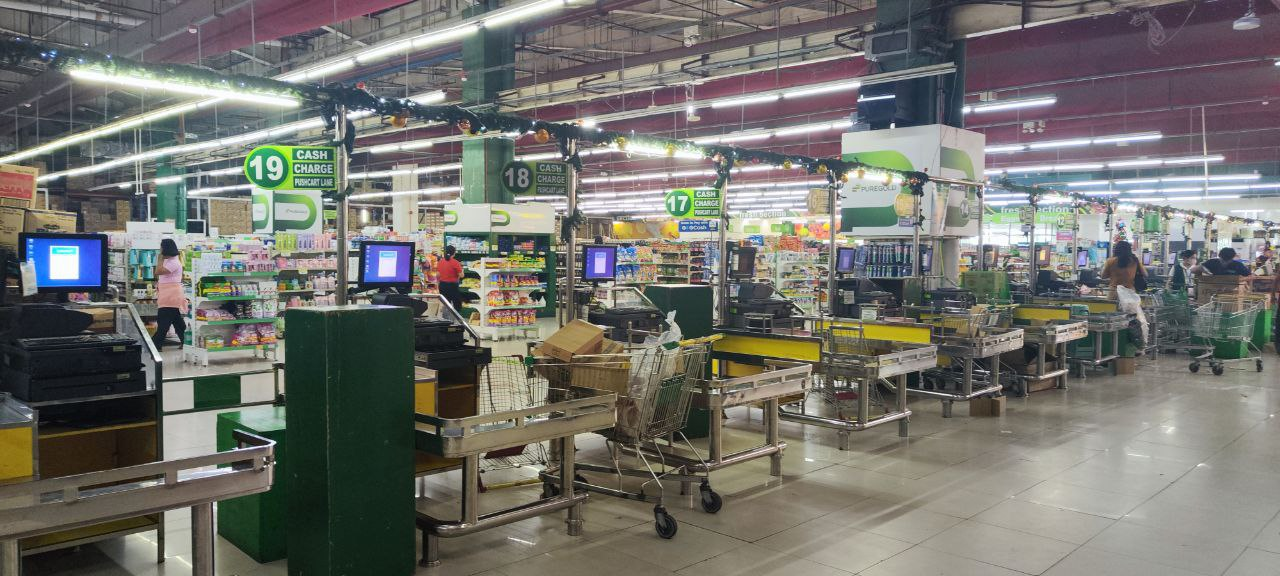
Puregold Supermarket
