= Go Hotels =

Filipino hotel chain

- Product type: Hotel chain
- Current owner: Robinsons Land Corporation
- Country: Philippines
- Introduced: May 19, 2010
- Markets: Philippines
- Tagline: "A Place for Every Juan"
- Website: www.gohotels.ph

Go Hotels is a Philippine chain of budget hotels owned and operated by Robinsons Land Corporation, a subsidiary of JG Summit Holdings conglomerate of Filipino-Chinese entrepreneur John Gokongwei Jr. As of January 2021, the company has 17 hotels, all located in the Philippines.

== History ==
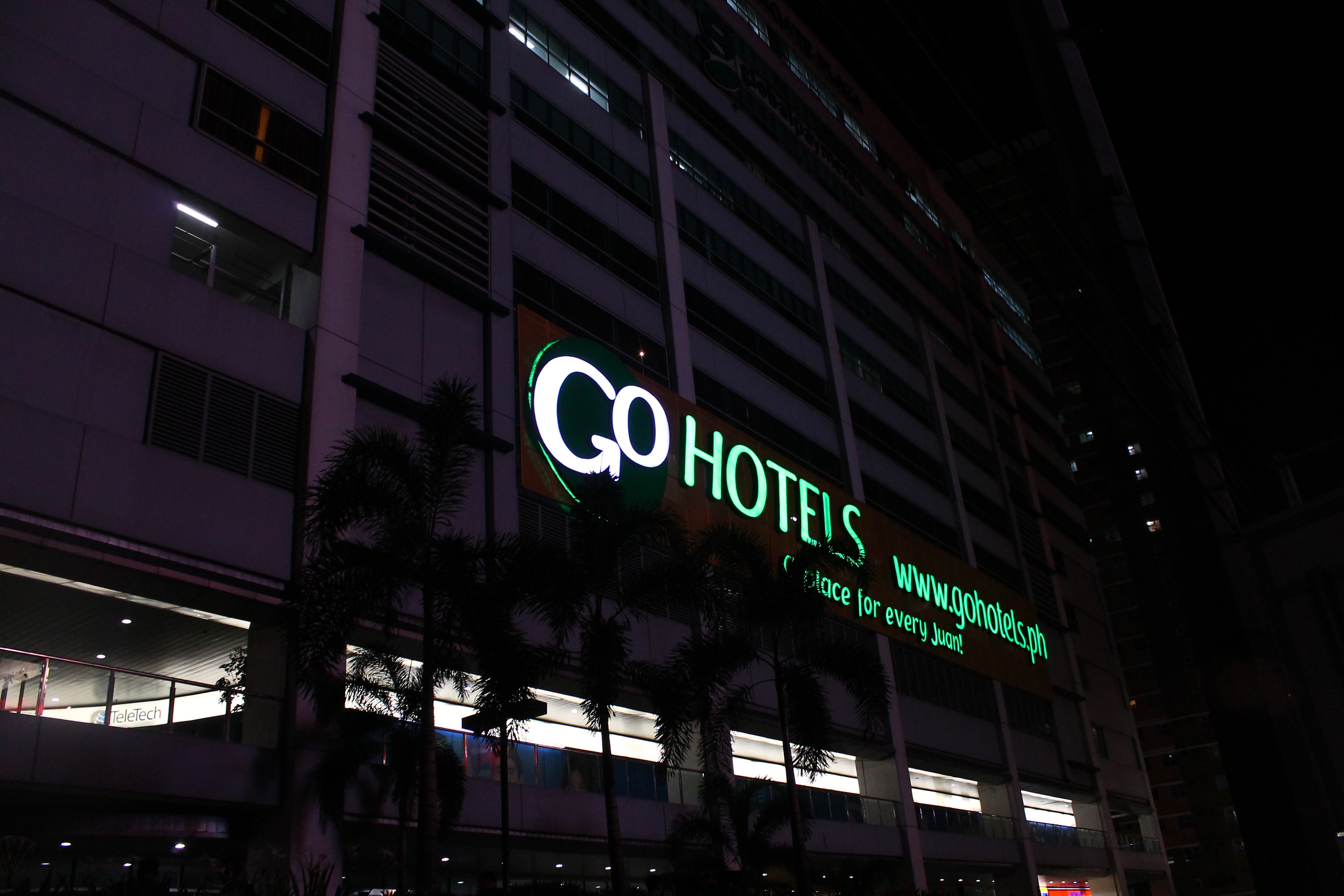
The first Go Hotel along EDSA in Mandaluyong, Metro Manila.

Robinsons Land Corporation, the real estate arm of Filipino-Chinese businessman John Gokongwei Jr.'s JG Summit Holdings, first entered the hospitality business in 2004 with the establishment of Robinsons Hotels and Resorts, which manages several luxury hotel brands such as the Crowne Plaza Galleria, Holiday Inn Galleria, Dusit Thani Mactan Cebu, and The Westin Sonata Place Ortigas. A second hotel brand, Summit Hotels and Resorts, was established in 2009 with the opening of Summit Ridge Tagaytay in Tagaytay, Cavite, which caters to the middle income market. The following year, RLC established the Go Hotels brand to take advantage of the growing budget hotel market and offered a "no frills" hotel experience to clients. Most Go Hotels branches are located beside or near a branch of Robinsons Malls, which is the retail arm of JG Summit Holdings. It also offers rooms bundled with flights being offered by airline company Cebu Pacific, another subsidiary of JG Summit Holdings.

The first Go Hotel opened on May 19, 2010, along EDSA in Mandaluyong, Metro Manila with 223 rooms and located beside Forum Robinsons, one of Robinsons Malls shopping malls. This was followed two years later with the opening of four Go Hotel branches in Puerto Princesa, Dumaguete, Tacloban and Bacolod. In 2013, the company opened two Go Hotels: the 118-room Go Hotels Otis in Paco, Manila and the 167-room Go Hotels Iloilo in Iloilo City. That same year, RLC started offering franchises to potential investors to speed up the expansion of the brand, with the joint venture of Roxaco Land and Singapore-based Vanguard Hotels Pte. Ltd. as the first franchisee.

In 2014, RLC open additional two Go Hotels branches: the 198-room Go Hotels Ortigas in Ortigas Center, Pasig, Metro Manila and the 104-room Go Hotels in Butuan, Agusan del Norte. A further three Go Hotels were launched in 2016: the 183-room Go Hotels Lanang in Davao City (a joint venture with Udenna Development Corporation), the 167-room Go Hotels North EDSA in Quezon City, and the 199-room Go Hotels Manila Airport near Ninoy Aquino International Airport in Parañaque. The company opened another three Go Hotels in 2017: Go Hotels Cubao and Go Hotels Timog Avenue in Quezon City; and Go Hotels Ermita in Manila. In December 2018, Go Hotels opened its third branch in Mindanao, the 100-room Go Hotels Iligan in Iligan, Lanao del Norte.

In 2020, Go Hotels, along with its sister hotel brand, Summit Hotels and Resorts, announced that it will convert some of its rooms in selected hotel branches into rental office space due to the low demand for accommodations and travel brought about by the COVID-19 pandemic in the Philippines.

== Loyalty program ==
In June 2016, Go Hotels, along with Summit Hotels and Resorts, launched a loyalty program wherein Robinsons Rewards cardholders can earn points for every PH₱400 spent on accommodations and add-on purchases, such as food and beverage, spa and other services availed at the hotel.

== Upcoming hotels ==
Go Hotels is planning to open additional hotels in Naga, Camarines Sur and Tuguegarao, Cagayan.

== Restrictions ==
Go Hotels will show as having no rooms available if more than 1 child is entered into the search/dates available box. This is current for Go Hotel in Tuguegarao, Cagayan. Unable to verify if this is hotel policy as staff refuse to answer any queries, whether via phone or email.

== See also ==
- Summit Hotels and Resorts
- Robinsons Malls
- Cebu Pacific
