= Robinsons Malls =

Shopping mall chain in the Philippines

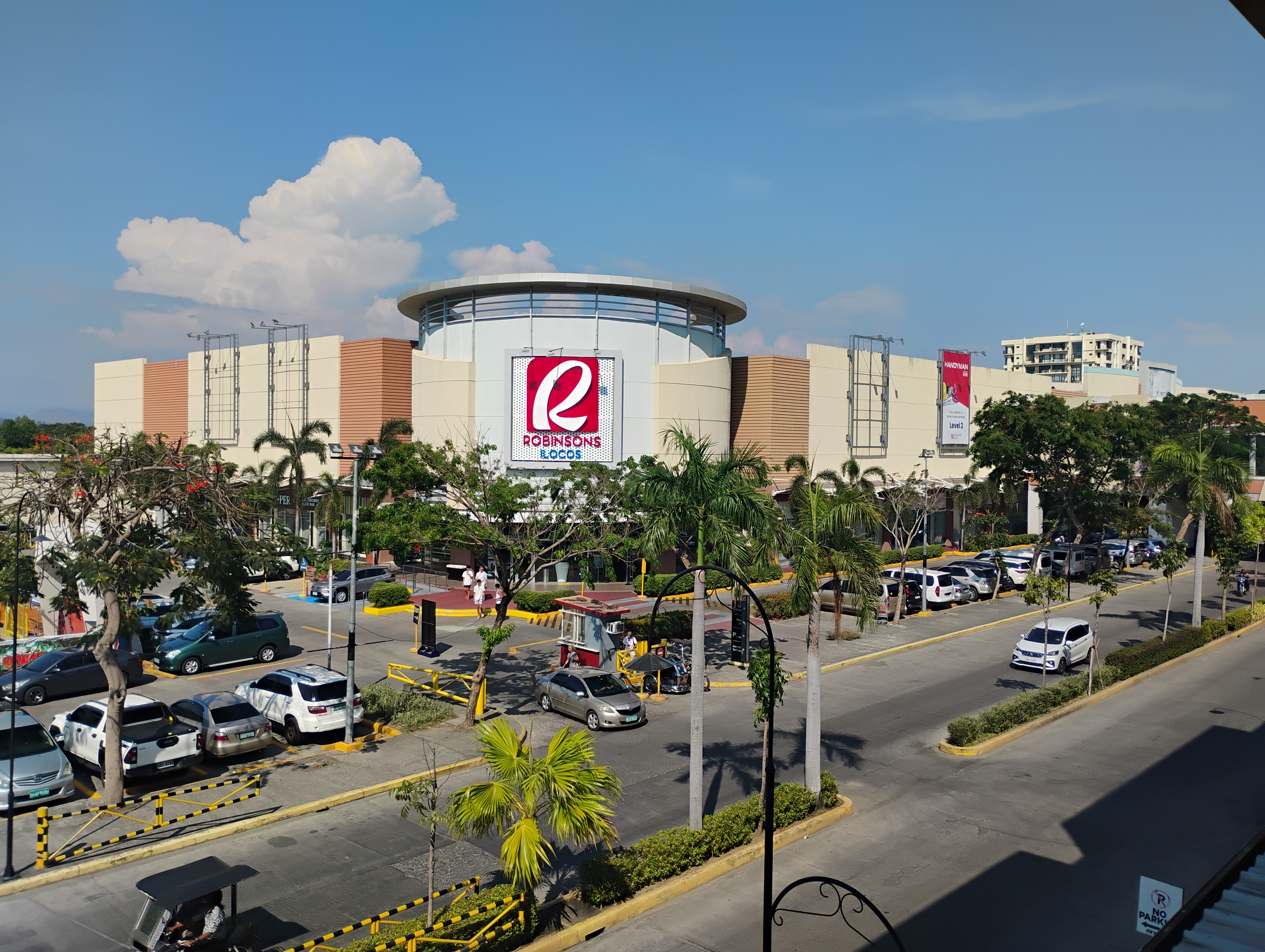
- Robinsons mall in Ilocos Norte
- Type: Subsidiary
- Industry: Shopping mall chain
- Founded: September 9, 1997; 28 years ago
- Headquarters: Galleria Corporate Center, EDSA corner Ortigas Avenue, Quezon City
- Number of locations: 60 (as of April 2025)
- Area served: Philippines; China
- Key people: Lance Y. Gokongwei (Chairman); Mybelle V. Aragon-GoBio (President & CEO); Faraday D. Go (EVP and Business Unit General Manager)
- Parent: Robinsons Land Corporation
- Website: robinsonsmalls.com

Robinsons Malls is one of the largest shopping malls and retail operators in the Philippines. It was incorporated on September 9, 1997, by entrepreneur John Gokongwei Jr. to develop, conduct, operate and maintain the Robinsons commercial shopping centers and all related businesses, such as the lease of commercial spaces within the compounds of shopping centers.

Robinsons Malls also has its branches in China under the Robinsons Galleria name.

In March 2023, John Gokongwei Jr.'s son Lance took over the leadership of Robinsons Malls.

== Malls ==
=== Philippines ===
The list of Robinsons Malls is based on their official website in order of their development.

#	Branch Name	Image	Opening Date	Location
1	Robinsons Galleria		January 12, 1990	Ortigas Center, Quezon City
2	Robinsons Fuente		October 15, 1990 (as a department store); 2000 (as a mall)	Fuente Osmeña Ave., Cebu City
3	Robinsons Manila		1980 (as a department store); 1997 (as a mall)	Ermita, Manila
4	Robinsons Bacolod		1997	Bacolod
5	Robinsons Imus		1998	Imus, Cavite
6	Robinsons Metro East		August 31, 2001	Pasig (Note: A 2021 court decision settled the Cainta-Pasig boundary dispute in Cainta's favor, thus putting Robinsons Metro East under the jurisdiction of Barangay San Isidro. However, despite the court decision, the mall still considers itself to be part of Barangay Dela Paz in Pasig.)
7	Robinsons Iloilo		October 5, 2001	Iloilo City
8	Robinsons Novaliches		October 12, 2001	Novaliches, Quezon City
9	Robinsons Starmills		2001	San Fernando, Pampanga
10	Robinsons Los Baños		2001	Los Baños, Laguna
11	Robinsons Sta. Rosa		December 10, 2002	Santa Rosa, Laguna
12	Robinsons Cagayan de Oro		December 10, 2002	Limketkai Center, Cagayan de Oro
13	Robinsons Dasmariñas		February 2003	Dasmariñas, Cavite
14	Robinsons Lipa		August 2003	Lipa, Batangas
15	Robinsons Cainta		November 21, 2003	Cainta, Rizal
16	Robinsons Angeles		March 2004	Angeles City
17	Robinsons Cybergate Bacolod		May 2004	Bacolod
18	Forum Robinsons		Opened: November 17, 2004; Closed: April 30, 2022	Mandaluyong
19	Robinsons Otis		September 2007	Paco, Manila
20	Robinsons Luisita		October 2008	Hacienda Luisita, Tarlac City, Tarlac
22	Robinsons Cybergate Davao		May 8, 2009	Davao City
23	Robinsons Tacloban		June 11, 2009	Tacloban, Leyte
24	Robinsons GenSan		October 5, 2009	General Santos
25	Robinsons Dumaguete		November 23, 2009	Dumaguete, Negros Oriental
26	Robinsons Cybergate Cebu		December 9, 2009	Capitol Site, Cebu City
27	Robinsons Ilocos		December 14, 2009	Nangalisan East, Laoag City, and San Francisco, San Nicolas, Ilocos Norte
28	Robinsons Tagaytay		2010	Tagaytay, Cavite
29	Robinsons Pangasinan		March 15, 2012	Calasiao, Pangasinan
30	Robinsons Palawan		May 24, 2012	Puerto Princesa
31	Robinsons Magnolia		August 13, 2012	New Manila, Quezon City
32	Robinsons Butuan		November 25, 2013	Butuan
33	Robinsons Malabon		December 4, 2013	Malabon
34	Robinsons Malolos		December 12, 2013	Sumapang Matanda, Malolos, Bulacan
35	Robinsons Roxas		February 13, 2014	Roxas City, Capiz
36	Robinsons Santiago		February 19, 2014	Santiago, Isabela
37	Robinsons Antipolo		September 26, 2014 Grand opening: November 15, 2014	Antipolo, Rizal
38	Robinsons Las Piñas		October 25, 2014	Las Piñas
39	Robinsons Antique		July 15, 2015	San Jose de Buenavista, Antique
40	Robinsons Galleria Cebu		December 10, 2015	Tejero, Cebu City
41	Robinsons GenTrias		May 26, 2016	General Trias, Cavite
42	Robinsons Jaro		September 8, 2016	Jaro, Iloilo City
43	Robinsons Tagum		December 6, 2016	Tagum, Davao del Norte
44	Robinsons Iligan		July 26, 2017	Iligan, Lanao del Norte
45	Robinsons Naga		August 15, 2017	Naga, Camarines Sur
46	Robinsons North Tacloban		December 14, 2017	Tacloban, Leyte
47	Robinsons Ormoc		April 19, 2018	Ormoc, Leyte
48	Robinsons Pavia		June 21, 2018	Pavia, Iloilo
49	Robinsons Tuguegarao		July 26, 2018	Tuguegarao, Cagayan
50	Robinsons Valencia		December 12, 2018	Valencia, Bukidnon
51	Robinsons Galleria South		July 19, 2019	San Pedro, Laguna
52	Robinsons La Union		September 24, 2021	San Fernando, La Union
53	Robinsons Gapan		November 30, 2022	Gapan, Nueva Ecija
54	Robinsons Pagadian		April 3, 2025	Pagadian, Zamboanga del Sur
55	The Plaza Bagong Silang		November 28, 2025	Bagong Silang, Caloocan

==== "Robinsons Townville" brand ====
#	Branch Name	Image	Opening Date	Location
1	Robinsons Townville Buhay na Tubig			Imus, Cavite
2	Robinsons Townville BF Parañaque			Parañaque
3	Robinsons Townville Meycauayan			Meycauayan, Bulacan
4	Robinsons Townville Regalado			Quezon City
5	Robinsons Townville Perdices			Dumaguete, Negros Oriental
6	Robinsons Townville Pulilan		2010	Pulilan, Bulacan
7	Robinsons Townville Cabanatuan		November 10, 2008	Cabanatuan, Nueva Ecija

==== Luxury malls ====
#	Branch Name	Image	Opening Date	Location
1	The Mall @ NUSTAR		May 8, 2022	Cebu South Coastal Road, South Road Properties, Cebu City
2	Opus Mall		July 4, 2024	Bridgetowne Destination Estate, Quezon City

==== Malls under-construction ====
#	Branch Name:	Opening Date	Location
1	The Jewel	2027	Mandaluyong
2	Robinsons Bulacan Town Center	2027	Malolos

==== Planned malls ====
#	Branch Name	Location
1	Robinsons Tanay	Km. 55, Manila East Road / Sagbat-Pililla Diversion Road, Tanay, Rizal
2	Robinsons Parañaque	Former Uniwide Sales Coastal Mall site, Manila–Cavite Expressway, Parañaque
3	Robinsons Koronadal	General Santos Drive, Koronadal, South Cotabato
4	Mallengke GenSan	Santiago Boulevard, General Santos, South Cotabato
5	Robinsons Sierra Valley	Sierra Valley Estate, Ortigas Avenue, Cainta, Rizal

=== China ===
==== "Robinsons Galleria" brand ====
#	Branch Name	Opening Date	Location
1	Robinsons Galleria Xiamen (厦门)	2007	Xiahe Rd, Siming District, Xiamen, China
2	Robinsons Galleria Shanghai (上海)	2011	No. 138 Chengzhong Road, Jiading District, Shanghai, China
3	Robinsons Galleria Chengdu (成都)	2018	No. 99, Ren'ai Road, Xindu District, Chengdu, China
4	Robinsons Galleria Taicang (太仓)		Qingyang Road, Taicang, Suzhou, Jiangsu, China
5	Robinsons Galleria Chongqing (重庆)	December 16, 2023	No. 109, Zhongshan 1st Road, Yuzhong District, Chongqing, China

== See also ==
- Robinsons Supermarket
- JG Summit Holdings
- SM Supermalls
- List of shopping malls in the Philippines
