= JG Summit Holdings =

Filipino conglomerate

JG Summit Holdings, Inc.

- Robinsons Equitable Tower, site of the headquarters of JG Summit Holdings
- Type: Public
- Traded as: PSE: JGS
- Industry: Various
- Founded: November 23, 1990; 35 years ago
- Founder: John Gokongwei Jr.
- Headquarters: 43rd Floor, Robinsons Equitable Tower, ADB Avenue cor. P Poveda Street, Ortigas Center, Pasig City, Metro Manila, Philippines, Philippines
- Area served: Philippines
- Key people: James L. Go (Chairman); Lance Gokongwei (President and CEO)
- Products: Petrochemicals
- Services: Banking and investments; Transportation; Real estate; Manufacturing; Publishing; Telecommunications; Power generation
- Revenue: ₱312.4 billion PHP (2022)
- Net income: ₱6.2 billion PHP (2022)
- Subsidiaries: Cebu Pacific; Universal Robina
- Website: Official website

JG Summit Holdings, Inc. (JGSHI) is one of the largest conglomerates in the Philippines with business interests in air transportation, banking, food manufacturing, hotels, petrochemicals, power generation, publishing, real estate and property development, and telecommunications. Key subsidiaries include Universal Robina and Cebu Pacific.

== History ==
JG Summit Holdings incorporated in November 1990, it was founded by John Gokongwei Jr., one of the wealthiest individuals in Southeast Asia. In 2010, JGSHI was one of the ten most profitable companies on the Philippine Stock Exchange.

In February 2021, JG Summit Holdings partnered with Singapore based AI-powered cloud HCM suite Darwinbox. and in October 2025, it expanded its partnership with Darwinbox.

== Companies ==
=== Manufacturing ===
- JG Summit Olefins Corporation
  - Peak Fuel Corporation
- Universal Robina Corporation – is one of the largest branded consumer food and beverage product companies in the Philippines.

=== Real estate ===
- Robinsons Land Corporation
  - Robinsons Malls
  - Go Hotels
  - Dusit Thani Mactan Cebu
  - Robinsons Hotels & Resorts
  - Summit Hotels and Resorts
  - Robinsons Offices
  - RLC Residences
  - Robinsons Destination Estates (Bridgetowne)
  - Robinsons Logistix and Industrials, Inc.
- Singapore Land Group Limited (37.04%)

=== Air transport ===
- Cebu Pacific
  - Aviation Partnership Philippines
  - Cebgo
  - 1Aviation Groundhandling Services Corp (40%)
- LIPAD Corporation (operator of Clark International Airport) – a consortium with Filinvest Development Corporation, Philippine Airport Ground Support Solutions Inc., and Changi Airports Philippines Pte. Ltd.

=== Financial ===
- Bank of the Philippine Islands (9.0292%)
- GoTyme Bank (joint venture with Tyme Group)

=== Utilities ===
- Global Business Power Corporation (30%)
- PLDT, Inc. (11.27%)
- Meralco (29.56%)

=== Others ===
- Robinsons Retail
- Summit Media
- Go Global Business Services, Inc.
- JG Digital Equity Ventures, Inc.
- Data Analytics Ventures, Inc.
- Altus Property Ventures, Inc.
- Universal Hotels and Resorts Inc.
  - Nustar Resort Cebu
- UNICON Insurance & Reinsurance Brokers Corporation
- Gokongwei Brothers Foundation
- DHL Summit Solutions Inc. (joint venture with DHL)
- Merbau Corporation

== Former businesses ==
- Digital Telecommunications Philippines (Digitel and Sun Cellular) – Acquired by PLDT in March 2011. As part of the deal, JG Summit will have a 12% share in PLDT. It was finalized by the National Telecommunications Commission on October 26, 2011.
- Far East Bank and Trust Company – Sold the shares to BPI during the time PCIBank was acquired by Equitable, the GSIS and the SSS.
- Philippine Commercial International Bank (PCI Bank) – A joint venture with the López family of Iloilo through Benpres Holdings Corporation. Both sold their shares in 1999 to the SSS and GSIS which gave way to the Equitable Banking Corporation – Philippine Commercial International Bank merger. The resulting merger was eventually subject to another merger (with Henry Sy's Banco de Oro) in 2006-2007, which resulted in now BDO Unibank, Inc..
- The Manila Times – sold to Katrina Legarda and Reghis Romero in 1999.
- Griffin's Foods (New Zealand) – sold to Intersnack, a subsidiary of German company Pfeifer & Langen.
- Snack Brands Australia (Australia) – sold to Intersnack, a subsidiary of German company Pfeifer & Langen.
- SIA Engineering (Philippines) Corporation – sold the remaining 35% ownership to SIA Engineering Company.
- Robinsons Bank – merged with Bank of the Philippine Islands, (in exchange for them being issued the corresponding stake in BPI)
