= Sacred Heart of Jesus (Roxas, Capiz) =

Giant statue of Jesus Christ in Roxas City, Philippines

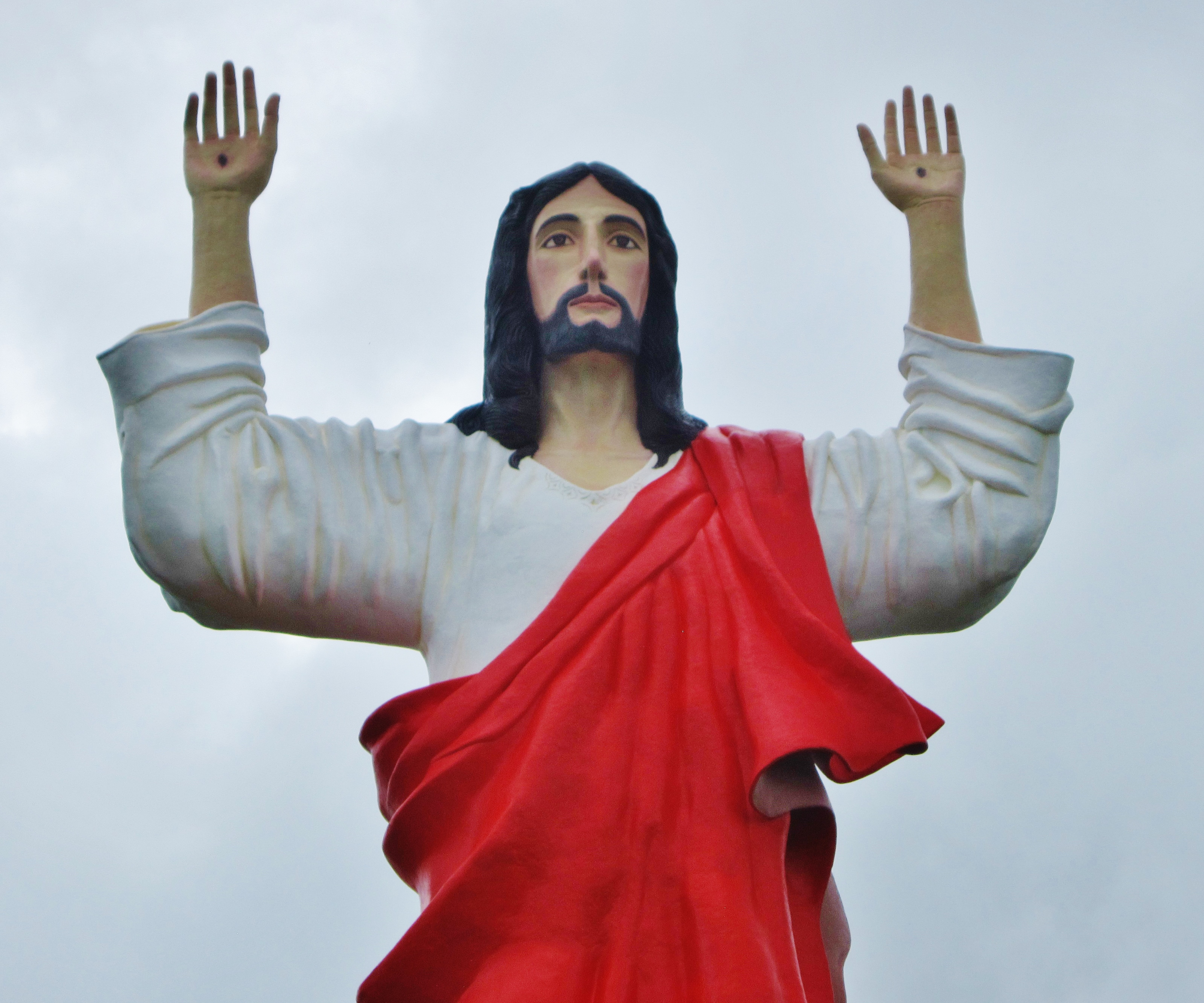
- The Statue in January 2015
- Interactive map of Sacred Heart of Jesus
- Location: Roxas City, Capiz, Philippines
- Coordinates: 11°32′53″N 122°43′39″E
- Designer: John A. Alaban and his seven man team led by Foreman Jose 'Onyot' Clarito (employed by Blue Chips Builders Incorporated)
- Material: steel and concrete
- Height: 31 metres (102 ft) mounted on a 9 metres (30 ft) high pedestal
- Beginning date: last quarter of the year 2011
- Completion date: January 5, 2015

The Sacred Heart of Jesus is a giant statue of Jesus Christ in Roxas City in the Philippines. The 132-foot (40 m) monument, said to be the tallest of its kind in the Philippines, was built in 2015 within the Pueblo de Panay mixed-use development.

== Physical characteristics ==
- Maximum height = 102 ft / 31 m (heel to the tip of the highest finger)
- Chin to cranium = 3.80 m
- Head thickness = 2.50 m (temple to temple)
- Distance between the eye = 0.55 m
- Width of eye = 0.14 m
- Length of eye = 0.49 m
- Eyebrow bridge to cranium = 1.20 m
- Height of nose = 1.20 m
- Base of nose to chin = 1.40 m
- Length of mouth = 0.75 m
- Core wall to the elbow = 5.0 m
- Estimated weight of the head= 6.5 to 7.0 tons (cement used on the head - 50 pcs. 40 kg. bags)

== History ==
The construction of the statue began on the last quarter of 2011 and was completed on January 5, 2015. The construction of the statue was done by a seven-man core team led by a Pilipino sculptor John A. Alaban from Roxas City and the foreman Jose Clarito. As of the date of completion, the giant statue of The Sacred Heart of Jesus of Roxas City is considered the largest life like statue of Jesus Christ in the Philippines.

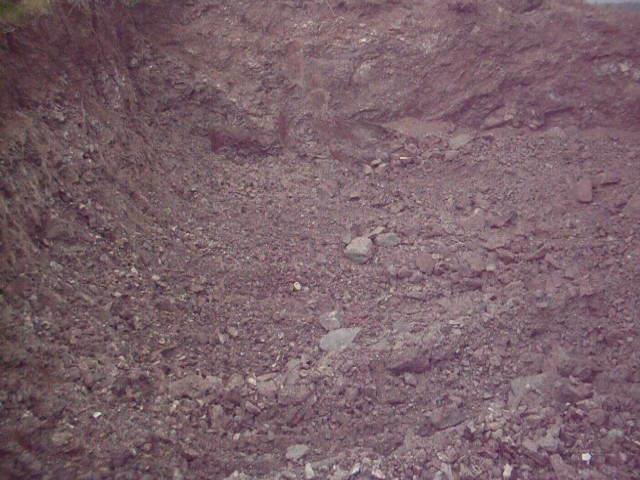
The 30 ft. deep 20 ft.x20 ft. wide excavation for the foundation of the statue

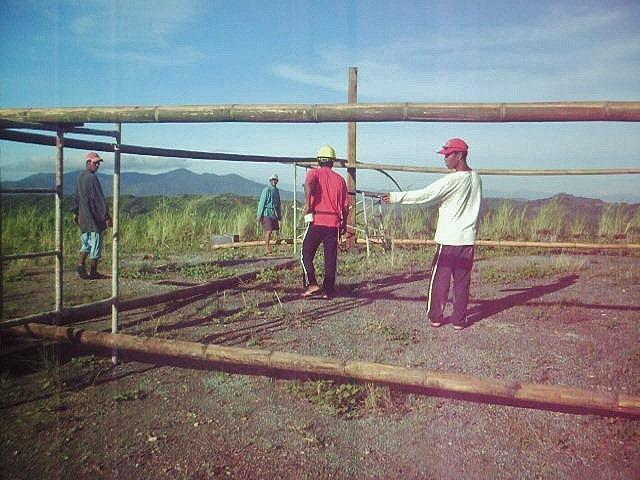
Laying out the excavation site for the foundation of the statue

It took a little more than three years for a seven-man core team to complete the construction but since the work runs on and off, the actual work span could be summed up to only about two years and 8 months more or less. The statue has a maximum height of 102 ft. / 31 m and mounted on a 9m / 30 ft high base making the total height 40 metres (130 ft). It is supported by a 0.40 m thick 3 metres (9.8 ft) by 3 metres (9.8 ft) elevator shaft style reinforced concrete core post. Every level of 3 meters high (equivalent to one standard building floor height) is separated by a horizontal slab. Inside the hollow statue is an access steel stair up to the 8th level. The stairs is for the use of the authorize crew only and is off limits to the public. Since one of the concepts of the construction is the so-called “built to last”, some forms or aesthetics have been deliberately compromised to give way to the stability of the structural design for the safety of the general public.

== Gallery ==
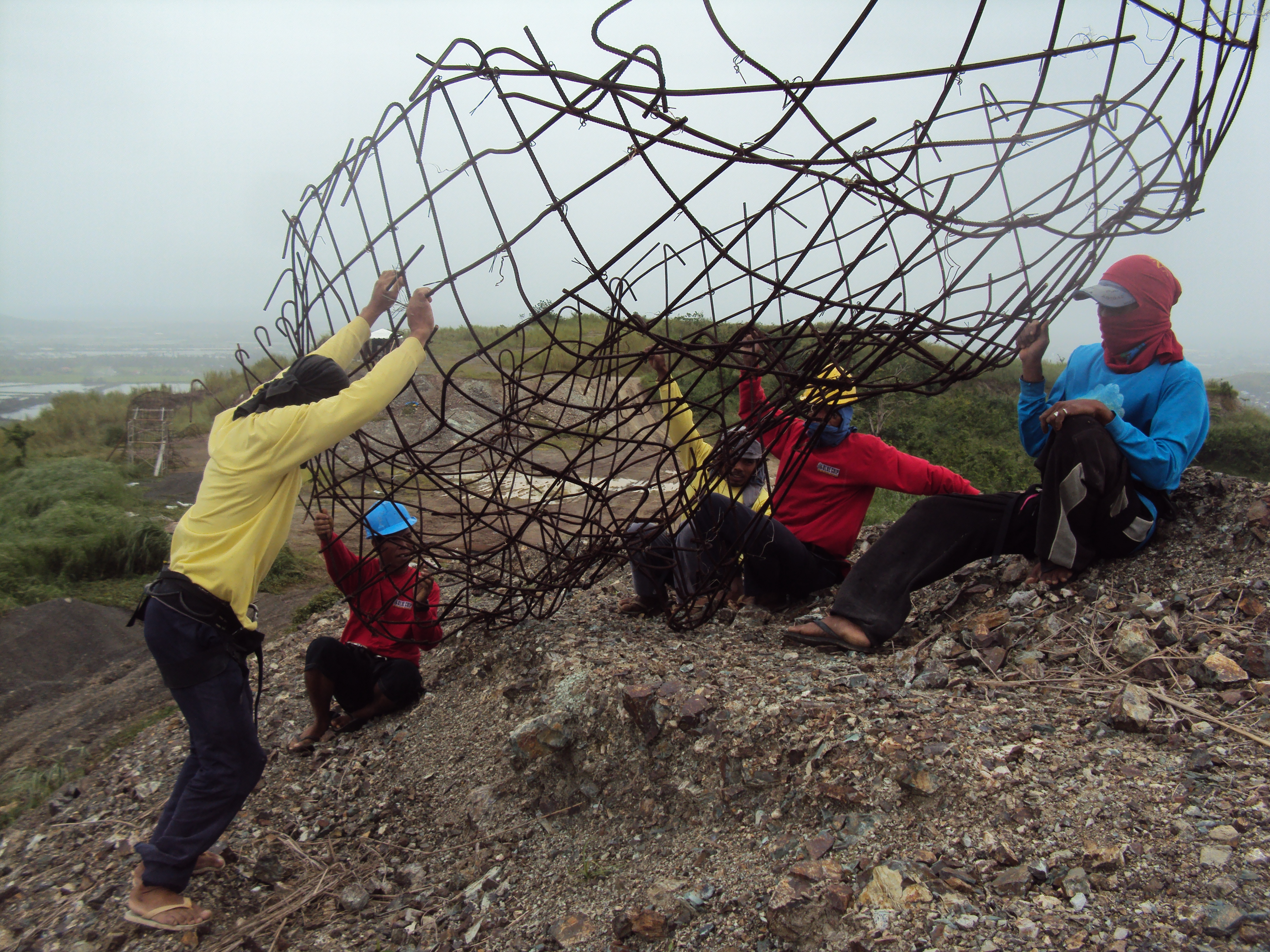
The team preparing to install the armature of the statue's face

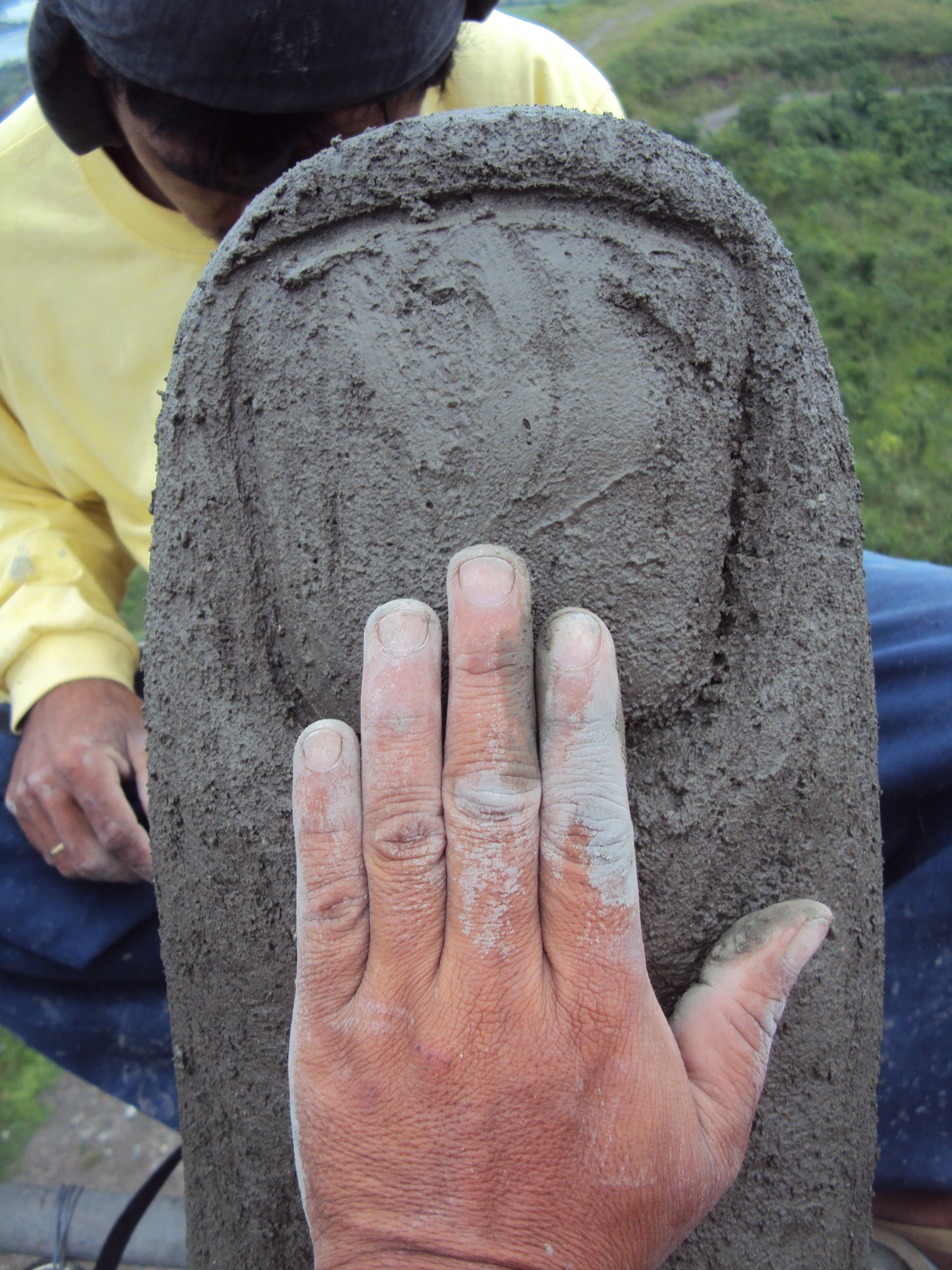
Showing the size of the statue's fingernail compared to the sculptor's hand.

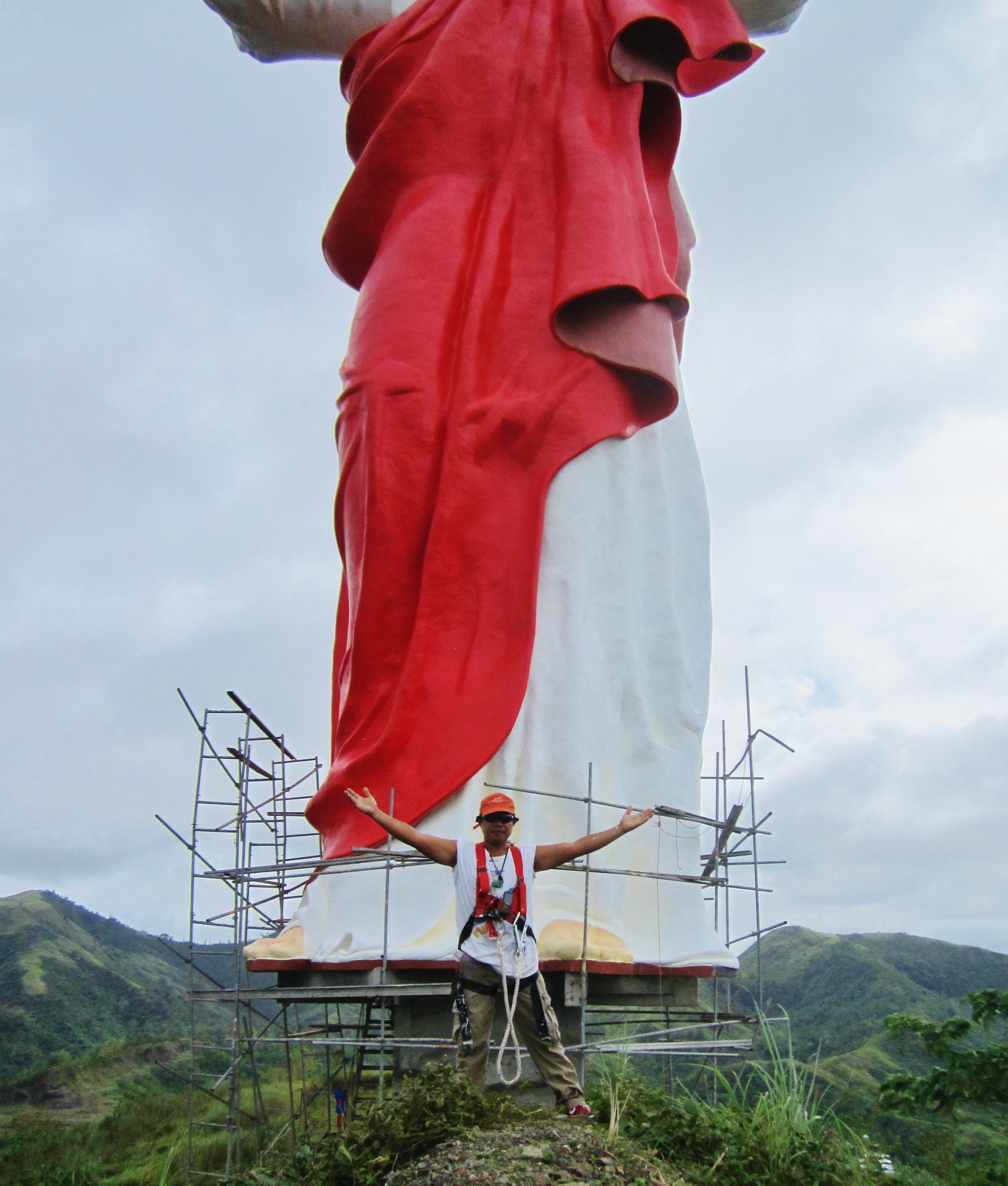
The sculptor John Alaban with giant piece, photo taken during the last day of his work.

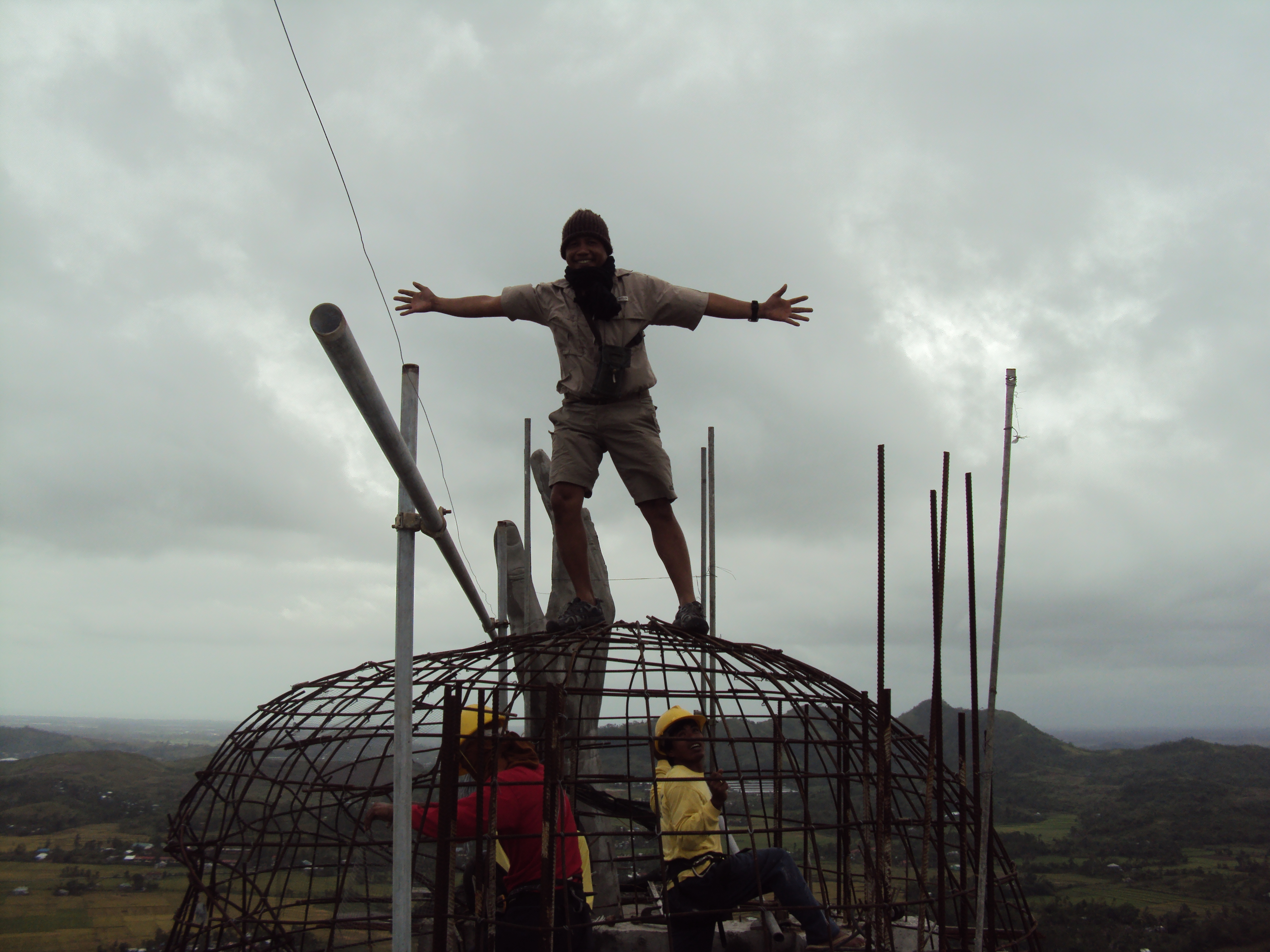
The artistic adviser Joseph Alaban on the top of the head armature of the statue.

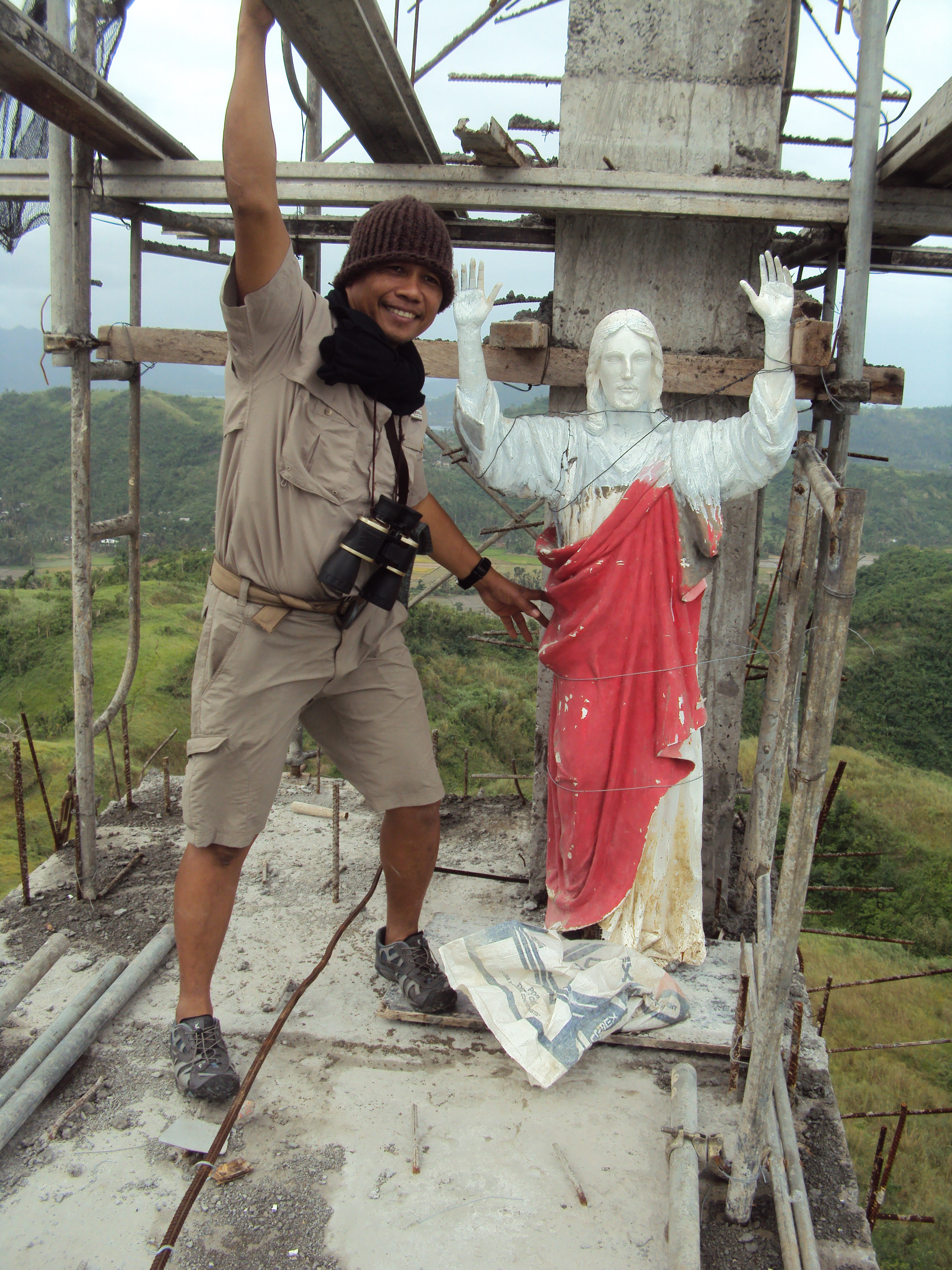
Joseph Alaban artistic adviser and brother of the sculptor inspects the 4 feet high replica of the giant statue.

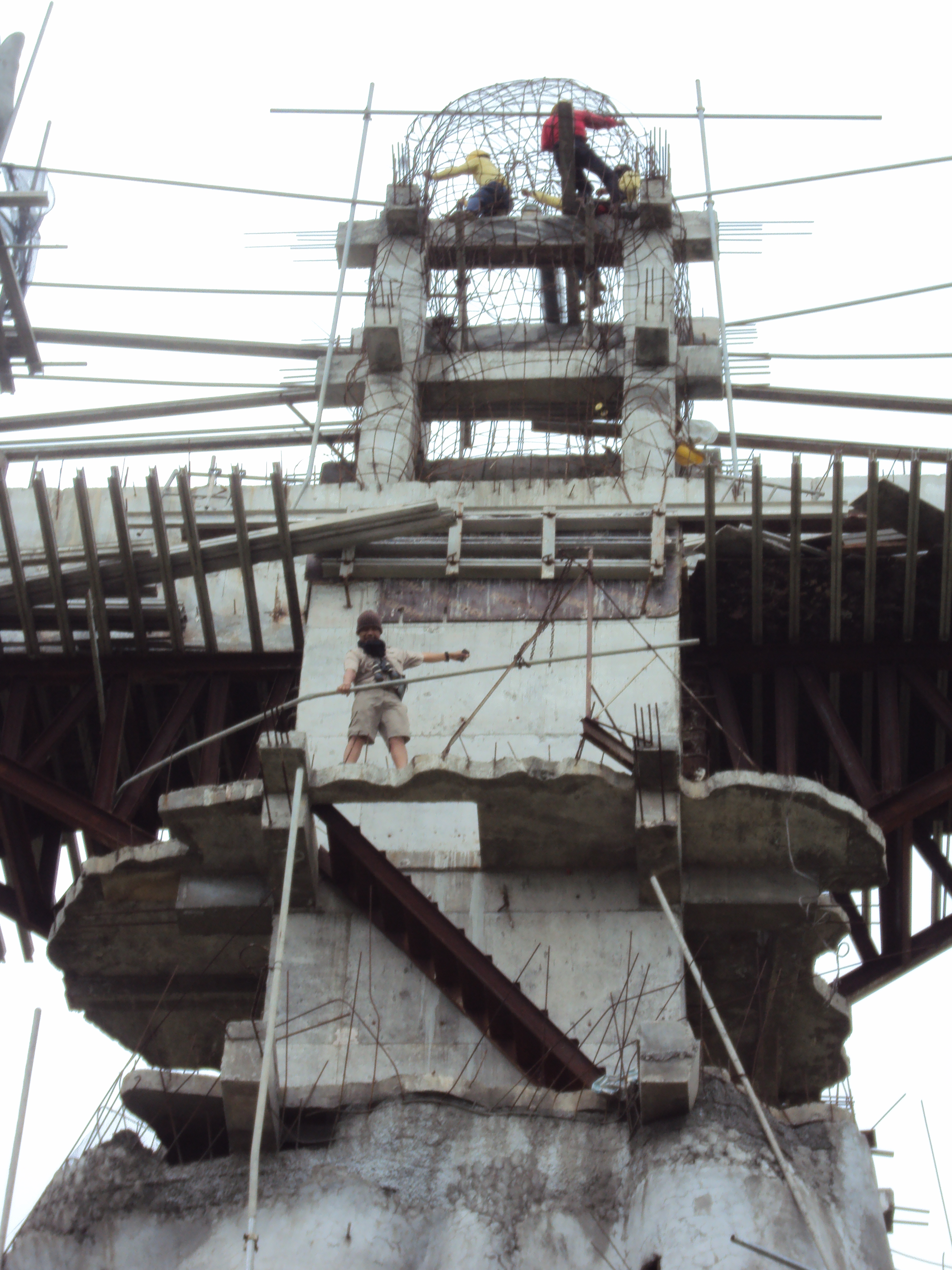
The artistic adviser joseph alaban checking the internal service stairs going up to the head of the statue.

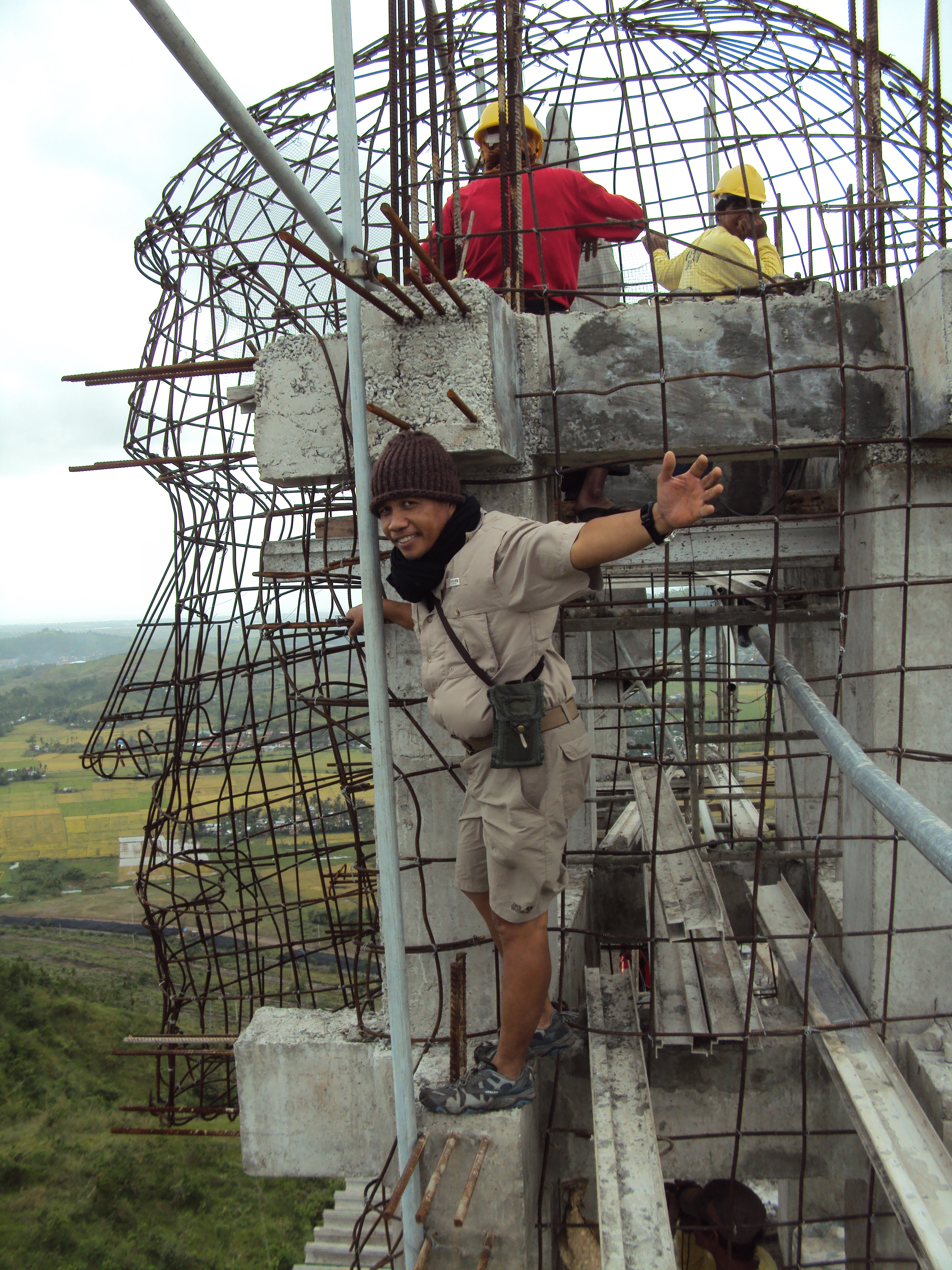
The artistic adviser Joseph alaban checking the face armature of the statue.

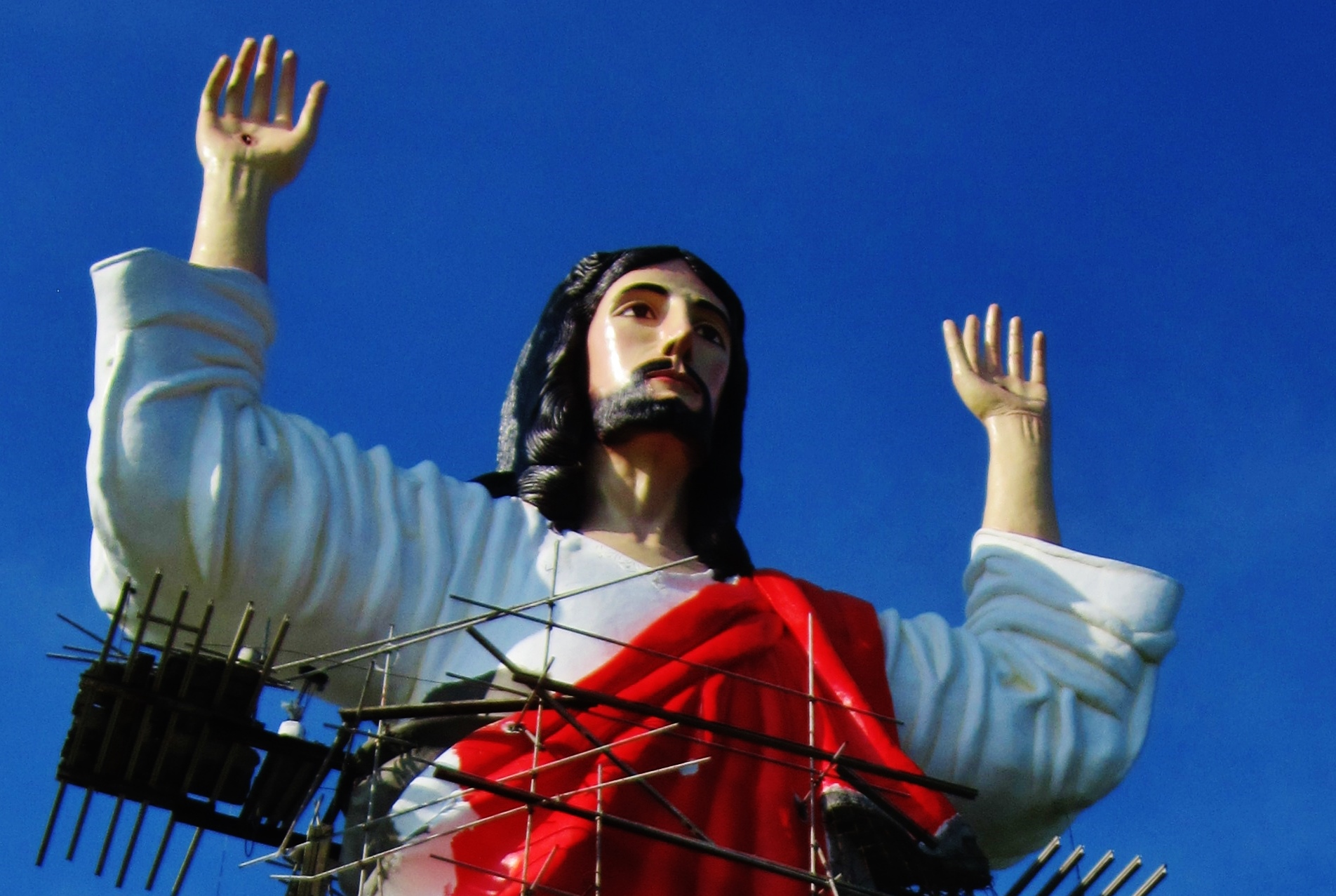
The statue under construction

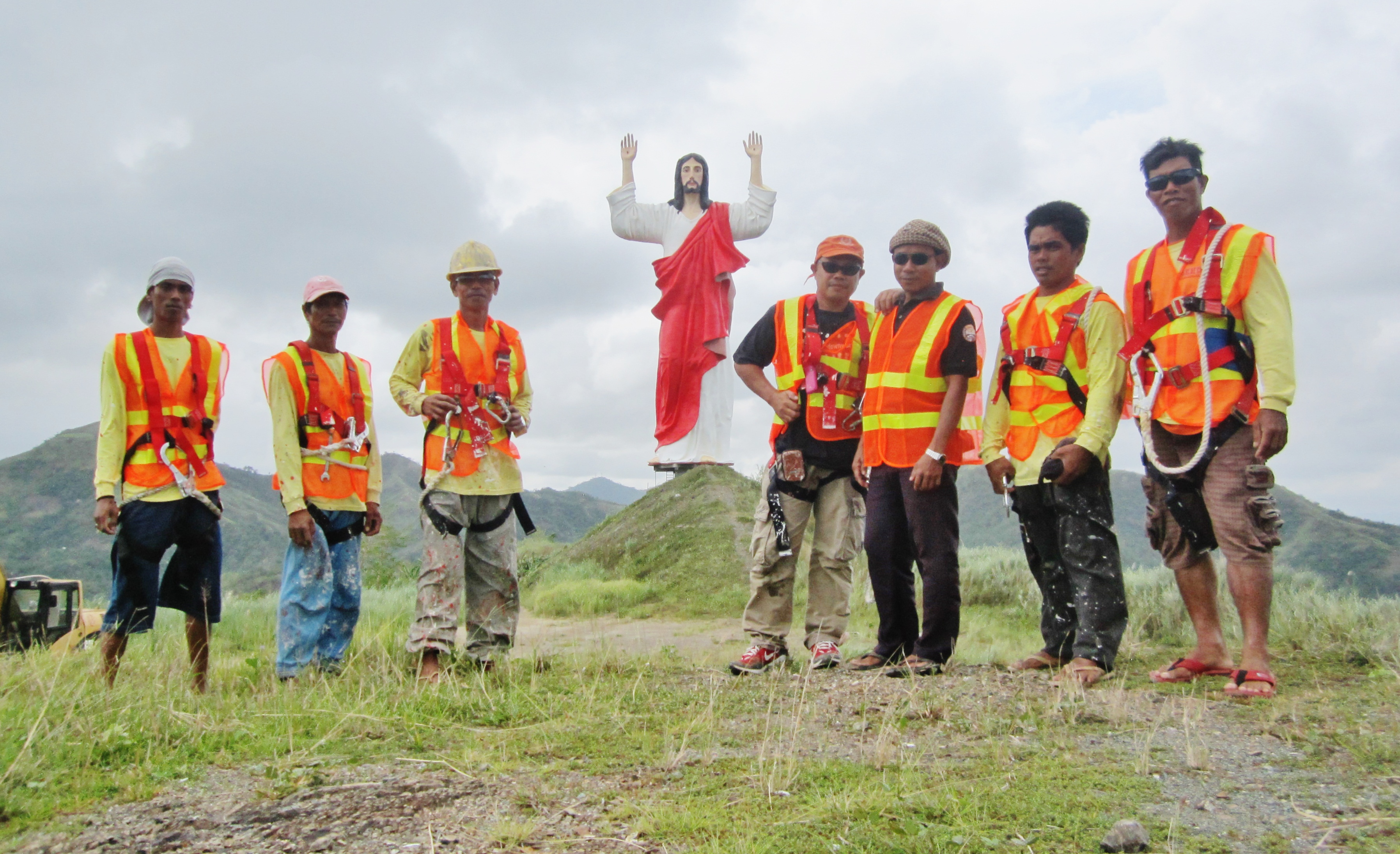
The seven man core team

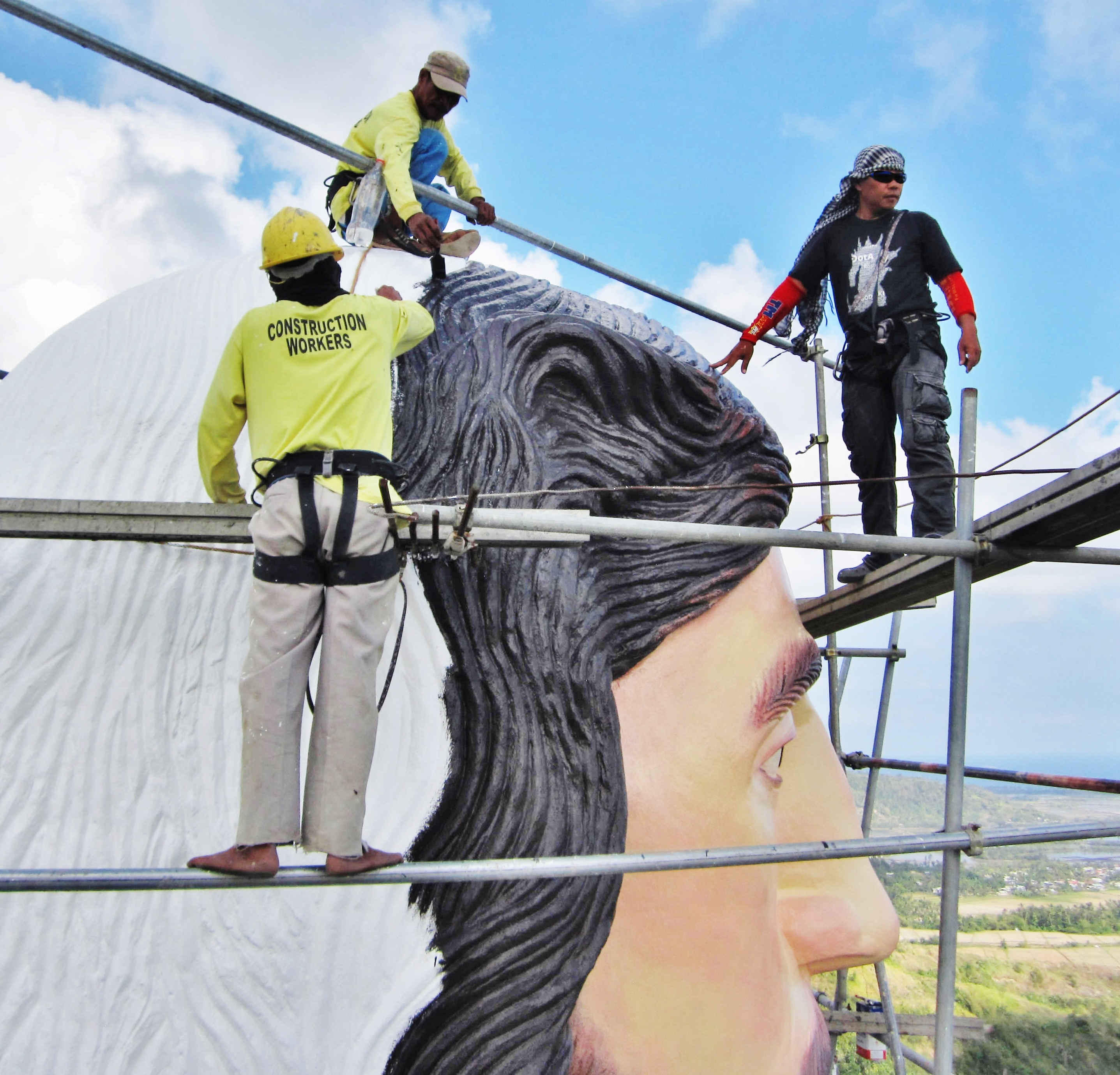
The sculptor on top of the Sacred Heart of Jesus statue

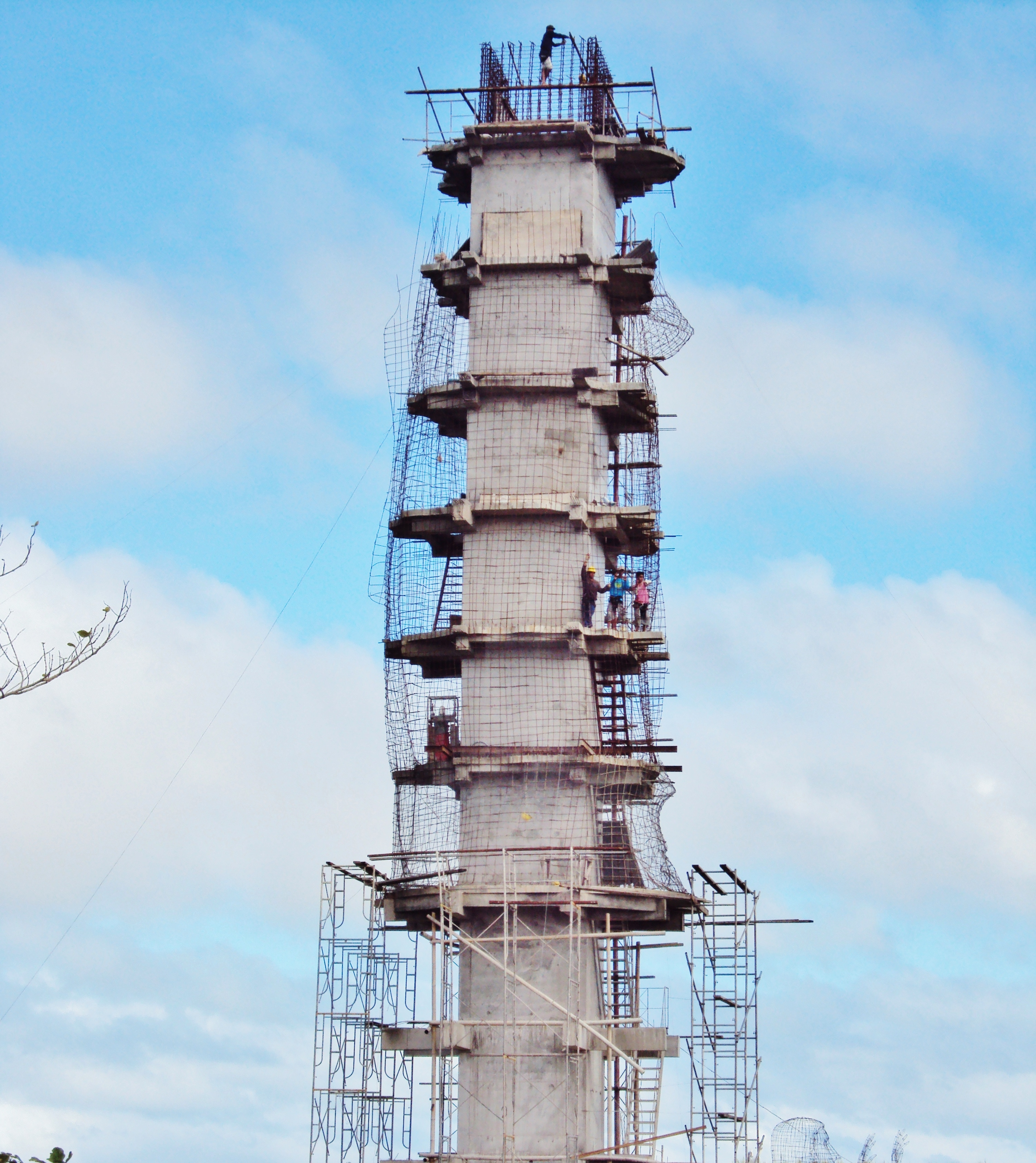
Earlier photo of the statue showing the armature and the 3m x 3m core shaft

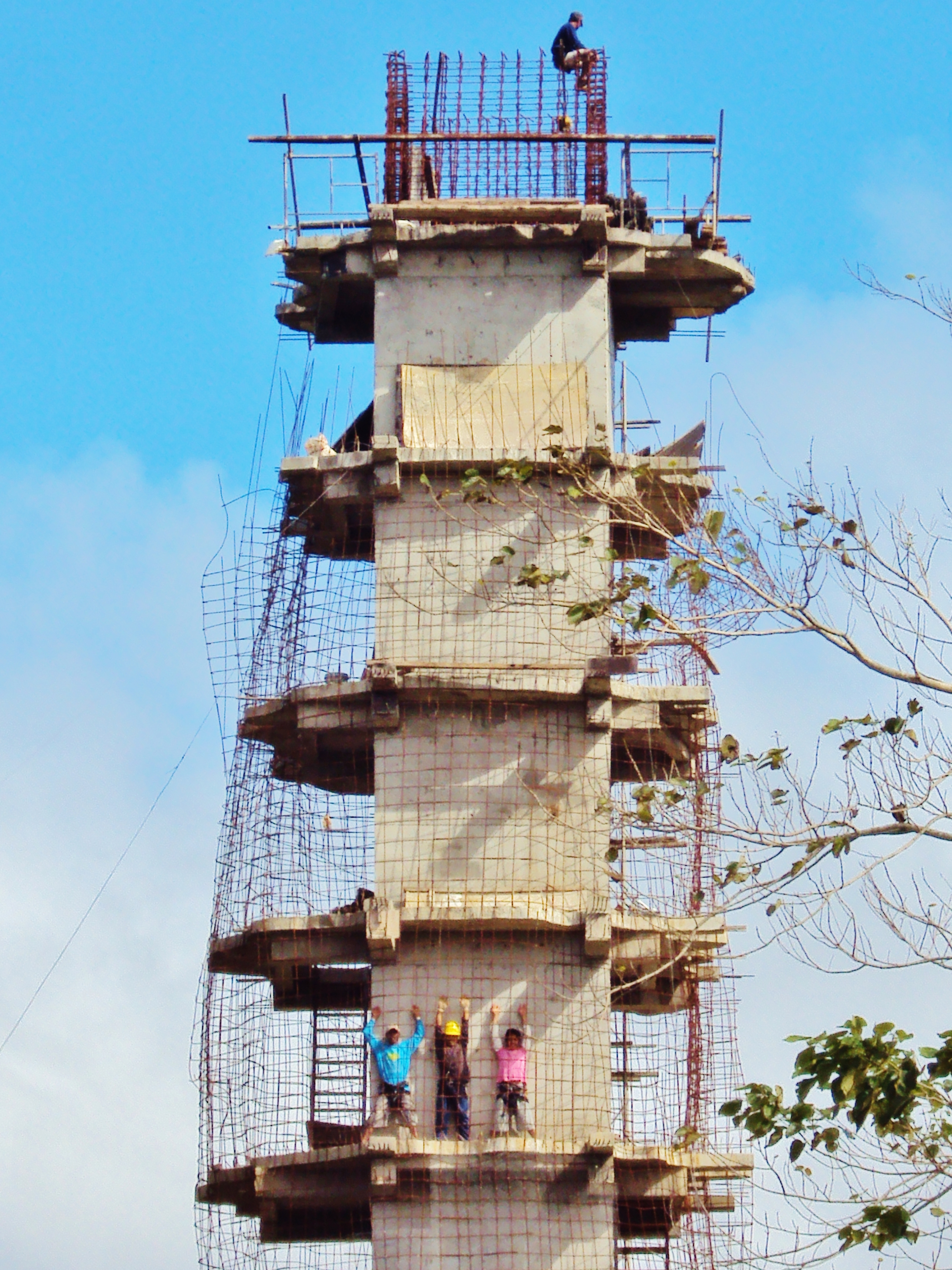
A work in progress - the core shaft, January 29, 2013

== See also ==
- List of statues of Jesus
