= St. Anthony College =

Roman Catholic college in Capiz, Philippines

- Former names: St. Anthony School of Nursing and Midwifery (1956-1980)
- Type: Private Roman Catholic Non-profit Coeducational Senior high school and Higher education institution
- Established: 1958; 68 years ago
- Founders: Sr. Alicia Ongsuco, D.C. Sr. Paula Vargas, D.C.
- Religious affiliation: Roman Catholic (Sisters of Charity)
- Academic affiliations: CEAP
- President: Sr. Carmen V. Abad, D.C.
- Location: San Roque Extension Street, Roxas City, Capiz, Philippines; 11°34′41″N 122°45′25″E
- Campus: Urban
- Colors
- Nickname: Vincentian Anthonian
- Website: www.sachri.edu.ph
- Location in the Visayas Location in the Philippines

St. Anthony College, better known as St. Anthony College of Roxas City, is Catholic school in Roxas City, Capiz, Philippines. It is a non-profit, non-stock educational institution that is owned and managed by the Daughters of Charity of Saint Vincent de Paul. It is the only Catholic Institution in Northern Panay which offers health-related courses.

== History ==
The St. Anthony College of Roxas city works with St. Anthony Hospital. The hospital was founded in 1956 by Mr. and Mrs. Pio Bernas, with the help of Gaudencio Ortañez. Rev. Antonio Frondoza suggested asking the assistance of the Daughters of Charity of Saint Vincent de Paul.

Two years later, in 1958 the school was established, initiated by Sr. Alicia Ongsuco, D.C. and Sr. Paula Vargas, D.C. together with a group of doctors, nurses, midwives and other educators. They began to teach young women midwifery. The curriculum included training in the skills of deliveries, patient and environmental care.

In 1959, the school graduated its first 27 midwives. Milagros Dogillo-Lajo, one of its first graduates, topped the 1959 Midwifery Board examination.

Due to the consistent increase in enrollment and new demands for future health professionals, a three-year Graduate Nurse (G.N) Program was opened in June 1963 through the initiative of Sr. Ricarda Mendoza, D.C.

In the following years, as the school continued to grow, another course Liberal Arts, major in Sociology, was opened in June 1975 by Sr. Aniana Matalote, D.C.

Sr. Norma Ysaac, D.C. moved to phase out the three-year G.N. program to introduce the Bachelor of Science in nursing. The Department of Education, Culture and Sports, granted it recognition on June 13, 1978 . With this new program, the name of the school was officially changed in 1980 to St. Anthony College of Roxas City. In 1994 the college offered two new courses: Bachelor of Science in Physical Therapy and Health Aide; in 1998, Respiratory Therapy and Food Technology and in June 2003, the college opened a six-month Health Care Giver course. However, when the demand for physical Therapists went down in the early 2000, the Physical Therapy course was discontinued for lack of enrollees. For the same reason, the Food Technology and Respiratory Courses were suspended.

Because of the increase in the enrollment in Nursing, the Health Care Giver Course was temporarily discontinued. The Health Aide Course is intended to prepare Nursing assistants, but because the Health Care Course, which includes Home Management, is in demand worldwide, the two courses were combined in 2006.

== Hospital ==
St. Anthony College of Roxas City Hospital, located at San Roque Extension, is a non-profit, non-stock health institution owned and managed by the Daughters of Charity of St. Vincent de Paul. SACH is licensed by the DOH as a tertiary hospital and accredited by the Philippine Health Insurance Corporation. It is a member of the Philippine Hospital Association.

=== History ===
St. Anthony College Hospital was founded in June 1956 by Mr. and Mrs. Pio Bernas who, having realized the need for more health care facilities in Roxas City and in Capiz, initiated the project with the help of Dr. Gaudencio Ortañez. Having given his blessings for the project, the Most Reverend Antonio F. Frondosa, D.D., former Bishop of Capiz sought the assistance of the Daughters of Charity of St. Vincent de Paul. Four Daughters of Charity - Sr. Vicenta Ayerbe, D.C. Sr. Alicia P. Ongsuco, D.C. Sr. Eleuteria S. Ambulo, D.C. and Sr. Maura Matayabas, D.C. - answered the call.

The seven-door apartment of the Bernas Family was converted into a health facility of 50 beds. Two years later, the school was established with the hospital, as its clinical laboratory.

From its 50-bed capacity, the hospital has grown to 135 beds, and 36 beds have been added recently for the hospital's service ward. Now known as St. Anthony College of Roxas City Inc., the hospital with its complex buildings and expanded Ancillary Services renders service to every Capiceño.
