= Roxas City =

Capital city of Capiz, Philippines

- Component city
- City of Roxas
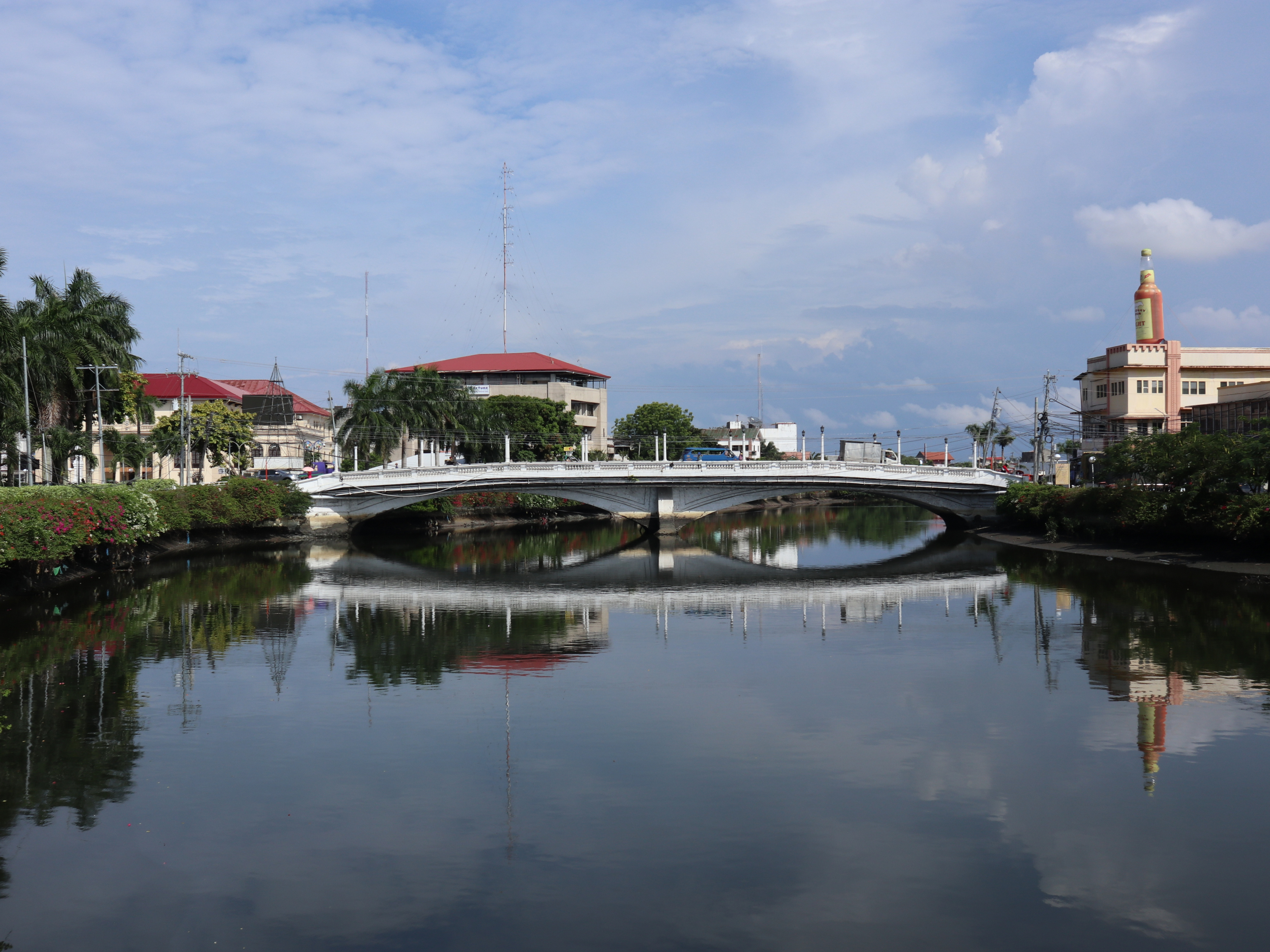
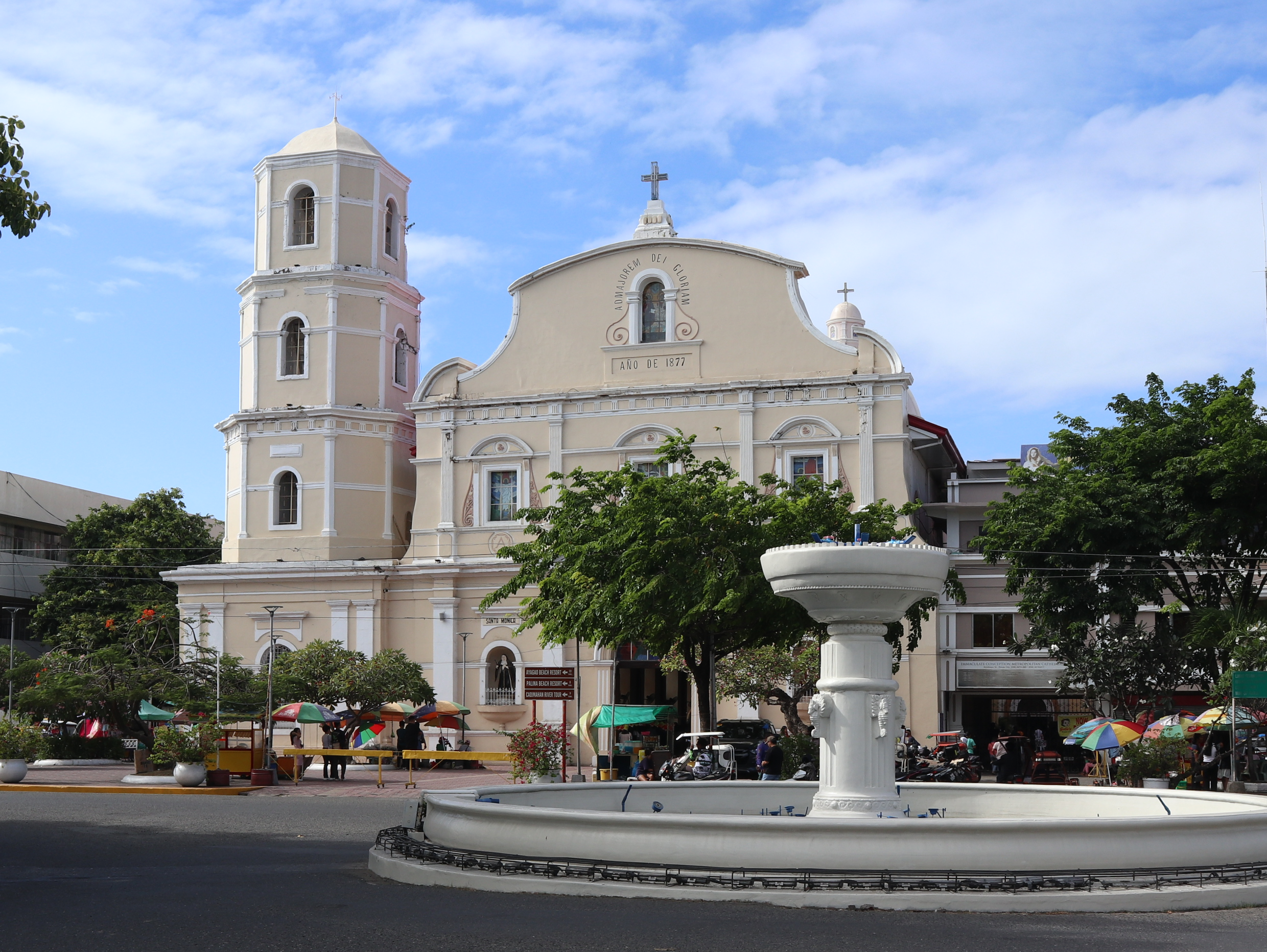
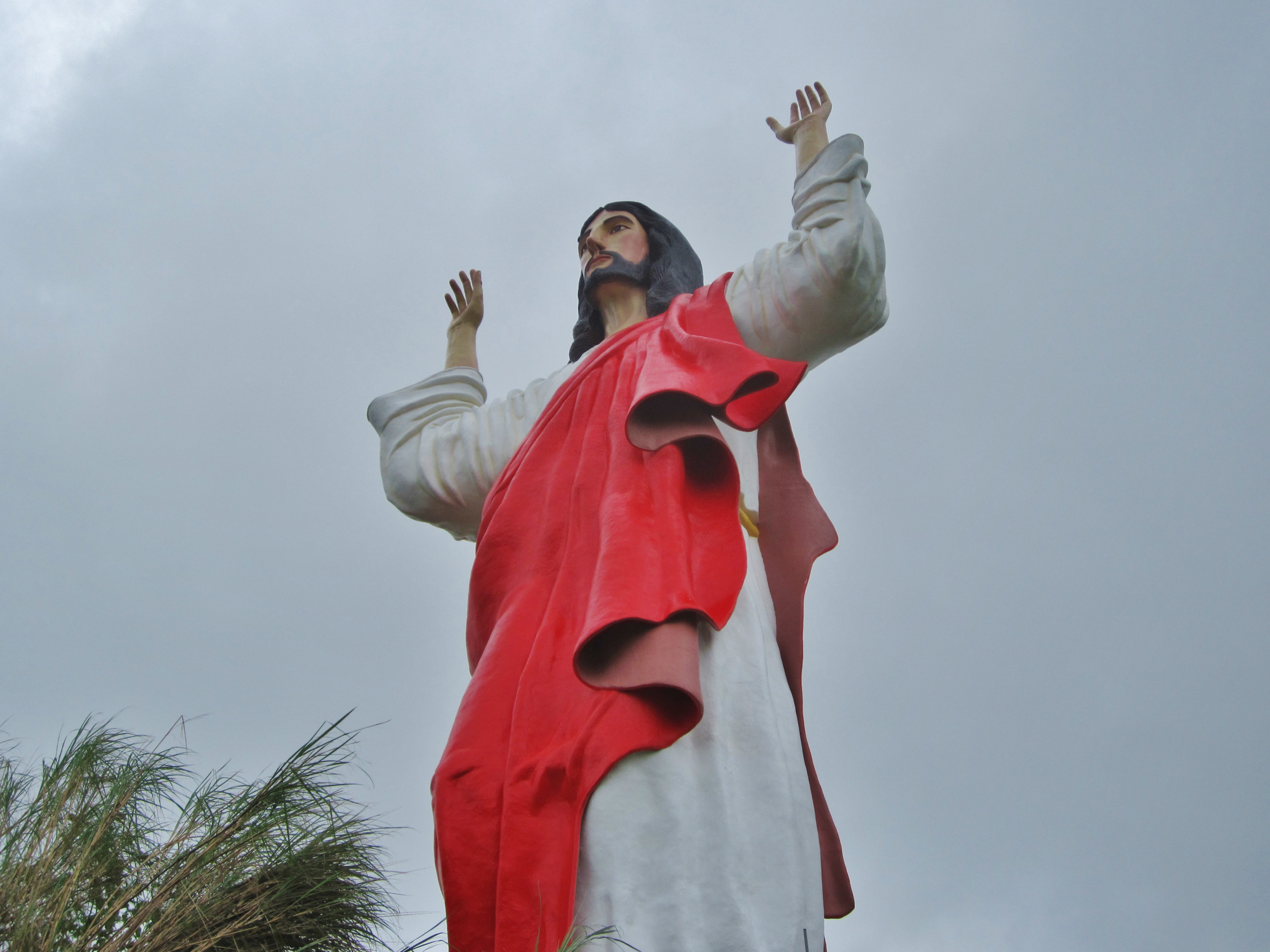
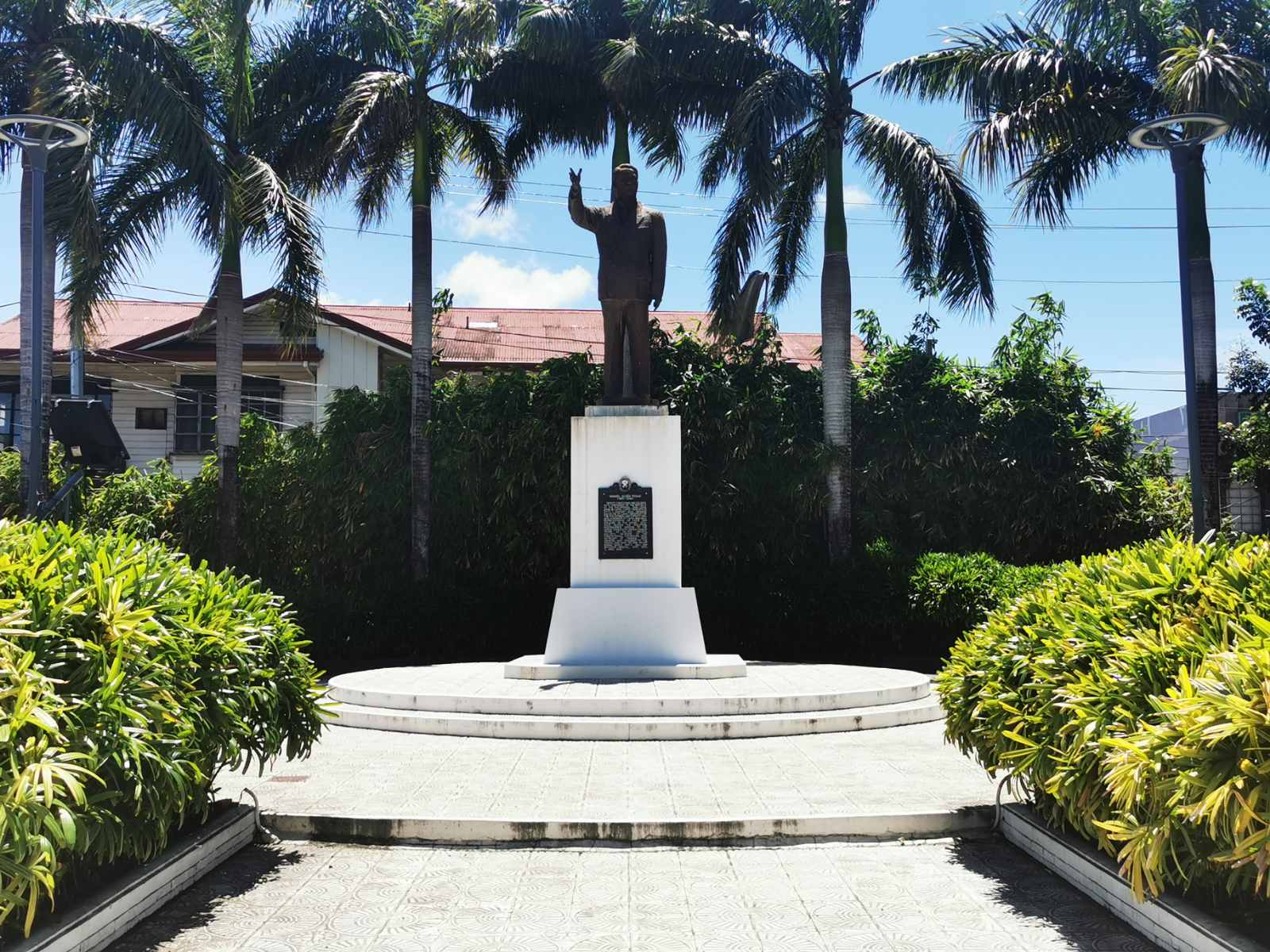
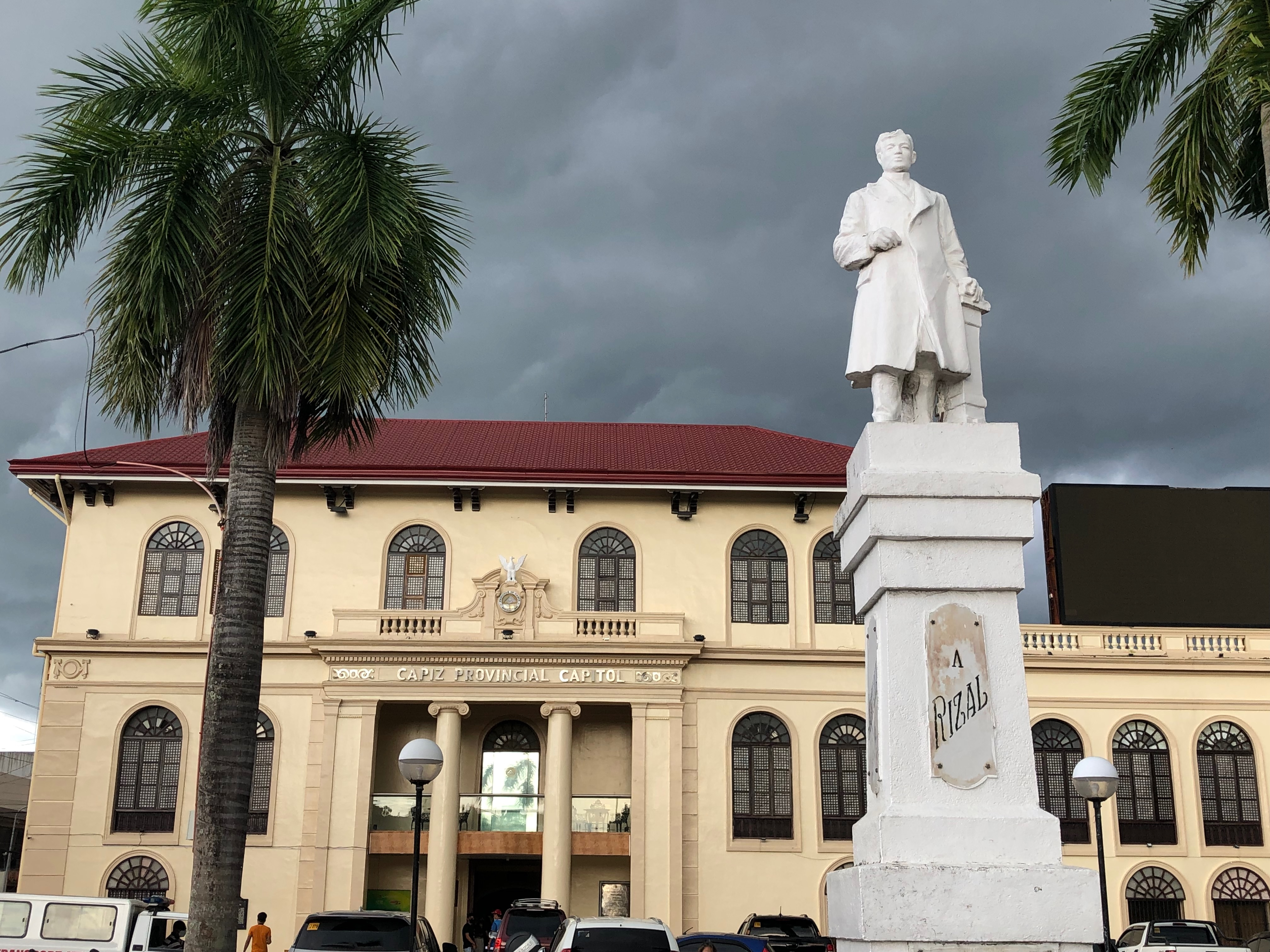
- Clockwise from top: Roxas City Bridge over the Panay River, Sacred Heart of Jesus statue, Capiz Provincial Capitol, Manuel Roxas statue, Roxas Cathedral

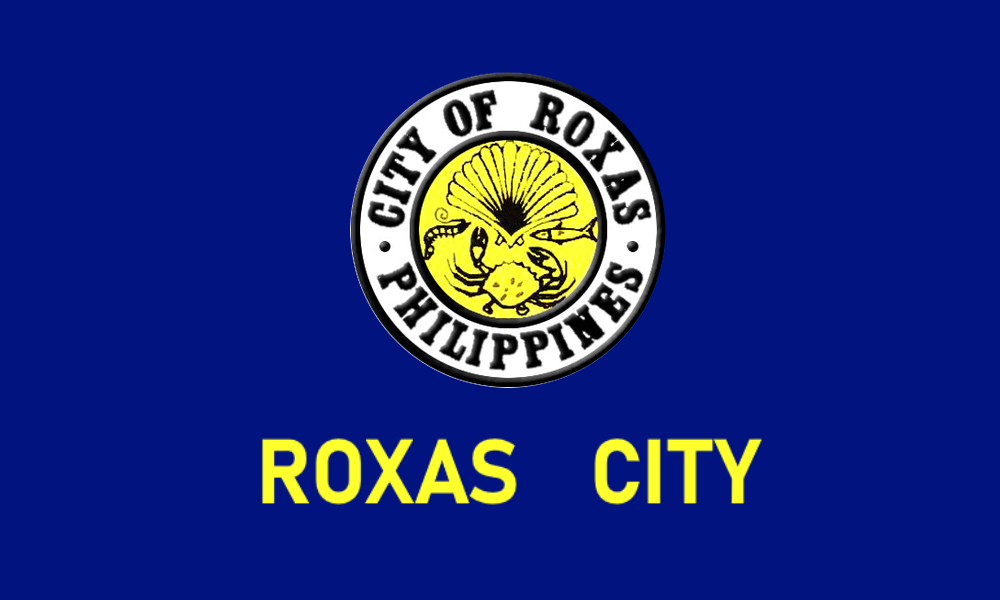
- Flag Seal
- Nickname: Seafood Capital of the Philippines
- Anthem: Ang Banwa kong Pinalangga (The Town I Love)
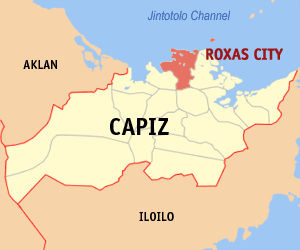
- Map of Capiz with Roxas City highlighted
- Interactive map of Roxas City
- Location within the Philippines Roxas City (Philippines)
- Coordinates: 11°35′22″N 122°45′04″E
- Country: Philippines
- Region: Western Visayas
- Province: Capiz
- District: 1st district
- Founded: 1569
- Cityhood: May 12, 1951
- Named for: Manuel Acuña Roxas
- Barangays: 47 (see Barangays)

Government
  - Type: Sangguniang Panlungsod
  - Mayor: Ronnie T. Dadivas (1Capiz)
  - Vice Mayor: Teresa H. Almalbis (1Capiz)
  - Representative: Ivan Howard A. Guintu (IND)
  - City Council: Members: Victor Federico B. Acepcion; Jaime Cortes M. Altavas; Paul Ivan R. Baticados; Earl C. Sicad; John Paul J. Arcenas; Fernando Luis A. Viterbo; Reynaldo C. Magallanes; Midelo D. Ocampo; Herbert S. Chu; Gia Tuazon-Potato; Roberto Ross Roldan(ABC/LNB Pres./Ex-Officio); Martin Antonio II Pimentel (SK Fed. Pres./Ex-Officio)
  - Electorate: 112,738 voters (2025)

Area
  - Total: 95.07 km^{2} (36.71 sq mi)
- Elevation: 7.0 m (23.0 ft)
- Highest elevation: 383 m (1,257 ft)
- Lowest elevation: −2 m (−6.6 ft)

Population (2024 census)
  - Total: 185,236
  - Density: 1,948/km^{2} (5,046/sq mi)
  - Households: 43,257

Economy
  - Income class: 2nd city income class
  - Poverty incidence: 6.54% (2023)
  - Revenue: ₱ 1,375 million (2024)
  - Assets: ₱ 3,592 million (2024)
  - Expenditure: ₱ 601.7 million (2024)
  - Liabilities: ₱ 469.7 million (2024)

Service provider
  - Electricity: Capiz Electric Cooperative (CAPELCO)
- Time zone: UTC+8 (PST)
- ZIP code: 5800
- PSGC: 061914000
- IDD : area code: +63 (0)36
- Native languages: Capisnon; Hiligaynon; Tagalog
- Website: www.roxascity.gov.ph

Roxas (Tagalog pronunciation: [ˈɾohas], Spanish pronunciation: [ˈroxas]), officially the City of Roxas (Capiznon/Hiligaynon: Dakbanwa sang Roxas; Filipino: Lungsod ng Roxas), is a component city and the capital of the province of Capiz, Philippines. According to the 2024 census, it has a population of 185,236 people, making it the most populous city in Capiz and the second-most populous city in Western Visayas, after Iloilo City.

Originally known as the municipality of Capiz (from which the province derives its name), it became a chartered city on May 12, 1951, and was renamed in honor of native Manuel Roxas, the fourth president of the Philippines and the first president of the independent Third Philippine Republic.

Roxas City is the center of education, trade, economic activity, and logistics in Capiz. The abundance of marine life has earned the city the nickname "Seafood Capital of the Philippines".

== History ==
=== Spanish colonial period ===
In 1569, Captain Diego de Artieda, who was sent by Miguel López de Legazpi from Cebu, landed on the shores of the town of Panay and proclaimed it as the area's capital. Later, the capital was moved to its present site upon realising that the town of Capiz was nearer to the sea and possessed better ground for docking facilities. The Spaniards saw the long coastal cover and envisioned a trading and shipping. Ports were subsequently built in Libas and Culasi.

The Panay River divided the original settlement in two, and had tributaries from the mountains that flowed through communities that sprang up along its shores. The river provided irrigation and gradually fertilized the land, and during high tide, it provided water to the lowlands than became a private and commercial fishponds that exist to this day.

In 1590, the Spanish navy coming from Acapulco, Viceroyalty of Mexico made the port of Capiz its naval yard where ships sought shelter when the sea was rough. Capiz grew into a bustling port and houses of stone were built. The social and political status enjoyed by indigenous rulers of Capiz often resulted in mixed marriages with colonial Spaniards. Their mestizo descendants became the base of the town's set of Principalía, the colony's noble or patrician class. Their privileged status enabled them to build houses near the población, the downtown area whose focal points was the plaza, the local chapel along Burgos Street, and the government complex. Their children became the beneficiaries of the Augustinian mission in 1593.

In 1746, Capiz was made the seat of the politico-military government separating from the clutches of Iloilo in almost 200 years, although it was ecclesiastically controlled by the Bishopric of Cebu. In the latter part of 1795, under Gobernadorcillo Miguel Bautista, the old road to Baybay was built as an extension of calle San Roque.

The town was frequently attacked by Muslims that in 1814, stone forts at Baybay Beach (Baluarte) were built through the initiative of Gobernadorcillo José Consolación.

In 1870, ground was broken for the construction of Capiz Cathedral under the guidance of Reverend Apolonio Alvarez. It was built by sturdy hands of Capizeños, some of which were under the polo y servicios system which was the equivalent of present-day taxes. In 1876, the Diocese of Jaro in Iloilo was erected, and Capiz came under its jurisdiction. Finally in 1877, the cathedral was finished.

During the Philippine Revolution, the Spanish colonial government capitulated on August 31, 1898, when Governor Juan Herrero formally surrendered to General Ananias Diokno along Baybay area.

==== Historical account of Pedro G. Gallardo ====
Capiz is located on a small island formed by the Panay and Banica rivers. The Panay River was famous, it is said by the great number of caimanes (alligators). The soil is poor in the northern part of the island and is most productive only in the southern part. Fr. Agustin Estrada was named prior that same year. In 1707, it was declared an independent parish under the advocation of Our Lady of the Immaculate Conception.

The private council of 1716 created this town which was originally named El Puerto de Capiz, a vicariate under Fr. Pedro Vivaldi (?) as prior-vicar. In 1728, the convent was relieved from paying any rent to San Agustin Monastery. And likewise, in 1732. This suggests that the convent was rather poor or that the priors were building the parochial edifices. By this time, Loctugan and Ibisan were assigned to it as visitas.

In the middle of the 18th century, Capiz was declared the capital city of the province of the same name which later became “the most famous sea port and the biggest ministry the Augustinians had in that province.” Capiz (or Capis) was renowned all over for its shells, the capis used for capiz-shell window panes on houses and convents all throughout the Philippines. Tradition holds that this is the place where the Visayas dialect is spoken with “more propriety and musicality” and where “women dress with more neatness, and elegance” The Capizeños showed special loyalty to Spain during the British invasion, by sending money and ammunition to Manila and jailing the alcalde mayor, Señor Quintanilla, who was caught “conducting secret negotiation to have the province handed over peacefully to the British.”

In 1732, Capiz had 2,327 souls. In 1760 Capiz had 3,971 of which 16 were Spaniards. By the tail-end of 1700s, Capiz was home to 89 Spanish-Filipino families.

In 1896, its population increased to 17,683. In 1990, it reached 103,171.

Capiz was a progressive city in 1891, its exports through the sea port, reached 1,800,000 pesos and imports were valued at 900,000 pesos. It was a joy to watch, in the old times, the many boats converging, often at the same time, at the port to load rice.” The primitive church was built before 1698, the year in which the typhoon of January 4 destroyed it together with the convent. According to a document, the priest found it difficult “to rebuild them because the people were not used to work.” Fortunately, Fr. Domingo Horbegoso, minister of Capiz, started building the church in 1728, the year in which the convent was relieved from paying any rent to San Agustin Monastery. The construction seemed to have continued, at least until 1732.

Capiz was founded in 1693 under the advocation of Our Lady of the Immaculate Conception.

=== American colonial period ===
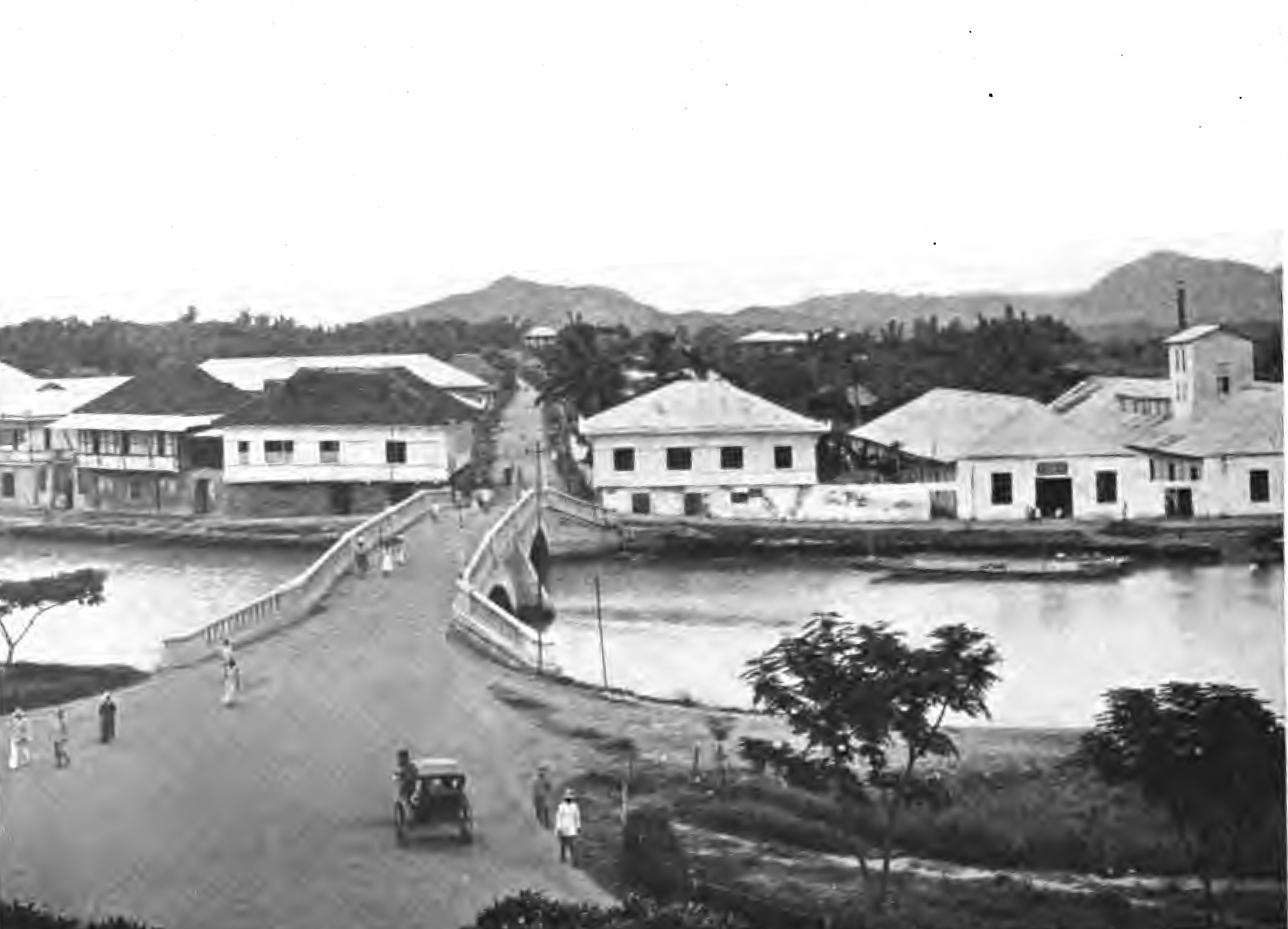
Capiz (c.1917)

After 300 years under Spanish rule, the Philippine Islands came under the sovereignty of the United States of America. By the early 1900s, Protestant missionaries arrived in the Islands, which the various denominations subsequently agreed to divide into mission territories. Western Visayas went to the American Baptists; Baptist institutions such as Filamer Christian University, Central Philippine University, Capiz Emmanuel Hospital were later established. In August 1904, Rev. and Mrs. Joseph Robbins were entrusted with care of three little children. This situation of neglected homeless children touched their hearts which led to the establishment of Capiz Home School, with the first building being a gift from the American Baptist Foreign Mission Society. The Capiz Home School was later renamed Filamer Christian University, "Filamer" being a portmanteau of "Filipino" and "American".

In 1914, an economic debacle hit the town of Capiz when the Ayala Distillery abruptly stopped operations. What could have been an ambitious forerunner of nationalized industrialization became the victim of the Internal Revenue Law under American control.

In 1917, Division Superintendent of Schools F.E. Hemingway founded Capiz Trade School for intermediate pupils. The institution offered woodworking as the only vocational course. The next division superintendent opened Capiz High School.

In 1926, Division Superintendent Arthur Wittman authorized teaching of complete secondary curriculum in the Capiz Trade School. In the same year, Culasi Port was built to accommodate inter-island ships.

=== Cityhood ===
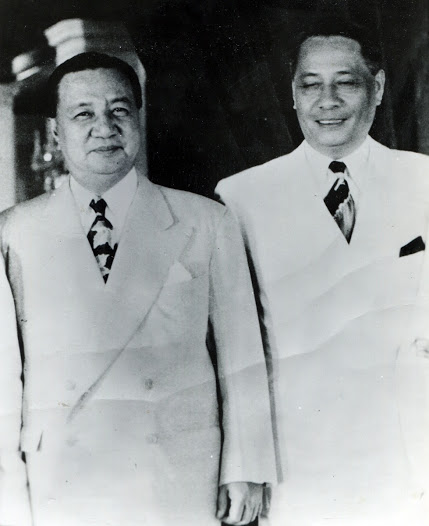
Elpidio Quirino and Manuel Roxas

Capiz became a chartered city on May 12, 1951, through House Bill 1528, sponsored by Ramón Acuña Arnaldo, the Representative of the First District Capiz. It was approved by President Elpidio Quirino, Roxas' successor, on April 11, 1951, as Republic Act 603. Consequently, the town was renamed Roxas City after the late Manuel Roxas, the last President of the Commonwealth and the first President of the Third Republic.

The city's first appointed Mayor was Lorenzo Acuña Arnaldo, followed by Ramón Berjamin Blanco, José Dorado, and Juliano Alovera Alba. In 1959, Arnaldo became the city's first elected head. He was succeeded by Teodoro Roxas Arcenas, who himself was succeeded by Juliano Alovera Alba. Alba was also the Representative of the First District Capiz when President Ferdinand Marcos declared Martial Law nationwide on September 21, 1972.

Antonio A. del Rosario, the former Representative of the First District of Capiz, was elected to three terms as Mayor, serving from 1998 to 2007. Vicente B. Bermejo, the former governor of the Province of Capiz, was elected Mayor and served from 2007 to 2010.

Roxas City's current mayor is Ronnie T. Dadivas who was elected in 2019.

== Geography ==
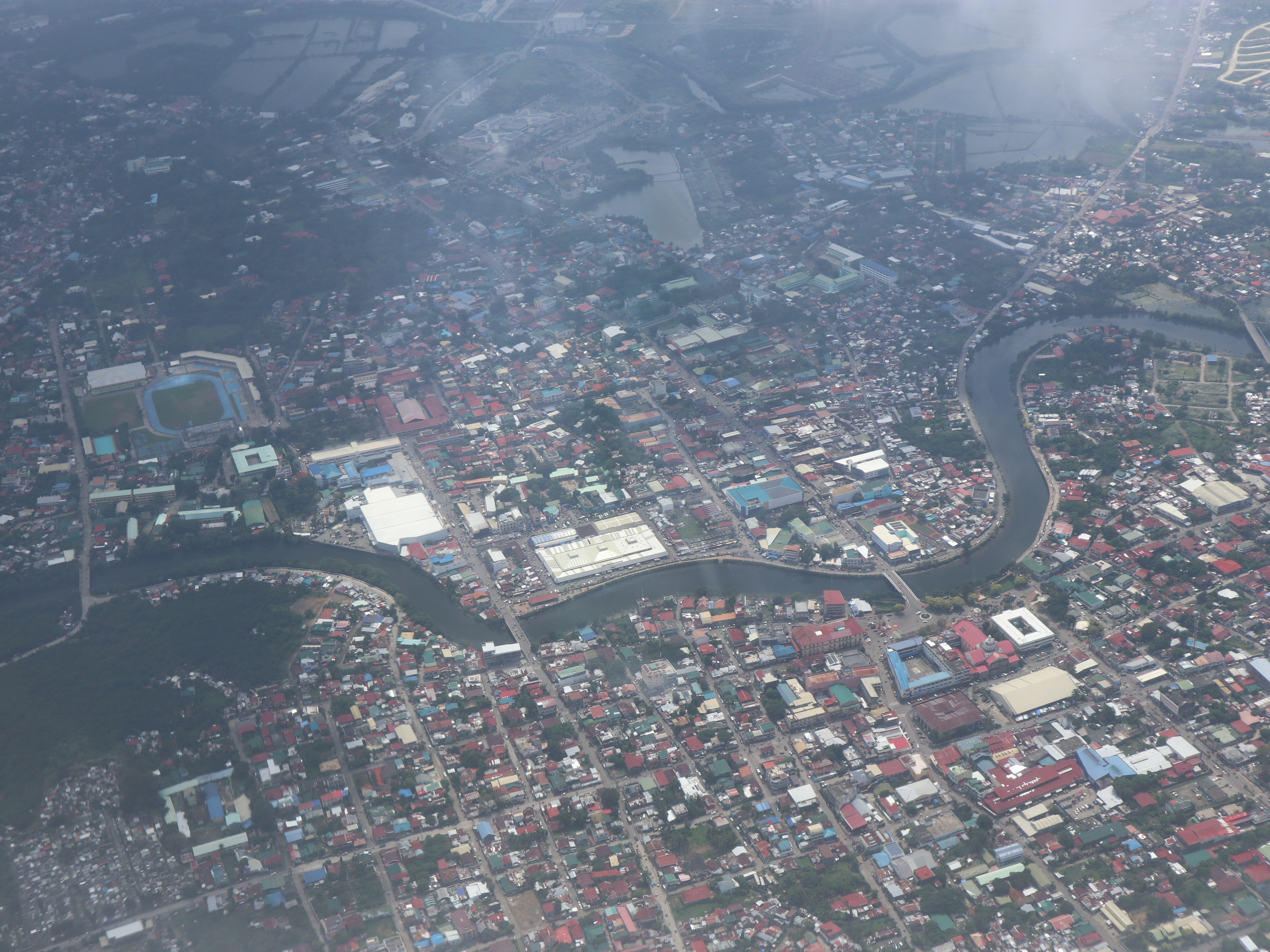
Aerial view of Roxas

Roxas City is situated just east of the north-central coast of Panay Island with geographic coordinates of 11°35' N, 122°45' E. Its boundaries are: the Sibuyan Sea to the north, the municipality of Panitan to the south, the municipality of Ivisan to the west, and the municipality of Panay to the east. It is located 116 kilometres (72 mi) north of Iloilo City, 86 kilometres (53 mi) from Kalibo, 213 kilometres (132 mi) from San Jose de Buenavista and 250 nautical miles (460 km) southeast of Manila. Travel time from/to Iloilo City takes 2 hours by land, while travel time from/to Manila is 50 minutes by air and 18 hours by sea.

=== Climate ===
Climate data for Roxas (1991–2020, extremes 1903–2023)
Month	Jan	Feb	Mar	Apr	May	Jun	Jul	Aug	Sep	Oct	Nov	Dec	Year
Record high °C (°F)	33.1 (91.6)	34.4 (93.9)	35.3 (95.5)	36.8 (98.2)	38.1 (100.6)	37.8 (100.0)	37.0 (98.6)	36.9 (98.4)	37.6 (99.7)	36.1 (97.0)	35.6 (96.1)	35.5 (95.9)	38.1 (100.6)
Mean daily maximum °C (°F)	28.9 (84.0)	29.3 (84.7)	30.3 (86.5)	31.6 (88.9)	32.4 (90.3)	31.9 (89.4)	31.4 (88.5)	31.5 (88.7)	31.5 (88.7)	31.0 (87.8)	30.7 (87.3)	29.6 (85.3)	30.9 (87.6)
Daily mean °C (°F)	26.9 (80.4)	27.1 (80.8)	27.8 (82.0)	28.8 (83.8)	29.1 (84.4)	28.7 (83.7)	28.3 (82.9)	28.4 (83.1)	28.3 (82.9)	28.1 (82.6)	28.1 (82.6)	27.4 (81.3)	28.1 (82.6)
Mean daily minimum °C (°F)	24.8 (76.6)	24.8 (76.6)	25.2 (77.4)	25.9 (78.6)	25.9 (78.6)	25.5 (77.9)	25.2 (77.4)	25.2 (77.4)	25.1 (77.2)	25.2 (77.4)	25.6 (78.1)	25.2 (77.4)	25.3 (77.5)
Record low °C (°F)	16.4 (61.5)	17.4 (63.3)	18.6 (65.5)	20.0 (68.0)	20.3 (68.5)	16.7 (62.1)	16.5 (61.7)	19.0 (66.2)	18.5 (65.3)	19.0 (66.2)	19.0 (66.2)	17.5 (63.5)	16.4 (61.5)
Average rainfall mm (inches)	83.6 (3.29)	63.1 (2.48)	62.3 (2.45)	65.1 (2.56)	142.1 (5.59)	283.9 (11.18)	274.4 (10.80)	197.6 (7.78)	219.2 (8.63)	305.1 (12.01)	212.9 (8.38)	227.7 (8.96)	2,137 (84.13)
Average rainy days (≥ 1 mm)	11	8	7	5	9	15	17	13	14	17	14	15	145
Average relative humidity (%)	84	83	81	80	80	82	83	83	83	83	83	84	82
Source: PAGASA

=== Barangays ===
The city of Roxas is politically subdivided into 47 barangays. Each barangay consists of puroks and some have sitios.

Currently, there are 31 barangays which considered urban and the rest are rural.

- Adlawan
- Bago
- Balijuagan
- Banica
- Barangay 1
- Barangay 2
- Barangay 3
- Barangay 4
- Barangay 5
- Barangay 6
- Barangay 7
- Barangay 8
- Barangay 9
- Barangay 10
- Barangay 11
- Barra
- Bato
- Baybay
- Bolo
- Cabugao
- Cagay
- Cogon
- Culajao
- Culasi
- Dumolog
- Dayao
- Dinginan
- Gabu-an
- Inzo Arnaldo Village (Cadimahan)
- Jumaguicjic
- Lanot
- Lawa-an
- Li-ong
- Libas
- Loctugan
- Lonoy
- Milibili
- Mongpong
- Olotayan
- Punta Cogon
- Punta Tabuc
- San Jose
- Sibaguan
- Talon
- Tanque
- Tanza
- Tiza

== Demographics ==
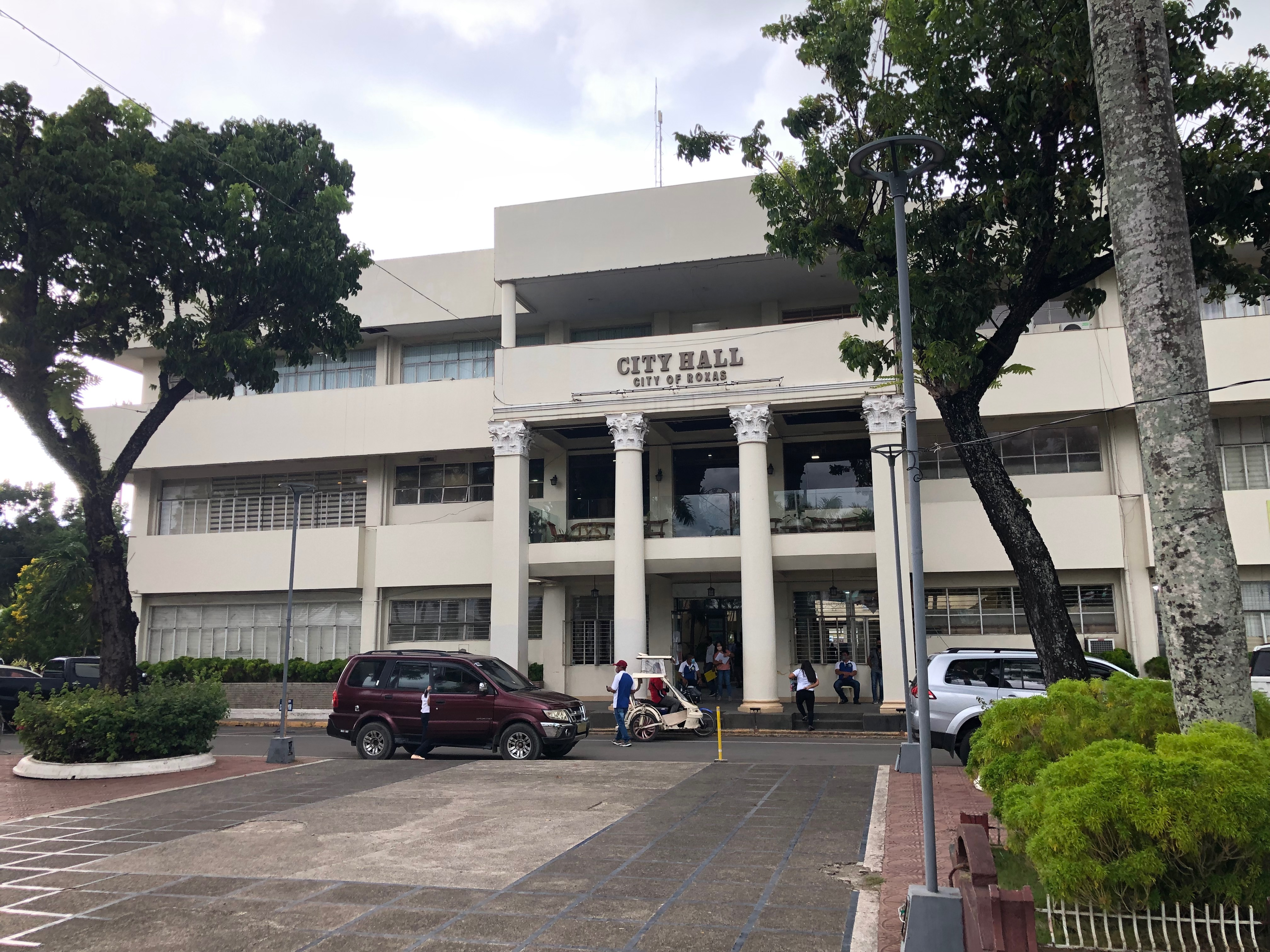
Roxas City Hall

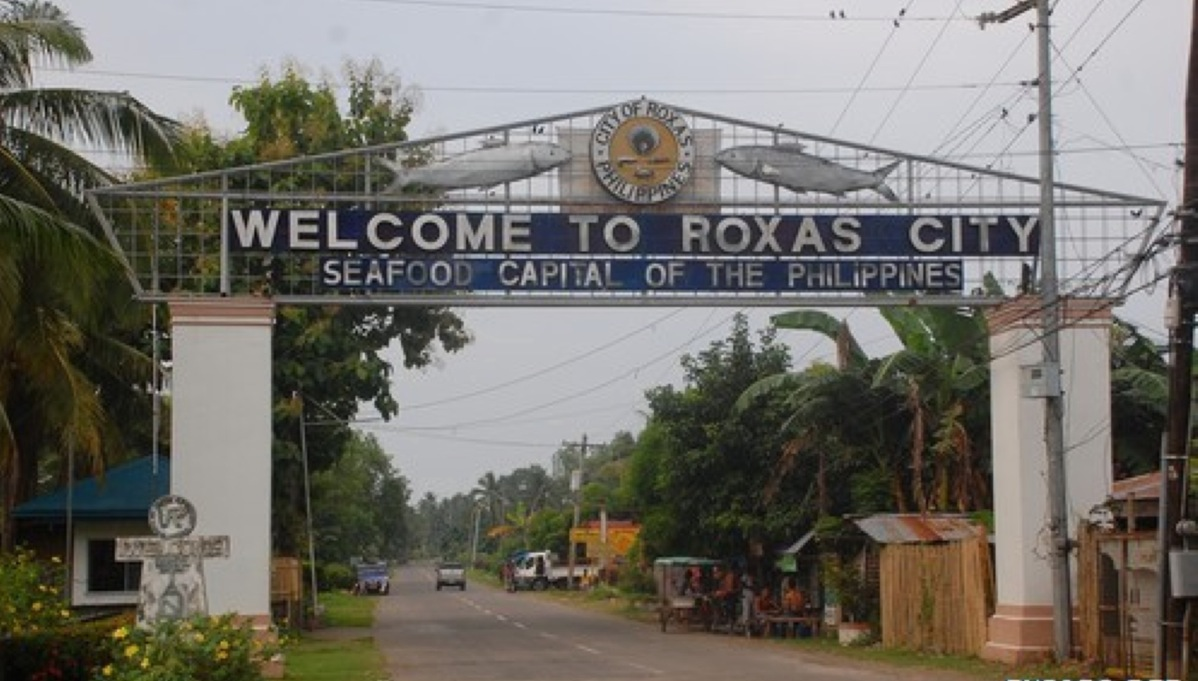
Welcome arch to Roxas City

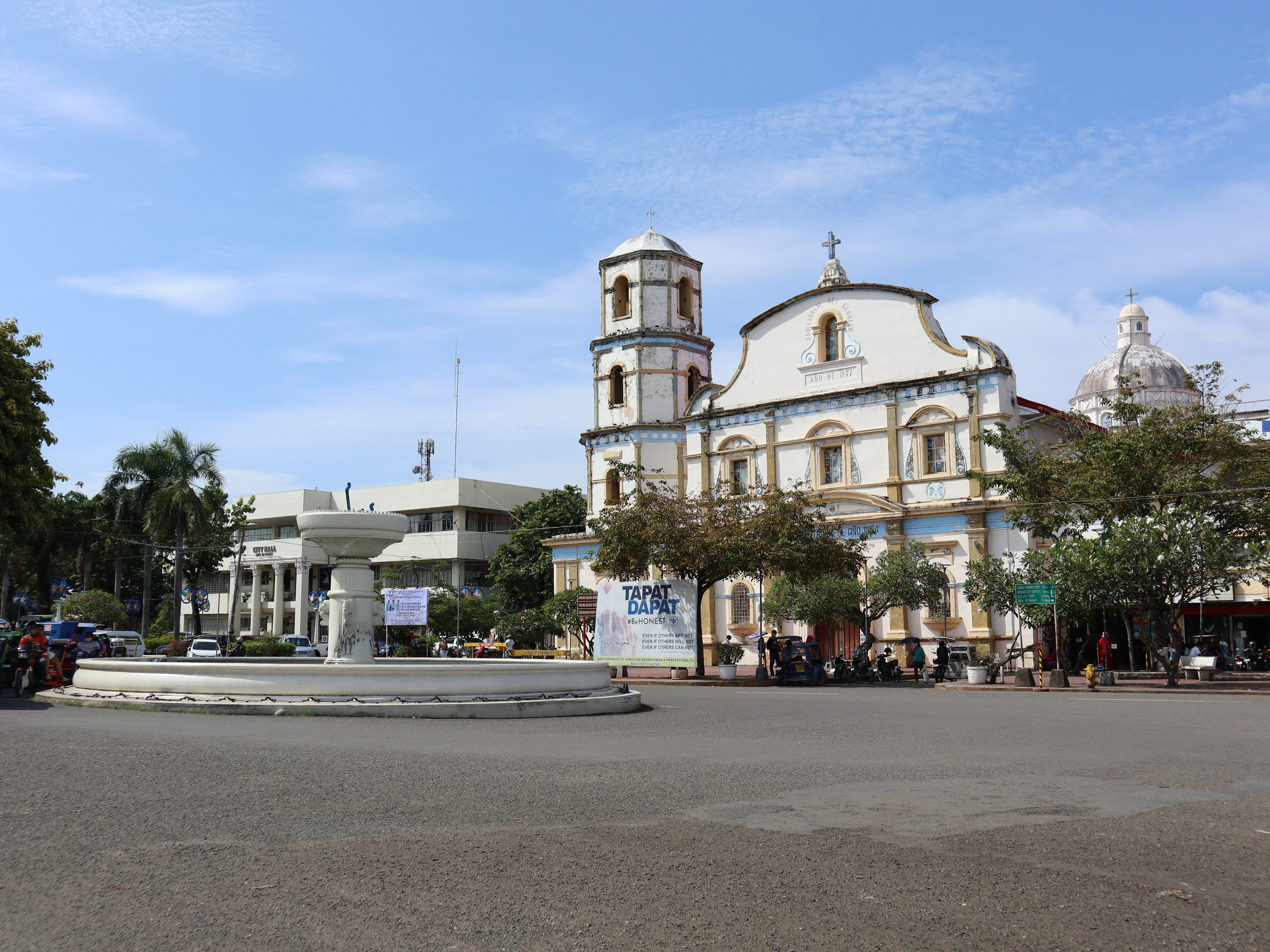
Roxas City Center, with a fountain and rotund in the foreground and Immaculate Conception church & belfry in the background

Population census of Roxas City
Year	Pop.	±% p.a.
1903	21,472	—
1918	22,022	+0.17%
1939	29,021	+1.32%
1948	32,353	+1.21%
1960	49,326	+3.58%
1970	67,648	+3.21%
1975	71,305	+1.06%
1980	81,183	+2.63%
1990	103,171	+2.43%
1995	118,715	+2.66%
2000	126,352	+1.35%
2007	147,738	+2.18%
2010	156,197	+2.05%
2015	167,003	+1.28%
2020	179,292	+1.51%
2024	185,236	+0.79%
Source: Philippine Statistics Authority

In the 2024 census, the population of Roxas City was 185,236 people, with a density of 1,900 inhabitants per square kilometre or 4,900 inhabitants per square mile.

=== Language ===
Languages spoken in Roxas City are Capiznon, Hiligaynon, English, and Tagalog.

== Economy ==
Poverty incidence of Roxas City (%)

Source: Philippine Statistics Authority

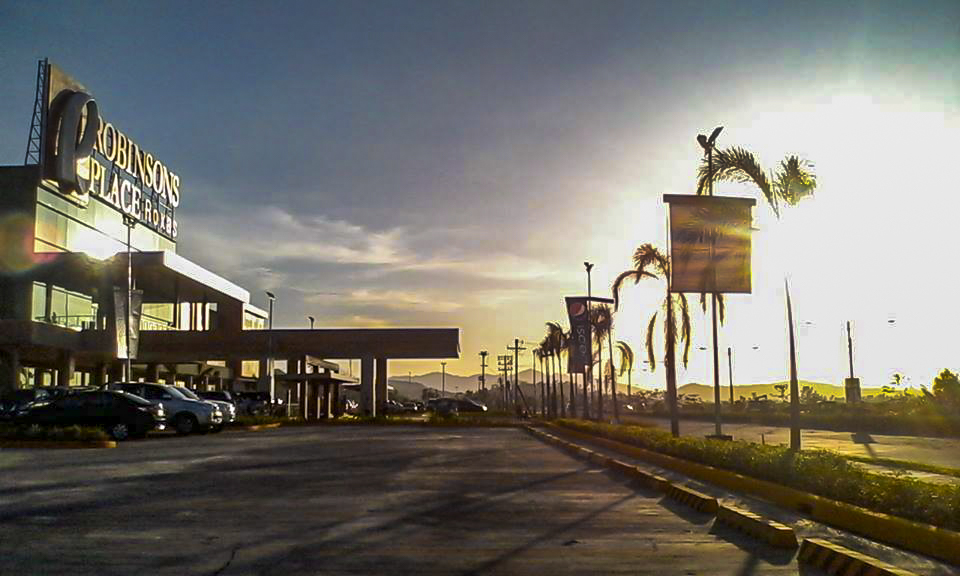
Robinsons Place Roxas

Roxas City is one of the selected Digital Cities 2025 by the I.T. and Business Process Association of the Philippines (IBPAP) in partnership with the Department of Information and Communications Technology (DICT) and the National ICT Confederation of the Philippines (NICP).

The city gets its power from the Capiz Electric Cooperative (CAPELCO). The Metro Roxas Water District (MRWD) supplies drinking water to the populace, MRWD claims they have the cleanest and safest potable water in the region. Supplementing the water supplied by Metro Roxas Water District (MRWD) are wells with hand pumps and artesian wells which are constructed through the Barangay Water Program (BWP) and Department of Public Works and Highways (DPWH).

The city's urban area now expanded to the southern part primarily on the site of the 670 hectares (1,700 acres) master-planned city within a city, Pueblo de Panay, which aims to build a new business district between Lawaan and Sibaguan highways. It is now occupied by several restaurants and hotels, 40 metres (130 ft) high Sacred Heart of Jesus (Roxas, Capiz) shrine (the tallest in the Philippines), Sitio Uno by Pueblo Residences (Roxas City's first condominium), and the 37,500 m^{2} (404,000 sq ft) Robinsons Place Roxas. The Pueblo de Panay Technopark will house international and national BPO companies such as ePerformax Contact Centers and BPO.

Nearby the decade-old Gaisano Grand Roxas is the location of the first of the many CityMalls of DoubleDragon Properties and SM Prime Holdings. Roxas City is experiencing a "real estate boom" due to rapid conversions of fishponds into subdivisions and commercial areas.

The National Port of Culasi and Roxas Airport serve as the main gateway to the city from the capital city of Manila. Philippine Airlines and Cebu Pacific has a daily flight to/from the capital city, Manila. The M/V Love-1 of Moreta Shipping Lines provides shipping going to Manila North Harbor and The Super Shuttle RoRo and 2GO Travel links Culasi to Batangas.

=== Agriculture ===
Roxas City has an agri-based economy. Farming and fishing are the major economic activities which claim 37.05% of the city's total land area. Although agricultural, the city is now moving towards commercialization and industrialization as it is the center of trade and commerce not only in the province of Capiz but also in the northern part of Panay Island. Rice and melons are the major crops grown in this area. Papaya and jackfruit trees are also cultivated.

=== Aquaculture (seafood production) ===
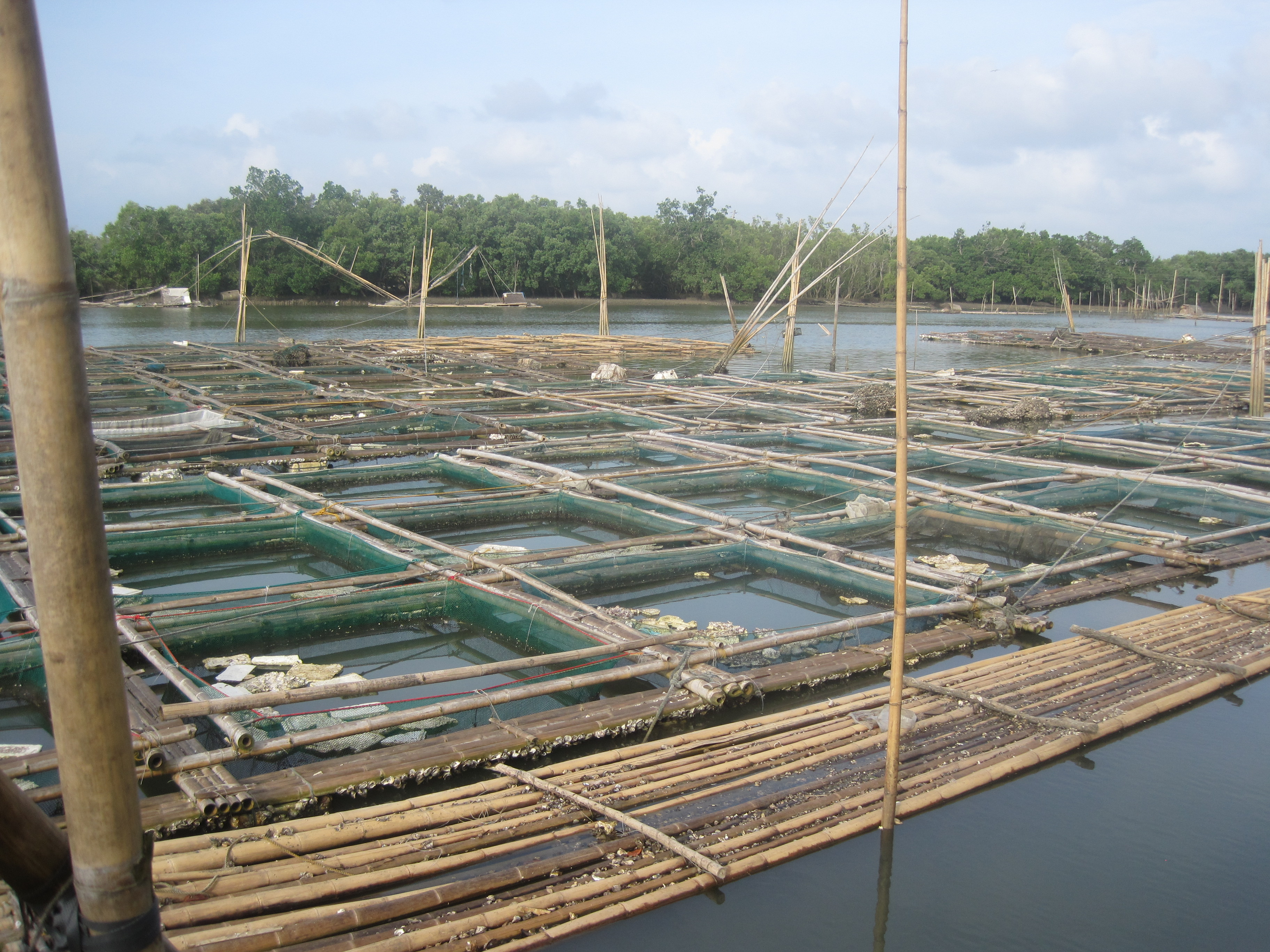
Fish cages in Roxas

Roxas City as Seafood capital of the Philippines exporting seafood products to various countries such as Taiwan, Japan and the United States. Phillips Seafood Philippines Corporation is the sole seafood production company with processing plant located in Banica, Roxas City. The main aquaculture farms are oyster and milk fish farms that take advantage of natural tidal bays and other low-lying areas near the coast.

=== Banking ===
More than 45 banks, including a branch of Bangko Sentral ng Pilipinas, are operating in the city.

=== Malls in the City ===
There are 7 malls located in Roxas City, includes SM City, Robinsons, Gaisano Grand & Marketplace, Citymalls (Arnaldo Blvd. & Roxas Avenue) & Unitop Shopping Mall.

=== Business process outsourcing ===
PETRA Academy is a non-voice outsourcing company that serves Korean nationals for an online English tutorial. The company is located in 3/F JC TIU Building, Corner Burgos Street and Inzo Arnaldo, Roxas City.

ePerformax Contact Center and BPO is the largest BPO company in Capiz and Northern Panay, ePerformax Contact Center and BPO - Roxas City opened last June 15, 2018, with over 1,000 employees as of 2020 and is targeting to reach 3,000 employees by 2022. It is located in PEZA-approved 7.4 hectares Pueblo de Panay Technopark inside 670-hectare Pueblo de Panay township. ePerformax Contact Center and BPO has also branches in Metro Manila and Cebu.

Xilium is located in Capiz Government and Business Center. It is a home-grown BPO company from Iloilo City, Philippines. It was founded in 2011. The company has grown steadily from a 5-person startup to a full-scale organization with more than 100 employees and a second branch in Roxas City, Capiz.

== Infrastructure ==
=== Public transport ===
Roxas City is served mostly by passenger jeepneys, metered taxis and motorized tricycle within the city limits.

The Capiz Cabs (metered taxis) of Roxas City are made of SUV type and can carry seven maximum passengers and serve to any point of Panay Island. Most of them are designed in colorful packaging and can be seen all the time in Roxas Airport.

The Pueblo de Panay Libot Vehicles are new additions to the transportation system primarily within Pueblo de Panay. These vehicles are customized Isuzu NHR Trucks and are bigger than the usual passenger jeepneys.

=== Transport terminals ===
Roxas City has two Transport Terminals located at the city's perimeter areas, these are:

Roxas City Integrated Terminal located at the Pueblo de Panay in Lawaan is the transport hub serving passengers to/from the provinces of Aklan and Iloilo and roll on-roll off (RORO) buses plying Roxas-Manila(Cubao). The Php 50 million newly erected integrated terminal was done thru PPP by the LGU and Pueblo de Panay Inc.

Roxas City Eastern Terminal located in Banica, Roxas City is the transport hub serving passengers to/from the province of Iloilo.

=== Railroad ===
From 1907 to 1989, Panay Railways operated a railroad from Roxas City to the port area of Muelle Loney along the Iloilo River in Iloilo City. A revival of Panay Railways has been approved by the Regional Development Council - Region VI and is currently under feasibility study.

=== Roxas Airport ===
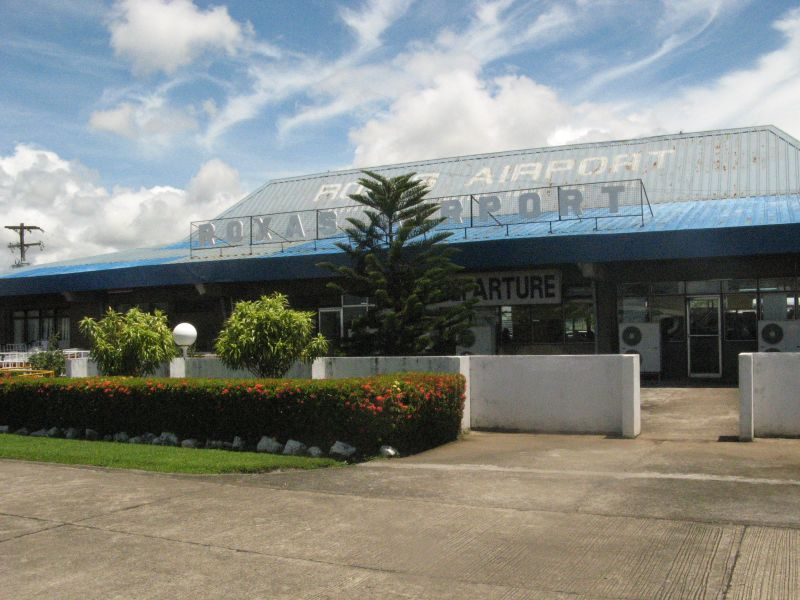
Roxas Airport

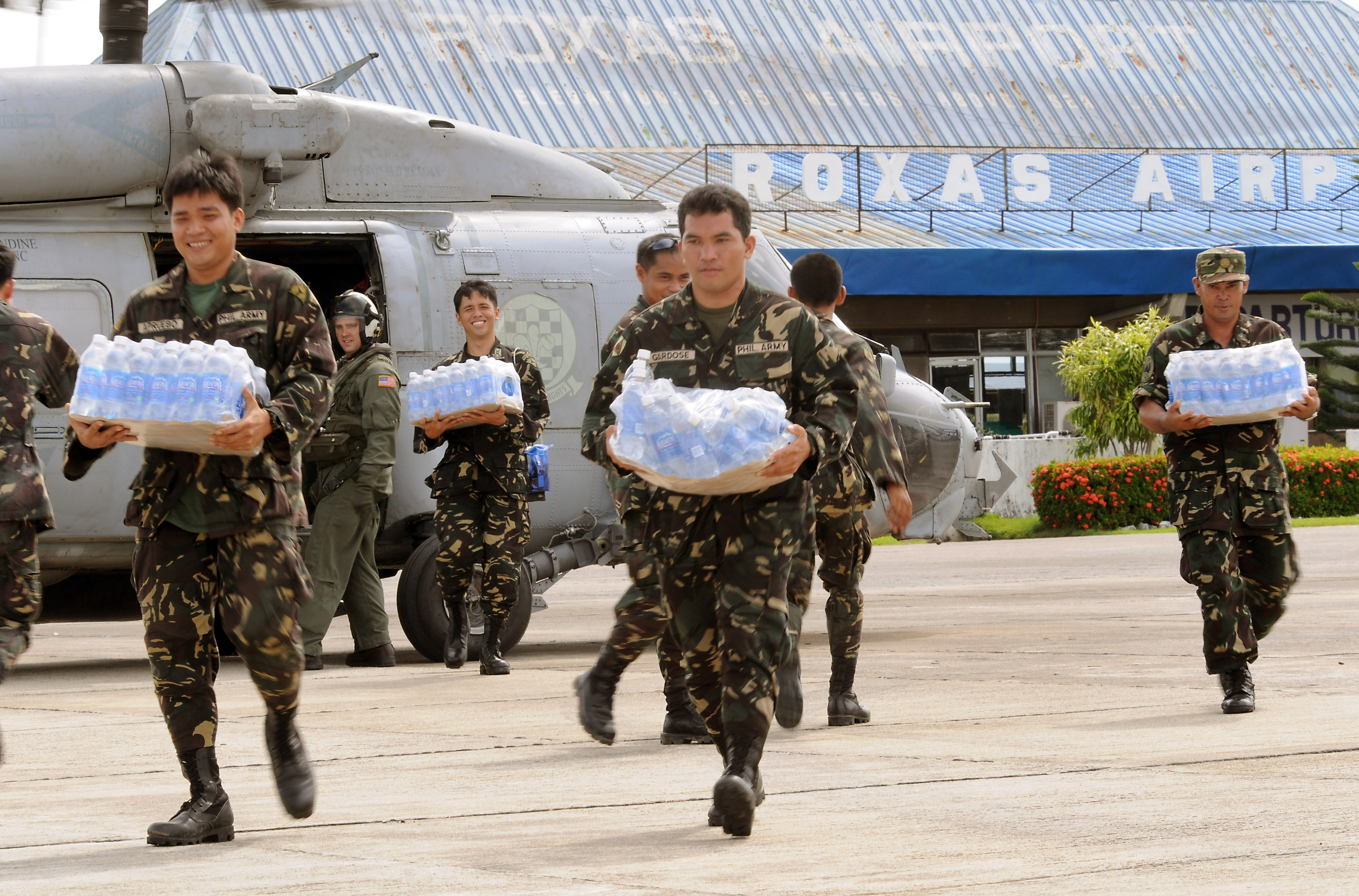
Philippine Army Servicemen at the Roxas Airport

Roxas Airport (RXS) is an airport serving the general area of Roxas City, the entire province of Capiz, and Northern Iloilo in the Philippines. The airport is classified as a Class 1 principal airport by the Civil Aviation Authority of the Philippines.

In 2013, the national government has approved the Php 215 million budget for the expansion of the Roxas Airport including installation of night landing facilities.

Roxas Airport has three-four daily flight bound to Manila, three flights by Cebu Pacific and one flight by Philippine Airlines and Air Asia.

=== Port of Culasi ===
The Port of Culasi is the port serving the entire area of Roxas City and the gateway port of Northern Panay. This port is the trading and shipping center during the Spanish Colonialism. Currently, it has routes from Roxas City to Romblon, Sibuyan, Dumaguit, Cadiz, Estancia, Carles, Batangas and Manila. The Philippine Coast Guard-Roxas and the 1st Search and Rescue Hub of the PCG and a mini-hospital are also located here. In 1926, Culasi Port was built by the construction firm Pedro Siochi and Company to serve as trans-shipment point for inter-island vessel that carries vital products for the people living in Capiz, and its neighboring provinces such as Aklan and Northern Iloilo as well.

Currently, 2 RORO vessels are operating the port namely: 2GO Travel and Starlite Ferries both are bound to Batangas.

=== Domestic seaports and Fishing (marine) port facilities ===
The Port of Libas or Libas Fishing Port, provides anchorage to fishing vessel; and serves as center for trade of marine products in the province.

The Port of Banica, serves as a trading route from Roxas City to different parts of Masbate Island. This wharf is said to be the site where Captain Diego de Artieda who was sent by Miguel Lopez de Legazpi from Cebu landed in 1569.

=== Communication ===
Available communication services in Roxas City are: telephone services including domestic and international direct dial, facsimile; mobile communications, internet, telegraph and telex stations, post offices and other messengerial and courier services.

There are three telephone Service provider in Roxas City providing landline connections to almost all of the municipalities. These are: Philippine Long Distance Telephone Company, INNOVE (Globe Telecom) and Bayan Telecommunications.

Cellular telephone facilities are also provided by three cellular companies namely Smart Communications, Globe Telecom and Dito Telecommunity.

=== Convention facilities ===
El Circulo Convention Center, the Mediterranean-inspired convention center is the latest infrastructure of Pueblo de Panay. The convention center hosts wedding and other important events. Pueblo de Panay proposes to add resorts and hotels near the convention center by 2017. Currently, it houses the University of the Philippines Visayas College of Management – Master of Management Program Roxas Extension and holds classes every Saturday.

Gerry Roxas Foundation Resource Center at the Roxas City Center, serves as host of several symposia, meetings, and convention for government sectors.

CAP Auditorium, owned by College Assurance Plan also hosts major events such as national, regional and local conventions and serves as a venue for cultural presentations and educational events.

Other big venues in Roxas City that can accommodate International and National gatherings are the Capis Mansion Ballroom at Banica, the Main Hall at La Hacienda Hotel and MVW Restaurant and Hotel.

=== Sports venues and stadium ===
Villareal Stadium - is the biggest stadium in Western Visayas. Built in 1962, the 20,000 seating capacity stadium has an Olympic-sized swimming pool, A 6,000 capacity gym Called (Capiz Gymnasium), rubberized oval and paved tennis, volleyball, football and basketball courts. The 10-hectare sports complex has become the official venue of various events aside from sports such as the 2nd Annual One Visayas Festival in 2010. It has also become a major forerunner in promoting sports tourism in the province of Capiz. The sports complex had hosted the Palarong Pambansa in 1963, Philippine University Games (Unigames) in 2011 and numerous WVRAA and WVPRISAA events.

Dinggoy Roxas Civic Center - the civic center has 5,000 seating capacity and a host for Regional and Local basketball sports events like WVRAA, WVPRISAA and Intercollegiate basketball leagues in the city. The civic center usually serves as the venue for Mutya sa Sinadya sang Halaran beauty pageant.

Capiz Gymnasium - this gym has 6,000 seating capacity and has been a host of several sports events such as Philippine Basketball Association (PBA), WVRAA, WVPRISAA, Unigames, etc. The gymnasium serves also a venue for various National, Regional, and Local events.

=== New road networks ===
The Roxas City Government, thru the Capiz Provincial Government, identified Roxas City Circumferential Road as one of their priority projects. Roxas City Circumferential Road would serve as a by-pass road for traffic of goods and passengers going to and from Culasi Port and Panay town and the adjoining northeastern towns of Capiz, without passing thru the central business area of Roxas City. The Roxas City Circumferential Road is one of four road projects being proposed by DPWH VI under the Panay Roads Investment Development (PRIDE) to be funded by the Japan Bank of International Cooperation. Although most of the construction on the road projects is done by hand. Many of the road projects are politically motivated and cause undo stress and burden on the locals who live alongside the major roads. Some locals have lost there property to the government in road projects with little to no compensation.

Roxas City Circumferential Road is divided into two sections:

Section I starts at the Culasi Port and passing at the side of Cadimahan River, crosses the said river wherein two bridges will be constructed. Section II starts at the junction of the Ivisan-Roxas National Road and eventually joins the national highway going to Panay and Pontevedra towns.

Pueblo de Panay Road Network - a four-lane to six-lane high impact roads connecting the national highway in Lawaan to the highways in Brgys. Dinginan and Sibaguan.

The Health Centrum Complex Road Network - newly access roads developed by the Health Centrum Inc. to connect direct access from the main highway of Banica to the complex recently. The roads are also connected to the bridge that connects Tiza and Banica.

== Plazas and public parks ==
=== Capiz Provincial Park ===
This landmark is located within Barangay Tiza, Roxas City, fronting the Capiz National High School. The park features pocket gardens, three monuments representing the culture diversity of Roxas City, a turtle-shape outdoor theater and an outdoor platform.

=== Roxas City Plaza/Halaran Plaza ===
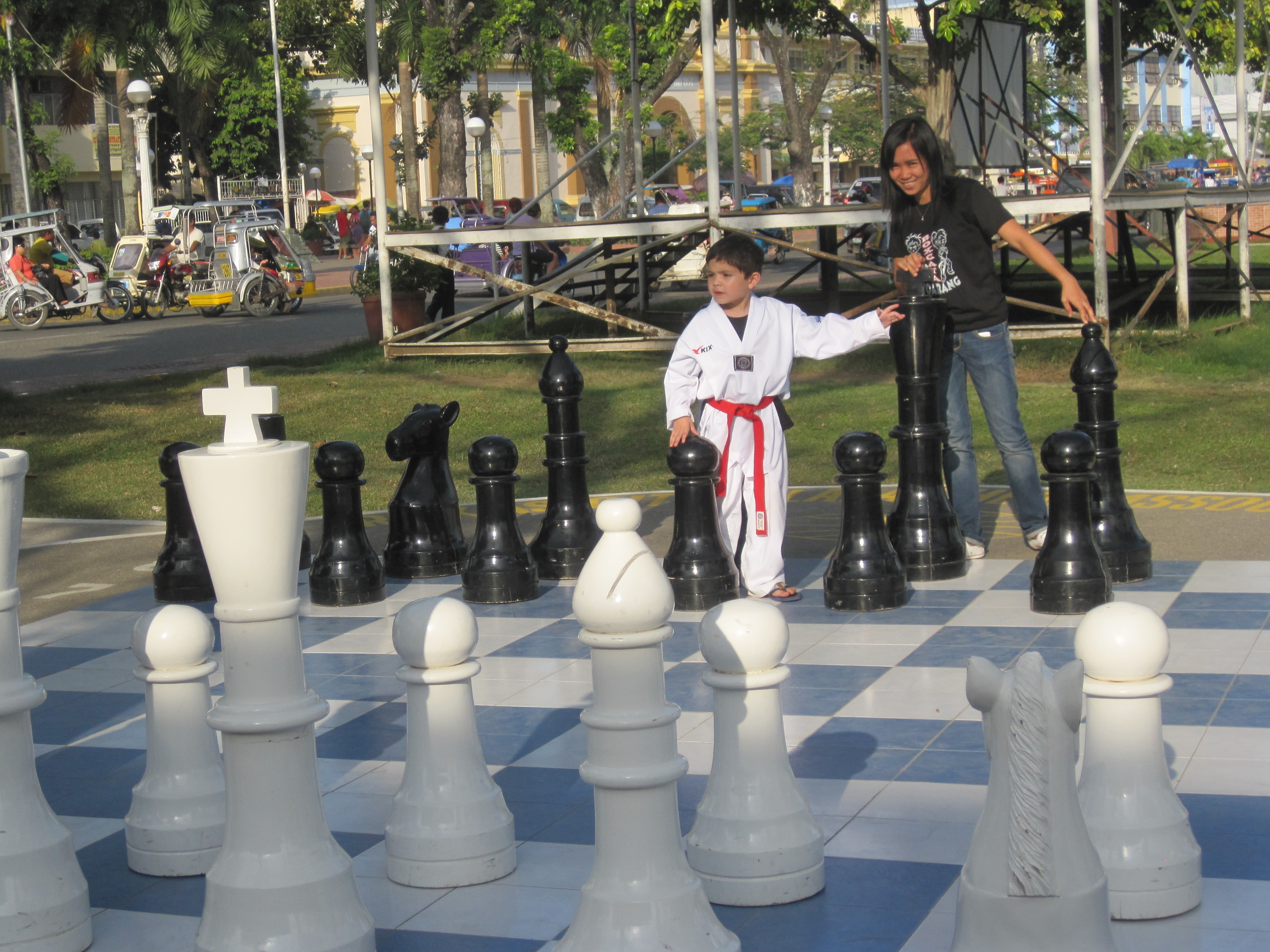
Roxas chess plaza

Located at the heart of the city, this park has two divisions. The first division lies near the Panay River banks. It houses a famous landmark (Roxas City Bandstand), where it is the exact location were signing of MOA, chartering Municipality of Capiz into City of Roxas. At the right-end of the first division, stands the life-size chess plaza.

The second division of Roxas City Plaza faces the right side of Roxas City Hall. It has several pine trees, but after the ravaging Super Typhoon Yolanda hit the Seafood Capital of the Philippines, several trees were uprooted and only few are currently existing. Travelers can visit Manuel A. Roxas Monument in this park. The monument faces with Jose Rizal Monument at the far-end of the Capitol. Few steps from M.A.Roxas monument is the only water-tank turned into Museum in the Philippines. The Panublion Museum serves as the "Story Teller" of Roxas City's History.

=== La Playa de Roxas People's Park ===
This public park is situated at Barangay Baybay, Roxas City. It faces the Sibuyan Sea and the scenic coastline of Northern Panay. At the left-end of the Park showcases the colorful dancing fountain. There is a beach that people swim at and the park has grass area and security both. The park also has cheap street food and a children's playground. At the right-end of the park is the kapis shells-inspired Seafood Court, where the city's marine products are served.

== Healthcare ==
Roxas City is gearing up toward a medical-hub in Northern Panay as several hospitals and health institutions are upgrading. Currently, the city has one government-owned hospital with two sites and four private hospitals. Through the aid of public empowerment, City of Roxas took off its landfall in the Hall of Famer for Red Orchid (Smoke Free City) in the Philippines. With the partnership of Private and Government sectors, several health propaganda were established to strengthen the health care delivery system.

1. Capiz Emmanuel Hospital (Filamer Christian University - Capiz Emmanuel Hospital), founded by the American Baptist Mission in Capiz. Dr. Frederick Meyer, a former administrator of the hospital, also wrote the early history of Capiz. This 100-bed capacity tertiary hospital was founded in 1908. Capiz Emmanuel Hospital is the first Baptist hospital in the Philippines. It is affiliated with Filamer Christian University.
2. Saint Anthony College Hospital of Roxas City, The 135-bed capacity was founded in June 1956 by Mr. and Mrs. Pio Bernas who, having realized the need for more health care facilities in Roxas City and in Capiz, initiated the project with the help of Dr. Gaudencio Ortañez.
3. Roxas Memorial Provincial (General) Hospital, The 150-bed capacity public hospital is moving to Capitol Hills, Lanot, Roxas City. The new 300-bed capacity hospital is currently under-construction while the OPD is already completed.
4. Capiz Doctors' Hospital is in Water Village, Lawaan, Roxas City. The facility is a 100-bed capacity hospital.
5. The Health Centrum Hospital and Wellness Center is a 40-bed capacity level 2 hospital and is open for expansion in the future.

== Education ==
Roxas City is considered as the center of Education in Northern Panay. The city hosts 4 universities and various colleges.

=== Universities ===
The city has one national (program extension) university, one state university, one private university, and one satellite campus of a private university.

- Capiz State University - Roxas City Main Campus
  - Capiz State University - Dayao Satellite College
- Filamer Christian University - Roxas Avenue, Roxas City
- University of the Philippines Visayas (Master of Management Program Roxas Extension) - Pueblo de Panay, Lawaan, Roxas City
- University of Perpetual Help System - Pueblo de Panay, Lawaan, Roxas City

=== Colleges ===
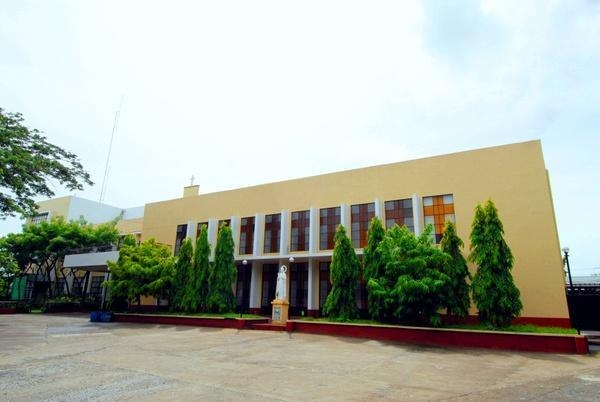
St. Pius X Seminary

- Advanced Specialty Learning Academy Inc. - Roxas
- Colegio de la Purisima Concepcion (CPC) - Main Campus
  - Colegio de la Purisima Concepcion (CPC) - Annex Campus
  - Colegio de la Purisima Concepcion (CPC) - Calipayan Campus
- Capiz Institute of Electronics
- College of St. John-Roxas
- Dean Alberto Villarruz College (formerly STI College-Roxas (VILL-NET INC.))
- Hercor College - Main Campus
- Hercor College - Riverside Campus
- Mayhekz Culinary Arts and Restaurant Services Institute (MCARSI)
- Lifegoal International Institute
- PACE Computer College
- Sancta Maria, Mater et Regina, Seminarium
- St. Anthony College of Nursing
- St. Pius X Seminary
- Western Trade Institute of Technology

== Festivals ==
=== Sinadya Sa Halaran ===
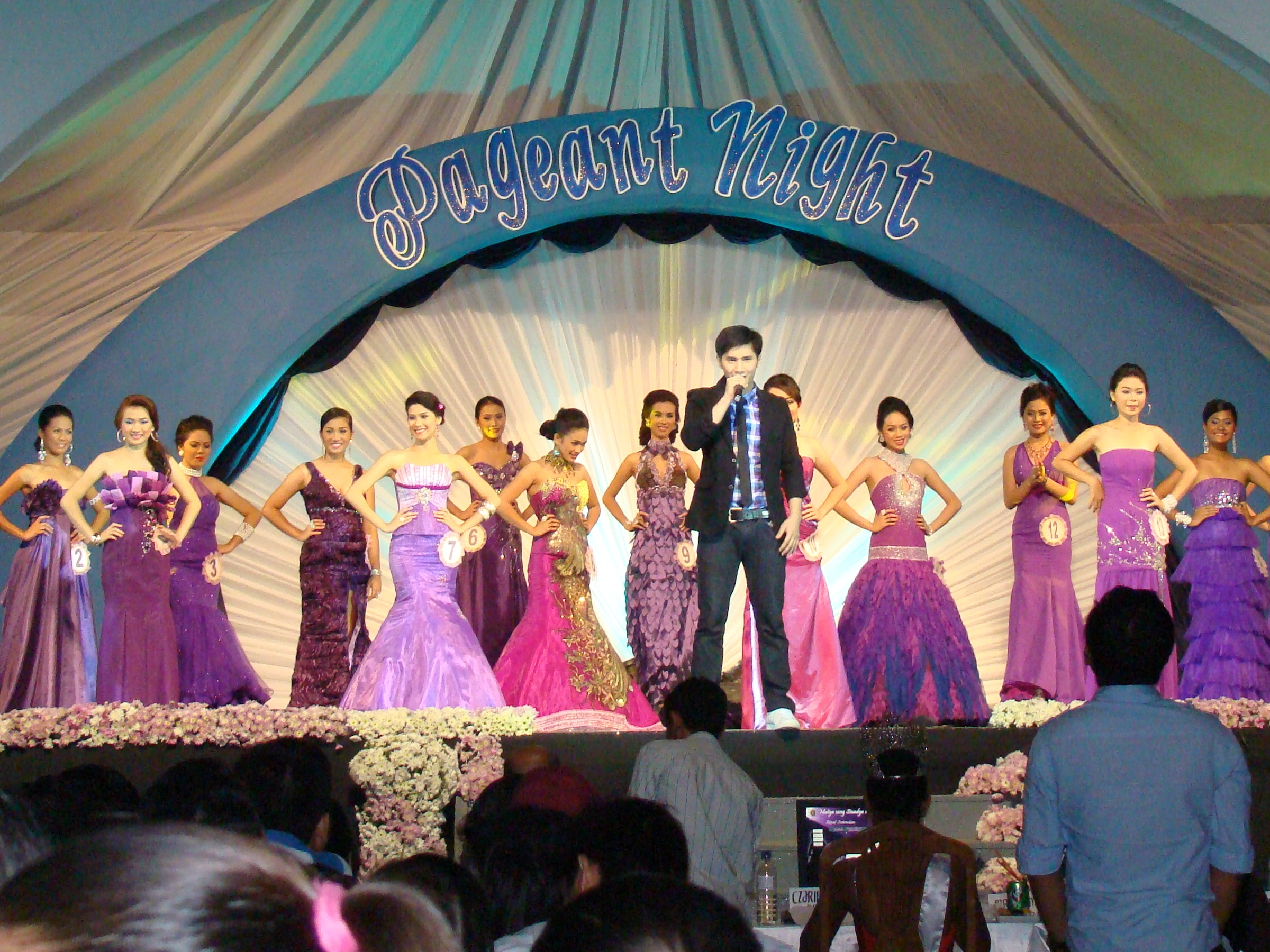
Roxas City Sinadya sa Halaran Beauty Pageant 2010

The Sinadya sa Halaran Festival is celebrated the first week of December in commemoration of the founding of the city followed by the Diwal Festival signifying the city's importance as the country's "Seafood Capital" along with the Aswang Festival that symbolizes the heritage of myth and folklore in the province. But it is now discontinued.

There used to be two separate festivals, the Halaran ("Offering") and the Sinadya ("Celebration"), the former is celebrated by the Province of Capiz and the latter by the City of Roxas. The Sinadya was formerly held at the same time as the Feast of the Immaculate Conception, which was celebrated by the Immaculate Conception Metropolitan Cathedral. The Halaran was usually held by the last week of October each year (A prelude to All Souls Day and All Saints Day festivals). However, because of the costs of holding two separate festivals year, the two festivals were merged, with both the Province of Capiz and the City of Roxas contributing to the expenses.

The festival was held virtually during 2020 and 2021 due to the COVID-19 pandemic, but returned to in-person events 2022.

=== Diwal Festival ===
The Roxas City Seafood Festival is held to commemorate and promote the resurgence of the Angel Wing or diwal, which neared extinction in Capiz until protected and cultivated in Roxas City.

=== Capiztahan Festival ===
The Capiztahan is celebrated every second week of April combined joint forces from City of Roxas, Province of Capiz and One Capiz..

== Notable personalities ==
=== Politics ===
- Pedro Gil, was a physician, journalist, and legislator. He was elected representative for the south District Manila on the Democratra party ticket. He became Minority Floor Leader in the House of Representatives of the Philippines.
- Manuel Roxas (1892–1948), first President of the independent Republic of the Philippines
- Gerardo Roxas (1924–1982), Philippine Senator and son of President Manuel Roxas
- Manuel Roxas II (born 1957), Philippine Senator, grandson of President Manuel Roxas and former Department of the Interior and Local Government secretary
- Gerardo Roxas Jr. (1960-1993), grandson of President Manuel Roxas and former Congressman

=== Business ===
- Edgar Sia, is the chairman of DoubleDragon Properties and the founder of Mang Inasal fast food restaurant chain

=== Entertainment ===
- Gina Alajar, actress and director
- Daisy Avellana (1917–2013), actress and theater director
- Sharmaine Arnaiz (born 1974), actress
- Paolo Bediones (born 1974), commercial model, television host, journalist, newscaster, and radio announcer
- Lloyd Samartino, actor

=== Sports ===
- Jeckster Apinan, a professional basketball player

=== Music ===
- Emil Mijares, was a jazz vibraphonist and pianist, and was a musical director on Filipino television, as well as a composer, arranger, bandleader and producer.
- Barbie Almalbis (born 1977), singer, former frontman of Hungry Young Poets and Barbie's Cradle.
- Mikoy Morales, is an actor, singer & model. He joined the Protégé: The Battle For The Big Artista Break.
- Jovita Fuentes, Dubbed the First Lady of Philippine Music. The first female recipient of the National Artist Award.

=== Social sciences ===
- Josepha Abiertas (1894–1929), feminist and lawyer who was born and raised in Capiz

== Sister cities ==
Roxas City has the following sister cities:

=== Local ===
- Quezon City, since March 2013

=== International ===
- (United States) San Bernardino, California, U.S.A.
- Guam, U.S.A.
- Balıkesir, Turkey

== See also ==
- List of renamed cities and municipalities in the Philippines
- Capiz
