= DGP =

DGP may refer to:

== Government and politics ==
- Director general of police, a police rank in India
- Democratic Progress Party, a right-wing political party in Turkey
- Deutsche Grenzpolizei, East German border guards
- Development guide plan, an urban plan of Singapore's Urban Redevelopment Authority

== Science and mathematics ==
- DGP gravity, in physics, a brane world model
- Data generating process, in statistics
- Dynamic Graphics Project, a computer science lab at the University of Toronto
- Daylight Glare Probability, in daylight study

== Other uses ==
- Digest Group Publications, an American game company
- Drawn, ground, and polished, a finishing process for metal shafting
- Daugavpils International Airport, IATA code DGP
