= TGP =

TGP may refer to:

- Taller de Gráfica Popular, an artist's print collective in Mexico
- Targeting pod, a device used by military aircraft for identifying targets and guiding precision-guided munitions such as laser-guided bombs to those targets
- TGP Partylist, a political organization in the Philippines
- The Gateway Pundit, an American far-right fake news website
- The Generics Pharmacy, a Philippine drugstore chain
- The Good Place, an American television series
- The Grocery People, a Canadian Grocery store co-operative
- Turned, ground, and polished, a finishing process for metal shafting
