= Ayala Malls Nuvali =

Shopping mall in Santa Rosa, Laguna, Philippines

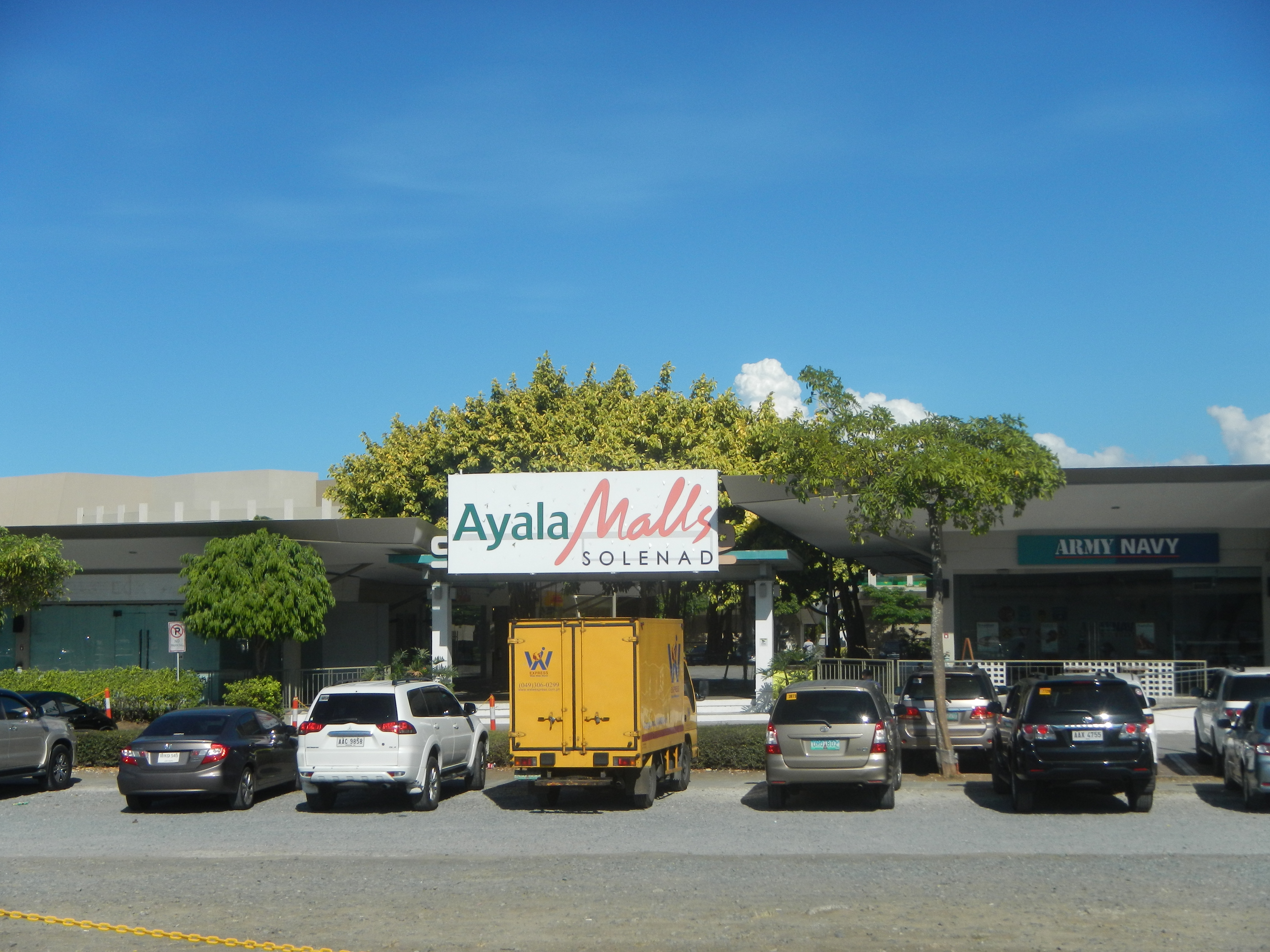
- Nuvali 2 in 2018, bearing the signage of then-Ayala Malls Solenad
- Coordinates: 14.23854°N 121.05756°E
- Address: Nuvali, Santa Rosa–Tagaytay Road, Barangay Santo Domingo, Santa Rosa, Laguna, Philippines
- Opened: April 26, 2009; 17 years ago
- Previous names: Solenad (2009–2015); Ayala Malls Solenad (2015–2025)
- Developer: Ayala Malls
- Manager: Ayala Malls
- Num. of stores: 550+ (expected estimate)
- Floor area: 100,000 m^{2} (1,100,000 sq ft)
- Floors: 1–5
- Parking: 1000+
- Website: https://www.ayalamalls.com/main/malls/ayala-solenad

Ayala Malls Nuvali, formerly known as Ayala Malls Solenad, is a shopping and lifestyle center located within the Nuvali eco-city estate in Santa Rosa, Laguna, Philippines. The mall is operated through Ayala Malls, a subsidiary of Ayala Land. Originally opened as Solenad in 2009, the mall expanded with Solenad 2 in 2011 and rebranded as an Ayala Mall when Solenad 3 opened in 2015. In 2024, it adopted its current name as part of its expansion that led to the opening of its fourth wing, Nuvali 4, in 2026.

== Etymology ==
Ayala Malls Nuvali is named after the estate where it is located. Its original name, Solenad, is a portmanteau of the Spanish or Latin word "sol" (sun) and "nad" from promenade.

== History ==
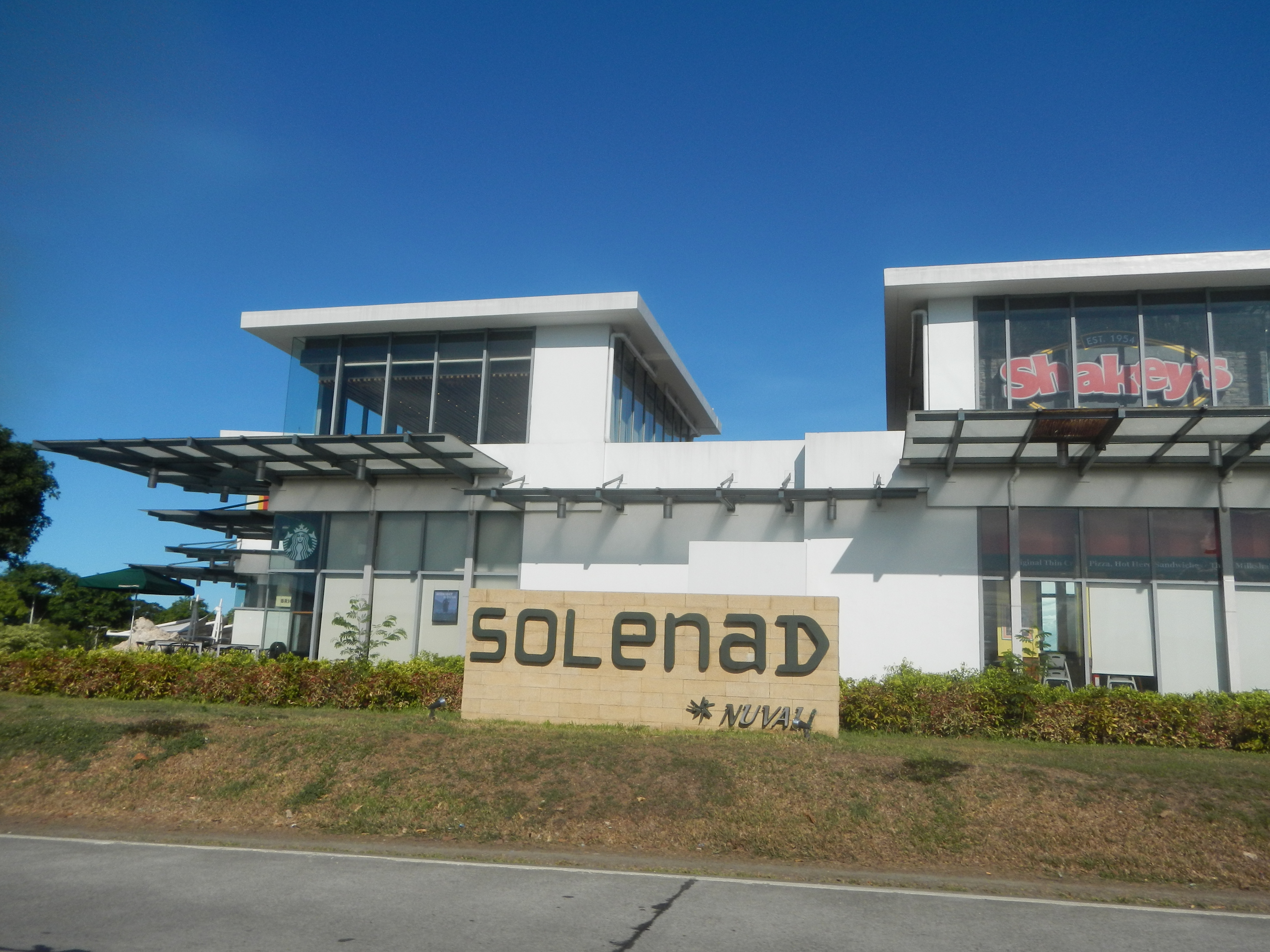
The mall traces its origin to Solenad (now Nuvali 1)

The mall traces its origin to Solenad, a lakeside commercial area at the northern entrance of Nuvali which opened when the estate was launched on April 26, 2009. It expanded across Nuvali Boulevard with the opening of Solenad 2 on July 29, 2011, which introduced a new branch of Robinsons Supermarket.

The mall was officially launched under the Ayala Malls portfolio as Ayala Malls Solenad on August 6, 2015, with the opening of the third wing initially called Solenad 3. The cinemas at Solenad 3 opened on November 18, 2015. In 2019, the first provincial branch of Landmark opened at Solenad 3. Its supermarket and food center opened on July 31, 2019, followed by the department store on October 25, 2019.

In 2024, an expansion project for the mall began, involving dismantling the Fiesta Market to make way for a multi-level steel parking structure (which opened in 2025), additional open-air parking spaces around Solenad 2, and the Nuvali 4 retail expansion. The expansion wing is built on the former sites of an open parking lot by Solenad 3 and parts of The Fields at Nuvali. The project adds almost 50,000 square meters (540,000 sq ft) of new retail space across two phases. The entire complex has since been rebranded as Ayala Malls Nuvali, gradually dropping the Solenad name. The Nuvali 4 retail expansion was opened on November 12, 2026.

== Features ==
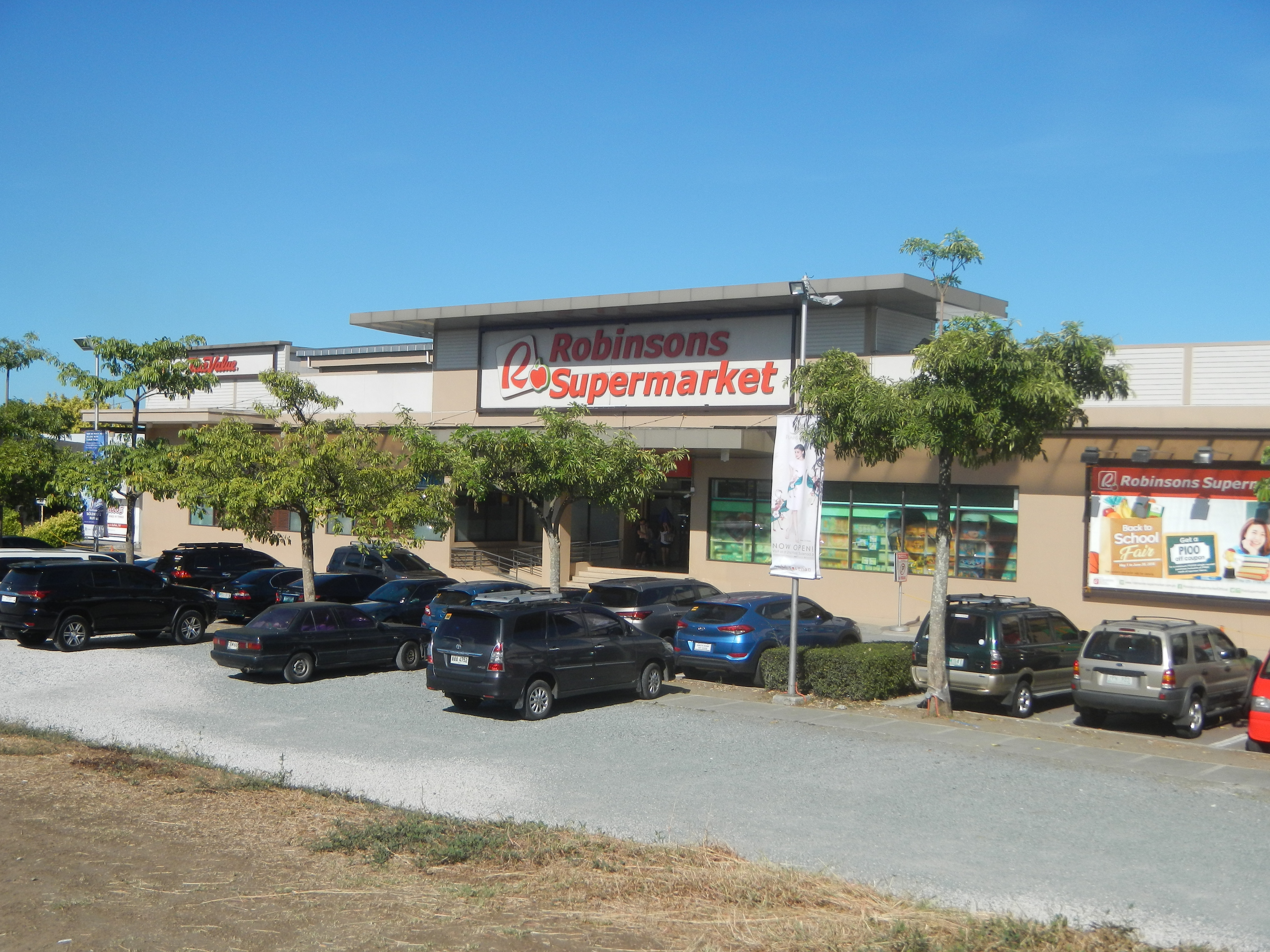
A Robinsons Supermarket branch at Nuvali 2

Ayala Malls Nuvali, located in Nuvali's Metro Nuvali central business district, is divided into four distinct wings. Nuvali 1 sits directly by the artificial Nuvali Lake, while Nuvali 2 to 4 are located across Nuvali Boulevard, alongside the Nuvali Transport Terminal. It has a total retail area of 7,000,000 square meters (75,000,000 sq ft) and a total retail area of 104,000 square meters (1,120,000 sq ft)}.

Nuvali 1 features an open-air layout composed of five two-storey buildings. Situated at the Nuvali Lakeside area, it offers recreational activities such as koi feeding and water taxi rides.

Nuvali 2 is a single-level wing further divided into four buildings. It is anchored by a Robinsons Supermarket branch.

Nuvali 3 is further divided into ten structures—Buildings A to H–with Building H split into three separate structures. Building A is occupied by a branch of The Landmark department store, supermarket, and food center, while a four-screen cinema, one of which is an A-Luxe cinema, is located on the third level of Building C. Buildings A and C stand at three levels each; Buildings B, D, and E have two each; and the rest are single-level structures featuring a restaurant row. Buildings A, C, and H are fully air-conditioned, while Building D contains an open-air central atrium. The wing also features a central activity park and playground. From 2015 to 2024, it included Fiesta Market, which featured a hawker center type of food court.

Nuvali 4 is a five-storey expansion wing of the mall. It has a total leasable area of 49,000 square meters (530,000 sq ft). It features a roof deck, a sky-lit atrium, the future Chapel of St. Padre Pio (a Roman Catholic chapel), and Troopers Food Hall, which will occupy two levels. The one-kilometer (0.62 mi) Nuvali Greenway, which features al fresco dining, connects Nuvali 4 to the rest of the mall.

=== Parking ===
Parking facilities serving the mall include open-air lots near Nuvali 1, around Nuvali 2, along Nuvali Boulevard, a separate multi-level steel parking building, and a multi-level parking inside Nuvali 4. Additionally, Nuvali 4 is also served by separate, adjacent open lots nearby.
