= Uncle John =

Uncle John may refer to:

- Uncle John (film), a 2015 American thriller film
- Uncle John's (store), a Philippine convenience store chain
- Uncle John's Bathroom Reader, a series of books containing trivia and short essays on miscellaneous topics
- John McCarthy (computer scientist) (1927–2011), computer scientist known as "Uncle John"
