= Uncle John's (chain) =

Filipino convenience store chain

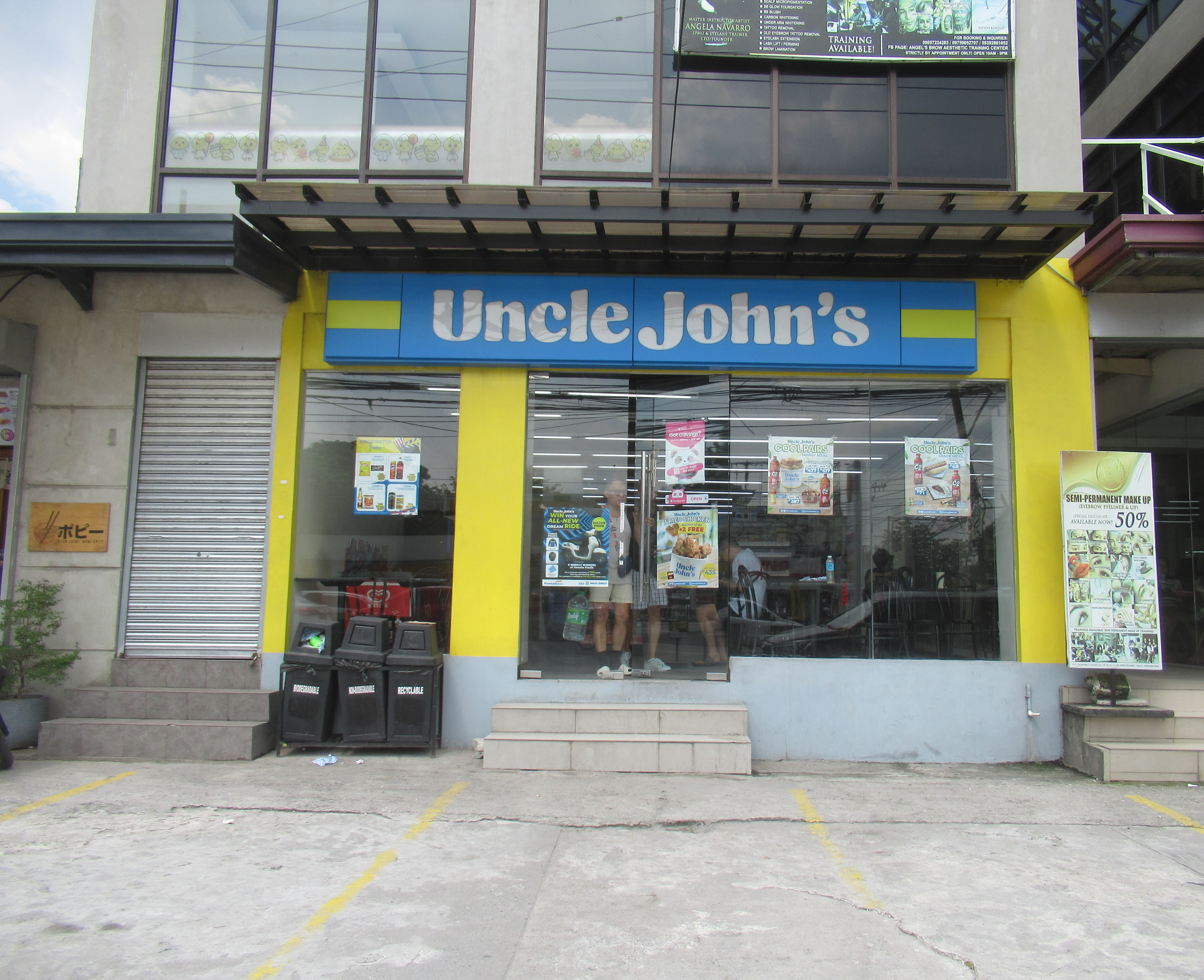
- A store in Balibago, Angeles City
- Formerly: Ministop Philippines (2000–2022)
- Type: Subsidiary
- Industry: Convenience store
- Predecessor: Ministop Philippines
- Founded: December 2000; 25 years ago
- Headquarters: Quezon City, Philippines
- Number of locations: 458 stores (2021)
- Parent: Robinsons Retail Holdings, Inc.
- Website: unclejohns.ph

Uncle John's is a Philippine convenience store chain owned and operated by Robinsons Retail. It was established in 2000 as Ministop through a partnership between Robinsons and Ministop Co., owned by Japanese company Aeon, before adopting its current name in late 2022 following Robinsons' acquisition of Aeon's stakes.

== History ==
=== Ministop Philippines ===
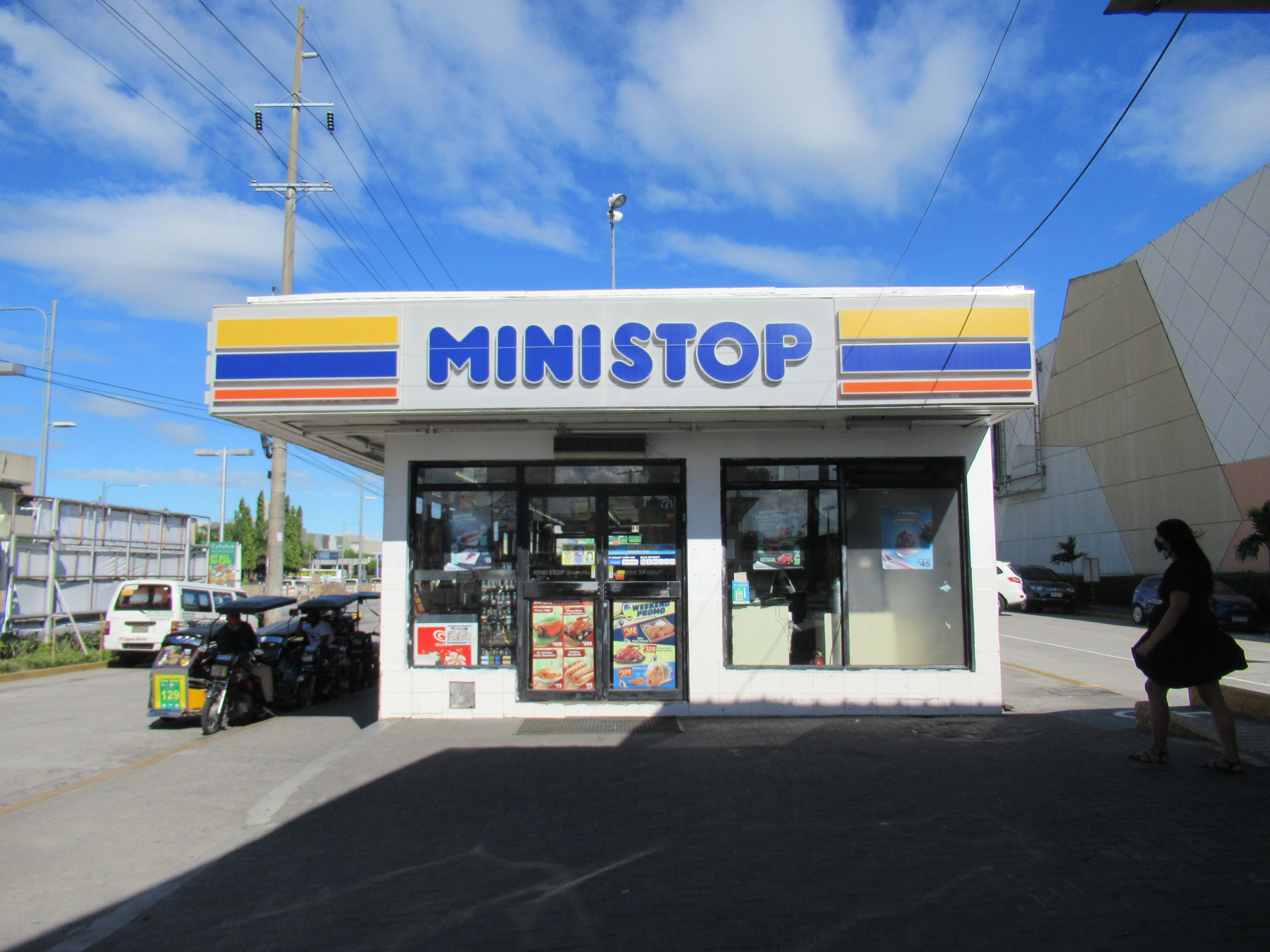
Ministop outlet in San Fernando, Pampanga.

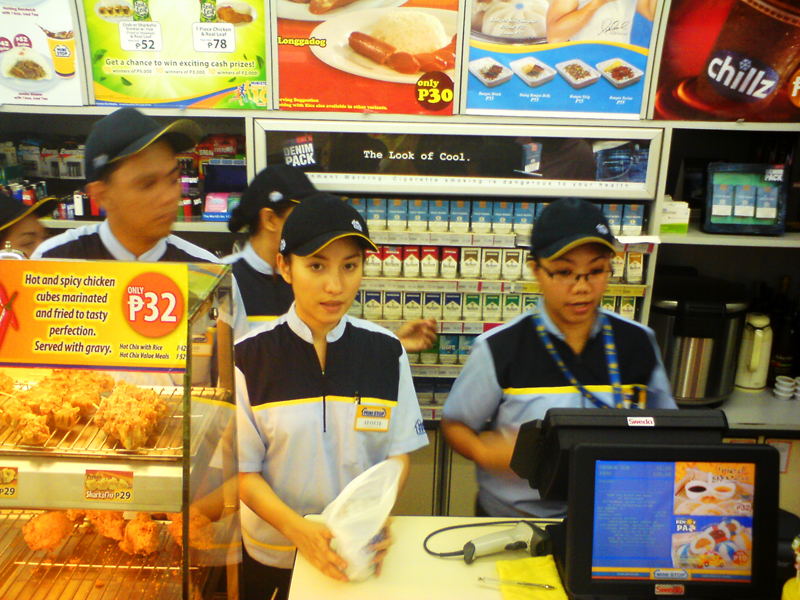
Cashiers at the counter of a Ministop outlet.

Uncle John's traces its roots to the Ministop franchise in the Philippines which was owned by Robinsons Convenience Stores Inc (RCSI). Robinsons Retail Holdings, Inc. (RRHI) of the Gokongwei Group entered into a partnership with Ministop Co. and Mitsubishi Corporation to run the Ministop franchise in the Philippines under RCSI.

The first Ministop branch in the Philippines was opened in December 2000. In 2006, Ministop Philippines introduce the Uncle John's Fried Chicken which would become its flagship product. By 2014, it has grown to the second largest convenience store chain in the Philippines behind 7-Eleven with the opening of the 400th Ministop branch in Bonifacio Global City.

In 2018, RRHI acquired Mitsubishi's stakes in the Ministop Philippines franchise to increase its stakes to 59.1 percent from 51 percent.

In January 2022, AEON, the Japanese parent company behind Ministop, announced that it would pull out Ministop out of the Philippines and South Korea to focus developing the brand in its home market. AEON's partner, Robinsons Retail, would buy out the stakes of the Japanese firm in the Philippines the following month. Robinsons announced that Ministop Philippines would undergo a rebrand, with its local bestsellers such as Uncle John's Fried Chicken would be retained as part of its offerings.

=== Uncle John's ===
In September 2022, it was announced that the Ministop stores in the Philippines would be rebranded as Uncle John's after the flagship fried chicken product of the same name. In October 2022, the outlet in Pampanga was the first to exhibit the new Uncle John's yellow-blue branding. The rebranding process of the Ministop outlets in the Philippines is projected to be completed by 2023. RRHI announced a merger of RCSI with its wholly owned subsidiary Robinsons Supermarket Corp., which was approved by the Securities and Exchange Commission on December 19, 2022, and would take effect on July 1, 2023.

== Branding ==
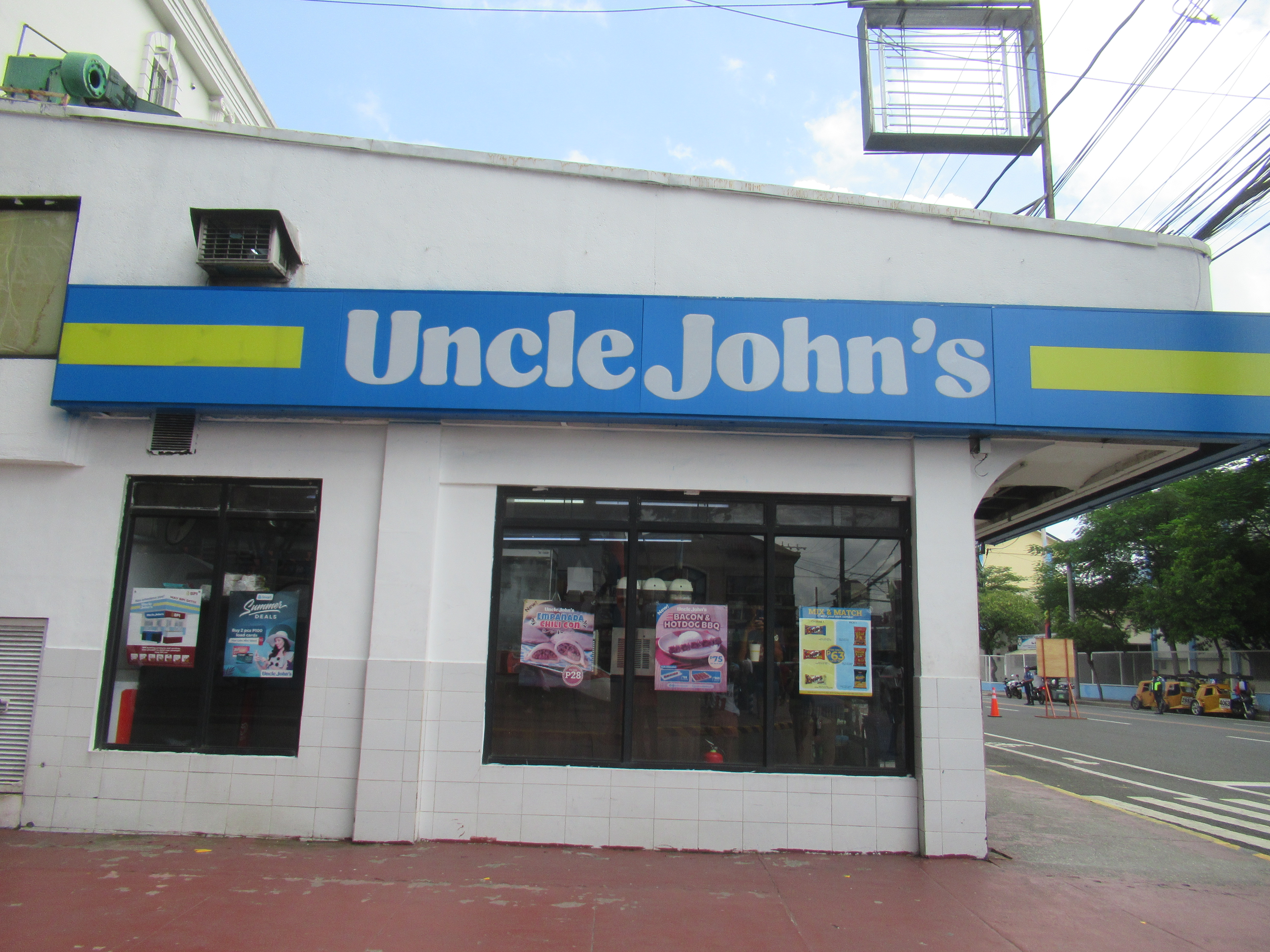
An Uncle John's branch in Marikina

Uncle John's uses blue and yellow as the main colors for its brand. The name of the outlet which came from its fried chicken product was selected through its "Ready, Set, Name!" promotional campaign held in April 2022 which yielded around 80,000 entries. The name of the chicken brand is a reference to RRHI founder John Gokongwei, Jr.

== Products ==
Uncle John's is known for its various signature products which were sold back when it was still operating under the Ministop name. Among these are its fried chicken and kariman fried sandwich.
