= Tropical Hut =

Filipino fast food restaurant chain

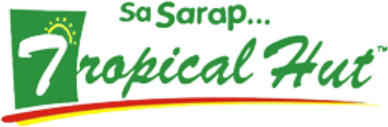

- A Tropical Hut Food Mart outlet along Scout Borromeo Street in Quezon City
- Product type: Fast food chain, grocery store
- Current owner: Mercury Group of Companies, Inc.
- Country: Philippines
- Introduced: 1962; 64 years ago
- Markets: Philippines
- Tagline: "Sarap na Babalik-balikan!" (A delight to keep coming back for)
- Founder: Manuel Azcona
- Number of locations: 22

Tropical Hut is a Filipino chain of fast food restaurants owned by Mercury Group of Companies, Inc.

== History ==
Tropical Hut was established in 1962 by Manuel Azcona and was managed initially under his Big 20 company. The first outlet was in the corner of Panay Avenue and Scout Borromeo.

Tropical Hut started as a sari-sari store that expanded into an ordinary grocery store and later rapidly into a supermarket with a coffee shop. Through its success within these years, the name Tropical Hut Hamburger was introduced with the company being incorporated as Tropical Hut Food Market, Inc. on February 26, 1965.

When the Azconas migrated to Australia, Big 20 was sold to Mariano Que of the Mercury Group of Companies in 1972. The company remain associated with the Azcona family with Manuel Azcona's son marrying Que's daughter, Vivian. Under Que's company, Tropical Hut was expanded, with several new branches across Metro Manila.

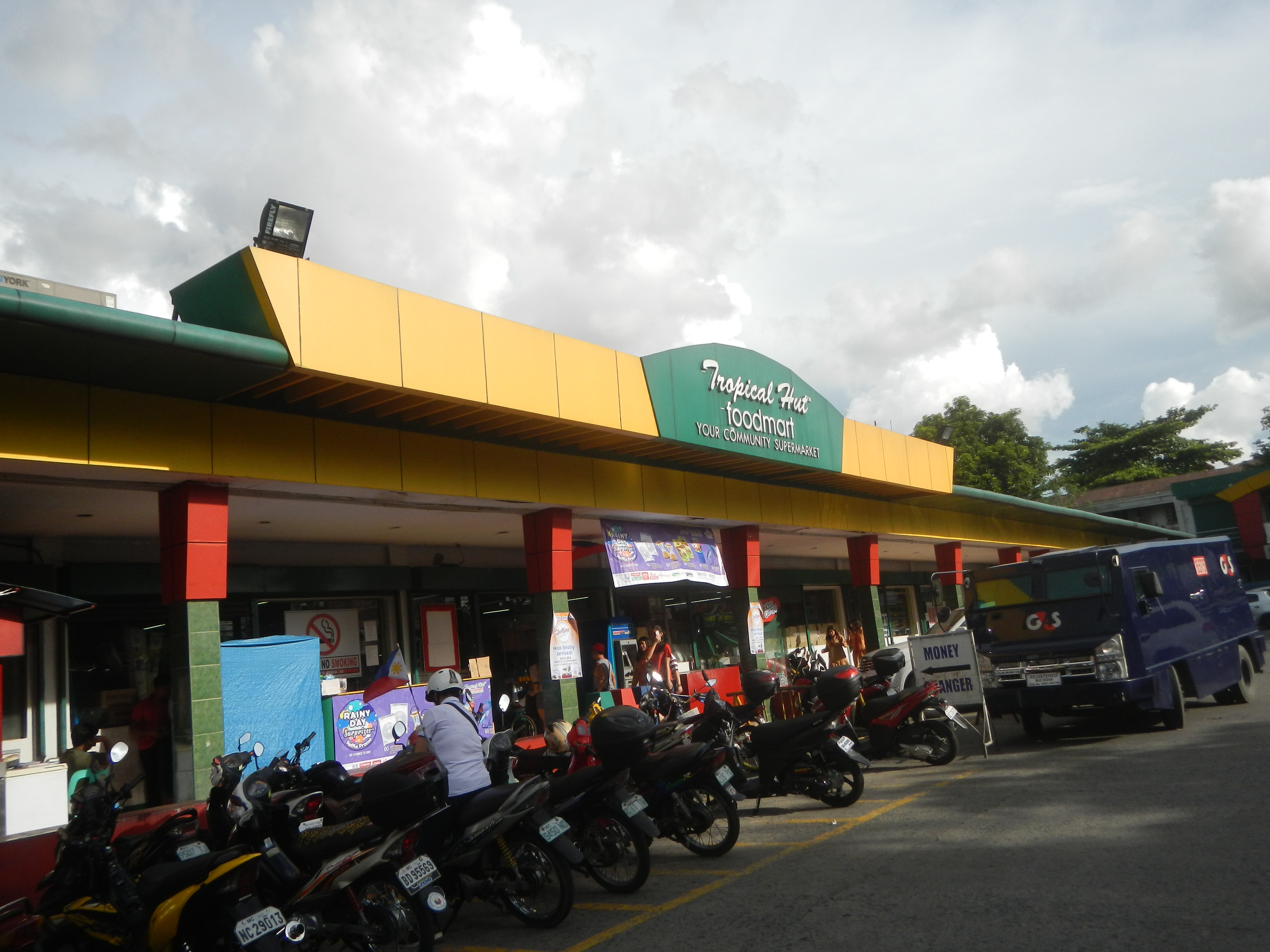
Outlet in Taytay, Rizal

Over the years, Tropical Hut had been overshadowed by other fast food chains like Jollibee and suffered from poor marketing.

However in 2022, Tropical Hut was a beneficiary of a viral content in social media which led to it to hiring more staff to keep up with renewed demand. as well as clamor to open provincial branches.

The Tropical Hut Supermarket in the Scouts Area has ceased operations on July 1, 2025. The final supermarket branch at Panay Avenue in Quezon City closed in July 2026.

== Branch locations ==
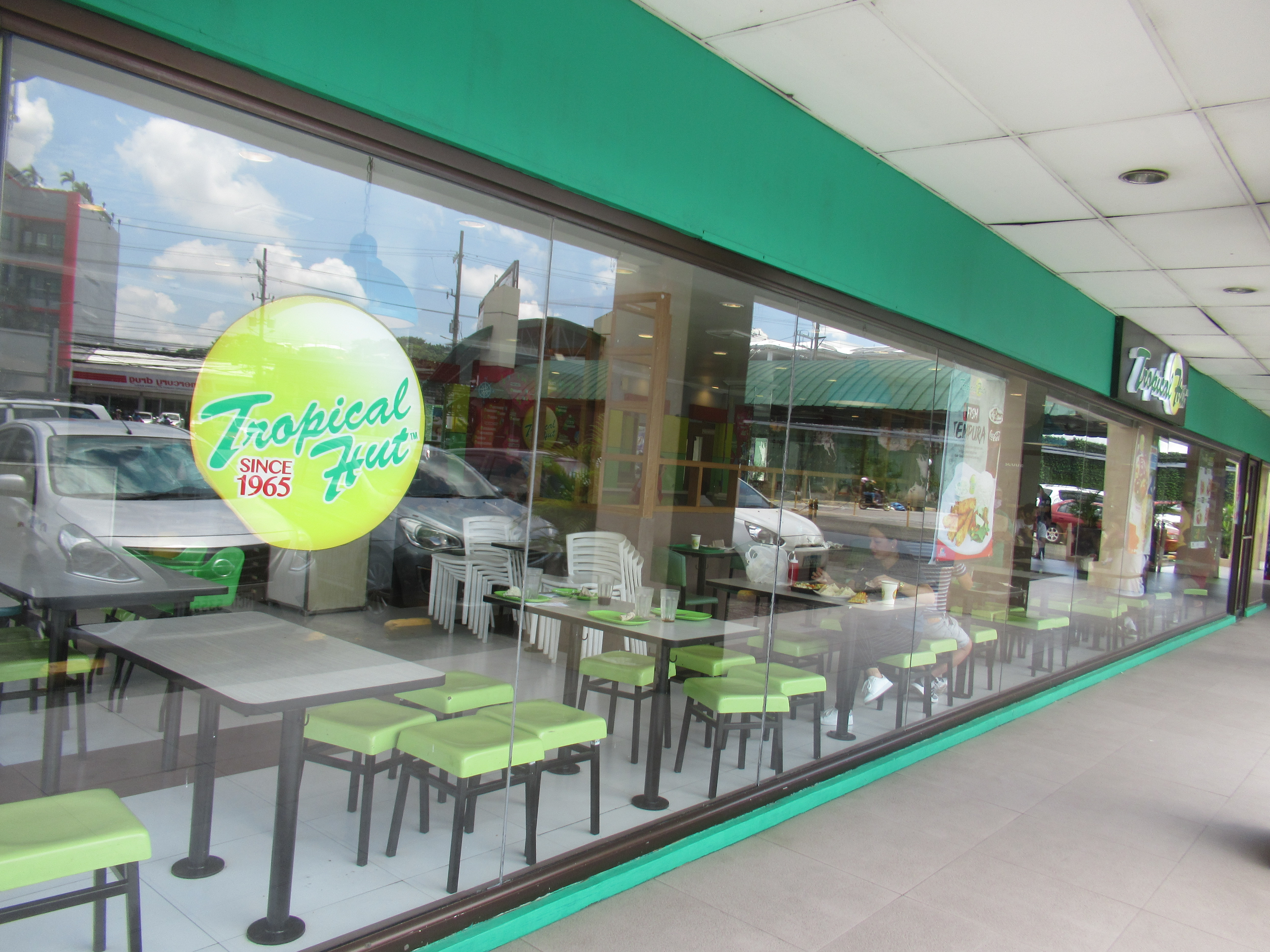
Outlet at Riverbanks Center, Marikina

As of July 2023, Tropical Hut operates 22 stores across the island of Luzon, 18 of which are in Metro Manila. The fast food chain also operates seven stores with 24/7 service.

== In Philippine literature ==
Tropical Hut and its hamburgers have been mentioned in the following books, essays and stories.

- The Tropical Hut Food Mart grocery store and the Tropical Hut Hamburger fast food chain are mentioned as part of a town setting in Prospero Reyes Covar's 1998 essay Larangan: Seminal Essays of Philippine Culture, mentioning the fast food chain's Rancho Ranchero and Hawaiian Glee burgers and clubhouse sandwiches as part of the menu at the time.
- In Layeta Bucoy's short story Tres Amores, Charisma asks a roving male guard at a Robinsons mall if there is a Tropical Hut branch at the mall.
- One of the ten stories covered in Geraldine Maayo's A Quality of Sadness, mentions Tropical Hut's former branch along Session Road in Baguio as a go-to for hamburger lunches and as a stopover for frequent travelers.
- In Wala Lang by Bud Tomas, the author reminisces Tropical Hut as the only burger joint in his hometown.
- In Federico Acuña Espiritu's Tempest: Eye in the Storm, the author mentions that a printing press owner would order hamburgers from a Tropical Hut across a National Book Store branch, which the author regarded as "the best hamburger at that time".
