= Mariano Que =

Chinese-Filipino businessman

- Born: 14 August 1921
- Died: 14 April 2017 (aged 95)
- Occupations: Petty trader, Businessman
- Known for: Founder of Mercury Drug
- Spouse: Estelita de Jesus
- Children: 8

Mariano Que (14 August 1921 – 14 April 2017) was a Chinese Filipino businessman and the founder of the pharmacy chain Mercury Drug.

== Background ==
Born in 1921, Que worked as an employee at Farmacia Central, a major pharmacy owned by Jose Tee Han Kee along Calle Rosario (now Quintin Paredes Street) in Manila, prior to the onset of World War II. He was orphaned during the Japanese occupation of the Philippines.

After the war ended in 1945, Que bought ₱100 (equivalent to ₱6,468 in 2021) worth of Sulfathiazole pills. He sold these drugs in single doses and, using his savings, bought an assortment of medicine which he peddled through a pushcart. He founded Mercury Drug in Bambang on March 1, 1945. Mercury Drug opened its second store in 1963. In 1972, Mercury Drug acquired the Tropical Hut fast-food and supermarket chain.

Mercury Drug expanded outside Metro Manila with the acquisition of Medical Center Drug Corporation, a medical supplies and equipment manufacturer, in 1976.

Que's daughter, Vivian Azcona, took over Mercury Drug and became company president following Que's retirement.

== Death ==
Que died on April 14, 2017, at age 95.

== Personal life ==
Que was married to Estelita de Jesus and had 8 children.
