= The Generics Pharmacy =

Pharmacy chain in the Philippines

TGP Pharma Inc.
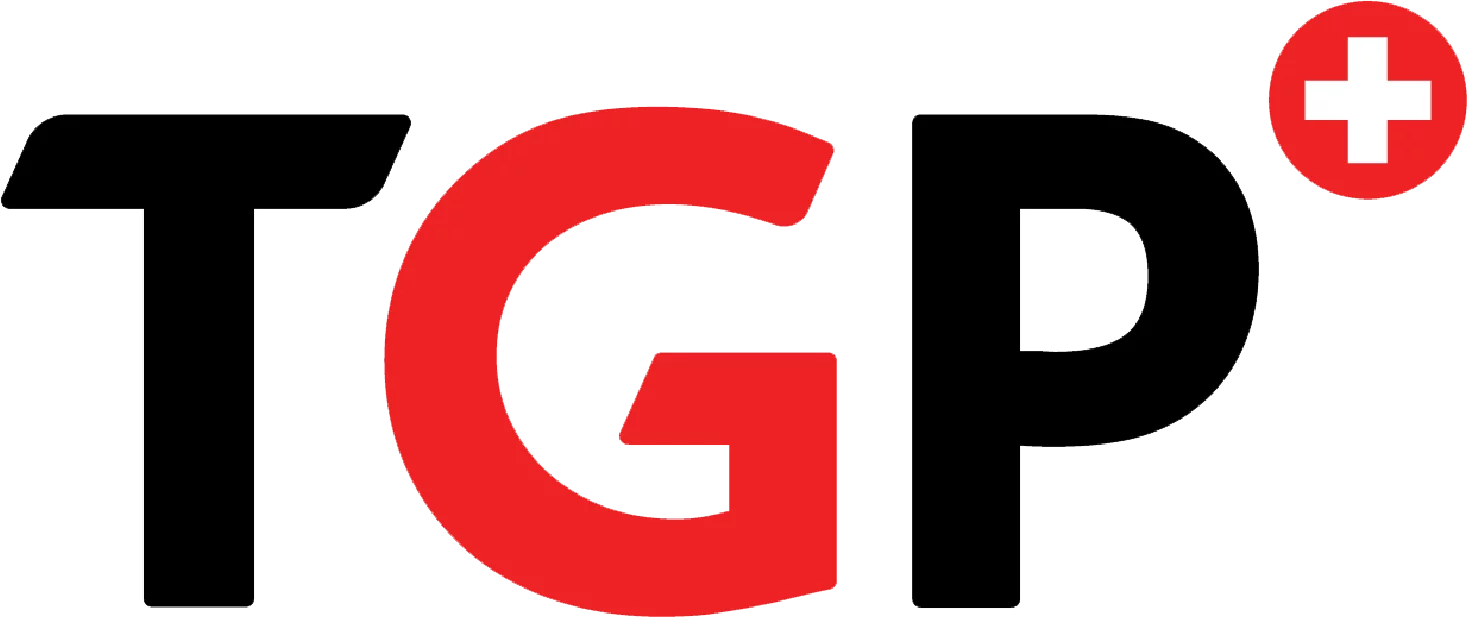

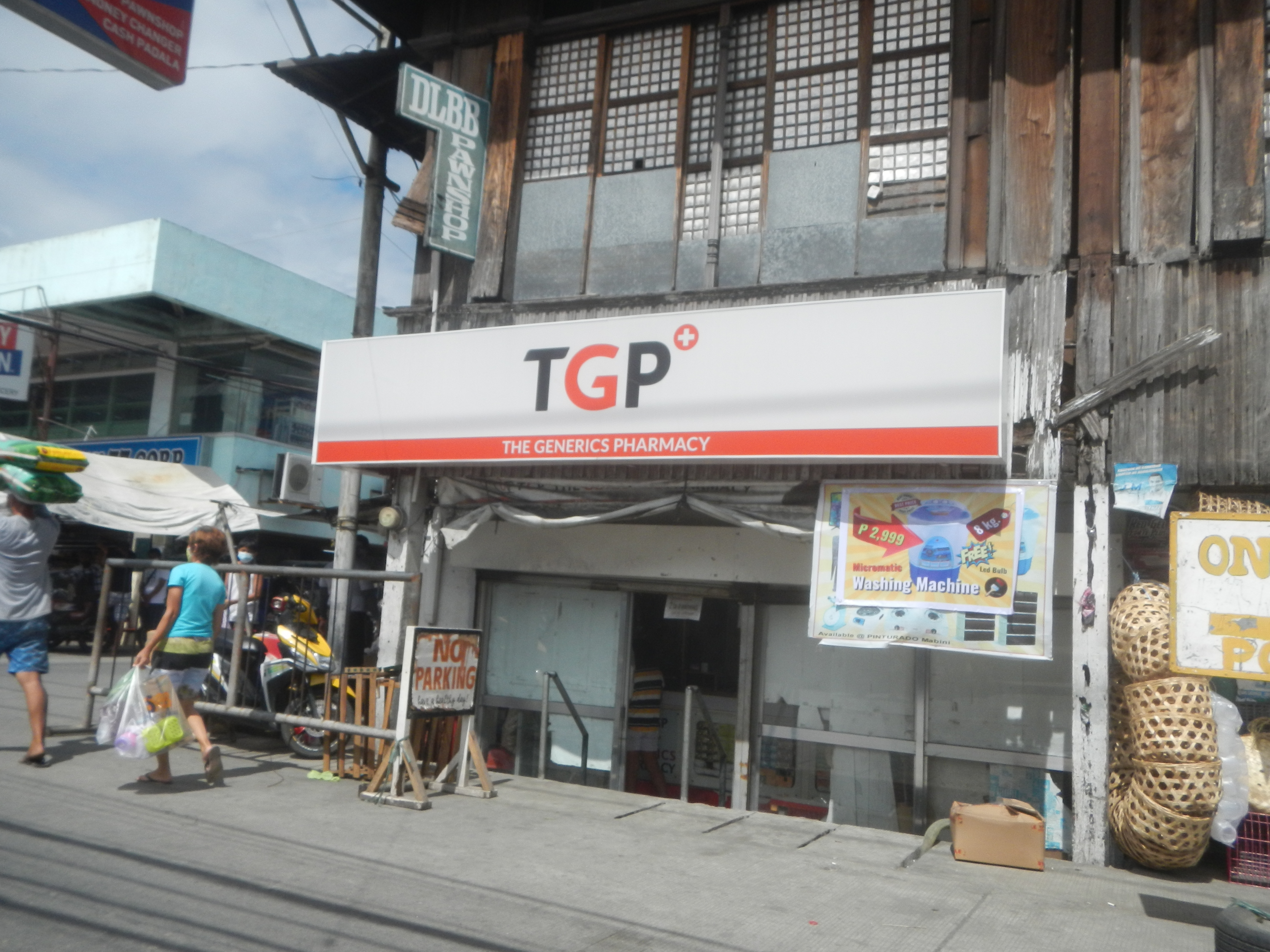
- Outlet in Hagonoy, Bulacan
- Traded as: TGP
- Founded: 2001; 25 years ago in Quezon City, Metro Manila, Philippines
- Founder: Benjamin Liuson
- Number of locations: 2,000+ (2023)
- Area served: Philippines
- Parent: Robinsons Retail Holdings, Inc.
- Website: tgp.com.ph

TGP Pharma Inc. (doing business as TGP), formerly but still known as The Generics Pharmacy, is a Philippine drugstore chain.

== History ==
The Generics Pharmacy was established by businessman Benjamin Liuson. The Liusons, a traditional Chinese family, have been involved in the pharmaceutical industry since 1959 through Pacific Pharma, an importer and wholesaler of drugs.

In 1983, Pacific Pharma shifted to investing on generic drugs. The company initially largely sold generic drugs wholesale to government hospitals.

Doctors of the Philippine General Hospital would recommend their clients to buy drugs from the Liusons' company at its headquarters along Quezon Avenue in Quezon City the early 2000 despite being purely a wholesaler at the time. This led to the opening of DLI Pharmacy in 2001 – later credited as the first The Generics Pharmacy (TGP) outlet.

The pharmacy store catered to customers as far as from Bulacan, Cavite and Laguna who often request DLI to open an outlet in their area. This led to the adoption of a franchising business model for DLI in 2007, allowing the opening of several outlets. DLI changed its name to The Generics Pharmacy (TGP) when it became open for franchising.

By 2014, The Generics Pharmacy has changed its official name to TGP, with its owners believing it would promote better brand recall.

By 2016, the Robinsons Retail of the Gokongwei family have acquired 51 percent stake in TGP, or a majority stake. Robinsons also owns South Star Drug and Rose Pharmacy.

== Products ==
TGP primarily sells generic drugs promoting it as a cheaper alternative to branded counterparts. TGP does sell non-pharma branded drugs as well as branded pharma products with unexpired patents. TGP also has its own private label drugs or "generic" products under the TGP name.
