= Robinsons Supermarket =

Philippine supermarket chain

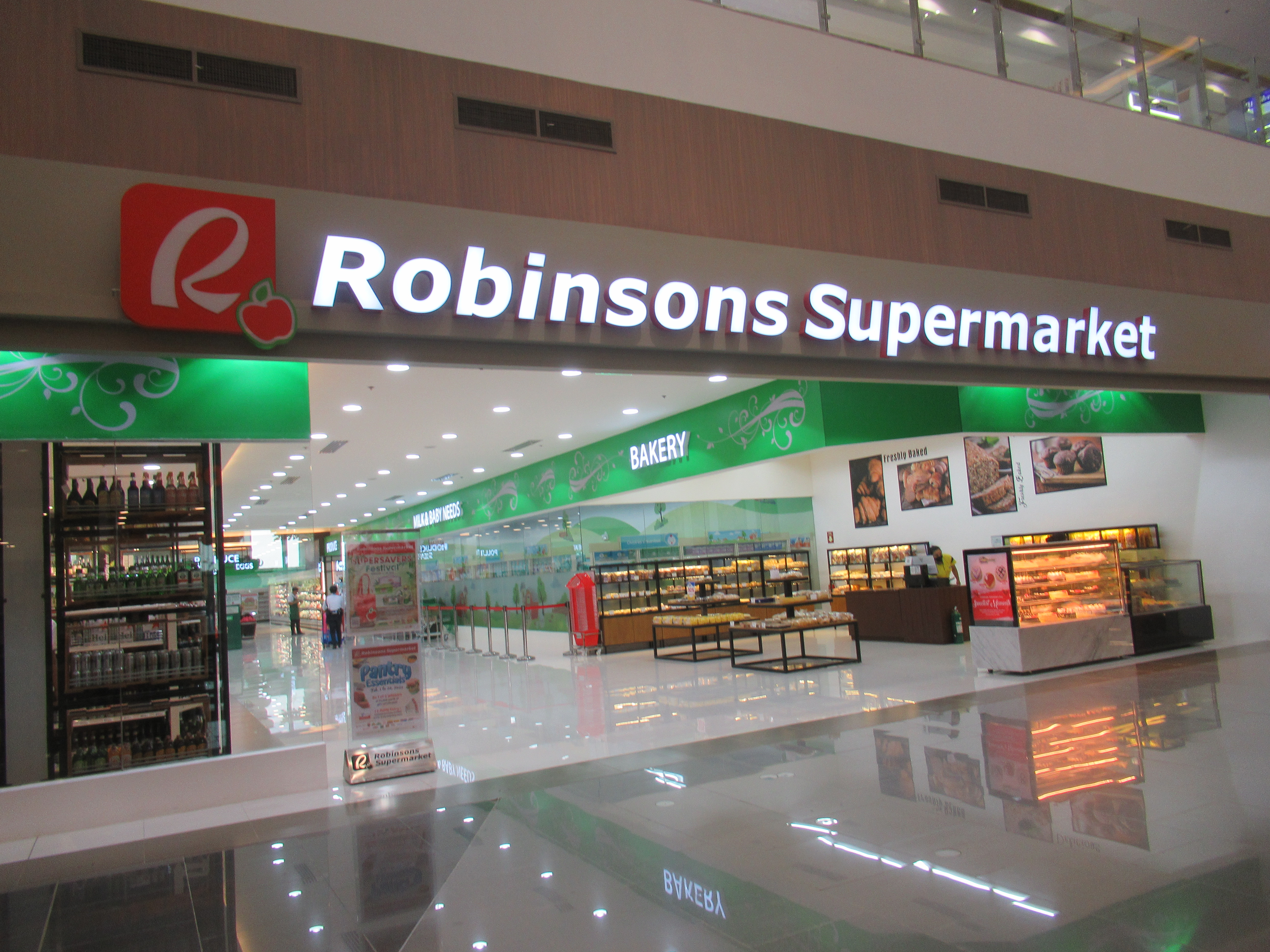
- A Robinsons Supermarket branch at Robinsons Gapan
- Company type: Subsidiary
- Industry: Supermarket
- Founded: 1985; 41 years ago
- Founder: John L. Gokongwei, Jr.
- Headquarters: Quezon City, Philippines
- Number of locations: 151 (2024)
- Area served: Philippines
- Key people: Robina Y. Gokongwei-Pe (Chairman); Stanley C. Co (President and CEO)
- Parent: Robinsons Retail Holdings, Inc.
- Website: www.robinsonssupermarket.com.ph

Robinsons Supermarket is a supermarket chain in the Philippines and a division of Robinsons Retail Holdings, Inc. (RRHI). It is the second largest supermarket chain in the Philippines with 151 branches (as of 2024) across the country. It was established in 1985 with its first branch located in Cebu.

== See also ==
- Robinsons Malls
