= Robinsons Retail =

One of the largest omnichannel retailers in the Philippines

Robinsons Retail Holdings, Inc.

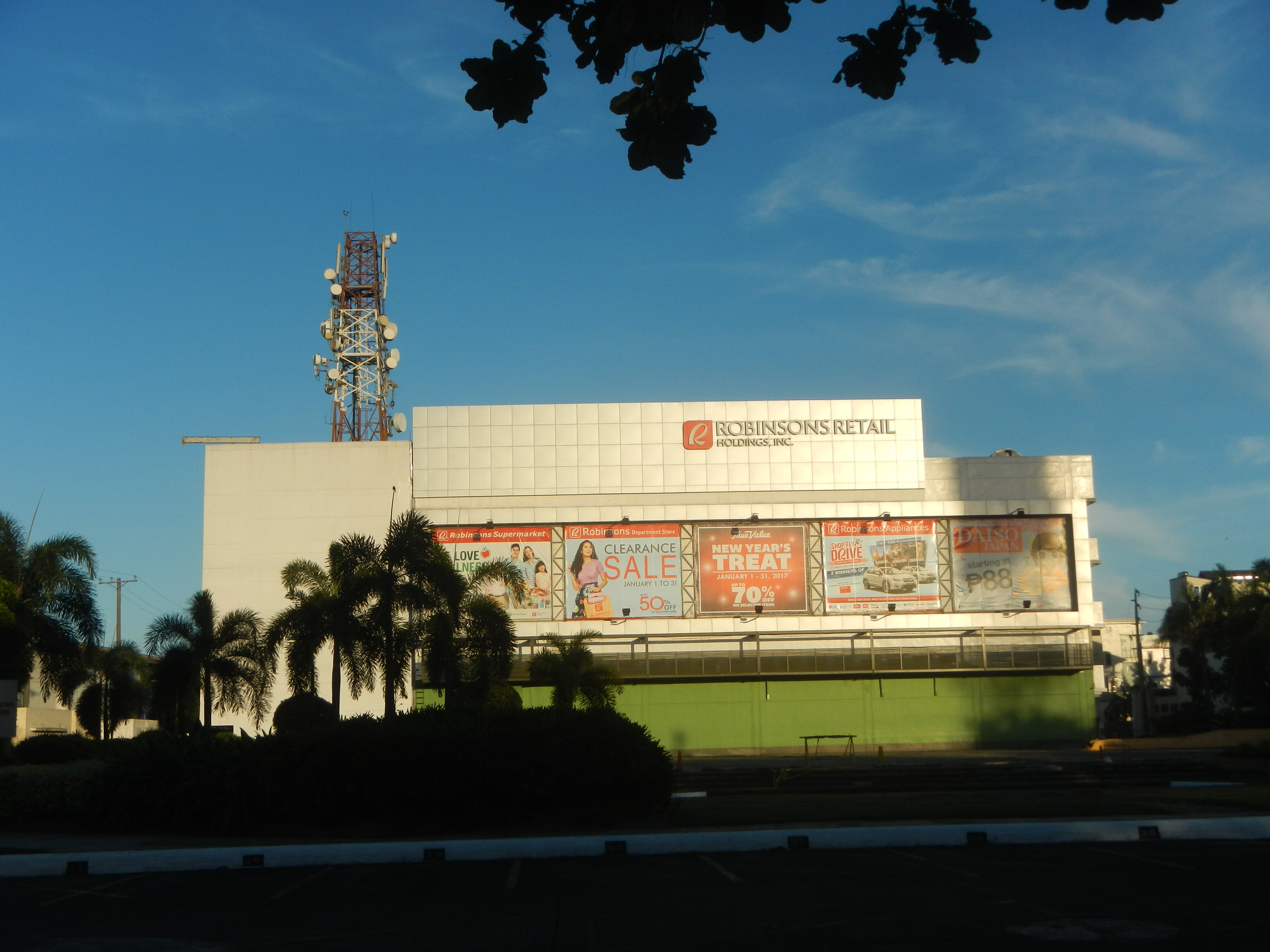
- RRHI headquarters in Quezon City
- Type: Privately-held, stock for-profit company
- Industry: Retail
- Founded: 1980; 46 years ago (as Robinsons Department Store)
- Founder: John L. Gokongwei, Jr.
- Headquarters: 110 Eulogio Rodriguez Jr. Avenue, Quezon City, Philippines
- Number of locations: 761 food segment stores; 1,133 drugstores (excluding 2,115 franchised The Generics Pharmacy stores); 50 department stores; 227 DIY stores; 282 specialty stores (appliances and electronics, toy stores, mass merchandise, beauty, pet retail, and lifestyle sneaker); (2024)
- Area served: Philippines
- Key people: Directors: Robina Y. Gokongwei-Pe (Chairman); James L. Go (Vice Chairman); Stanley C. Co (President and CEO); Scott Price (Director); Curtis Liu (Director); Cirilo P. Noel (Lead Independent Director); Rodolfo P. Ang (Independent Director); Enrico S. Cruz (Independent Director); Cesar G. Romero (Independent Director); Lance Y. Gokongwei (Board Adviser)
- Revenue: ▲ ₱199.2 billion (2024)
- Net income: ▲ ₱10.3 billion (2024)
- Total assets: ▼ ₱134.234 billion (2021)
- Total equity: ▼ ₱76.513 billion (2021)
- Number of employees: ▲20,535 (2021)
- Divisions: Appliances and electronics; Beauty; Convenience stores; Department stores; DIY and hardware; Drugstores; E-commerce; Mass merchandise; Pets; Supermarkets; Toys
- Subsidiaries: Subsidiary List: Robinsons Supermarket Corporation; Robinson's Handyman, Inc.; Robinsons True Serve Hardware Philippines, Inc.; Waltermart-Handyman, Inc.; Handyman Express Mart, Inc.; RHI Builders and Contractors Depot Corporation; Homeplus Trading Depot, Inc.; Robinsons Appliances Corporation; Robinsons Convenience Stores, Inc.; South Star Drug, Inc.; Rose Pharmacy, Inc.; TGP Pharma, Inc.; The Generics Pharmacy Inc.; Everyday Convenience Stores, Inc.; Robinsons Daiso Diversified Corporation; RHD Daiso-Saizen, Inc.; Robinsons Ventures Corporation; RHMI Management and Consulting, Inc.; RRHI Management and Consulting, Inc.; RRG Trademarks and Private Labels, Inc.; RRHI Trademarks Management, Inc.; Savers Electronic World, Inc.; New Day Ventures Limited; Robinsons Lifestyle Stores, Inc.; Super50 Corporation; Consolidated Global Imports, Inc.
- Website: Official website

Robinsons Retail Holdings, Inc., formerly traded as RRHI, is one of the largest multi-format retailers in the Philippines.

== History ==
Founded by Filipino businessman John Gokongwei Jr. in 1980, Robinsons Retail started as Robinsons Department Store in Robinsons Place Manila. It expanded into supermarkets in 1985, DIY in 1994, and convenience stores and specialty stores in 2000.

Robinsons Retail itself was incorporated on February 4, 2002 to serve as a holding company of the Gokongwei Group's retail endeavors. It entered the drugstores business in 2012.

Robinsons Retail was listed at the Philippine Stock Exchange starting in 2013.

Robinsons Retail launched a chain of community malls in 2015.

On March 31, 2026, the controlling shareholders publicly disclosed that they intend to make the company privately-held again, subject to approvals such as those of at least two-thirds of the total outstanding capital stock, on its annual shareholders' meeting on May 12 as well as that of government authorities such as the Philippine Competition Commission and Securities and Exchange Commission. The shareholders voted in favor of the delisting and thus the tender offer ran from May to July 6. It was reported that up to 99.69% of outstanding shares were validly tendered, and thus approval for the delisting from the bourse would be sought thereafter. It was eventually delisted at the end of August.

It is the second largest retail company in the Philippines based on sales as of 2025, behind SM Retail.

== Brands ==
=== Department stores and groceries ===
Robinsons Retail owns various retail outlets including Robinsons Supermarket, Robinsons Easymart, The Marketplace, and Shopwise. Robinsons Retail acquired Rustan Supercenters Inc. in 2018, managing the former Rustan's Supermarket chain.

The company is also the master franchise of the No Brand retail chain of Korean company Emart. No Brand was introduced in the Philippines by Robinsons in 2019, but closed all standalone stores by June 2026.

It partly owns the discount store chain O!Save of HD Retail Holding Pte. Ltd.

=== Convenience store ===
Robinsons also introduced the Japanese convenience store chain Ministop in the Philippines opening the first outlet in the country in December 2000. After AEON, the Japanese parent company behind Ministop withdrew the brand from the Philippines, all Ministop outlets in the Philippines was converted by Robinsons into Uncle John's.

=== Pharmacies ===
It also owns various pharmacy chains, Southstar Drug, The Generics Pharmacy and Rose Pharmacy. The company acquired those chains in 2012, 2016, and 2020 respectively.

== See also ==
- JG Summit Holdings
