= Southstar Drug =

Drugstore chain in the Philippines

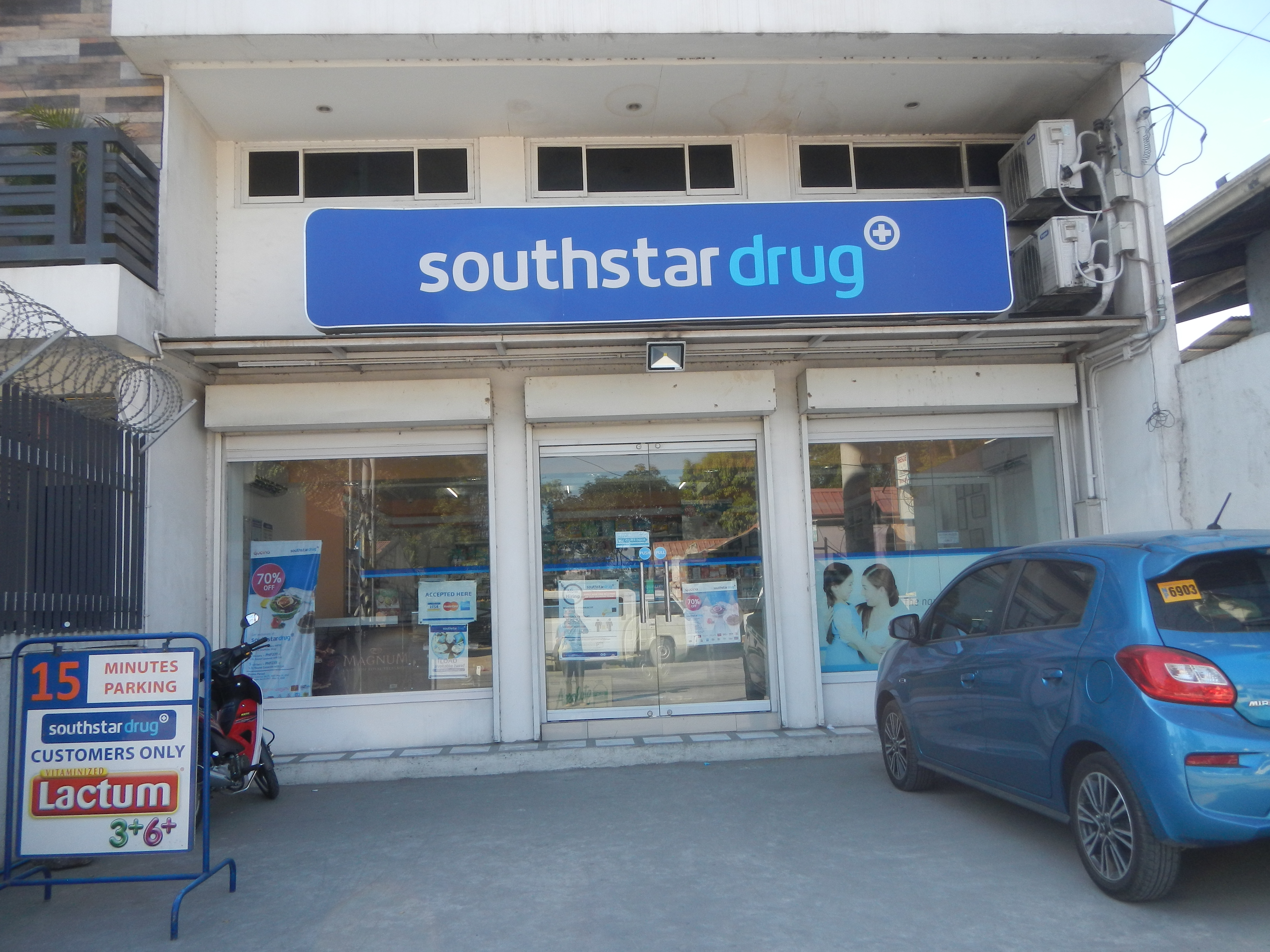
- A branch in Santa Ana, Pampanga
- Formerly: Southern Drug (1937–1950); New South Star Drug (1950–1990s)
- Company type: Private
- Industry: Retail
- Founded: July 4, 1937; 88 years ago in Naga, Camarines Sur
- Founder: Tomas Dy-Makao
- Headquarters: 110 Eulogio Rodriguez Jr. Avenue, Bagumbayan, Quezon City, Metro Manila
- Number of locations: 650 drugstores (2023)
- Area served: Philippines
- Key people: Robina Y. Gokongwei-Pe (Chairman); Stanley C. Co (President and CEO); Thaddeus L. Sanchez (General Manager)
- Products: Drug and other pharmaceutical products.
- Parent: Robinsons Retail
- Website: southstardrug.com.ph

Southstar Drug is a chain of drugstores in the Philippines.

== History ==
Southstar Drug was established in 1937 as a small business venture engaged in the retail of Chinese herbal medicines, located in Naga, Camarines Sur, and is the oldest operating drugstore in the Philippines. Southstar Drug was formerly known as Southern Drug (1937–1950) and New South Star Drug (1950–1990s). It faced competition from Watsons (which entered the Philippine market in 2002) and Mercury Drug.

Presently, Southstar Drug belongs to the top 1,000 corporations of the Philippines. It has spread out to more than 500 branches nationwide. Since 2012, Southstar Drug is owned by Robinsons Retail, the Philippines' second largest retail chain.

From its origins in Southern Luzon, Southstar Drug has expanded its business by first putting up more stores in Southern Luzon, then in Northern Luzon (following the acquisition of Manson Drug chain in 2011) and the islands of Mindoro, Masbate, and Catanduanes (through Virac). Southstar recently expanded in the Visayas region in 2010 (through its region's first branch in Samar). Southstar sells fresh medicines and goods in remote communities.
