= Nuvali =

- Planned community
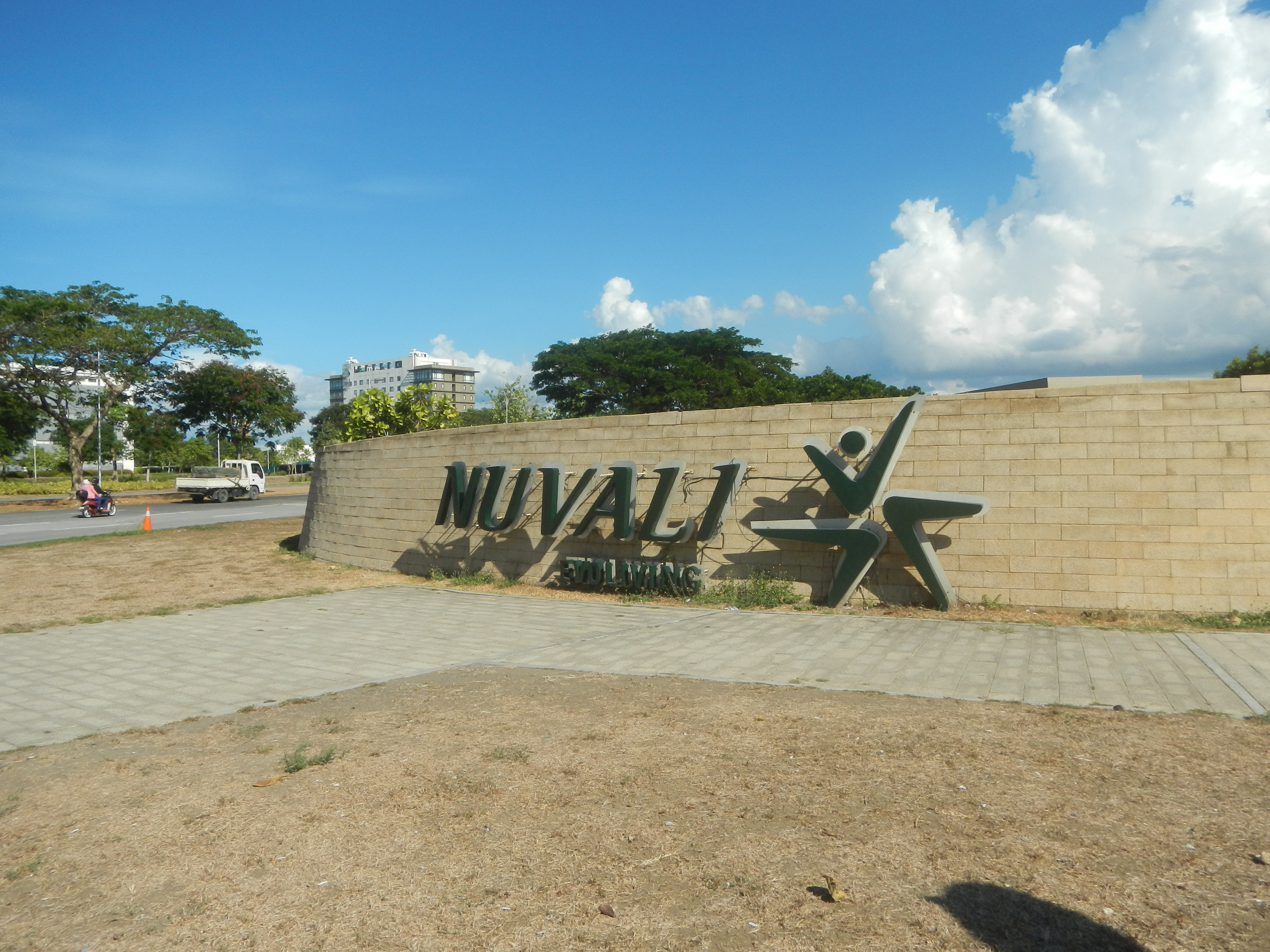
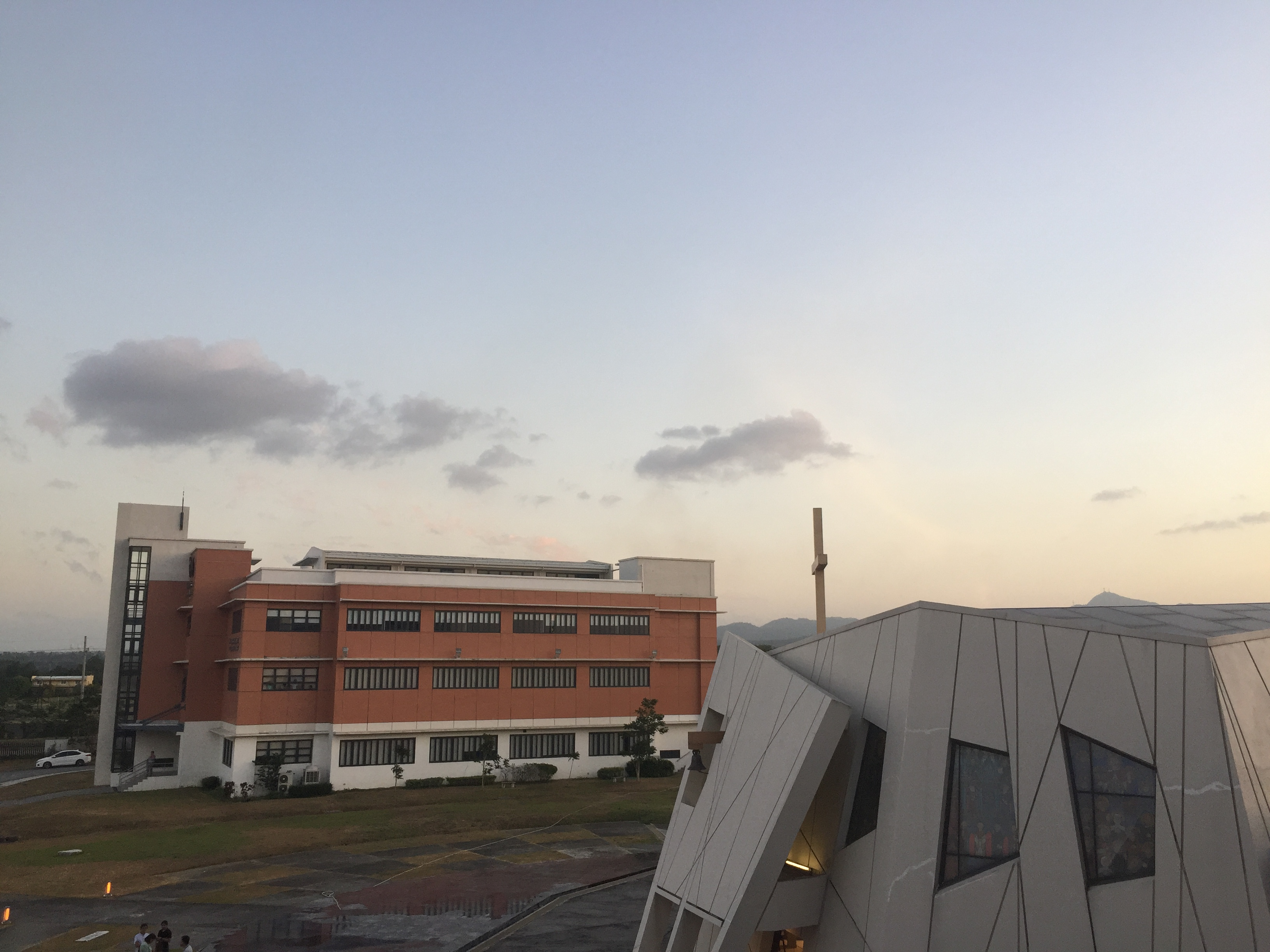
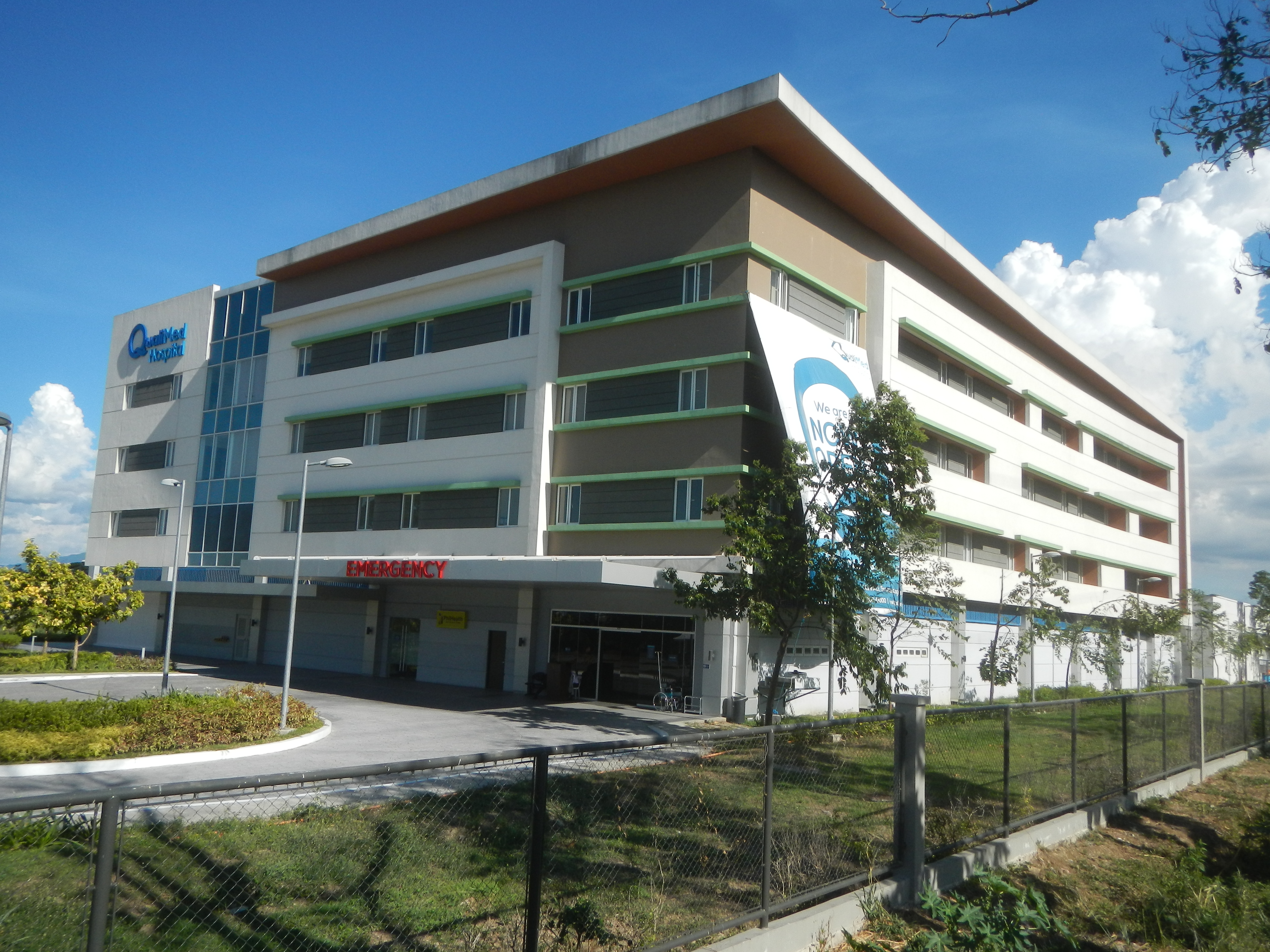
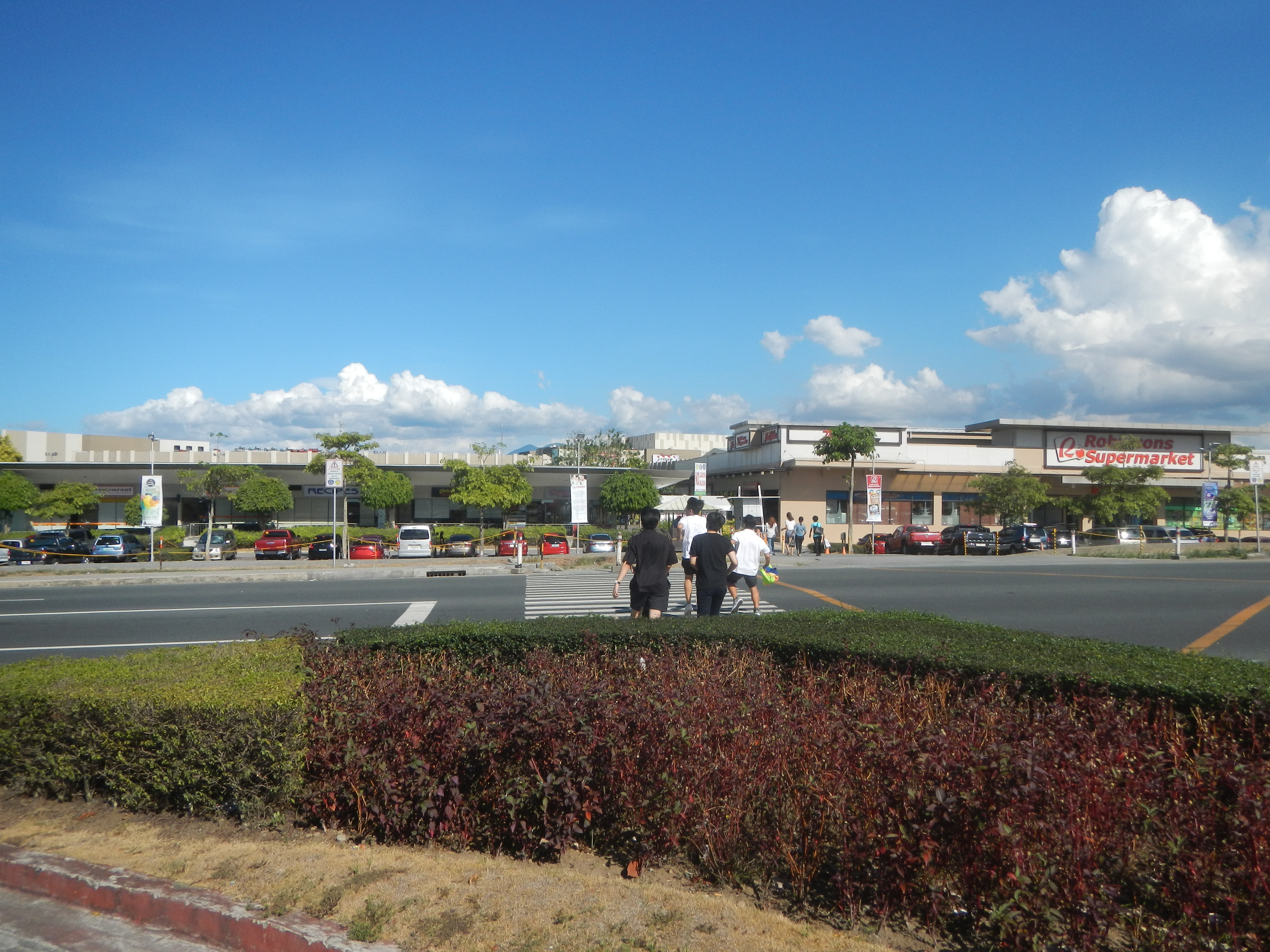
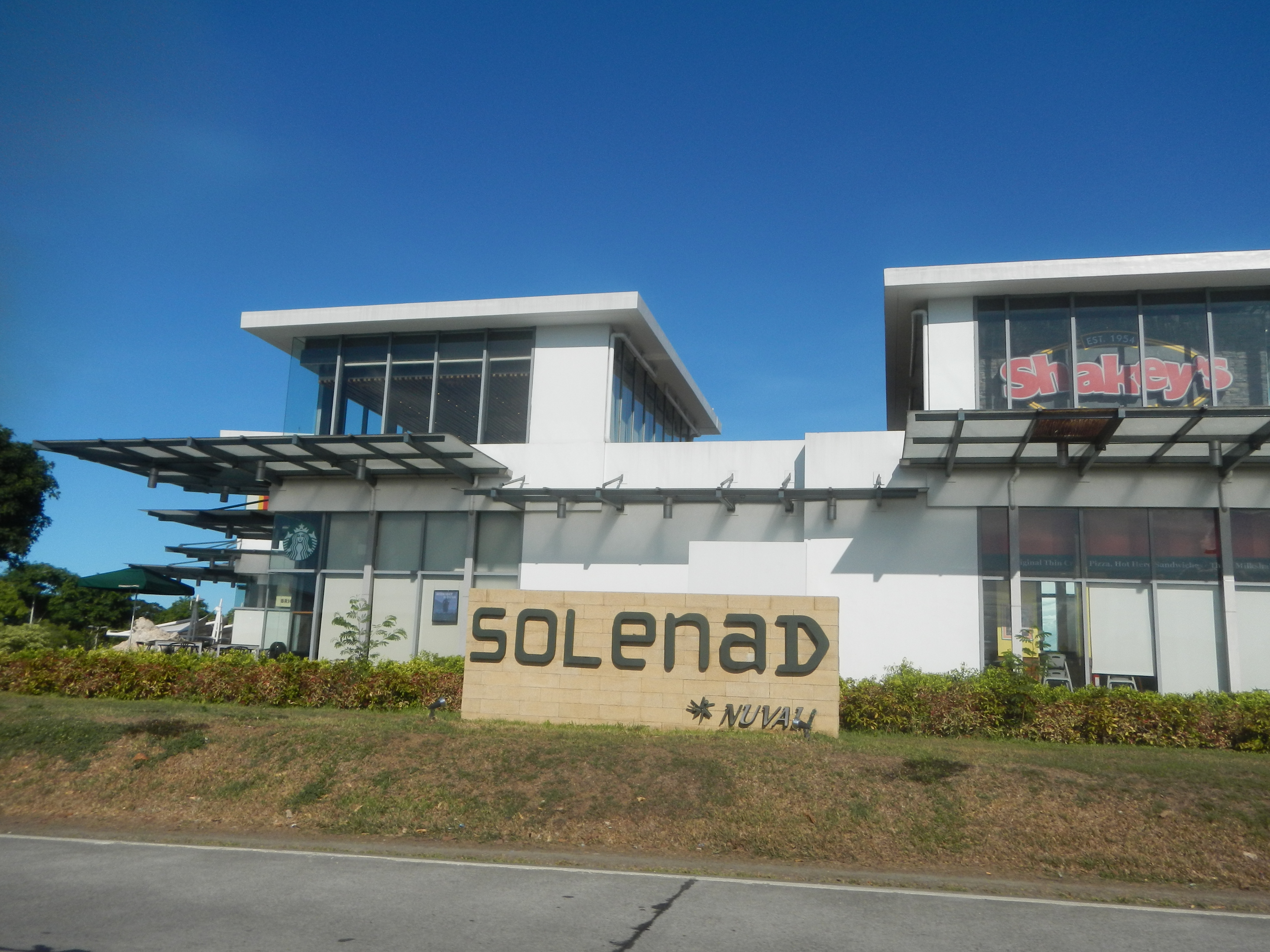
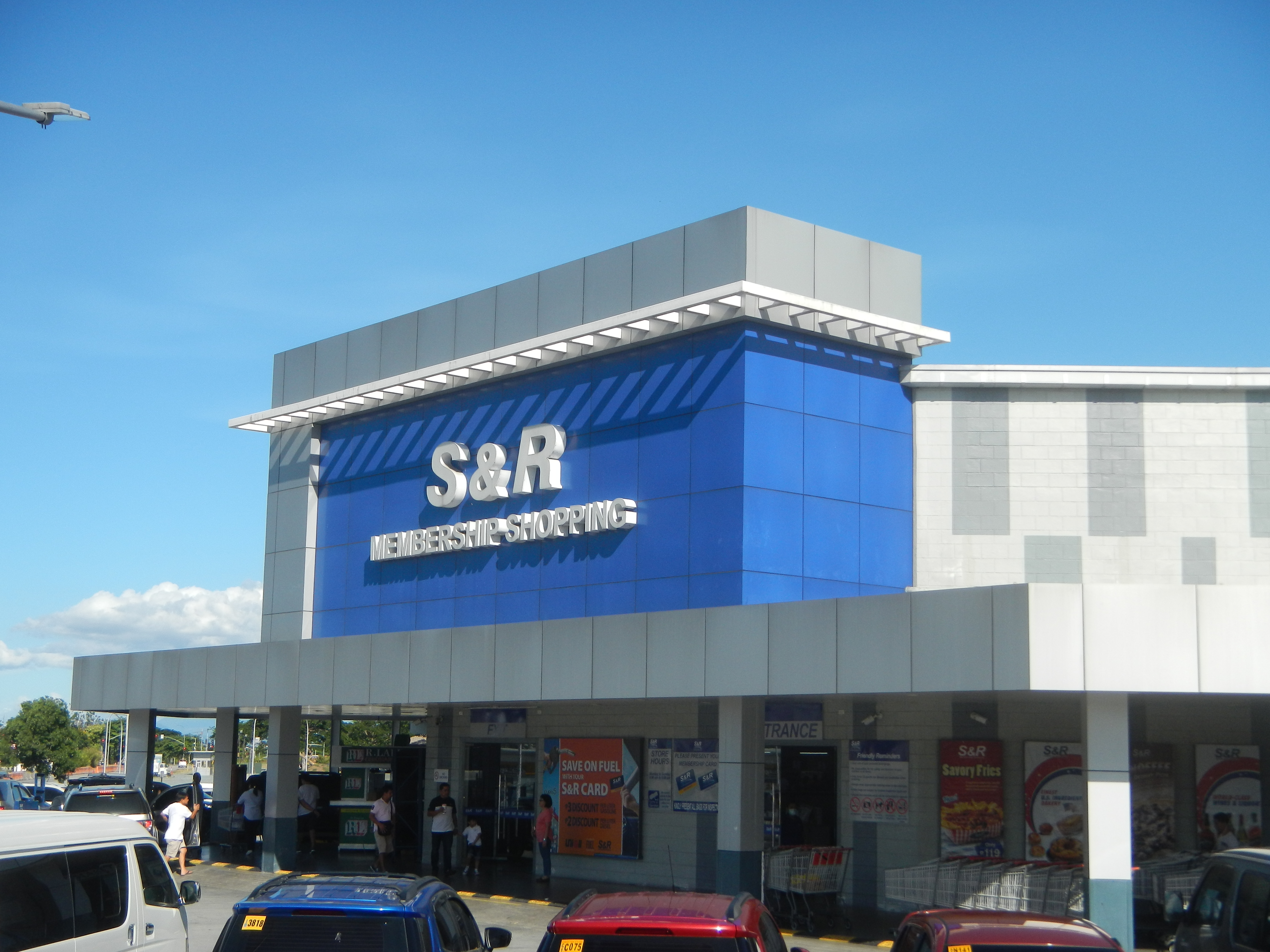
- Clockwise from top: Wall Marker, Xavier School Nuvali, Ayala Malls Solenad 2, S&R Nuvali, Solenad 1, Healthway QualiMed Hospital Santa Rosa

- Location of Nuvali within Calabarzon
- Coordinates: 14°13′03.1″N 121°03′50.6″E
- Country: Philippines
- Region: Calabarzon
- Province: Laguna
- Cities: Cabuyao; Calamba; Santa Rosa
- Established: April 26, 2009

Area
  - Total: 22.9 km^{2} (8.8 sq mi)
- Time zone: UTC+8 (PST)
- Website: ayalaland.com/estates/nuvali

Nuvali (stylized in all caps) is a planned community designed as an eco-city by Ayala Land. A combination of commercial, residential, recreational, and educational developments, it covers the cities of Cabuyao, Calamba, and Santa Rosa in the province of Laguna in the Philippines.

== History ==
The site of what is now Nuvali was under a hacienda owned by the Yulo family since 1948. The 7,100-hectare (18,000-acre) estate was developed into a sugar plantation. The farmers have demanded agrarian reform over the years, portions of which has been repurposed into commercial developments by Yulo-affiliated corporations and partners.

On September 16, 2008, employees of Ayala Land planted trees at a site now under Nuvali. Ayala Land formally launched Nuvali in April 26, 2009 as a 17-kilometer-long (11 mi) green development straddling three cities in Laguna – Santa Rosa, Calamba and Cabuyao. Nuvali is a collaboration between Ayala Land and the Yulo family.

Infrastructure would get built including Solenad, which was opened in 2009 and relaunched as an Ayala Mall in 2015 with the addition of its third wing, and the Qualimed Hospital in 2017; both are located on the Santa Rosa side. Ayala Malls Solenad began its expansion in 2024 and has since been rebranded as Ayala Malls Nuvali.

By 2019, Nuvali has expanded to a 2,290-hectare (5,700-acre) development.

In early 2025, a planned Santa Rosa Civic Complex in Nuvali was announced. In November 2025, Metro Nuvali, a major central business district on the Santa Rosa side, was launched. It is divided into three districts: the Lakeside District, Central District, and Civic District (the location of the Santa Rosa Civic Complex). Another shopping mall in the estate called SM Nuvali is expected to open in November 2026.

== Demographics ==
As of 2025, Nuvali has over 32 residential subdivisions with approximately 13,000 residents.

== Education ==
Nuvali hosts campuses of Xavier School, Miriam College, and Everest Academy, all located in Calamba.

== Sports ==
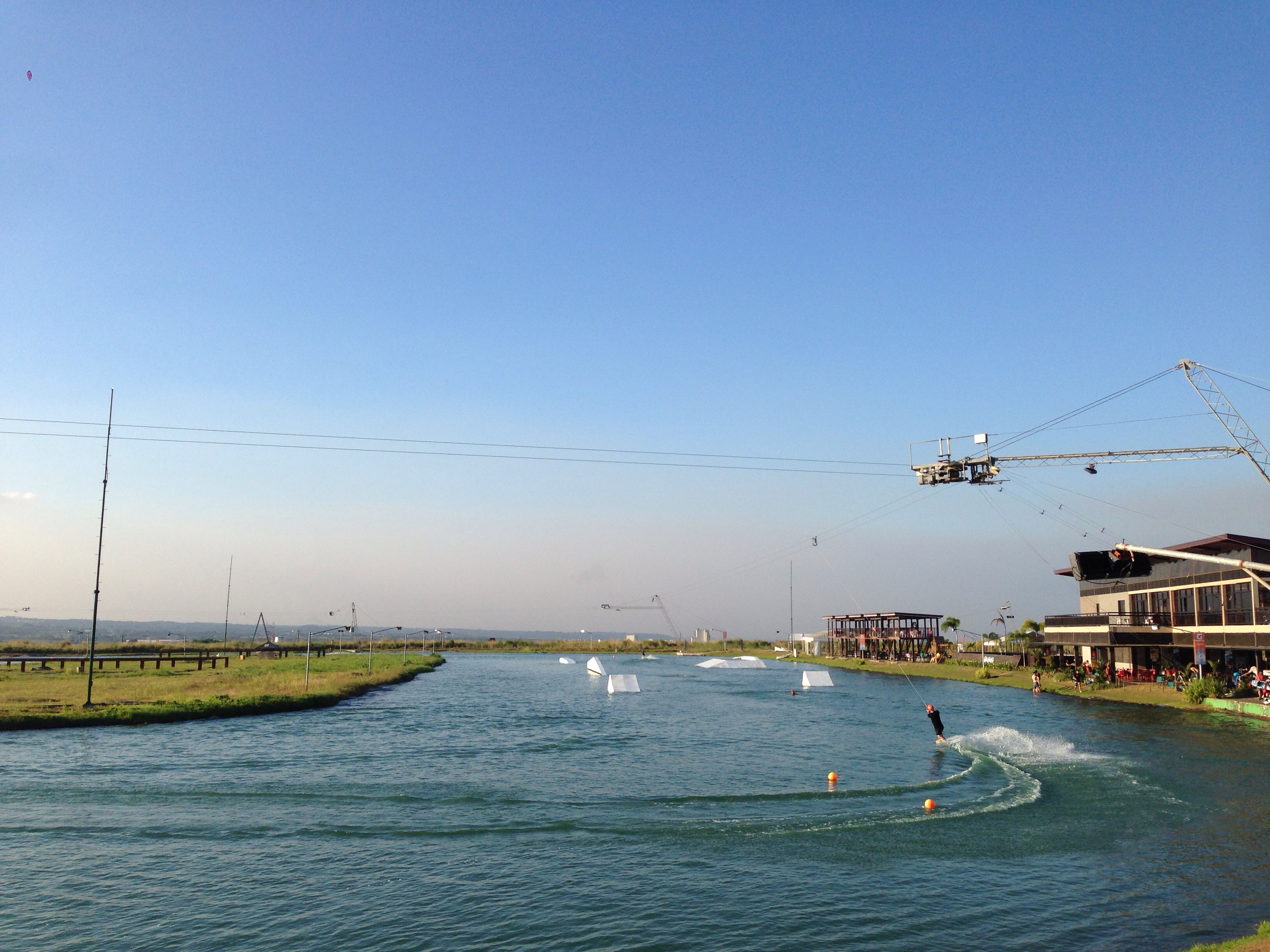
Republic Wakepark

From 2012 to 2021, Nuvali had the Republic Wakepark, a wakeboarding venue. It closed due to financial reasons and the COVID-19 pandemic.

The Nuvali Sand Courts in Santa Rosa has hosted the Asian Beach Volleyball Championships in 2024.

== Transportation ==
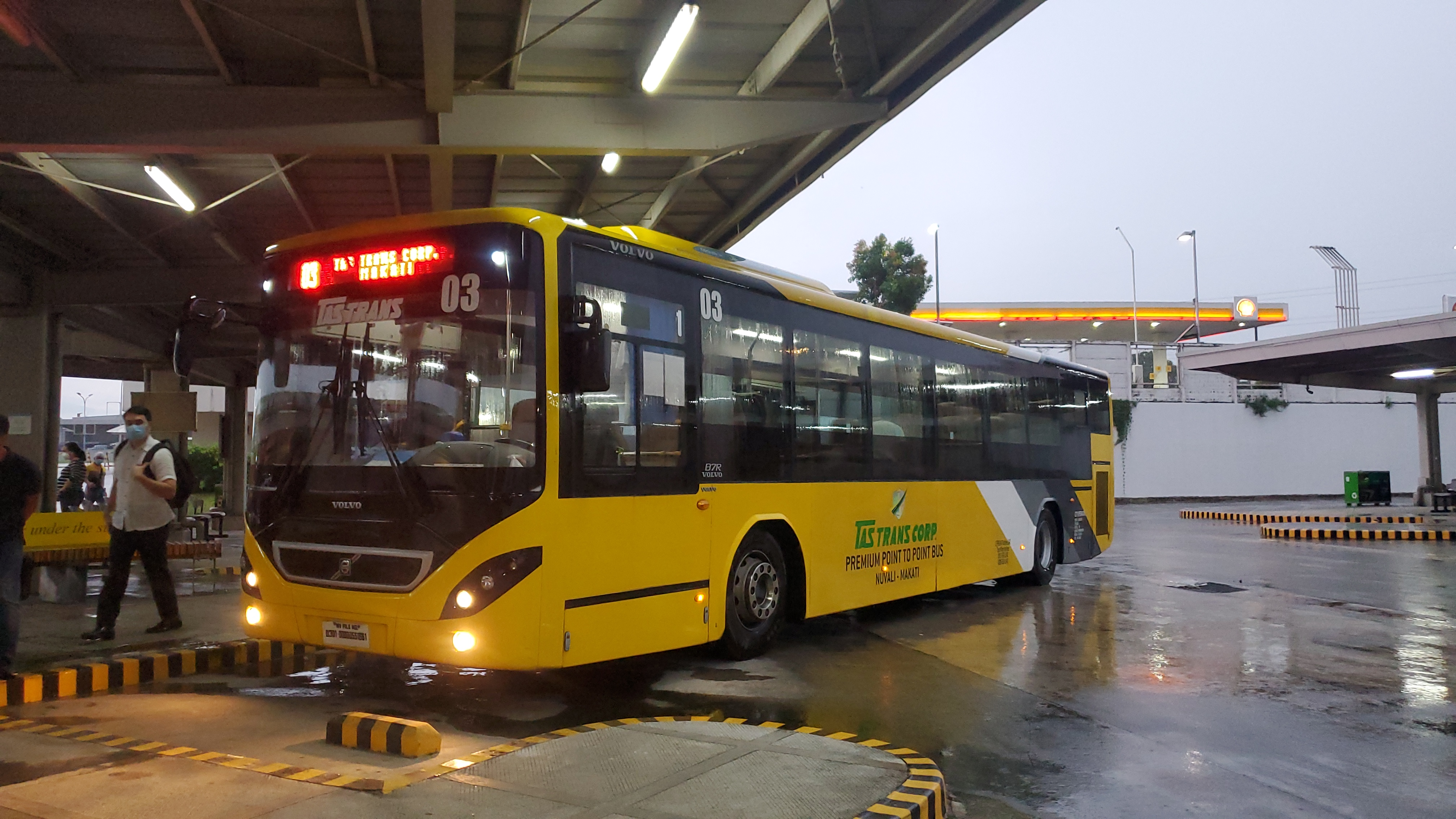
P2P bus parked at Nuvali Transport Terminal

The Cavite–Laguna Expressway serves Nuvali, with exits at Santa Rosa–Tagaytay and Laguna Boulevard.

The Nuvali Transport Terminal, located next to Ayala Malls Nuvali, serves the eco-city. It is the terminal of point-to-point buses bound for Makati and Ninoy Aquino International Airport, shuttles plying inside Nuvali and Canlubang, public utility vans bound for General Mariano Alvarez and Dasmariñas, minibuses bound for Santa Rosa Commercial Complex in Balibago, Santa Rosa, and tricycles plying nearby areas in Santa Rosa and western Biñan.
