= Lance Gokongwei =

President and CEO of JG Summit (born 1966)

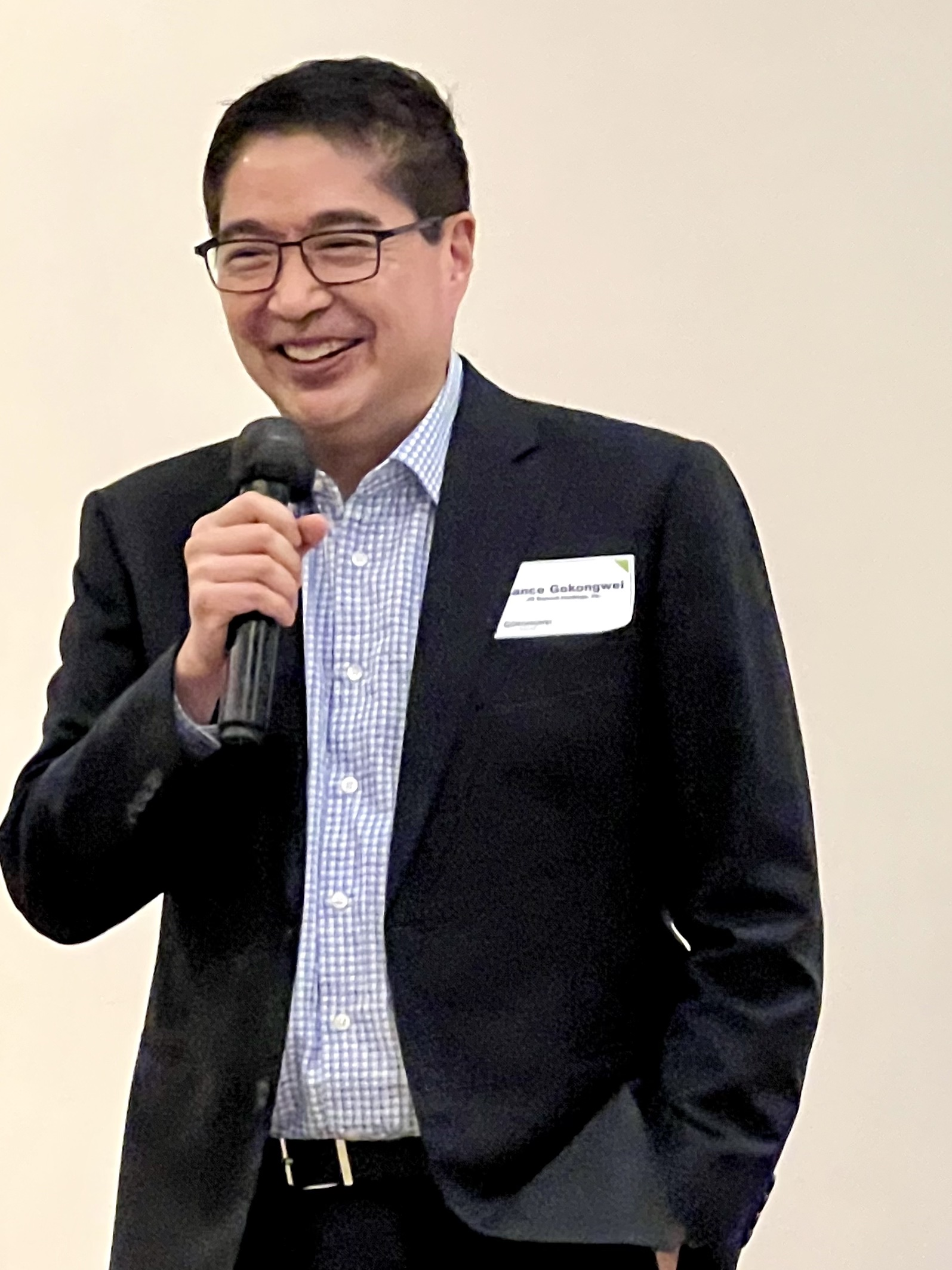
- Gokongwei in 2022
- Born: Lance Yu Gokongwei; November 23, 1966 (age 59); Manila, Philippines
- Citizenship: Filipino
- Education: University of Pennsylvania (BS)
- Occupation: Businessman
- Title: Head of the Gokongwei Group; President and CEO of JG Summit Holdings; Chairman of Universal Robina, Cebu Pacific, Robinsons Land; Vice Chairman of Manila Electric Company; Board Adviser of Robinsons Retail; Chairman of the Gokongwei Brothers Foundation
- Spouse: Jay Leong
- Children: 2
- Parents: John Gokongwei (father); Elizabeth Yu Gokongwei (mother)

Lance Yu Gokongwei (born 23 November 1966) is a Filipino billionaire businessman. He is the president and CEO of JG Summit Holdings, Inc. since 2018. Gokongwei is the only son of businessman John Gokongwei Jr. He and his siblings are listed among the richest in the country.

== Early life ==
Gokongwei was born in Manila as the second of six children. His father, John Gokongwei, established JG Summit Holdings Inc., while his mother, Elizabeth, was a founding member of Robinsons Department Store. He went to Xavier School until the second year of high school. He then finished his last two years of high school in Singapore.

In 1988, he graduated from the University of Pennsylvania with a double degree in Finance and Applied Science (summa cum laude).

== Business career ==
Gokongwei began his career joining the family business as a management trainee at Universal Robina Corporation (URC). He sold Jack ’n Jill snacks to supermarkets, groceries, and sari-sari stores.

=== Universal Robina ===
In the late 1990s, Gokongwei became general manager of URC's branded food business, where he led the development of beverages. In 2004, the company introduced C2, a ready-to-drink tea that went head-to-head with foreign cola companies that dominated the beverage sector in the Philippines. It was so successful that another production line was required to meet demand.

In 2013, Gokongwei became chief executive of URC. The following year, he partnered with Japan's Calbee and France's Danone for potato chips and beverages, respectively. He also acquired New Zealand-based cookie maker Griffin's Foods for 700 million New Zealand dollars ($609 million at the time), giving Universal Robina a presence in the South Pacific. The partnership with Calbee, ended five years later as Calbee suffered losses in the Philippine market.

In 2021, URC bought Malaysia's Munchy Food Industries for 1.9 billion ringgit ($454 million) to become the nation's leading biscuits manufacturer.

=== Cebu Pacific Air ===
In 1996, Gokongwei was tasked by his father to take on the challenge of building a new low-cost airline, Cebu Pacific Air. In February 1998, two years after the company's inception, Cebu Pacific Flight 387 crashed into a mountainside, killing all 104 people aboard. At the time, it was the nation's worst air disaster.

In 2010, Cebu Pacific became the Philippines largest airline.

In December 2022, Gokongwei announced his resignation as president and CEO of Cebu Pacific.

Earlier in the year, Gokongwei joined five other businessmen in a consortium that proposed to revamp Manila's Ninoy Aquino International Airport by spending 267 billion pesos. The government rejected the bid in July.

=== JG Summit Holdings ===
In 2018, Gokongwei was named CEO of JG Summit Holdings, a holding company which provides consumer foods, agro-industrial and commodity food products, real property development, hotels, telecommunications, petrochemicals, air transportation and power generation.

=== Robinsons Land ===
Lance Gokongwei took over as president and CEO of Robinsons Land Corp. in January 2024, following the resignation of his cousin, Frederick D. Go, from both positions.

Earlier, Malacañang announced Go's appointment as the head of the Office of the Special Assistant to the President for Investment and Economic Affairs.

Gokongwei later resigned from his position as president and CEO of Robinsons Land on February 1, 2025 while maintaining his role as chairman of the company. He was succeeded by Mybelle V. Aragon-GoBio.

== Energy ==
Gokongwei joined the board of SP New Energy Corp. (SPNEC) in May 2024. SPNEC is a subsidiary of Solar Philippines, the largest solar energy provider in the Philippines.

Gokongwei has been a director of Manila Electric Co. (Meralco) since 2013 when JG Summit acquired ownership in the power utility firm.

== Sustainability ==
Gokongwei is a member of the National Advisory Council of WWF Philippines. In 2020, Gokongwei was named a member of board of the Global Reporting Initiative (GRI), representing the business enterprise sector.

== Philanthropy ==
Gokongwei is the chairman of the Gokongwei Brothers Foundation, the largest private sector provider of STEM scholarships in the Philippines. On its 30th year, the foundation's goal is to participate in the learning journey of 10,000 teachers and one million learners by 2025.

== Awards ==
Gokongwei won the EY-Bank of Singapore Asean Entrepreneurial Excellence Award for 2024. The award recognizes "successful Southeast Asian businesses that contribute to the economy and community in the region."

Gokongwei was awarded the 2005 Entrepreneur of the Year by Ernst and Young, one of Ten Outstanding Young Men in the Philippines in 2000, Finance Asia's Best CEO in 2015 and 2018, and Institutional Investors Best CEO in 2015.

== Personal life ==
Gokongwei is married to Jay Leong. They have a daughter and a son.

In 2016, Gokongwei wrote a book titled Lessons from Dad, John Gokongwei Jr. He also contributed to an anthology titled Letters to My Children.
