= Turned, ground, and polished =

Turned, ground, and polished (TGP) is a classification of finishing processes often used for metal shafting. Turning (on a lathe) creates straight round bars without the strain induced by cold drawing, while grinding and polishing improves the surface finish and roundness for high dimensional accuracy. Extreme straightness is critical in high-speed applications to prevent vibration and reduce wear on bearings.

== See also ==
- Drawn, ground, and polished
