= Drawn, ground, and polished =

Drawn, ground, and polished (DGP) is a classification of finishing processes often used for metal shafting. Cold drawing increases the metal's strength, while grinding and polishing improves the surface finish and roundness for high dimensional accuracy.

== See also ==
- Turned, ground, and polished
