= Mercury Drug =

Pharmacy chain in the Philippines

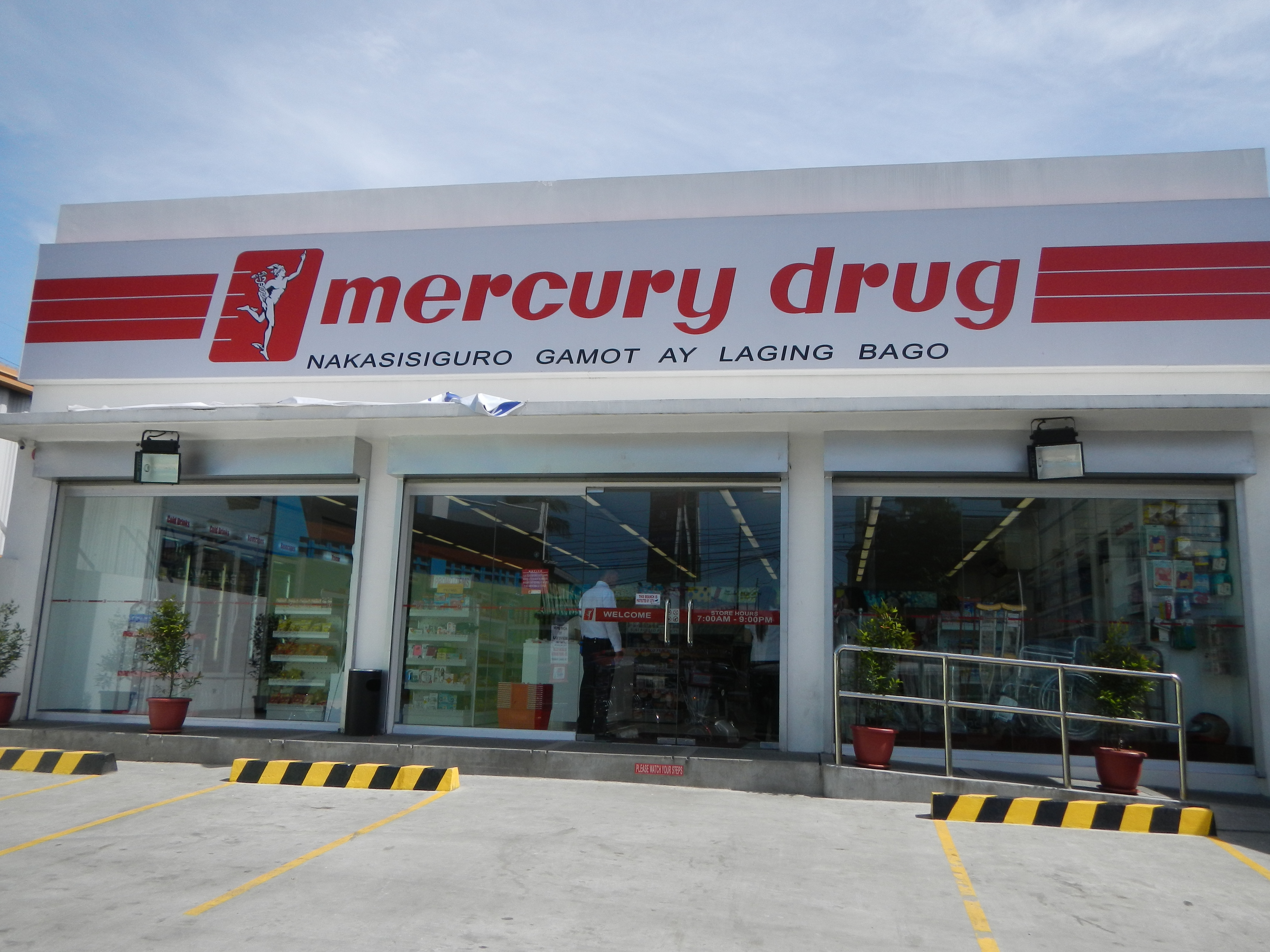
- A branch in Pulilan, Bulacan
- Type: Private
- Traded as: Mercury Drug
- Industry: Retail
- Founded: March 1, 1945; 81 years ago in Bambang Street, Santa Cruz, Manila, Philippines
- Founder: Mariano Que
- Headquarters: Bagumbayan, Quezon City, Philippines
- Number of locations: 1,200
- Area served: Philippines
- Products: Drug and other pharmaceutical products.
- Revenue: ₱132.73 billion (2017)
- Number of employees: 15,000
- Parent: Mercury Group of Companies, Inc.
- Website: mercurydrug.com

The Mercury Drug Corporation, better known as Mercury Drug, is a Philippine pharmacy chain. A subsidiary of the Mercury Group of Companies, it is headquartered in Bagumbayan, Quezon City. The chain was founded in Santa Cruz, Manila in 1945. As of 2017, Mercury Drug has over 1,000 branches nationwide and over 50 percent of the Philippine pharmaceutical retail market.

== History ==
A blister pack sold by the piece (tingí-tingî).

The company began on March 1, 1945, with a single drugstore along Bambang Street, Santa Cruz, Manila owned by Mariano Que (d. April 15, 2017). He named it after Mercury, the messenger of the gods in Roman mythology, whose caduceus wand is sometimes used as a symbol of medicine, as well as the element of the same name and the closest planet to the Sun in the Solar System. The logo was designed by Alfredo Medinaceli Cabrera. By 1948, the company has established a delivery system.

The store began cutting packaged, bulk items into single pieces and selling them individually; this retail practice is colloquially called tingí-tingî in Filipino. It is the second oldest operating drugstore chain in the country after Southstar Drug, which was established eight years earlier.

Upon the invitation of Ayala Corporation, Mercury Drug opened its second branch in May 1963 at the Corporation's developing commercial center in Makati now known as the Ayala Center. The self-service concept was introduced at that branch, making it today's model for all branches.

In 1965, Mercury Drug established its branch at Plaza Miranda, Quiapo, Manila opposite Quiapo Church, which is currently noted for its large, outdoor LED screen. The company also established 24-hour store schedules in the same year. It was later expanded to Visayas and Mindanao, starting operations there in 1976.

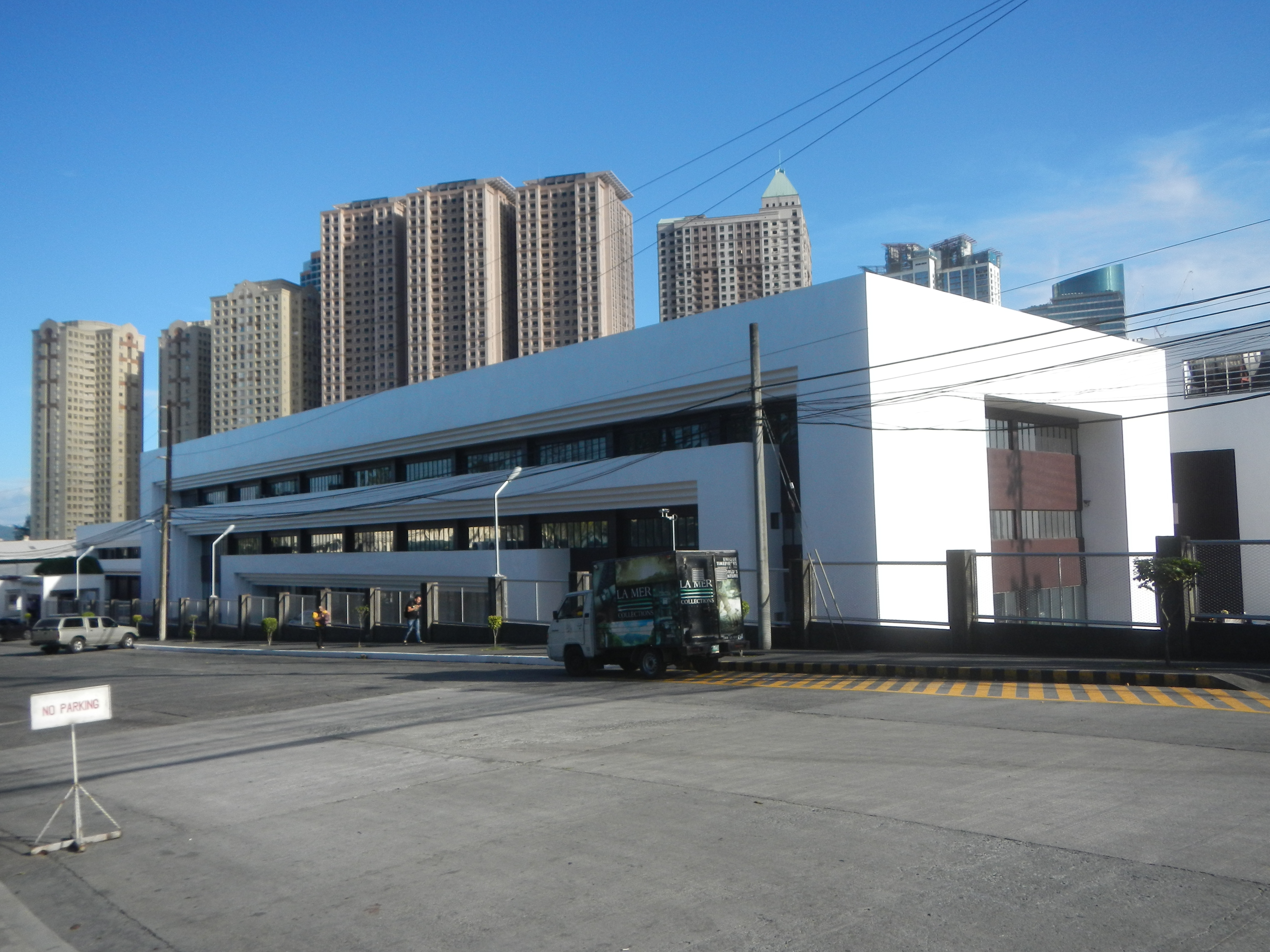
Mercury Drug Corporation head office in Quezon City

In 1981, Mercury Drug's new warehouse was inaugurated. The following year, it inaugurated its new head office in Quezon City.

In 2001, Trade and Industry Secretary Mar Roxas described Mercury drug as a "near monopoly" and said it has 70 percent share of the domestic market though it faces competition from Southstar Drug, Rose Pharmacy and the SM-owned Watsons Philippine franchise.

As of 2010, the company has an estimated 50 percent share of the local pharmaceutical retail market. By 2012, Mercury Drug Stores have made drive-thru pharmacies. By 2015, the company's share in retail increased from 50 percent with competitors such as Watsons getting a 6 percent share of the market.

As of 2017, Mercury Drug has reportedly over 1,000 branches across the country. In the early 2010s, it opened a new building, MDC100, located in Eastwood City, Quezon City.

=== Urban legends ===
There have been urban legends on why Mercury Drug does not have stores inside SM Malls. One legend claims that Henry Sy, a shoe salesman and later the founder of SM Supermalls, was denied a rental space to sell shoes at Mercury Drug, while also claiming that Sy remembered this and as a result, secured Watsons as the pharmacy for his malls. Another legend claims that Sy was selling footwear in front of a Mercury Drug store as a sidewalk vendor and was shooed away by drugstore's security guards. The story also adds that years later, Mercury Drug had allegedly asked to rent a space at SM malls but was "rejected" and "banned" because Sy had remembered the incident of being driven off by guards.

Sy was silent about the truthfulness of these urban legends. In 2002, his daughter, Teresita Sy-Coson, wrote The Philippine Star and stated that her father and Mariano Que were "good friends and this friendship extends to family members." Furthermore, she said that the two companies could not agree on rental rates, which is the "only reason" why SM malls don’t have Mercury Drug stores. Likewise, in an official statement, Mercury Drug stated that they have "a high regard for Mr. Henry Sy and the SM Enterprise" and that they "respect each other's business endeavors and maintain a friendly attitude toward each other."

== Subsidiaries ==
=== Tropical Hut ===
Mercury Drug is the owner of the food chain Tropical Hut. President Benigno Aquino III considered hamburgers his comfort food and usually visited its branch at Jaka Plaza along Sucat Road in Parañaque because it was his favorite restaurant.
