= John Gokongwei =

Filipino businessman

- 吳奕輝
- Born: John Robinson Lim Gokongwei, Jr. 11 August 1926; Xiamen, Fujian, Republic of China
- Died: 9 November 2019 (aged 93); Manila, Philippines
- Resting place: Manila Memorial Park – Sucat, Paranaque, Philippines
- Education: De La Salle University (MBA)
- Occupations: Businessman, investor, philanthropist, banker
- Known for: Founder and chairman emeritus of JG Summit Holdings
- Spouse: Elizabeth Yu (m. 1958)
- Children: 6, (including Lance and Robina)
- Father: John Gokongwei Sr.

Chinese name
- Traditional Chinese: 吳奕輝
- Simplified Chinese: 吴奕辉
Transcriptions
Standard Mandarin
- Hanyu Pinyin: Wú Yìhuī
Southern Min
- Hokkien POJ: Gô͘ E̍k-hui
- Website: www.jgsummit.com.ph

John Robinson Lim Gokongwei Jr. (traditional Chinese: 吳奕輝; simplified Chinese: 吴奕辉; Pe̍h-ōe-jī: Gô͘ E̍k-hui; pinyin: Wú Yìhuī; 11 August 1926 – 9 November 2019) was a Filipino banker, businessman, investor, and philanthropist. His conglomerate company JG Summit Holdings, Inc., had an extensive panoply of business and investment holdings across the Filipino economy, including shipping, telecommunications, retail, financial services, petrochemicals, real estate, utilities, aviation, food, beverages, and livestock farming.

== Early life ==
Gokongwei was born in the island city of Xiamen, China to John Gokongwei Sr. and Juanita Márquez Lim, both pure ethnic Chinese. His father was a scion of a wealthy Cebu-based family with ancestral ties to China's Minnanese Fujian province, around the urban center Xiamen. Gokongwei Sr. ran multiple movie theaters which the young John frequented with friends. His great-grandfather (1859–1921; simplified Chinese: 吴文𬶐; traditional Chinese: 吳文鮡; pinyin: Wú Wénzhào; Pe̍h-ōe-jī: Gô͘ Bûn-thiâu), a young peddler from China, was Hispanized as Pedro Singson Gotiaoco (simplified Chinese: 吴𬶐哥; traditional Chinese: 吳鮡哥; Pe̍h-ōe-jī: Gô͘ Thiâu-ko) and became one of the Philippines' most prominent Chinese Filipinos. At one year old, Gokongwei was brought to Cebu to join the rest of his family and grew up entirely in Forbes Park, Cebu City.

Gokongwei attended the basic education department of University of San Carlos (USC) for primary school (graduating valedictorian) and high school under a scholarship.

The family fortune, including their home and Gokongwei's private Chinese lessons and violin rehearsals, was lost after the passing of his father to typhoid in 1939. Gokongwei was 13 years old when World War II (1939–1945) just broke out. During these difficult years, he had to make ends meet by initially supporting his family by peddling items along the streets of Cebu from his bicycle. From the years 1943 to 1945, or between the ages of 17 and 19, he became a merchant trader using a wooden boat, taking his goods to Dalahican, Lucena by sea and then to Manila by truck.

Gokongwei did not attend college, but was always passionate about reading. He later took a special dispensation to attend De La Salle University (DLSU) to obtain an MBA needed for business. In 1977, Gokongwei earned his Master of Business Administration from DLSU at the age of 51, without fear of learning late, even after his financial success. A decade later, he attended a 14-week advanced management program at Harvard to meet important businessmen and people. Gokongwei later received an honor causa Doctor of Science in Business & Enterprise Development in 2004 from University of San Carlos.

== Business career ==
After World War II, he started his own shipping company called Amasia Trading, which imported flour, onions, fruits, used clothing, old newspapers, and magazines from the United States into the Philippines.

In the early 1950s, along with his brothers and sisters who temporarily stayed in and returned from China due to hardship in the war, he started to import cigarettes and whiskey too. By 1957, seeing that trading would always generate low margins of profit and would always be dependent on the whims of government policies, the family concern shifted towards industrial manufacturing. With a loan of 500,000 pesos from Albino Sycip, then chairman of China Bank, and Dee K. Chiong, Gokongwei established a corn milling plant producing glucose and corn starch. The first company in the Gokongwei Summit Holdings Company was born. It was named Universal Corn Products (which later evolved into his even larger corporate conglomerate, Universal Robina Corporation) famous for its Panda Corn Starch marquee. San Miguel Corporation was a big customer of the company. It caused a price war and the closure of one corn starch company, which led to the dismissal of a young chemical engineer named Lucio Tan. Tan later jested with Gokongwei that he costed Tan his employment.

In 1961, he established Consolidated Food Corporation (later known as CFC Corporation, which later merged with Universal Robina Corporation), which launched its instant coffee brand Blend 45.

In November 1990, Gokongwei incorporated JG Summit Holdings was floated as a publicly listed holding company on the Manila Stock Exchange. In March 1996, his airline, Cebu Pacific Air began operations. In 2010, the airline underwent major refleeting with a $3 billion order with Airbus. From 2003, his telecommunications company Digital Telecommunications Philippines spent nearly $800 million for its mobile carrier, Sun Cellular, which was the third-largest mobile operator in the Philippines at that time before selling to the PLDT group for $1.7 billion.

In 2013, his company bought the stake of San Miguel Corporation in Meralco, Philippines's largest power distributor for close to $1.8 billion. In July 2014, Universal Robina acquired Griffin's Foods from Pacific Equity Partners, a New Zealand food producer for $609 million.

In 2014, Gokongwei attempted to mastermind a $1 billion corporate takeover of United Industrial Corporation Ltd (UIC), a Singaporean property giant of which he owned in excess of 30%. UIC controls Singapore Land, which is one of the biggest property landholders in Singapore.

He also owned Robinsons Retail Holdings, Inc. and Robinsons Land Corporation.

The Gokongwei family controls over $20 billion of combined market capitalization for all the companies they own.

In February 2008, Forbes Asia magazine's first Heroes of Philanthropy list included four Filipinos – Gokongwei, Jaime Zobel de Ayala, Ramón del Rosario Jr. and Oscar López. The list was composed of four philanthropists each from 13 selected countries and territories in Asia.

== Publications ==
On 29 August 2007, at the Ateneo de Manila University (ADMU), Gokongwei's biography, John L. Gokongwei Jr.: The Path of Entrepreneurship, by the university's Dr. Marites A. Khanser, was launched, and it narrated the "riches-to-rags-to-riches" story of the tai-pan. Gokongwei stated that entrepreneurship is a way out of poverty. Khanser's book also enumerated the Nine Rules of business success that Gokongwei followed since he was still a young businessman. In 2002 Gokongwei donated P200-million to the undergraduate school of management. He also gave donations to University of San Carlos, Xavier School, De La Salle University, Sacred Heart School – Ateneo de Cebu, and Immaculate Conception Academy (ICA).

== Personal life ==
Gokongwei married Elizabeth Yu in 1958 and had six children (one son and five daughters) – Robina, then Lance, Hope, Lisa, Faith, and Marcia. All his children play an active role in the Gokongwei group.

His eldest daughter, Robina, heads the operations of Robinsons Retail, currently as a chairman after serving as the president and COO, and then as CEO of the company from 1997 until 2024. His only son, Lance, currently leads the group as president and CEO of JG Summit.

He was a second cousin once removed of Andrew Gotianun Sr., the founder of Filinvest Development Corporation. Gokongwei's great-grandfather was a half brother of Gotianun's grandfather. He is also second cousins with the Gaisano family, with Doña Modesta Singson-Gaisano being his grandaunt (his grandfather's sister) which he used to call in Hokkien Chinese: 老阿姑; Pe̍h-ōe-jī: Lǎu Á-ko͘; lit. 'Old Auntie', under his great-grandfather, Don Pedro Singson Gotiaoco

In addition, he was a first cousin once removed of Nikki Coseteng. His mother was the half sister of Coseteng’s maternal grandfather.

== Final years and legacy ==
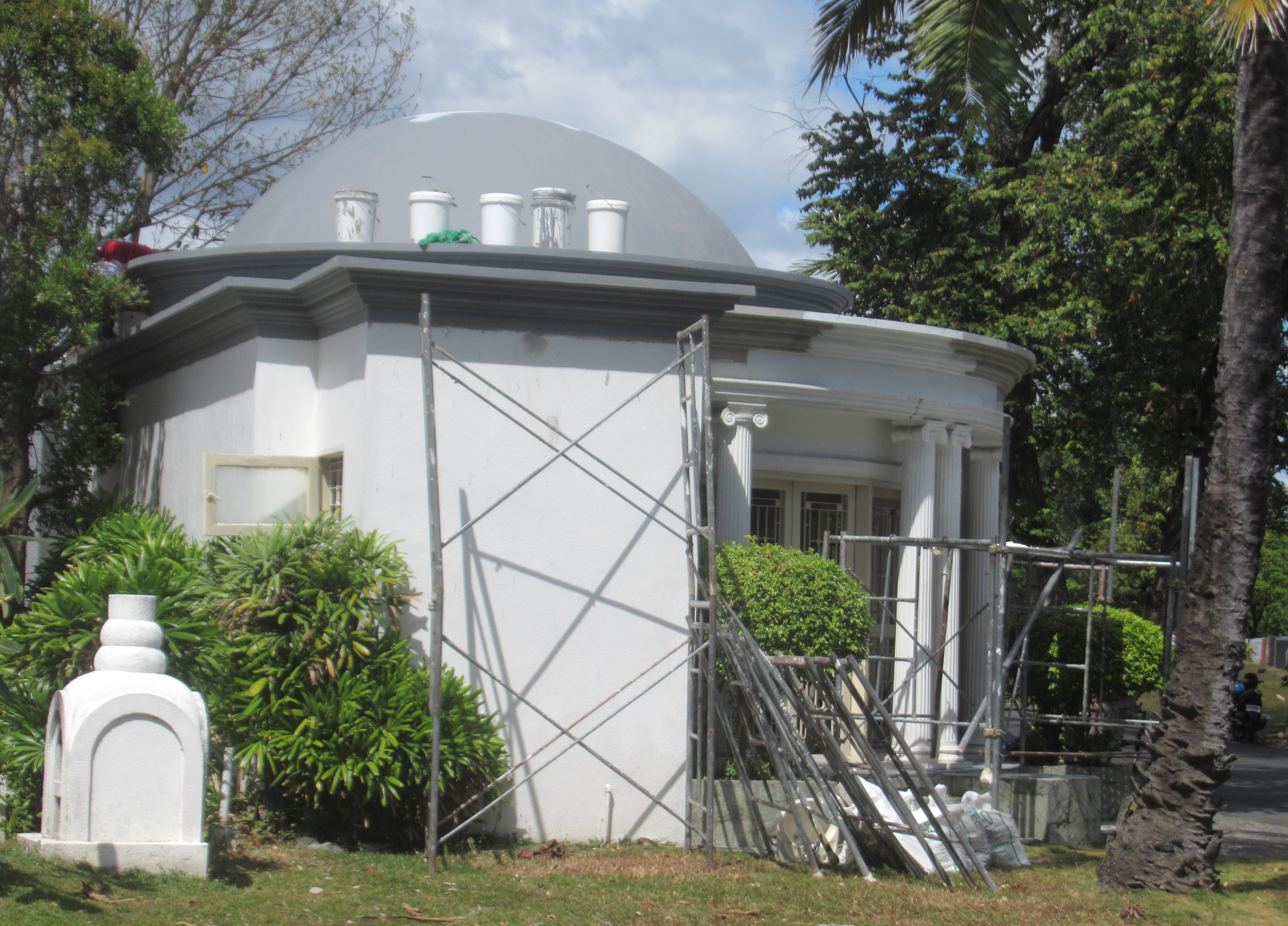
Gokongwei's family mausoleum at Manila Memorial Park – Sucat.

Gokongwei retired in 2016 to pass on the baton of the conglomerate to Lance and Robina. Gokongwei died peacefully at Manila Doctors Hospital on 9 November 2019, 11:41 pm, at the age of 93. Exactly one week after his death, his widow Elizabeth Yu Gokongwei died at the age of 85.

DLSU and ADMU have named their premier undergraduate colleges after him for his significant contributions to the schools: the Gokongwei College of Engineering and the John Gokongwei School of Management (JGSOM) respectively.
