= Robina Gokongwei =

Filipino-Chinese businesswoman

Robina Gokongwei-Pe
- Born: July 15, 1962 (age 64)
- Education: University of the Philippines; New York University
- Occupations: Businesswoman; investor; philanthropist
- Spouse: Perry Pe (m. 1993)
- Children: 2
- Parent(s): John Gokongwei; Elizabeth Yu

Robina Gokongwei-Pe (born July 15, 1962) is a Filipino businesswoman who is currently the chairperson of Robinsons Retail. She is the daughter of late tycoon John Gokongwei and Elizabeth Yu-Gokongwei.

== Business ==
Gokongwei served as the president and COO of Robinsons Retail in 1997 and was then appointed as president and CEO of the company in 2018 before stepping down from both positions and transitioning to chairman on January 1, 2025.

She is also a director of JG Summit Holdings, Robinsons Land, Cebu Pacific, and the now defunct Robinsons Bank Corporation. She is a trustee and the secretary of the Gokongwei Brothers Foundation, Inc. and a trustee of the Immaculate Concepcion Academy Scholarship Fund.

Gokongwei formerly wrote a column at The Philippine Star named Chicken Feed.

== Kidnapping victim ==
Gokongwei was once kidnapped in the 1970s, only to be saved later by a unit of the Metrocom Intelligence and Security Group (MISG) led by Ping Lacson. When Lacson ran in 2022, she supported his campaign.

== Sports ==
Gokongwei is a sponsor and patron for her alma mater's men's basketball team, the UP Fighting Maroons.

== Personal life ==
Gokongwei is married to Perry Pe, a lawyer from Ateneo de Manila University. They have a son, Justin.

== Robinsons Galleria urban legend ==
Gokongwei has on several occasions poked fun at a long-running urban legend claiming that a "half-snake, half-man" creature believed to be her twin sibling lives in the department store at Robinsons Galleria by posing with snake decorations and wearing a snake-themed headdress at a public event.
