= Ayala Malls Vertis North =

Shopping mall in Quezon City, Philippines

- Location: Quezon City, Metro Manila, Philippines
- Coordinates: 14°39′06″N 121°02′10″E
- Address: Lux Drive, Vertis North Complex, Barangay Bagong Pag-asa
- Opened: June 9, 2017; 9 years ago
- Developer: Ayala Malls
- Manager: Ayala Malls
- Num. of stores: 200+
- Floor area: 106,040 m^{2} (1,141,400 sq ft)
- Floors: Mall: 5 (including Lower Ground Level / B1); Basement Parking: 4 (from B1)
- Public transit: North Avenue; E North Avenue; Future: MMS North Avenue
- Website: www.ayalamalls.com.ph

Ayala Malls Vertis North (formerly Vertis North Superblock as working name and Vertis North Mall) is a shopping mall in Vertis North Complex, Quezon City, Philippines developed and managed by Ayala Malls. It is the second mall in the Vertis North township complex built by Ayala Malls inside Triangle Park; the first being Trinoma that was opened in 2007. This mall sees 13,700 visitors daily. The mall opened on June 9, 2017, after several unknown delays.

Tagged as the "first millennial mall in the Philippines," it is Ayala Malls' fourth largest mall in Quezon City, after Trinoma, U.P. Town Center, and Fairview Terraces.

== Features ==
The mall has four retail clusters with four levels (except Southeast cluster with three levels and the North cluster having a basement access to Supermarket), flanking a central garden and events area called Green Strip. The mall has dedicated zones, known as Korea Town, Japan Town and Urban Turf. Three of the four retail clusters serve as the podiums of the 22-story Vertis North Corporate Center that is built on top of the retail clusters.

A new large-format cinema (also known as A-Giant Screen), known to be the largest cinema screen in the country, is complemented by two digital cinemas with all-reclining seats (also known as A-Luxe Seats), featuring 400 regular seats and 24 reclining seats in the skybox. The mall features Merkado Supermarket as its anchor supermarket, that had a target opening date in August 2017 but it was delayed to December 14, 2017.

The mall was originally intended to have a Wellworth Department Store, but it was not pushed through as Wellworth was bought by the owners of Metro Gaisano Department Store. Instead, it is occupied by fashion and lifestyle tenants.

Despite being located on the same complex as TriNoma, it is not directly connected to the said mall, though a covered walkway was built from the Mindanao Avenue open carpark of TriNoma to the mall and estate to provide access. The mall sits beside the spur line of the MRT-3 and has basement parking levels, unlike TriNoma, whose structure sits directly on top of the MRT-3 depot.

Outside of the mall, an events place named ABS-CBN Vertis Tent was opened on July 24, 2017, in partnership with media conglomerate ABS-CBN Corporation. It has a seating capacity of 1,200 for shows by local and foreign artists. The tent was demolished in 2020, partly due to the non-renewal of ABS-CBN's franchise by the government.

== Notable events ==
British band The Vamps along with British pop trio New Hope Club held their Manila show for The Vamps' "Middle Of The Night Tour" last October 6, 2017, at Luna Drive which is the main road for the mall; the road was closed for the day to support the temporary arena-like stage for the concert.

== See also ==
- Ayala Malls
- Trinoma
- SM North EDSA
