= Seda Hotels =

Hotel brand in the Philippines

Seda
- Product type: Hotel chain
- Current owner: Ayala Land Hotels and Resorts
- Country: Philippines
- Introduced: 2012
- Markets: Philippines
- Website: sedahotels.com

Seda (formerly known as Kukun, occasionally referred to as Seda Hotels) is a Philippine brand of hotels owned and operated by Ayala Land Hotels and Resorts, a subsidiary of Ayala Corporation. The first hotel under the Seda brand began operations in 2012 with the opening of Seda BGC at the Bonifacio Global City in Taguig, Metro Manila, Philippines. The hotel chain has 11 branches as of 2020, all located in the Philippines.

== History ==
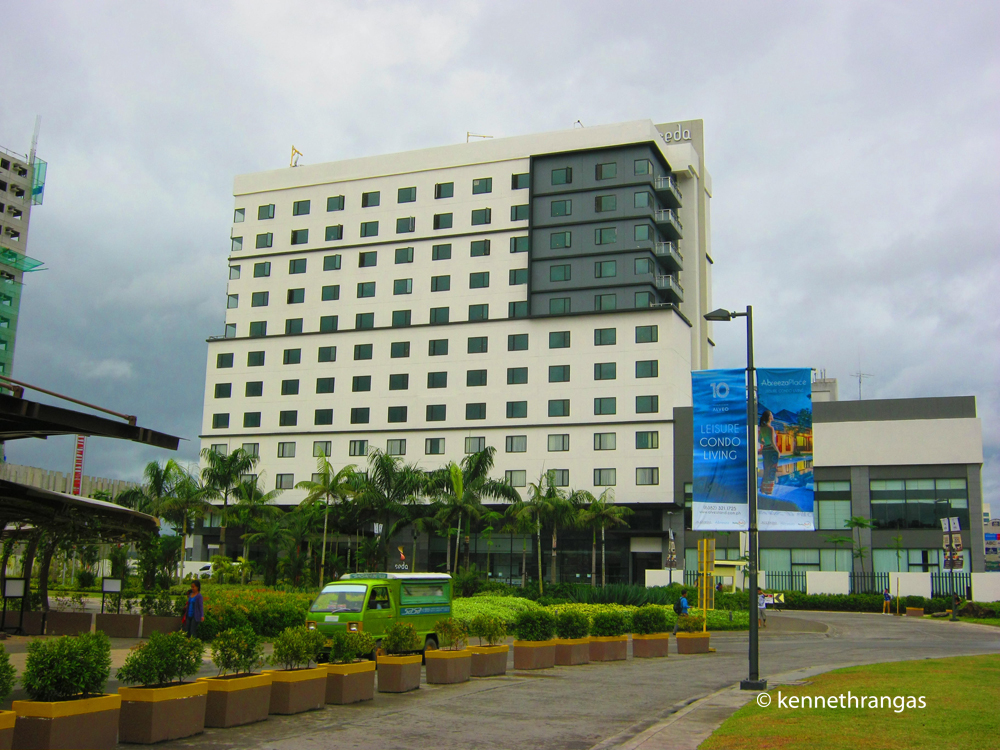
Seda Abreeza in Davao City.

Seda Hotels was established in 2012 as one of the hotel brands of Ayala Land Hotels and Resorts, which is a subsidiary of Ayala Land, one of the companies owned by the Ayala Corporation of billionaire entrepreneurs Jaime and Fernando Zobel de Ayala. It was meant to be urban lifestyle hotel chain catering to business travelers and upper income visitors but located near Ayala Land's chain of shopping malls, Ayala Malls. The hotel was originally called Kukun. Ayala Land had originally preferred the name Cocoon, but settled for the stylised Kukun as the former had already been taken by another Manila boutique hotel. The name of the hotel comes from the Tagalog word for silk. All of its hotels were designed by Filipino architect Conrad Onglao.

The first Seda Hotel opened in December 2012 at the Bonifacio Global City (BGC), a central business district. The 179-room hotel is located close to Ayala Mall's high-end shopping centers such as Bonifacio High Street, Serendra and Market! Market!. The second Seda Hotel, the 150-room Seda Centrio, opened in the same year in Cagayan de Oro beside the Centrio shopping mall owned by Ayala Malls.

In January 2013, the hotel brand was renamed from Kukun to Seda.

In June 2013, a third branch of Seda Hotels opened in Davao City, the 186-room Seda Abreeza, located near Ayala Malls Abreeza. A fourth branch, the 150-room Seda Nuvali, opened in March 2014 inside Ayala Land's Nuvali estate in Santa Rosa, Laguna. The fifth branch, the 152-room Seda Atria, opened in March 2015 near Ayala Malls Atria in Iloilo City in time for the 2015 Asia-Pacific Economic Cooperation Summit events that were held there.

In January 2014, Seda Hotels became the first hotel chain in the Philippines to undergo accreditation for Certified Guest Service Professionals (CGSP) from the American Hotels and Lodging Educational Institute.

Seda opened its sixth hotel and its first hotel in Quezon City, the 438-room Seda Vertis North, at Ayala Land's Vertis North development at the city's Triangle Park district in April 2017. The seventh Seda Hotel, the 154-room Seda Capitol Central, located within Ayala Land's Capitol Central development in Bacolod, Negros Occidental, opened in April 2017.

In October 2017, Ayala Land terminated its 20-year contract with Marriott Hotels & Resorts to operate a hotel within its property adjacent to Ayala Center Cebu, which led to the closure of Cebu City Marriott Hotel on 1 January 2018. The hotel opened eight months later on 19 August 2018 as Seda Ayala Center Cebu, the eighth Seda hotel, after its refurbishment to conform to the Seda brand. Another Seda hotel, the 214-room Seda Central Bloc, opened at the Cebu IT Park in February 2020 as the 11th hotel in the chain.

In September 2018, Seda opened its ninth hotel and first beach resort in El Nido, Palawan. The 153-room Seda Lio is located within Ayala Land's Lio Tourism Estate in Barangay Cadlao. It is located close to the Lio Airport which Ayala Corporation owns and operates to bring tourists to the estate via its airline, AirSWIFT. Seda opened a second tower of Seda BGC in June 2019. The 342-room tower brought Seda BGC to a total inventory of 521 rooms.

On 2 November 2019, the 10th Seda Hotel and the first branch to serve as serviced apartments, the Seda Residences Makati, opened at the first tower of the Ayala North Exchange Complex on the corner of Amorsolo and Salcedo Streets in Makati, Metro Manila. The serviced apartments has 293 rooms, restaurant, bar, and a swimming pool, and is located close to Glorietta and Greenbelt shopping malls owned by Ayala Malls.

== Upcoming hotels ==
In 2017 and 2018, Ayala Land announced that it is investing ₱10 to 15 billion to expand its Seda Hotels chain to 11 branches and 3,268 rooms by 2020. The new branches announced are located near Ayala Corporation properties, particularly Seda Circuit Makati, Seda Arca South in Taguig, Seda Manila Bay beside Ayala Malls Manila Bay, and the second tower of Seda Nuvali.

The flagship branch of Seda Hotel was supposed to be built at One Ayala, named Seda One Ayala, which was slated to open in 2025. However, it was later cancelled and its operator, One Makati Residential Ventures, Inc., was restructured as Seda College, Inc. It was soon replaced by Canopy by Hilton Makati, which is slated to open in 2026.
