= Seda Vertis North =

Hotel in Quezon City, Philippines

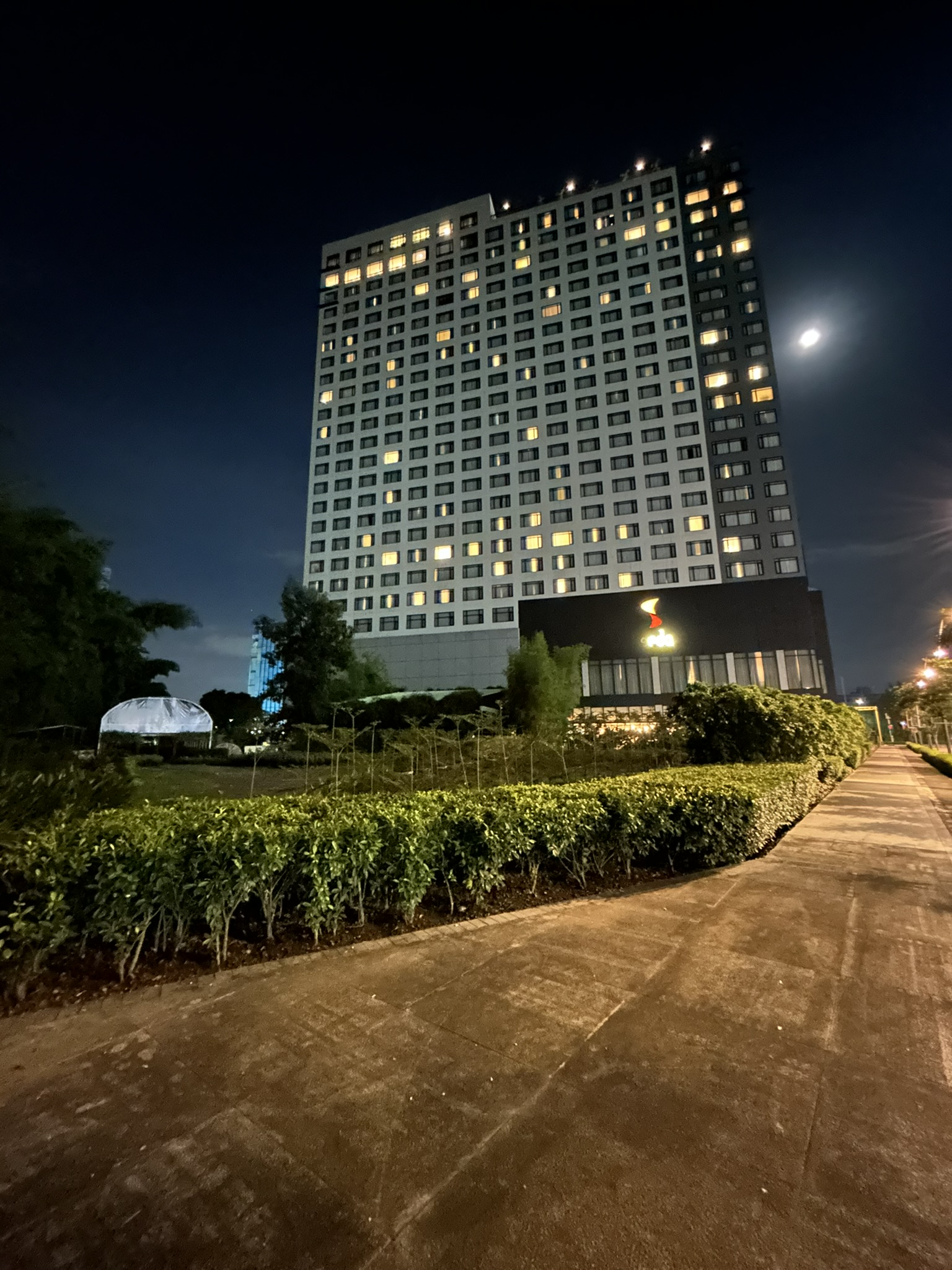
- Seda Vertis North at night (2023)
- Interactive map of the Seda Vertis North area
- Hotel chain: Seda Hotels

General information
- Status: Completed
- Location: Astra Corner Lux Drives, Vertis North, Quezon City, Philippines
- Coordinates: 14°39′1.7″N 121°2′8.5″E
- Construction started: 2014
- Opening: April 23, 2017
- Owner: Ayala Land Hotels and Resorts Corp.
- Operator: Ayala Land Hotels and Resorts Corp.

Technical details
- Floor count: 24

Design and construction
- Developer: Ayala Land

Other information
- Number of rooms: 438

Website
- vertisnorth.sedahotels.com

Seda Vertis North is a hotel in Quezon City, Metro Manila, Philippines. It is part of the Seda Hotel chain of AyalaLand Hotels and Resorts of Ayala Land which was established in 2012.

== History ==
Seda Vertis North is part of Ayala Land's mixed-used development called Vertis North. The groundbreaking for Vertis North's commercial phase which includes the hotel took place in late 2013. The facility was meant to be built as a "city-center type" of hotel.

The Seda Vertis North, started partial operations on April 23, 2017 when it had its soft opening. It became the sixth hotel under the Seda hotel chain. It had its grand opening, months later, on October 11, 2017.

== Facilities ==
Seda Vertis North operates inside a 24-storey building and has 438 rooms. Its rooms are categorized as either deluxe rooms, club Rooms, premier rooms, and suites. The hotel features the 160 m^{2} (1,700 sq ft) Presidential Suite which is often booked by business executives.

Other facilities include a 700 m^{2} (7,500 sq ft) ballroom and a 390 m^{2} (4,200 sq ft) pool with a bar. The hotel also host a 250-person-capacity Italian-Japanese-Filipino restaurant called Misto and the Straight Up Roofdeck bar.

The hotel building of Seda Vertis North received a LEED-Gold certification in 2019 for its green building design and operation standards. The hotel's facilities and services have also been given a five-star rating by the Department of Tourism based on its National Accommodation Standards for hotels within the first year of Seda Vertis North's operation.
