= Trinoma =

Shopping mall in the Philippines

- Aerial view of the Trinoma mall complex (2026)
- Location: Quezon City, Metro Manila, Philippines
- Coordinates: 14°39′11.1″N 121°02′00.3″E
- Address: Epifanio de los Santos Avenue (EDSA/C-4 Road) Corner, North Avenue, Bagong Pag-asa, Quezon City, Philippines
- Opened: May 16, 2007; 19 years ago
- Developer: Ayala Land
- Manager: Ayala Malls
- Owner: Ayala Corporation
- Num. of stores: 550
- Floor area: 235,000 m^{2} (2,530,000 sq ft)
- Floors: 4 levels (8 levels for the car park area)
- Parking: 8,000 slots (3,500 in car park)
- Public transit: North Avenue; E North Avenue; 18 33 TriNoma; 8 TriNoma; Future: MMS North Triangle Common Station
- Website: TriNoma

Trinoma (stylized as TriNoma, which is syllabic abbreviation of "Triangle North of Manila," and also known as Trinoma by Ayala Malls) is a large shopping mall in Quezon City, Philippines, owned by property development firm Ayala Land. Opened on May 16, 2007, the mall is located on the east side of Epifanio de los Santos Avenue (C-4 segment) in Quezon City, giving significant market competition to the nearby SM North EDSA as one of the largest malls in Metro Manila. The mall averages about 124,000 visitors per day. It is also one of two malls that will be serving Ayala Land's Vertis North township, which is located beside the mall, along with a new lifestyle block mall Ayala Malls Vertis North, similar to Greenbelt in Makati, which was also developed by Ayala Malls.

== History ==
The MRT Line 3 consortium composed of Fil-Estate Holdings and Ayala Land decided to make the depot underground rather than a regular depot similar to LRT Line 1 due to its commercial viability as a shopping mall. When the MRT Line 3 began operations in December 1999, the construction of the mall was not immediately undertaken due to lack of funding. The North Triangle Depot Commercial Corporation was incorporated in 2001 with Fil-Estate spearheading the development and Ayala Land as minority stockholder.

From December 1999 to December 2004, the depot was idle space until an agreement was signed between Ayala Land and the Fil-Estate Group with the former buying the latter's 30.89% stake in the North Triangle Depot Commercial Corporation for ₱600.1 million, and in exchange a land situated along Ayala Avenue, Makati and other shares.

Ayala Land started constructing Trinoma in June 2005 with the retail development initially known as the North Triangle Commercial Center or North Triangle Mall. The name of the mall was later changed to "Trinoma" inspired by the redevelopment of industrial district TriBeCa.

Logo from 2007 to 2026

Trinoma was officially launched in a private ceremony on April 25, 2007. It was inaugurated by officials of Ayala Land, and the Quezon City government, led by then-Mayor Feliciano Belmonte Jr.

According to Ayala Land Inc. president Jaime Ayala, the mall will service all market segments but will specifically cater to Quezon City’s high-end consumers.

The soft opening was originally slated for May 3, 2007, but was delayed by structural elements that were yet to be finished. It finally opened to the public on its soft opening on May 16, 2007. Its grand opening was held on October 16, 2007 (three days before the explosion of its sister mall Glorietta in Makati City), with President Gloria Macapagal Arroyo and Vice President Noli de Castro in attendance.

The mall was the first building constructed in the 62.3-hectare (154-acre) Triangle Exchange district of Triangle Park and of Ayala Land's Vertis North project. Vertis North is within the 250.6-hectare (619-acre) Quezon City Central Business District (also known as Triangle Park) to redevelop the areas of North Triangle (North Avenue, EDSA, Quezon Avenue), East Triangle (East Avenue, EDSA, Quezon Avenue) and the Veterans Memorial Medical Center (VMMC) property (North Avenue).

=== Renovations and The Exchange ===
Trinoma commenced renovations in the first quarter of 2024 and is expected to be completed by the fourth quarter of 2025. The mall's North Avenue Wing was also be expanded to and became The Exchange at TriNoma, a mixed-use development consisting of retail spaces, offices, parking, and a transport terminal aligned with the construction of the adjacent North Triangle Common Station. The Exchange would add 40,000 square meters of gross floor area. The expansion opened around October 30, 2026.

=== Cinema renovation ===
The mall's Cinemas 3 to 6 were closed for renovation on June 23, 2024. Cinemas 3 and 4 reopened on December 25, 2024, coinciding with the start of the 2024 Metro Manila Film Festival, followed by Cinema 6 on February 13, 2025, and Cinema 5 as an A-Luxe Cinema on March 19, 2025. Cinema 7 was eventually renovated and subsequently reopened as an A-Giant Cinema in July 2025.

== Facilities ==
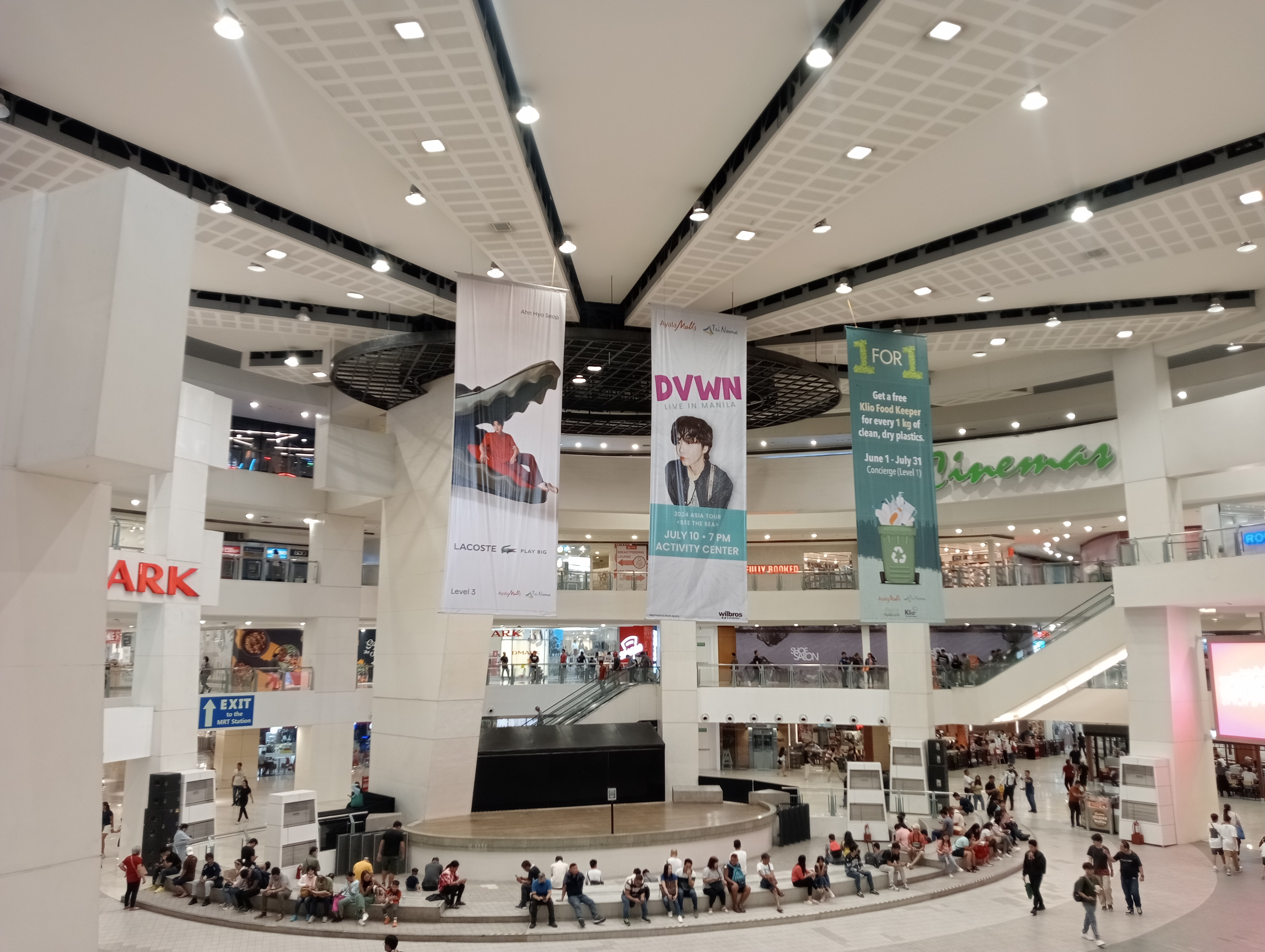
Activity center

Trinoma is located at the corner of EDSA and North Avenue in Quezon City. Located in "North Triangle", the mall is bound by three major thoroughfares, namely, North Avenue, EDSA and Mindanao Avenue extension. Located on a 20-hectare (49-acre) parcel of land, Trinoma has a gross floor area of 235,000 square meters (2,530,000 sq ft), which includes the mall's major anchor, The Landmark supermarket and department store and the recently opened expansion wing in 2026 which is The Exchange.

It is directly connected to the North Avenue MRT station as the mall itself sits atop the Line 3 Depot. It will also be connected to the future North Triangle Common Station. A pedestrian overpass has also been constructed to connect with SM North EDSA but it is currently closed to give way for the MRT-7 station.

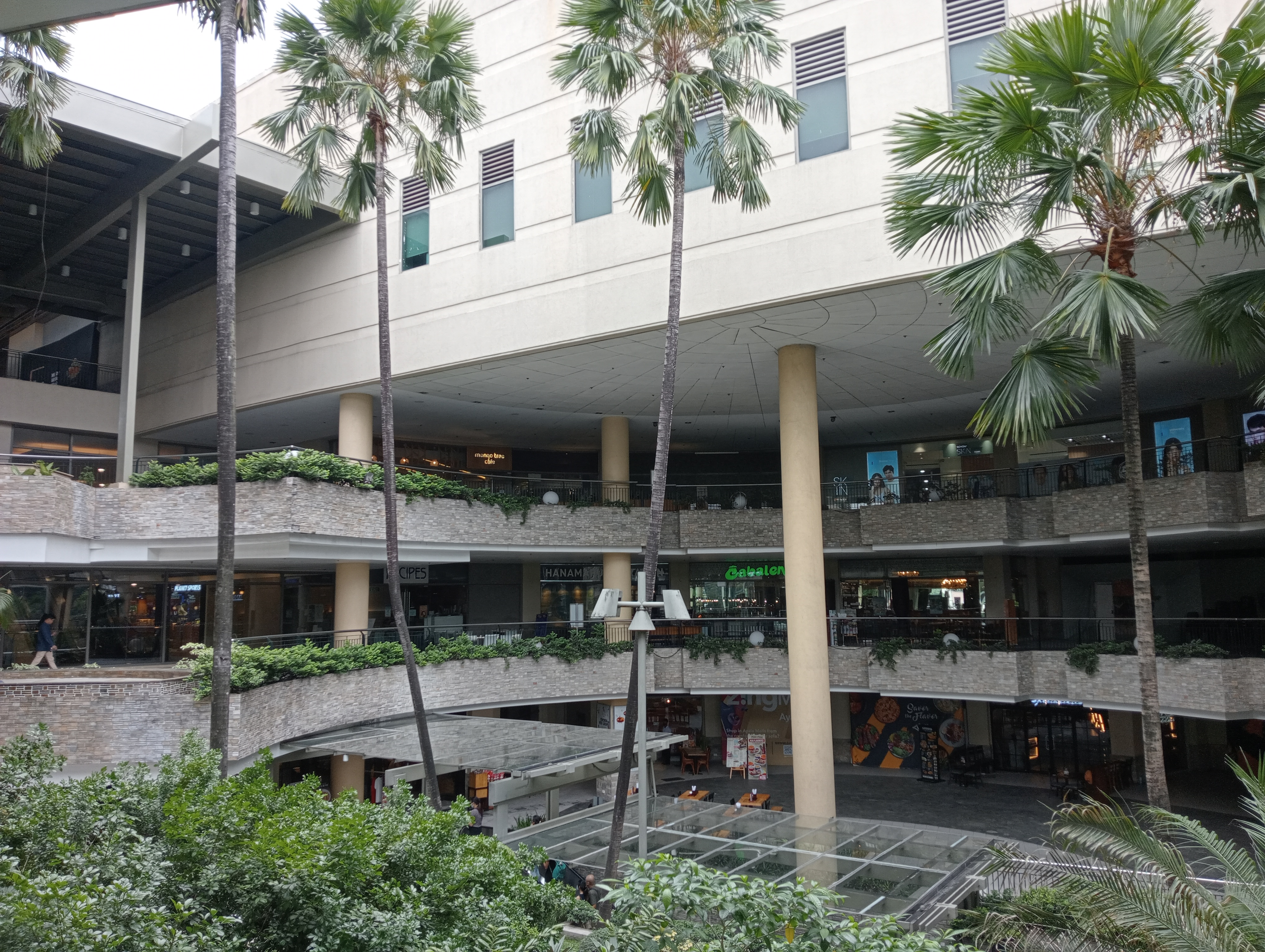
Al fresco restaurants surrounding Trinoma Park

The mall is composed of four major levels with two minor ones on ground and on grade. The mall is characterized by alf resco areas punctuated with water features and landscaping. These water features flow into pools at the Trinoma Park, a green area that sits atop the mall. The Trinoma Park is a two-level park spanning a total of one hectare (2.5 acres). It is home to an array of restaurants offering varied cuisines. The Park also houses a stage, surrounded by pools of water, for performances and shows. The Trinoma Park is linked to the mall's third level. The mall has two parking buildings, North Carpark Building and Mindanao Carpark Building, both named after their adjacent avenue. Parking is also available in open areas.

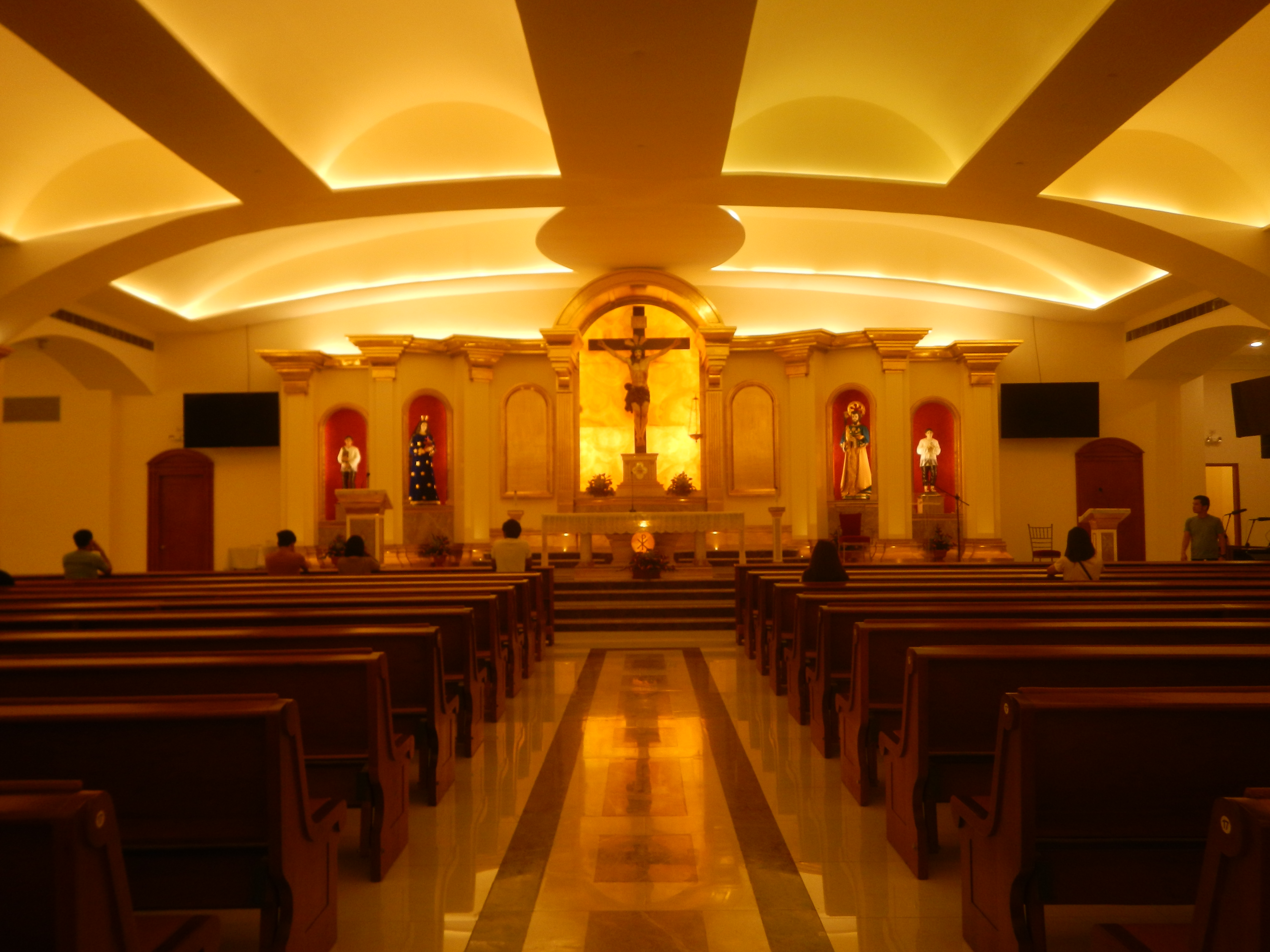
Mary Mother of Hope Chapel, a Roman Catholic chapel located at The Landmark

The mall also houses religious facilities. Two Roman Catholic chapels such as the St. Michael the Archangel Chapel and Mary Mother of Hope Chapel are located inside the mall's second floor and at The Landmark's fourth floor, respectively. New Life North Metro, a Born Again Christian church, is located at the ground floor.

Along with Timezone, it formerly hosted a themed Family Entertainment Center developed by ABS-CBN dubbed as ABS-CBN Studio Experience which features different areas inspired by TV shows aired by the network. It has been permanently closed since 2020 due to the COVID-19 pandemic and the effects of the ABS-CBN franchise renewal controversy. The said arcade was expanded occupying the former space which opened on August 8, 2023, the existing branch closed for renovations and reopened on October 27, 2023, over 16 years since the original branch opened.

== Incidents ==
- On June 2, 2007, a 20-meter-long (66 ft) portion of the mall's ceiling collapsed shortly before 7:00 p.m. PHT.
- In the afternoon of March 13, 2017, a fire broke out in the mall. The fire was first reported at around 2:25 p.m. and was raised to 2nd alarm as of 2:34 p.m., according to an update by TxtFire Philippines. FO1 Joan De Luna of the Tandang Sora fire substation said the fire reportedly started at an appliance warehouse near the MRT station. The Bureau of Fire Protection declared fire out at 6:33 p.m.
- On January 25, 2020, at around 6:00 p.m, a 15-year-old high school student jumped to his death from the 7th floor of the mall's Mindanao Carpark Building. He was rushed to Veterans Memorial Medical Center but was pronounced dead on arrival.
