= Vertis North =

Mixed-use development in Quezon City, Philippines

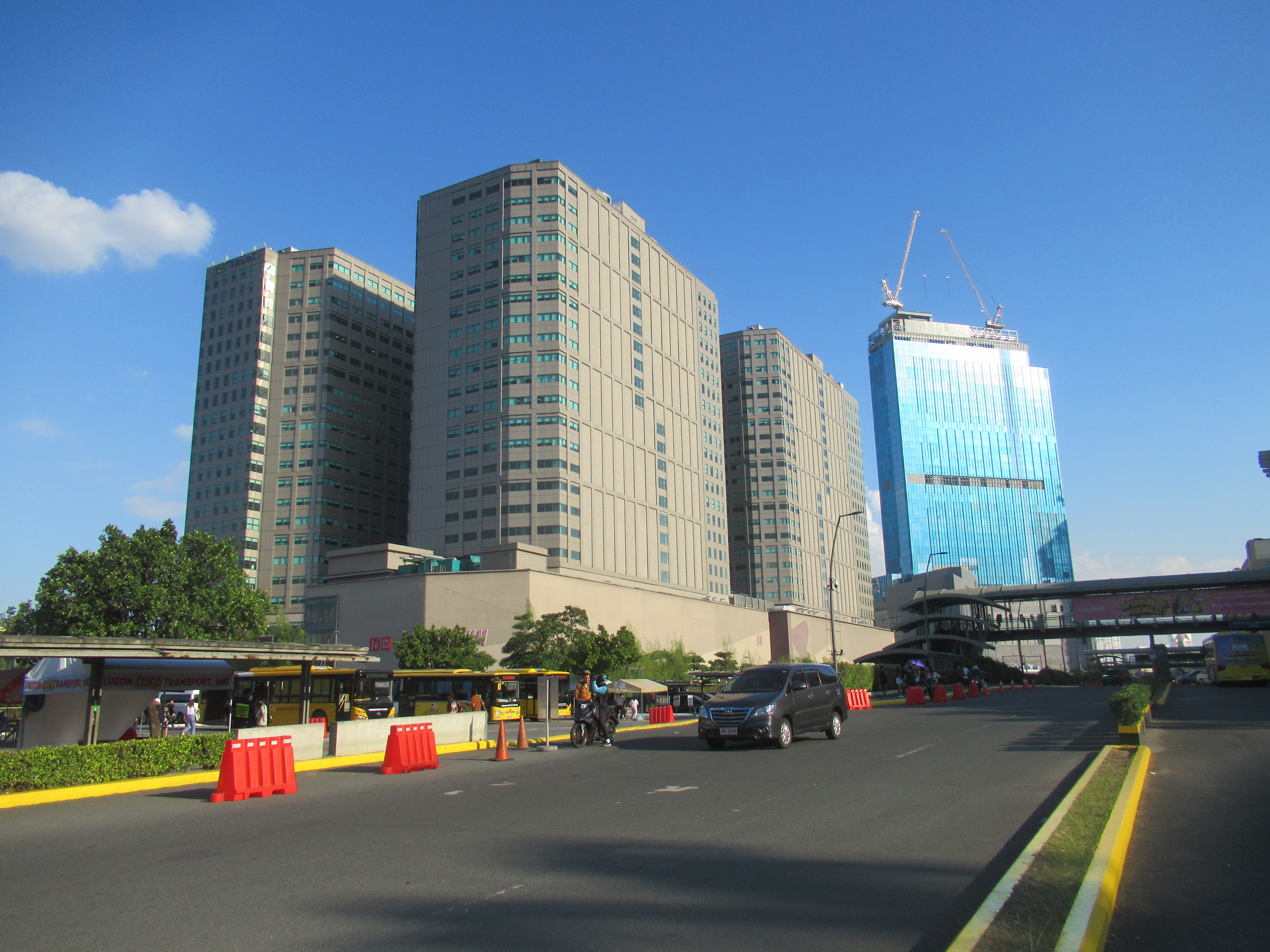
- Buildings in Vertis North, 2023

Project
- Status: Completed (phase 1)
- Developer: Ayala Land
- Website: www.vertisnorth.ph

Physical features
- Transport: North Avenue Station; E North Avenue; 18 33 64 North Edsa; Future: Metro Manila Subway North Avenue Station; North Triangle

Location
- Location in Metro Manila, Philippines
- Coordinates: 14.6521°N 121.0360°E
- Country: Philippines
- Location: Diliman, Quezon City, Metro Manila, Philippines

Area
  - Total: 29 ha (72 acres)

Vertis North is a 29-hectare (72-acre) transit oriented mixed-use development in Quezon City, Metro Manila, Philippines. Rising along key major roads such as EDSA, North Avenue, Mindanao Avenue, and Senator Miriam P. Defensor-Santiago Avenue, the development is a joint venture project between Ayala Land Inc. (ALI) and the National Housing Authority (NHA). Like previous developments of Ayala Land such as the Makati Central Business District, Vertis North has a mix of residential developments similar to Legazpi and Salcedo Villages, office towers, malls, and open spaces which are also similar to the Ayala Triangle Garden and Greenbelt Park. The development is also connected to key transport stations such as the North Avenue Station of the MRT Line 3 and the North Avenue Bus Station of the EDSA Busway, with future potential connections to the Metro Manila Subway through the subway's North Avenue Station, and the North Triangle Common Station, which serves the LRT Line 1 and the MRT Line 7.

Located within the development are key properties such as Trinoma, Ayala Malls Vertis North, the Seda Vertis North, the Vertis North Corporate Center Towers, and the Solaire Resort North.

== History ==
In the aftermath of the opening of Trinoma on May 16, 2007, Ayala Land Inc. (ALI) laid out plans to develop the area on the surrounding area of the Trinoma Mall. The development is also located along the Triangle Exchange District of the Triangle Park central business district. On August 27, 2009, Ayala Land Inc. signed a joint venture agreement with the National Housing Authority (NHA) to develop a 29.1-hectare (72-acre) property as a "priming project of the government and the private sector." The total project cost is estimated to be ₱22 billion, including future development costs and current property value. ALI and NHA will contribute their respective equity share in the joint venture. The NHA is responsible for relocating settlers living in the area.

On July 5, 2012, Ayala Land Inc. (ALI) made an announcement for the development of the Vertis North complex. The company initially invested ₱12 billion for the three-year development of Phase 1 of Vertis North. Phase 1 includes a Kukun Hotel, office buildings for business process outsourcing companies, and Bonifacio High Street-type retail areas in a 7-hectare area.

In October 2015, Bloomberry Resorts Corporation purchased a 15.7-hectare (39-acre) property from the National Housing Authority (NHA) for ₱1.98 billion. The property was eventually developed into Solaire Resort North, which opened on May 25, 2024. This casino hotel has up to 550 rooms and a gaming area with up to 200 gaming tables and as many as 3,000 slot machines.

The first phase, which includes the Ayala Malls Vertis North shopping mall, the Seda Vertis North hotel, and residential projects, was launched in 2017.

== Features ==
Vertis North covers an area of 29 hectares (72 acres). It is surrounded by Epifanio de los Santos Avenue to the west, North Avenue to the north, Senator Miriam P. Defensor-Santiago Avenue (formerly Agham Road) to the east, and Quezon Avenue to the south. More than half of Vertis North's area is allocated for office use.

=== Trinoma ===
Trinoma is a four-storey shopping mall located within the middle of three main roads, namely EDSA, North Avenue, and Mindanao Avenue. The mall stands above the North Avenue Depot of the MRT Line 3 and offers 195,000 m^{2} (2,100,000 sq ft) of retail space. Anchored by Landmark Department Store and Supermarket, Trinoma is home to over 500 shops and serves a variety of retail, dining, leisure, and entertainment brands. The mall also features an activity center, two Roman Catholic churches, an two-level outdoor park named The Trinoma Park, and the Garden Restaurants, which offers al-fresco dining spaces. The mall also features a food court on the second floor and 7 cinema theaters.

=== Ayala Malls Vertis North ===
Ayala Malls Vertis North

The Ayala Malls Vertis North is a five-storey shopping mall located across from Trinoma, with the Mindanao Avenue Open Parking, the MRT 3 Depot Spur Line, and Sola Drive separating the two malls. Ayala Malls Vertis North also occupies the retail levels of the Vertis North Corporate Center Towers and currently has over 200 shops. The mall has 106,040 m^{2} (1,141,400 sq ft) of retail space. It is home to a variety of local and foreign retail shops and dining restaurants separated into three different zones, as well as the mall's anchor supermarket Merkado Supermarket, two cinema theaters, and the Green Strip, an open-air garden and events area.

=== Seda Vertis North ===
The Seda Vertis North is a 24-storey high-end hotel under the Seda Hotels brand, located along the corner of Sola and Luxe Drives. Seda Vertis North is among the largest hotels in northern Metro Manila with 438 rooms, and features three restaurants, which includes a rooftop bar at the 24th floor, six meeting and function halls, a spa room, a fitness center, a kiddie playground, and a swimming pool with a poolside outdoor events venue.

=== Vertis North Corporate Center ===
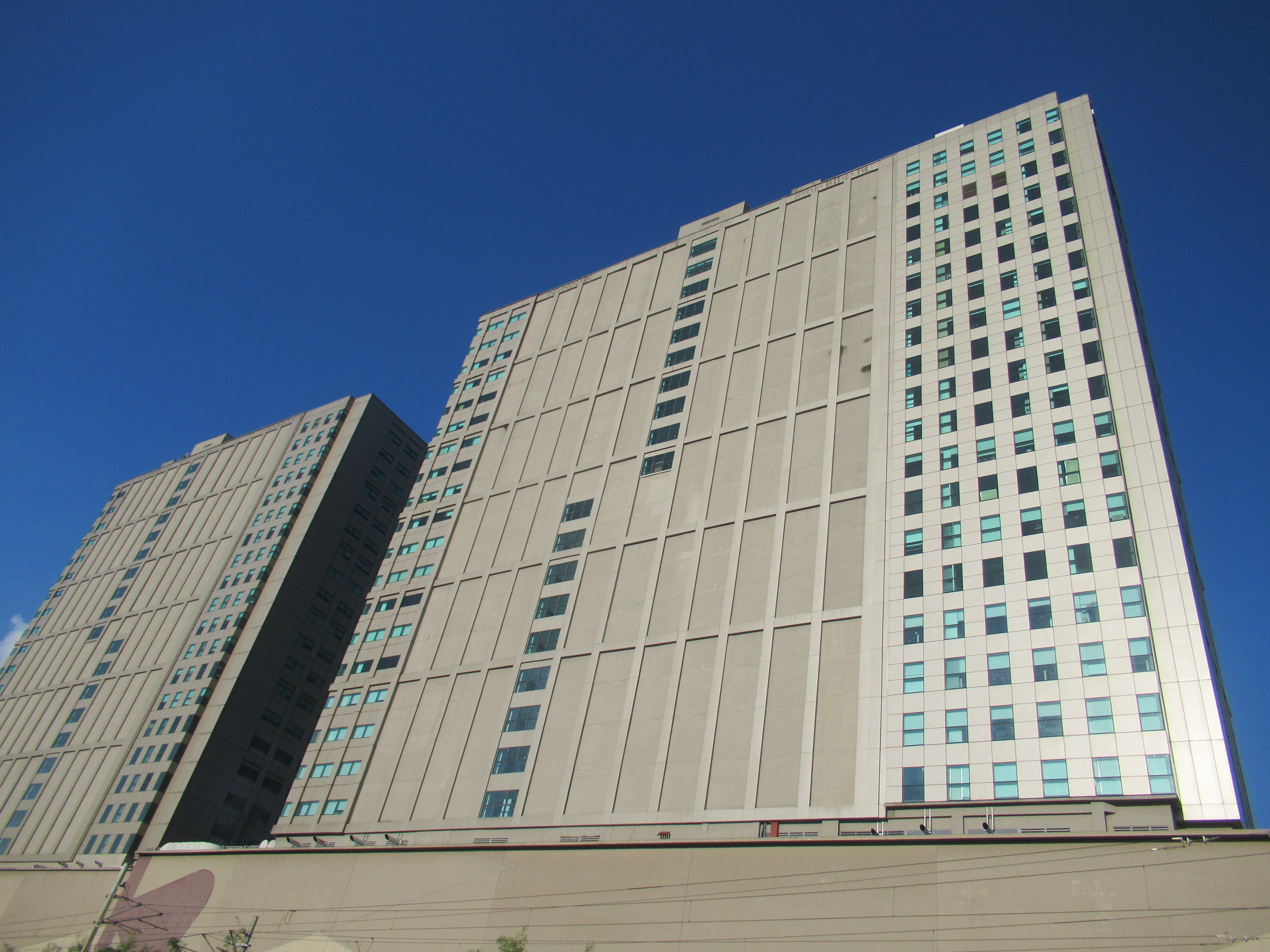
Vertis North Corporate Center

Above the Vertis North mall is the three-tower Vertis North Corporate Center, where several BPO companies operate. The three towers have a total of 123,000 m^{2} (1,323,960.98 sq ft) of gross floor area, where each tower have a total of 41,000 m^{2} (441,320.33 sq ft) of gross floor area. The Vertis North Corporate Center Tower 1 is a 19-storey tower and is the first tower to be completed in the complex. Built and completed in 2017, the tower is primarily occupied by Teleperformance, which occupies multiple floors along the tower. Other tenants of the tower include Clock In, Google, Home Credit, Jooksan Inc., Product Key, PSALM Corporation and RAGOA Business Solutions.

The Vertis North Corporate Center Towers 2 and 3 consist of 20 storeys each. They were completed in 2018. Tower 2 is home to companies such as Neksjob and Concentrix, while Tower 3 is occupied by Global Payments and Telus, the tower's main tenant.

An expansion of the Vertis North Corporate Center is currently under construction, with the construction of the Vertis North Corporate Center Towers 4 and 5. The two-tower LEED-certified development are set to have 82,000 m^{2} (882,640.65 sq ft) of gross floor area which also features a contemporary architectural style with green initiatives. The towers are set to be completed within 2027.

=== Solaire Resort North ===
Solaire Resort North

Solaire Resort North is a 1.5-hectare (3.7-acre), 33-storey integrated hotel and resort-casino located between three roads, namely EDSA, Sola Drive, and Solaire Way. Solaire Resort North has a total of 530 rooms and features a wide range of amenities, such as a lobby lounge, a pillarless grand ballroom, four meeting & event halls, ten restaurants, three bars, which includes the Skybar rooftop bar, two gyms, a fitness center, a play area, a L-shaped swimming pool with a water park, and a spa room. The integrated resort opened its doors on May 25, 2024, as the first five-star integrated resort in Quezon City, and was attended by various officials, such as President Bongbong Marcos, First Lady Liza Araneta Marcos, Executive Secretary Lucas Bersamin, Bloomberry Resorts Corp. chairman Enrique K. Razon, and Quezon City Mayor Joy Belmonte.

=== One Vertis Plaza ===
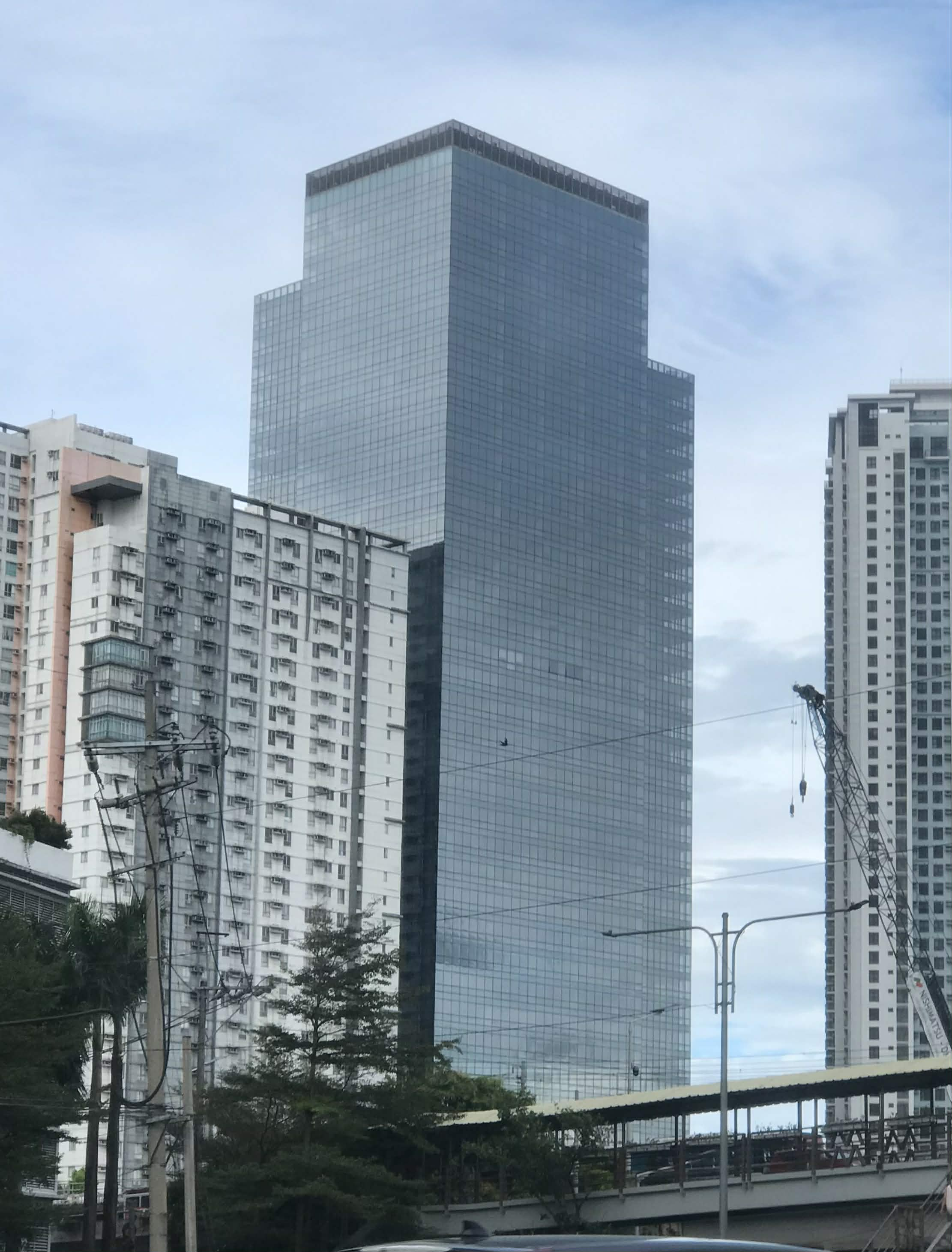
One Vertis Plaza

One Vertis Plaza is a 43-storey office building built on the southern part of Vertis North. The building was developed by Ayala Land Premier as its first premium-grade office building in Quezon City. Construction of the building started in 2019. It was topped off in early 2024, and was subsequently turned over to tenants later that year.

=== Residential properties ===
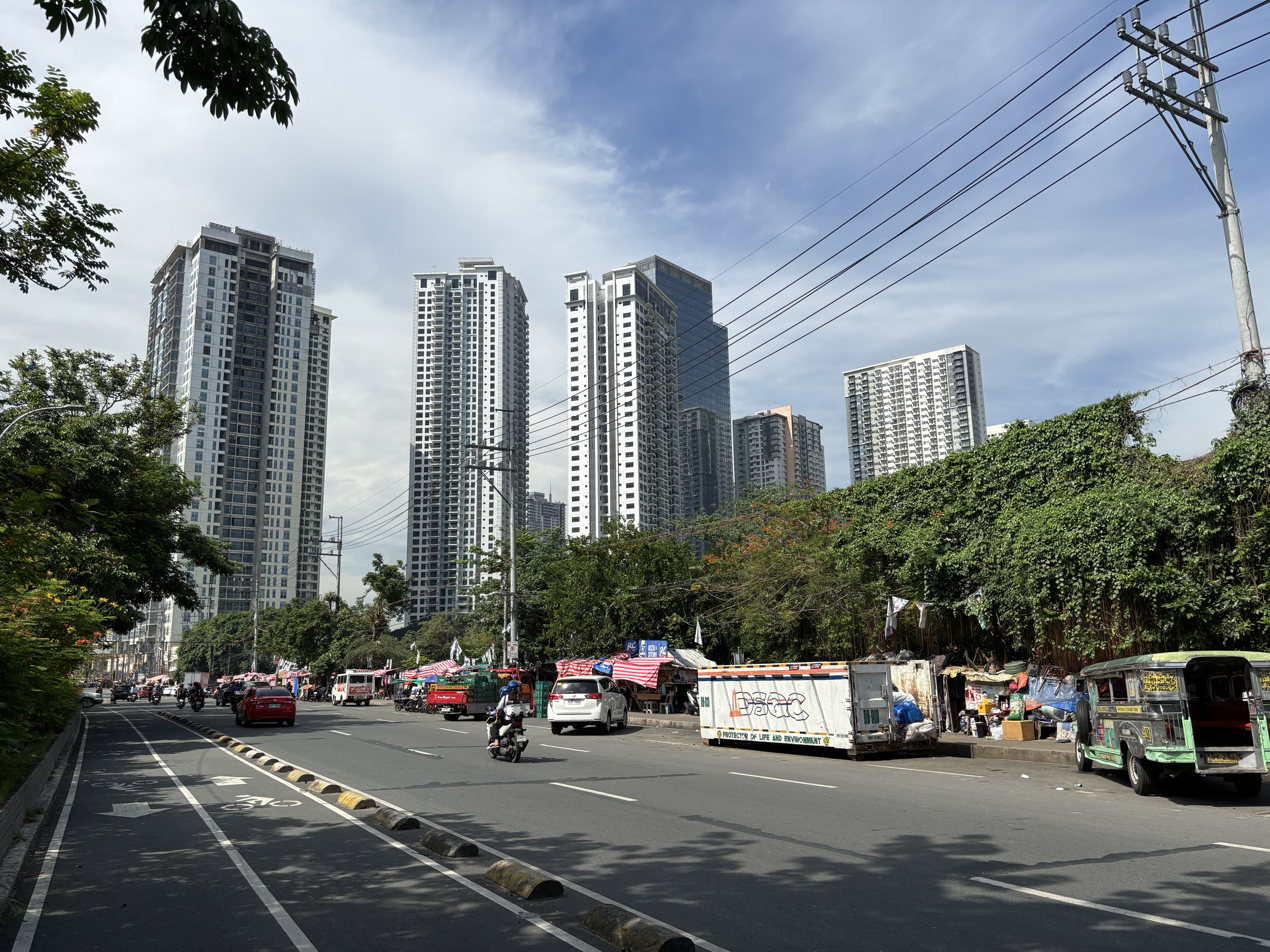
Residential buildings in Vertis North as viewed from Senator Miriam P. Defensor-Santiago Avenue

Residential developments in Vertis North are primarily developed by Ayala Land's subsidiary property companies such as Avida and Alveo, where each company has two condominium developments in the area. Avida's condominium developments are named Avida Vita and Avida Sola, while Alveo's developments in the area are named High Park and Orean Place. The Avida Vita is a three-tower condominium complex located between EDSA, Sola Drive, and Vita Drive, and is the first condominium complex to be completed in the area, as the towers were completed in 2017. Located across Avida Vita is the Avida Sola, a two tower condominium complex and is the second condominium development under the Avida brand. The Avida Sola complex was completed in July 2023.

The High Park consists of two towers and serves as the first Alveo-branded condominium complex to be completed in the area, which was completed in 2022. The second set of towers is the Orean Place, a two-tower complex located in between High Park and Senator Miriam P. Defensor-Santiago Avenue, with plans laid out for a third tower. The complex is set to be completed within 2025.

=== Rain Garden ===
Vertis North Rain Garden is a 2-hectare (4.9-acre) multi-purpose park that serves as a functional rainwater catchment basin.

== Ownership ==
The ownership of the project is split, with 72% for Ayala Land Inc. (ALI) and 28% for the National Housing Authority (NHA). The land in the North Triangle is owned by the NHA, while Vertis North is a public–private partnership (PPP).

== See also ==
- Eton Centris
- Araneta City
