= Ayala Malls =

Chain of Philippine shopping malls

- Type: Subsidiary
- Industry: Retail
- Founded: 1988; 38 years ago
- Headquarters: One Ayala, 1 Ayala Avenue, Makati, Philippines
- Area served: Philippines
- Owner: Ayala Land
- Website: www.ayalamalls.com

Ayala Malls is a retail subsidiary of real estate company Ayala Land, the real estate unit of Ayala Corporation. Founded in 1988, Ayala Malls owns a chain of large shopping malls, all located in the Philippines. It is one of the largest shopping mall retailers in the Philippines, alongside SM Supermalls and Robinsons Malls.

== Assets ==
=== Luzon ===
==== Metro Manila ====
Ayala Malls in Metro Manila

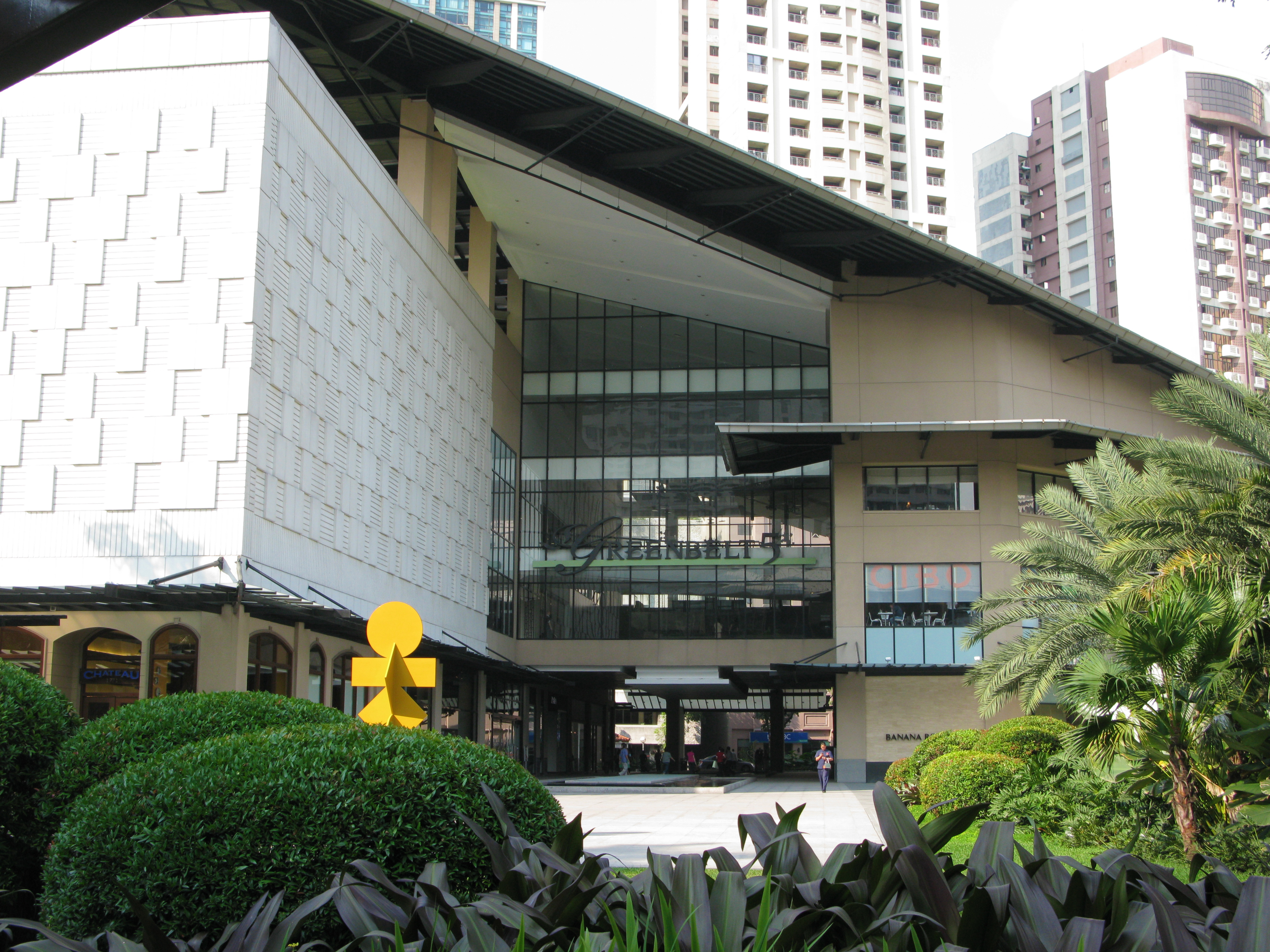
Greenbelt

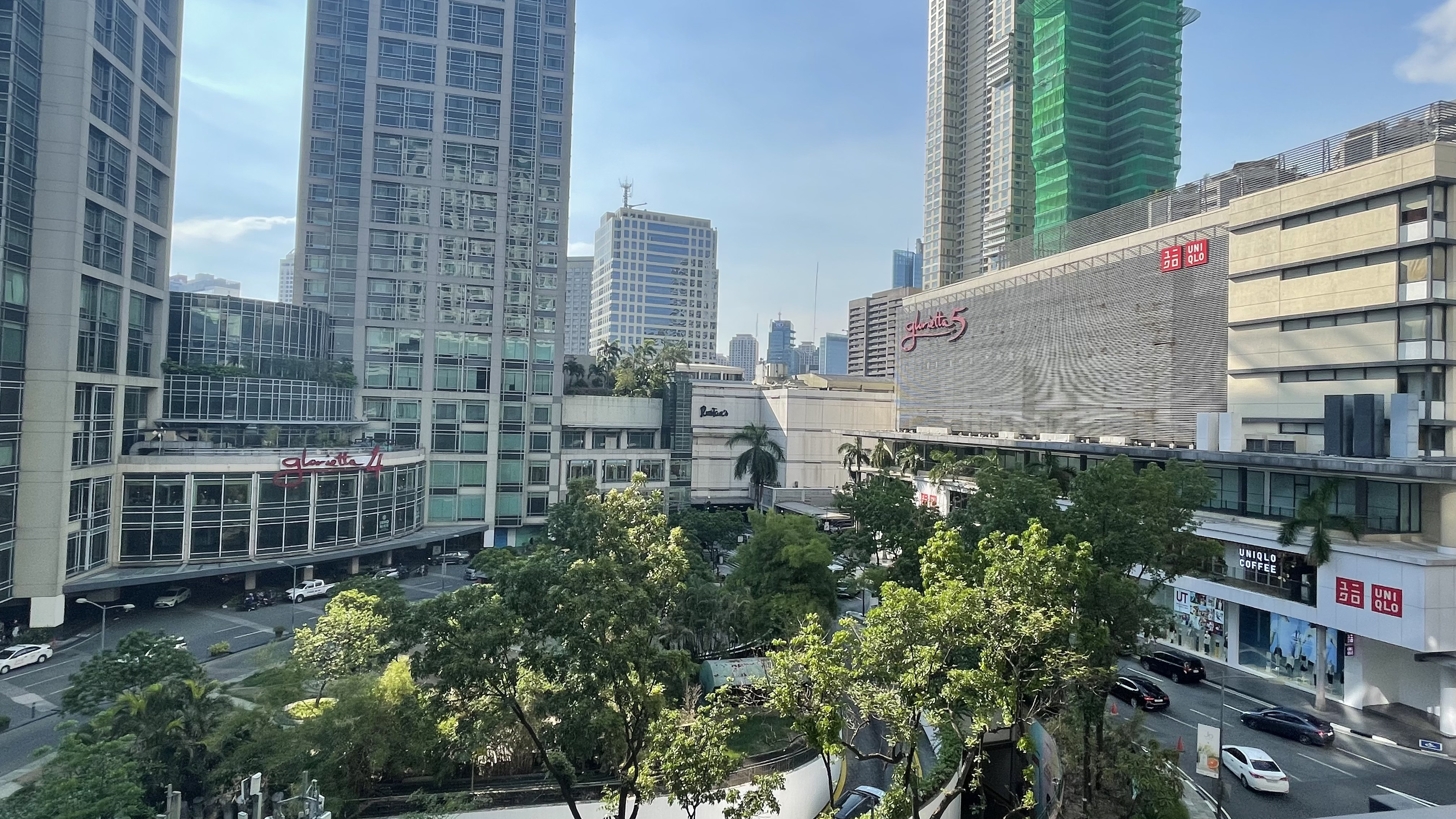
Glorietta

Market! Market!

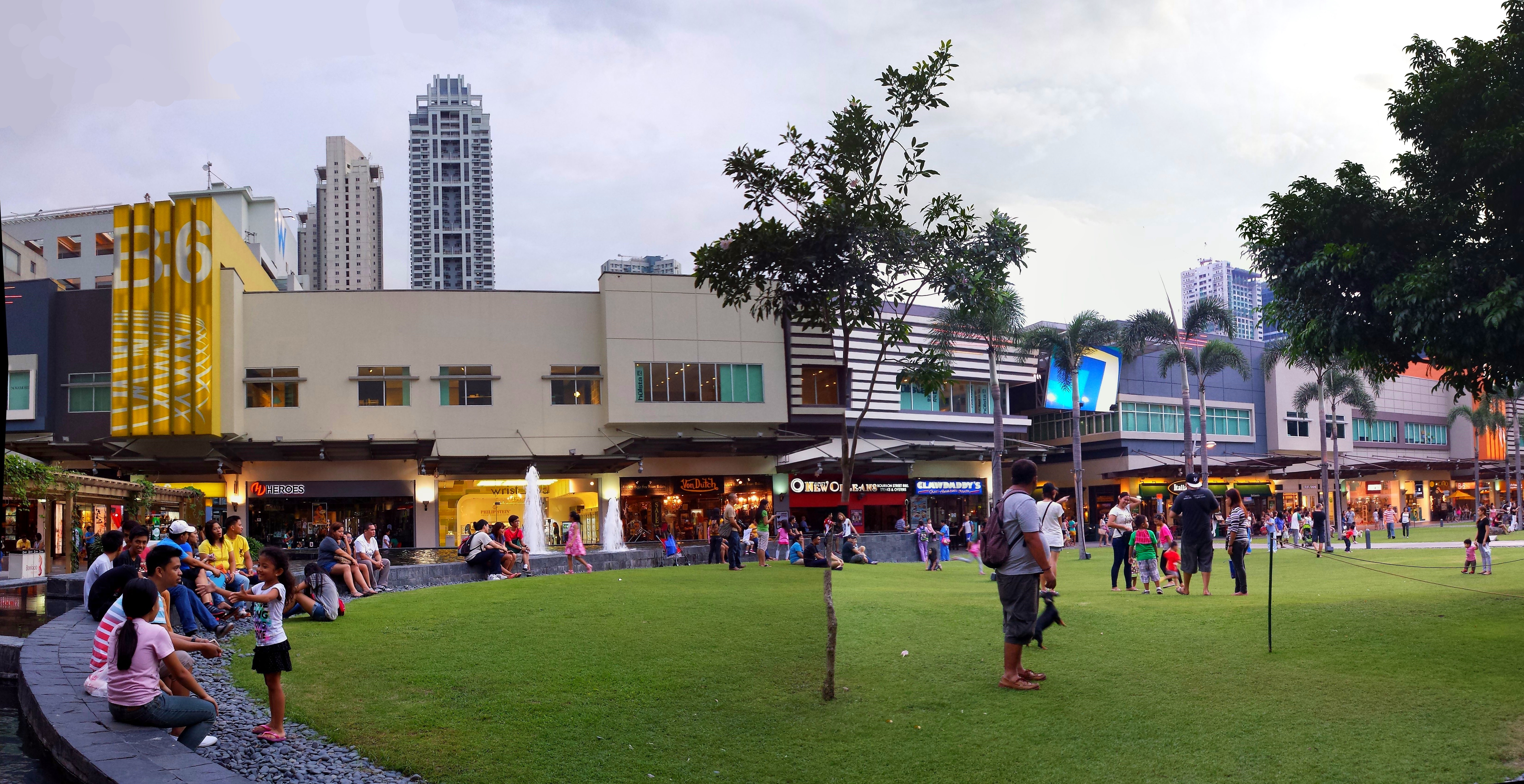
Bonifacio High Street

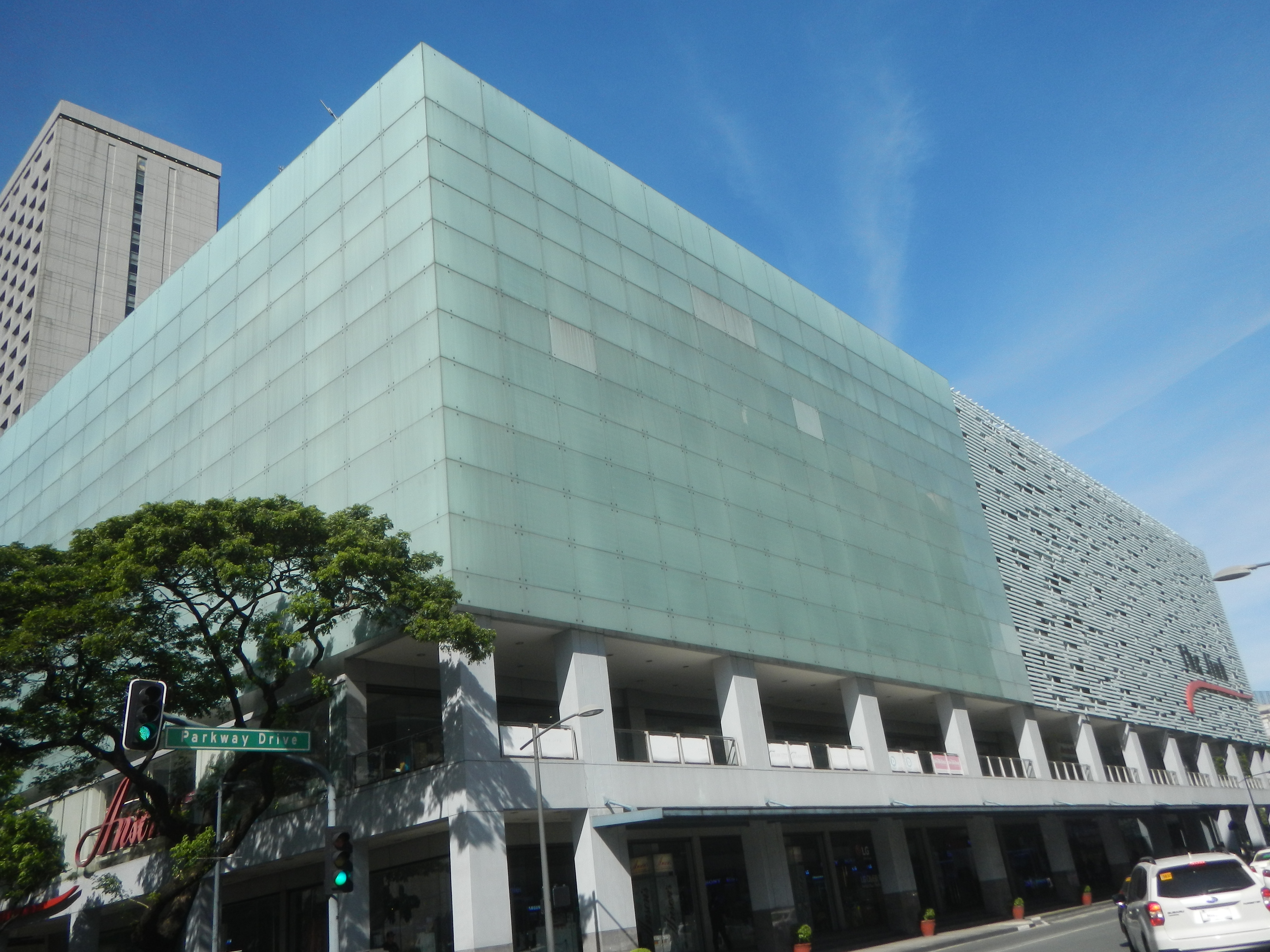
The Link Car Park

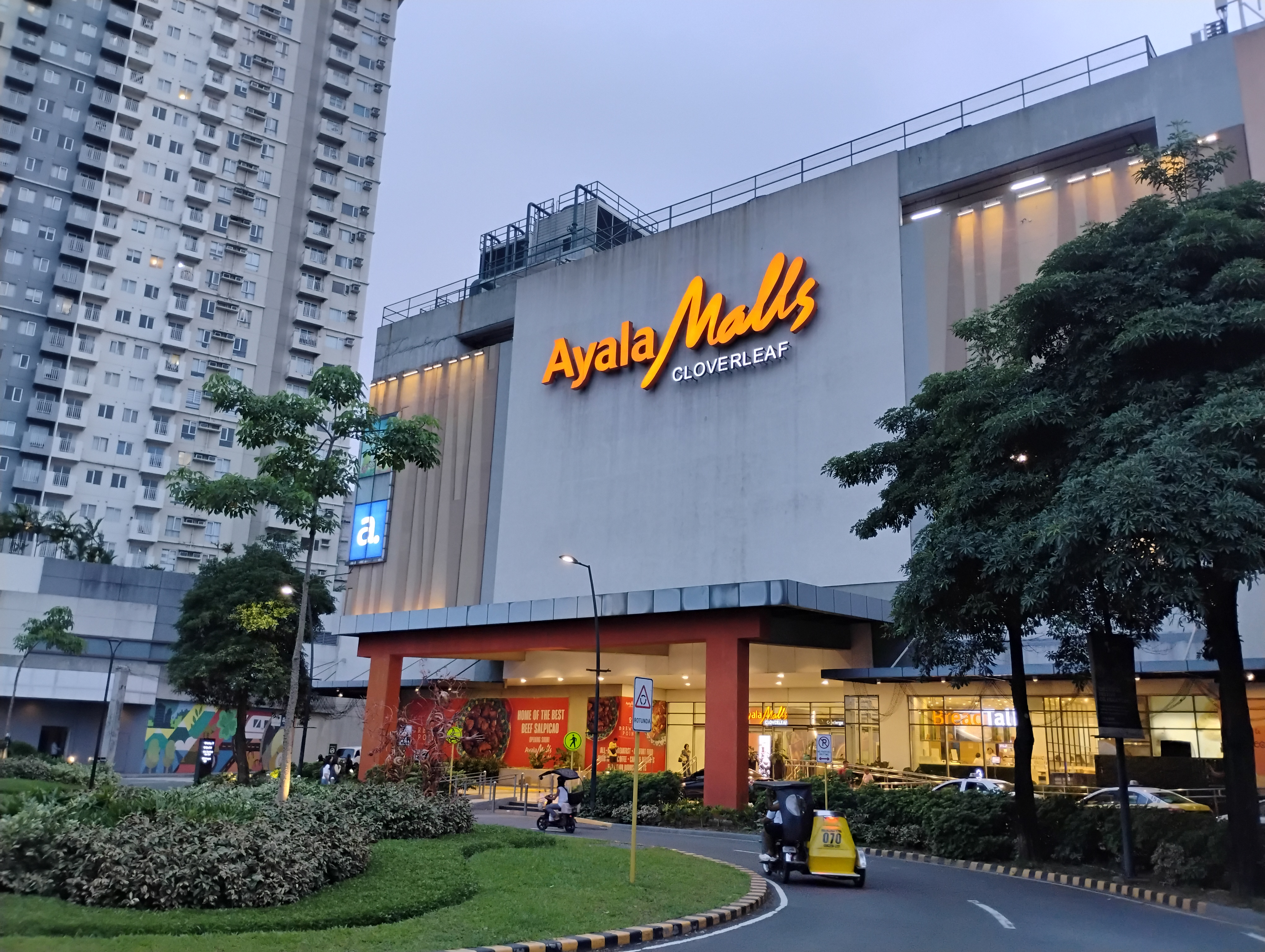
Ayala Malls Cloverleaf

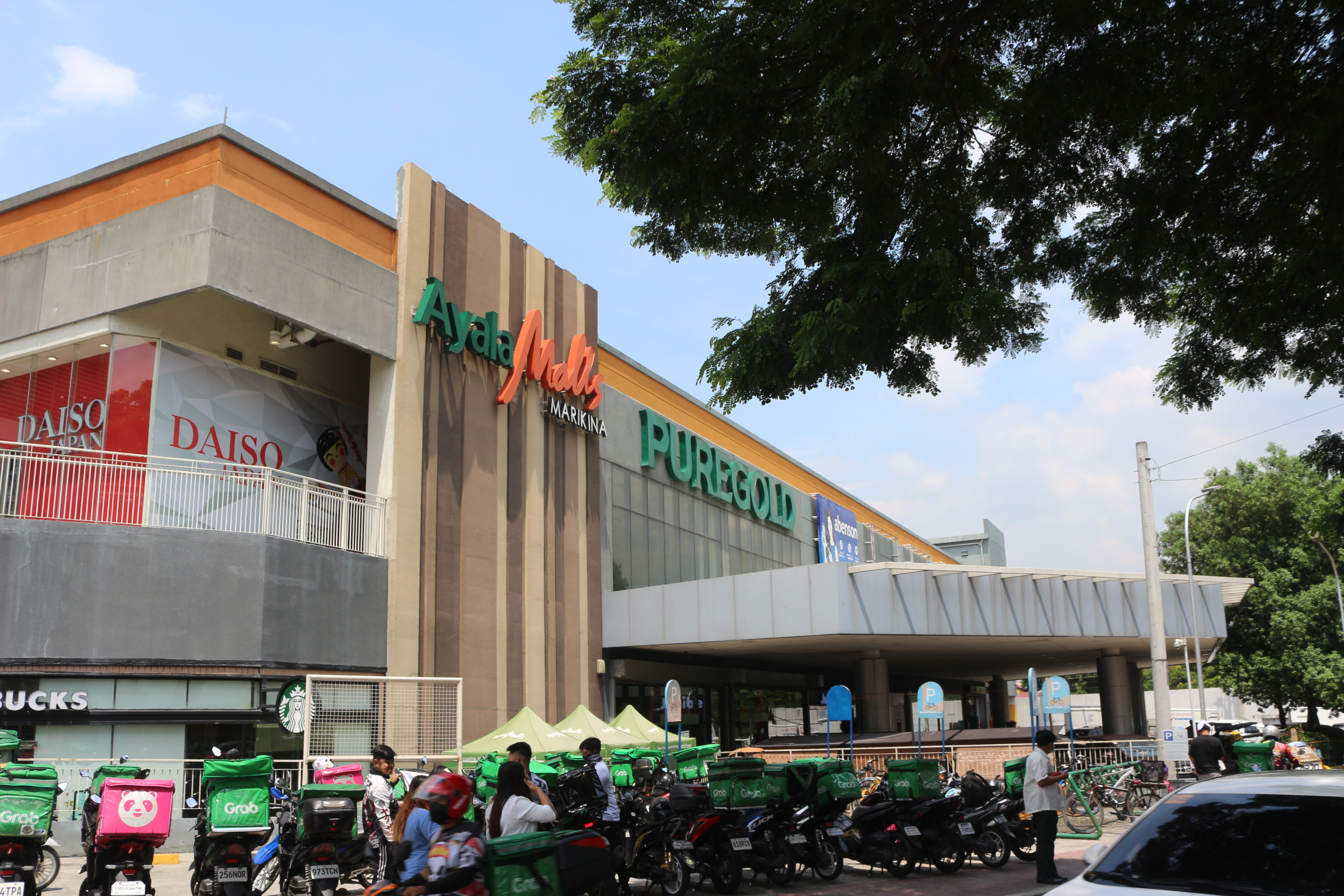
Ayala Malls Marikina

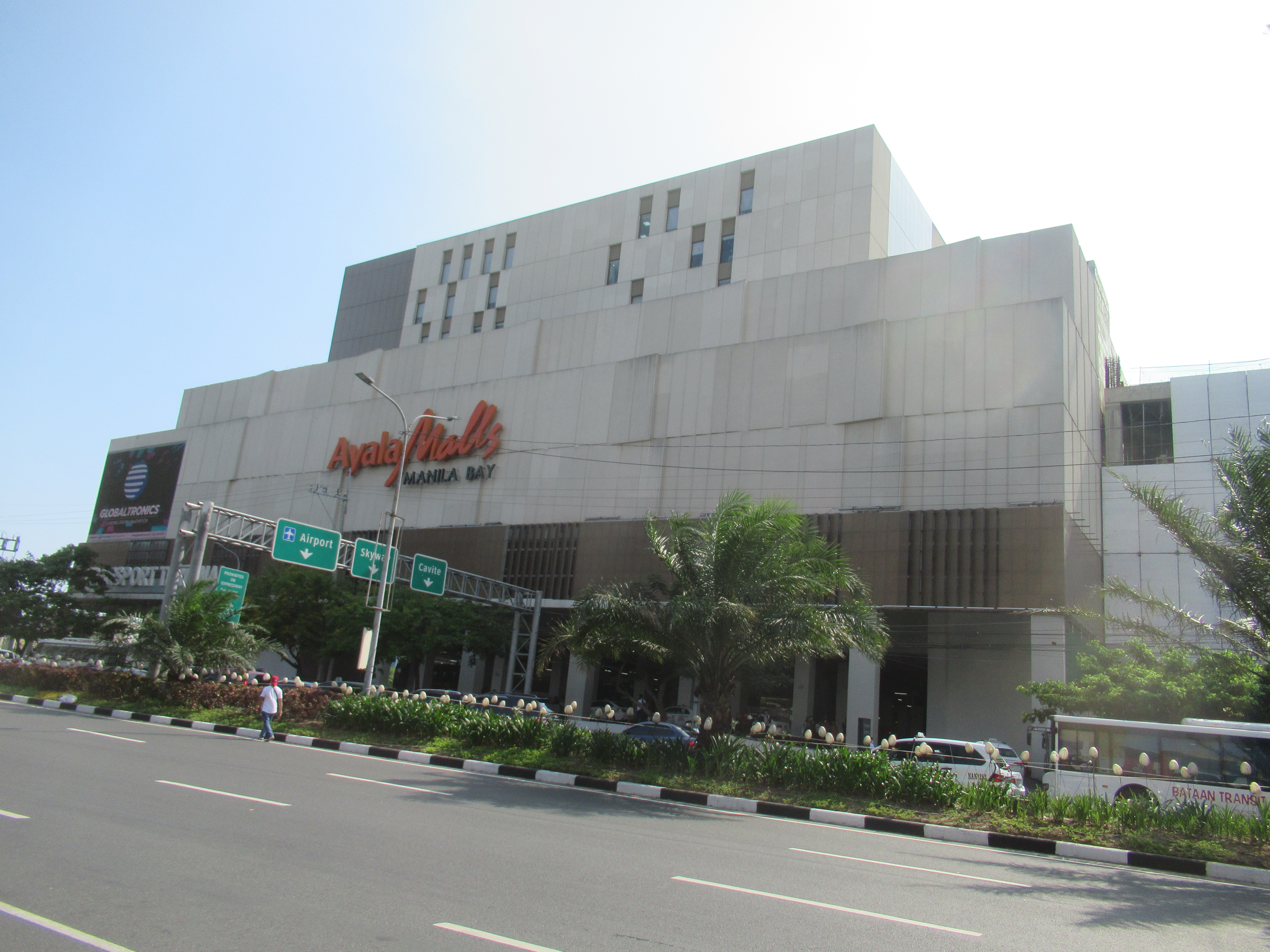
Ayala Malls Manila Bay

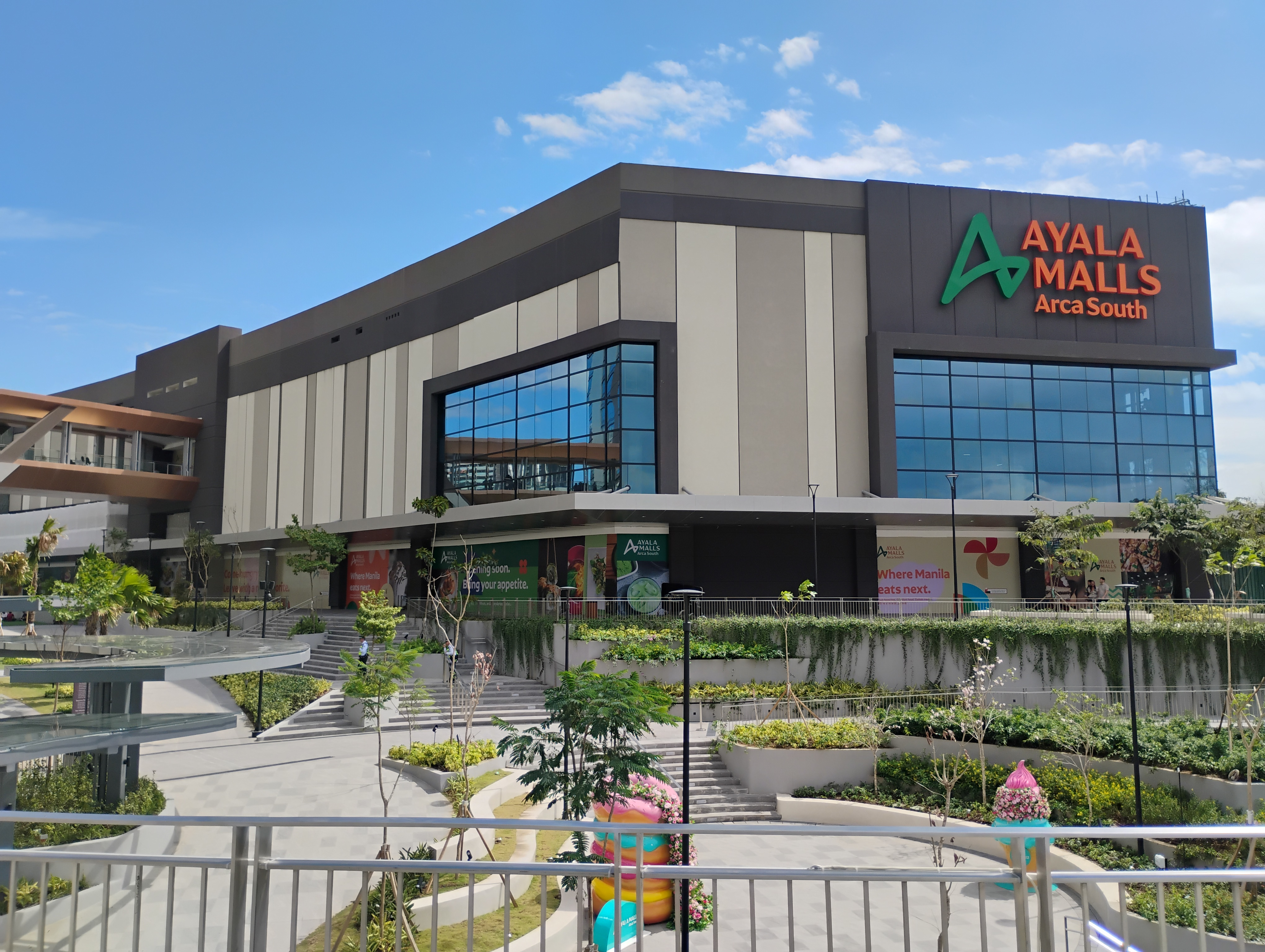
Ayala Malls Arca South

List of 23 assets in Metro Manila by Ayala Malls, showing the opening date and location
Title	Opening date	Location
Greenbelt	1988	Ayala Center, Makati
Glorietta	1991	Ayala Center, Makati
Metro Point Mall	December 1, 2001	EDSA, Pasay
Shops at Serendra	May 2004	Bonifacio Global City, Taguig
Market! Market!	September 16, 2004	Bonifacio Global City, Taguig
Trinoma	May 16, 2007	North Avenue, Quezon City
Bonifacio High Street	October 2007	Bonifacio Global City, Taguig
The Link Car Park	2010	Ayala Center, Makati
U.P. Town Center	September 30, 2013	U.P. Campus, Quezon City
Fairview Terraces	February 28, 2014	Quirino Highway, Quezon City
Ayala Malls The 30th	January 12, 2017	Ortigas Center, Pasig
Ayala Malls Vertis North	June 9, 2017	Vertis North, Quezon City
Ayala Malls Cloverleaf	October 25, 2017	Balintawak Interchange, Quezon City
Ayala Malls Marikina	November 28, 2017	Marikina Heights, Marikina
Ayala Malls Feliz	December 21, 2017	Marikina–Infanta Highway, Pasig
Ayala Malls Circuit	July 27, 2018	Circuit Makati
One Bonifacio High Street	August 2018	Bonifacio Global City, Taguig
Ayala Malls Manila Bay	September 26, 2019	Aseana City, Parañaque
Shops at Ayala North Exchange	December 2019	Ayala Avenue, Makati
The Shops Ayala Triangle Gardens	2022	Ayala Triangle Gardens, Makati
One Ayala	July 18, 2022	Ayala Center, Makati
Ayala Malls Arca South	February 13, 2026	Arca South, Taguig
Ayala Malls Parklinks	—N/a	Parklinks, Quezon City

==== Non-Metro Manila ====
Ayala Malls in Luzon excluding Metro Manila

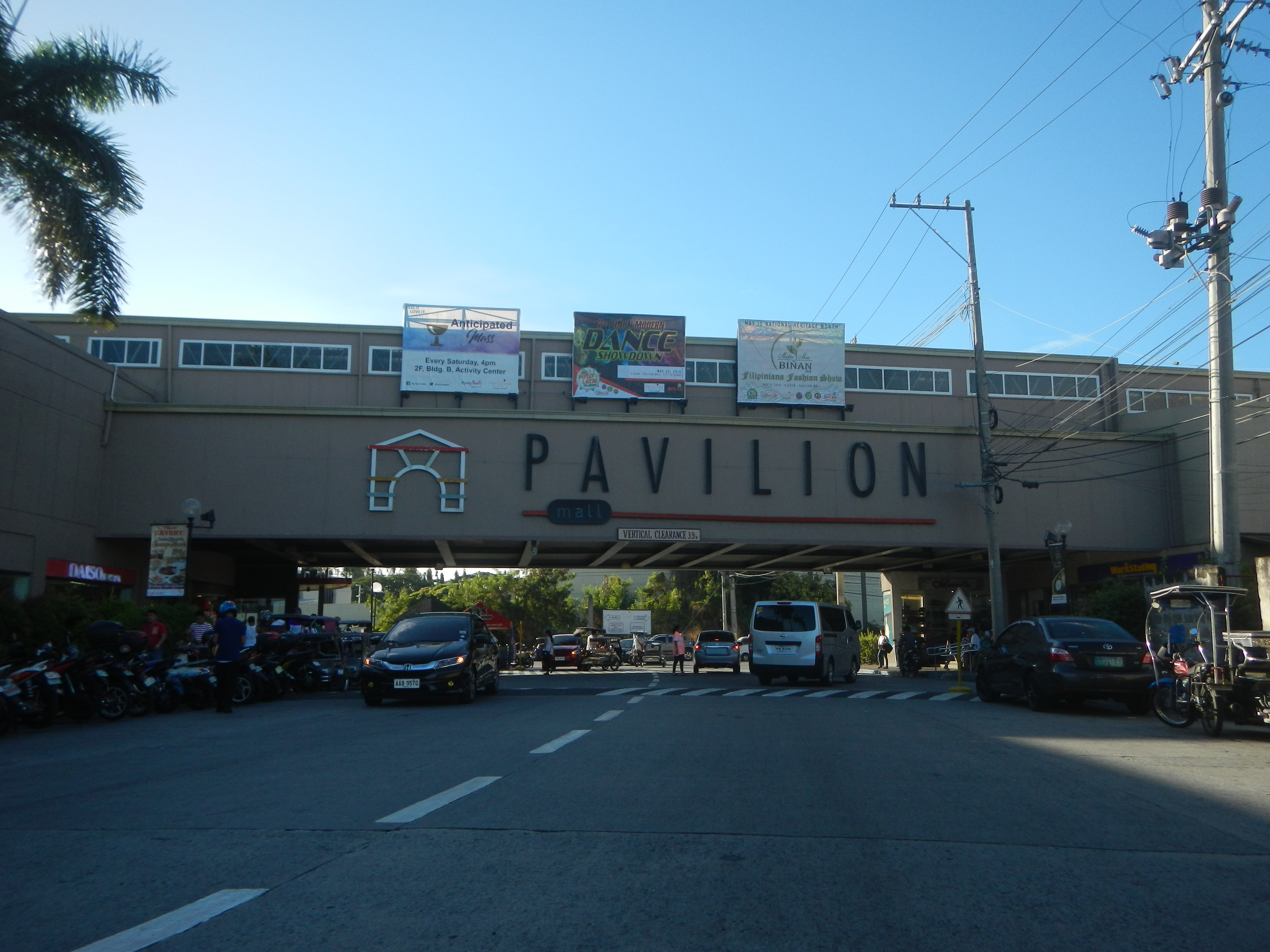
Pavilion Mall

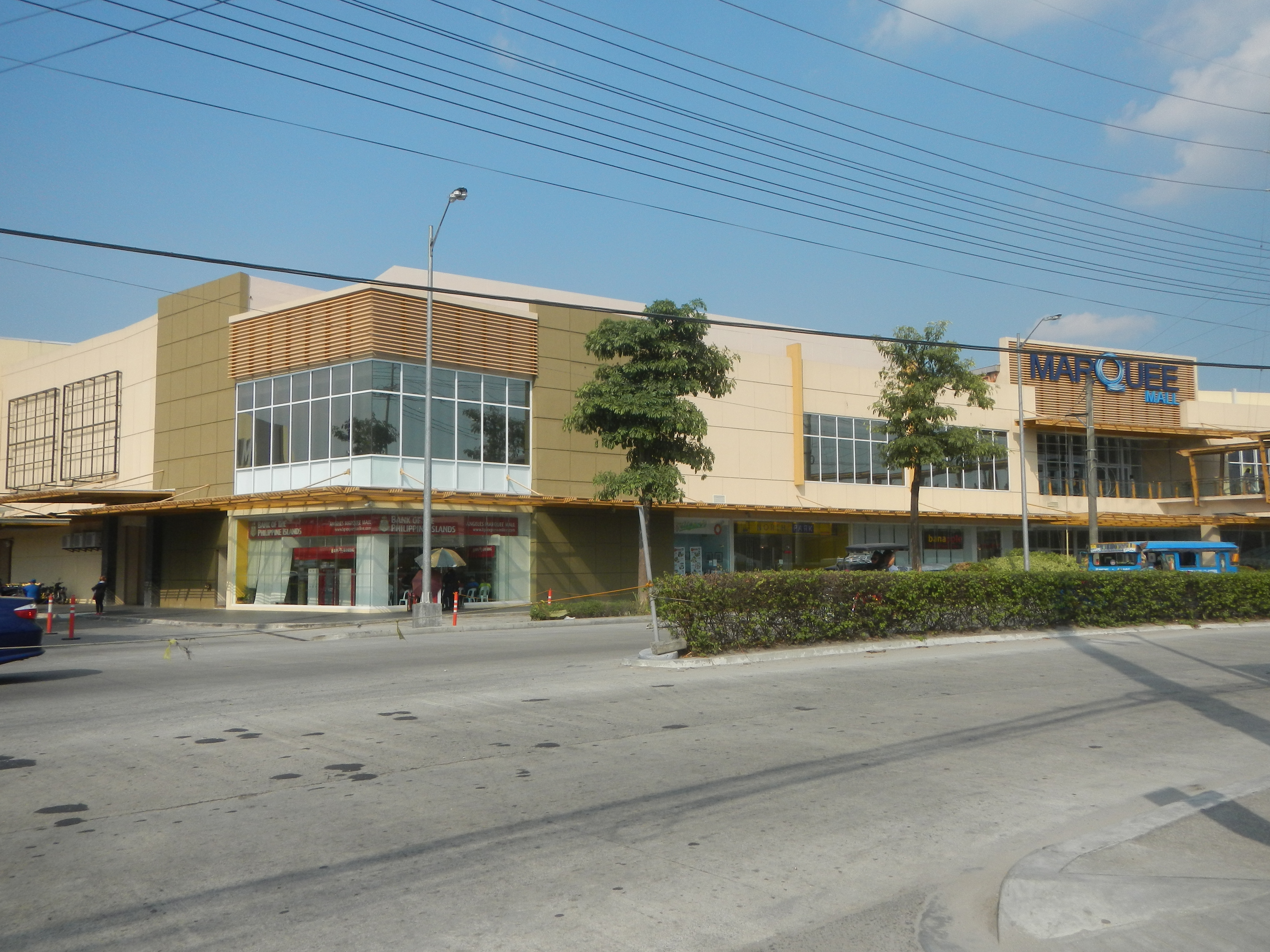
MarQuee Mall

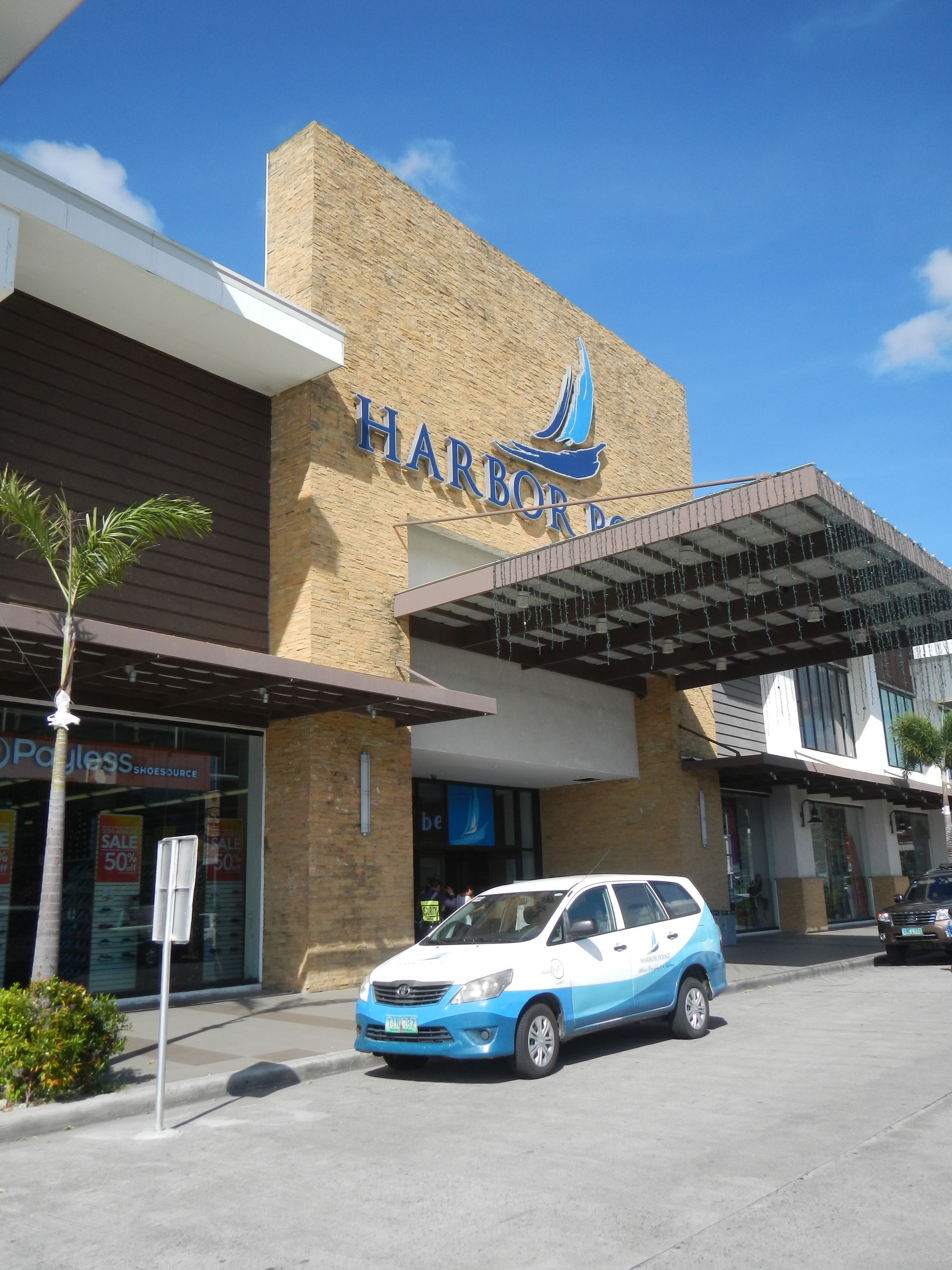
Harbor Point

List of 10 assets in Luzon excluding Metro Manila by Ayala Malls, showing the opening date and location
Title	Opening date	Location
Pavilion Mall	October 1999	Biñan, Laguna
MarQuee Mall	September 23, 2009	Angeles City, Pampanga
Harbor Point	April 26, 2012	Subic Special Economic and Freeport Zone, Olongapo, Zambales
The District Imus	December 14, 2012	Imus, Cavite
The District Dasmariñas	November 22, 2013	Dasmariñas, Cavite
Ayala Malls Serin	March 27, 2015	Tagaytay, Cavite
Ayala Malls Nuvali (Note: Also known as Ayala Malls Solenad.)	August 6, 2015 (Note: 2009, launched under Ayala Malls in 2015.)	Nuvali, Santa Rosa, Laguna
Ayala Malls Legazpi	April 19, 2016	Legazpi, Albay
Ayala Malls Vermosa	November 17, 2023	Imus, Cavite
Ayala Malls Evo City	September 5, 2025	Evo City, Kawit, Cavite

=== Visayas ===
Ayala Malls in Visayas

Ayala Center Cebu

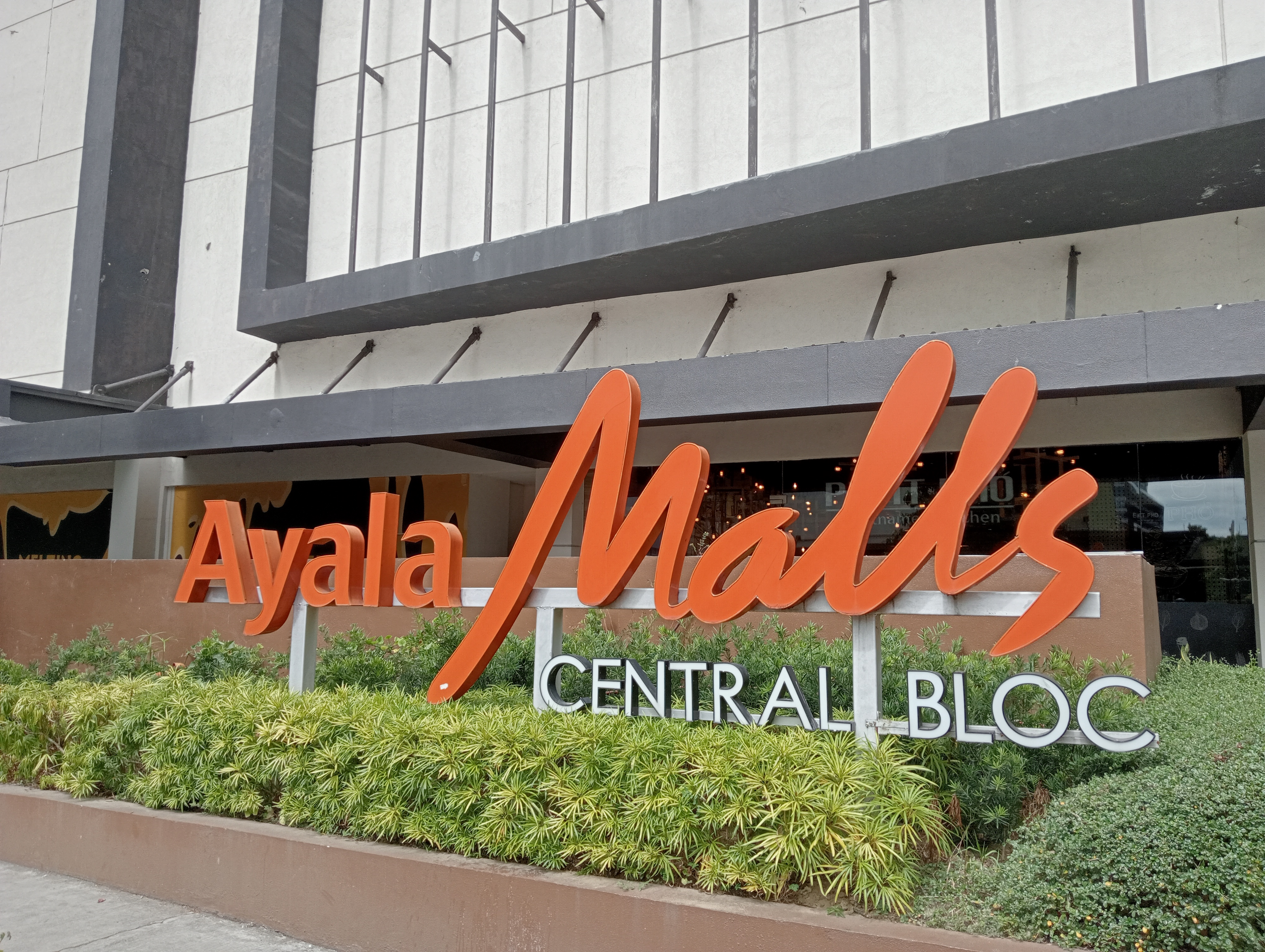
Ayala Malls Central Bloc

Ayala Malls Capitol Central

List of nine assets in Visayas by Ayala Malls, showing the opening date and location
Title	Opening date	Location
Ayala Center Cebu	November 1994	Cebu Business Park, Luz, Cebu City, Metro Cebu
The Walk at Cebu IT Park	2008	Cebu IT Park, Cebu City, Metro Cebu
The District North Point	April 3, 2013	Talisay, Negros Occidental
The Shops at Atria	2015	Atria Park District, Mandurriao, Iloilo City
Garden Bloc at Cebu IT Park	2015	Cebu IT Park, Cebu City, Metro Cebu
Ayala Malls Capitol Central	December 14, 2018	Capitol Central, Bacolod, Negros Occidental
Ayala Malls Central Bloc	December 6, 2019	Cebu IT Park, Apas, Cebu City, Metro Cebu
Seagrove	January 2024	Punta Engaño, Lapu-Lapu City, Metro Cebu
Ayala Malls Gatewalk	December 16, 2026	Mandaue, Metro Cebu

=== Mindanao ===
List of four assets in Mindanao by Ayala Malls, showing the opening date and location
Title	Opening date	Location
Abreeza	May 12, 2011	Bajada, Davao City, Metro Davao
Centrio Mall	November 9, 2012	Cagayan de Oro, Misamis Oriental
The Shops at Azuela Cove	2021	Davao City, Metro Davao
Azuela High Street	October 2024	Azuela Cove, Davao City, Metro Davao

== Former assets ==
Former assets of Ayala Malls

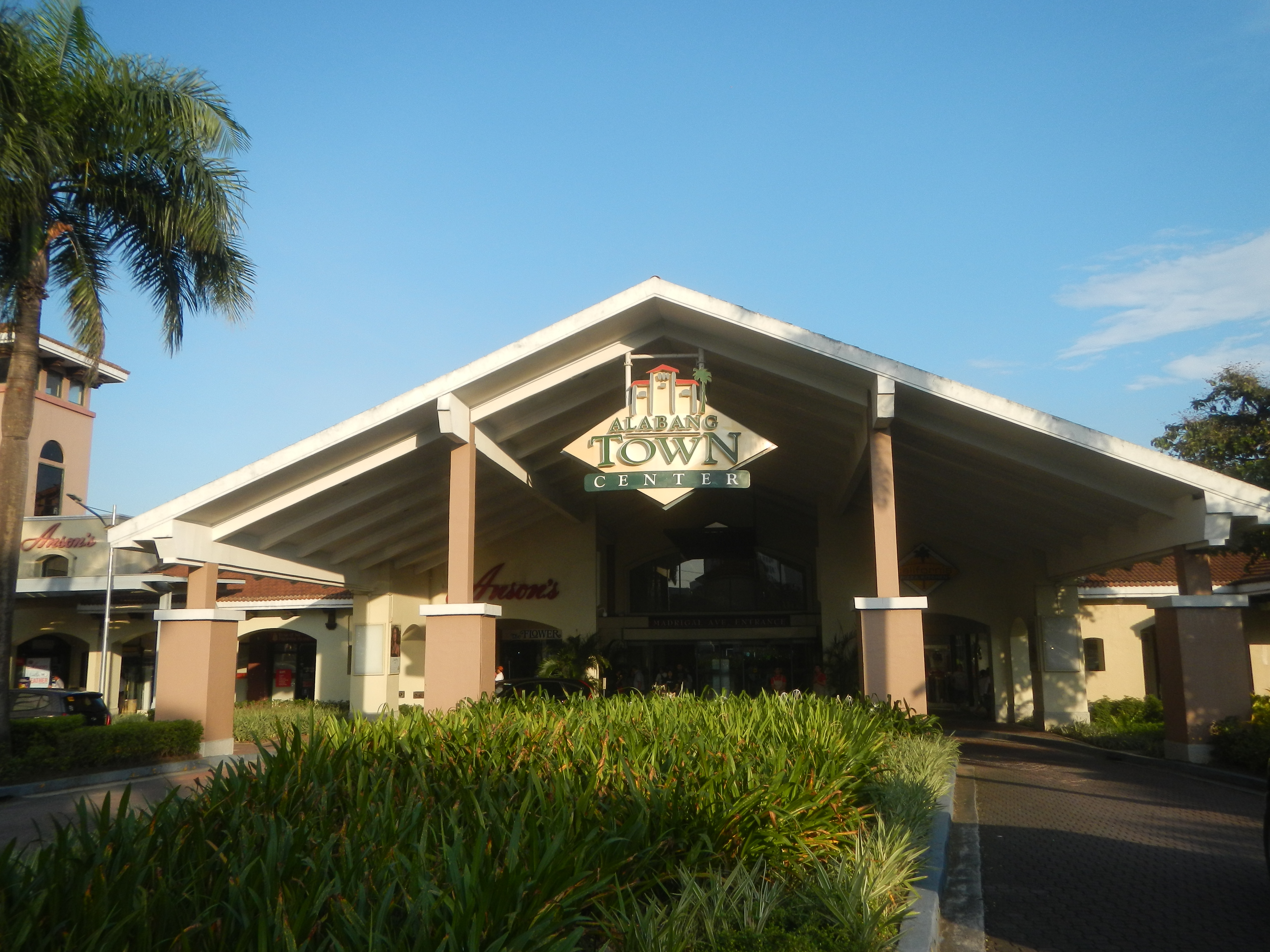
Alabang Town Center

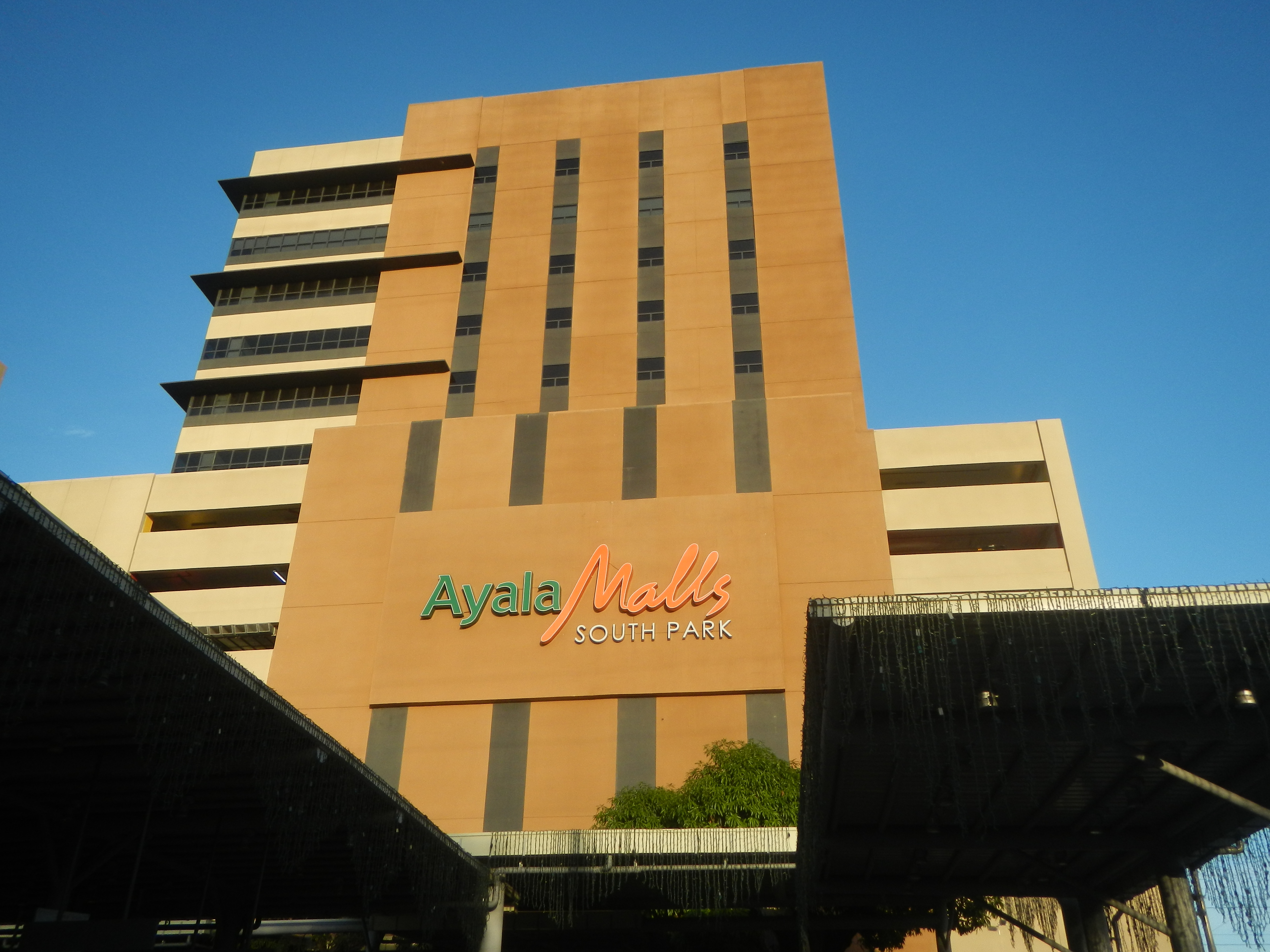
South Park Center

List of assets formerly owned by Ayala Malls, showing the opening date and location
Title	Opening date	Location	Notes
Alabang Town Center	1982	Ayala Alabang, Muntinlupa	Ayala Land sold its stake in 2025 to the Madrigal Group.
South Park Center	November 29, 2016	Alabang, Muntinlupa	Currently managed by Ayala Land Logistics Holdings Corp.

== Amenities ==

- Ayala Malls Cinemas – features film screenings, film festivals, film events and interactive installations.
  - 4DX – features motion seats and environmental effects. Located at One Bonifacio High Street, Greenbelt and U.P. Town Center.
  - A-Giant – features a screen four times larger than the standard cinema screen, recliner seats and Dolby Atmos surround sound. Located at Ayala Malls Manila Bay, Ayala Malls Vertis North and Trinoma.
  - A-Luxe – a "premium" version of Ayala Mall Cinemas, featuring recliner seats, personal tablet, USB porting charger and wider space. Located at Ayala Malls Cloverleaf, Ayala Malls Solenad, Ayala Malls The 30th, Ayala Malls Vermosa and Glorietta.
  - The Movie Snackbar – popcorn and food seller within Ayala Malls Cinemas.
  - MyCinema – offers private screenings. Located at Ayala Malls Manila Bay and Greenbelt.
- Food Choices – houses restaurants and food vendors. It first opened in Glorietta 4.
- Japan Town – a collection of Japanese restaurants. Located at Ayala Malls Manila Bay, Ayala Malls Vertis North and Glorietta.
- Service Avenue - a section of the mall featuring different kind of shops. Located at Ayala Malls Central Bloc, Ayala Malls The 30th and One Ayala.
- Wellness Place – specializes in hair salons, nail salons, waxing salons and skincare procedures.
