= Ayala Malls The 30th =

Shopping mall in Pasig, Philippines

- Meralco Avenue entrance of the mall
- Coordinates: 14°34′51″N 121°03′54″E
- Address: 30 Meralco Avenue, Ortigas Center, Barangay Ugong, Pasig, Metro Manila, Philippines
- Opened: January 12, 2017; 9 years ago
- Developer: Ayala Malls
- Manager: Ayala Malls
- Num. of stores: 184
- Floor area: 27,000 m^{2} (290,000 sq ft)
- Floors: Mall: 4 (including LG level) + 3 for basement carpark Office: 20
- Website: Main website

Ayala Malls The 30th (formerly The District Pasig & Paradigm as working names) is a shopping mall built and managed by Ayala Malls. It is the first Ayala Mall in Ortigas Center as well as in Pasig and the first Ayala Mall to be managed by Mariana Zobel De Ayala. The mall opened on January 12, 2017.

The mall was named "The 30th" as it is located at 30 Meralco Avenue.

== Features ==
Ayala Malls The 30th

The four-level mall sits in a 2 ha (4.9 acres) property located across The Alexandra and between The Renaissance residential condominiums and the Mimaropa regional office of the Department of Education.

It features four levels with approximately 184 shops, restaurants and services (under Service Avenue). Rustan's Supermarket serves as its anchor supermarket. A two-level open space / garden called Corte, located outside the mall, became a haven for events. The mall has three levels of basement parking.

The mall features entertainment options including Timezone branch and Mystery Manila escape room. It featured four cinemas, including two equipped with reclining seats, before they were permanently closed in 2025.
