= Triangle Park (Quezon City) =

Central business district in Quezon City, Metro Manila, Philippines

- Central business district
- Triangle Park around EDSA and North Avenue

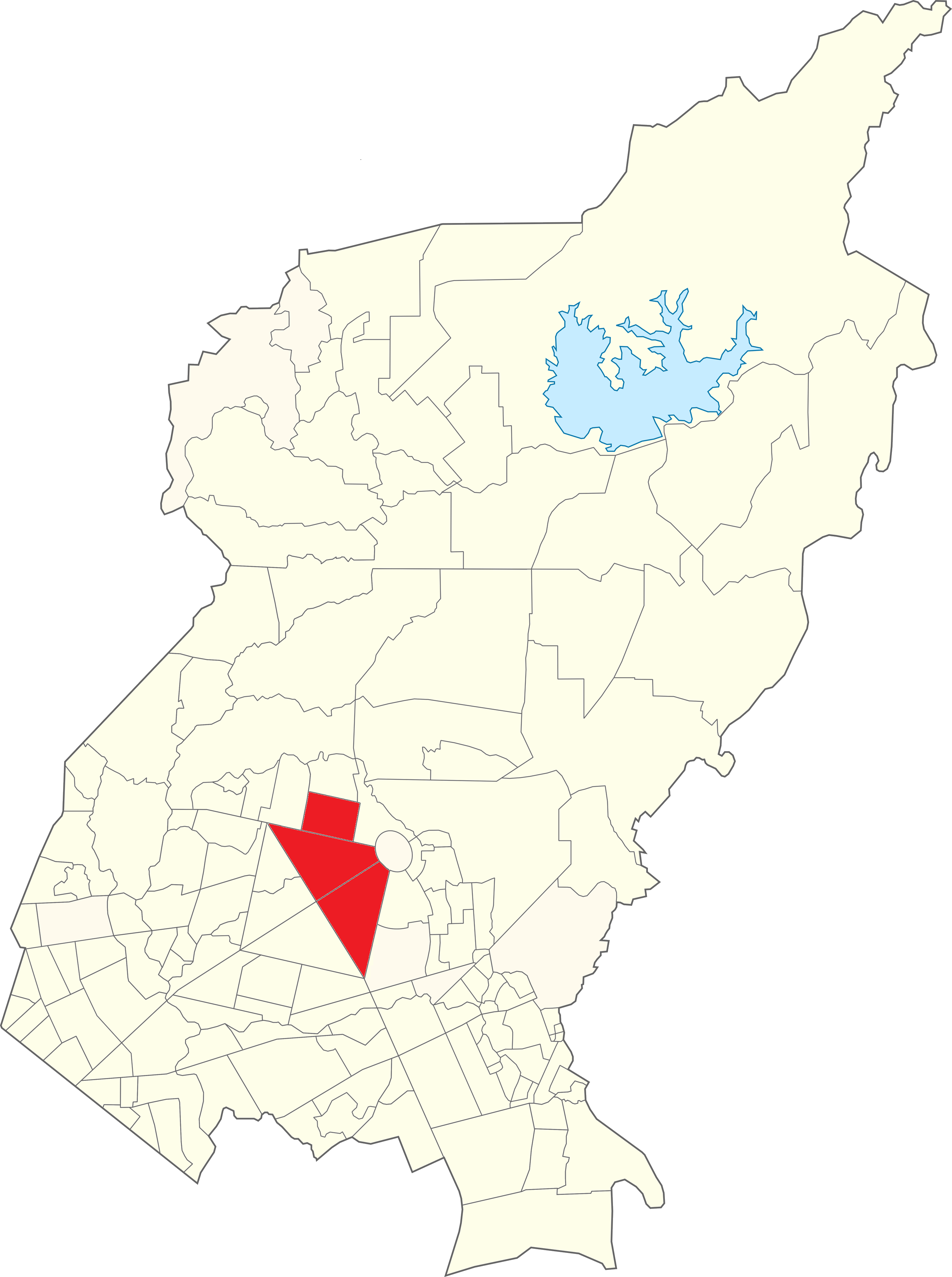
- Map of Quezon City showing Triangle Park

- Location of Quezon City Central Business District within Metro Manila
- Coordinates: 14°39′26″N 121°1′30″E
- Country: Philippines
- Region: National Capital Region
- City: Quezon City
- Barangays: Bagong Pag-asa; Pinyahan; Project 6
- Time zone: UTC+8 (PST)

Triangle Park, also known as the Quezon City Central Business District, is a 250 ha (620 acres) central business district in Quezon City, Philippines. It is organized around five districts namely: Commons, Downtown Hub, Emporium, Residences at Veterans and Triangle Exchange.

It is one of the three existing main business districts of the city - alongside Eastwood City in Bagumbayan and Araneta City in Cubao. It is also one of two business districts currently being developed or redeveloped, the other being Neopolitan Business Park in Novaliches.

This business district spans from the East and North Triangles to the Quezon Memorial Circle also encompassing the Veterans Memorial Medical Center (VMMC) property along North Avenue. The World Bank dubbed the project as “the center of gravity of commercial developments in Metro Manila in the coming years.” It is linked to the EDSA frontages and served by the LRT Line 1, and MRT Line 3 rail systems. The World Bank contracted the Japanese firm, Almec, to complete the framework plan. Two companies have been given permission to develop the remaining empty lots, Ayala Land in cooperation with the National Housing Authority for the North Triangle and Eton Properties Philippines of the Lucio Tan Group for the East Triangle.

== History ==
The project began as early as May 2002 with the issuance of Executive Order No. 106 by then president Gloria Macapagal Arroyo creating the tripartite body called the North Triangle Development Committee that will oversee the development of the Quezon City Central Business District after a visit in the area. The committee is tasked specifically to study and resolve the problem of security of tenure of the residents in North Triangle – a 37-hectare (91-acre) property of the National Housing Authority (NHA) that is leased to the Robinsons Land Corporation.

By 2007, the covered area expanded to 250 hectares (620 acres) while the name and composition of the body tasked to define and implement the plan was changed by Executive Orders No. 620 and 620-A issued May 4 and September 11, respectively. These Executive Orders mandate the “rationalization and speeding up of the development of the East and North Triangles, and the Veterans Memorial Medical Center area of Quezon City, as a well-planned, integrated and environmentally balanced mixed-use development model.” It also transformed the North Triangle Development Committee into the Urban Triangle Development Commission (TriDev Commission) and shrank the composition of said body from five to three members.

In September 2010, the NHA began ordering the relocation of informal settlers in the area, particularly in the sitio of San Roque II. However, many residents of San Roque II refused to relocate to the designated housing sites in Rodriguez, Rizal due to claims of poor living conditions and the lack of amenities and opportunities there. Despite the residents' pleas, the NHA began demolishing the sitio by force, causing a violent seven-hour standoff between NHA workers and the residents. The standoff spilled over onto EDSA and resulted in 14 injuries and over 130 homes demolished before the demolition was ordered halted by president Benigno Aquino III and a temporary restraining order issued by the Supreme Court of the Philippines.

In March 2012, the Quezon City council passed an ordinance classifying 250.6 hectares (619 acres) of the North Triangle, East Triangle and the Veterans Memorial Medical Center (VMMC) as a Central Business District including a master plan for the orderly organization of the area with distinct regulations and standards not provided for in existing laws.

== Economy ==
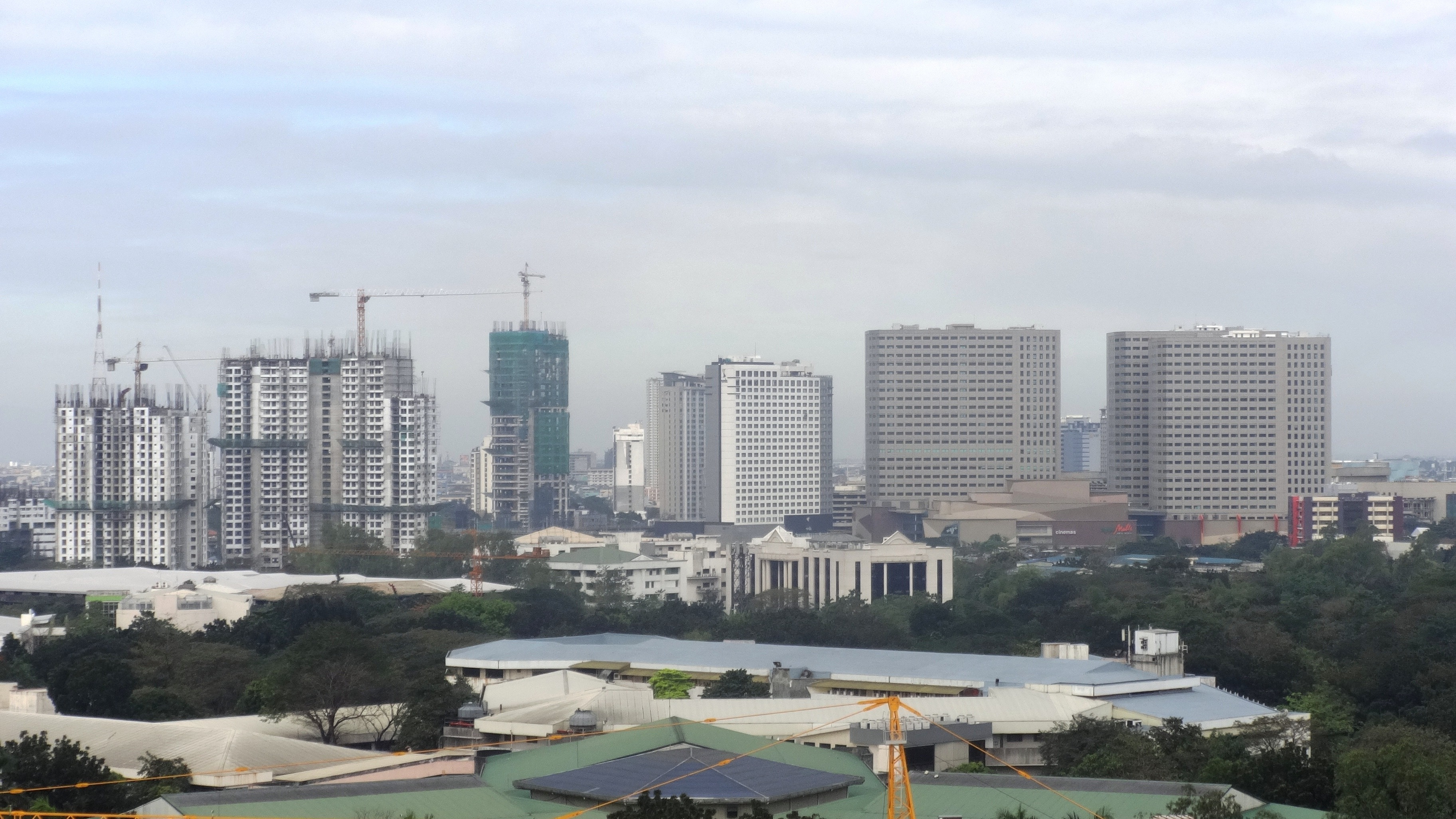
The Quezon City Central Business District.

TriNoma along with the Vertis North development of Ayala Malls is located at the western tip of Triangle Park. Also within the area is the Eton Centris development.

== Healthcare institutions ==
Hospitals found within the Triangle Park are the Lung Center of the Philippines, the National Kidney and Transplant Institute, the Philippine Children's Medical Center, and the Veterans Memorial Hospital. The Occupational Safety and Health Center of the Department of Labor and Employment is also within the area.

== Education ==
The Diliman campus of the Manuel L. Quezon University as well as the main campus of Philippine Science High School is located within Triangle Park. The PAGASA Planetarium is found within the PAGASA Science Garden.

== Parks and recreation space ==
The Ninoy Aquino Parks & Wildlife Center and the PAGASA Garden are found inside the Triangle Park.

== National and local government offices ==
National government agencies holding offices at Triangle Park are: the Bureau of Internal Revenue, the Environmental Management Bureau of the Department of Environment and Natural Resources, the Department of Public Works and Highways which maintains a regional office serving Region IV-A, the Land Registration Authority, National Irrigation Administration, the National Electrification Administration, the National Power Corporation, the National Printing Office, the National Telecommunications Commission, the National Training Center, the National Transmission Corporation, the National Water Resources Board, the Philippine Drug Enforcement Agency including the Dangerous Drugs Board, and the Philippine Statistics Authority. The Office of the Ombudsman and the Quezon City Central Post Office is also based in the area.

The offices of the Public-Private Partnership Center and the Philippine Institute for Development Studies are also based in the Eton Centris which is part of the area.

== See also ==
- Araneta City
- Bonifacio Global City
- Filinvest City
- Makati Central Business District
- Ortigas Center
