= U.P. Town Center =

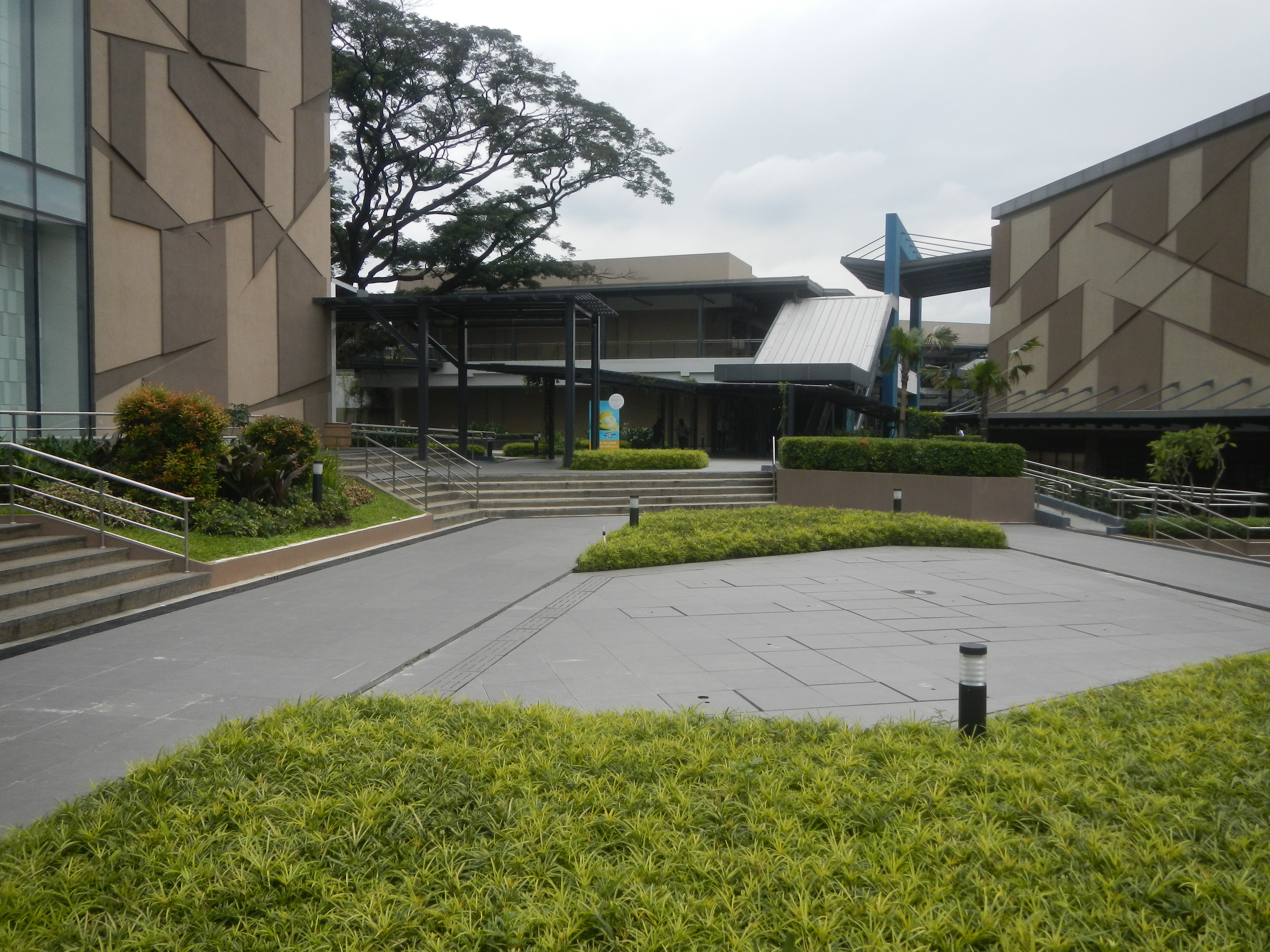
- Location: Quezon City, Philippines
- Coordinates: 14°39′04″N 121°04′30″E
- Address: Katipunan Avenue, Brgy. U.P. Campus, Diliman
- Opened: September 30, 2013; 13 years ago
- Developer: Ayala Land
- Manager: Ayala Malls
- Architect: Benoy
- Floor area: 174,000 square meters (1,870,000 sq ft)
- Floors: Phase 1: 2 Phase 1A: 3 Phase 2: 3
- Public transit: Katipunan; 19 UP Town Center

The Ayala Malls U.P. Town Center is a shopping center in Quezon City, Metro Manila, Philippines, managed by the Ayala Malls group. It was built within the University of the Philippines (UP) Diliman campus.

== History ==
Ayala Land secured a 25-year lease with the University of the Philippines (UP) on January 28, 2011 to develop a 7.4 ha (18 acres) lot alongside Katipunan Avenue to build a shopping mall complex on where the UP Integrated School used to stand. The trees in the lot were not cut down, and 40 percent of the land is designated for open space. The UPIS was transferred at the former site of the Narra Dormitory inside UP Diliman proper.

The U.P. Town Center was developed in three phases. The mall opened after the first phase was completed in October 2013. The mall was completed in May 2016.

== Architecture ==
The architectural design and master planning of the U.P. Town Center was done by the international architectural firm Benoy.

== Facilities and tenants ==
The U.P. Town Center is marketed as the "first and only university town center" in the Philippines, primarily targeting students from universities and other educational institutions along Katipunan Avenue, such as the University of the Philippines Diliman, Ateneo de Manila University and Miriam College.

Shortly after the first phase of the complex was opened, most of the tenants were restaurants and other dining outlets. In November 2013, there were 30 tenants, 28 of which were dining outlets and only two retail stores. By this time, Ayala Malls reportedly prioritized new restaurant and dining brands over popular fast-food chains and restaurants since many of these brands already have outlets along Katipunan Avenue.

When the second phase was completed, numerous retail brands primarily selling fashion, sports, tech, and stationery goods or services targeting millennials opened stores at the U.P. Town Center. It has a 4DX cinema which opened in 2016.

U.P. Town Center contains one supermarket: the membership-exclusive Landers Superstore. The Landers branch at UPTC, which opened in 2022, is the first Landers store to be located in an Ayala mall. It also formerly housed a Merkado Supermarket branch, a joint-venture between Ayala and Puregold, until said branch closed in 2026 following the expiration of the agreement between the two companies.
