= Veterans Memorial Medical Center =

Government hospital in Quezon City, Philippines

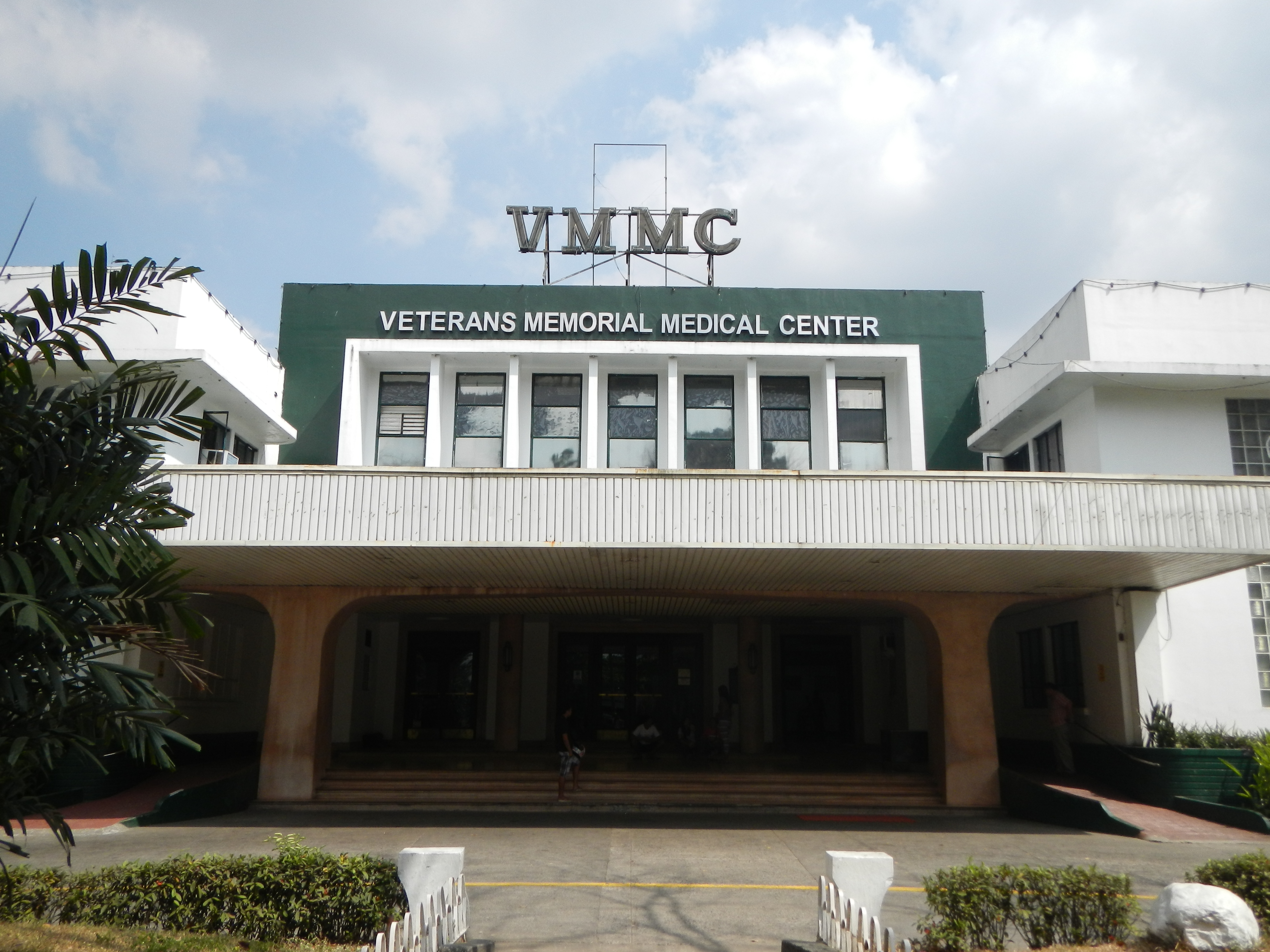

- Location within Metro Manila Location within Luzon Location within Philippines

Geography
- Location: Quezon City, Philippines
- Coordinates: 14°39′23″N 121°02′25″E

Services
- Emergency department: Yes

History
- Founded: November 20, 1955; 70 years ago

Links
- Website: www.vmmc.gov.ph

The Veterans Memorial Medical Center (formerly known as Veterans Memorial Hospital and commonly abbreviated as VMMC) is a hospital in Quezon City, Philippines. It was established on November 20, 1955 with full US Government assistance under the US Veterans Administration to provide quality hospitalization, medical care and treatment to Filipino veterans as provided by U.S. public law. The patients were originally those who suffered from service-connected disabilities arising from their services with the USAFFE, recognized guerrilla units, Philippine Scouts, and Army of the Philippines, which was later extended to AFP retirees and their dependents.

== History ==
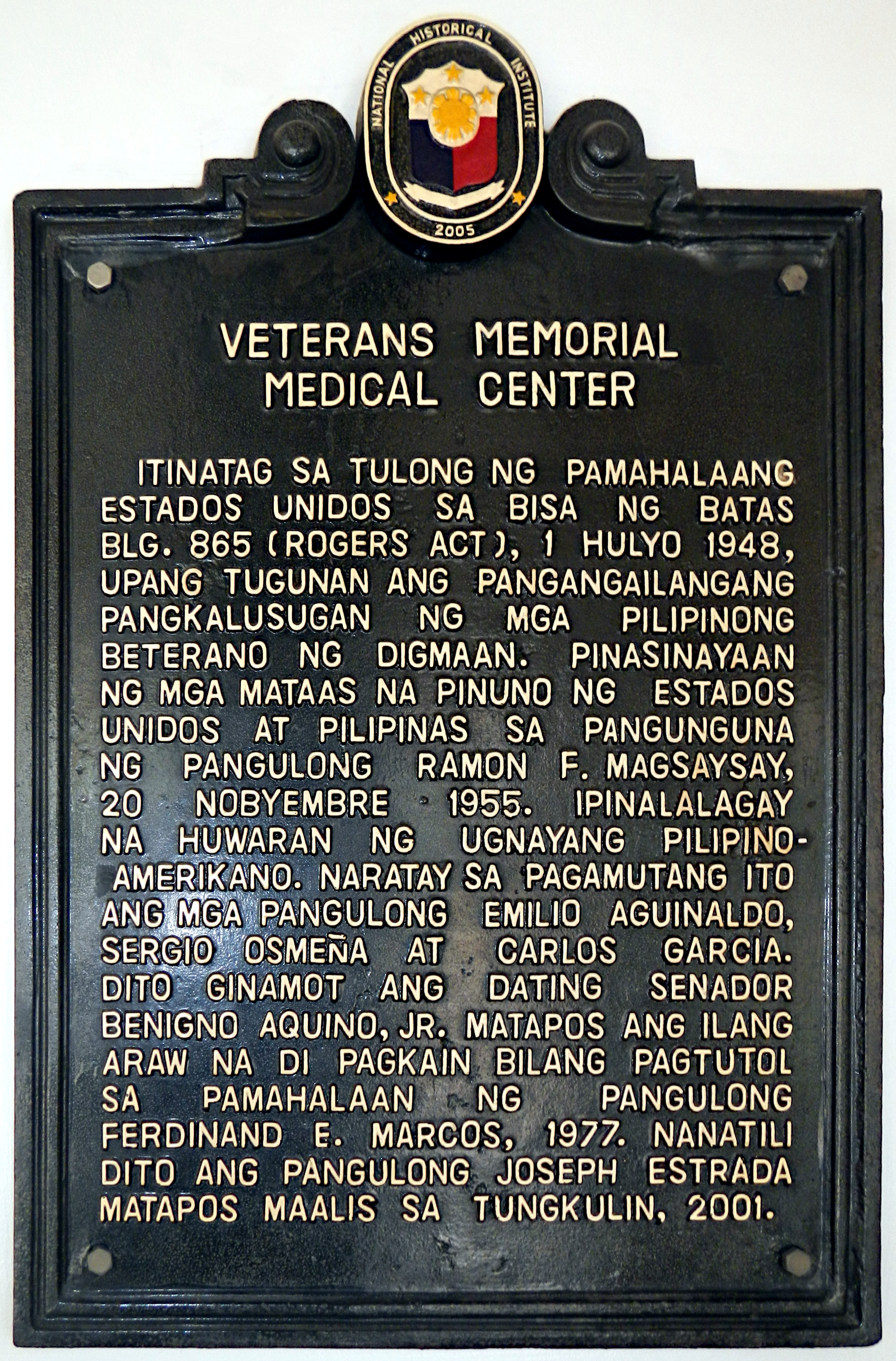
Historical marker

The Veterans Memorial Medical Center was established pursuant to Public Law 865, 80th U.S. Congress on July 8, 1948, which provided $9.4 million for the construction of a hospital facility with the land to be donated by the Philippine government. The law was implemented in the country by an agreement between the U.S. and the Philippines signed by then Pres. Elpidio Quirino and the U.S. Ambassador to the Philippines Myron Cowen. Various amendments have been introduced and the latest is Republic Act 6948 which has liberalized the definition of veterans which now includes the Armed Forces of the Philippines (AFP) retirees. Likewise, the hospitalization benefit was extended to veteran dependents. It is one of three units under the Philippine Veterans Affairs Office (PVAO). PVAO is a bureau under the Department of National Defense. The other two units under PVAO are the PVAO Proper, and Military Shrines Service.

The 55-hectare (140-acre) land was originally intended to be the location of Executive Mansion or the new Malacañan Palace on the original masterplan of Quezon City in 1939. It is now being eyed to be privatized as part of the Quezon City Central Business District Redevelopment Plan or Triangle Park.

The North Avenue station of the Metro Manila Subway is situated at the Veterans Golf Course in VMMC.

== Service coverage ==
Filipino veterans covered under this program include:

1. The Philippine Revolutionary Forces that took up arms against the Spaniards and the Americans during the past Philippine revolutions and wars,
2. Members of the First Philippine National Guards, either before or after its integration into the Army of the United States of America,
3. Filipino citizens who were enlisted and or commissioned and served during World War I under the Allied Armed Forces,
4. Philippine Scouts who were in the service prior to October 6, 1945, with wartime service,
5. USAFFE with wartime service in the Philippines,
6. Recognized World War II guerrilla units in the Philippines and
7. AFP units that participated in the Korean War.

All that a patient needs to present in seeking admission is a certificate of his military service from the Philippine Veterans Board and this plus his marriage certificate and birth certificate of minor child if the dependent is in need of hospital care. Emergency cases, however, may be brought to the hospital directly after which pertinent papers may be secured later on.

== Sources ==
- Department of National Defense Publication, 1962 Edition
