= Ayala Land =

Philippine real estate company

Ayala Land Inc.

- Tower One & Exchange Plaza, site of the headquarters of Ayala Land
- Type: Subsidiary
- Traded as: PSE: ALI
- Industry: Real estate
- Founded: June 30, 1988; 38 years ago in Manila, Philippines
- Headquarters: 28th to 35th floors, Tower One & Exchange Plaza, 6767 Ayala Avenue corner Paseo de Roxas, Makati, Philippines
- Area served: Philippines
- Key people: Fernando M. Zóbel de Ayala (Chairman); Anna Ma. Margarita B. Dy (President)
- Revenue: ▲ ₱180.74 billion (FY 2024)
- Net income: ▲ ₱28.23 billion (FY 2024)
- Total assets: ▲ ₱918.75 billion (FY 2024)
- Parent: Ayala Corporation
- Website: ayalaland.com.ph

Ayala Land, Inc. (ALI) is a Philippine real estate company that is a publicly-traded subsidiary of Ayala Corporation. Its core businesses are in strategic landbank management, residential development, retail shopping centers, corporate businesses, and hotels & resorts. Support businesses are in construction and property management. ALI also derives other income from its investment activities and sale of non-core assets. In April 2015, ALI bought a minority stake in Malaysian property developer MCT Bhd. in a ₱1.9-billion (US$43-million) deal, that is raised to 66.3% as of 2024. Ayala Land trades under the ticker symbol "ALI" on the Philippine Stock Exchange.

Ayala Land, Inc. is one of the largest property developers in the Philippines. It is a real estate developer that creates master-planned communities that promote sustainable development.

== Ownership ==
Excluding 2,372,887,399 common & 624,166,452 preferred Treasury shares, updated Top 20 beneficial ownership shareholding structure as of March 31, 2026, with Public Ownership (of common shares) at 45.25% and Foreign Percentage at 12.3327% ( maximum 40% ):

Major Shareholder	% of Total*	Common Shares	Preferred Shares*
Ayala Corporation	73.8756%	7,622,336,687	12,163,180,640
PCD** Nominee (Foreign)	12.2255%	3,274,257,207	—
PCD** Nominee (Filipino)	11.2807%	3,021,233,143	—
Government Service Insurance System	0.5838%	—	156,350,871
Ayalaland Hotels & Resorts Corp.	0.4342%	116,298,039	—
ESOP 2023	0.0632%	16,936,132	—
The Local Government of Cebu	0.0584%	15,628,093	—
PCD** Nominee (Foreign)- HSBC Manila branch	0.0562%	—	15,051,000
PCD** Nominee (Foreign)- Deutsche Bank Manila branch	0.0510%	166,819,111	13,670,744
Social Security System	0.0432%	11,576,800	—
ESOP for various years	0.2296%	61,494,487	—
Emilio Lolito J. Tumbocon	0.0275%	7,361,509	—
Others - Filipino	0.8934%	171,432,196	67,853,273
Others - Foreign	0.1314%	8,959,352	26,221,779
Total Authorized (Par)	35,000,000,000 (₱21,500,000,000)	20,000,000,000 (₱1.00)	15,000,000,000 (₱0.10)
Total Outstanding & Subscribed	26,782,206,756 (₱15,584,165,279.7)	14,339,932,449 (₱14,339,932,449)	12,442,328,307 (₱1,244,232,830.7)
Total Voting Equity*	26,782,206,756 (100%)	14,339,878,449 (53.54%)	12,442,328,307 (46.46%)

* In Gamboa v. Finance Secretary Teves (G.R. No. 176579 | June 28, 2011) and affirmed in Roy vs. Herbosa (G.R. No. 207246, April 18, 2017), the Supreme Court of the Philippines ruled that under Section 11, Article XII of the Constitution, “capital” in a public utility refers only to shares entitled to vote in the election of directors. Thus, Preferred shares that have been vested with such power are included in the relevant computations, in addition to common shares that naturally are appurtenant with voting privileges in every aspect.
** While the Philippine Central Depository (PCD) is listed a major shareholder, it is more of a trustee-nominee for all shares lodged in the PCD system rather than a single owner/shareholder. Major legal owner shareholders (i.e. those who have at least 5% of outstanding capital stock with voting rights) hidden, if any, under the PCD system are checked/identified and are disclosed with the Definitive Information Statement companies are submitting annually to the local bourse and Securities and Exchange Commission
