= Kamuning Footbridge =

Pedestrian footbridge in Quezon City, Philippines

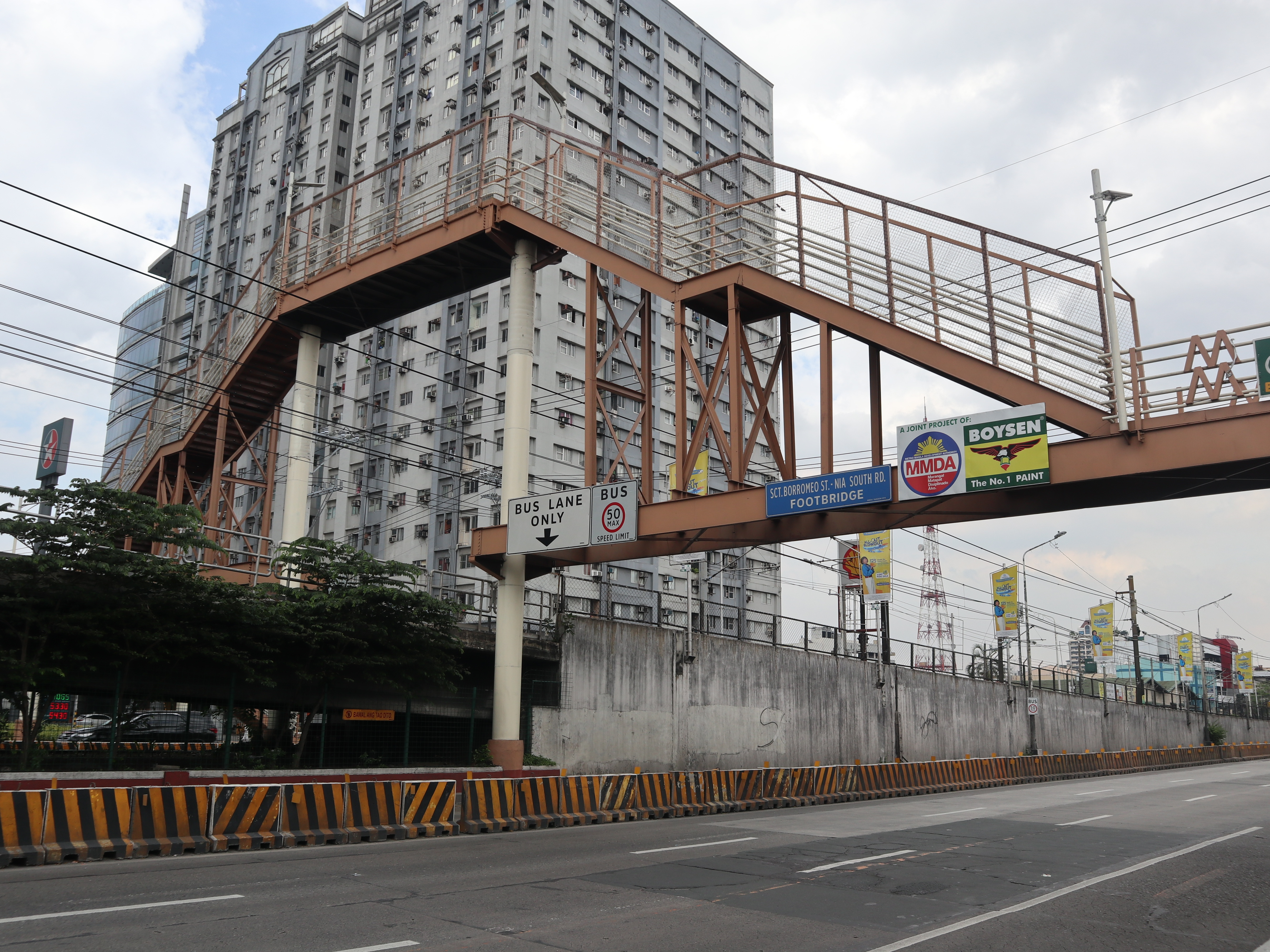
- The footbridge, taken in 2021
- Coordinates: 14.6370°N 121.0421°E
- Carried: Pedstrians
- Crossed: Epifanio de los Santos Avenue
- Locale: South Triangle and Pinyahan, Quezon City, Philippines
- Other names: Scout Borromeo–NIA South Road Footbridge; EDSA–Kamuning Footbridge; Mount Kamuning
- Owner: Metropolitan Manila Development Authority

Characteristics
- Material: Steel
- Height: 9 meters (30 ft) (clearance over railway)

History
- Constructed by: BF Corporation
- Construction end: 2018
- Opened: 2019
- Demolished: 2026

Location
- Interactive map of Kamuning Footbridge

The Kamuning Footbridge, officially the Scout Borromeo–NIA South Road Footbridge and also known as the EDSA–Kamuning Footbridge, was a steel pedestrian footbridge spanning EDSA in Quezon City, Philippines.

Constructed by the Metropolitan Manila Development Authority (MMDA) in October 2018, the footbridge is 9 meters (30 ft) high, located near Manuel L. Quezon University, the National Irrigation Administration Complex, and the GMA–Kamuning station. It connects Scout Borromeo Street in Barangay South Triangle to NIA South Road in Barangay Pinyahan, spanning both EDSA and the MRT-3's at-grade tracks. Its steep height and appearance has gained public attention, with many online comments remarking that it is inconvenient to use and discriminates against people with disabilities, senior citizens, children, and those who suffer from vertigo. As a result, it was mockingly nicknamed as "Mount Kamuning" and a "stairway to heaven" by both the public and local media, leading to mock "hiking" stunts and being the subject of online ridicule.

The MMDA defended the design, stating it was necessary to discourage jaywalking and alleged robberies in the area, and "only intended for able-bodied pedestrians". Suggestions to rectify the issue by installing elevators or escalators were raised but not addressed due to budget constraints.

The footbridge is planned to be demolished and rebuilt following a directive from President Bongbong Marcos in June 2025 to have the Department of Transportation (DOTr) replace the footbridge with a design more accessible and convenient to road users and commuters. The new Kamuning footbridge and busway concourse were opened to the public on March 5, 2026, with the closure and demolition of the old footbridge being underway.

== History ==
Transportation Secretary Vince Dizon climbs the footbridge.

President Bongbong Marcos views the footbridge from GMA–Kamuning station, later ordering the footbridge's demolition, June 2025

Construction on the footbridge began in 2018. While it was being constructed, photos of the half-built footbridge went viral online in November 2018, as people criticized the footbridge's steep height and appearance, raising concerns on how it would be inconvenient for people with disabilities, senior citizens, and pregnant women. The footbridge has a maximum clearance height of 9 meters (30 ft) high and has a project cost of ₱10 million and was constructed by the BF Corporation owned by former MMDA chairperson Bayani Fernando.

In response, MMDA general manager Jojo Garcia stated that the project was designed to prevent jaywalking along EDSA and reduce incidents of robbery in the area. He defended the footbridge by describing it as intended for "able-bodied pedestrians seeking to cross the road quickly and safely" and claimed that the footbridge provides "maximum comfort for pedestrians".

Garcia also addressed concerns about the steep height of the structure, explaining that it is located at a portion where the MRT-3 run near ground level, necessitating a gap of stating that it is located at a segment where the MRT-3 is near ground level and that the footbridge must maintain a clearance of 3 to 4 meters (9.8 to 13.1 ft) above the MRT-3 tracks. He added that the decision to construct the footbridge out of metal was because it was "easier to construct" and "cheaper". MMDA spokesperson Celine Pialago further defended the project, calling it as the agency's "best compromise" to discourage "reckless or lazy" pedestrian behavior, emphasizing that the MMDA is prioritizing public safety over convenience.

Following the initial backlash, the MMDA added landing areas for pedestrians to rest while climbing the footbridge. The MMDA also considered installing elevators and escalators to address concerns about the footbridge's steepness. However, Garcia stated that there was no available budget for such features.

On April Fools' Day in 2019, two individuals dressed up as mountain climbers with hiking gear and backpacks and gave a satirical account of the "hike" to the media. One of them also recounted that the footbridge vibrates whenever MRT-3 trains pass below it.

In January 2022, Dirk Janssen, the consul general of the Netherlands in San Francisco posted an old photo of the footbridge on Twitter, criticizing it with the caption: "No hay mejor manera de dejar claro a los peatones que no importan" (transl. There is no better way to make it clear to pedestrians that they don’t matter.)

In January 2025, a hiking app satirically listed "Mount Kamuning" and "Mount Shaw Boulevard" as peaks, describing the former as the "urban Everest of EDSA" and a "high-altitude reminder of the uphill battle for a more pedestrian-friendly city".

In June 2025, following a visit to GMA–Kamuning station, Philippine president Bongbong Marcos ordered the Department of Transportation (DOTr) to demolish and replace the footbridge to be more accessible and convenient to road users and commuters. The DOTr has bared plans to build a much lower footbridge that will use elevators and provide direct access to the Kamuning stop of the EDSA Carousel. The new footbridge was opened on March 5, 2026.

== See also ==
- Shaw Boulevard station – an MRT station nicknamed as "Mount Shaw" or "Mount Shaw Boulevard" due to its steep height and long stairwells
