= GMA–Kamuning station =

Train station in Quezon City, Philippines

Coordinates: 14°38′06.52″N 121°02′36.10″E

GMA–Kamuning	YL03
- The station's platform area in October 2026, viewed from the southbound platform

General information
- Other names: Kamuning
- Location: EDSA, South Triangle and Pinyahan; Quezon City, Metro Manila; Philippines
- Owner: Department of Transportation
- Operator: Department of Transportation
- Line: MRT Line 3
- Platforms: 2 (2 side)
- Tracks: 2
- Connections: E Kamuning

Construction
- Structure type: Elevated
- Parking: Yes (Victoria Sports Tower, Anchor Tower, MLQU)
- Accessible: Concourse: All entrances Platforms: All platforms

History
- Opened: December 15, 1999; 26 years ago

Services
Preceding station	Manila MRT	Following station
Quezon Avenue towards North Avenue	MRT Line 3	Araneta Center–Cubao towards Taft Avenue
Track layout
Location

GMA–Kamuning station, also known as Kamuning station, is an elevated Metro Rail Transit (MRT) station located on the MRT Line 3 (MRT-3) system at the boundary of barangays South Triangle and Pinyahan in the Scout Area of Diliman, Quezon City. The station derives its name from the nearby barangay of Kamuning and the road sharing the same name, as well as the adjacent GMA Network Center, the headquarters of media company GMA Network.

The station is the third station for trains headed towards Taft Avenue and the eleventh for trains headed towards North Avenue.

== History ==
GMA–Kamuning Avenue station was opened on December 15, 1999, as part of MRT's initial section from North Avenue to Buendia.

On July 15, 2024, the Kamuning stop of the EDSA Carousel was opened adjacent to the station on the EDSA median. Access to the bus stop is provided exclusively through the station.

In 2025, the station's name was adopted for the GMA Network's official subreddit, r/KamuningStation.

== Nearby landmarks ==
The station is near Timog Avenue, known for being an entertainment district of Quezon City, as well as the GMA Network Center, Manuel L. Quezon University, Victoria Sports Tower, Anchor Tower, and Department of Public Works and Highways – Quezon City 2nd District Engineering Office. It is near Quezon City's Diliman area, where Public-Private Partnership Center, Land Transportation Office, Philippine Statistics Authority, National Irrigation Administration, and Philippine Heart Center in Triangle Park are accessible via East Avenue. National Electrification Administration, National Water Resources Board, and Dangerous Drugs Board along Internal Road are also nearby.

== Transportation links ==
The Kamuning stop of the EDSA Carousel station is located just next to the MRT station and is accessible through it. Jeepneys serve the area, with a northbound terminal at the intersection of EDSA and East Avenue, and both jeepneys and buses operate along the East and Timog Avenue routes. Bus terminals such as those of JAM Liner and JAC Liner are located nearby, just south of EDSA's intersection with East and Timog Avenues. Tricycles ply the nearby inner roads.

== Gallery ==
GMA–Kamuning station from street level

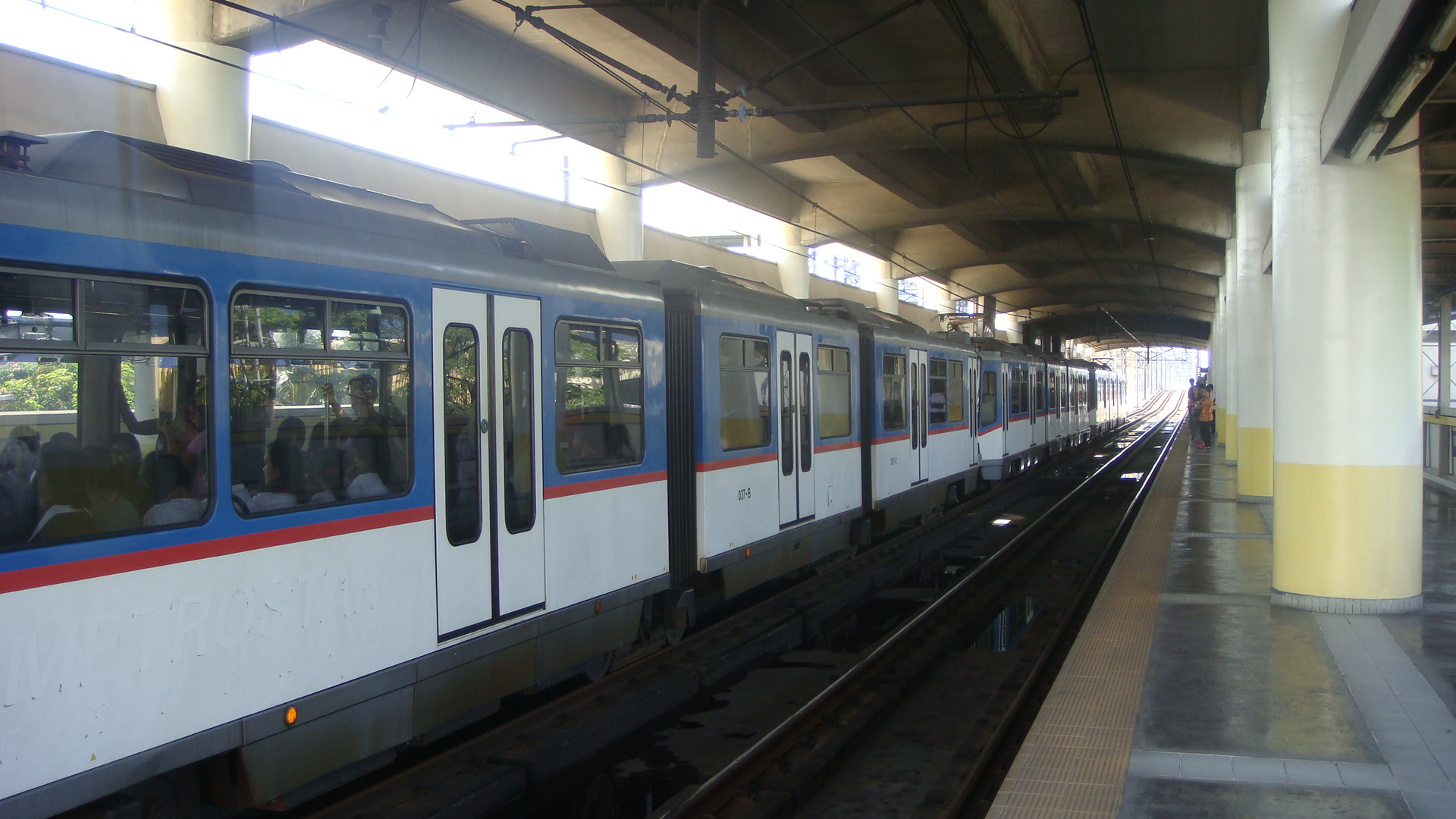
A train serving the station

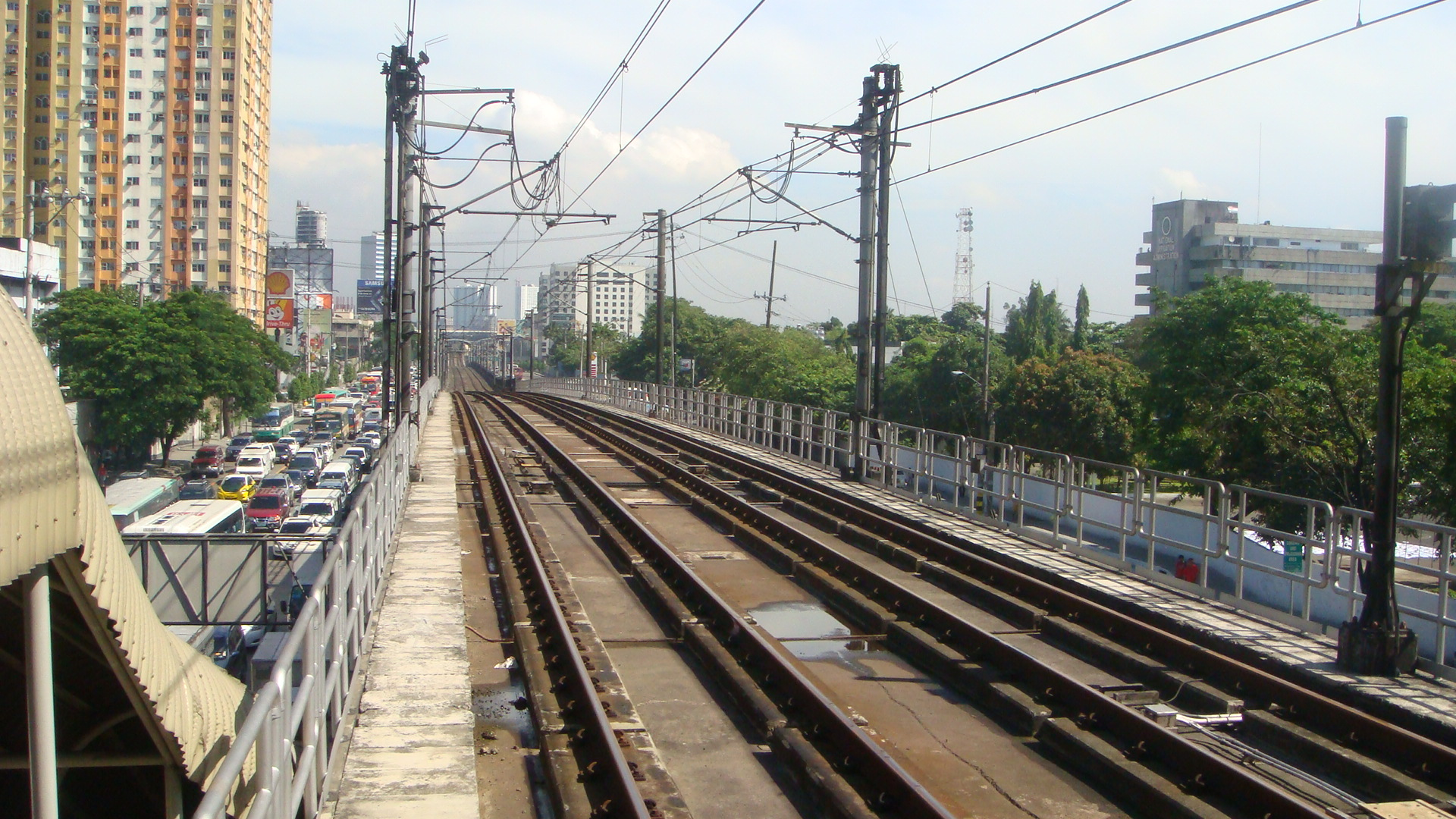
View of Kamuning from the station

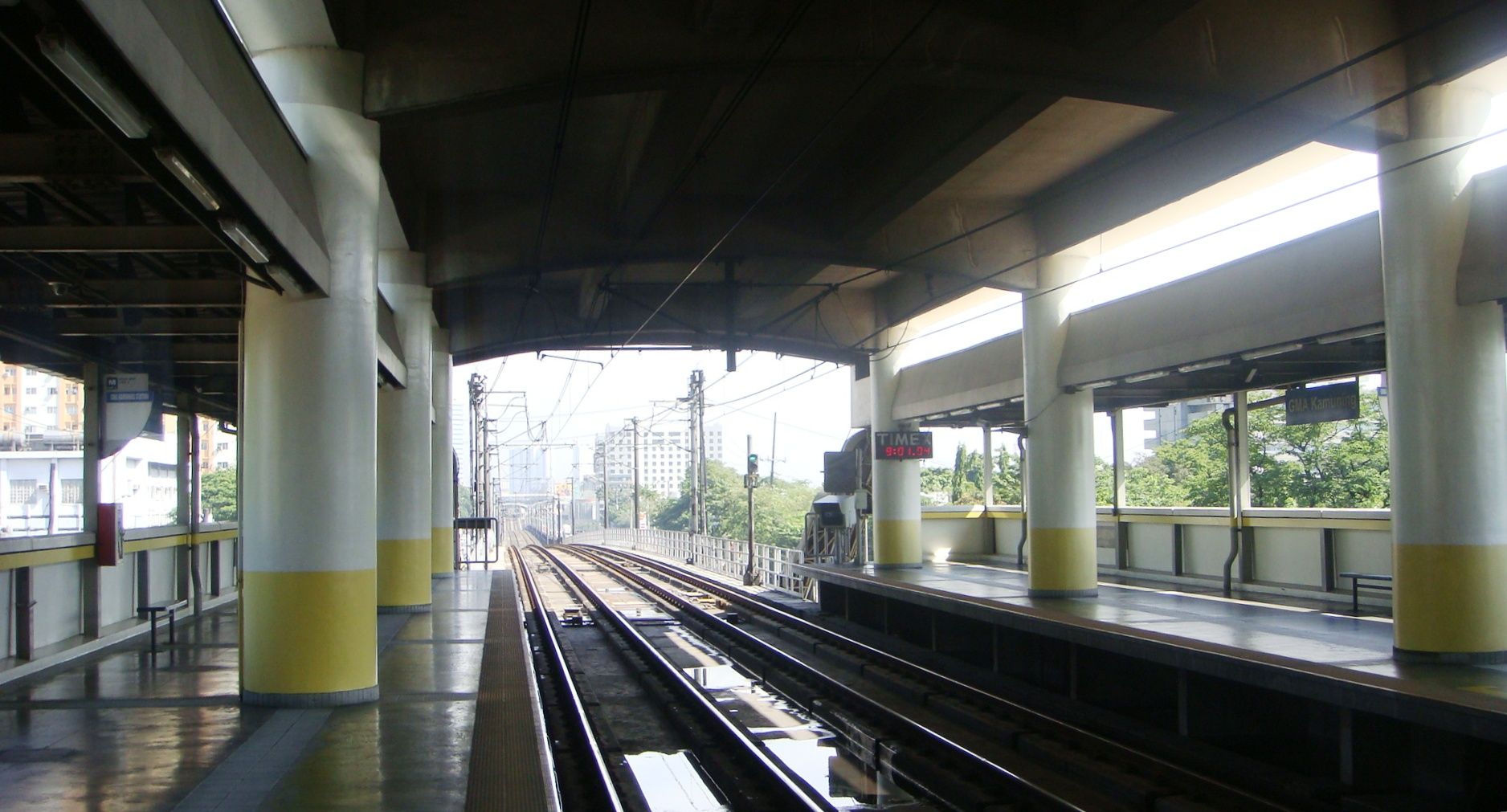
Station platforms

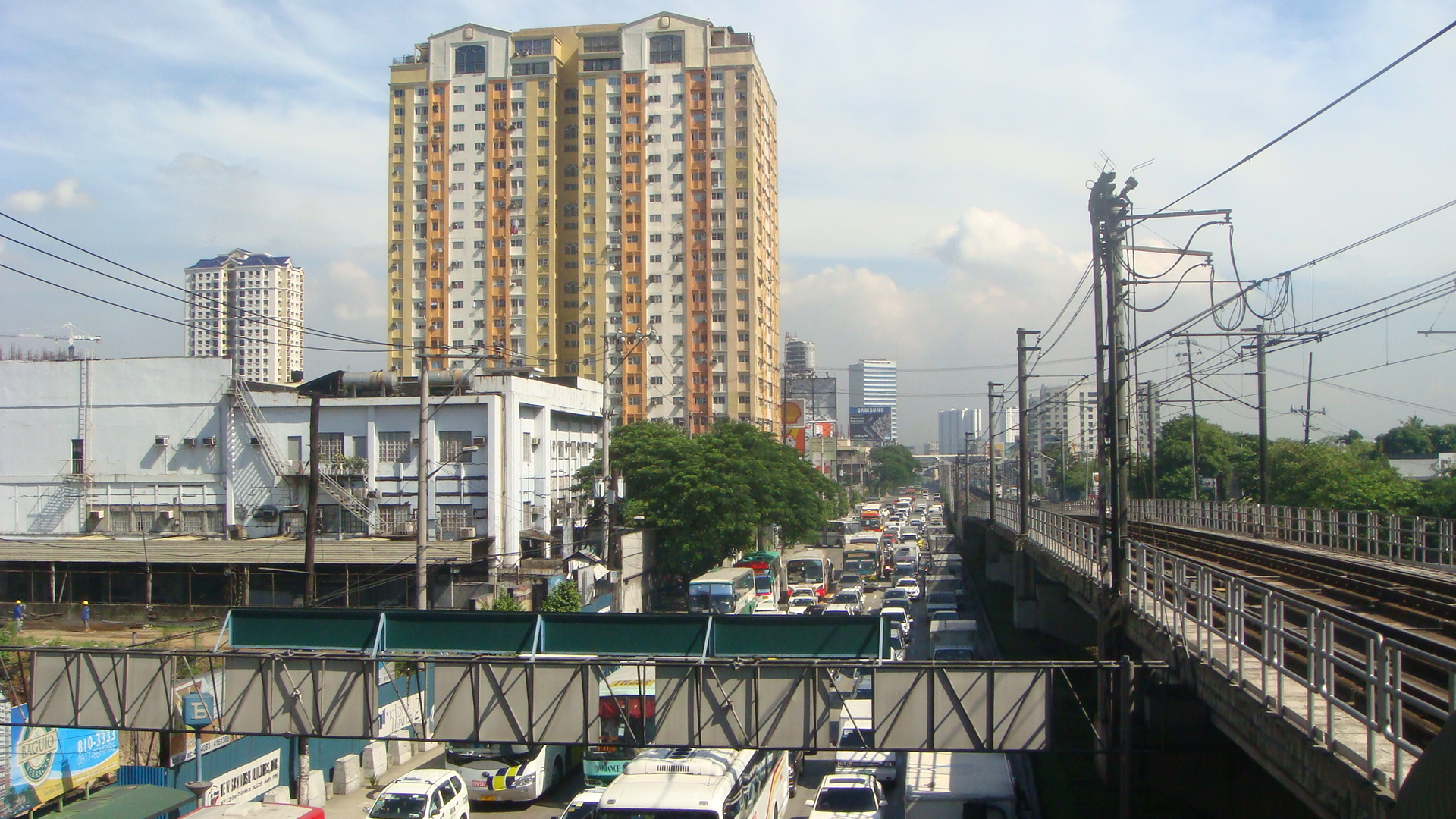
View of buildings outside Kamuning station

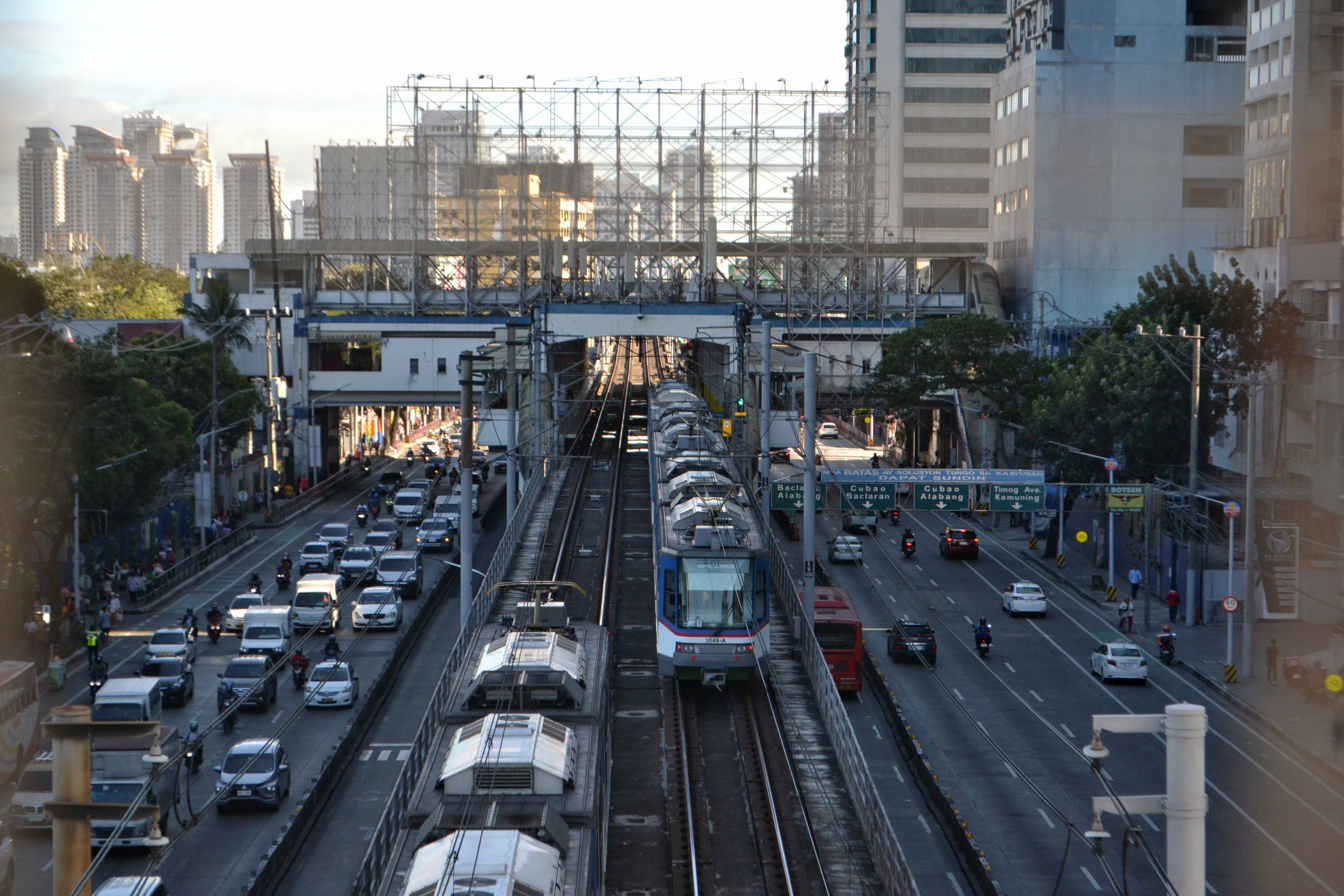
The station from the Kamuning Footbridge

== See also ==
- List of rail transit stations in Metro Manila
- Manila Metro Rail Transit System Line 3
- Kamuning Footbridge
