= EDSA Carousel =

Bus rapid transit system in Metro Manila

- 1
- An EDSA Carousel bus at North Avenue bus stop

Overview
- System: Mega Manila Consortium Corporation; ES Transport and Partners Consortium
- Operator: Department of Transportation; Metropolitan Manila Development Authority
- Began service: July 1, 2020; 6 years ago
- Predecessors: Various private bus companies via EDSA (as LTFRB franchise route)

Route
- Route type: Bus rapid transit
- Locale: Metro Manila, Philippines
- Start: Monumento
- Via: EDSA; Macapagal Boulevard
- End: PITX
- Length: 28 km (17 mi)
- Stops: 24

Service
- Operates: 24/7 service
- Daily ridership: 182,655 (2025)
- Annual patronage: 66,669,287 (2025)

The EDSA Carousel, also known as Route 1 and formerly and still referred to as Route E, is a bus rapid transit (BRT) system, part of several bus routes in Metro Manila. It is situated along EDSA (C-4 Road) and other roads, running on a dedicated right-of-way called the EDSA Busway, separated from normal road traffic in most of its stretch by concrete barriers and steel bollards on the innermost lane.

Interim operations began on June 1, 2020, serving as a replacement of the former bus routes along EDSA, acting as an augmentation service to the MRT Line 3 due to the limited capacity restrictions put in place by the general community quarantine in Metro Manila as a result of the COVID-19 pandemic in the Philippines. Full operations began later on July 1, 2020. Intended to be largely served by bus stops along the median, some stops are temporarily served by bus stops on the curbside.

The EDSA Carousel carries up to 300,000 passengers daily. It is operated by the Mega Manila Consortium Corporation and ES Transport and Partners Consortium under the supervision of the Department of Transportation (DOTr) and Metropolitan Manila Development Authority (MMDA).

== History ==
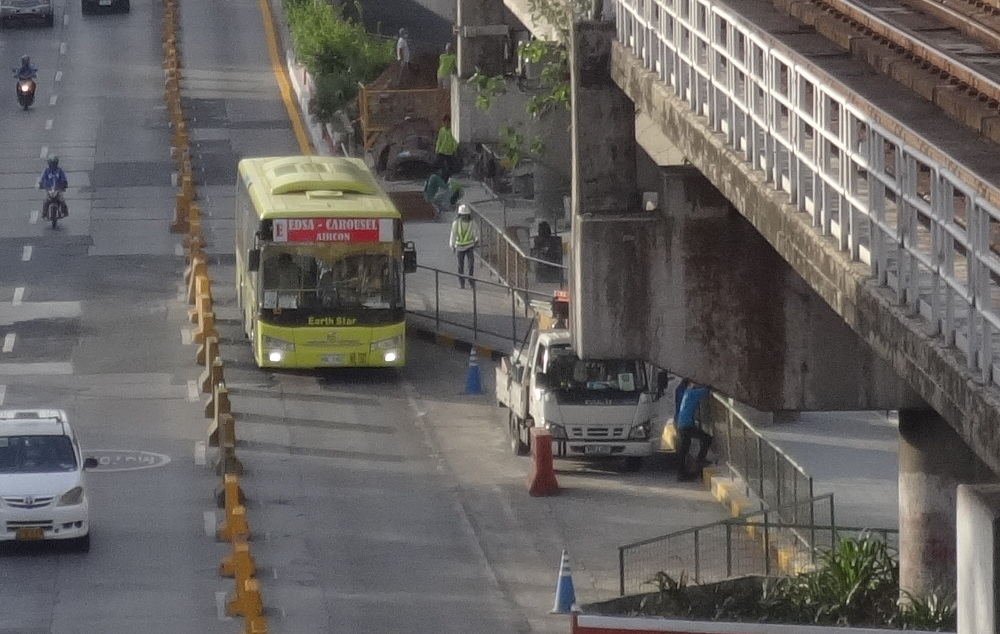
An EDSA Carousel bus near Mega Q-Mart bus stop, which was still under construction at that time.

=== Background ===
Epifanio de los Santos Avenue is the main thoroughfare of Metro Manila. Traffic congestion has always been a concern in the area and since 2007, the MMDA ordered buses to stay on the two right-most lanes of the road. Plastic barriers were later added in 2016.

A proposal for a bus rapid transit (BRT) system using funds from the World Bank was approved in 2017. EDSA was intended to be the second phase of the implementation of the bus rapid transit system, following Quezon Avenue. Line 2, known as the Central Corridor, will be eventually realized as the EDSA Carousel.

=== Development ===
On March 16, 2020, the Inter-Agency Task Force for the Management of Emerging Infectious Diseases (IATF-EID) imposed a community quarantine due to the COVID-19 pandemic, which halted almost all public and private transportation using EDSA. This paved the way for the immediate construction of the EDSA Busway.

The EDSA Carousel line is distinct from the World Bank-funded BRT project.

=== Opening and operation ===
On July 1, 2020, the EDSA Carousel line, also designated as Route E, started its interim operations with a total of fifteen stops in a dedicated bus lane completed by the Metropolitan Manila Development Authority.

Timeline
| Date opened | Project | Stop(s) |
|---|---|---|
| June 1, 2020 | Interim operations (temporary curbside stops) | Monumento to Quezon Avenue: Monumento, Bagong Barrio, Balintawak, Kaingin Road, Roosevelt, North Avenue, Quezon Avenue; Buendia to PITX: Buendia, Ayala, Magallanes, Evangelista/Malibay, Taft Avenue, Roxas Boulevard, Macapagal Avenue, SM Mall of Asia, PITX |
| July 1, 2020 | Full operations, opening of first median stops | Main Avenue, Santolan, Ortigas, Guadalupe |
| September 5, 2020 | Opening of median stops and additional stops | North Avenue, Quezon Avenue, Nepa Q-Mart |
| Late 2020 | Opening of median stops and additional stops | Monumento, Bagong Barrio, Balintawak, Kaingin Road, and Roosevelt |
| November 22, 2021 | Opening of median stops and additional stops | Buendia |
| August 4, 2022 | Opening of median stops and additional stops | Taft Avenue and Roxas Boulevard |
| November 20, 2022 | Opening of median stops and additional stops | Ayala southbound curbside stop moved to One Ayala |
| January 2, 2023 | Opening of median stops and additional stops | Tramo |
| July 16, 2024 | Opening of median stops and additional stops | Philam and Kamuning |
| March 13, 2025 | EDSA Busway Concourse | SM North EDSA |
| October 1, 2025 | Additional northbound stop | SM Mall of Asia |
| March 5, 2026 | EDSA Busway Concourse | Kamuning |
| April 1, 2026 | EDSA Busway Concourse | SM Megamall |

In June 2025, the DOTr stated that the controversial Kamuning Footbridge will be rebuilt with direct access to the Kamuning bus stop of the EDSA Carousel. It reopened on March 5, 2026.

==== Rehabilitation ====
On August 7, 2025, then-Transportation Secretary Vince Dizon announced that the rehabilitation of stations will begin in 2025, starting with the first phase involving the renovation of the Monumento, Bagong Barrio, North Avenue, and Guadalupe stops. The first three bus stops in Monumento, Bagong Barrio, and North Avenue opened on October 20, 2026, under then-Acting Transportation Secretary Giovanni Z. Lopez. The rehabilitated bus stop in Guadalupe followed suit on November 6, 2026, under Acting Transportation Secretary Vince Dizon.

During the inspection of the Guadalupe bus stop last November 2, 2026. Dizon announced that all remaining bus stops, including additional bus stops in Cubao, Magallanes, and PITX will be rehabilitated before the end of President Ferdinand Marcos Jr's term.

== Ridership ==
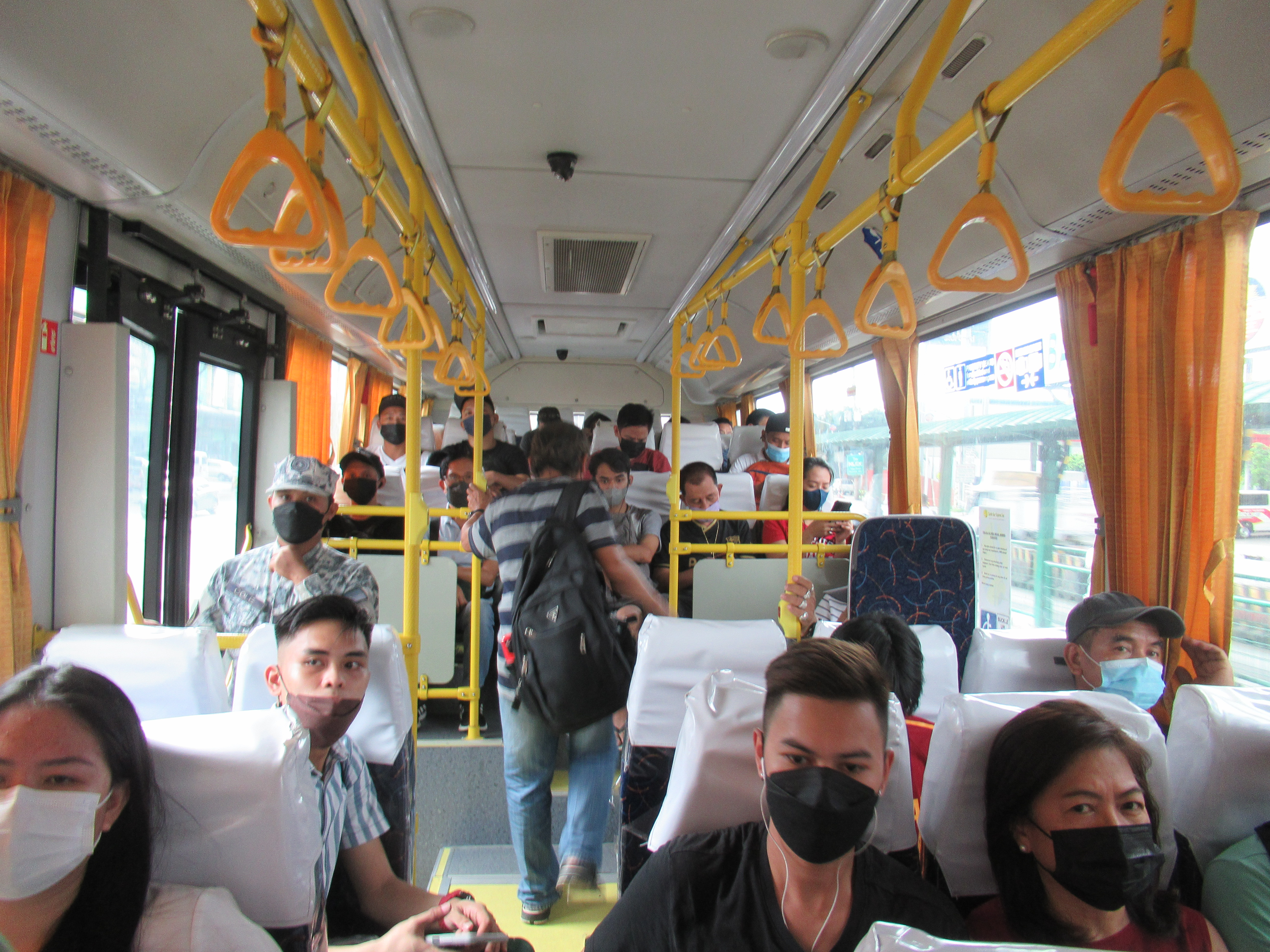
Inside an EDSA Carousel bus in 2022

Since the line's opening in June 2020, the total ridership of the line was 130,238,608 commuters within June 2020 to November 2022. From June to December 2020, total ridership has reached a daily average 41,000 to 60,000 passengers, and continued to rise throughout 2021, wherein the daily average of commuters using the line is 129,000 passengers, with its highest record reaching 160,000 passengers in June 2021. Total ridership in 2021 reached 47,104,197.

In 2022, the line's highest record reached a total of 404,010 passengers on October 24, 2022, while the average daily ridership through the year is 389,579 passengers. Total ridership also increased to a new record high, as the line served 80,832,186 passengers. In 2024, the daily passenger average of the EDSA Carousel for the year reached a total of 177,000 passengers, while the total annual ridership of the EDSA Carousel reached a total of 63,022,953 passengers. In 2025, the total annual ridership of the EDSA Carousel reached a total of 66,669,287 passengers, which is 5.79% higher compared to 2024's total ridership.

The DOTr reported in 2026 that the EDSA Carousel moves up to 300,000 passengers daily.

== Stops ==
The line initially had 15 bus stops on its interim launch, with additional stops added in the following months. As of March 13, 2025, 24 bus stops are currently operational. There are 87 operators and 751 authorized buses that serve the entire route.

Selected stops of the Busway also runs parallel to the MRT Line 3 and the northern section of the LRT Line 1. Plans are also underway to expand the Busway system by improving the accessibility and connectivity on various bus stops to nearby transport networks.

List of stops
| Name | Distance (km) | | Type | Connections | Location |
| Name | Between stops | Total | Type | Connections | Location |
|---|---|---|---|---|---|
| Monumento | — | 0.00 | Median (via footbridge) | Manila LRT: Monumento; Bus Routes: 9 14 35 37 42 54 Monumento | Caloocan |
| Bagong Barrio | 0.55 | 0.55 | Median (via footbridge) | Bus Routes: 9 37 Bagong Barrio | Caloocan |
| Balintawak | 1.55 | 2.10 | Median (via footbridge) | Manila LRT: Balintawak; Bus Routes: 5 8 9 13 19 20 21 22 37 38 40 52 Ayala Malls Cloverleaf | Quezon City |
| Kaingin Road | 0.80 | 2.90 | Median (via footbridge) | none | Quezon City |
| Roosevelt; Fernando Poe Jr. | 1.10 | 4.00 | Median (via footbridge) | Manila LRT: Fernando Poe Jr.; Bus Routes: 18 33 64 Fernando Poe Jr. | Quezon City |
| SM North EDSA | - | - | Median (via footbridge) | Manila LRT: North Triangle Common Station; Manila MRT: North Avenue MMS North Triangle Common Station; Bus Routes: 18 33 64 SM North EDSA | Quezon City |
| North Avenue | 1.50 | 5.50 | Median (via footbridge) | Manila LRT: North Triangle Common Station; Manila MRT: North Avenue MMS North Triangle Common Station; Bus Routes: 18 33 64 SM North EDSA | Quezon City |
| Philam QC; Ormoc | — | — | Median (via footbridge) | Manila MRT: MMS Quezon Avenue | Quezon City |
| Quezon Avenue | — | 6.80 | Median (via footbridge) | Manila MRT: Quezon Avenue MMS Quezon Avenue | Quezon City |
| Kamuning | — | — | Median (via footbridge and MRT station) | Manila MRT: GMA-Kamuning; Bus Routes: 6A NIA South Road | Quezon City |
| Nepa Q-Mart | — | 8.6 | Median (via footbridge) | Bus Routes: 3 EDSA | Quezon City |
| Main Avenue | 1.60 | 10.20 | Median (via footbridge) | none | Quezon City |
| Santolan; Santolan–Annapolis | 0.80 | 11.00 | Median (via footbridge) | Manila MRT: Santolan–Annapolis | Quezon City |
| Ortigas; SM Megamall | 2.40 | 13.40 | Median (via footbridge and MRT station) | Manila MRT: Ortigas 4 EDSA; Bus Routes: 2 Robinsons Galleria | Mandaluyong |
| Guadalupe (Note: Guadalupe bus stop is located on Guadalupe Bridge.) | 2.40 | 15.80 | Median (via footbridge and MRT station) | Manila MRT: Boni Guadalupe 5 Guadalupe; Pasig River Ferry Service: Guadalupe | Mandaluyong–Makati boundary |
| Buendia | — | — | Median (via footbridge) | Manila MRT: Buendia; Bus Routes: 17 42 Buendia MRT | Makati |
| Ayala; One Ayala | — | 18.80 | Curbside (northbound); Boarding Lane (southbound, inside One Ayala) | Manila MRT: Ayala; BGC Bus: EX01 L01 N01 NR17 NR01 W01 WR01 WR18 EDSA-Ayala; Bus Routes: 10 11 12 17 38 40 42 45 46 59 One Ayala; 62 63 EDSA-Ayala | Makati |
| Tramo (Note: Southbound lane only.) | — | — | Median (via footbridge) | Manila MRT: Taft Avenue EDSA | Pasay |
| Taft Avenue | — | 22.00 | Median (via footbridge) | Manila MRT: Taft Avenue EDSA | Pasay |
| Roxas Boulevard | — | — | Median (via footbridge) | Bus Routes: 5 6 7 14 23 27 30 34 43 52 Double Dragon Plaza; 22 35 45 46 47 49 Heritage Hotel | Pasay |
| SM Mall of Asia | — | 24.60 | Curbside | Bus Routes: 4 5 6 7 14 30 34 43 52 SM Mall of Asia | Pasay |
| DFA; Shell/Starbucks | — | — | Curbside | Bus Routes: 4 5 6 7 14 23 27 30 43 45 52 Bradco Avenue | Parañaque |
| Ayala Malls Manila Bay; Aseana City | — | — | Curbside | Bus Routes: 4 5 6 7 14 23 27 30 34 43 52 City of Dreams / Ayala Malls Manila Bay | Parañaque |
| PITX | — | 28.10 | Terminal | Manila MRT: MMS Asia World; Manila LRT: PITX; Bus Routes: 4 5 6 7 14 18 22 23 26 27 28 29 30 31 32 34 43 47 52 55 PITX | Parañaque |
Stops, stations and transit systems in italics are either under construction or proposed.

Notes

EDSA Carousel stops
Monumento (northern terminus)

Bagong Barrio

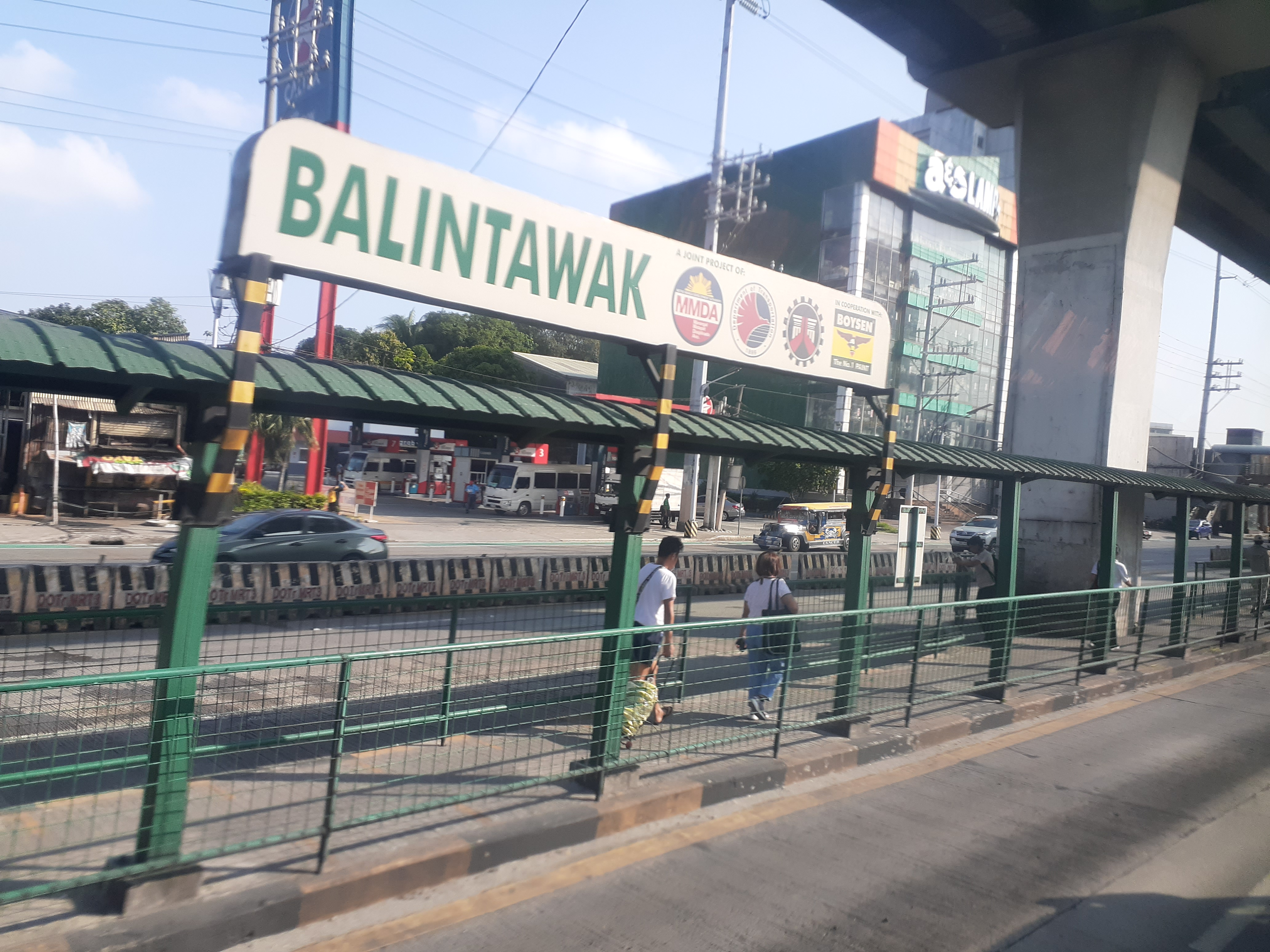
Balintawak

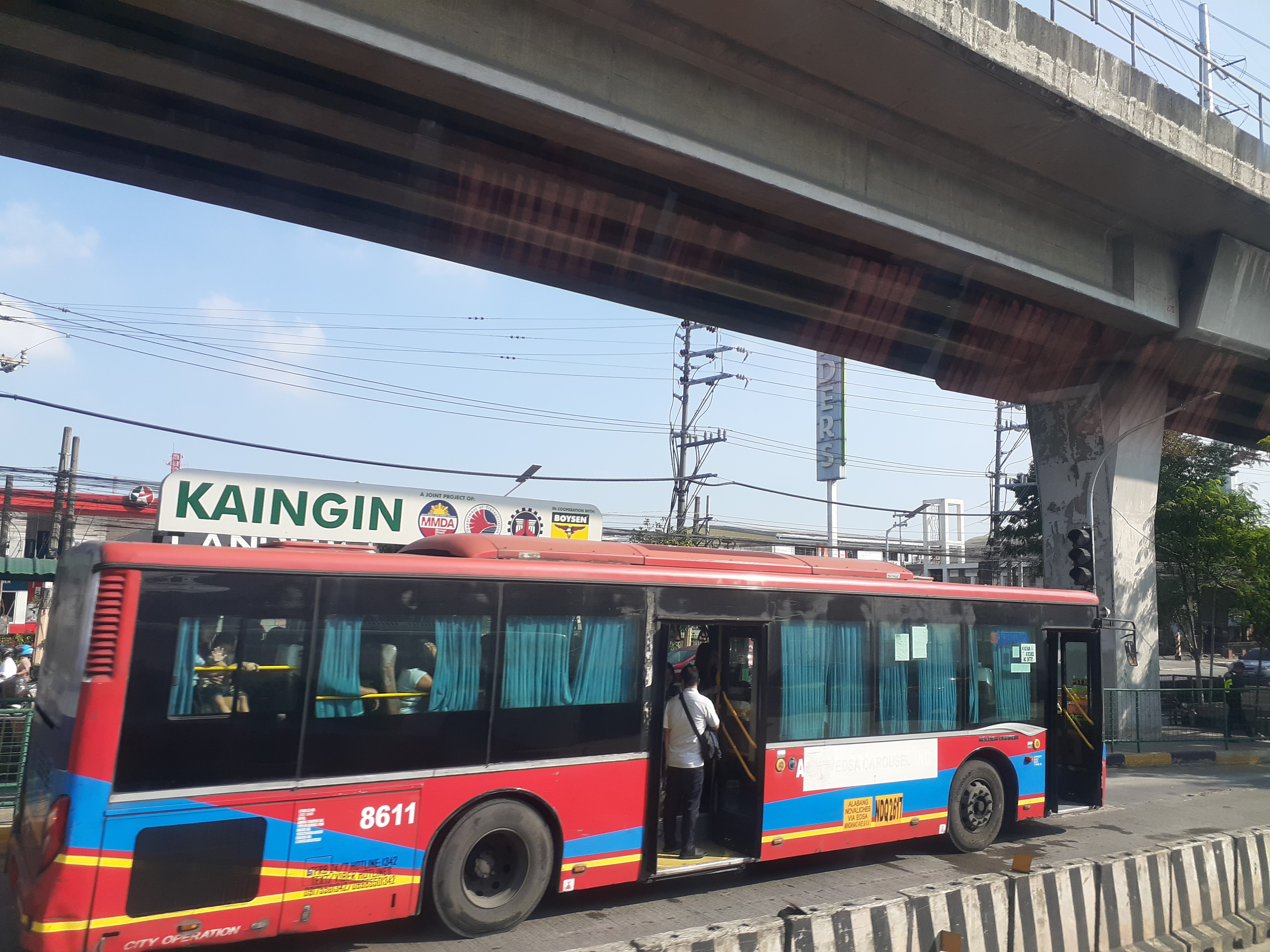
Kaingin

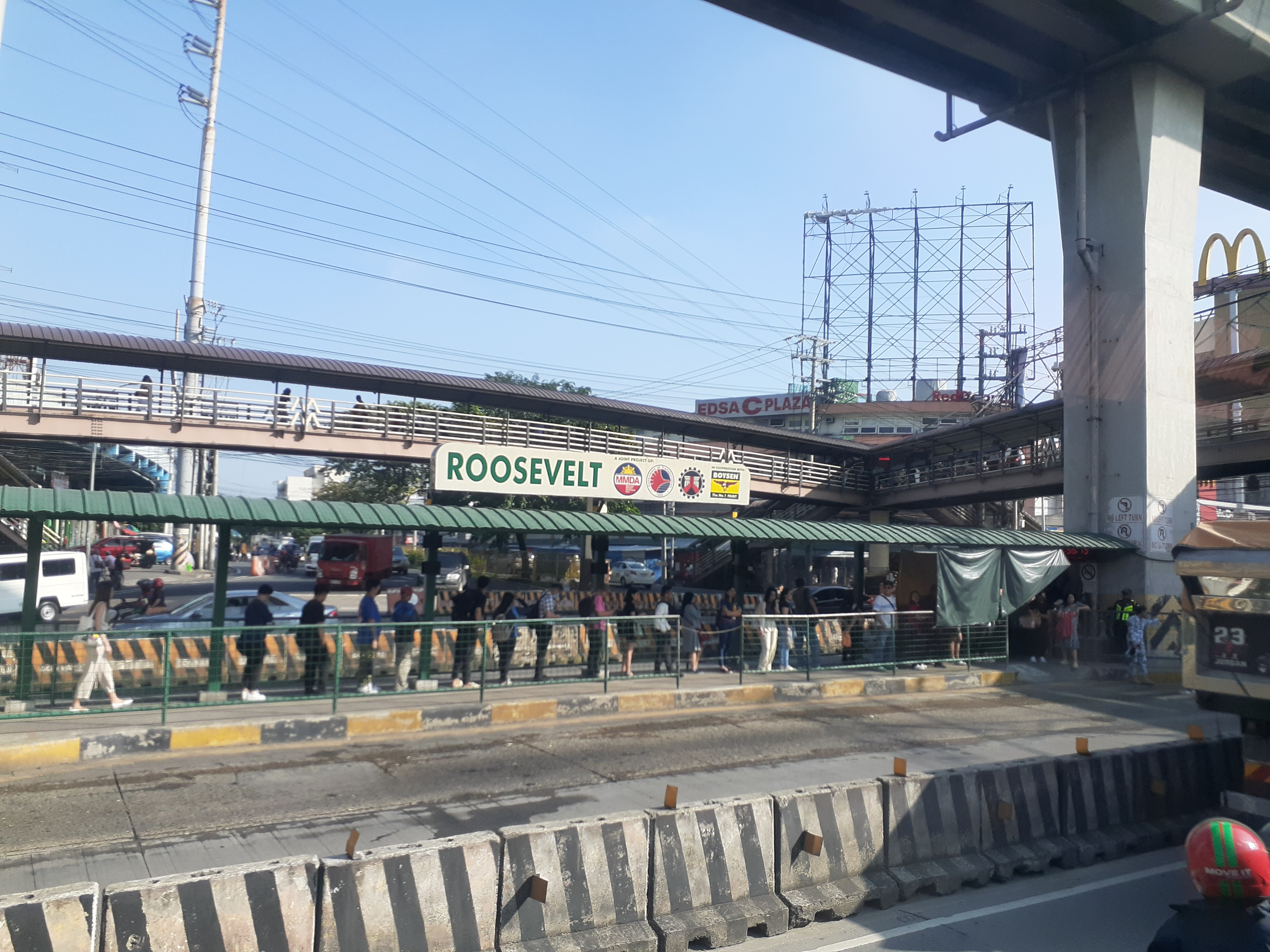
Roosevelt

SM North EDSA

North Avenue

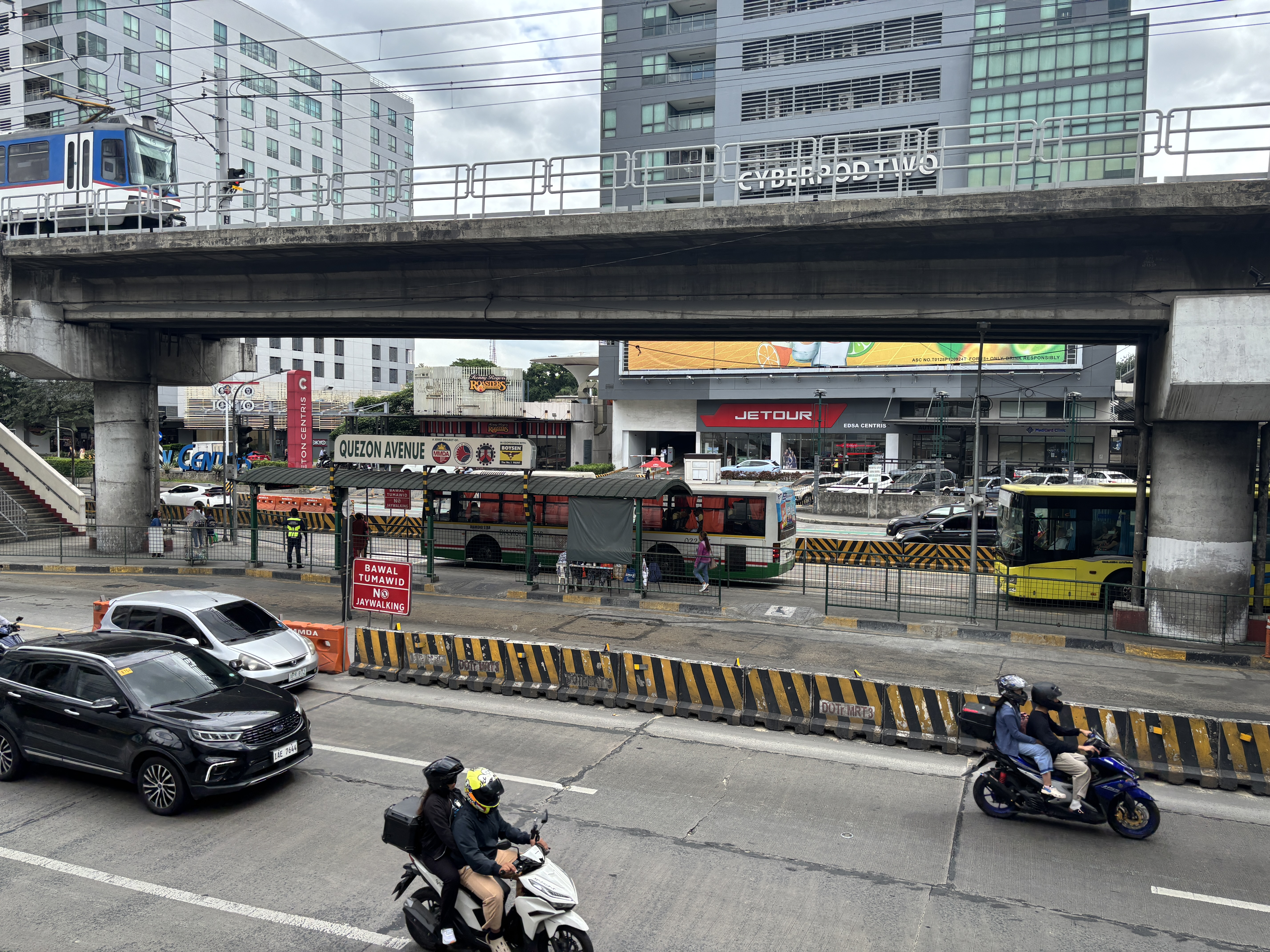
Quezon Avenue

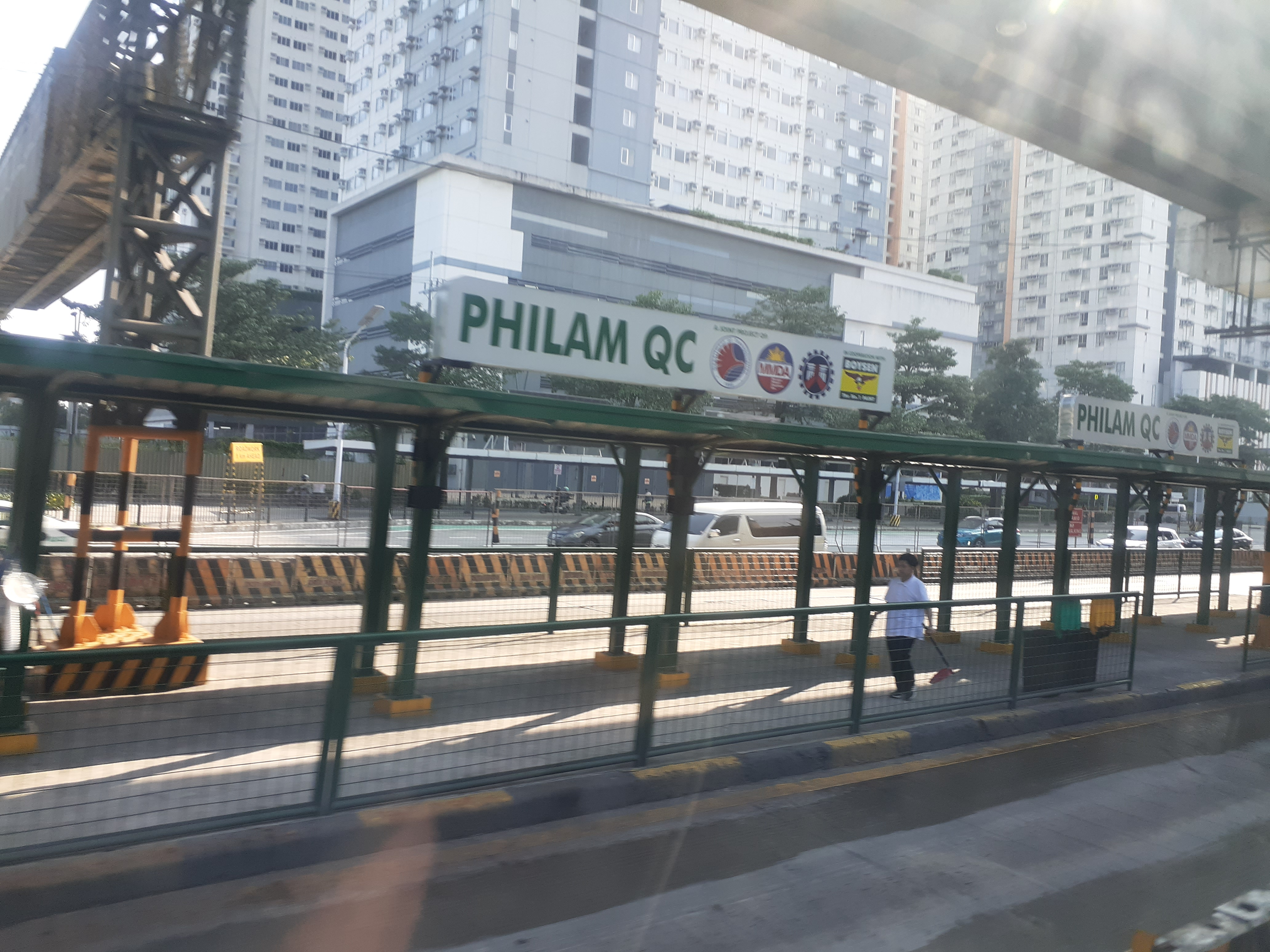
Philam QC

Kamuning

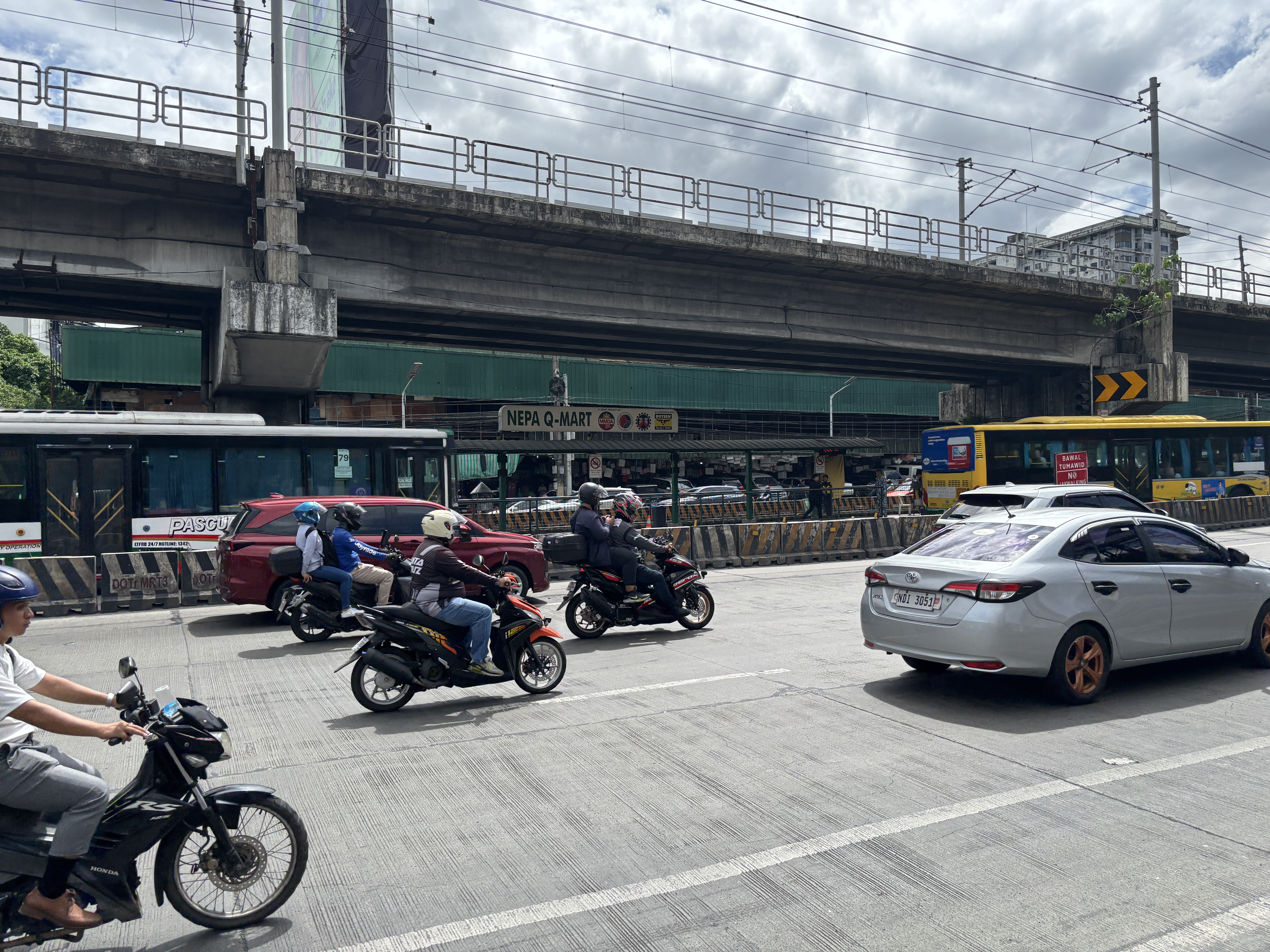
Nepa Q-Mart

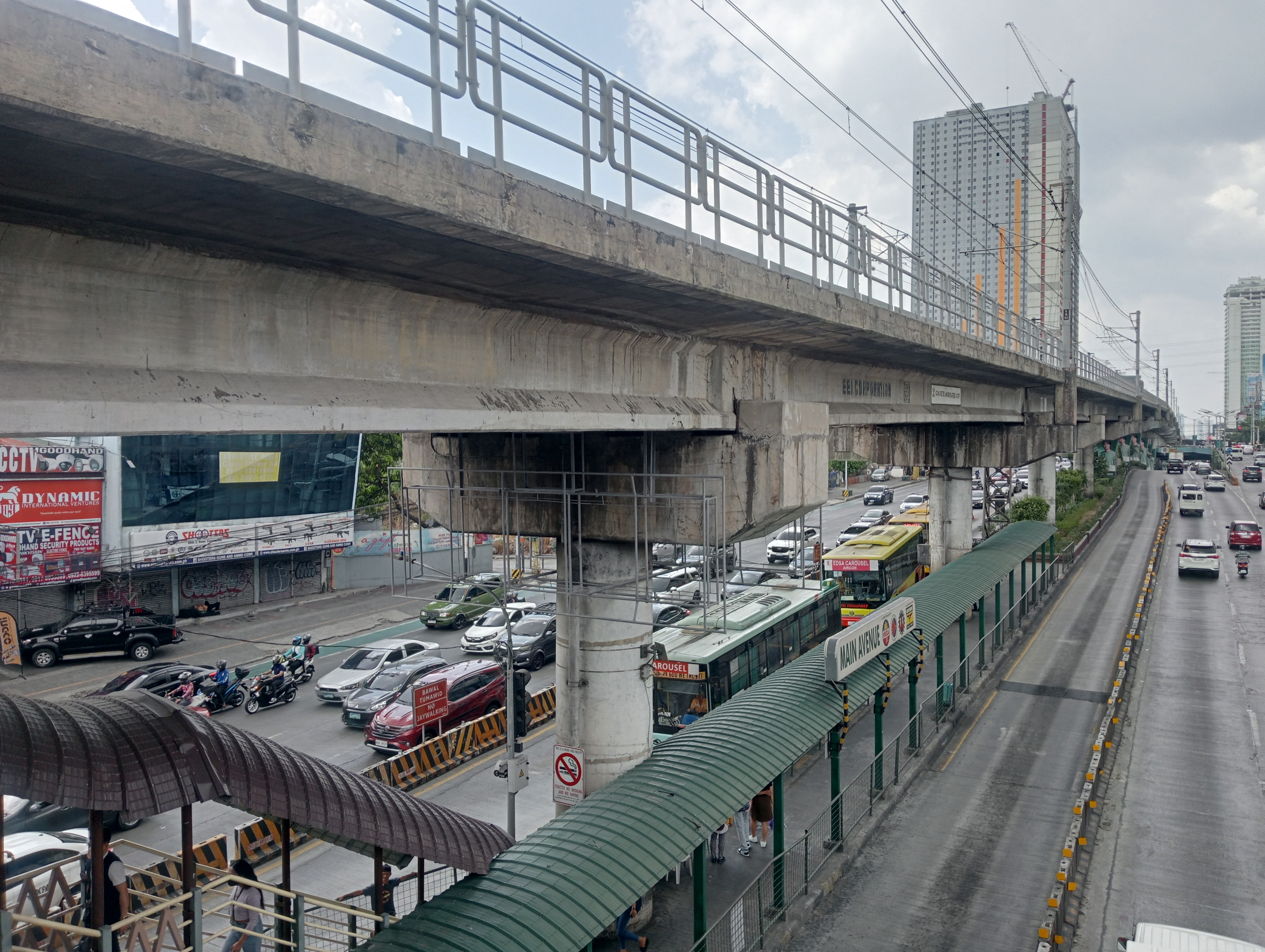
Main Avenue

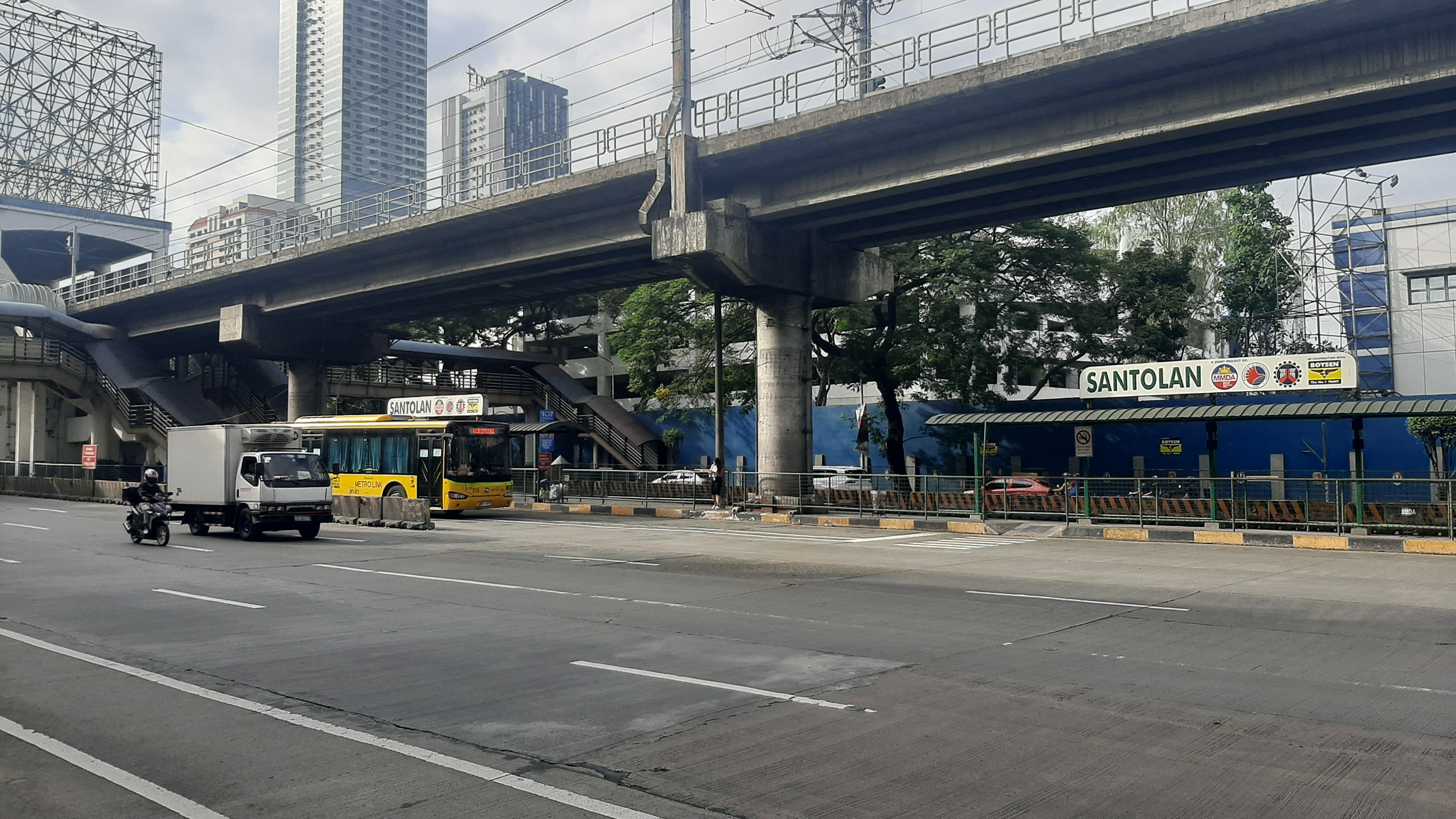
Santolan

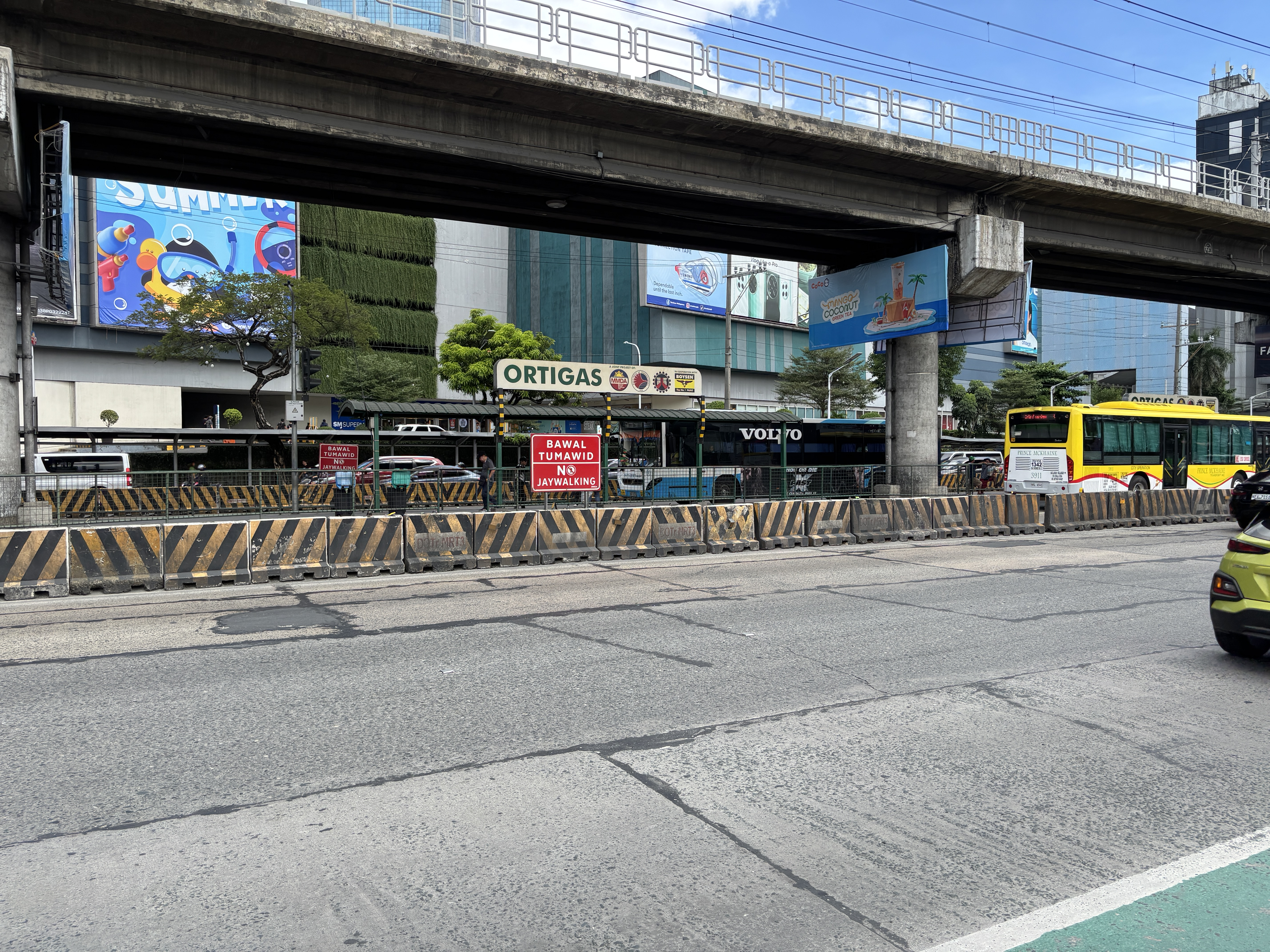
Ortigas

Guadalupe

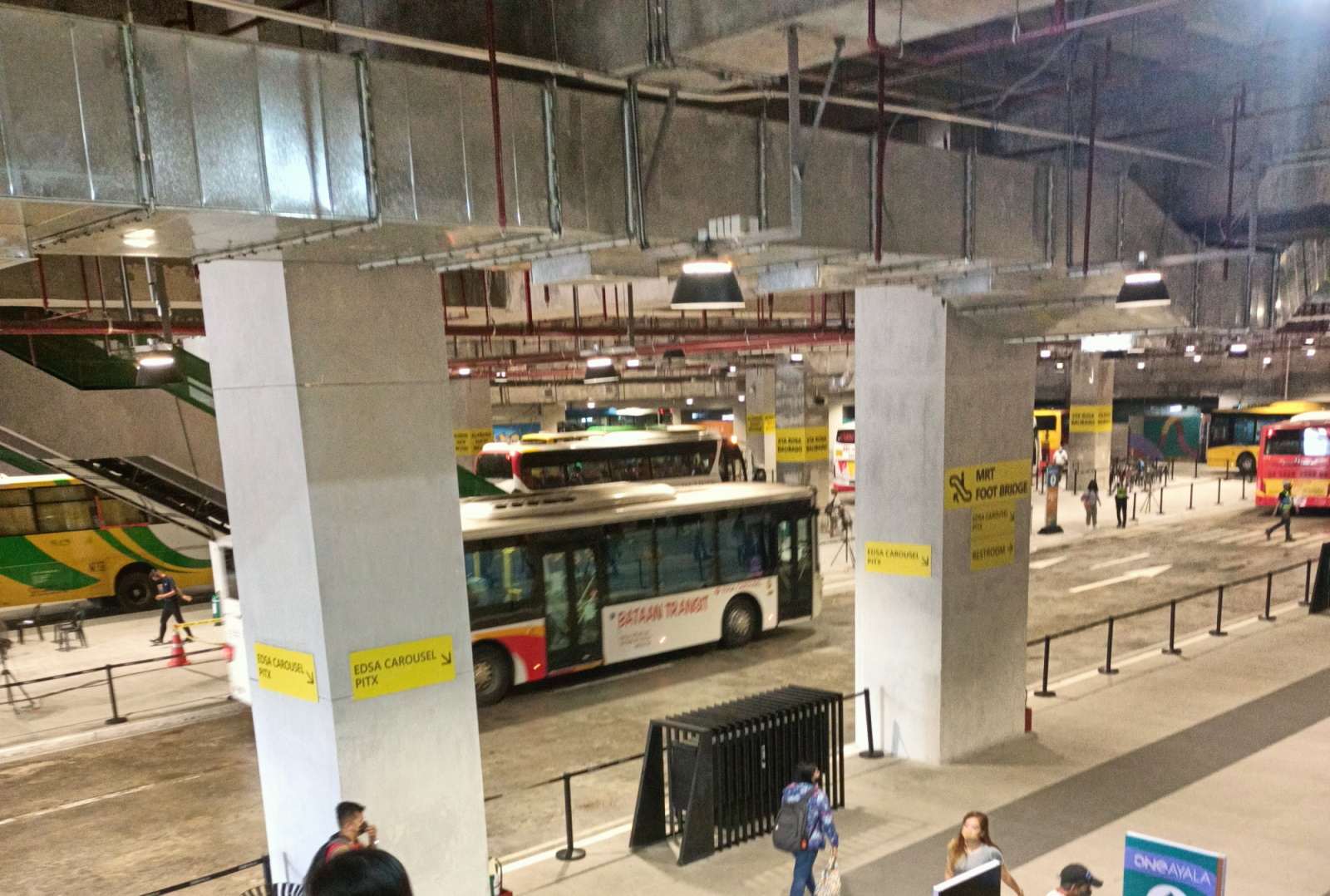
One Ayala

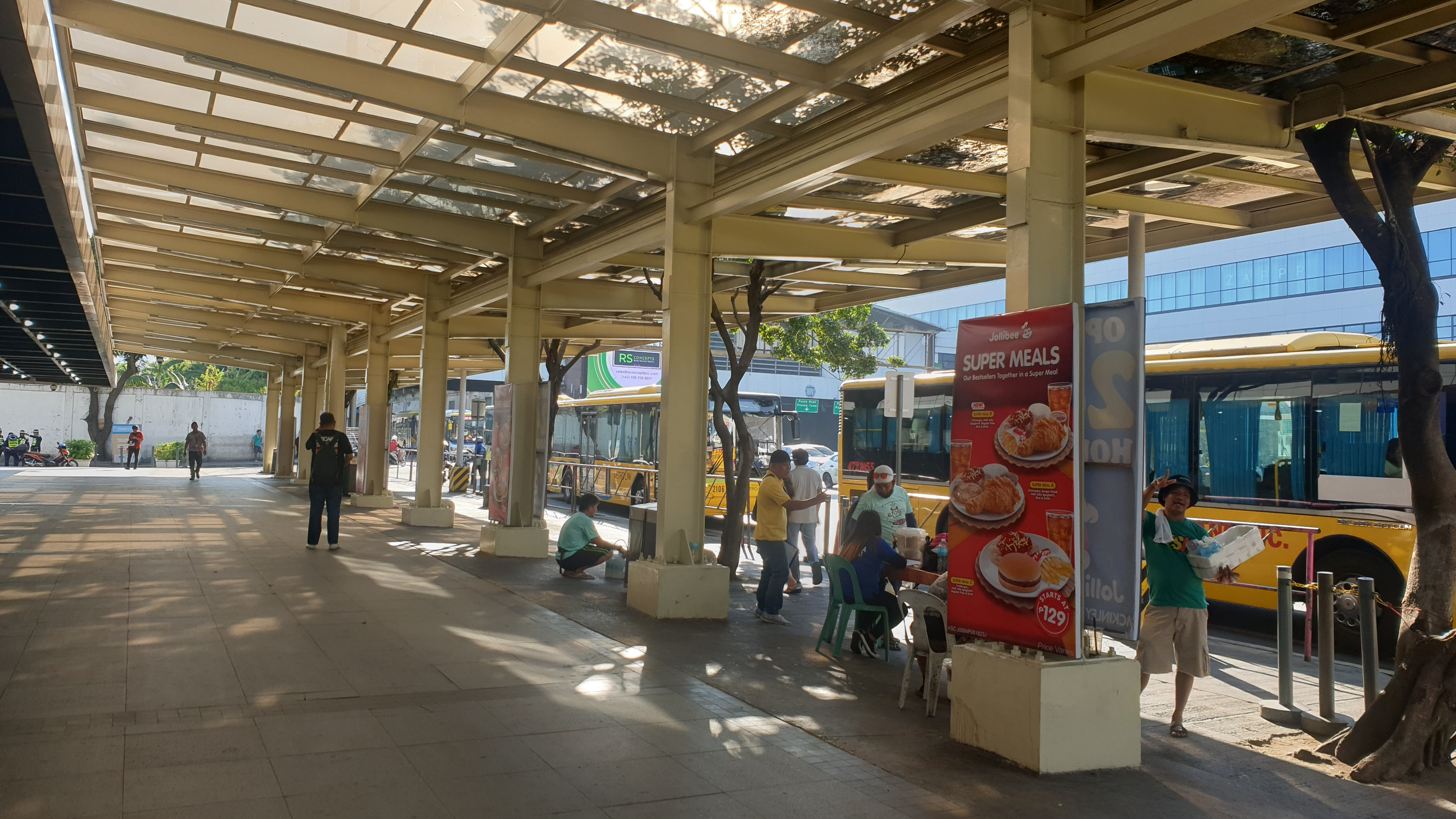
Ayala, beside McKinley Exchange Corporate Center

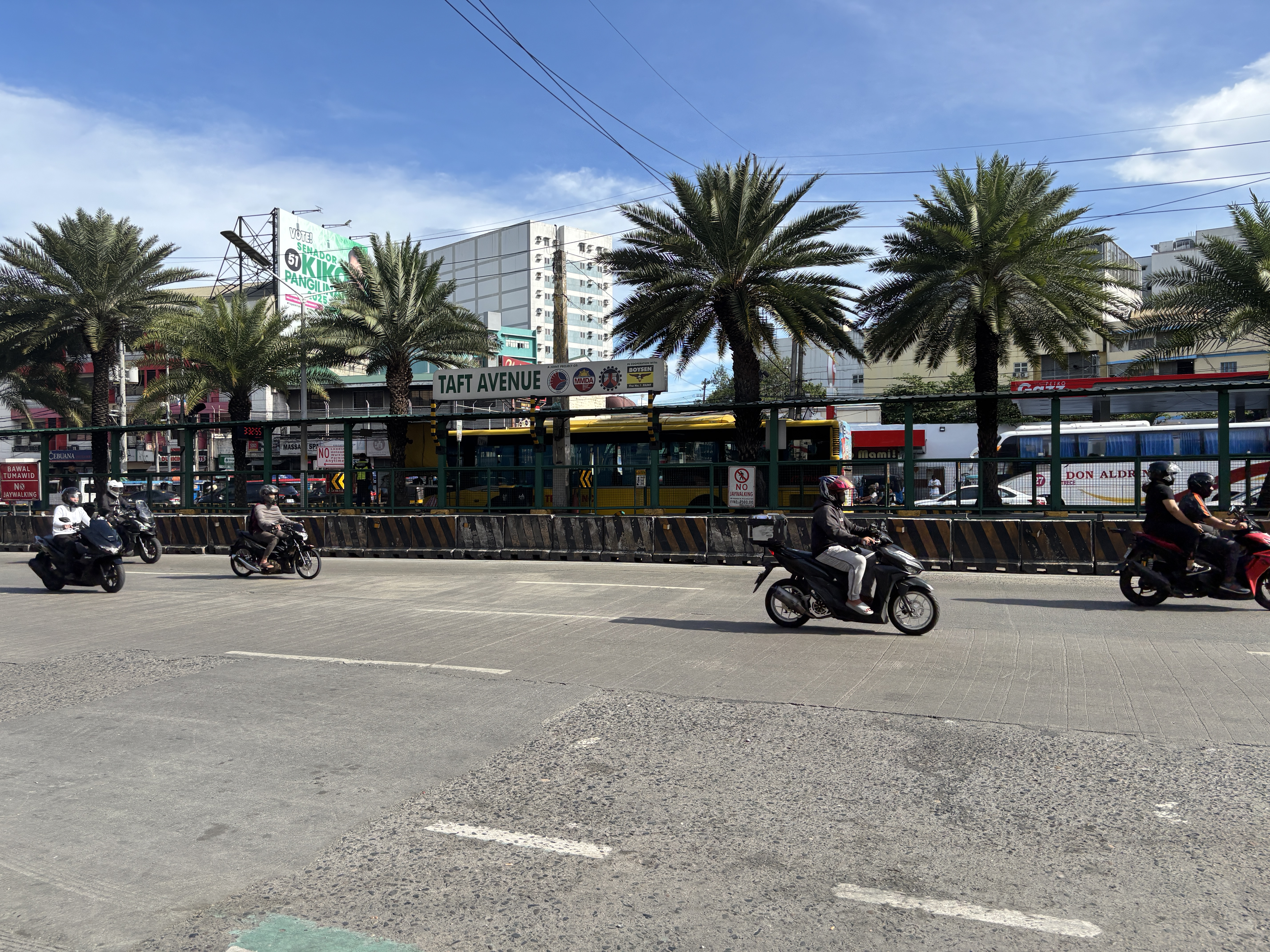
Taft Avenue

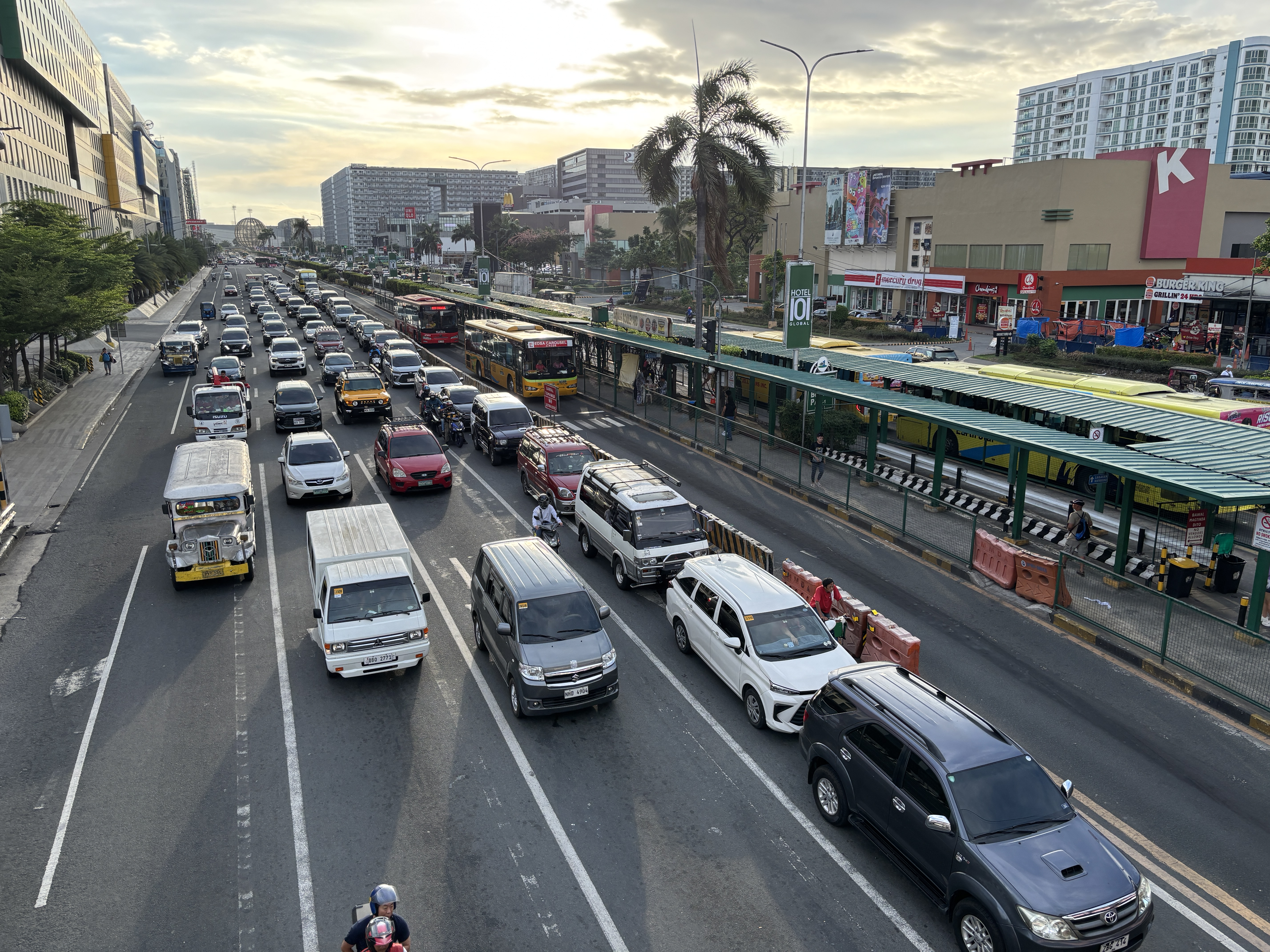
Roxas Boulevard

=== Stop layout ===
The line utilizes existing pedestrian footbridges along EDSA by constructing additional stairways to the center island of EDSA. It also uses some stations of the MRT Line 3 and LRT Line 1 by making use of the train stations' emergency exit stairways. Some bus stops, such as the ones at Ayala (northbound), SM Mall of Asia, and Macapagal Boulevard, still use the existing stops on the curbside, while the southbound Ayala bus stop is located inside One Ayala. Unlike those along EDSA, stops along Macapagal Boulevard are unmarked.

List of future stops
| Name | Type | Connections | Status | Location |
|---|---|---|---|---|
| Cubao; Monte de Piedad | Median | Manila MRT: Araneta Center–Cubao; Manila LRT: Araneta Center–Cubao | Ongoing | Quezon City |
| Connecticut | Unknown | none | Planned | San Juan |
| Greenfields | Unknown | Manila MRT: Shaw Boulevard | Planned | Mandaluyong |
| Estrella | Unknown | none | Planned | Makati |
| Magallanes | Median | Manila MRT: Magallanes | Ongoing | Makati |
Stops, stations and transit systems in italics are either under construction or proposed.

== Future ==
=== Proposed privatization and resumption of free rides ===
Due to the increasing number of passengers as restrictions are slowly being relaxed, volumes of passengers began to increase as well. In the wake of increasing inflation and world market movements affecting currency values, free rides for the EDSA Carousel were announced for the remaining months of then-President Rodrigo Duterte's term. Upon Bongbong Marcos's assumption of the presidency, free rides were extended until the end of 2022, in spite of budgetary concerns. However, the free rides introduced problems of ridership capacity and the amount of buses available to serve passengers during rush hours.

Proposals to privatize the operations of the EDSA Carousel to further improve its services were explored. Transportation secretary Jaime Bautista in 2022 stated that the DOTr is open to such proposals, adding these must be "explored expeditiously."

In 2025, Bautista stated that the DOTr aims to turn over the operations and maintenance of the EDSA Busway and EDSA Carousel to a private operator by 2026, with a feasibility study being completed within the next few months.

On February 25, 2025, a day after riding the EDSA Carousel from Ortigas to Monumento, then-newly appointed Transportation Secretary Vince Dizon noted several needed solutions and improvements for the operations of the EDSA Carousel. He emphasized the need for a stricter dispatch system along Monumento and PITX bus stations to ensure timeliness and prevent bus congestion. Dizon also highlighted the lack of wayfinding in stations connected to the MRT-3, faulty timers in some stations, unsuitable railing stops, and broken elevators.

Because of these planned upgrades, the proposals to privatize the EDSA Carousel were postponed to 2026 or 2027 to allow for the construction of the new concourses in all existing stations as part of the long-term proposals to modernize the system.

=== EDSA Busway concourses ===
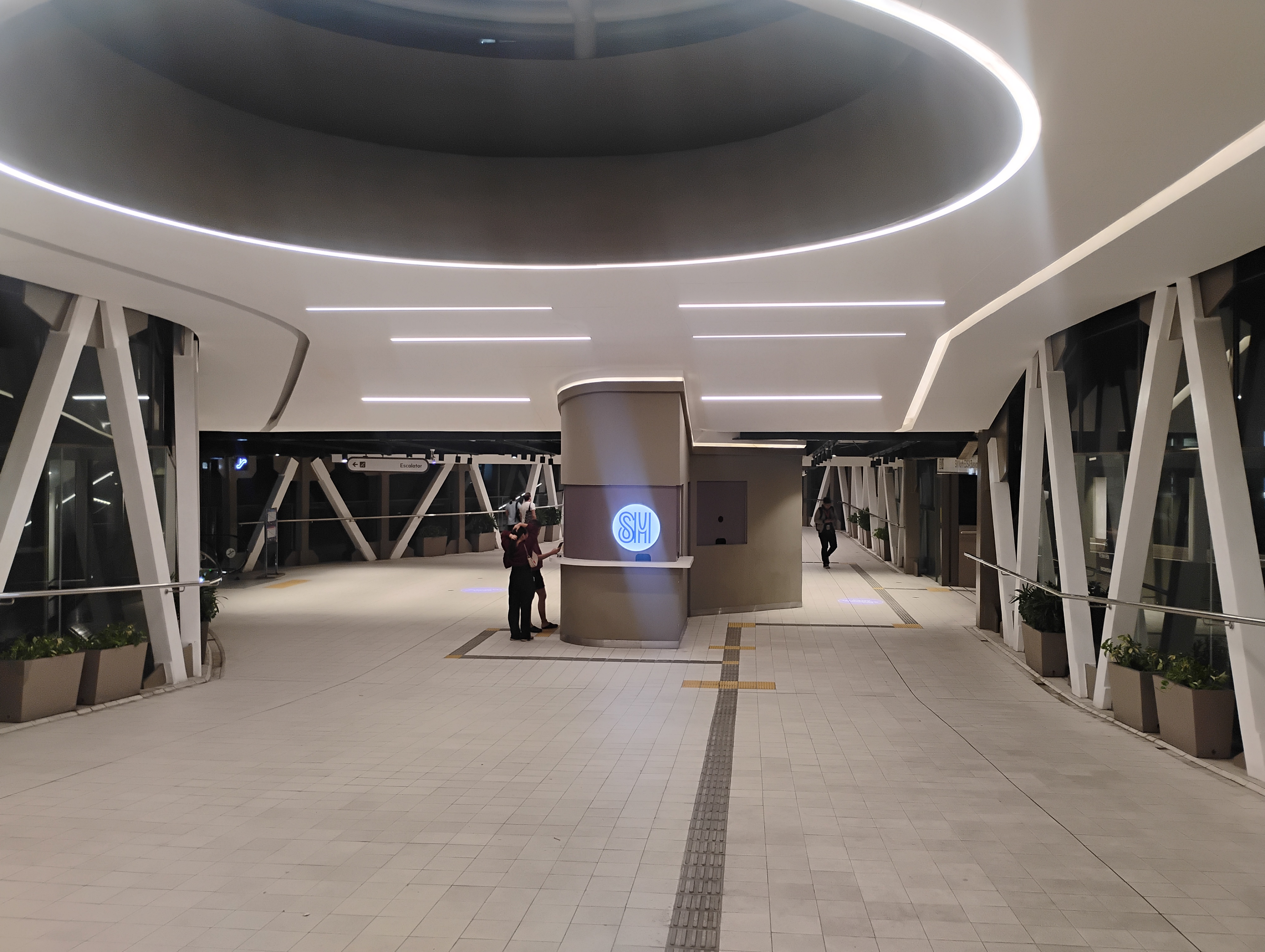
The SM North EDSA busway station features the busway's first concourse.

On November 16, 2020, the Department of Transportation (DOTr) signed an agreement with SM Prime Holdings, DM Wenceslao and Associates Inc., and Double Dragon Properties Corp. for the construction of EDSA busway bridges. The bridges will be shouldered by the three companies, seeking to provide safer, convenient, and PWD-friendly walkways for the riding public using the EDSA Carousel stops, and for pedestrians crossing EDSA. The pedestrian bridges were conceptualized with concourses, concierge, ticketing booths, and turnstiles for the automated fare collection system. Ramps and elevators would also be available to provide accessibility for PWDs, senior citizens, and pregnant passengers. The structures will be strategically located at the SM Mall of Asia, SM North EDSA, SM Megamall, Macapagal Boulevard in ASEANA City and the corner of EDSA and Macapagal Boulevard. The groundbreaking ceremony for the EDSA Busway Concourse Project was held on May 18, 2021. It was expected to be completed in March 2022.

On February 15, 2024, SM Prime and Transportation secretary Jaime Bautista started the construction of the first busway concourse of the Busway route, located along SM North EDSA with a groundbreaking ceremony. It opened on March 15, 2025.

As of November 2, 2026, only the SM North EDSA and SM Megamall concourses, although without the turnstiles for the automated fare collection system, are open to the public.

On February 25, 2025, during his first press conference in office as the then-new Secretary of Transportation, Secretary Vince Dizon noted that the DOTr will model and replicate the implementation of the busway station concourses made in partnership SM Prime along SM North EDSA and the upcoming Ortigas Busway concourse through the construction of similar busway concourses. The bidding of the construction of additional concourses in all existing busway stations in May 2025, while the construction of the concourses are aimed to begin within the second half of 2025 and is aimed to be completed within 2026 to 2027.

=== Additional busway stops ===
On June 20, 2022, the DOTr announced an additional 11 more stops would be added to the EDSA Carousel, which would bring the total number of stops to 29. The Tramo, Taft Avenue, Roxas Boulevard, Kamuning and Philam (Ormoc) stops have since been completed.

In November 2025, the DOTr announced the opening of bidding for proposed median bus stops in Cubao, Magallanes, and PITX.

The proposed Connecticut, Greenfields, and Estrella stops still remain under consideration, as the location, funding, and feasibility studies are yet to be determined and conducted.

== Controversies ==
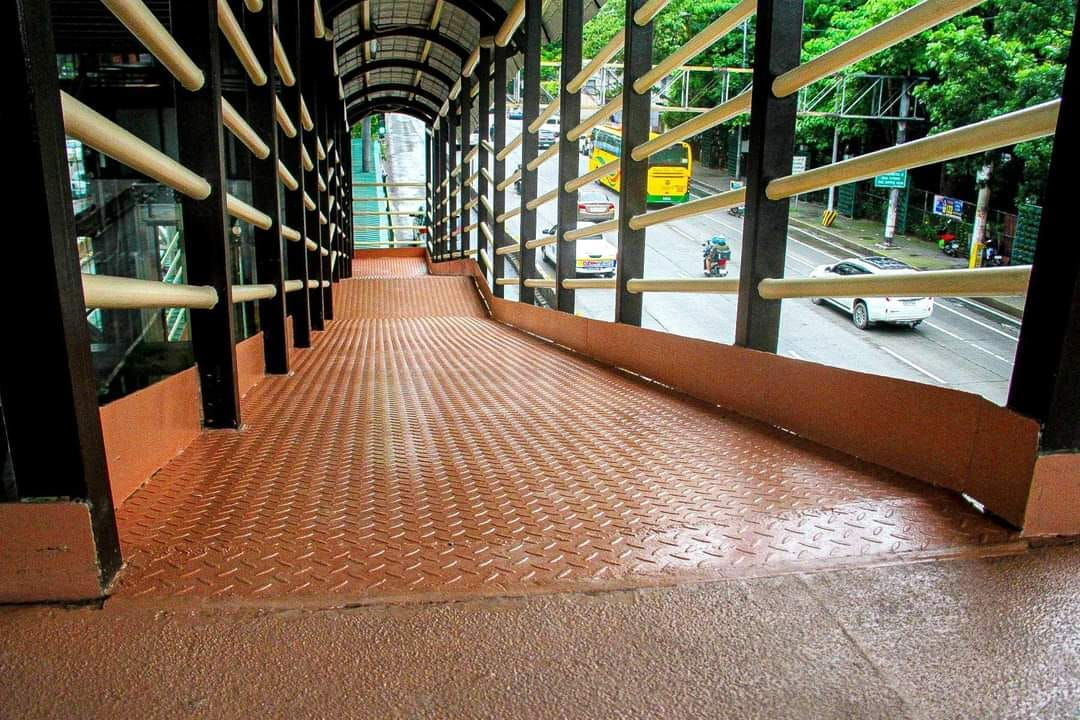
Wheelchair ramp at Philam QC bus stop, which became viral in July 2024 for its steepness

- On October 1, 2020, the "No Beep card, No entry" policy was implemented to minimize physical contact between commuters and public transport personnel to reduce their risk of getting COVID-19 and to allow for more seamless and faster transactions to trim down the queuing of passengers. The new policy has drawn flak from commuters due to the current price of the card and its immediate implementation. Within the first week of its implementation, the Department of Transportation (DOTr) suspended the mandatory use of Beep cards after AF Payments Incorporated refused the government's request to waive the ₱80.00 cost of Beep cards.
- When the bus stops from Monumento to North Avenue were opened, the U-turn slots were closed, causing heavy traffic at the said portion. U-turn slots were reopened after few months to ease traffic flow. In November 2021, traffic lights were installed at the U-turn slots to address concerns both of the bus accessibility and the traffic congestion it causes.
- On April 13, 2022, the EDSA Carousel failed to keep up with the influx of demand as a result of the LRT-2 and MRT-3 being closed for annual Holy Week maintenance from April 13 to 17. As a result, many commuters were stranded as queues overflowed onto roads, with some waiting past midnight or opting to walk home. The shortage of buses was attributed to slow service contracting subsidies and high gasoline prices. Skip buses were deployed, and some motorists offered rides to stranded commuters. However, intensified anti-colorum operations hindered rescue attempts. The next day, Transportation secretary Arthur Tugade issued a formal apology and promised to prevent such incidents in the future.
- The MMDA reported that newly installed glass elevators at the Balintawak and Guadalupe stops were found shattered by stone-throwers during their installation between April and June 2024. The elevator at Bagong Barrio was also found with its wiring pulled out. In response, the MMDA appealed to the public not to destroy the elevators and stated that the destroyed equipment was replaced by the contractor free of charge.
- On July 16, 2024, a photo of a steep ramp at the new Philam QC bus stop went viral for being unfriendly for people with disabilities (PWDs). The next day, GMA Integrated News reported that the ramp was 10 degrees steeper than the standard stipulated by the Accessibility Law (Batas Pambansa Blg. 344). A wheelchair user also found the ramp "too steep to use going up and too dangerous to use going down." The MMDA explained that the design was constrained by a height restriction under the MRT Line 3 and admitted it was "not perfect." They will assign personnel to assist PWDs using the ramp. On July 20, they announced the ramp's temporary closure for improvements.

=== Calls for opening and abolishment ===
On several occasions, there have been calls and proposals to either abolish the EDSA Carousel and the EDSA Busway or to open up the busway to private vehicles, with different desired outcomes:

- In July 2023, the Mega Manila Consortium requested the government to reinstate pre-pandemic city and provincial bus routes along EDSA, arguing that the rationalization of bus routes in Metro Manila had left many buses unused. The MMDA opposed the proposal, with MMDA chairperson Romando Artes emphasizing that the government has made significant financial investments in developing the system and that the EDSA Carousel was "very effective" at cutting down travel time.
- In August 2024, Leyte 4th district representative Richard Gomez opined on Facebook that the EDSA Busway should opened to regular traffic, arguing that "only a few buses use [it]". His statement drew backlash online, causing Gomez to delete the post but issue a follow-up statement the next day, defending his comments as his own personal opinion.
- In February 2025, DILG secretary Jonvic Remulla and MMDA chairperson Romando Artes floated the idea of phasing out the EDSA Busway and eliminating city buses from EDSA, citing that it would be "redundant" with the projected increase in the MRT-3's capacity. In addition to the idea, Artes also proposed converting the bus lane into a high-occupancy vehicle lane, while denying that his proposal was car-centric. The suggestion drew public outcry, causing the DOTr to issue a statement defending the importance of the EDSA Busway and affirming its commitment to improve the system. Days later, DOTr secretary Jaime Bautista announced that President Marcos, during a cabinet meeting, endorsed keeping the EDSA Busway. Furthermore, Bautista's successor, Vince Dizon, opposes the abolishment of the EDSA Busway.
- In January 2026, MMDA general manager Nicolas Torre proposed allowing "high-occupancy vehicles" with ten or more passengers to use the EDSA Busway. The DOTr opposed the proposal, with Transportation secretary Giovanni Z. Lopez stating that opening the busway to private vehicles could slow down bus operations and undermine the lane's purpose of prioritizing mass transit. Days later, Malacañang supported the DOTr's position and clarified that Torre's proposal reflected his personal opinion rather than an official MMDA proposal. In a press conference, MMDA chairperson Romando Artes stated that Torre's idea needs further study and discussion, citing logistical issues with implementation and compliance, as well as reservations from the LTFRB.
- In November 2026, amid Phase 2 of the EDSA Rehabilitation Project, the EDSA Busway was expanded to include one adjacent lane for private vehicles to temporarily use between Nepa Q-Mart and Boni Avenue while road resurfacing works were underway. The temporary arrangement is expected to last approximately two weeks, after which the busway would be restored. Due to a miscommunication that the entire busway would no longer be exclusive, the Department of Public Works and Highways (DPWH) clarified on November 3 that the inner lane remains exclusive to authorized vehicles while private vehicles would only be permitted on the added lane.

== Incidents and accidents ==
=== Road crashes ===
In a span of two years since the implementation of the EDSA Busway and the start of EDSA Carousel operations, multiple road crashes have been recorded within and outside of the EDSA Busway.

- Multiple instances of motor vehicles crashing into the concrete barriers of the EDSA Busway were recorded since the EDSA Carousel's operations started. According to MMDA traffic czar Edison Nebrija, most of the drivers who crashed their vehicles against the barriers were speeding, drunk, or asleep behind the wheel. Some of the concrete barriers have already been replaced with steel bollards following a series of accidents.
- Several road-related deaths and injuries have also been reported on the EDSA Busway itself due to collisions between buses and other legal and illegal vehicles, as well as jaywalking incidents.

In light of this, the Move As One Coalition, a non-government transport advocacy organization, urged the government to implement at-grade crosswalks and speed limits, widen the EDSA Busway lanes, use safer barriers and BRT-compatible buses, and conduct proper training for bus drivers.

=== Trespassing of unauthorized vehicles ===
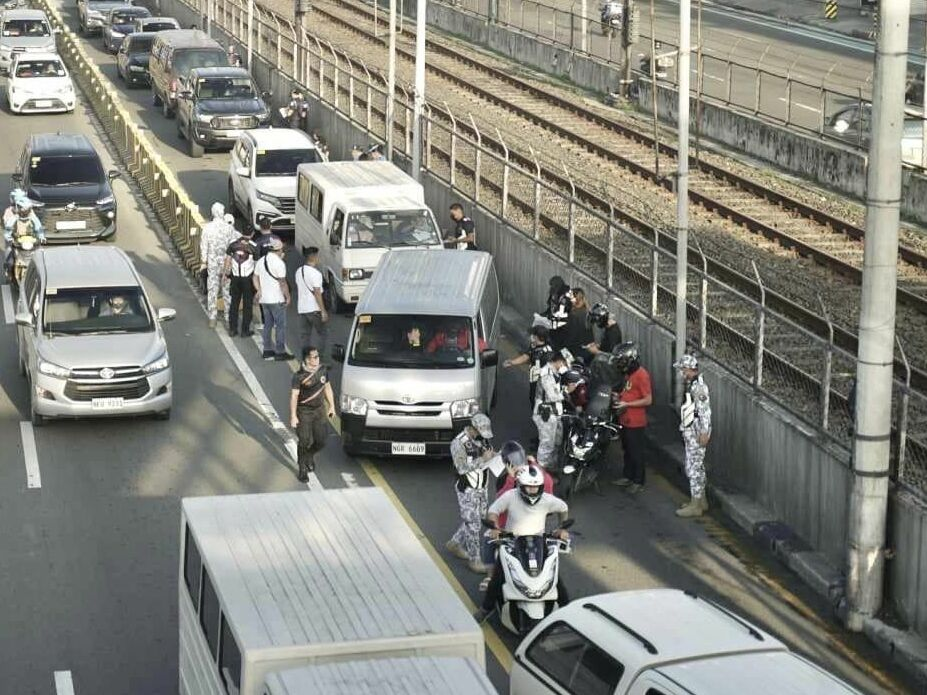
EDSA Busway violators being apprehended by InterAgency Council on Traffic (IACT) enforcers in Pasay.

Due to the traffic that may affect operations, aside from EDSA Carousel buses and other authorized city buses, ambulances, firetrucks, and military vehicles responding to emergencies (but not returning to base), and vehicles of the top five government officials (President, Vice President, Senate President, House Speaker, and Chief Justice) are the only allowed vehicles on the EDSA Busway.

Multiple incidents of private and non-emergency government motor vehicles illegally using the EDSA Busway have been recorded, causing disruptions to EDSA Carousel operations.

- During the first month of operations in 2020, the MMDA reported that over 900 violators were apprehended and ticketed, with half of them being government personnel.
- On July 20, 2023, photos of a sting operation conducted by the Inter-Agency Council on Traffic enforcers went viral online as over 150 motorists were apprehended and ticketed for illegally using the EDSA Busway in Pasay. The DOTr and MMDA issued a reminder to motorists to respect the exclusivity of the EDSA Busway.
- According to the MMDA, some motorists were taking advantage of the ₱1,000 fine for trespassing on the busway by offenders who could afford regularly paying it. As a result, the MMDA issued MMDA Regulation 23-002, increasing fines for both public and private vehicles.
- On April 17, 2026, a Philippine National Police (PNP) Toyota Coaster collided with an EDSA Carousel bus while entering the busway near Main Avenue. According to passengers, the PNP driver failed to assist stranded passengers following the incident, while the bus driver stated that the PNP driver demanded his driver's license and attempted to hold him liable for damages. An investigation was launched by the Napolcom, and the Napocolm announced in a press briefing on April 20 that both the driver and his immediate supervisor have been relieved from their posts. The driver also apologized for his actions and admitted liability in the incident.
- On August 23, 2026, the LTO apprehended a private SUV used by MMDA general manager Nicolas Torre after it was used on the busway while bearing MMDA markings and a red government plate registered to a different MMDA vehicle. At a scheduled hearing on September 4, Torre stated that the vehicle was being used for official inspections and acknowledged that the plate number had been copied from an MMDA truck. He paid a total of ₱14,000 in fines for unauthorized use of the busway, plate tampering, and illegal markings and modifications before the hearing. Torre said that he had purchased the SUV, which he described as an armored vehicle, for ₱3.5 million from a church through Facebook Marketplace and used it for security purposes due to alleged threats against him.

==== Enforcement and penalties ====
Enforcement of the busway was previously enforced under MMDA Regulation No. 20-002, which was signed on July 28, 2020. Public and private motor vehicle drivers that violated the regulation were fined ₱1,000 for each offense. However, under MMDA Regulation No. 23-002 ratified on November 6, 2023, penalties were stricter after numerous violations, especially from people who can easily pay the ₱1,000 fine.

As of November 13, 2023, fines for private and unauthorized public vehicles using the EDSA Busway are as follows:

- First offense: ₱5,000
- Second offense: ₱10,000 with a one-month suspension of driver's license and mandatory road safety seminar
- Third offense: ₱20,000 with a one-year suspension of driver's license
- Fourth offense: ₱30,000 with a recommendation to the Land Transportation Office for the revocation of driver's license

Any driver who attempts to flee from officers automatically incurs a third offense.

== See also ==
- List of bus routes in Metro Manila
- Cebu Bus Rapid Transit System
- Davao Public Transport Modernization Project
