= V. Luna General Hospital =

Military unit and government hospital

Coordinates: 14°38′05″N 121°03′09″E

AFP Health Service Command
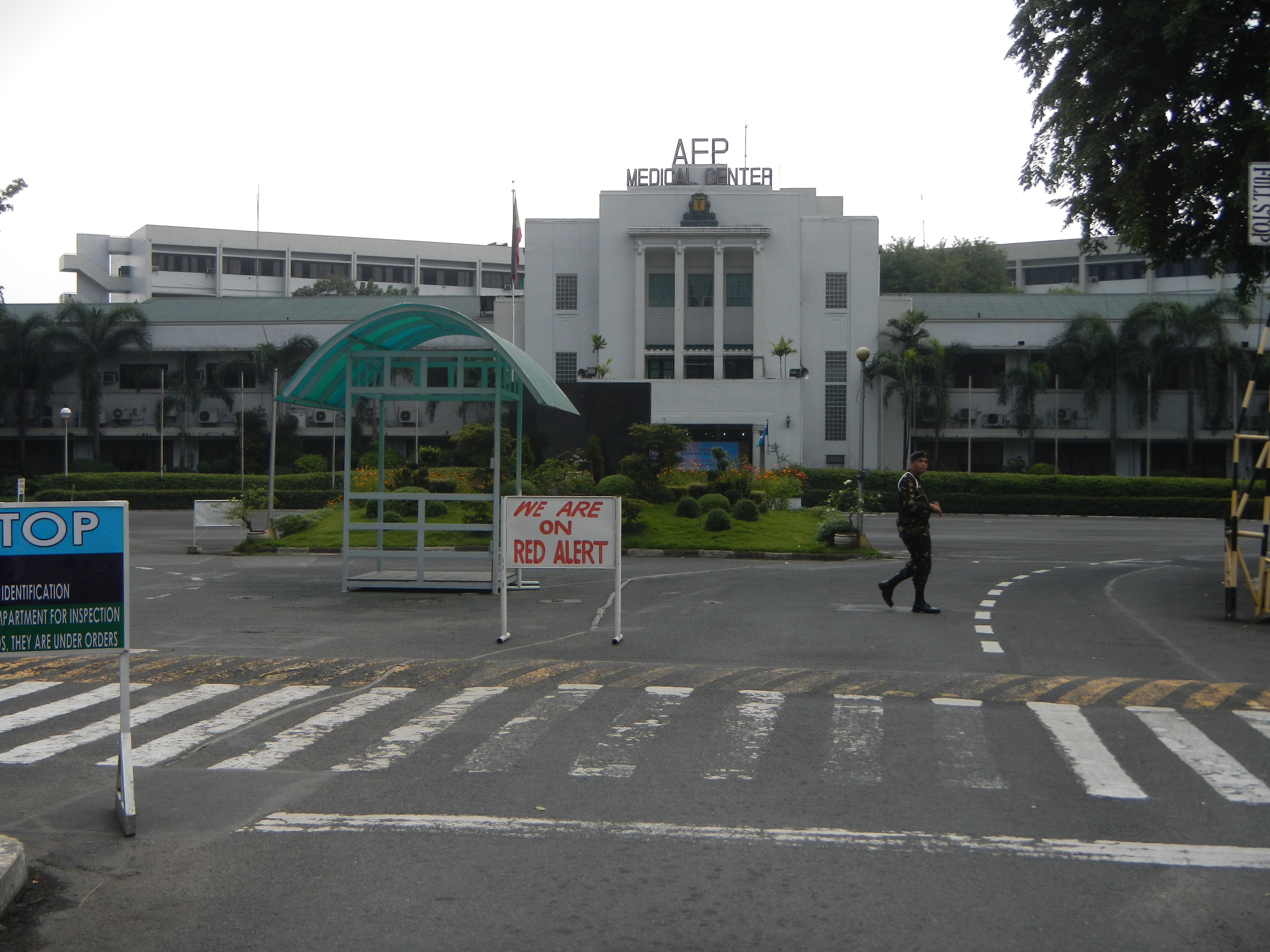
- Facade of the AFP Medical Center
- Active: 1937–3 September 1946 (1st Army General Hospital); September 3, 1946–present (AFP Medical Center)
- Country: Philippines
- Branch: Armed Forces of the Philippines
- Type: Combat Support Hospital
- Role: Military Health and Well-being
- Size: 1000+ (military personnel and civilian human resources)
- Part of: Armed Forces of the Philippines
- Garrison/HQ: Camp Colonel Victoriano K. Luna, V. Luna Avenue, Pinyahan, Quezon City
- Nickname: AFPHSC
- Anniversaries: September 3
- Decorations: Philippine Republic Presidential Unit Citation Badge

Commanders
- Current commander: Bgen Erickson L Gob MC (GSC)
- Notable commanders: Colonel Victoriano K Luna MC (GSC) PA; B.Gen. Normando T. Santa Ana, Jr. AFP

Insignia
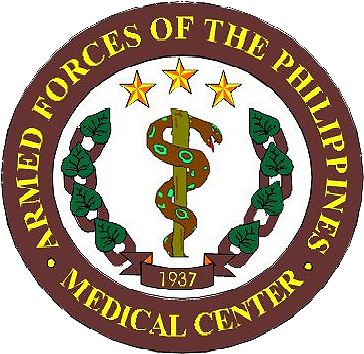
- Unit Seal of the AFP Medical Center

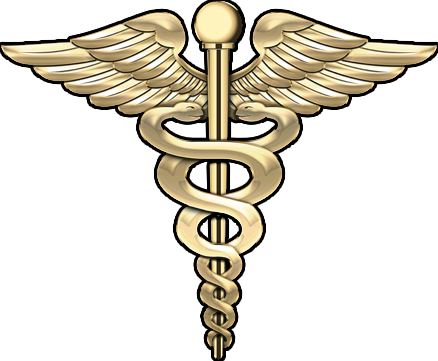
- AFP Medical Corps Branch Insignia

The Victoriano Luna General Hospital (or simply V. Luna General Hospital), also known as Armed Forces of the Philippines Medical Center (AFP General Hospital), is one of the Armed Forces of the Philippines' Wide Support Units tasked to provide medical care to military personnel and civilian human resources of the AFP, which includes their immediate dependents. It also refers to the healthcare facility complex that is occupied by the unit along V. Luna Avenue in Pinyahan, Quezon City.

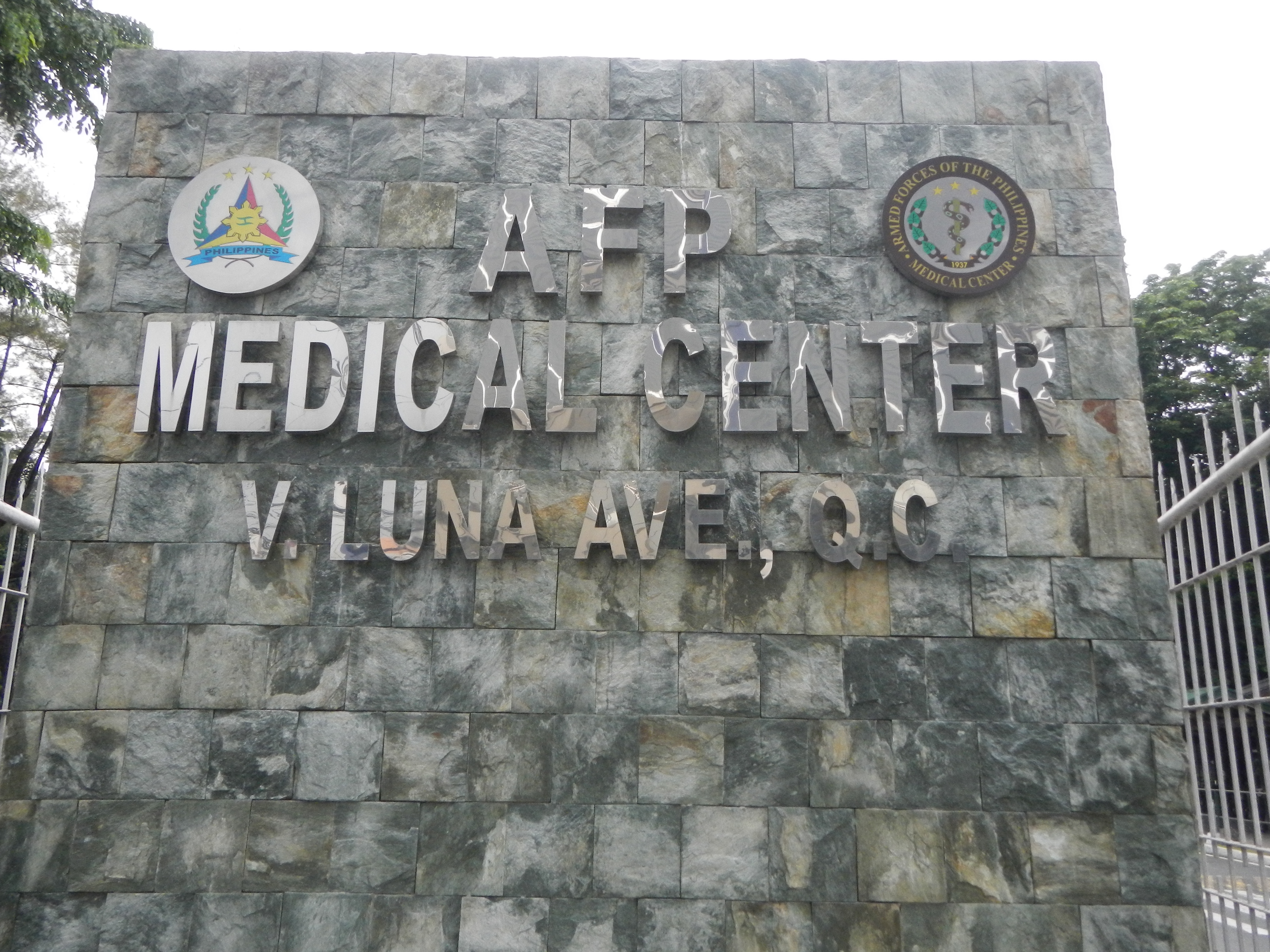
Gate

== History ==
The V. Luna General Hospital was named after Col. Victoriano Luna who was then Chief of the Medical Service and Adviser to the Chief of Staff. He came up with the idea in 1935 of putting up an Army Station Hospital to address the health service needs of a growing army.

By 1937, Army Engineers started the design conceptualization and construction of Luna's dream. On September 3, 1946, pursuant to Headquarters Philippine Army (HPA) GO Nr 512, the 1st Philippine Army General Hospital was named "Colonel Victoriano Luna General Hospital" in honor Luna who conceptualized the medical center.

== Units ==
The units under the AFPHSC control are as follows:

- Headquarters & Headquarters Service Support Group
- Victoriano Luna Medical Center
- Health Service Education and Training Center
- Public Health Service Center
- Dental Service Center
- Veterinary Service Center
