= Pinyahan =

Barangay in Quezon City, Metro Manila, Philippines

- Barangay
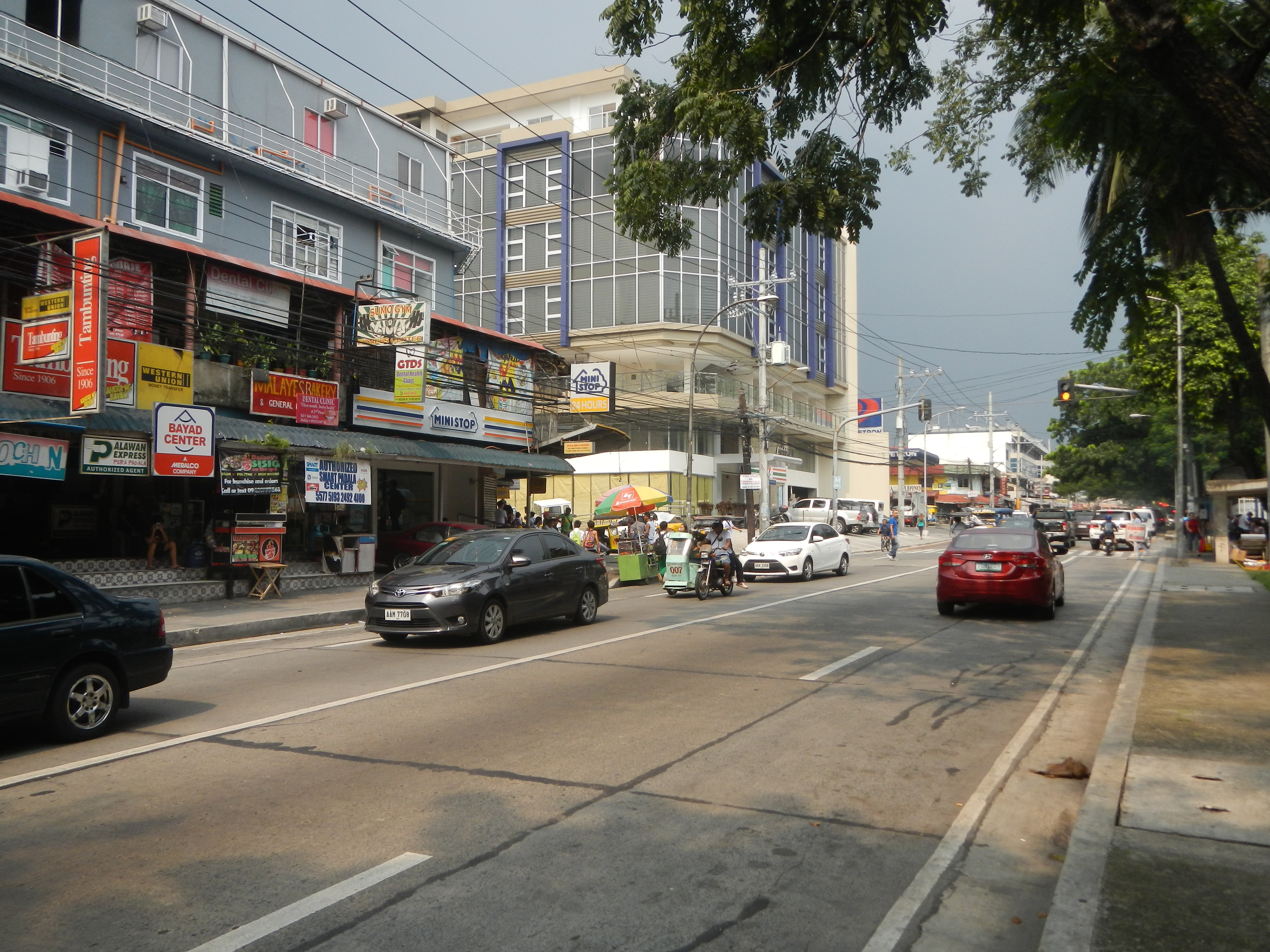
- V. Luna Avenue

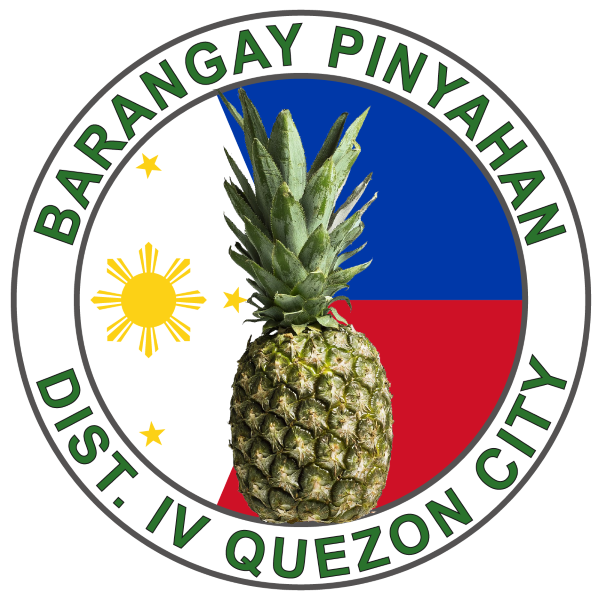
- Seal
- Nickname: Piñahan
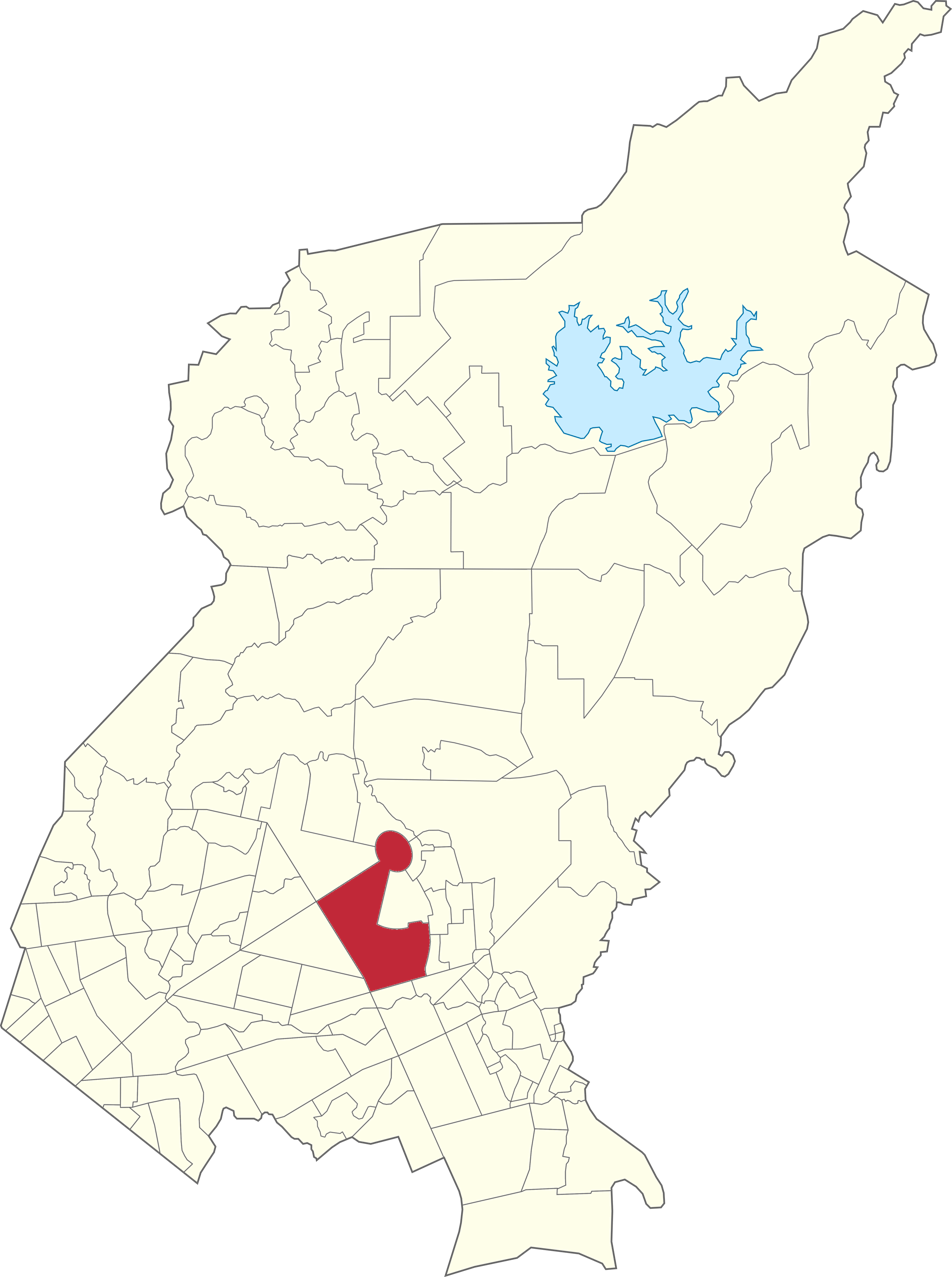
- Map of Quezon City showing Barangay Pinyahan

- Location of Barangay Pinyahan within Metro Manila
- Coordinates: 14°38′24″N 121°2′46″E
- Country: Philippines
- Region: National Capital Region
- City: Quezon City
- District: 4th District of Quezon City
- Established: June 25, 1975

Government
  - Type: Barangay
  - Barangay Captain: Ricardo Arteta Villaflor

Population (2010)
  - Total: 28,129
- Time zone: UTC+8 (PST)
- Postal Code: 1100
- Area code: 2

Pinyahan, sometimes spelled Piñahan, is a barangay of Quezon City, the Philippines.

== Etymology ==
Pinyahan means "a place where pineapple is grown" in Tagalog. Prior to its subdivision by the People's Homesite and Housing Corporation, the land which occupies present-day Pinyahan was a popular place for cultivating pineapples since the 1930s, thus the name of the barangay.

== History ==
Barangay Pinyahan was previously part of Central District Diliman. Central District Diliman was divided into two separate entities, namely Barangay Central and Pinyahan.

== Health ==
Several hospitals are based in Pinyahan including Lung Center of the Philippines, National Kidney and Transplant Institute (NKTI), Urology Center of the Philippines and the Armed Forces of the Philippines Medical Center along V. Luna Avenue.

== Education ==
Pinyahan Elementary School and Flora A. Ylagan High School are public schools based in Pinyahan. The AFP Medical Service School, is located within the Armed Forces of the Philippines Medical Center.

== Culture ==
The barangay celebrates its fiesta every May 15. The barangay patron saint is San Isidro Labrador.

== Law ==
The barangay is also the main mailing address of the Free Legal Assistance Group (FLAG), which is the largest and most prestigious human rights legal network in the country.
