= McKinley =

McKinley may refer to:

== People ==
- McKinley (name), a page for people with the surname and given name "McKinley"
  - William McKinley, 25th president of the United States.

== Places ==
=== Philippines ===
- Fort William McKinley (now Fort Bonifacio) in Metro Manila
- McKinley Road, a major thoroughfare in Metro Manila

=== United States ===
- Mount McKinley (also known as Denali), the highest mountain peak in North America, in Alaska
- McKinley, Alabama
- McKinley, Indiana
- McKinley, Michigan
- McKinley, Elk County, Pennsylvania
- McKinley, Montgomery County, Pennsylvania
- McKinley County, New Mexico
- McKinley Township, Emmet County, Michigan
- McKinley Township, Huron County, Michigan
- McKinley, Minnesota (disambiguation) (multiple)
- McKinley, Oregon
- McKinley, Wisconsin (disambiguation) (multiple)

== Other uses ==
- Itanium 2, codenamed McKinley, an Intel microprocessor
- McKinley, a sporting goods brand produced by Intersport

== See also ==
- MacKinley
- McKinlay
- MacKinlay
