= W Global Center =

Building in Taguig, Philippines

Coordinates: 14°33′04″N 121°03′07″E

The W Global Center is a 7-storey building located at Bonifacio Global City. It was built in 2012 and is classified as a Class A building. It is the second project of the W Group and is a joint venture of the Wee family and Global Restaurant Concepts Inc. (GRCI). The W Global Center has a total office and commercial space area of 5,600 square meters with a typical floor area of 1,870 square meters. The mezzanine and ground floor consists of retail and dining options. It has recognised startups such as PawnHero that offer affordable credit to the unbanked.

== Location ==
W Global Center is located at the corner of 9th Avenue and 30th Street in Bonifacio Global City, Taguig. It is in close proximity to Bonifacio High Street, Serendra, and Market! Market!.
