= McKinley Exchange Corporate Center =

Office building and transport terminal in Makati, Philippines

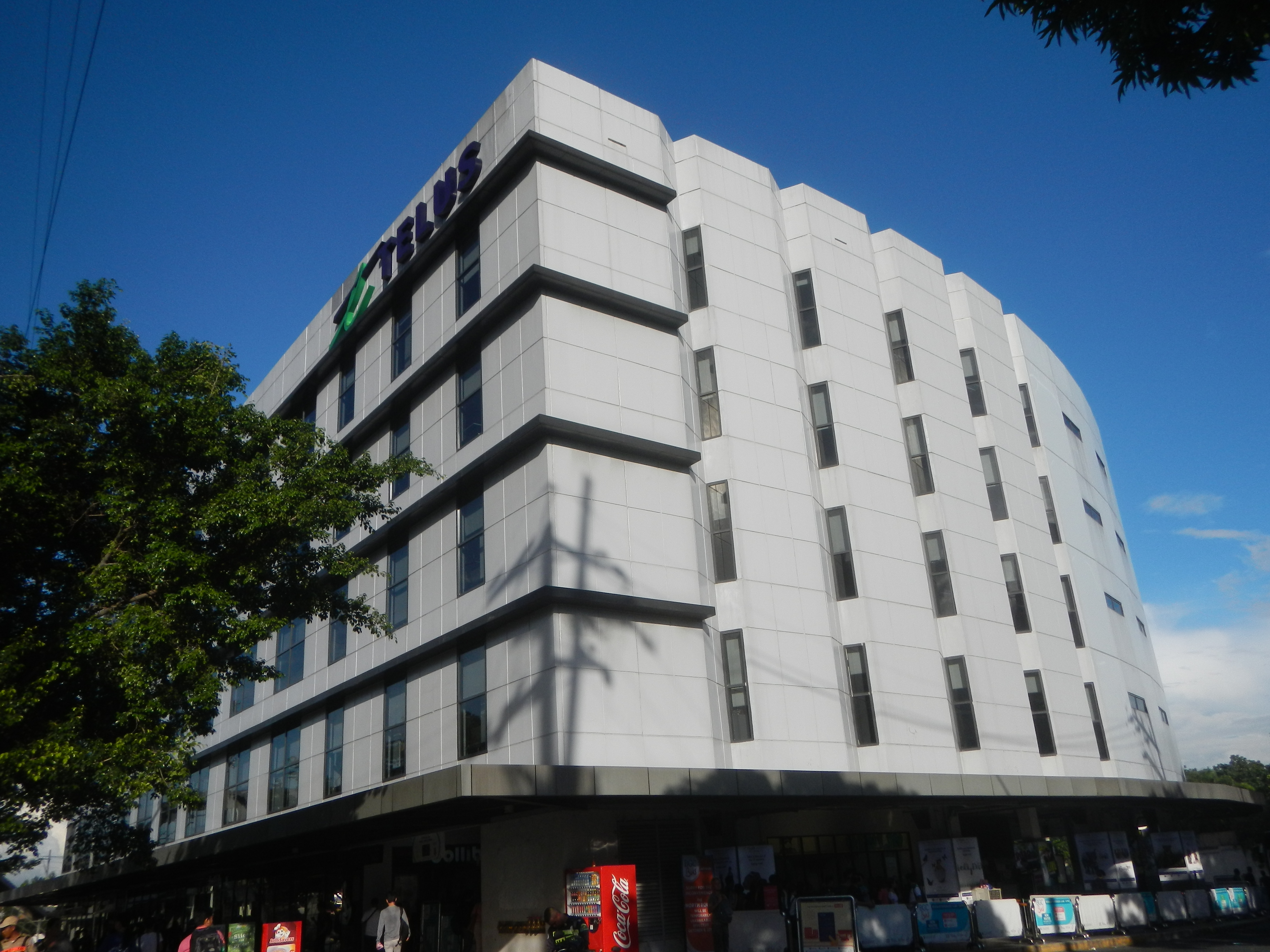
- McKinley Exchange Corporate Center in 2017

General information
- Location: McKinley Road corner EDSA; Makati, Metro Manila; Philippines
- Coordinates: 14°32′58″N 121°01′46″E
- System: Office building and transport terminal
- Owner: Ayala Land, Inc.
- Bus routes: EX01 L01 N01 NR17 NR01 W01 WR01 WR18
- Bus stands: 3
- Bus operators: Bonifacio Transport Corporation
- Connections: Ayala; 1 Ayala Bus Routes: 10 11 12 17 31 38 40 42 45 46 59 One Ayala; 62 63 EDSA-Ayala; Jeepneys, P2P Buses, Taxis (via One Ayala)

Construction
- Parking: 163 slots
- Accessible: yes

History
- Opened: 2014; 12 years ago
Location

McKinley Exchange Corporate Center is a 5-story commercial building, part of a mixed-use complex developed by Ayala Land Inc. as part of the ₱65 billion redevelopment and rebranding of the city of Makati. Opened in 2014, it is located along McKinley Road corner EDSA in Barangay Dasmariñas and was slated to become the new transport hub of Makati. It is also one of the PEZA-accredited zones, at par with other 39 Makati zones such as Zuellig Building, RCBC Plaza, and Makati Stock Exchange.

Unlike typical commercial offices in the Philippines, tenants or locators of the McKinley Exchange Corporate Center are required to regularly update the Makati government with a list of their labor requirements, so they can hire and prioritize qualified city residents. Tenants are also required to provide a list of training schools or centers that can teach disqualified candidates so they can be reconsidered for employment.

== Building specifications ==
McKinley Exchange Corporate Center is a Grade A building that has a 2,800 m^{2} (30,000 sq ft) floor plate to accommodate BPO and multinational company space requirements. It is also certified by the Philippine Economic Zone Authority (PEZA). It has five floors and a gross leasable area of 11,465 m^{2} (123,410 sq ft). It currently houses a branch of Telus International Philippines since 2015.

== Transportation ==
Bonifacio Transport Corporation has established a terminal at this building for its bus service (called the BGC Bus) along McKinley Road to provide access to different points in Bonifacio Global City and in Makati Central Business District. Jeepneys bound for Market! Market! also stop at this building.

A few meters from the McKinley Exchange Corporate Center lie the Ayala MRT station, where passengers can take the MRT-3, and One Ayala, located across EDSA with an intermodal transport terminal. Beside the building, passengers may also board the northbound EDSA Carousel bus at the Ayala bus stop, located on the curbside along EDSA. Taxis and shuttles also load and unload passengers at the building's driveway.
