= Fort McKinley =

Fort McKinley may refer to:

- Fort McKinley (Maine), a former U.S. Army site on Great Diamond Island, Maine, U.S.
- Fort McKinley, Ohio, an unincorporated community in Montgomery County, Ohio, U.S.
- Fort William McKinley (now known as Fort Bonifacio), headquarters of the Philippine Army in Taguig City, Philippines

== See also ==
- William McKinley, 25th president of the United States and namesake of the above
- McKinley (disambiguation)
- Fort McKinney (Wyoming)
