= McKinley Road =

Avenue in Metro Manila, Philippines

Coordinates: 14°32′50″N 121°2′17″E

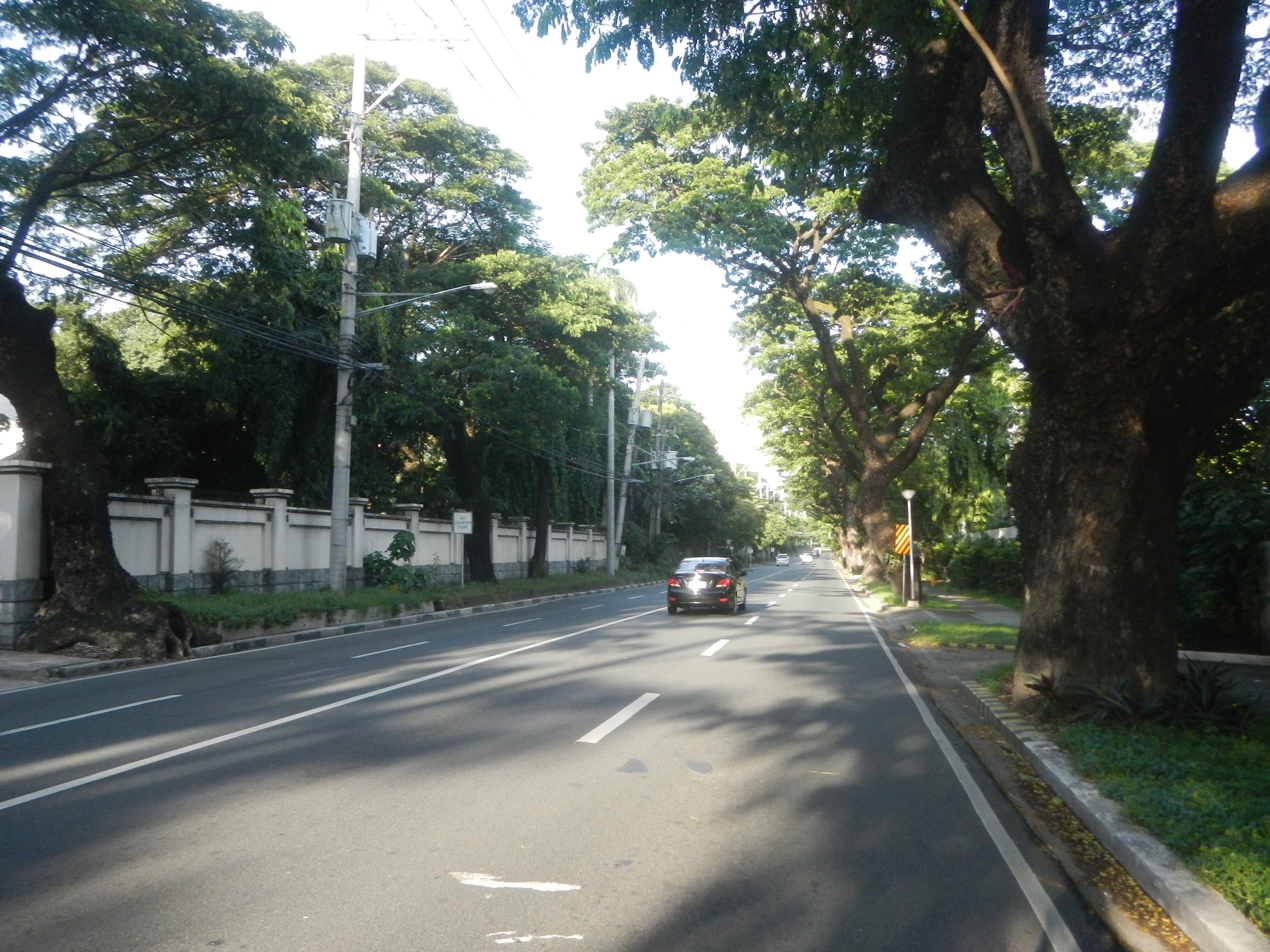
- McKinley Road near Harvard Road
- Interactive map of McKinley Road
- Former names: Pasay–McKinley Road; Pasay–Sakura Heiyei Road; Manila-Makati-Fort McKinley Road
- Namesake: William McKinley
- Maintained by: Department of Public Works and Highways (Makati segment only)
- Length: 1.964 km (1.220 mi)Including 1.926 km (1.197 mi) maintained by DPWH
- Location: Makati and Taguig
- From: AH 26 (N1) (Epifanio de los Santos Avenue) in Makati
- To: 5th Avenue in Bonifacio Global City, Taguig

McKinley Road is a tree-lined avenue linking the central business districts of Makati and Bonifacio Global City (BGC), Taguig in Metro Manila, Philippines. It is a continuation of Ayala Avenue, south of Epifanio de los Santos Avenue (EDSA), which runs for approximately 1.9 kilometers (1.2 mi) through the affluent neighborhoods of Forbes Park and Dasmariñas Village. It is home to the exclusive Manila Polo Club and the Manila Golf and Country Club.

McKinley Road has a residential character dominated by mansions with high walls and elaborate gates. At its centerpiece is the Spanish Mission-style Santuario de San Antonio Parish church that faces the San Antonio Plaza, the main public square of Forbes Park. A small arcade is on the opposite side of the plaza, housing The Marketplace grocery, a gourmet deli, a few cafés, and a bookstore. The rest of Forbes Park on both sides of McKinley is closed to non-residents.

== Route description ==
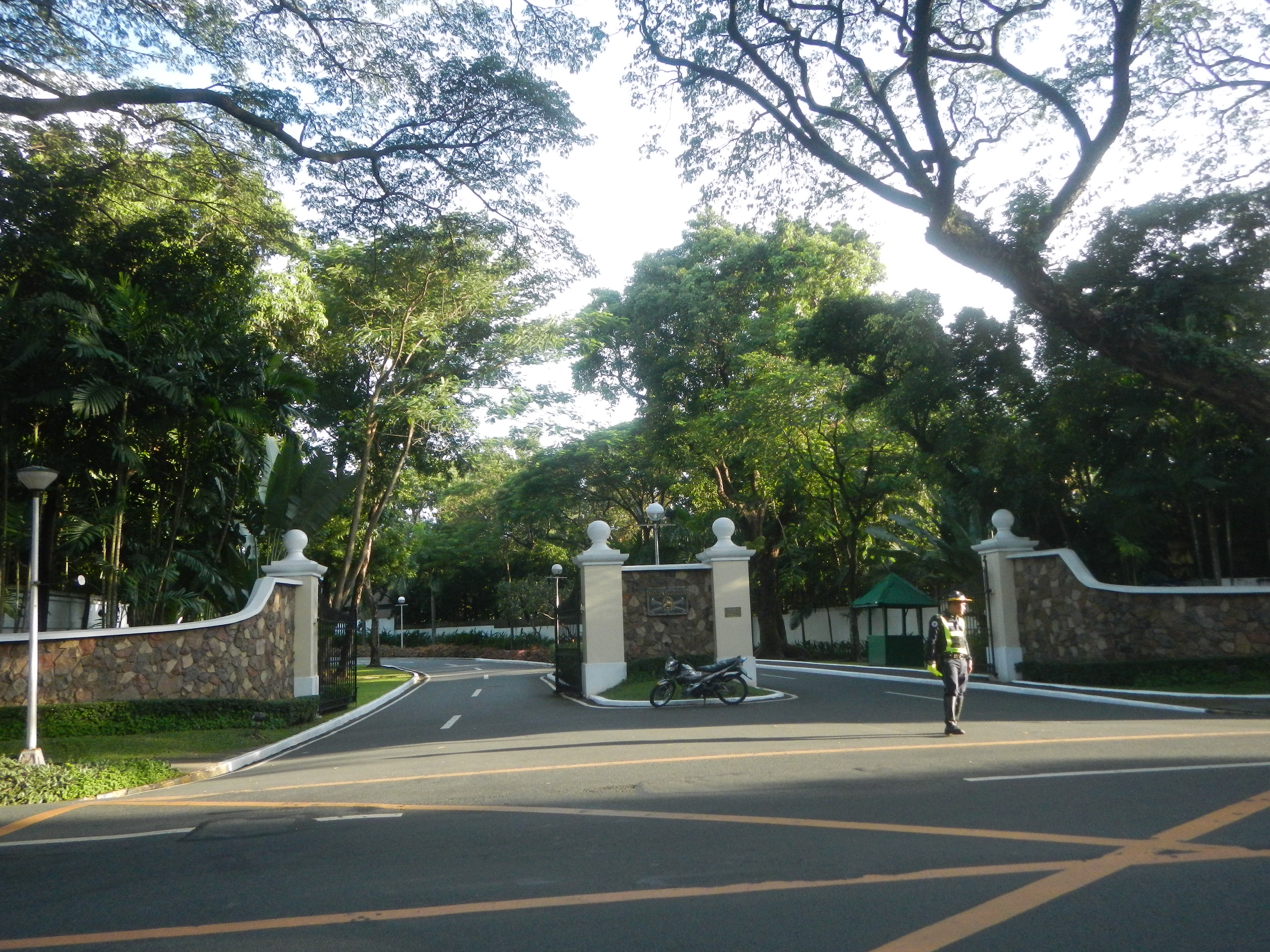
Manila Polo Club entrance gate on McKinley Road

The intersection at 5th Avenue is dominated by the Fairways Tower, a luxury condominium on the border of the Bonifacio district. The road winds past the southern edge of the Manila Golf Course as it heads toward the club's entrance at Harvard Road. The Manila Polo Club entrance is on the southern side of McKinley, opposite the golf course on a small side street not far from Harvard. Continuing 400 meters (1,300 ft) as the road bends slightly to the northwest, it reaches the San Antonio Plaza of Forbes Park. From Banyan Street just past the Plaza to Epifanio de los Santos Avenue (EDSA), McKinley marks the eastern boundary of Dasmariñas Village. The road terminates at EDSA, near the McKinley Exchange Corporate Center.

West of EDSA, the road resumes as Ayala Avenue, heading into the heart of Ayala Center and the Makati CBD. In Bonifacio Global City, east of 5th Avenue, the road continues as the McKinley Parkway, which heads east to the Serendra mixed-use development and the SM Aura and Market! Market! shopping malls.

== History ==
The road originally served as a northwest–southeast route between Fort William McKinley and Pasay, then in the province of Rizal, known as Pasay–McKinley Road, Pasay–Sakura Heiyei Road, Manila-Makati-Fort McKinley Road, and other various names recognized by the government per section, alongside the present-day Arnaiz Avenue. It also formed part of Route 57 or Highway 57. The road's eastern terminus was the Carabao Gate at the entrance to the Fort, on what is now the intersection with 5th Avenue. The road became disconnected in the 1950s when the Makati Commercial Center complex (now Glorietta complex at Ayala Center) was built over its section between Highway 54 (now EDSA) and Makati Avenue. The section between Highway 54 and Fort Bonifacio was then realigned to continue Ayala Avenue and became a separate road subsequently named for the U.S. military reservation to which it leads, which was, in turn, named after William McKinley, the 25th President of the United States, responsible for the U.S. colonization of the Philippines in 1898.

There are two other streets named McKinley in the area: McKinley Parkway, a continuation of McKinley Road in Bonifacio Global City, and Upper McKinley Road, an unrelated road on McKinley Hill further south via Lawton Avenue.

== Transportation ==
Bonifacio Transport Corporation provides the BGC Bus service along McKinley Road to different points within Bonifacio Global City from its terminal at the McKinley Exchange Corporate Center on EDSA beside the Ayala MRT station.

Jeepneys bound for Washington Street in Pio del Pilar and Market! Market! ply this road. These stop at the respective terminals adjacent to the road's intersection with EDSA.

== Intersections ==
Province	City/Municipality	km	mi	Destinations	Notes
Makati				AH 26 (N1) (EDSA)	Northern terminus. Traffic light intersection. No left turn allowed. Continues north as Ayala Avenue.
Makati				Banyan Road	Access to Dasmariñas and Forbes Park North Villages.
Makati				Narra Avenue	Access to Santuario de San Antonio and Forbes Park South Village.
Makati				Palm Avenue	
Makati				Flame Tree Road / Harvard Road	Access to Forbes Park North and South Villages.
Makati				Tamarind Road	Access to Forbes Park South Village.
Taguig				5th Avenue	Southern terminus. Traffic light intersection. No left turn allowed. Continues to Bonifacio Global City as McKinley Parkway.
1.000 mi = 1.609 km; 1.000 km = 0.621 mi: Incomplete access

== Landmarks ==
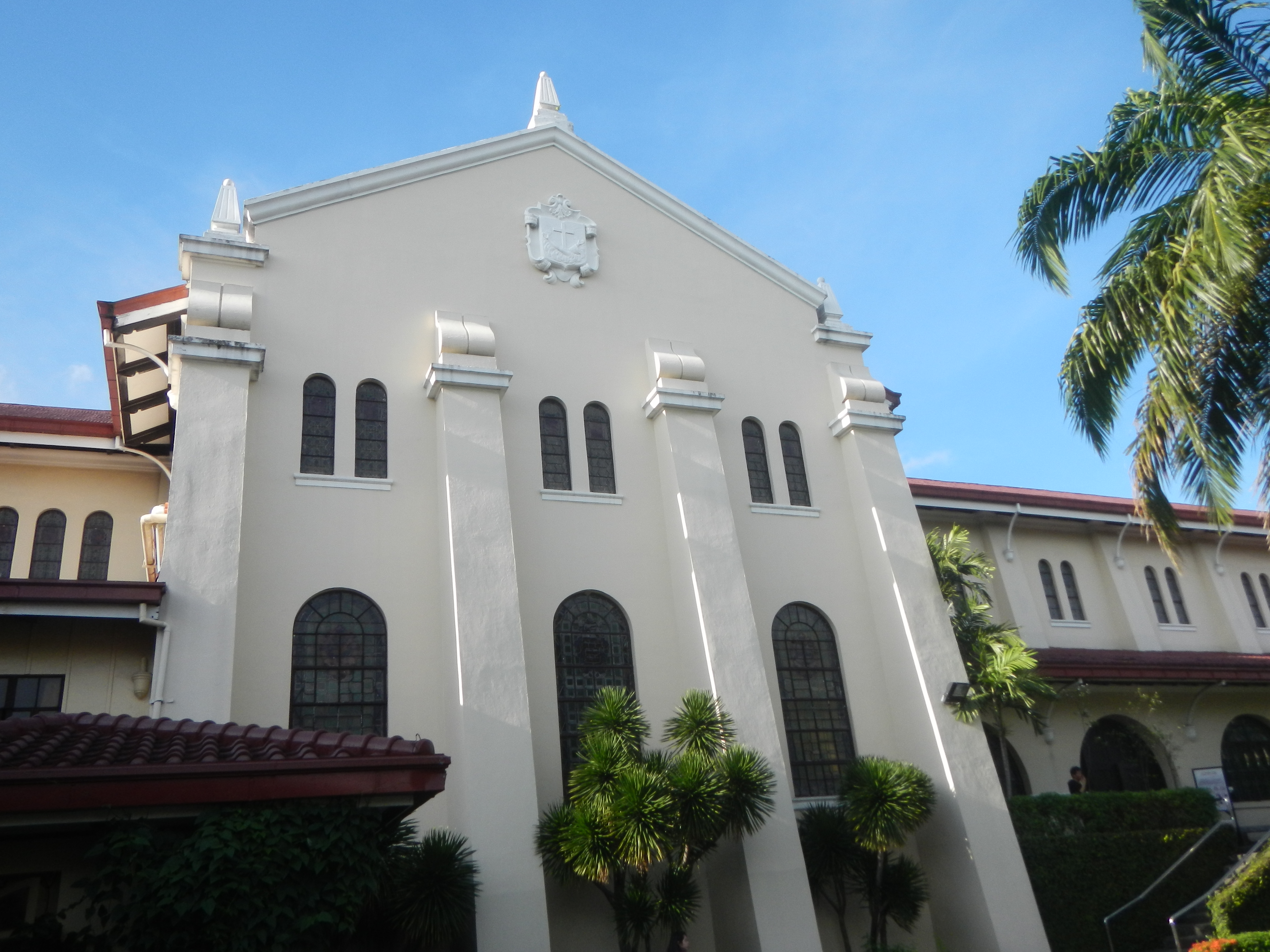
Santuario de San Antonio Parish

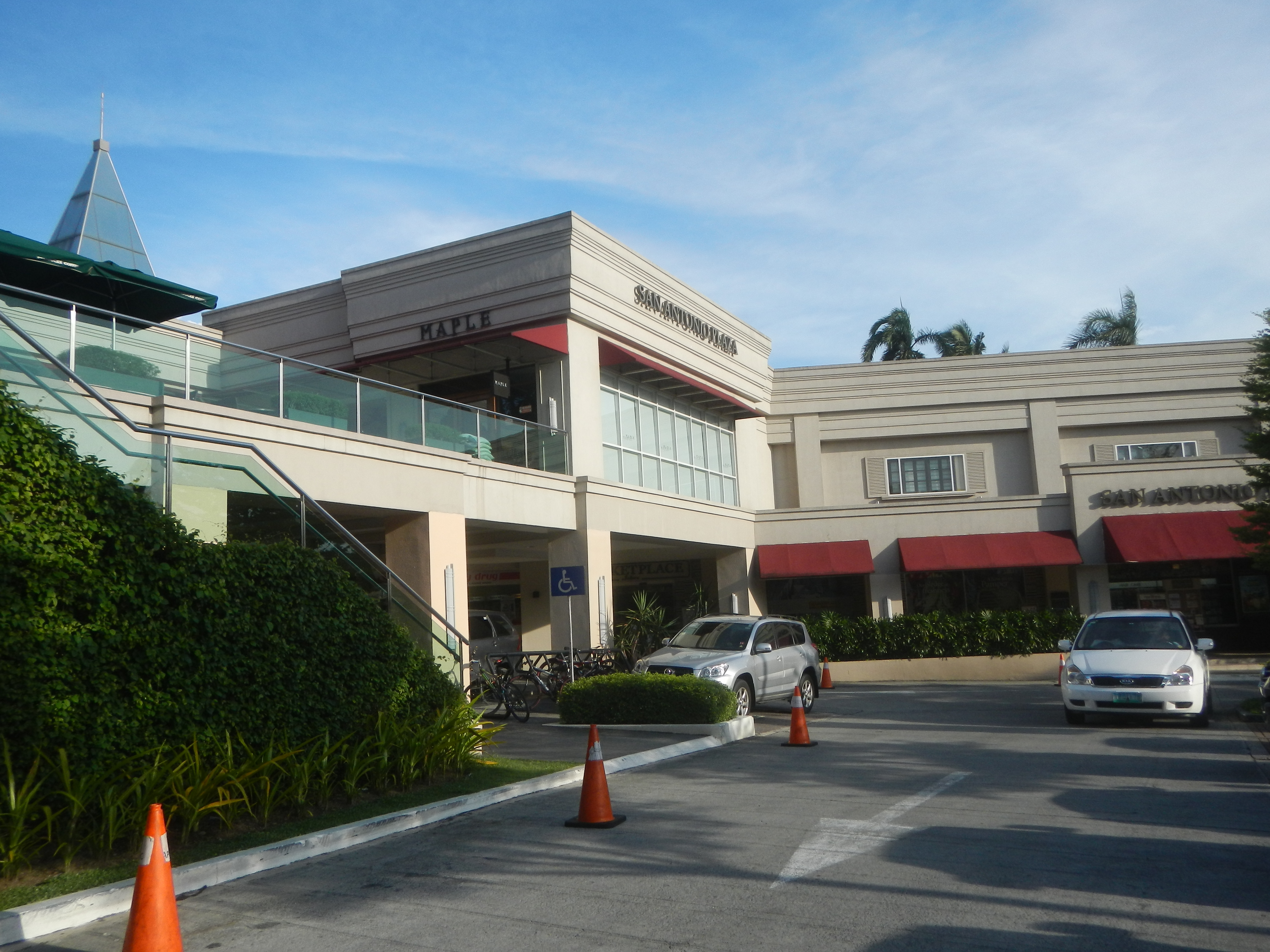
San Antonio Plaza

From west to east:

- McKinley Exchange Corporate Center
- Santuario de San Antonio, Roman Catholic parish
- Holy Trinity Church Manila, Anglican church in Forbes Park
- San Antonio Plaza
- San Antonio Plaza Arcade
- Manila Golf and Country Club
- Manila Polo Club
- BGC Greenway Park
- Fairways Tower

== See also ==
- Ayala Avenue
