= Manila Polo Club =

Polo club in Makati, Philippines

- Type: Polo club / Private club
- Founded: August 18, 1909 in Pasay, Rizal, Philippine Islands
- Founder: William Cameron Forbes
- Headquarters: McKinley Road, Forbes Park, Makati, Metro Manila, Philippines
- Services: Leisure amenities for members, Polo match organization, Events venue
- Website: www.manilapolo.com.ph

The Manila Polo Club is the premiere polo club in the Philippines. It was established in 1909 during the American colonial era by Governor General William Cameron Forbes as a venue for polo and leisure for the wealthy elite. It was originally located in Pasay prior to World War II, after which it transferred to its present location in Forbes Park, Makati.

== History ==
=== Early years: American period ===
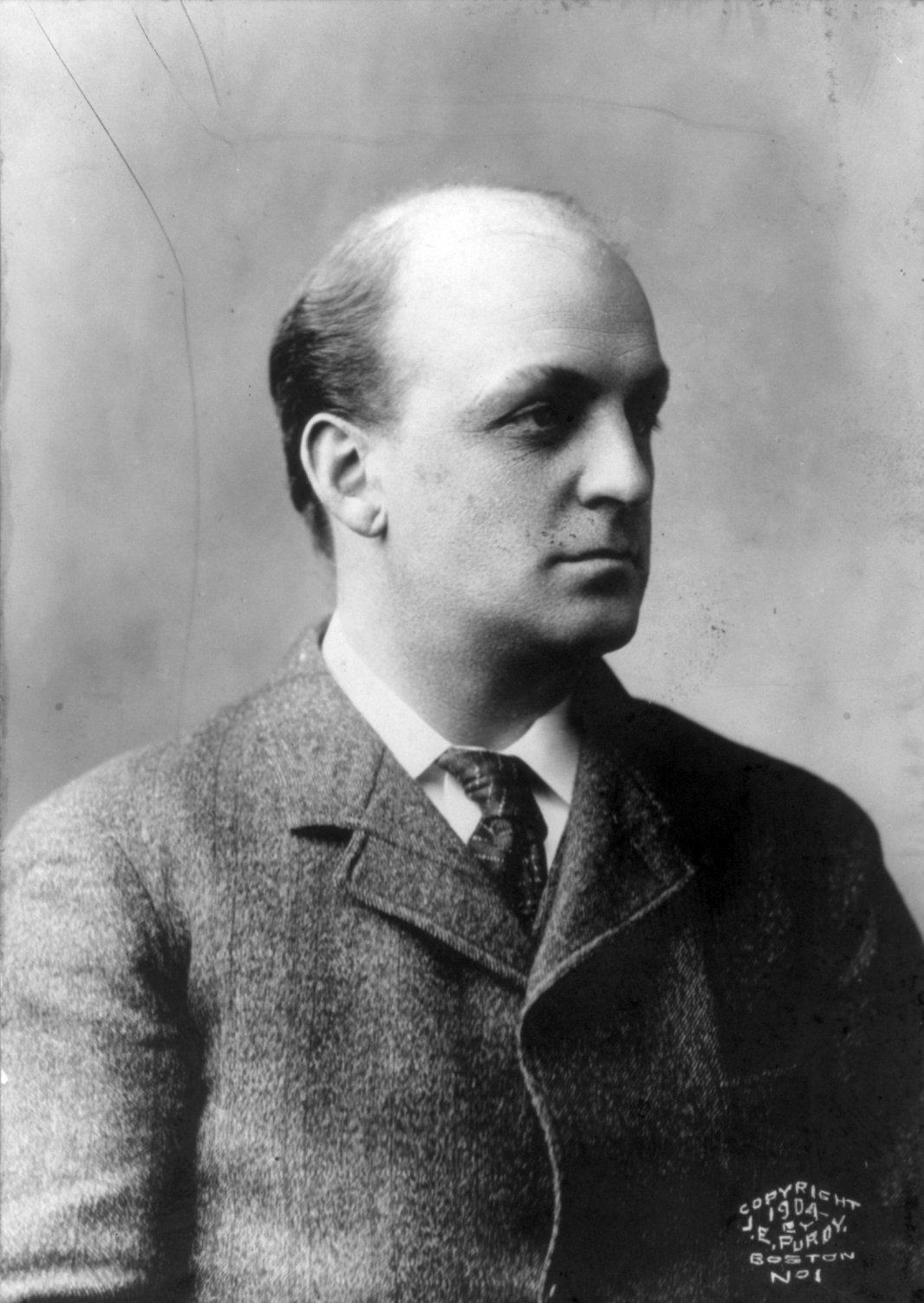
William Cameron Forbes, the founder of the Manila Polo Club.

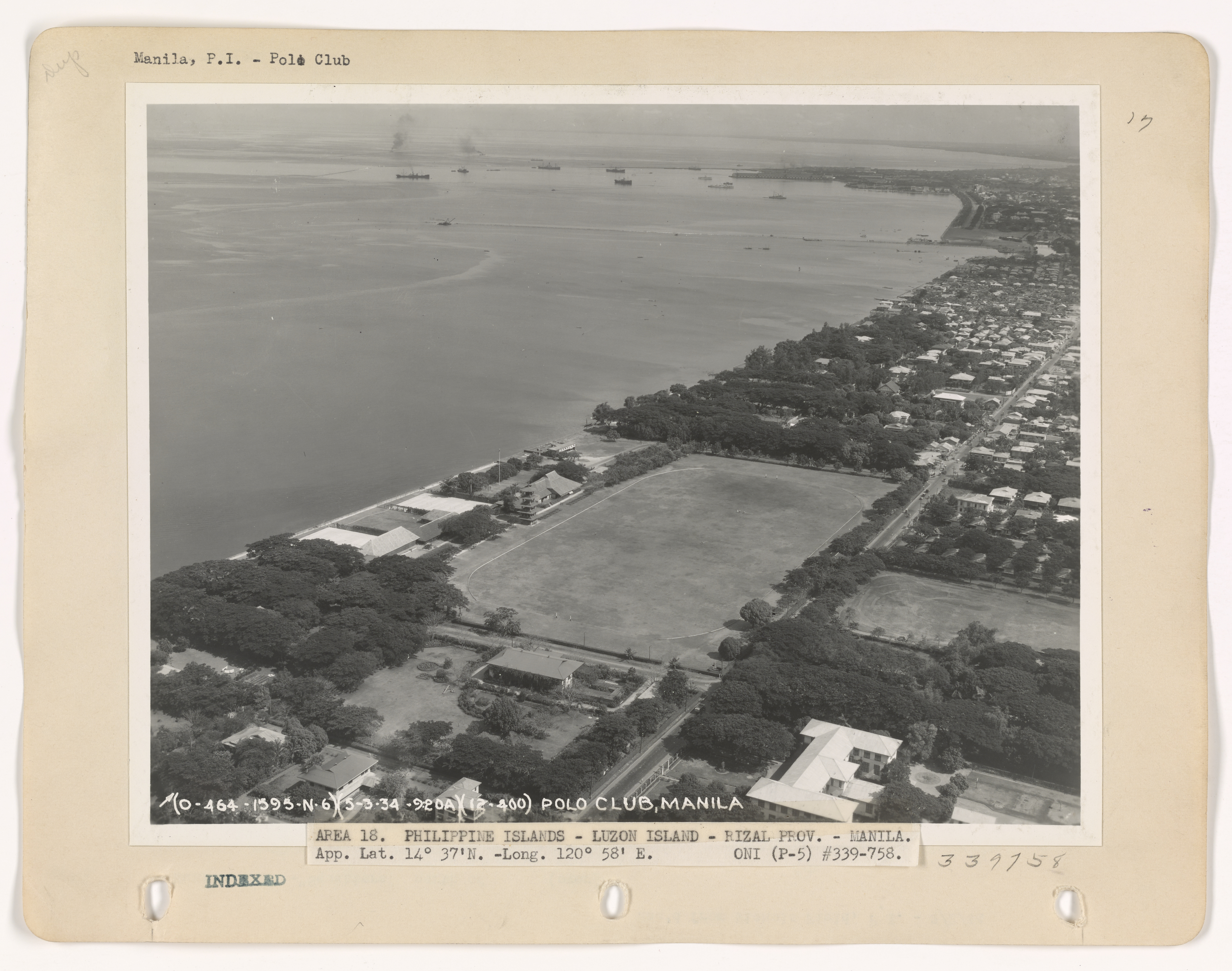
Manila Polo Club in Pasay, date unknown

The Manila Polo Club was incorporated on August 18, 1909 by American William Cameron Forbes, who would start serving as Governor-General of the Philippines within the same year. Forbes was a polo enthusiast who owned two polo fields in his estate in Boston, envisioned the club as a venue for polo and leisure for "gentlemen of a certain class" assigned to work in the Philippines like himself. Forbes is credited for establishing the first polo field in the Philippines and served as delegate of the club until the outbreak of World War II. The clubhouse was inaugurated on November 27, 1909.

The original location of the clubhouse was situated on land acquired by Forbes himself using his own money, along Calle Real (now F.B. Harrison Avenue) in Pasay. The club's membership was primarily American in its early years, and also had foreigners with different nationalities as its members. Complying with Forbes's original intention for the club, less than 20 percent of the club at that time were native Filipinos.

Aside from being a key figure in the club's establishment, Forbes also aided the growth of the club's reputation internationally due to his work as a writer and contributor for polo magazines published outside the Philippine islands. One of the high-profile guests of the club in the pre-World War II era was then Prince of Wales Edward VIII, who played a polo match with an American team at the MPC's clubhouse.

In July 1922, the Manila Polo Club became a member of the United States Polo Association, which led to the organization of the Far Eastern Circuit, which saw the participation of several army camps.

In the 1930s, a dispute regarding the application of an aspirant member caused a schism. The club voted against the membership application of Manuel Nieto, a colonel who served as an aide to then-Philippine President Manuel L. Quezon, which caused the Elizalde brothers to resign their membership with the club and found the Los Tamaraos Polo Club in 1937.

=== World War II and relocation ===
When the Japanese occupied the Philippines during the World War II, the Manila Polo Club was taken over by the Japanese military and converted to become the Japanese Navy Recreation Club. The original clubhouse was later burned down during the Battle of Manila of 1945.

After the war, the club was temporarily hosted in a 1.8-hectare (4.4-acre) property along Dewey Boulevard (now Roxas Boulevard) in Pasay. Businessmen Alfonso Zóbel de Ayala & Joseph McMicking of Ayala y Compañía convinced the club to move to Makati, particularly in an area which was being developed by their company. That area would later be known as Forbes Park, named after club founder Forbes. The new Manila Polo Club opened in 1949, with its clubhouse having been designed by Pablo S. Antonio, Sr. By the 1960s, more Filipinos and non-American foreigners had become members of the club, and in 1964, the club elected Enrique J. Zóbel as its president, marking the first time the club was led by a Filipino.

=== Reforms ===
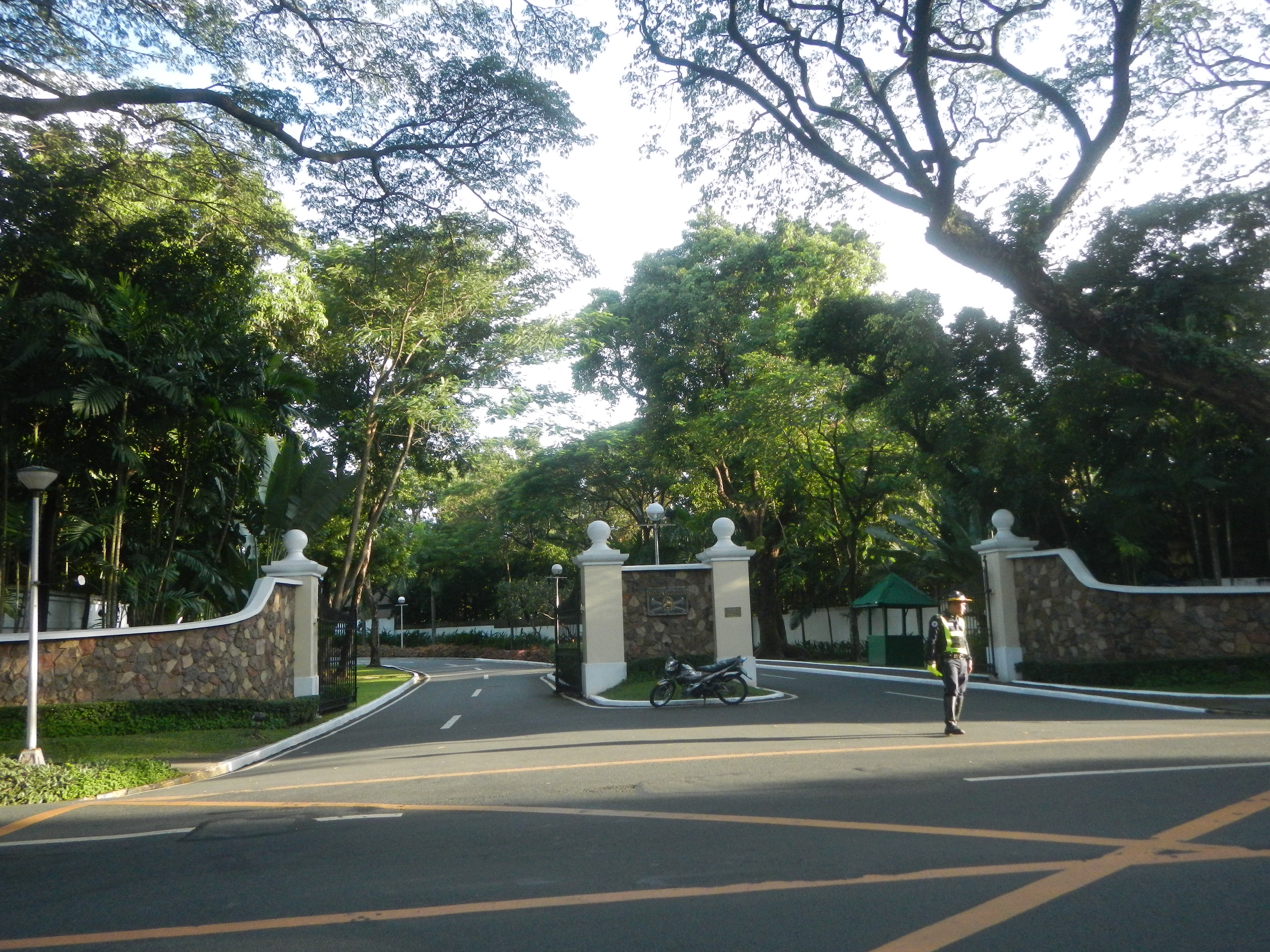
McKinley Road entrance

The Manila Polo Club became a proprietary share club in 1979 and under the new set-up, the club's membership was required to consist of 60 percent Filipino and 40 percent foreign. In 1983, the club allowed the transfer of shares to widows of its male members, allowing women to become full members. María Paz Rufino Laurel-Tanjangco was the first female member of the club. In 1987, gender-related restrictions on membership was dropped. Maribel Ongpin became the club's first female board member in 1995 and Isabel Caro Wilson became the club's first female president.

== Membership ==
Membership in the Manila Polo Club is reserved for very affluent individuals due to the high cost of shares of stock in the club. However, ownership of shares does not necessarily equate to membership. To become a member, an aspirant must secure referrals from two current members and endorsements from five other current members. The name of the aspirant is posted on the club's bulletin board for 30 days, and any member can provide to the membership committee any feedback regarding the aspirant. By the end of the 30-day period, the membership committee schedules an interview with the aspirant, after which the members of the committee anonymously vote by casting a black or white ball - the former signifies rejection - to approve or deny an aspirant's application. If rejected, an aspirant could apply for membership again after six months.

Prior to 1983, membership was restricted to males, although wives of members were allowed to use the club's facilities. The club's facilities are also available for rental to non-members, provided that there is sponsorship from a member.

As per the organization's by-laws, the incumbent President of the Philippines and the incumbent Mayor of Makati are granted honorary membership and do not have to pay for shares in stock of the club; they can use the facilities of the club, but they have to pay like the regular members do.
