= Forbes Park, Makati =

Barangay in Makati, Metro Manila, Philippines

Coordinates: 14°33′N 121°02′E

Forbes Park
- Barangay
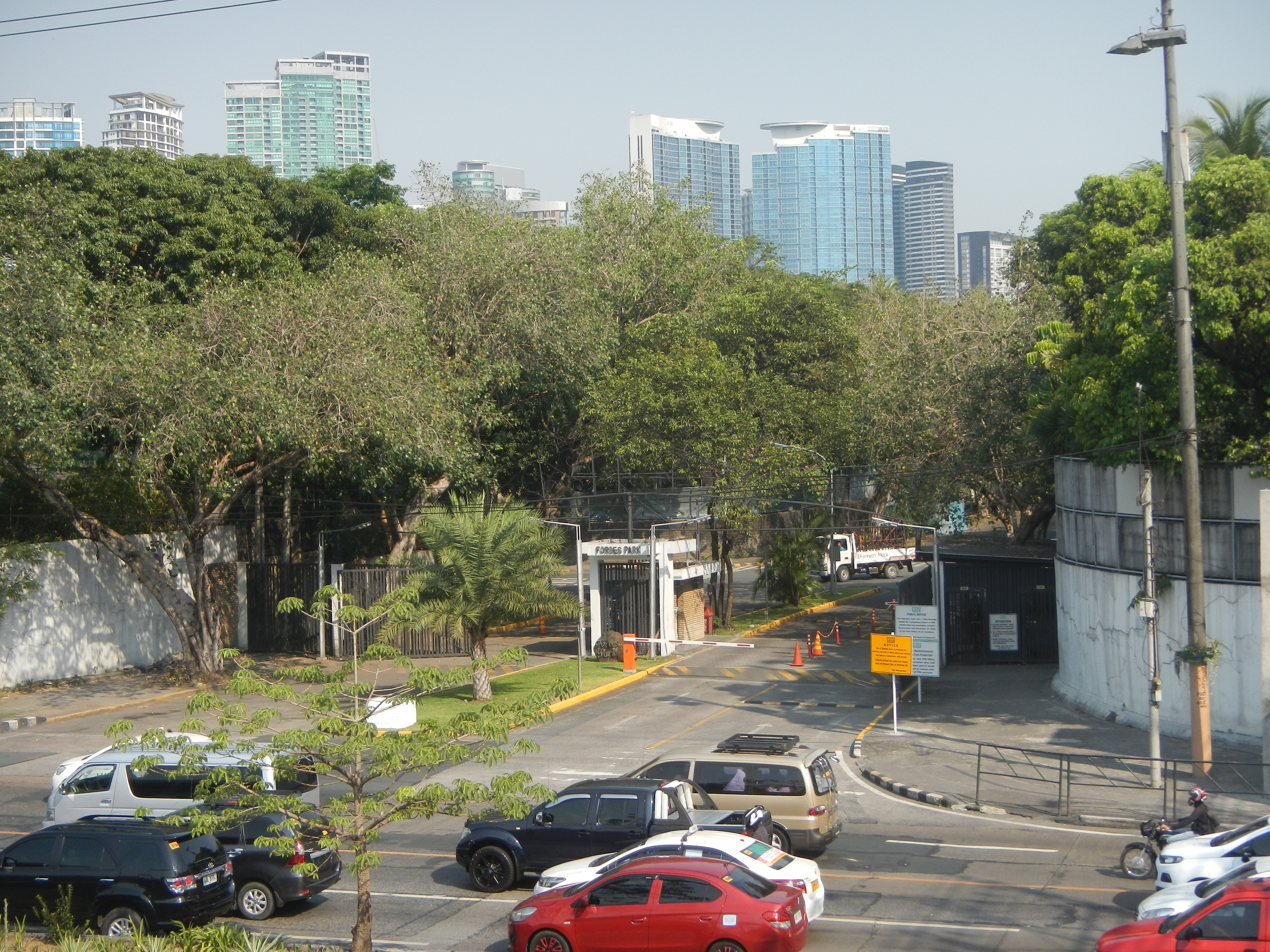
- Gate along EDSA

- Map of Makati with Forbes Park highlighted

- Location within Metro Manila
- Country: Philippines
- Region: National Capital Region
- City: Makati
- District: Part of the 1st district of Makati
- Founded: 1940s
- Named for: William Cameron Forbes

Government
  - Type: Barangay
  - Barangay Captain: Evangeline Manotok
  - Barangay Councilors: Members: Ana Maria Borromeo; Maria Micaela Remulla; Marcus Leslie Suntay; Nicolo Villonco; Carlo Felicito Bernardino; Maria Monica Teresa Concepcion
  - SK Chairperson: Rosanna Mercedes Periquet
  - SK Councilors: Members: Tanya Michelle Go; Joaquin Juan Paulo Mabanta; Mariel Alexander Yulo; Ryanne Cristina Uy; Maria Christina Lourdes Montelibano; Rafael Luis Alfonso Montelibano

Area
  - Total: 2.5 km^{2} (0.97 sq mi)

Population (2020)
  - Total: 3,715
  - Density: 1,500/km^{2} (3,800/sq mi)
- Time zone: UTC+8 (PST)
- ZIP Code: 1219 (Forbes Park North); 1220 (Forbes Park South)
- Area code: 2
- PSGC: 137602008
- Website: forbesparkassociation.com

Forbes Park is a private residential subdivision, gated community, and barangay in Makati, Metro Manila, Philippines. Established in 1940s partly out of the nearby barangay Pinagkaisahan, Forbes Park was named after William Cameron Forbes, the fifth American governor-general of the Philippines during the American Insular Government.

The subdivision is divided into Forbes Park North and Forbes Park South by McKinley Road and is bounded roughly by barangay Pinagkaisahan to the north, Bel-Air and Urdaneta Villages across Epifanio de los Santos Avenue to the northwest, Taguig (Fort Bonifacio which includes Bonifacio Global City) to the east, the Maricaban Creek to the south, and Dasmariñas Village to the west. With an area of 2.5 square kilometers (0.97 sq mi), it is Makati's largest barangay in terms of land area since the transfer of the previous holder, Post Proper Southside, to Taguig in 2023.

It was the first gated village in the Philippines to be developed by Ayala Corporation, and was considered a catalyst for urban development in Makati. It is also home to the Manila Golf and Country Club and the Manila Polo Club. Forbes Park has been called the "Beverly Hills of Manila" because many of the country's wealthiest families, as well as foreign diplomats, live there.

The Santuario de San Antonio Parish, a Franciscan church, and San Antonio Plaza, a small commercial center, lie between North and South Forbes Park. Meanwhile, the Church of the Holy Trinity, an Anglican-Episcopalian pro-cathedral, is just across the road.
