= Dasmariñas, Makati =

Barangay in Makati, Philippines

Dasmariñas Dasmariñas Village
- Barangay
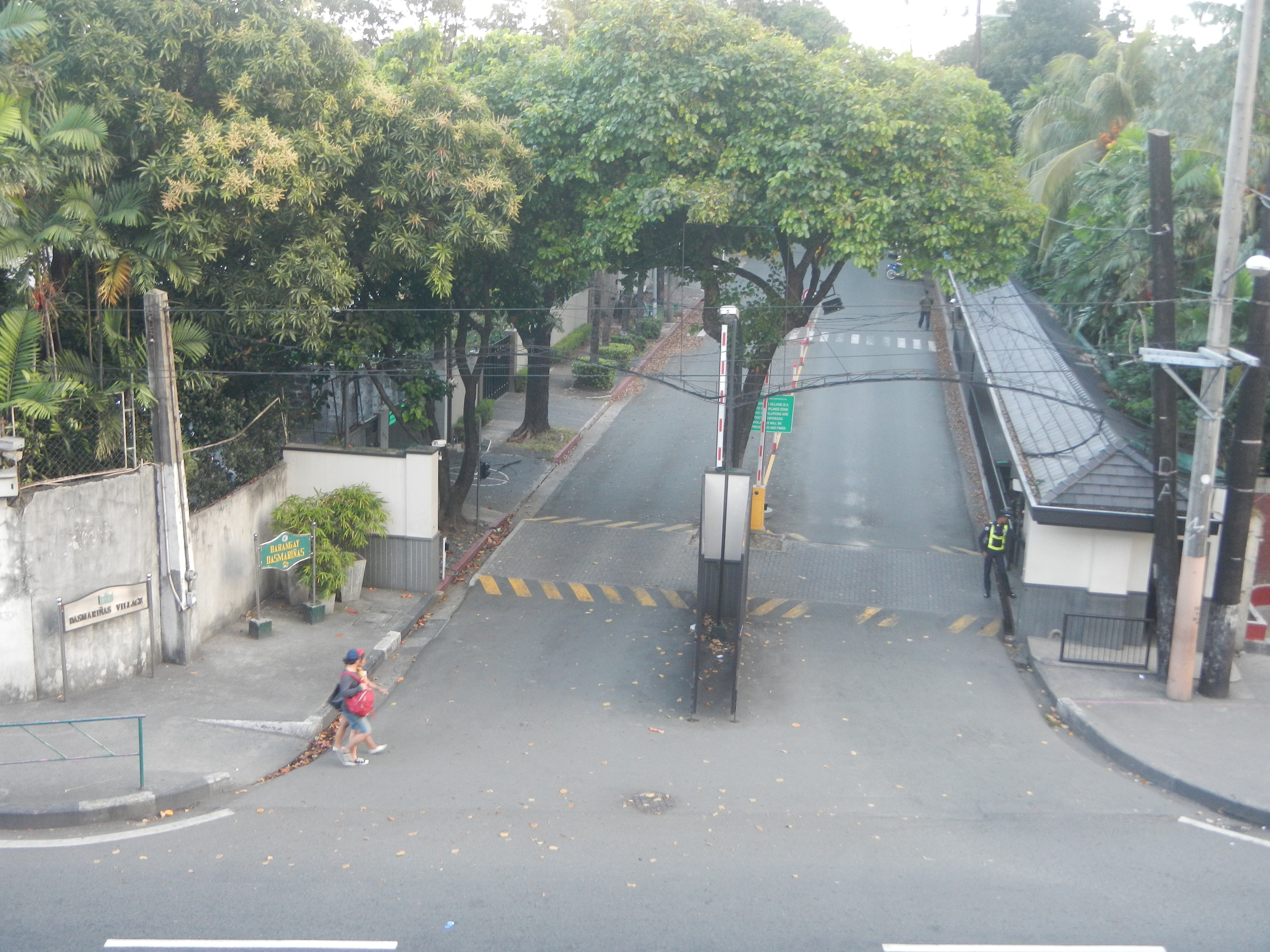
- Amorsolo Gate of Dasmariñas Village along EDSA
- Interactive map of Dasmariñas
- Location within Metro Manila
- Coordinates: 14.541°N 121.028°E
- Country: Philippines
- Region: National Capital Region
- City: Makati
- District: Part of the 1st district of Makati
- Established (as barangay): March 1971

Government
  - Type: Barangay
  - Barangay captain: Wellington James Lim
  - Barangay councilors: Members: Mikki Eala; Rodolfo Legaspi; Joshua Jao; Giny Gonzales; Patrick Apostol; Renzo Herbosa
  - SK Chairperson: Natalia Georgianna Tupaz
  - Electorate: 3,954 (2018)

Area
  - Land: 1.9033 km^{2} (0.7349 sq mi)

Population (2020)
  - Total: 4,160
  - Density: 2,200/km^{2} (5,700/sq mi)
- Time zone: UTC+8 (PST)
- ZIP code: 1221–1222

Dasmariñas is a barangay in Makati, Philippines. It occupies 187 hectares or 1.87 square kilometers and is bounded by EDSA to the north, McKinley Road to the northeast, Pili Avenue/Forbes Park South to the east, Maricaban Creek to the south, and Ecology Village to the west. It is roughly coterminous with Dasmariñas Village, a gated private residential subdivision. According to the 2020 census, it is inhabited by 4,160 people. The village is managed by the Dasmariñas Village Association (DVA).

== History ==
Dasmariñas Village was developed by Ayala Compañía in the early 1960s and was originally conceived as part of Forbes Park. It is believed to be the first housing development in the Philippines to include air conditioning as a standard feature in all its houses. DVA was incorporated in 1965, while Barangay Dasmariñas was split from Forbes Park and established in 1971.

Colegio San Agustin, a private co-educational school founded in 1969, is located within the premises of Dasmariñas Village, specifically on Palm Avenue. The school is attended by residents and non-residents of the village.

== Amenities ==
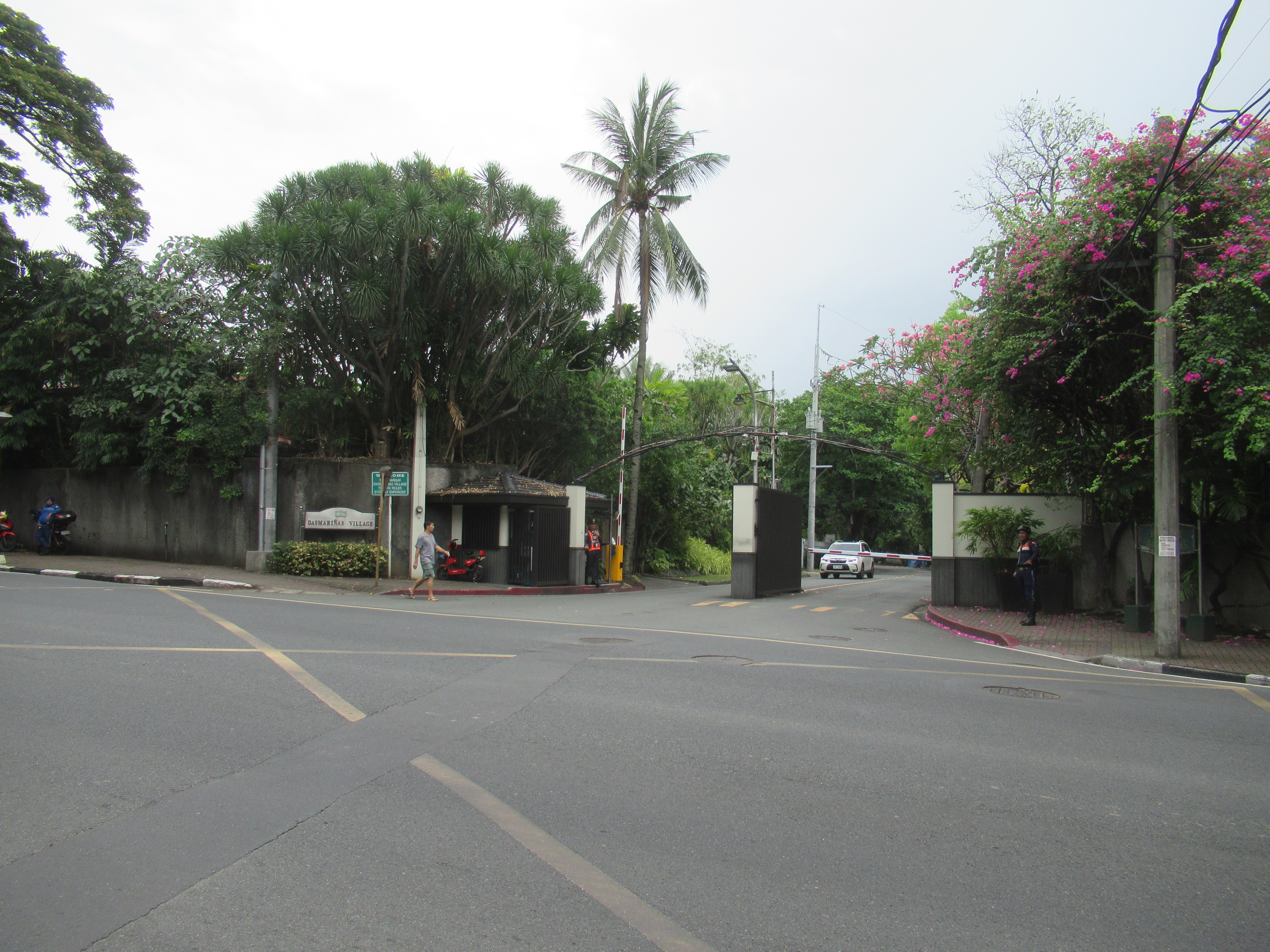
Banyan Gate of Dasmariñas Village along McKinley Road

Dasmariñas Village contains two parks (Campanilla Park and Mahogany Park), a post office, an enclosed pavilion that is rented out for private functions, a gym, a basketball and badminton court, and a tennis court, all managed by the Dasmariñas Village Association. In addition, Barangay Dasmariñas runs a medical clinic and a dental clinic for residents and their hired help.
