= McKinley, Minnesota =

McKinley is the name of more than one place in Minnesota:

- McKinley, St. Louis County, Minnesota
- McKinley, Kittson County, Minnesota
- McKinley, Minneapolis, Minnesota
