= BGC Bus =

Bus system in Bonifacio Global City

Bonifacio Transport Corp.

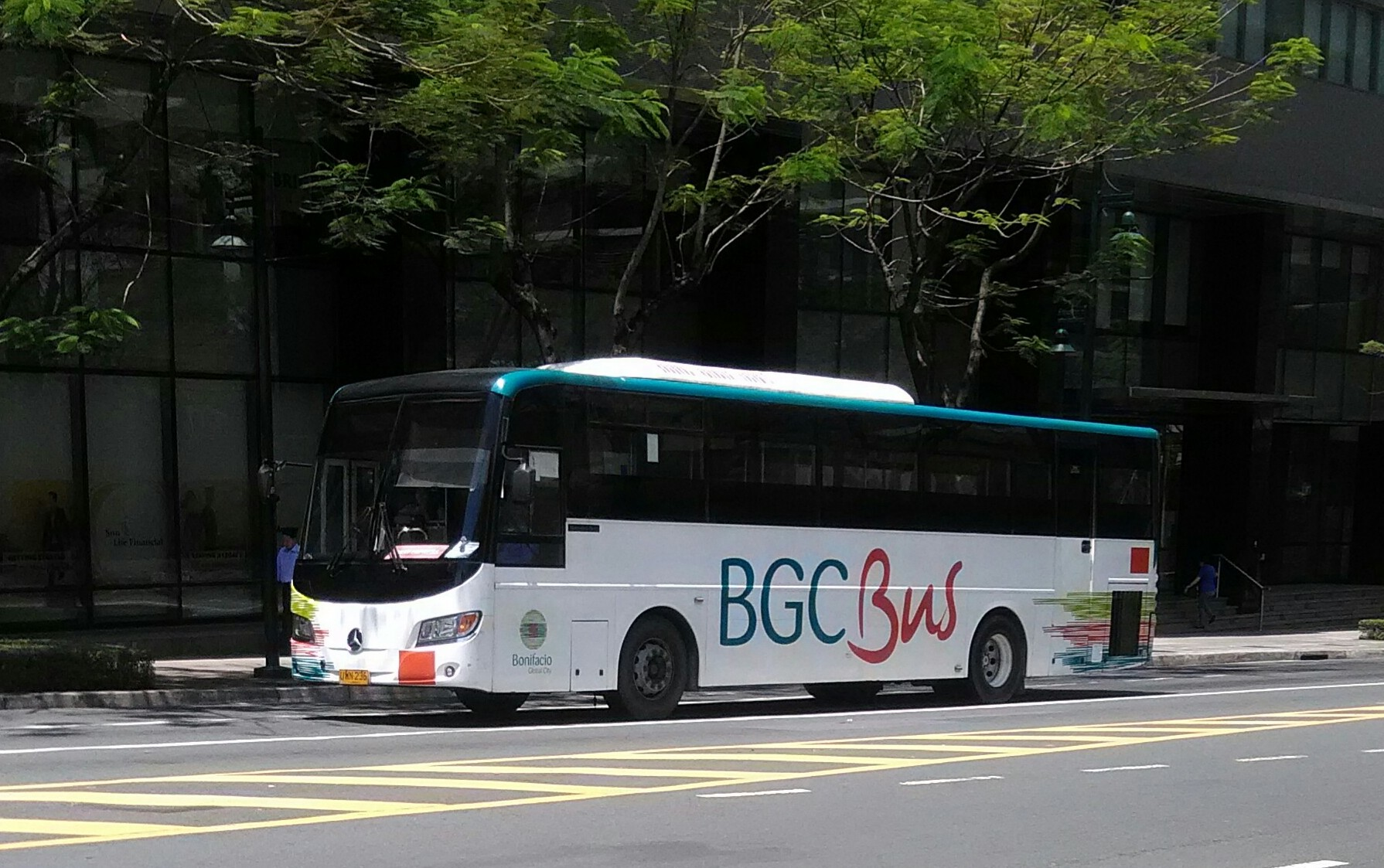
- A Mercedes-Benz Citaro bus operating under the BGC Bus transport system.
- Founded: 1998; 28 years ago
- Headquarters: 2/F Bonifacio Technology Centre, 31st Street cor. 2nd Avenue, Bonifacio Global City, Taguig, Metro Manila
- Service area: Bonifacio Global City
- Service type: City Operation
- Operator: Fort Bonifacio Development Corp.

The Bonifacio Transport Corporation, or more commonly known as BGC Bus or formerly The Fort Bus, is an intercity bus company in Metro Manila, the Philippines, serving routes plying the Bonifacio Global City (BGC), Taguig, with routes connecting BGC to Makati and to Arca South, also in Taguig, as well as a route connecting Makati and Gil Puyat LRT station in Pasay.

The company is a subsidiary of the Fort Bonifacio Development Corporation (FBDC), an affiliate company under the Ayala Corporation. The bus system uses the Beep contactless smart card and GCash e-wallet as modes of electronic payment.

Its bus depot is situated in the western part of Bonifacio Global City, near the Kalayaan Flyover.

== History ==
Founded in 1998, the Bonifacio Transport Corporation was established under the Fort Bonifacio Development Corporation (FBDC). It was formed through an initial fleet of 24 buses — 10 of which are Mercedes-Benz buses and the rest are a mix of Daewoo, and Nissan Diesel units — as an intercity transport system to and from the adjacent business districts of Bonifacio Global City and Ayala Center.

In 2008, six Mercedes-Benz O500M 1725 buses were deployed by FBDC, followed by an additional 14 buses to keep up with passenger demand. In the same year, HM Transport Inc. and the Bonifacio Transport Corporation signed an agreement, allowing the use of HM Transport buses to serve routes to and from Bonifacio Global City. As a result, a weekday bus route between the Market! Market! shopping mall in Taguig, EDSA, and Kalayaan Avenue was established.

In 2016, the BGC Bus replaced its TapBGC contactless smart card with AF Payments Inc.'s Beep card. A limited public trial was conducted from June 11 to 26, and was fully rolled out on June 27, 2016.

In 2024, BGC Bus route was extended to Gil Puyat station in Pasay which began on May 20, initially operating only on weekday mornings.

In August 2025, BGC Bus acquired new Higer KLQ6116G and KLQ6129GEV "Azure" buses as part of their fleet modernization.

== Fleet ==
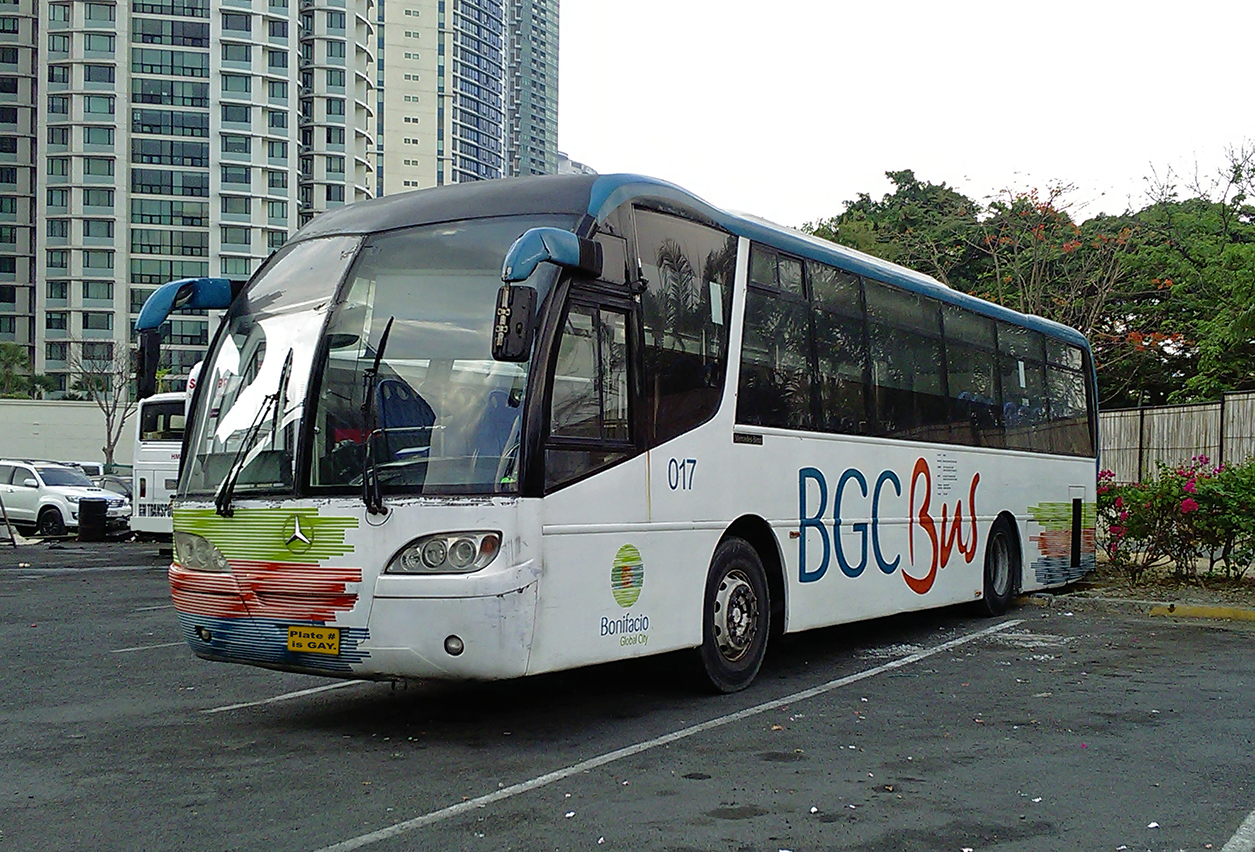
Mercedes-Benz DMMW Aero Extreme

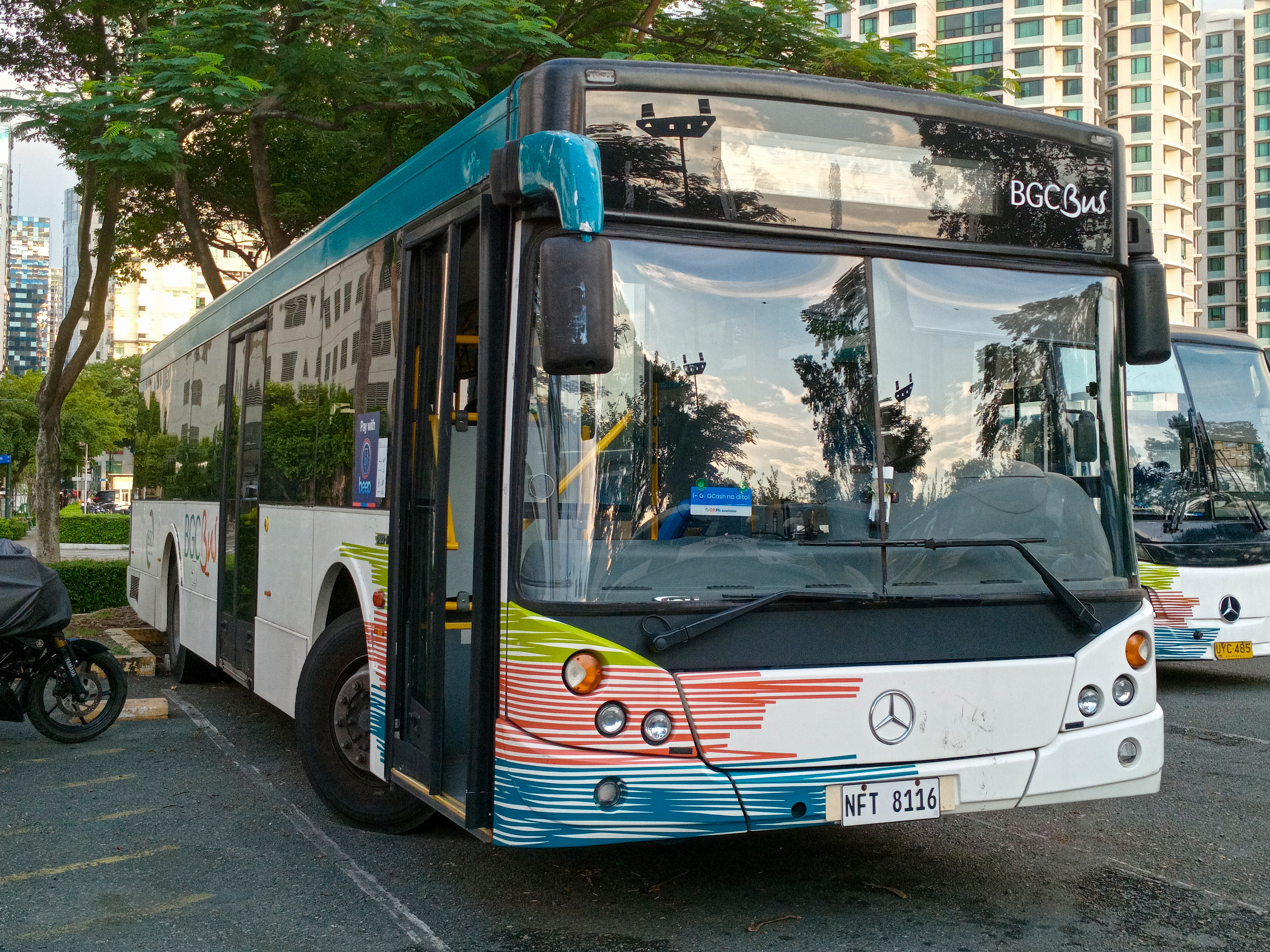
MCV Evolution C120 LE

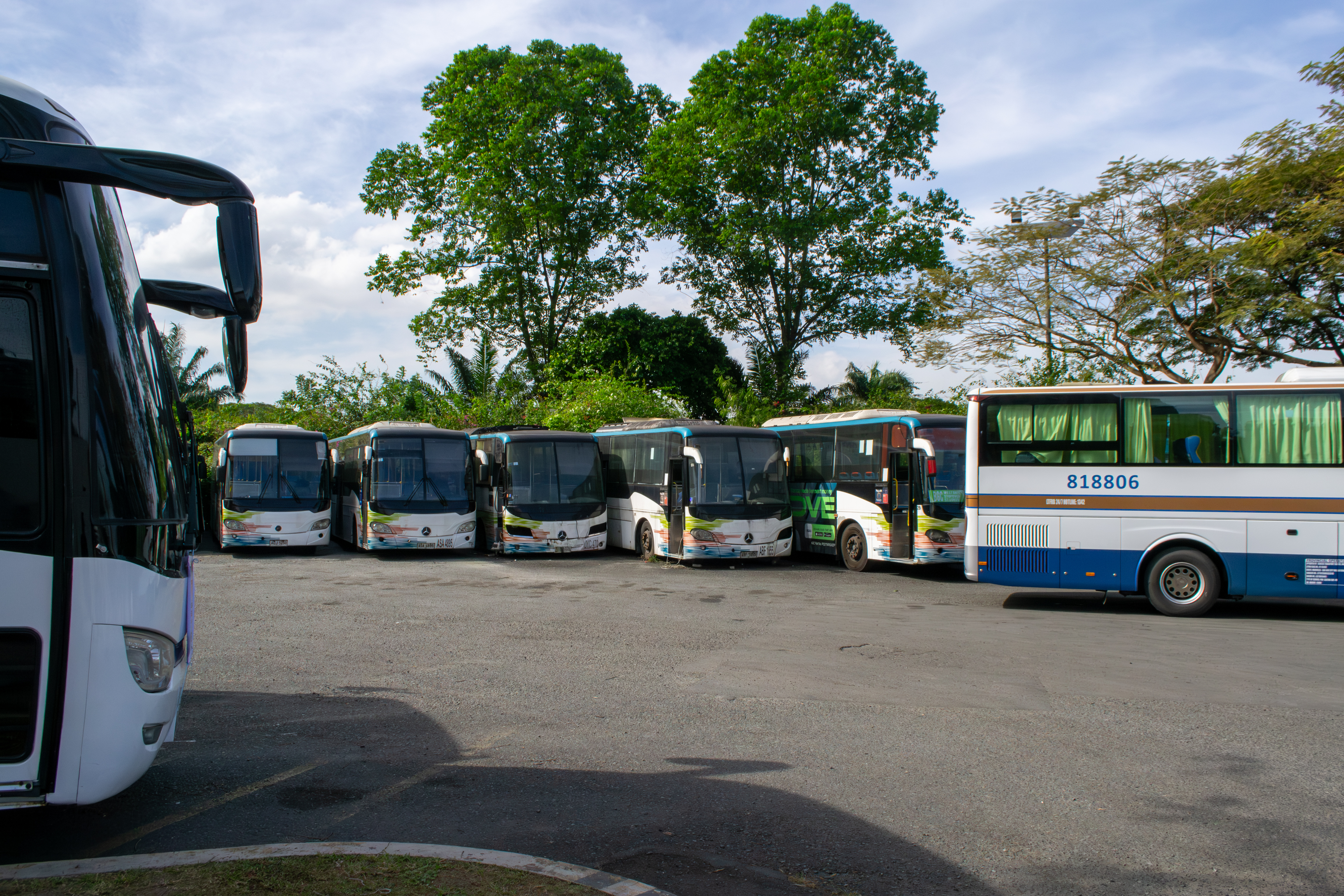
Buses parked at the BGC Bus Depot at 31st St., Bonifacio Global City, Taguig.

Bonifacio Transport Corp. utilizes and maintains Mercedes-Benz and Higer buses.

- Mercedes-Benz
  - Almazora Tourist Star
  - MCV Evolution C120 LE
- Higer Bus Company Limited
  - KLQ6116G
  - KLQ6126GEV "Azure"

These buses were formerly operated by Bonifacio Transport Corp. They have since been sold off, scrapped, or simply left inactive.

- Daewoo
  - FDIC Daewoo BF105
  - FDIC Spider Series (Daewoo BS106 chassis)
- Isuzu
  - Almazora City Star (Isuzu Forward Chassis)
- Mercedes-Benz
  - Almazora Travel Star
  - Almazora Tourist Star (some were given early retirement)
  - DMMW Aero Extreme
- UD Nissan Diesel
  - Santarosa EXFOH (Nissan Diesel Condor Chassis)

== Routes ==
As of January 2025, BGC Bus operates primarily on 8 different routes with main terminals at the McKinley Exchange Corporate Center, also known as the EDSA Ayala Terminal, in Makati and at the Market! Market! mall in Taguig. On August 7, 2017, express bus routes were introduced. All times are in Philippine Standard Time (UTC+08:00).

List of BGC Bus routes
Route	Origin		Destination	via	Schedule	Ref.
East Express	EX01 EDSA Ayala	↔	EX02 Market! Market!		Monday to Friday; 6 AM to 10 PM	
North Route	N01 EDSA Ayala	↔	N07 The Globe Tower	N05 Uptown Mall	Monday to Sunday; 6 AM to 9 PM	
Central Route	C01 Market! Market!	↔	C09 University Parkway	C05 Bonifacio Stopover	Monday to Friday; 5 AM to 10 PM	
Arca South Express	AS01 Arca South (FTI)	↔	AS02 AS10 Market! Market!	Circumferential Road 5	Monday to Friday; To BGC: 6:40 AM; To Arca South: 5 PM	
West Route	W01 EDSA Ayala	↔	W09 Fort Victoria	W05 The Fort	Monday to Friday; 5 AM to 10 PM	
Weekend Route	WR01 WR18 EDSA Ayala	↔	WR17 Fort Victoria	WR12 Market! Market!	Saturday and Sunday; 5 AM to 10 PM	
Night Route	NR01 NR17 EDSA Ayala	↔	NR16 Fort Victoria	NR11 Market! Market!	Monday to Sunday; 10 PM to 5 AM	
LRT - Ayala Route	L01 EDSA Ayala (MECC)	→	L17 One Ayala	L08 L10 LRT Buendia; L09 Leveriza	Monday to Friday; 6 AM to 9 AM & 5 PM to 8 PM	

List of discontinued BGC Bus routes
Route	Origin		Destination	Schedule	Ref.
North Route	N01 North Station	↔	N12 Uptown Parade	Monday to Friday; 6 AM to 10 PM	
Nuvali Express	NU01 Nuvali	↔	NU02 Market! Market!	Monday to Friday; To BGC: 6:30 AM; To Nuvali: 6:30 PM to 7:15 PM	
Upper West Express	WX01 EDSA Ayala	↔	WX03 Crescent Park West	Monday to Friday; 6 AM to 10 PM	
Lower West Express	L01 EDSA Ayala	↔	L05 Fort Victoria	Monday to Friday; 6 AM to 10 PM	
Ayala Express	AX01 EDSA Ayala	↔	AX10 Glorietta 5	Monday to Friday; 6 AM to 10 PM	
North Express Route	NX01 EDSA Ayala	↔	NX07 BGC Arts Center	Monday to Friday; 6 AM to 1 AM; Saturday and Sunday; 6 AM to 12 AM	
BHS-Ayala Express	BA01 EDSA Ayala	↔	BA02 One Bonifacio High Street	Sunday to Thursday; 10:15 PM; Friday and Saturday; 11:15 PM	

== See also ==
- List of bus routes in Metro Manila
- List of bus companies of the Philippines
- Premium Point-to-Point Bus Service
