= McKinlay =

McKinlay is a surname. Notable people with the surname include:

- Adam McKinlay (1887–1950), member of the British House of Commons for a number of Scottish constituencies
- Billy McKinlay (born 1969), former Scottish footballer, Reserve Team Manager of Fulham in London, England
- Bob McKinlay (1932–2002), Scottish footballer who played for Nottingham Forest
- Donald McKinlay (1891–1959), Scottish footballer (defender)
- Duncan E. McKinlay (1862–1914), U.S. Representative from California
- Jake McKinlay (2001–2021), New Zealand basketball player
- John McKinlay (1819–1872), explorer of Australia
- Ken McKinlay (1928–2003), international speedway rider
- Tosh McKinlay (born 1964), Scottish former international footballer

== See also ==
- McKinley
- MacKinlay
- McKinlay, Queensland, town in Australia
- McKinlay Shire, local government area in Australia
- Mount McKinlay, a mountain in the Gammon Ranges of South Australia
