= McKinley, Wisconsin =

McKinley is the name of some places in the U.S. state of Wisconsin:

- McKinley, Polk County, Wisconsin, a town
  - McKinley (community), Wisconsin, an unincorporated community
- McKinley, Taylor County, Wisconsin, a town
