= Bonifacio High Street =

Mixed-use development in the Philppines

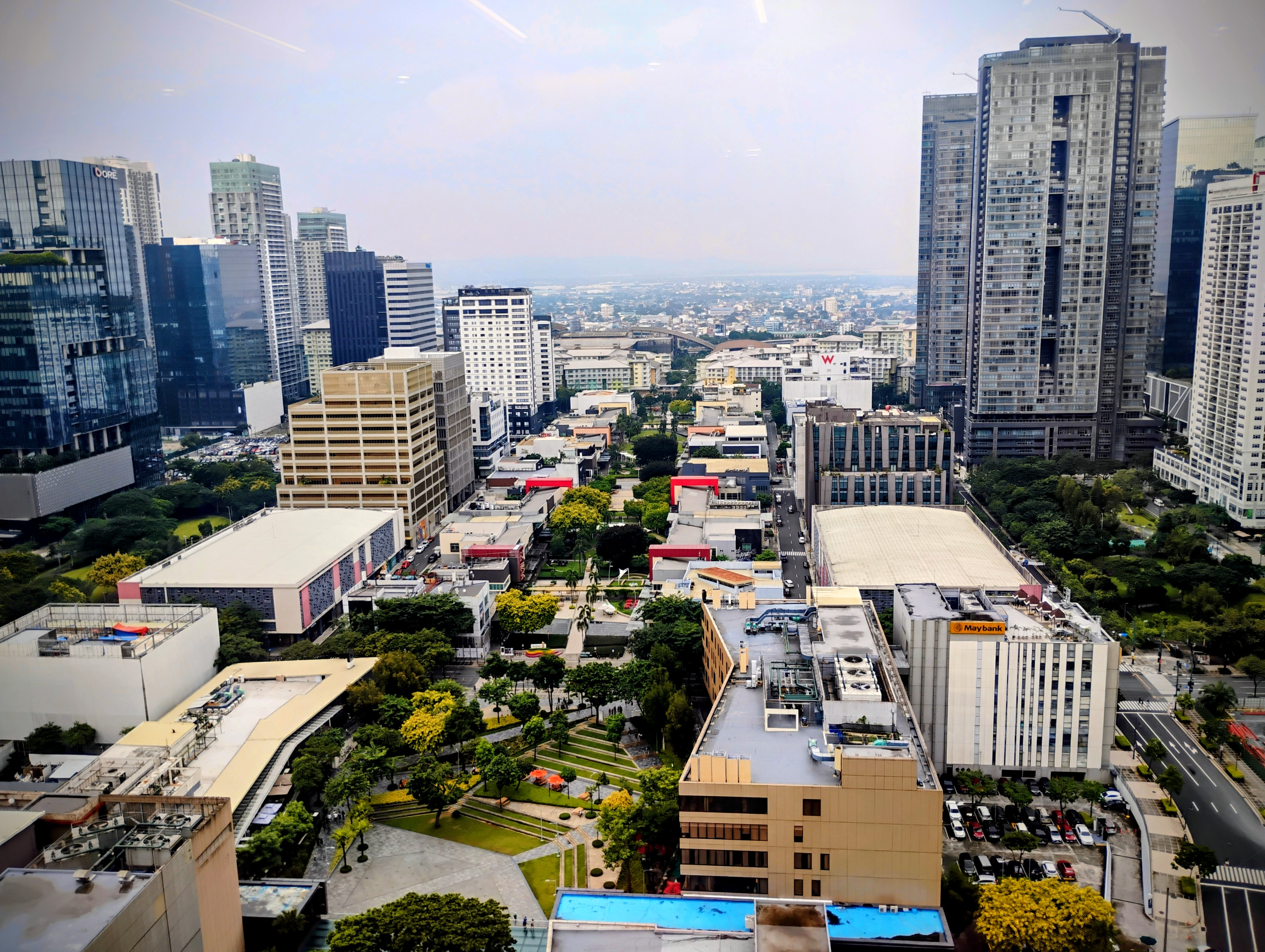
- View of Bonifacio High Street from the Philippine Stock Exchange Tower
- Location: Bonifacio Global City, Taguig, Metro Manila, Philippines
- Coordinates: 14°33′02″N 121°03′05″E
- Opened: High Street: October 2007; 19 years ago; High Street Central: May 2012; 14 years ago; Central Square: June 2014; 12 years ago; Ayala Malls One Bonifacio High Street: August 2018; 8 years ago
- Developer: Ayala Land
- Manager: Ayala Malls
- Owner: Fort Bonifacio Development Corporation
- Public transit: One Parkade: AS09 C08 WR10; AS03 C02 Nutriasia
- Website: Official website

Bonifacio High Street is a mixed-use development in Bonifacio Global City, Taguig, Metro Manila, Philippines located near Serendra, Market! Market! and SM Aura. It is owned by Ayala Malls, a real-estate subsidiary of Ayala Land, which is an affiliate of Ayala Corporation.

The mall offers a mix of high-end retail shops, restaurants, amenities, leisure and entertainment in the Philippines. Currently, the mall has four sections: the first and second blocks are an open-air shopping, the third block is a mixture of open-air and indoor commercial buildings dubbed as the “Bonifacio High Street Central” that also includes state-of-the-art cinemas, and the fourth block named Bonifacio High Street South or simply High Street South is a mixture of open-air and indoor commercial-residential buildings.

As of 2024, it is the 43rd most expensive retail street in the world.

== Features ==
=== Central Square ===
Opened in June 2014, Central Square is an indoor mall developed and operated by the SSI Group, a local specialty retailer of international brands. It contains three retail floors, two basement floors with The Marketplace supermarket, parking spaces, and one cinema floor. The first three retail levels houses brands whose Philippines presence are managed by the SSI Group including Muji, Shake Shack, and Tommy Hilfiger, while the 4th level, which contains four cinemas, is operated by Ayala Malls.

=== One Bonifacio High Street ===
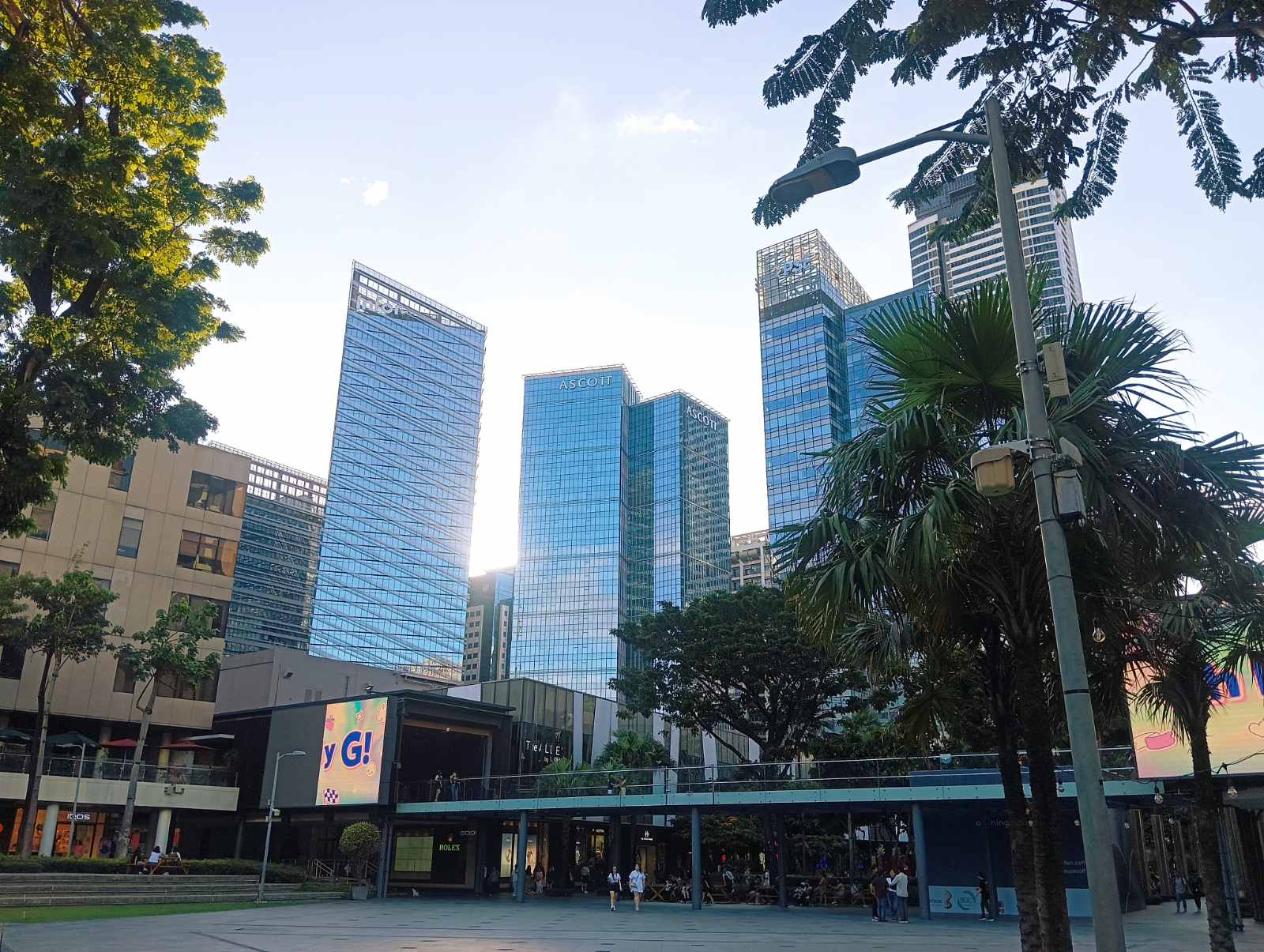
A view of Bonifacio High Street (Central Part)

Opened in August 2018, One Bonifacio High Street is an indoor mall that serves as the podium of the 63-story The Suites at One Bonifacio High Street residential tower and the Philippine Stock Exchange Tower, which opened in February 2018. It is located in front of BHS Central and across Shangri-La at The Fort. The mall has five retail floors, four parking floors, and a gross leasable area of 23,000 square meters (250,000 sq ft). It features a curated food court called Food District at the lower ground level.

=== The Landmark Bonifacio Global City at Three Parkade ===
Opened in October 2021, The Landmark is located at first two levels of Three Parkade, a parking facility adjacent to Central Square. It is the 5th Store opened by The Landmark and is the smallest store. Landmark Supermarket is located on the first level, while Landmark Department Store is on the upper level. The department store features its signature Homeware Section and small Cosmetics Section.

=== Bonifacio High Street South ===
The Bonifacio High Street South is a residential-commercial block which is a part of the bigger Bonifacio High Street Complex. It houses several condominiums namely, The Maridien, Verve Residences, West Gallery Place, and East Gallery Place, similar to the nearby Serendra while facing the Bonifacio High Street Main blocks. The High Street South Corporate Plaza and a series of landscaped parks also comprise the block. It draws big inspiration from boutique districts of New York City, Los Angeles, Toronto, Kuala Lumpur, Singapore, Hong Kong, Tokyo, and Seoul to name a few.

== Gallery ==
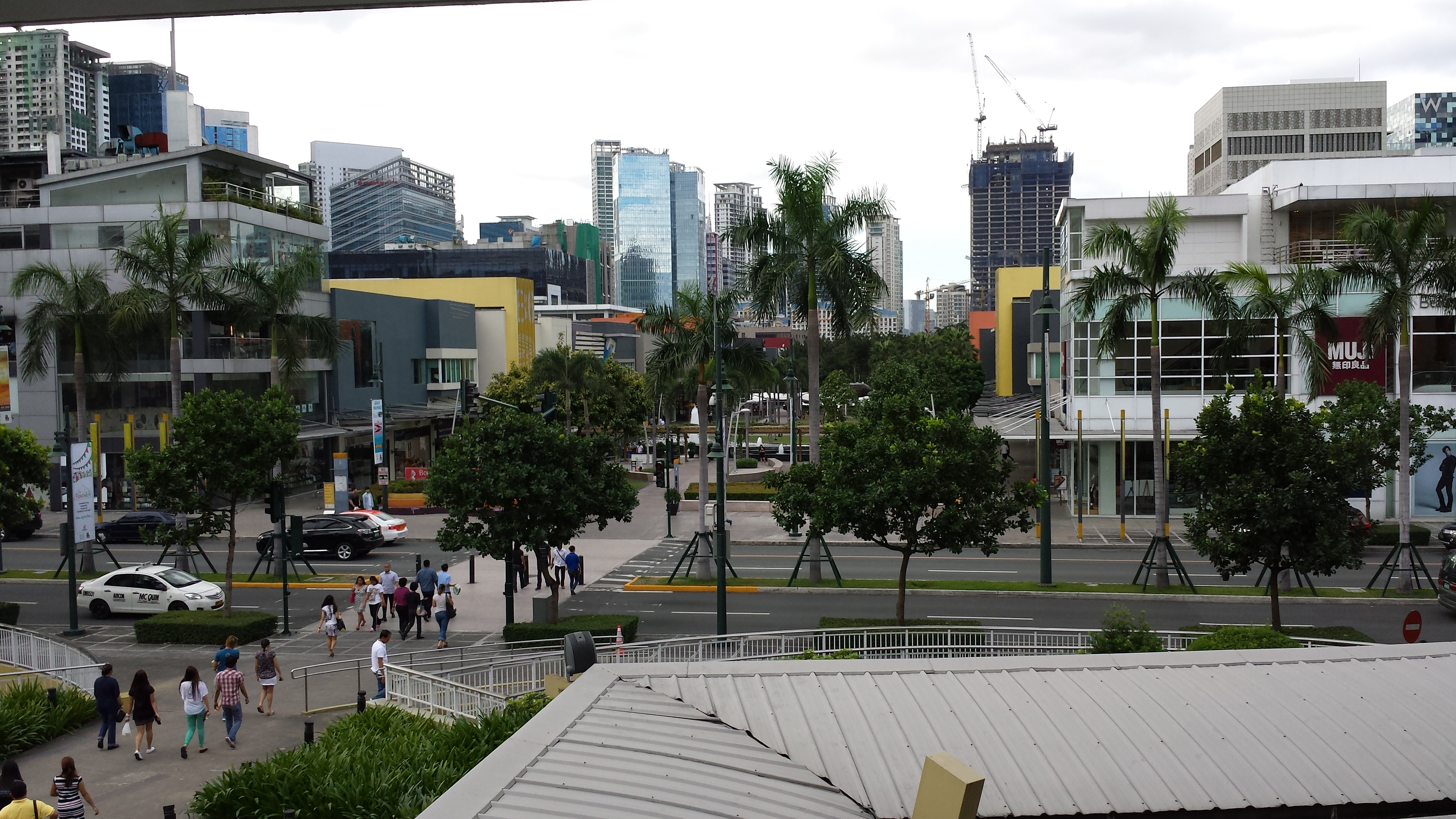
A pedestrian lane at Bonifacio High Street

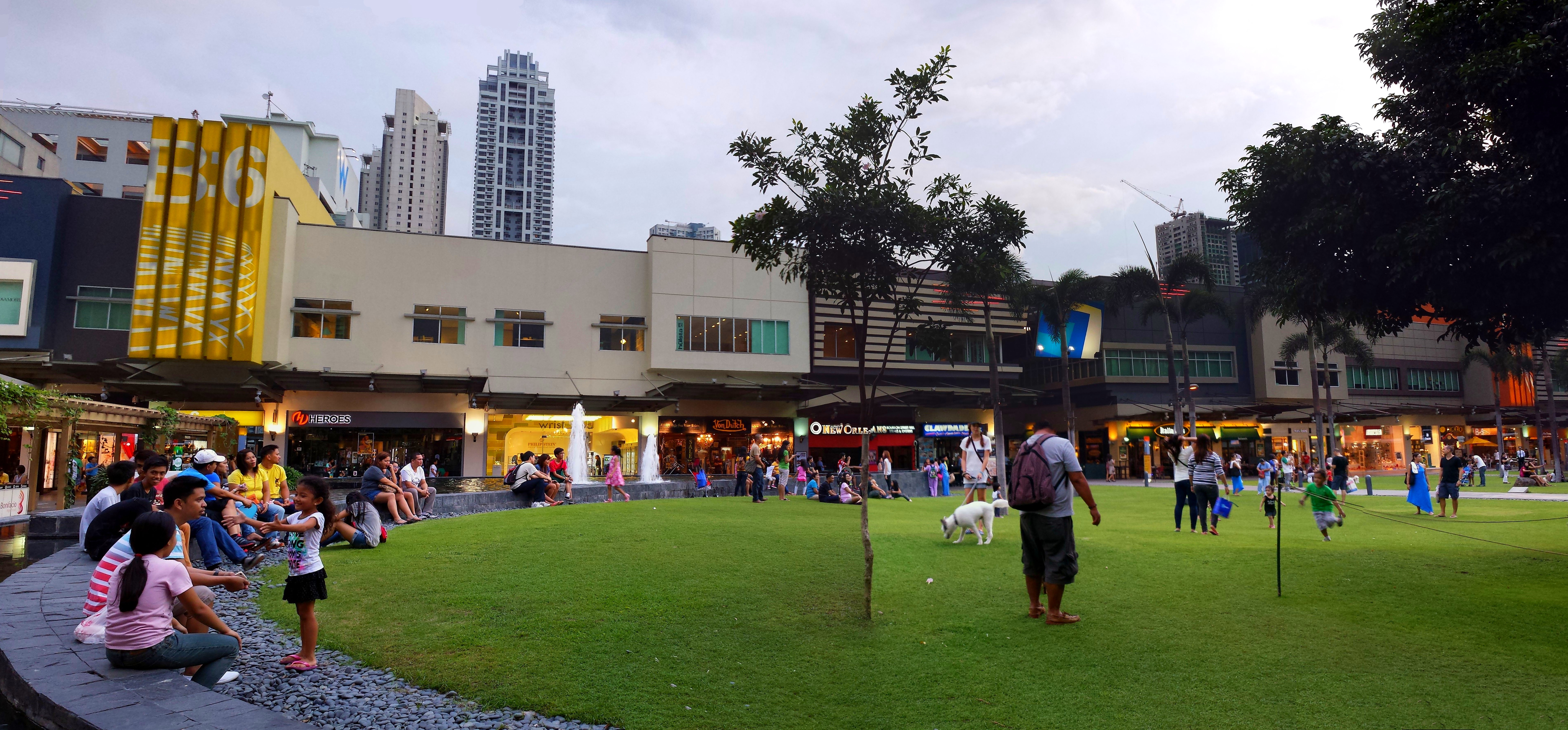
Bonifacio High Street in 2013

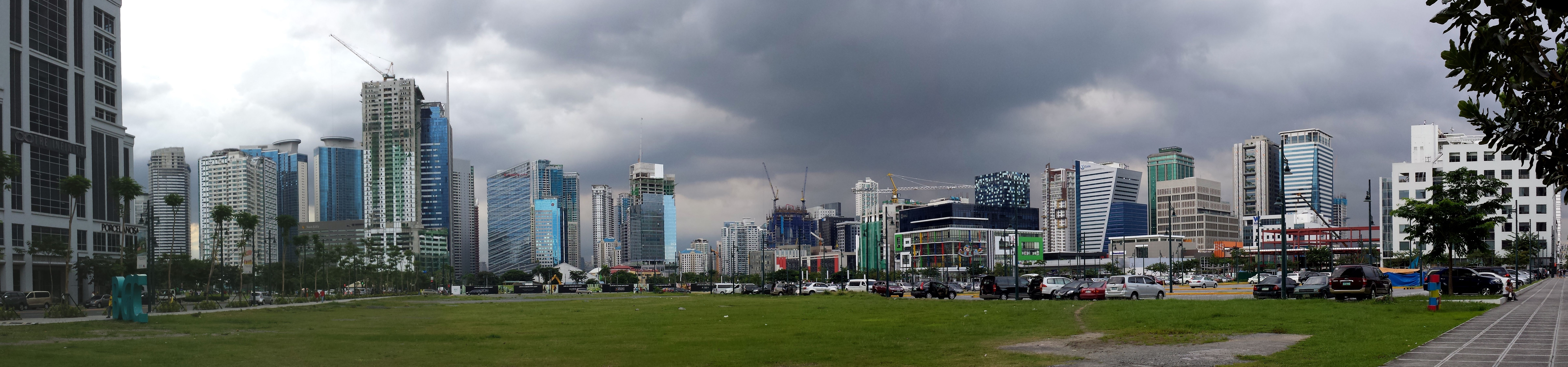
Bonifacio High Street South Block overlooking Bonifacio Global City

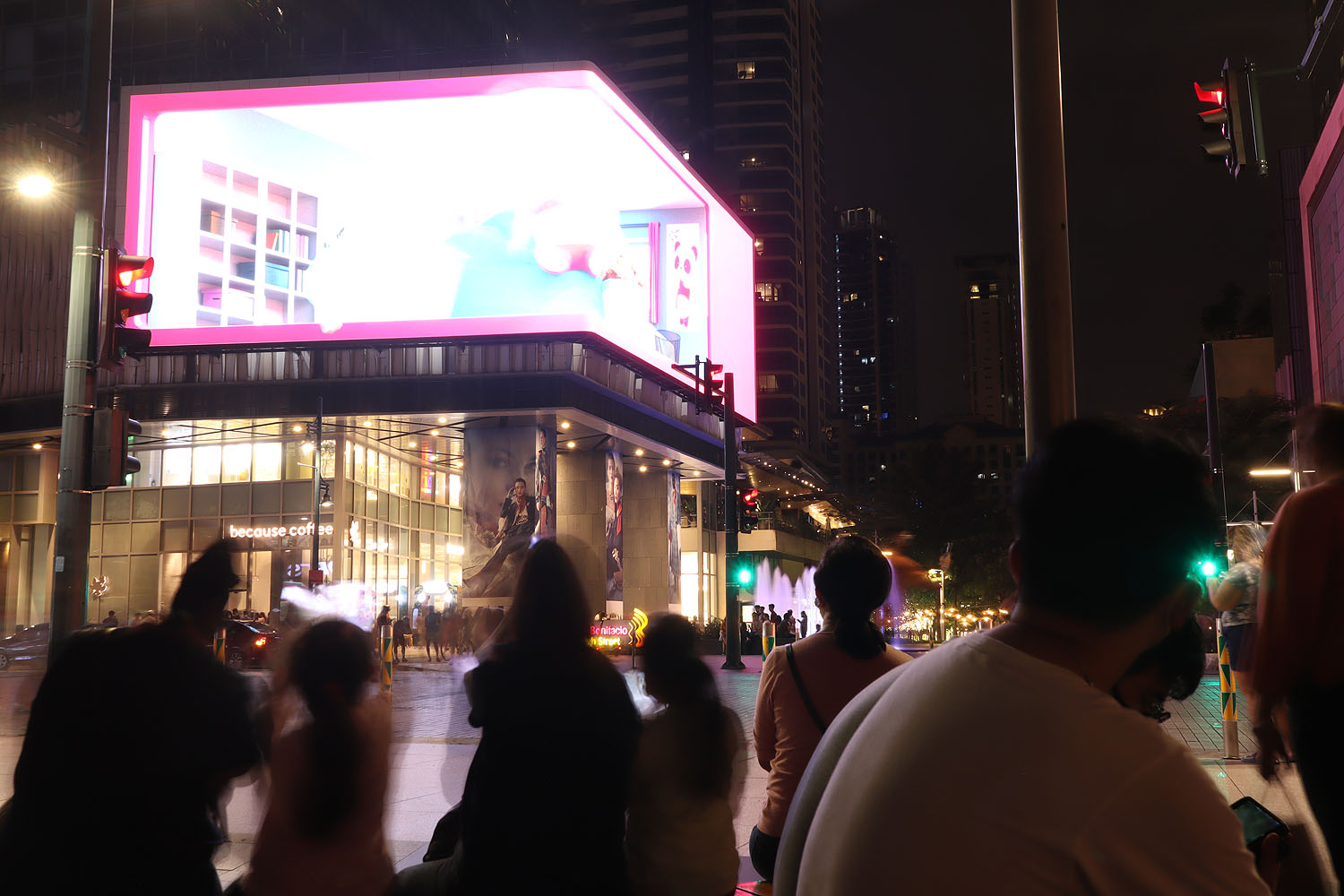
Bonifcaio High Street at night towards the newly installed 3D LED board

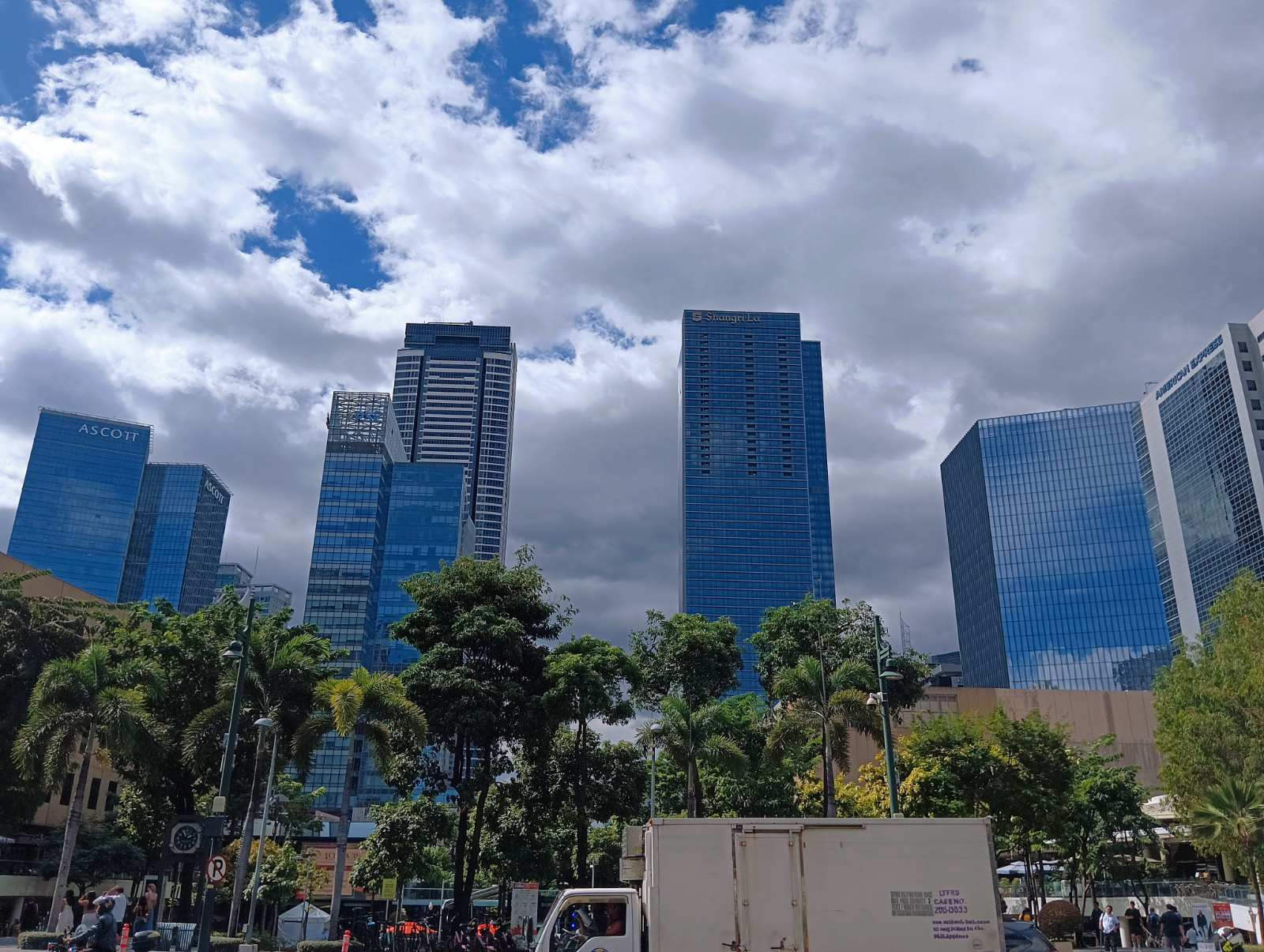
Bonifacio High Street from 7th Avenue

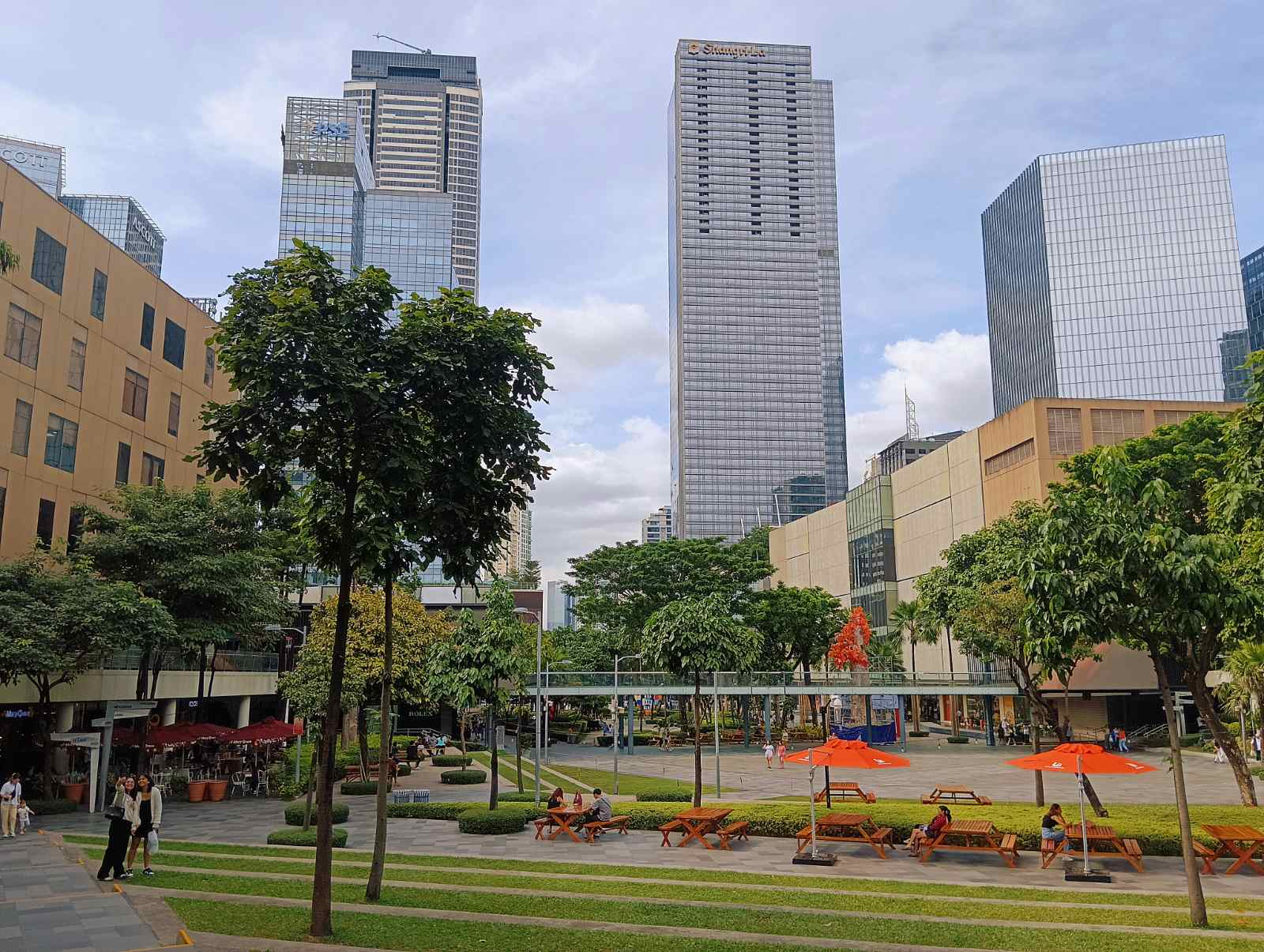
A view of Bonifacio High Street (Central Part)
