= MacKinlay =

MacKinlay is a surname. Notable people with the surname include:

- Andrew MacKinlay (born 1949), British politician
- Andrew MacKinlay (cricketer) (born 1967), South African cricketer
- Andrew MacKinlay (Nova Scotia politician) (1800–1867), Canadian politician
- Craig Mackinlay (born 1966), British politician
- James Mackinlay (1850–1917), English rugby union player
- Jock D. Mackinlay (born 1952), American computer and information scientist
- Leila Mackinlay (1910–1996), British writer of romance novels from 1930 to 1979
- Shane Mackinlay (born 1965), Australian Catholic bishop

== Given name ==
- MacKinlay Kantor (1904–1977), born Benjamin McKinlay Kantor, American journalist, novelist, and screenwriter

== See also ==
- McKinlay
- McKinley
- Mackinlay's cuckoo-dove, (Macropygia mackinlayi)
