= Market! Market! =

Real estate development

- Façade of the mall at McKinley Parkway
- Location: Bonifacio Global City, Fort Bonifacio, Taguig, Philippines
- Coordinates: 14°32′58.5″N 121°03′22.6″E
- Address: McKinley Parkway
- Opened: September 16, 2004; 22 years ago
- Developer: Ayala Land
- Manager: Ayala Malls; Station Square East Commercial Corporation
- Num. of stores: 520+
- Floor area: 170,000 m^{2} (1,800,000 sq ft)
- Floors: 5 upper + 1 basement
- Parking: 8,000 slots (3,500 In Car Park)
- Public transit: Market! Market!: AS02 AS10 C01 EX02 NR11 WR12; 15 16 Market! Market!
- Website: Market! Market! website

Market! Market! (also known as Ayala Malls Market! Market!) is a shopping mall complex developed by Ayala Land, the real estate subsidiary of Ayala Corporation, on a lot leased from Bases Conversion and Development Authority, a government-owned and controlled corporation. It is operated by its subsidiary, Ayala Malls. It is located at McKinley Parkway, Bonifacio Global City, Taguig, Philippines. Groundbreaking was conducted in August 2002 and the mall opened on September 16, 2004. The mall caters to the middle market, unlike other Ayala malls, which cater to the upper socioeconomic class.

In May 2024, the Bases Conversion and Development Authority announced that the mall will be redeveloped as a mixed-use development once the lease expires by the end of 2027. However, the lease was extended for another twelve more years beginning to the year 2027. The purpose is to redevelop the property into a mixed-use development that would also host a station of the Metro Manila Subway.

== Location ==
Market! Market! is located in a 9.7-hectare (24-acre) area across Bonifacio High Street and Serendra. It is situated on the former location of the Gen. Douglas MacArthur Staff House. The mall underwent several major renovations because of market competition with SM Prime Holdings' upscale mall, SM Aura, located just across 26th Street.

== Reception ==
- Maxi Award of Merit (International Council of Shopping Centers, Inc., 2005)
- Finalist, Best Shopping Center of the Year (Philippine Retailer's Association and Department of Trade & Industry, 2006)

== Gallery ==
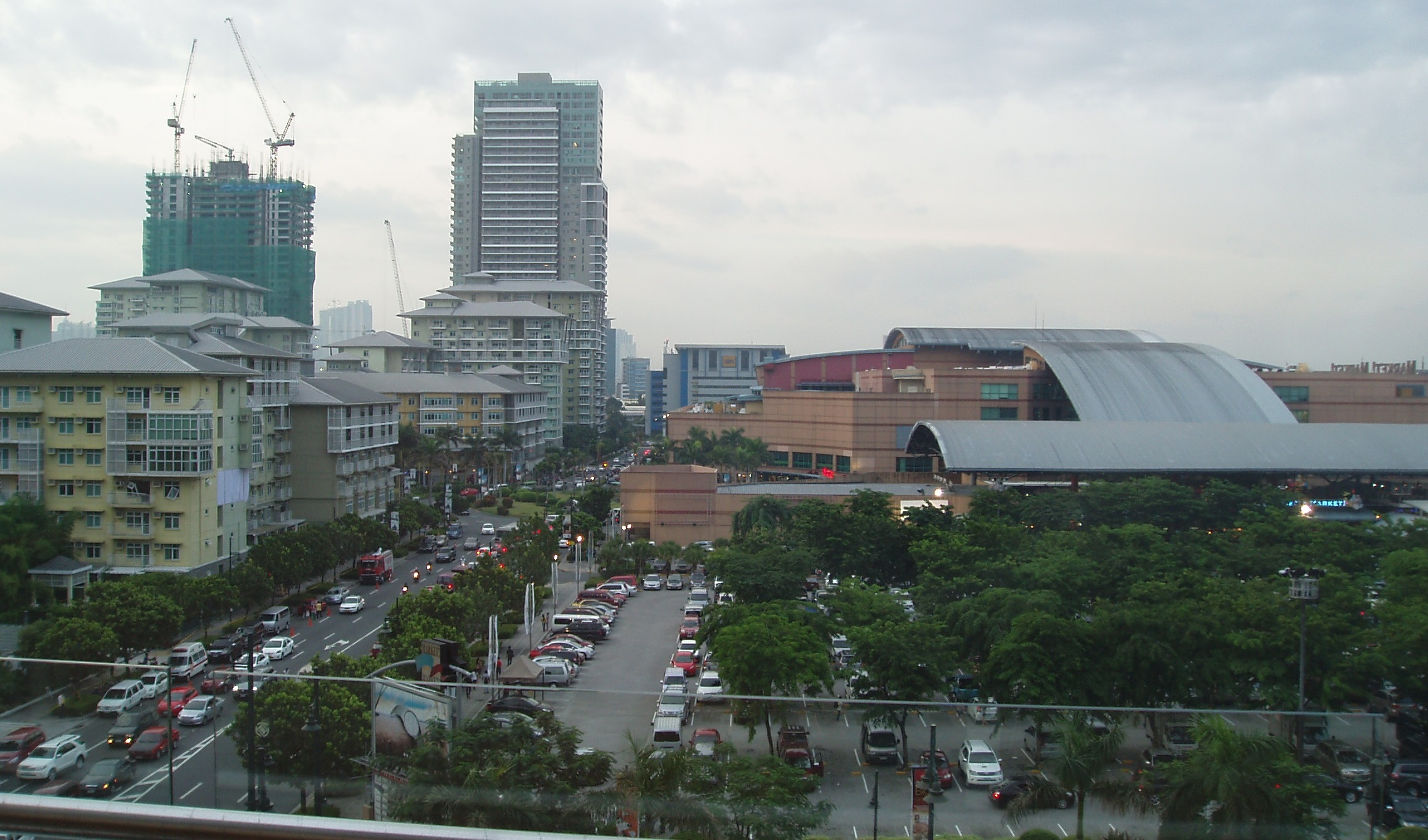
Market! Market! (right) with Two Serendra (left)

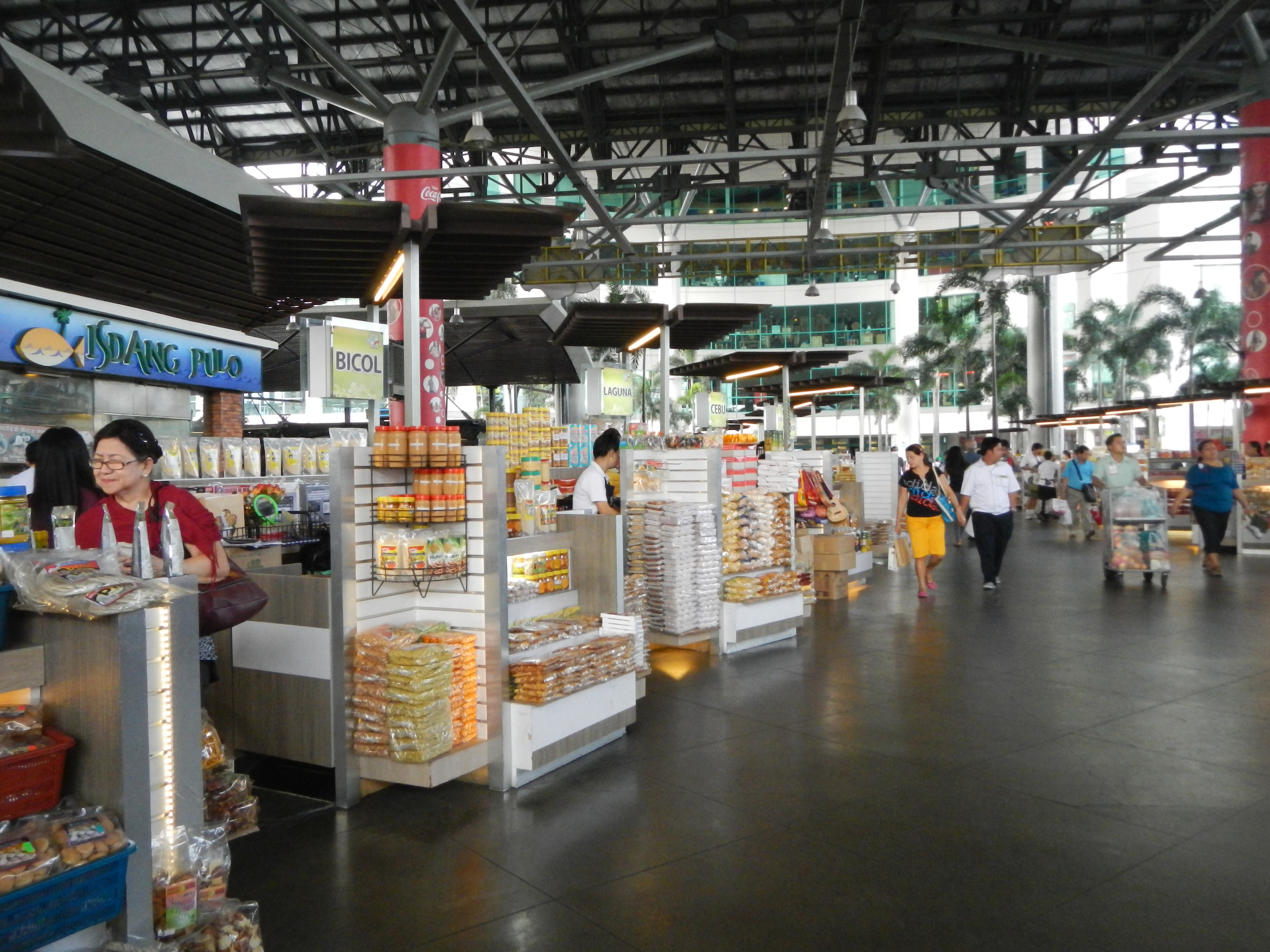
Fiesta Market

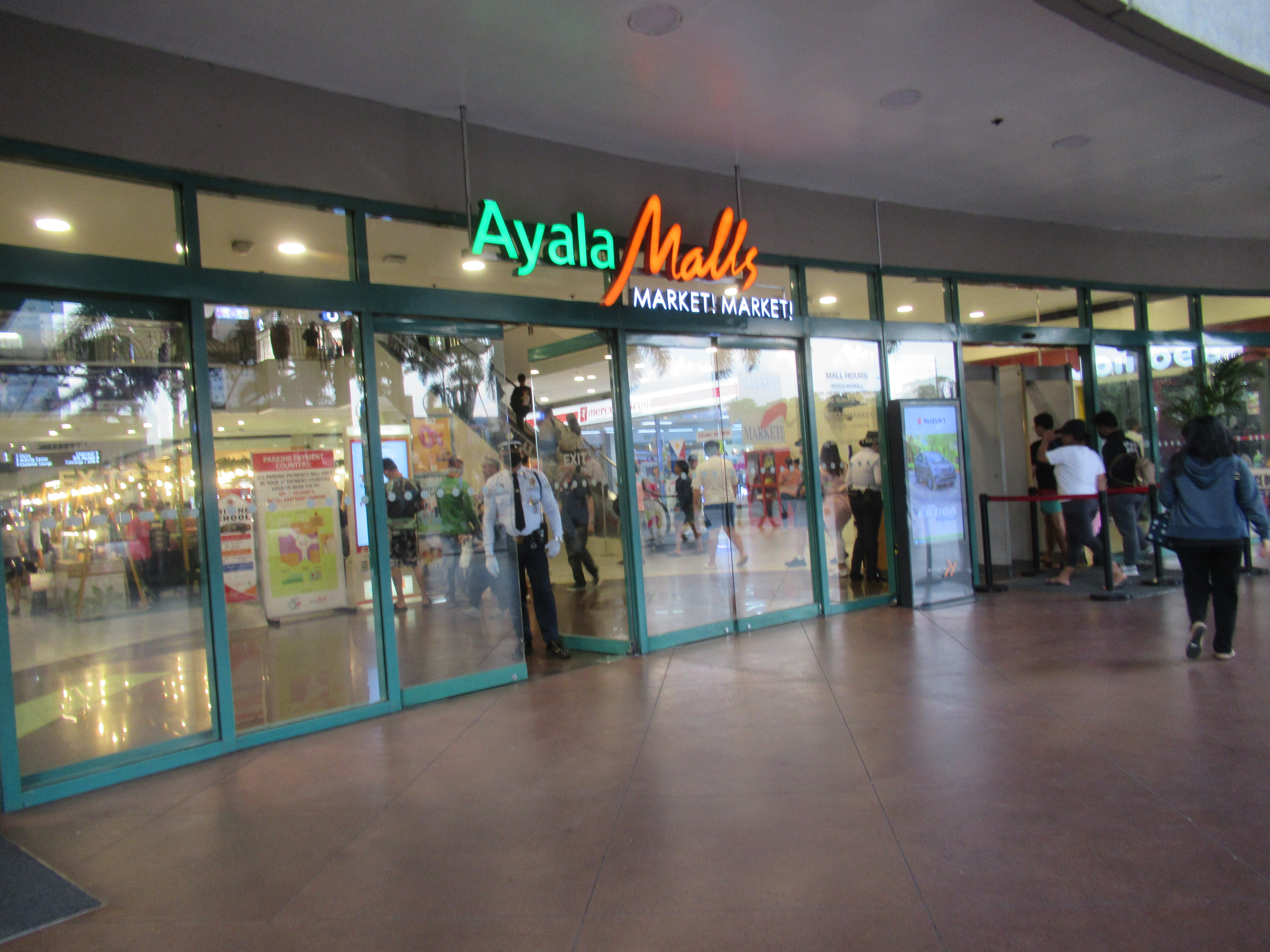
A mall entrance

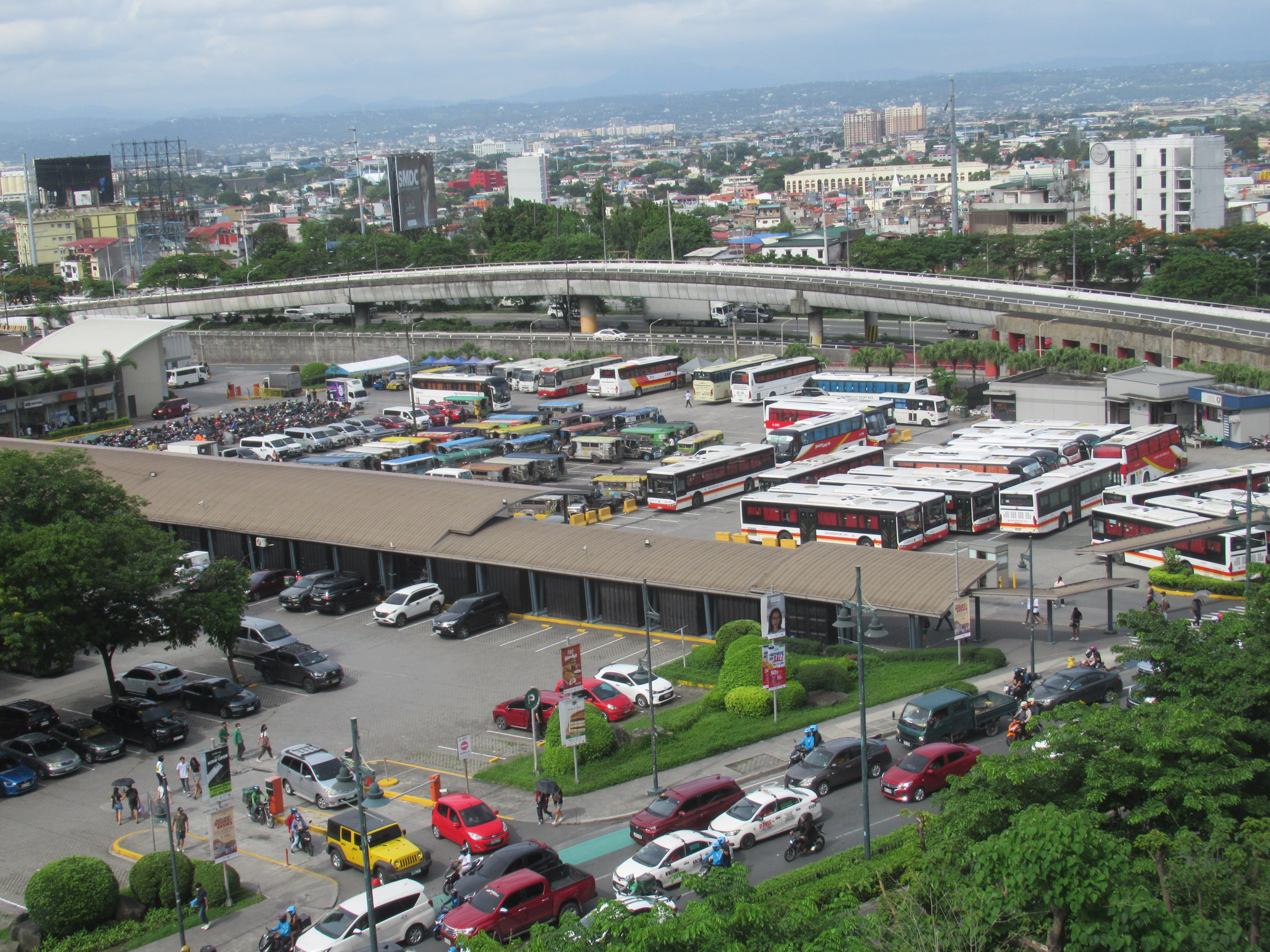
South parking area

Activity center

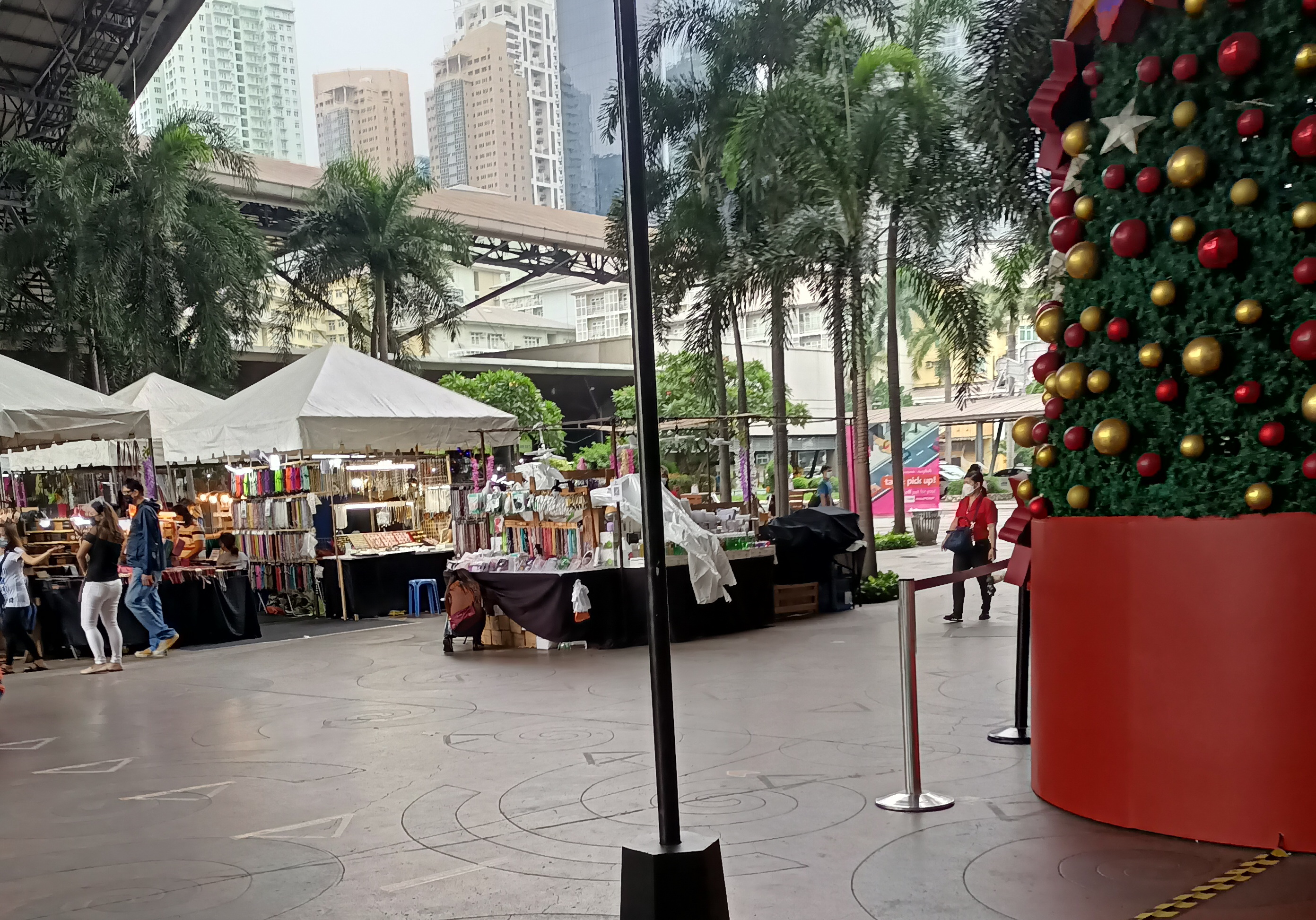
Stalls at the mall's open area during the Christmas season

Transport terminal

== See also ==
- Ayala Corporation
- SM Aura
- List of shopping malls in the Philippines
