= Holiday Inn & Suites Makati =

- Interactive map of the Holiday Inn & Suites Makati area

General information
- Status: Operational
- Type: Hotel
- Location: Makati, Philippines
- Coordinates: 14°33′02″N 121°01′30″E
- Opening: April 1, 2013; 13 years ago
- Owner: Ayala Land

Technical details
- Floor count: 19
- Lifts/elevators: 4

Design and construction
- Main contractor: Makati Development Corporation

Other information
- Number of rooms: 348
- Number of suites: 16
- Number of restaurants: 1
- Number of bars: 2

Holiday Inn & Suites Makati is a hotel in Makati, Metro Manila, Philippines. It opened on April 1, 2013, as part of the New Glorietta Phase 1 redevelopment. The hotel is built on top of a redeveloped Glorietta shopping mall in Ayala Center. The hotel is managed by InterContinental Hotels Group.

Holiday Inn & Suites Makati is InterContinental Hotels Group's second partnership with Ayala Land after InterContinental Manila, which ceased to operate in 2015.

Ayala Land reopened Glorietta 1 on November 5, 2012, while Glorietta 2 was reopened on December 7, 2012. The budget for Phase 1 of the project is ₱20 billion and this phase includes the construction of hotels, offices, and residential development which includes Holiday Inn & Suites Makati.

The hotel has 6 room types: Deluxe, Premier, Executive Club, Corner Suite, Executive Suite, and the Makati Suite. In 2016, the hotel converted its smoking floor into non-smoking which makes all its guest rooms 100% smoke-free.
