= One Ayala =

Mixed-use development in the Philippines

- Façade of One Ayala in December 2022
- Alternative names: One Ayala Avenue
- Hotel chain: Canopy by Hilton

General information
- Location: 1 Ayala Avenue corner EDSA (C-4), Ayala Center, Makati, Philippines
- Coordinates: 14°33′1.692″N 121°1′40.548″E
- Construction started: 2016; 10 years ago
- Opened: East Tower: 2022; West Tower: 2022; Terminal and Mall: July 18, 2022; 4 years ago; South Tower: 2024
- Cost: ₱15 billion
- Owner: Zobel de Ayala family
- Operator: Mall: Ayala Malls; East, West, and South Towers: Ayala Land Offices

Height
- Height: West Tower: 127 m (417 ft); East Tower: 123 m (404 ft)

Technical details
- Floor count: Mall and Terminal: 5 upper + 1 basement (Note: The mall's basement level is labelled as the Lower Ground Level.); Basement Parking: 4 (Note: One Ayala's basement parking levels are labelled as Basements 1 to 4, beneath the mall's Lower Ground Level.); East Tower: 21; West Tower: 29; Canopy by Hilton Makati: 24; South Tower: 19
- Grounds: 2.8 hectares (6.9 acres)

Design and construction
- Architecture firm: Visionarch
- Developer: Makati Development Corporation
- Main contractor: MDBI Construction Corporation

Other information
- Number of stores: 400+ (expected)
- Number of rooms: Canopy by Hilton Makati: 400
- Public transit: Ayala; 1 Ayala Bus Routes: 10 11 12 17 31 38 40 42 45 46 59 One Ayala; 62 63 EDSA-Ayala; BGC Bus: EX01 L01 N01 NR17 NR01 W01 WR01 WR18 EDSA-Ayala; Jeepneys, P2P Buses, Taxis

Website
- www.ayalamalls.com/main/malls/one-ayala-mall (mall)

One Ayala, also known as One Ayala Avenue (OAA), is a mixed-use development developed by Ayala Land located at Ayala Center via Ayala Avenue and EDSA (C-4) in Makati, Metro Manila, Philippines. It is located across Glorietta and SM Makati malls. It combines retail (an Ayala Mall), transportation hub, an exhibition center (SPACE at One Ayala), a hotel (Canopy by Hilton Makati), and three office buildings (West, East, and South Towers) in a single contiguous space. Construction began in 2016 with the demolition of InterContinental Manila and EDSA Carpark on its site, and parts of the development opened in 2022.

== History ==
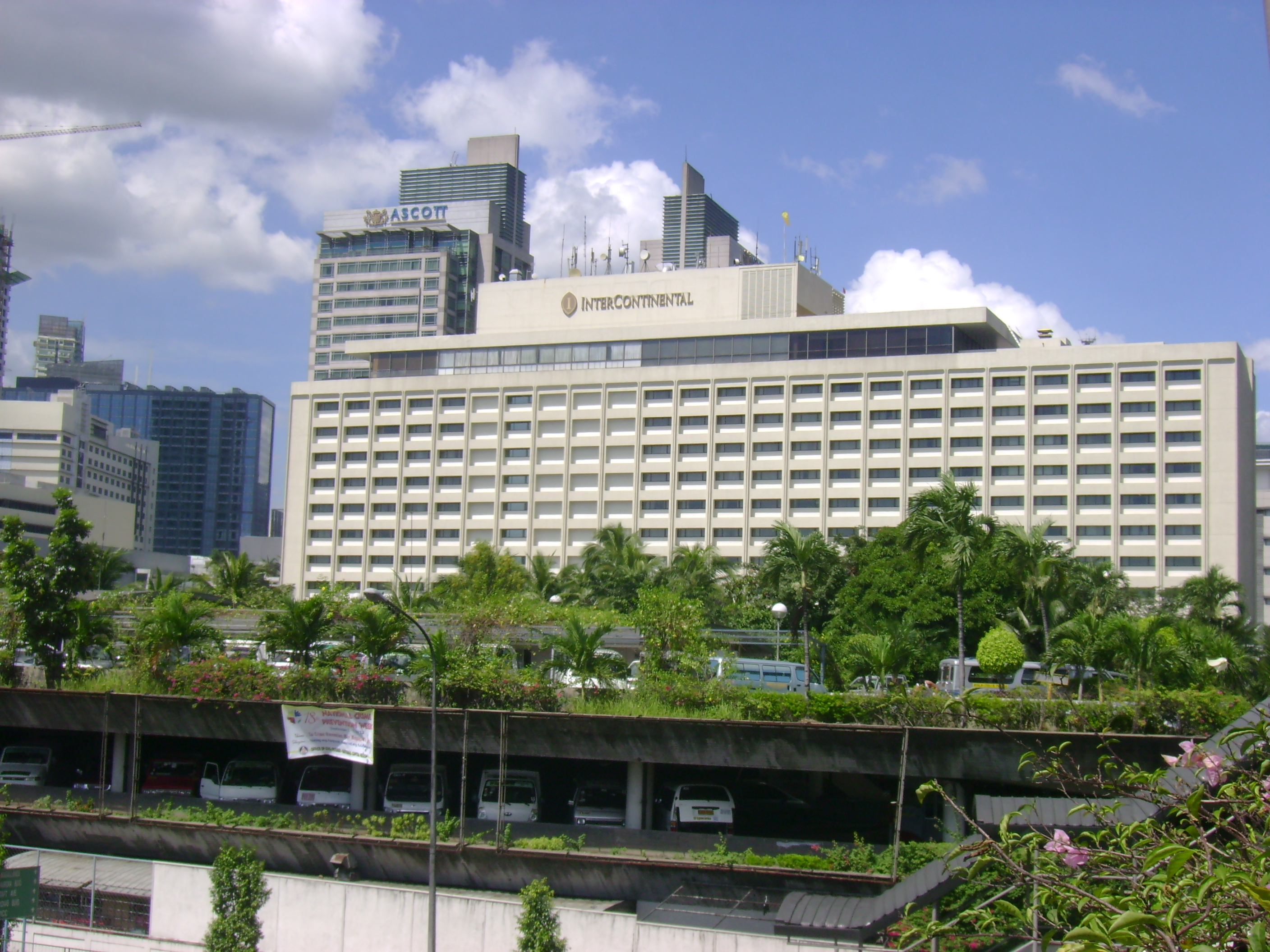
InterContinental Manila and EDSA Carpark in 2012

One Ayala occupies the site where the InterContinental Manila hotel and EDSA Carpark once stood, as well as the northern segment of Station Road. The hotel was planned to close around 2014, coinciding with publicized plans to replace both the hotel and carpark with a mixed-use project, initially planned as a residential development. It was envisioned as part of Ayala Land's ₱65-billion redevelopment of the Makati Central Business District. The hotel would cease operations on December 31, 2015, and was later demolished.

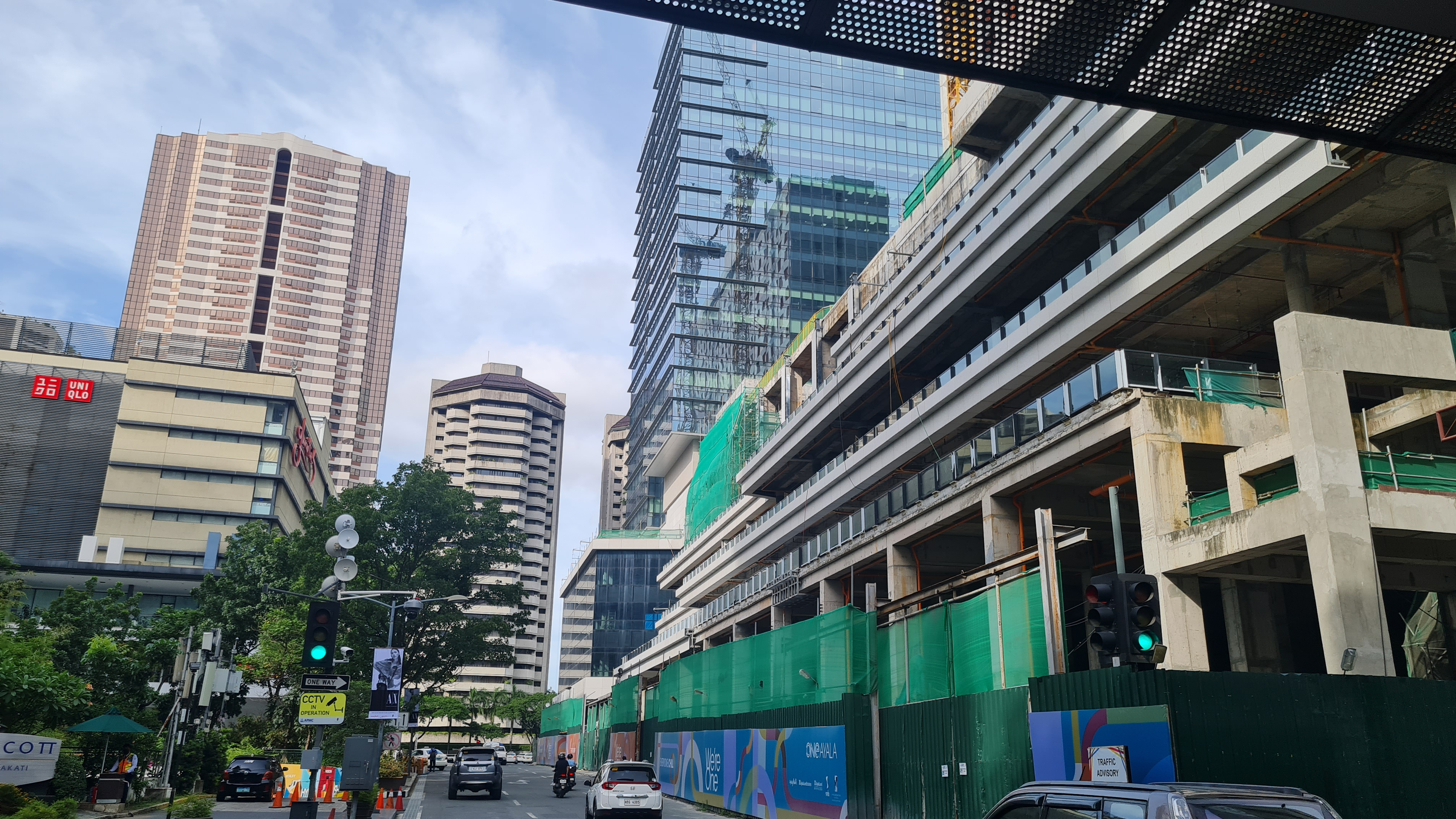
One Ayala (right) under construction in 2022

The mixed-use development would be named after its address 1 Ayala Avenue. It was initially planned to feature two office towers, a condominium building (later known as One Ayala Residences), a hotel (initially Seda One Ayala, a flagship branch of Seda Hotels), and a shopping mall with intermodal transportation hub and an exhibition center, seamlessly integrating to existing developments within the area. Its construction began in 2016, led by MDBI Construction Corporation, a Makati Development Corporation (MDC) subsidiary, which in turn is a subsidiary of Ayala Land. The office towers, Towers 1 and 2 (now East and West Towers, respectively), began its construction in June 2017. On March 16, 2020, a fire broke out at the seventh level of Tower 1 and was extinguished after the first alarm, 36 minutes later. Concreting works at the office towers concluded in November 2020 and February 2021, respectively, with Tower 1 topping off in December 2021. In the early 2020s, the concourse-level retail area of the adjacent Ayala MRT station, which opened in 2000, underwent renovation for integration with One Ayala.

The Point-to-Point (P2P) bus terminal and the mall opened on July 18, 2022, with the mall's retail levels opening gradually thereafter. The relocated southbound EDSA Carousel stop and additional bus bays were later opened on November 19, 2022, and were followed by the opening of the access to the Ayala MRT station on December 1, 2022, and the PUV terminal at the lower ground level on March 20, 2023, completing the One Ayala Terminal. Basement 1 parking and Robinsons Supermarket's 150th branch, also the first in Makati, were opened on August 3, 2023. Parking fees for the mall were initially waived every weekend until April 2024. The complex's access to SM Makati opened in December 2023, followed by the access to Glorietta 5 on June 7, 2025.

Logo with Ayala Malls branding (2026–present)

On April 19, 2024, SPACE at One Ayala hosted its first event. In that same year, One Ayala South Tower, the complex's third office tower, was opened, superseding the cancelled One Ayala Residences. On August 5, 2025, Hilton Worldwide Holdings Inc. and Ayala Land Hospitality signed an agreement to open Canopy by Hilton Makati, the hotel chain's first branch in the Philippines, at One Ayala by 2026, replacing the cancelled Seda One Ayala.

== Features ==
One Ayala, named after its address 1 Ayala Avenue, is a 390,000 m^{2} (4,200,000 sq ft) transport-oriented development which features a five-story 54,700 m^{2} (589,000 sq ft) mall with intermodal transportation hub, trade halls, three office towers, and a hotel. It is designed by the architectural firm Visionarch. The lot it occupies measures 2.8 hectares (6.9 acres) and is bounded by Ayala Avenue, EDSA, the inner streets of Ayala Center such as East Street and Courtyard Drive, and the pedestrianized access to Ayala station.

=== Mall and transport hub ===
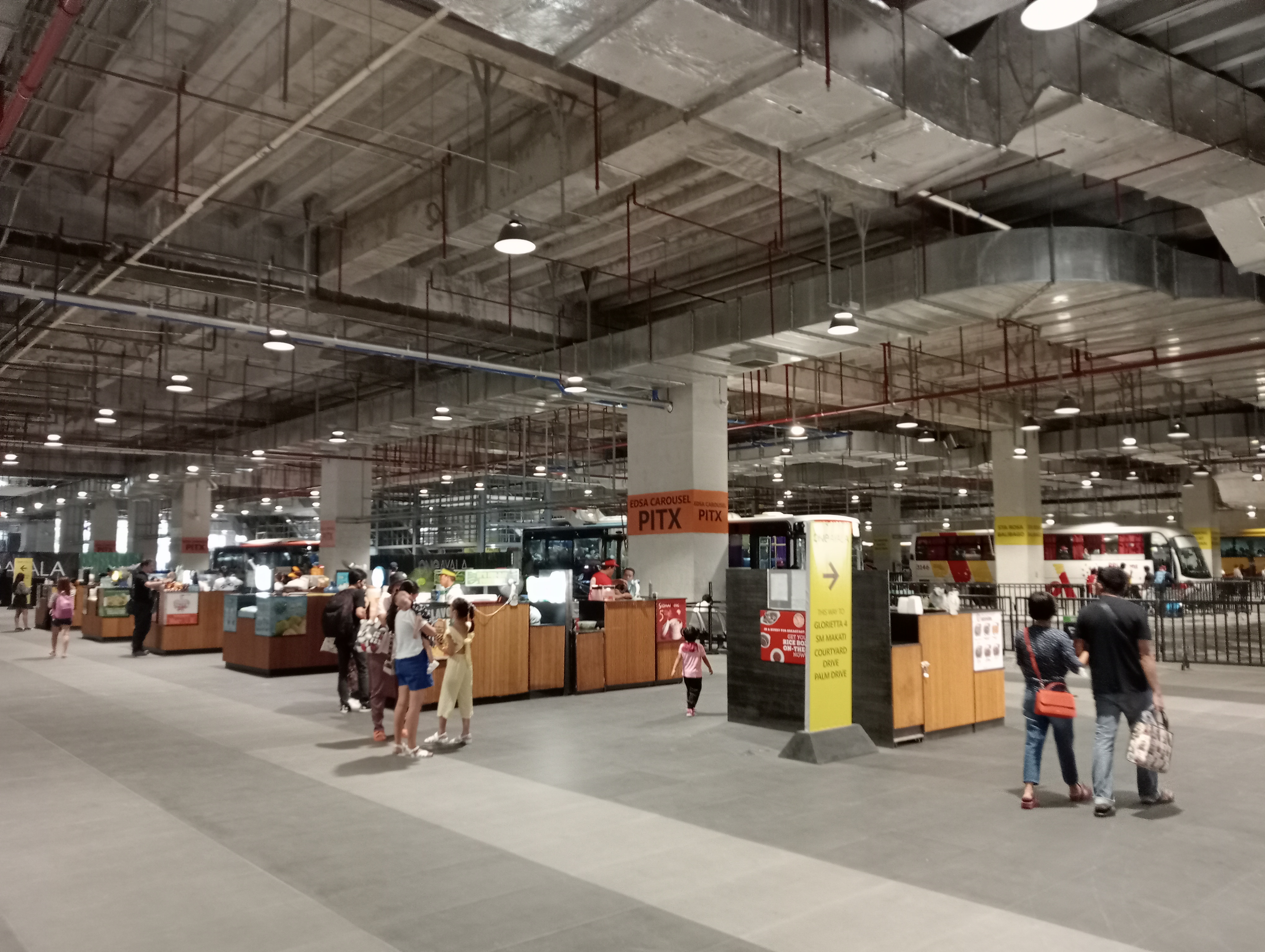
One Ayala Terminal bus stops at the upper ground level

The intermodal transportation hub, known as One Ayala Terminal, spans from the Upper Ground Level to Level 2 of the complex, covering an area of 390,000 m^{2} (4,200,000 sq ft). It is accredited by the Land Transportation Franchising and Regulatory Board (LTFRB).

On the Upper Ground Level are the bus bays of city, provincial, and point-to-point (P2P) buses. EDSA provides access to three bus bays for southbound buses of the EDSA Carousel, other city and provincial buses mostly southbound, and some P2P buses. On the other hand, Ayala Avenue provides access to the P2P Carousel Lane for most P2P buses, a pick-up and drop-off point, and an Electric Vehicle (EV) Fast-Charging station. Tripko and Beep contactless smart card reloading stations, food kiosks, and a friendship mural are also located on this level.

On the Lower Ground Level is the PUV terminal, which features nine gates for traditional jeepneys and UV Express routes coming from Ayala Center. It is accessible via Ayala Avenue, with a vehicular exit at Courtyard and Station Drives.

On Level 2 are the pedestrian access points to Ayala station of the MRT Line 3 (MRT-3), the Ayala Footbridge (connecting the complex to McKinley Exchange Corporate Center and McKinley Road), Glorietta 5, and SM Makati, which is also accessible from Level 3. The retail area on the concourse of Ayala station is also integrated with the mall.

One Ayala Terminal services (as of October 2026) (Note: References:)
- Premium Point-to-Point Bus Services to and from: SM City Masinag in Antipolo, NOMO – A Vista Lifestyle Center and SOMO – A Vista Mall in Bacoor, Sierra Valley in Cainta, Calamba Crossing, Circuit Makati, Ayala Malls Vermosa in Imus, Noveleta, Robinsons Las Piñas, Fairview Terraces, U.P. Town Center, and Nuvali Transport Terminal in Santa Rosa
- Intercity bus lines to and from: Old Biñan City Proper, Southwoods Mall, Mendez, Trece Martires, Ternate, Alabang, PITX (via EDSA Carousel), Pacita Complex in San Pedro, Balibago in Santa Rosa, FTI-Arca South, Malanday, Robinsons Novaliches, and Cabuyao
- Provincial bus lines to and from: Baguio, Lipa, Lucena, and Santa Cruz
- Provincial bus line to: Batangas City
- Traditional jeepneys operate to and from: Libertad in Pasay and Washington Street in Pio del Pilar
- Electric public utility vehicles operate to and from: Guadalupe (via Century City Mall), Singkamas (Puregold Makati via Makati Loop), and Mandaluyong City Hall
- UV Express operate to and from: Antipolo City Proper, Molino, Pacita Complex in San Pedro, Southwoods Mall, Imus, BF Resort Village in Las Piñas, Marikina Heights, Concepcion Dos in Marikina, BF Homes Parañaque, Moonwalk, Evacom Plaza along Sucat Road, Arca South, and Tuktukan

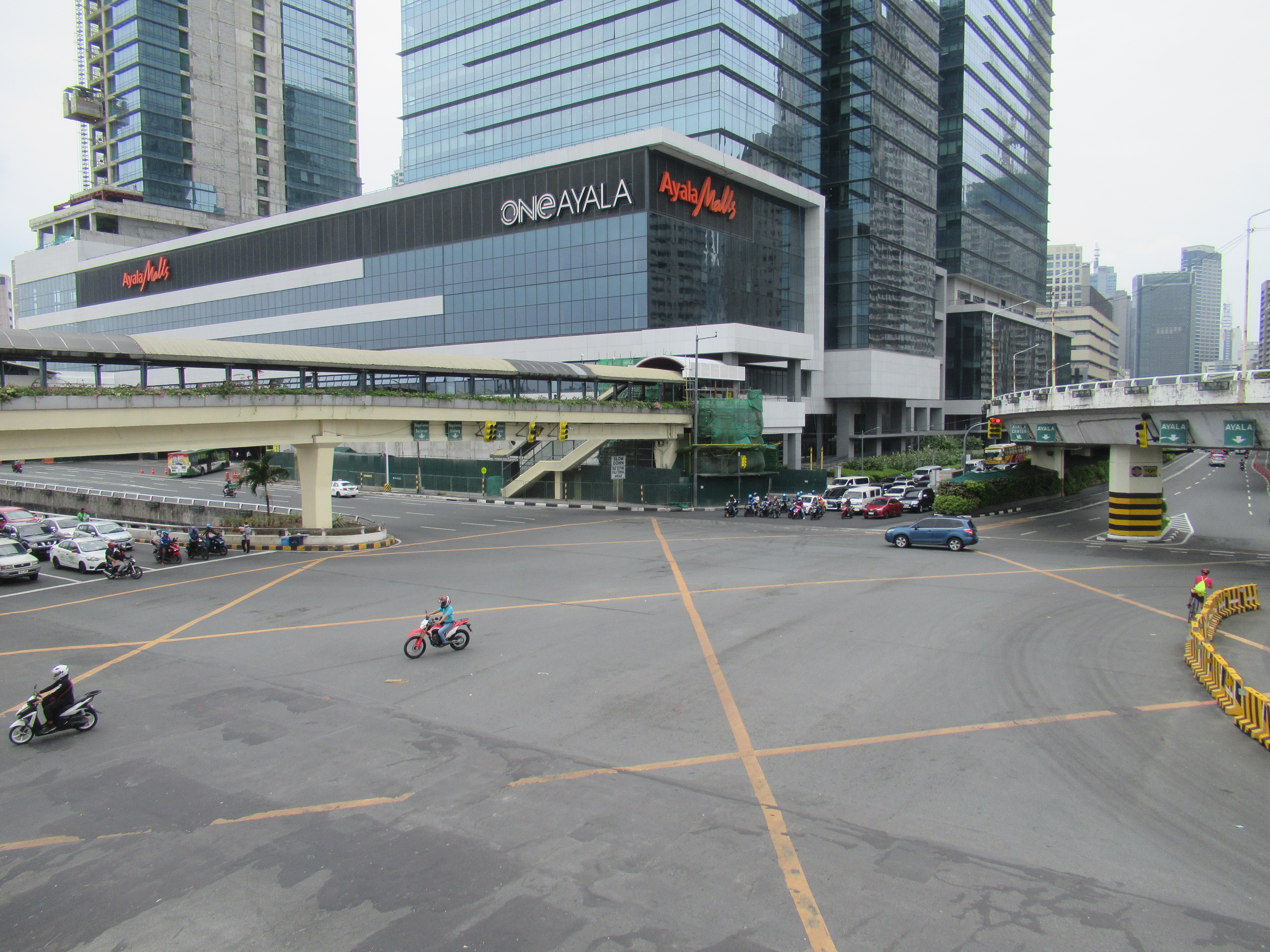
Façade of the mall

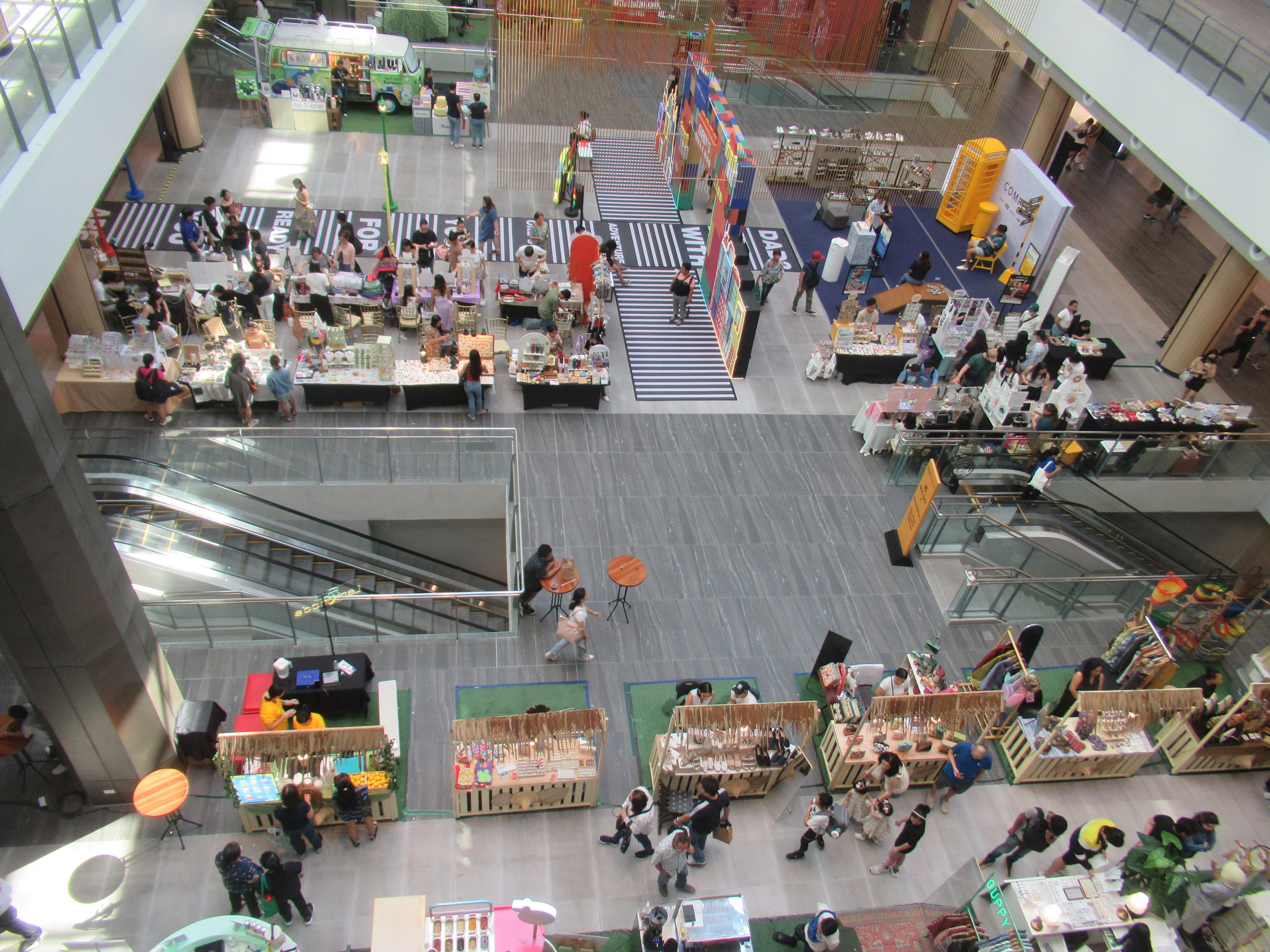
A shot of the concourse during an event

The transport hub is located within a five-story shopping mall, known as Ayala Malls One Ayala or One Ayala by Ayala Malls, that is managed by Ayala Malls. Built at the podium of the complex, the mall has a gross leasable space (GLA) of 54,700 m^{2} (589,000 sq ft) and is expected to house more than 400 retail stores. It features a Robinsons Supermarket branch and Service Avenue (one-stop hub for essential services) at the Lower Ground Level, a concourse for events at Level 2, Tech Central (featuring electronics and digital accessory retailers) at Level 4, and al fresco dining from Levels 2 to 4. Level 5 is the location of SPACE at One Ayala and the headquarters of Ayala Malls.

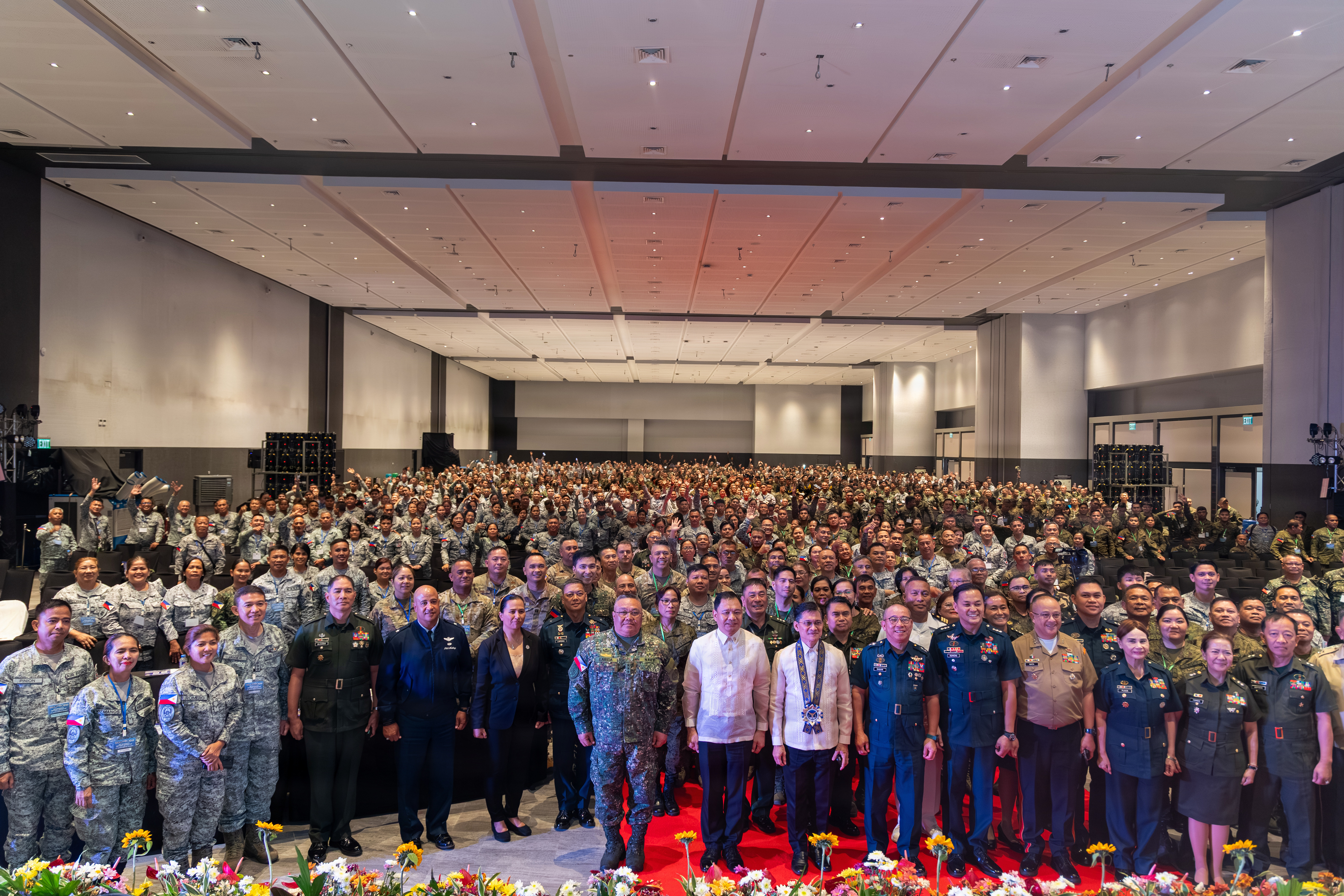
SPACE at One Ayala during the 2nd ARRAPI National Convention in December 2025

SPACE at One Ayala has four trade halls and six function rooms. It is also the first venue under the SPACE brand.

In addition, the mall is equipped with other environmental features such as all-LED lighting, fresh air ducts, and multi-gas testing devices.

=== Office towers ===
One Ayala has three office towers, collectively known as the One Ayala BPO Towers or One Ayala Avenue Corporate Center. All towers are PEZA-registered and developed by Ayala Land Offices.

One Ayala East Tower, sometimes known as One Ayala Tower 1 and OAA BPO Tower 1, has 29 floors. Situated closer to EDSA, It notably hosts the Makati office of Optum Global Solutions Philippines.

One Ayala West Tower, sometimes known as One Ayala Tower 2 and OAA BPO Tower 2, has 21floors. It notably hosts the Philippine headquarters of Microsoft, which moved from 6750 Ayala Avenue in 2022, Both East and West Towers are situated at the Ayala Avenue side of the development, with a combined space of 85,000 m^{2} (910,000 sq ft) and a total GLA of 70,995 m^{2} (764,180 sq ft).

One Ayala South Tower is located at the Courtyard Drive side of the development and has 19 floors with a GLA of 12,000 or 13,230.4 m^{2} (129,167 or 142,411 sq ft). It was opened in 2024.

=== Canopy by Hilton Makati ===
One Ayala will host the Canopy by Hilton Makati, the first Canopy by Hilton hotel in the Philippines. The hotel will feature 400 rooms, a destination restaurant, a rooftop bar, and a speakeasy. It is set to open in 2026. It will occupy a dedicated 24-story building at the East Street side of the development, which was previously held by Seda One Ayala, the cancelled flagship project of Seda Hotels.

=== Parking ===
One Ayala has a four-level basement parking beneath the mall. It is accessible through two entry points coming from Ayala Avenue and East Street, which also provides access to Glorietta's basement parking. Parking spaces for the mall are located at Basements 1 and 2, while those for the office towers are at Basements 3 and 4.

== Sports ==
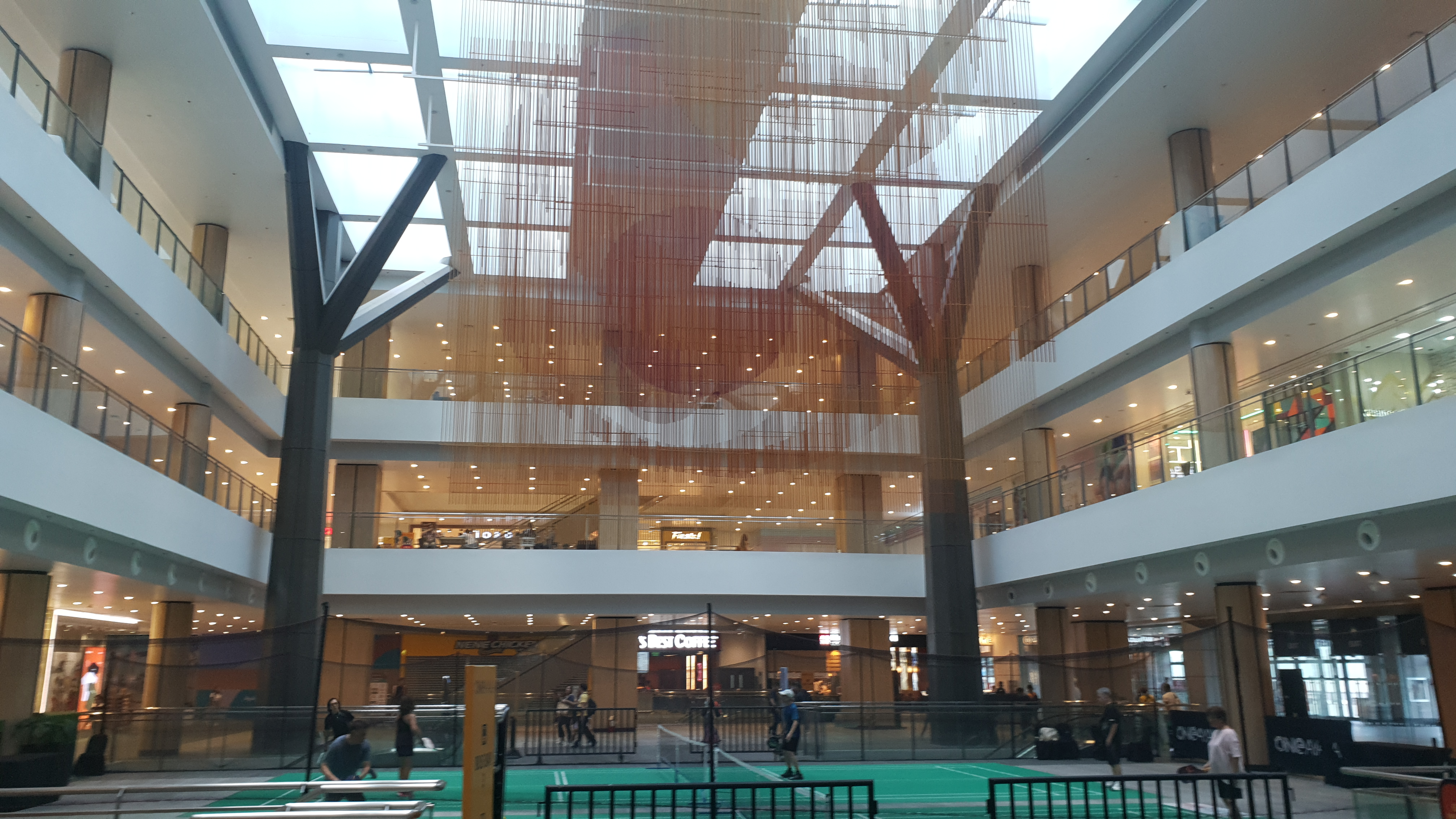
Pickleball courts at the concourse and atrium

One Ayala is also a known sports destination, with facilities such as the One Ayala Pickleball Club and the One Ayala Table Tennis Academy. The One Ayala Pickleball Club offers daily open play sessions and weekend clinics. Makeshift pickleball courts are occasionally set up at the Level 2 concourse and the PUV terminal, the latter of which was previously a permanent court until the club relocated to Activate One on Level 5 on March 1, 2025. On the other hand, the One Ayala Table Tennis Academy provides unlimited play, VIP rentals, and private coaching, mainly at its makeshift table tennis facility at the PUV terminal.

== Awards ==
In 2017, One Ayala was shortlisted out of 400 entries from 68 countries at the 2017 World Architecture Festival. The project of One Ayala Towers 1 and 2 (now One Ayala East Tower and One Ayala West Tower, respectively) won the High-Rise Structures Category in the 2022 Philippines Excellence in Concrete Construction Awards. It also won the 2022 People's Choice Award at the 8th Annual American Concrete Institute (ACI) Excellence in Concrete Construction Awards. The project was nominated by the ACI Philippines Chapter and entered in the high-rise structures category.

In 2023, One Ayala Towers 1 and 2 were awarded as Best Office Development in the Philippines in the Asia Pacific segment of the International Property Awards 2023.

In 2024, Ayala Malls earned the ESG Initiative of the Year – Philippines award at the Retail Asia Awards for the success of Ayala Malls One Ayala.

== See also ==
- Ayala Corporation
- Ayala Center
- Makati Central Business District
- List of shopping malls in Metro Manila
