= Chimara Feel Good Kitchen =

Health food restaurant in the Philippines

Chimara Feel Good Kitchen (K-aɪ-mɑ:-rɑ:) is a health food restaurant in the Philippines. It is the sister company of the popcorn brand Taters.

== History ==
The food outlet started as Chimara Neo-Vegan Café in July 2002. It was initially registered with the Philippine Department of Trade and Industry (DTI) as a sole proprietorship of its founder, Ana Maria C. Tanchanco. It was incorporated with the Securities and Exchange Commission (SEC) in January 2005 as a 100% family-owned, Filipino corporation.

In 2016, Chimara rebranded itself as Chimara Feel Good Kitchen, opening its new branch at U.P. Town Center, Diliman, Quezon City where both branches serve new and improved Healthy Feel Good meals.

== Structure and Operations ==
Chimara is under the company Taters Enterprise Inc., owned by Ana Maria C. Tanchanco as a family-owned, Filipino corporation.

== Franchises ==
Chimara has two existing Philippine brands in Greenbelt 3, Ayala Center Makati, and in U.P. Town Center, Diliman, Quezon City.

== Charitable Contributions ==
Chimara donates a percentage of its proceeds to CENTEX, a non-profit organization that aims to give bright young minds from disadvantaged families the quality education they deserve.

== Products ==
Chimara Feel Good Kitchen offers four menu categories.

Cold and Fresh, are varieties of meals of tofu, chicken, faux beef, and tuna that can be served as a salad or a wrap.

Hot and Savory, are variations of meals of tofu, chicken, faux beef, and tuna that can be served as a rice, pasta and Panini sandwich.

Feel Good Drinks are the beverage choices that were blended from their Alkaline lemonade base to vegetables and fruit ingredients.

Munchies, are selection of snacks with health benefits.
