= Ayala Center =

- Logo since 2010, after a major rebranding scheme

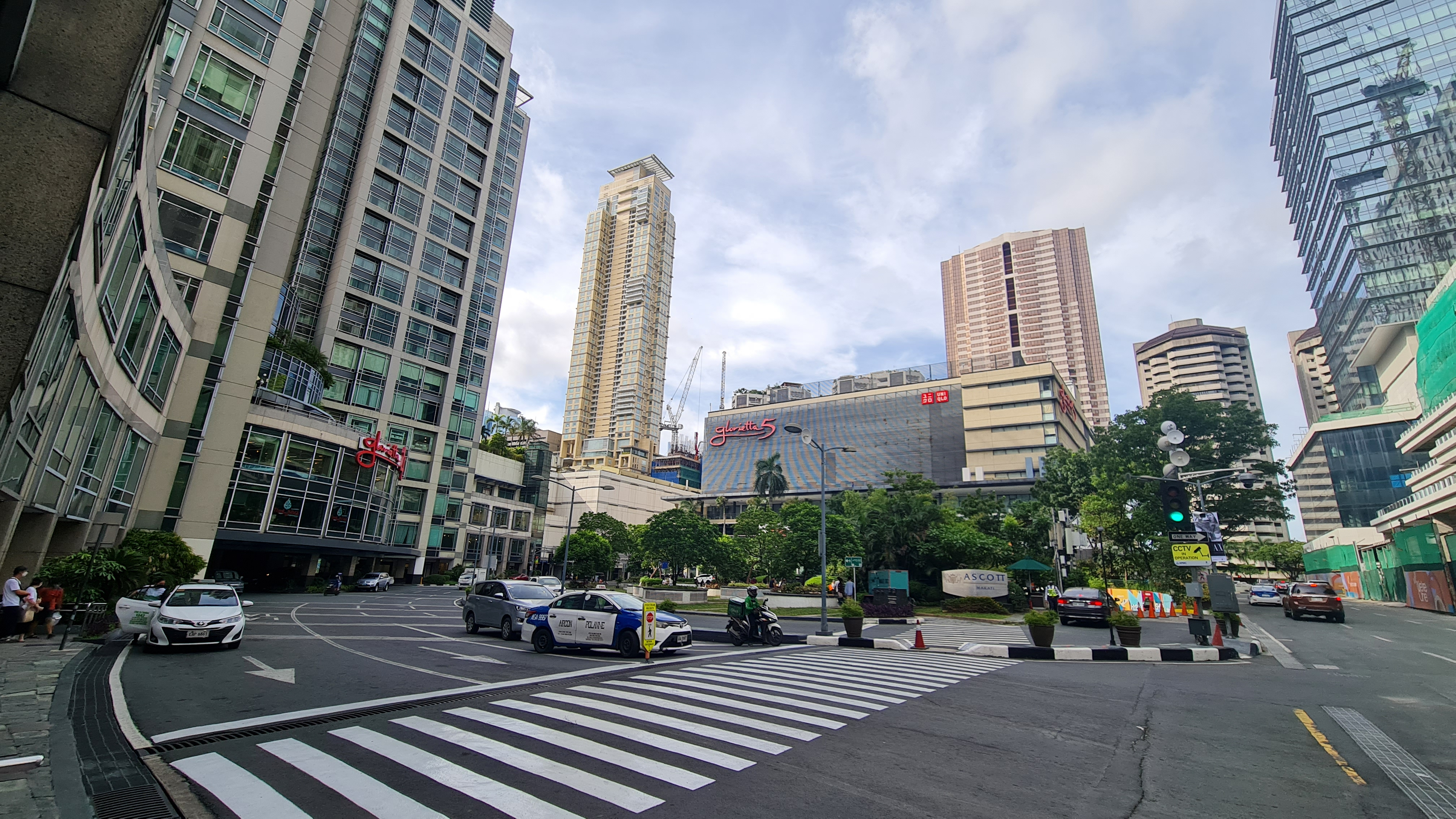
- Glorietta and surrounding buildings

Project
- Opening date: 1991; 35 years ago
- Size: 50 ha (120 acres)
- Developer: Ayala Land
- Owner: Ayala Land
- Website: Ayala Malls

Physical features
- Transport: Ayala; E Ayala One Ayala: 10 11 12 17 38 40 42 45 48 59; Glorietta: 10 12 17 38 40 42 45 48 59; EDSA Ayala: EX01 L01 N01 NR01 NR17 W01 WR01 WR18; L16 Glorietta; L17 One Ayala

Location
- Location in Metro Manila Location in Luzon Location in the Philippines
- Coordinates: 14°33′07″N 121°01′23″E
- Country: Philippines
- Region: Metro Manila
- City: Makati
- Location: San Lorenzo, Makati, Metro Manila, Philippines

The Ayala Center is a 50-hectare (120-acre) mixed-use major commercial development operated by Ayala Land located in Barangay San Lorenzo within the Makati Central Business District in Makati, Metro Manila, Philippines. The complex comprises three shopping malls, three department stores, each with its own retail shops, restaurant arcades and cinemas, several hotels, eight residential towers, five office towers, four parking buildings, and leisure amenities such as the Greenbelt Park, Glorietta 3 Park, and the Ayala Museum, showcasing exhibits on Philippine history and art.

The Ayala Center is surrounded by Ayala Avenue, De la Rosa Street, and Legazpi Street to the north, Epifanio de los Santos Avenue (EDSA/C-4) to the east, Arnaiz Avenue to the south, and Paseo de Roxas to the west. The Ayala station of MRT Line 3 serves the area.

== History ==
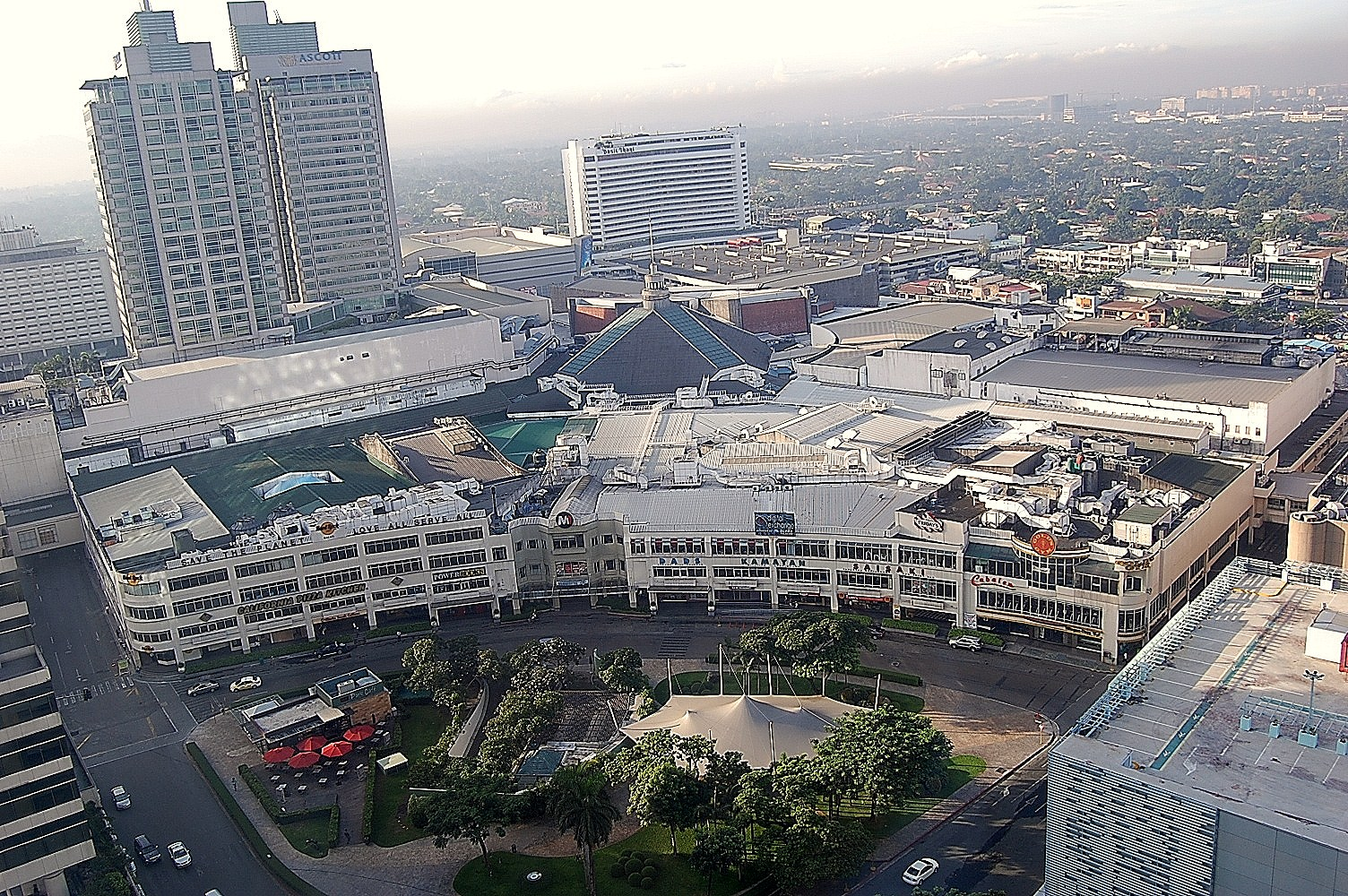
Aerial view of Glorietta in Ayala Center (2008)

Ayala Center's predecessors were the Makati Commercial Center and Greenbelt, originally an open-space park called Greenbelt Junction in the 1970s.

The Makati Commercial Center, built in 1960, consisted of several small arcades (Maranaw Arcade, Makati Arcade, Angela Arcade, Lising's Commercial, Mayfair Center, Bricktown, Anson's), theaters (Rizal Theater and The Quad), freestanding retail outlets (including Makati Supermart, Sulo Restaurant, Automat Restaurant, Coronado Lanes, Rustan's, Shoe Mart and Mercury Drug), open parks, and hotels (including Manila Garden Hotel and InterContinental Hotel Manila). It was later renamed The Center Makati in the 1980s. The Makati Supermart and Maranaw Arcade were razed by a fire in 1985, leading to their demolition. This paved the way for the opening of The Landmark in 1988 on the site of the former Maranaw Arcade and Coronado Lanes.

On the other hand, Greenbelt evolved from an open-space park known as Greenbelt Junction, which in the 1970s had an aviary and surrounding low-rise structures with dining establishments. Additional developments in the 1980s include the Greenbelt Square, Fair Center, Greenbelt Arcade, a McDonald's branch, and Greenbelt Mall, which were later combined to form Greenbelt.

In the 1990s, the Ayalas redeveloped The Center Makati by merging the existing Makati Commercial Center with the Greenbelt complex into a new 50-hectare (120-acre) development and was renamed Ayala Center in 1991. Its redevelopment has been ongoing in phases since the late 2000s, which includes the renovation and expansion of Glorietta (initially known as Quad) and Greenbelt malls and replacing old buildings and open parking spaces with new office buildings, residential towers, hotels, and the One Ayala complex, respectively.

=== 2000 bombing ===
On May 17, 2000, at 5:02 p.m. PHT, Glorietta was bombed, injuring 12 persons, mostly teenagers. According to local authorities, the homemade bomb was placed in front of a toilet beside a video arcade. This bombing was said to be a precursor to the May 21, 2000 SM Megamall bombing and the December 30, 2000 Rizal Day bombings.

=== 2007 explosion ===
The 2007 Glorietta explosion ripped through the Glorietta 2 section of the Glorietta shopping complex at Ayala Center in Makati on October 19, 2007, killing 11 people and injuring 120. Despite conflicting reports, it was concluded that the explosion was caused by a faulty liquefied petroleum gas tank in a Chinese restaurant.

== Facilities and tenants ==
=== Shopping malls ===
==== Glorietta ====
Glorietta is a large-scale major shopping mall located in the central part of the complex. The mall is divided into 5 different sections: Glorietta 1, Glorietta 2, Glorietta 3, Glorietta 4, and Glorietta 5, with Glorietta 5 situated across the main Glorietta complex. Glorietta has a total floor area of 250,000 m^{2} (2,700,000 sq ft) and offers a diverse range of retail spaces and restaurants, with Gloriettas 1 & 2 hosting mid-range retail brands and local fashion brands while the Glorietta 3 caters most of its spaces to international brands. Glorietta 4 hosts a diverse range of retail and leisure spaces while the Glorietta 5 features a mix of both local and international brands. The mall also features a wide range of amenities ranging from the main atrium located between the malls, the Glorietta 1 activity area, and the rooftop garden at the 4th level, where the Korea Town and the Japan Town are located, hosting both Korean and Japanese restaurants. The mall also has direct access to other properties within the complex such as the Ascott Makati, which is directly connected to the Glorietta 4, the Holiday Inn & Suites Makati, which is located between Gloriettas 1 & 2, the Glorietta 1 Corporate Center located within Glorietta 1 and adjacent to Holiday Inn hotel, and the Glorietta 2 Corporate Center located within Glorietta 2. The mall is also connected to nearby properties such as The Landmark on the west and both SM Makati and One Ayala from Glorietta 5 on the east.

- Greenbelt
- One Ayala

=== Department stores ===
- Rustan's
- SM Makati
- The Landmark
- Adora
- Marks & Spencer
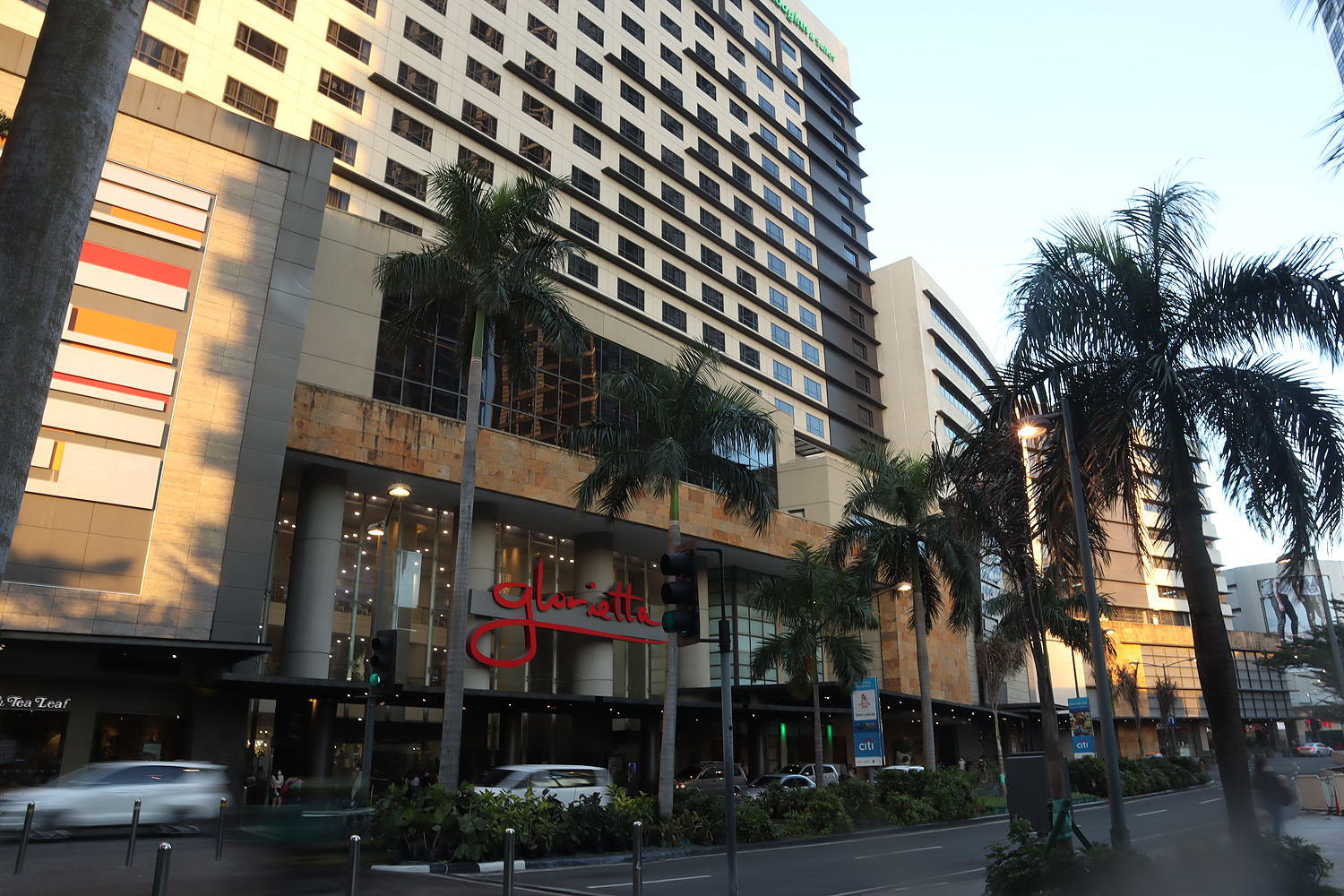
Glorietta

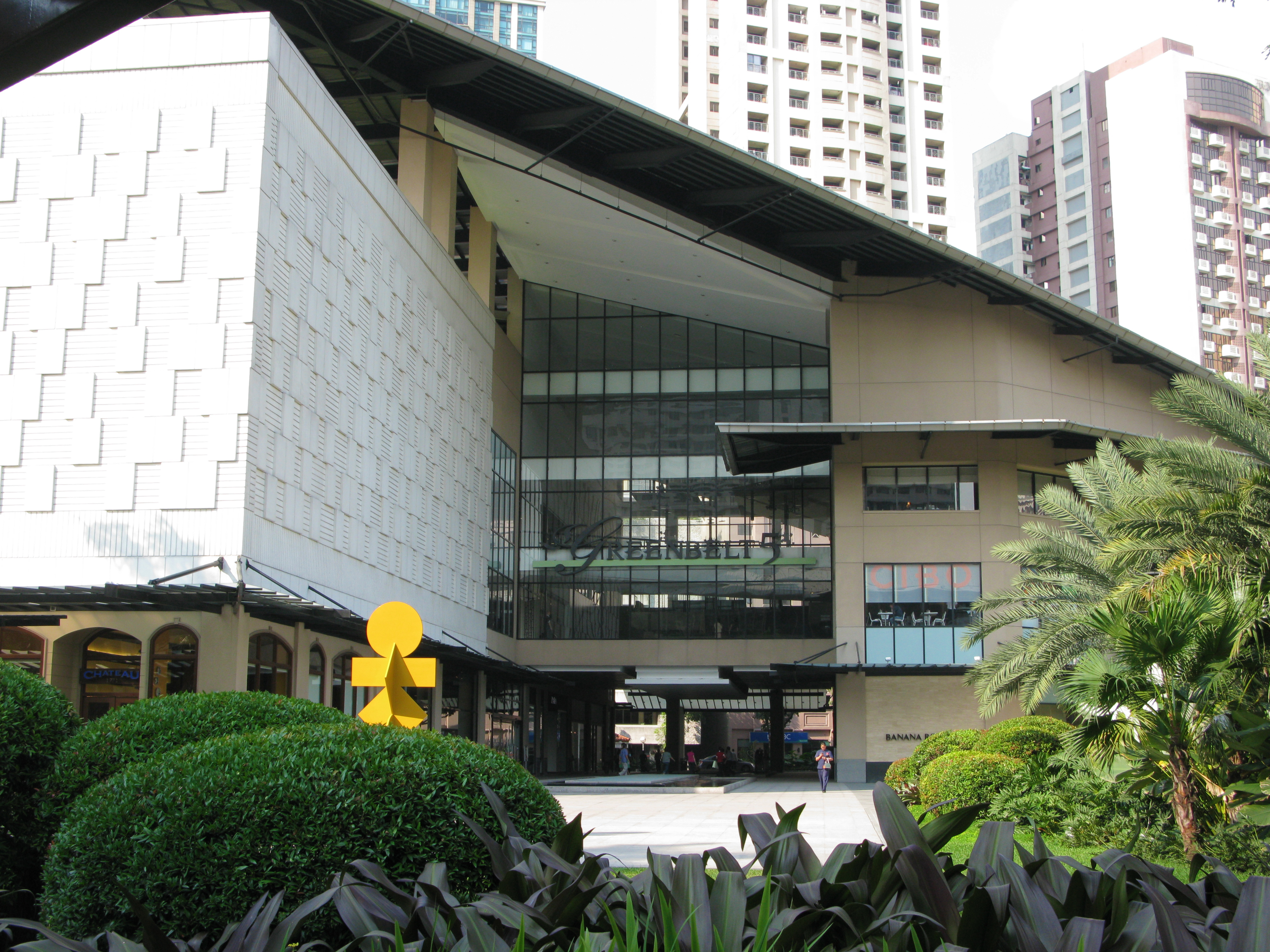
Greenbelt

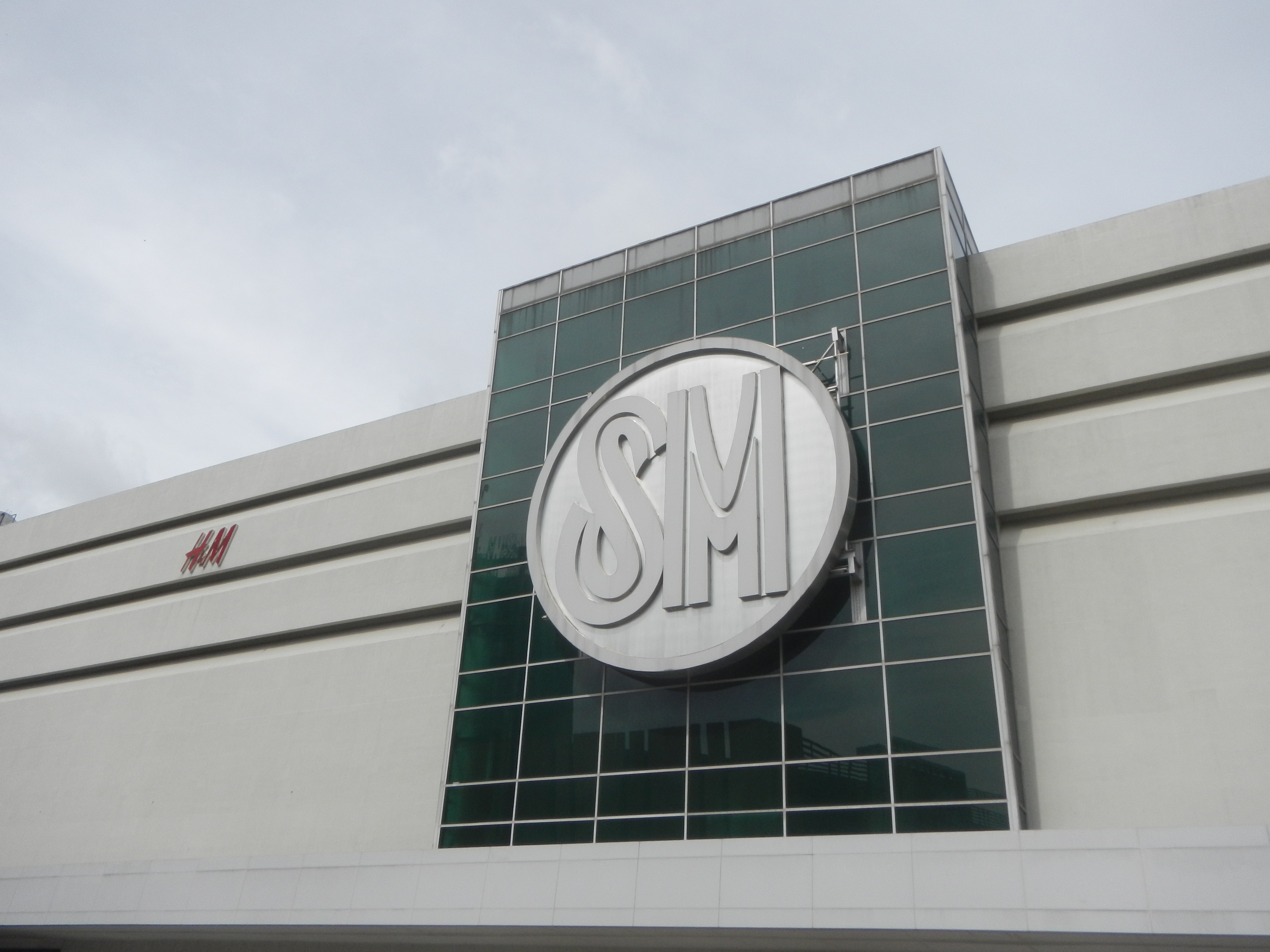
SM Makati

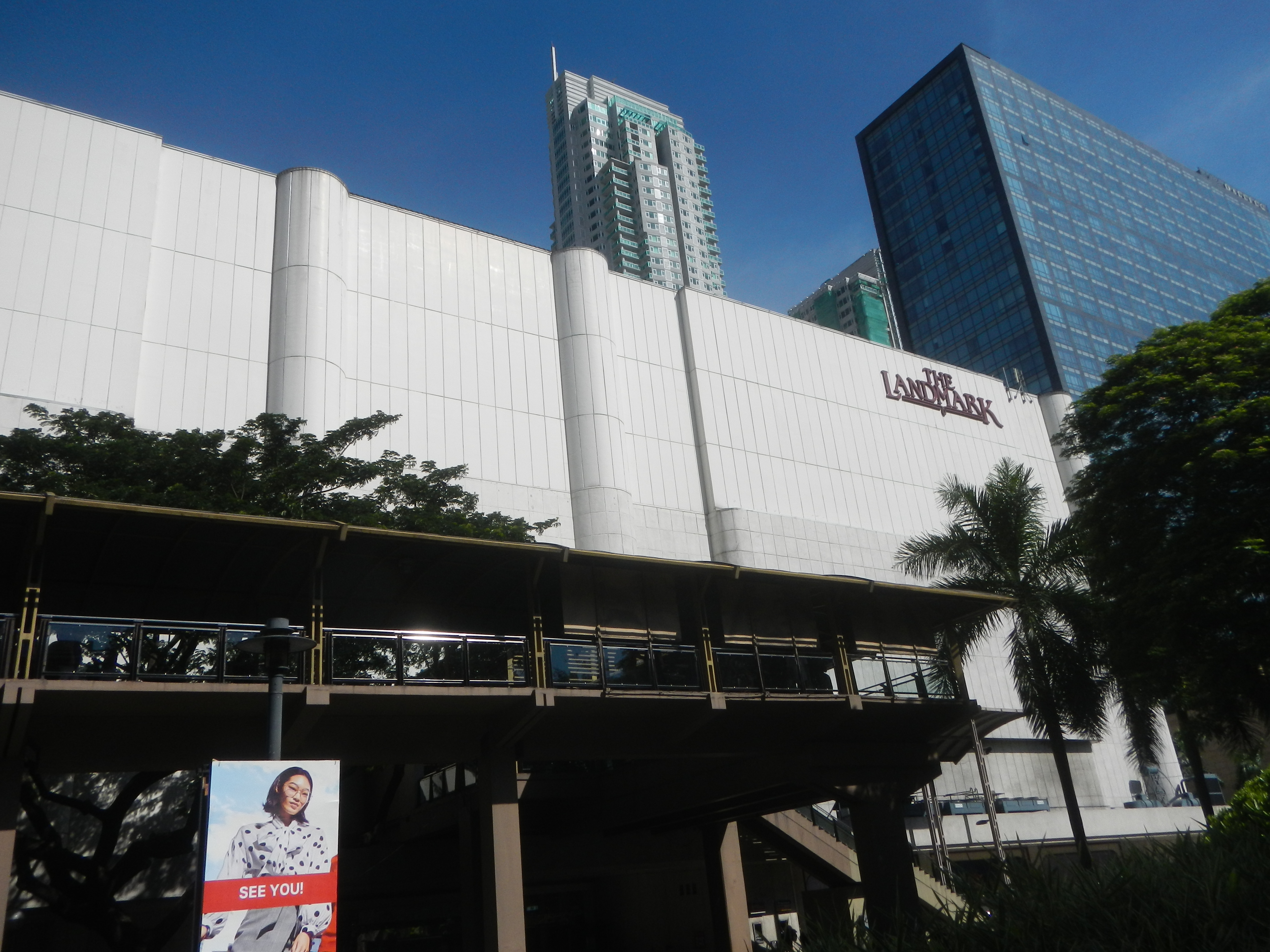
The Landmark

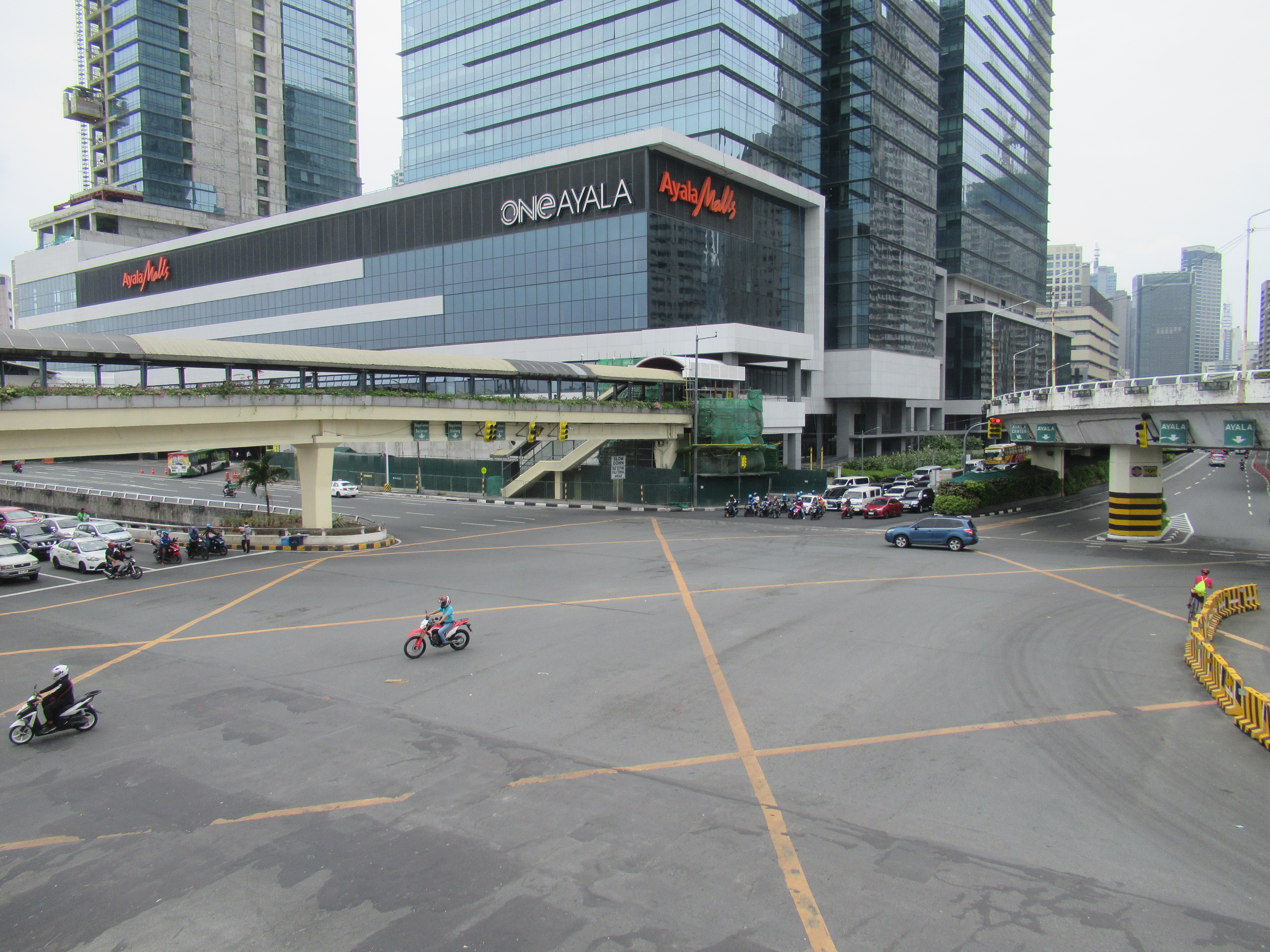
One Ayala

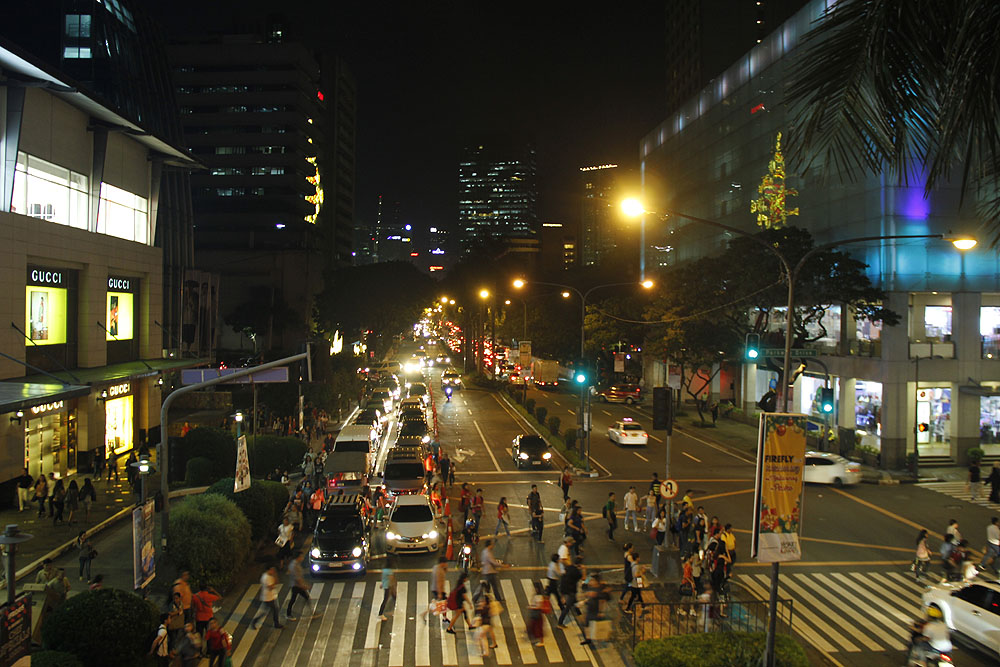
Makati Avenue

=== Parking facilities ===
Aside from the basement parking beneath Glorietta (interconnected with Park Terraces and Terraces Square), Greenbelt, and One Ayala, respectively, the following are the carpark buildings located at the complex:

- 6750 Steel Carpark
- Park Square
- Paseo Steel Carpark
- The Link
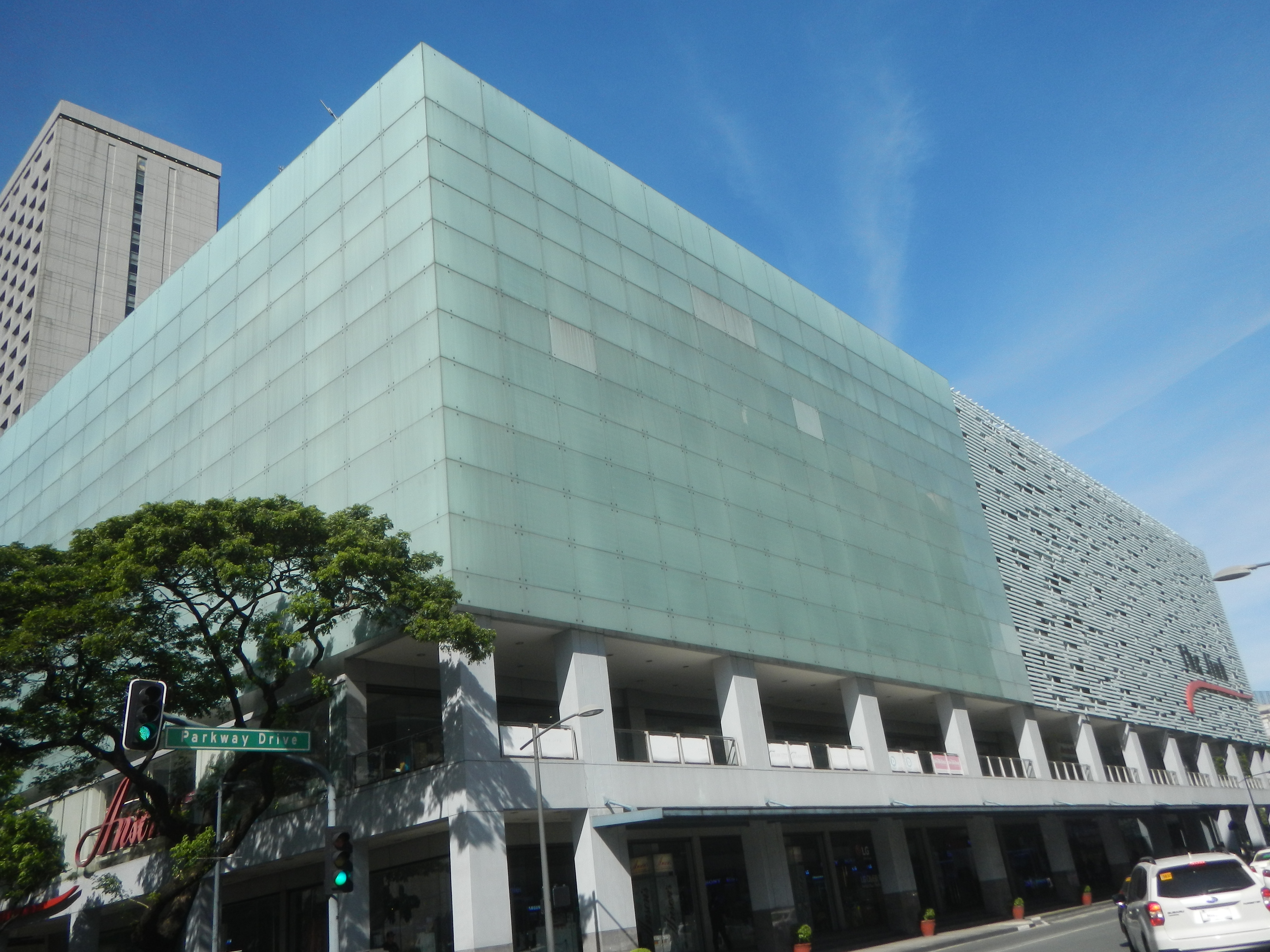
The Link

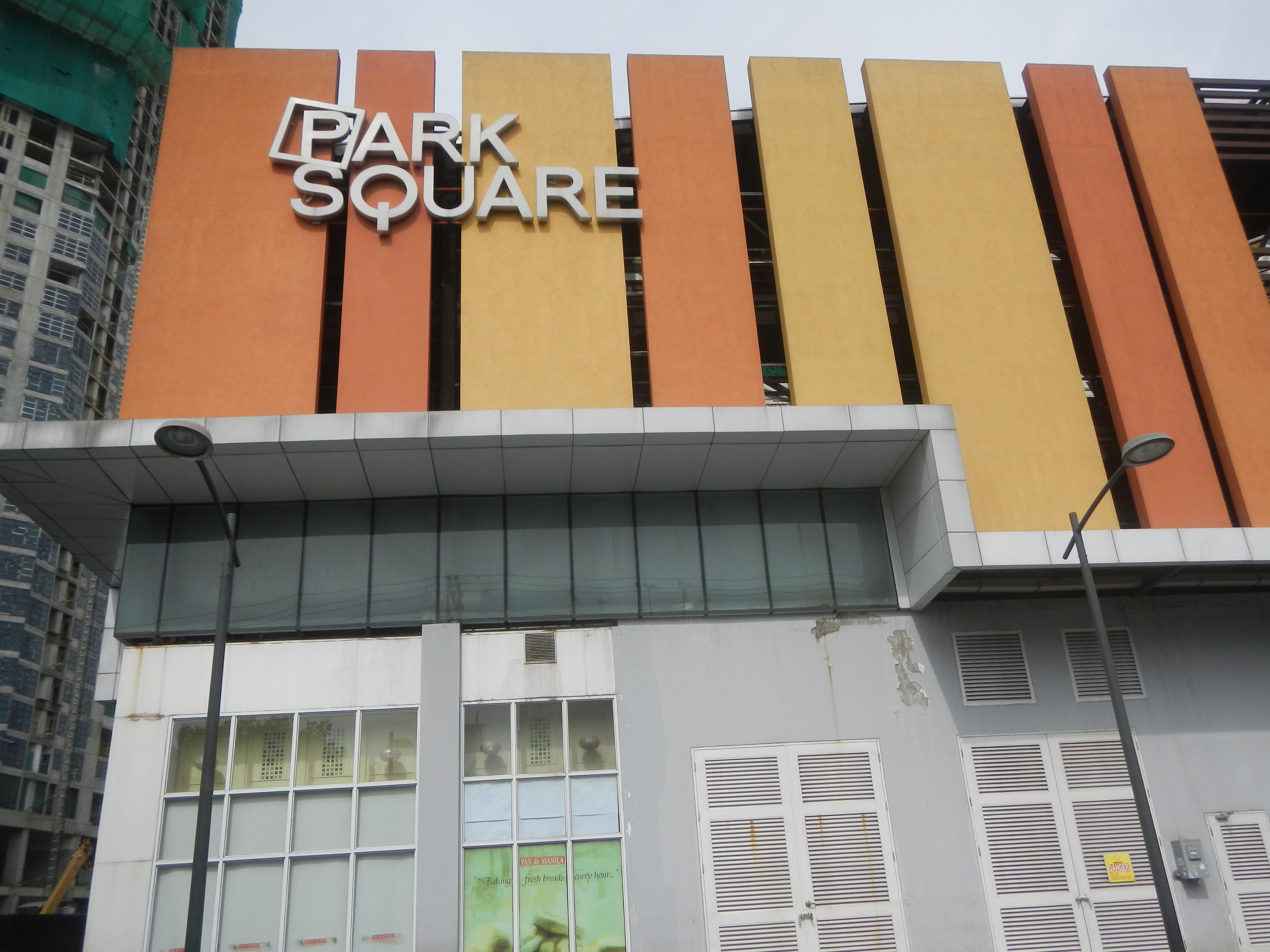
Park Square

=== Hotels ===
- Ascott Makati (formerly Oakwood Premier)
- Dusit Thani Manila
- Makati Fairmont Hotel and Raffles Suites and Residences
- Holiday Inn & Suites Makati
- New World Renaissance Hotel
- Makati Shangri-La
- Canopy by Hilton Makati (opening in 2026)

Hotel InterContinental Manila was closed in 2015 and demolished shortly thereafter to make way for the redevelopment that is One Ayala.

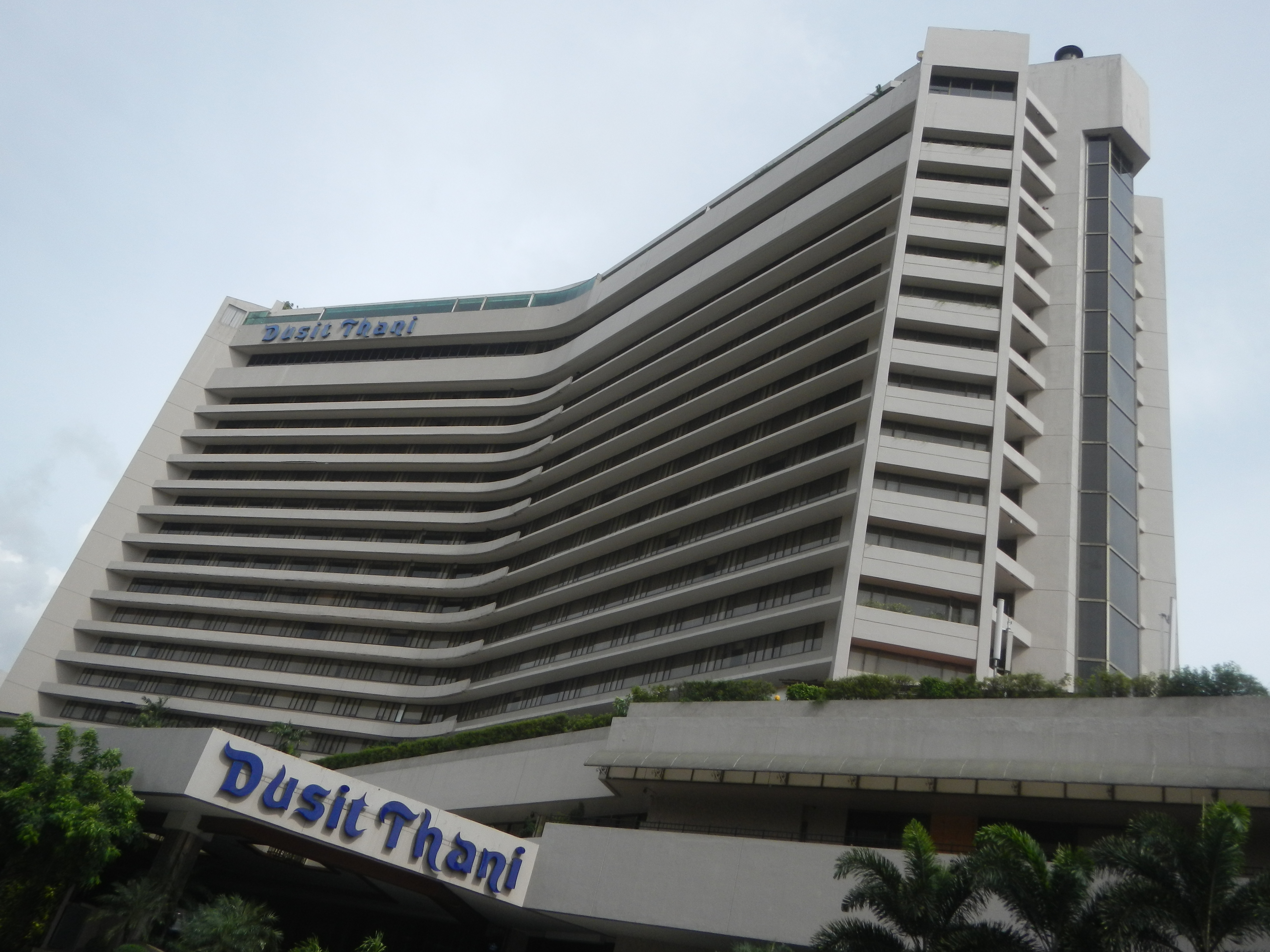
Dusit Thani Manila

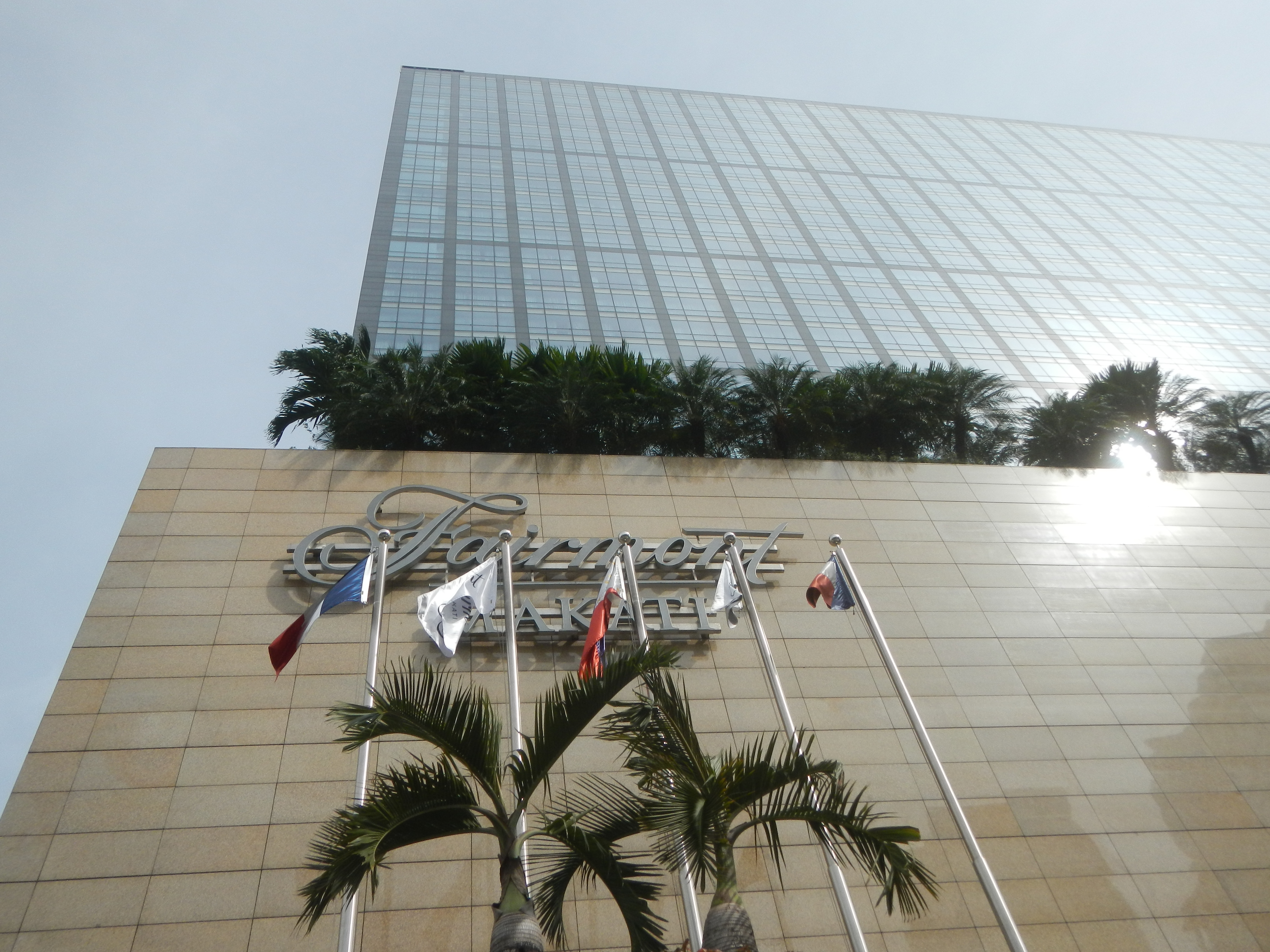
Makati Fairmont Hotel

Makati Shangri-La, Manila

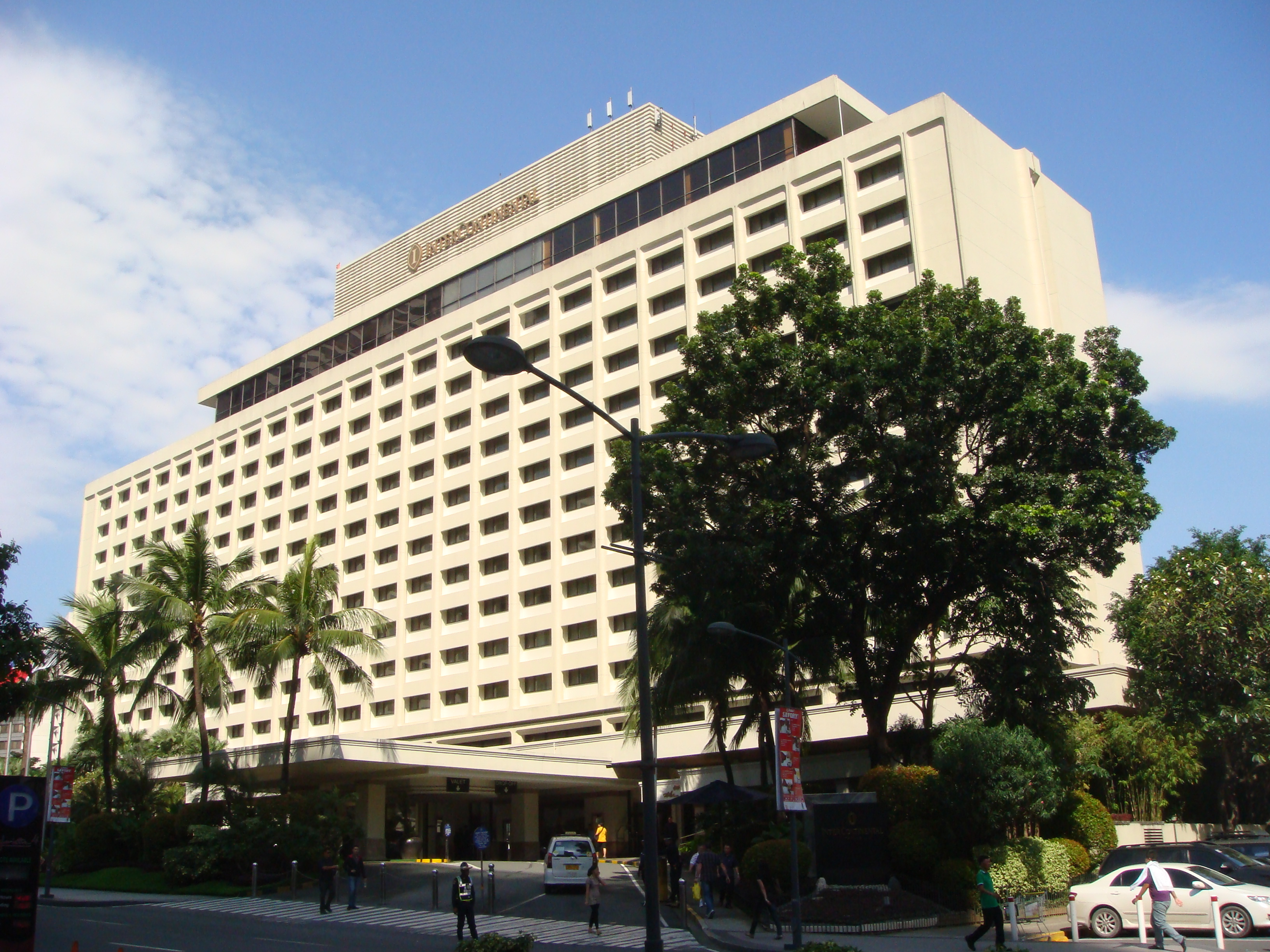
InterContinental Manila

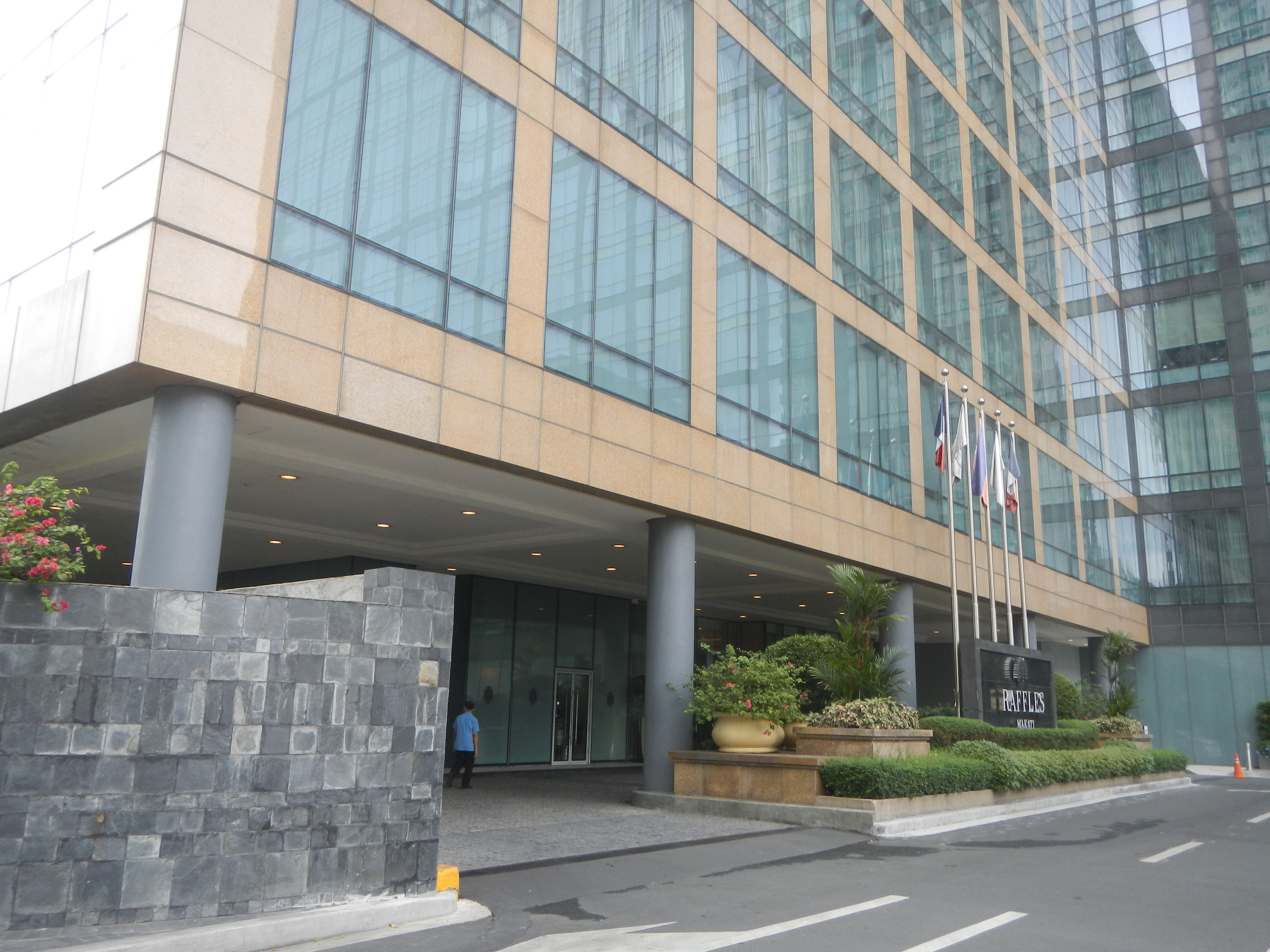
Raffles Makati

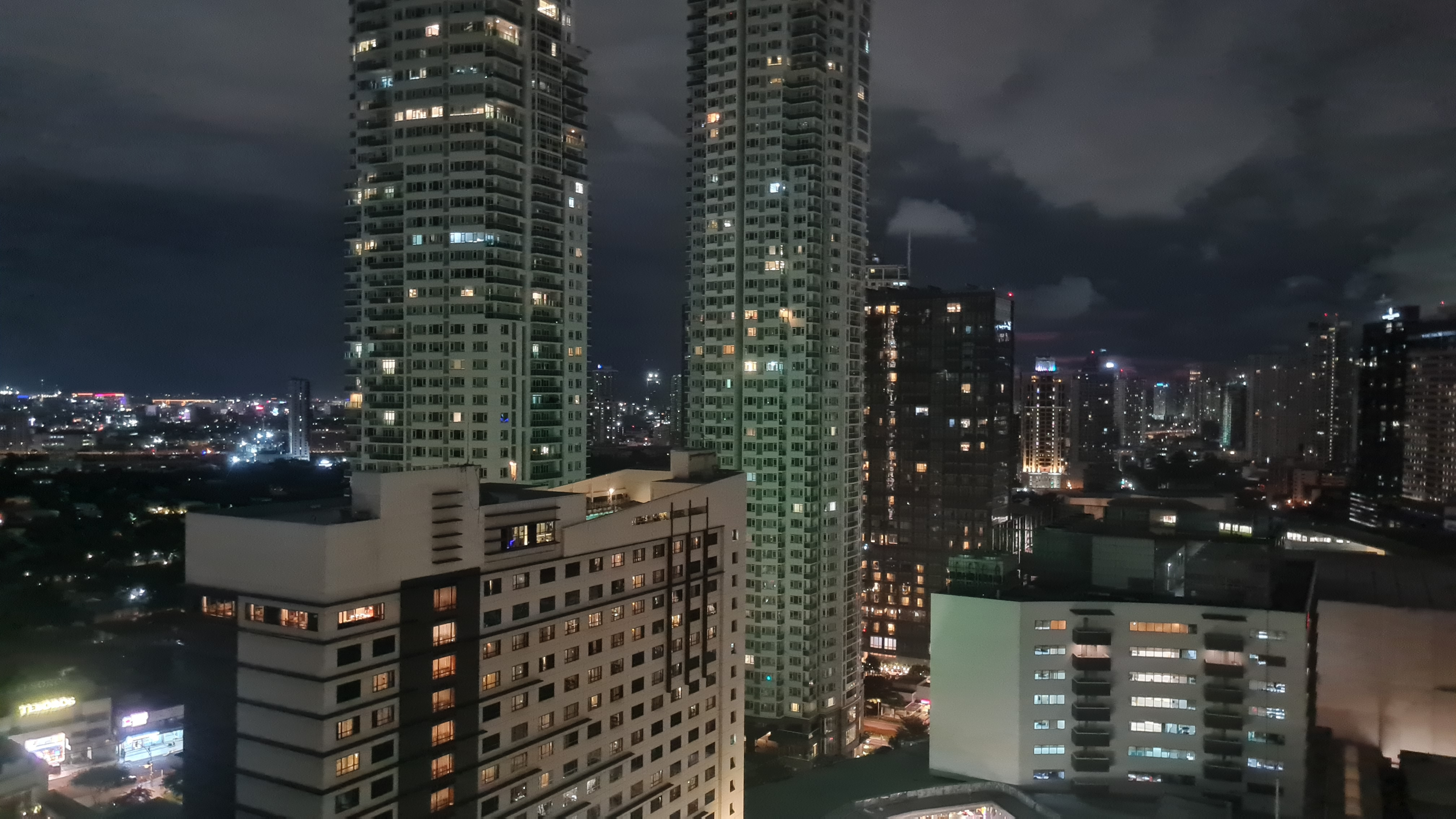
Holiday Inn Manila (foreground) with Park Terraces, Makati Fairmont Hotel, and Raffles Makati on the background. Also shown is the Glorietta 1 Corporate Center (right).

=== Office buildings ===
6750 Ayala Avenue

- 6750 Ayala Avenue
- Glorietta 1 Corporate Center
- Glorietta 2 Corporate Center
- One Ayala Tower 1 (One Ayala East Tower)
- One Ayala Tower 2 (One Ayala West Tower)
- One Ayala South Tower

== See also ==
Facade of Ayala Center Station

- Ayala Corporation
- Ayala Center Cebu
- Makati Central Business District
