= InterContinental Manila =

Hotel in Makati, Philippines

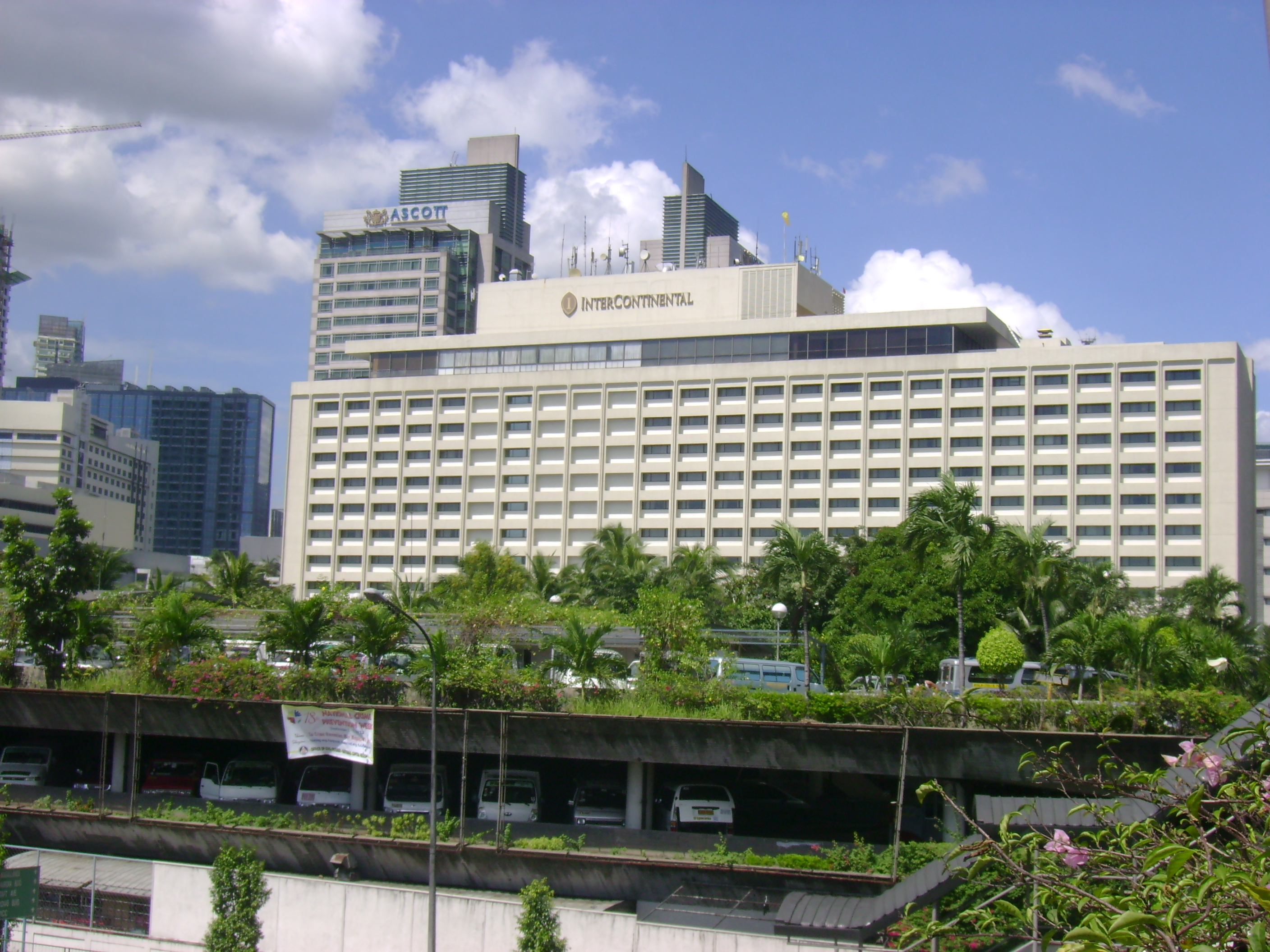
- InterContinental Manila in 2012
- Interactive map of the InterContinental Manila area
- Former names: Rizal InterContinental Hotel
- Hotel chain: InterContinental Hotels Group

General information
- Status: Demolished
- Type: Hotel
- Location: 1 Ayala Avenue, Makati, Metro Manila, Philippines
- Coordinates: 14°33′02″N 121°01′40″E
- Opening: April 11, 1969
- Closed: December 31, 2015; 10 years ago
- Demolished: March 2017; 9 years ago
- Owner: Enjay Hotels, Inc. (a subsidiary of Ayala Land)

Technical details
- Floor count: 14
- Lifts/elevators: 4

Design and construction
- Architect: Leandro Locsin
- Known for: Longest operating international chain hotel in the Philippines, First 5-star hotel in Makati

Other information
- Number of rooms: 332
- Number of suites: 56
- Number of restaurants: 2
- Number of bars: 2

Website
- intercontinental.com/manila

InterContinental Manila (colloquially Intercon/ICM) was a five-star InterContinental hotel located on Ayala Avenue in Makati, Metro Manila, Philippines. At the time of its closure, it was the longest operating international chain hotel in the Philippines. It was designed by National Artist Leandro Locsin.

The hotel opened on April 11, 1969, and ceased operations on December 31, 2015, with demolition works of the building was made from April 2016 to March 2017, and was replaced by One Ayala that opened in 2022. It was the first 5-star hotel in Makati and the second InterContinental hotel in Asia. All of its 332 guest rooms and suites were updated in 2006 to incorporate traditional and modern Filipino design.

It will be replaced by the new hotel located in Bonifacio Global City in Taguig, and is planned to open in 2032.

== History ==
=== First InterContinental Manila: 1969–2015 ===
A press released in 1958 on the building then dubbed as Rizal InterContinental Hotel, lists Rizal Development Corporation and Pan American Airways as developers of the hotel. The initial 1958 design of the hotel was not followed and shelved. Construction of the hotel would be completed ten years later in 1969, and was inaugurated as InterContinental Hotel Manila.

The InterContinental property is owned by Ayala Land Hotel's wholly owned subsidiary, Ayala Land Hotels and Resorts Corp. and has been under the management of the InterContinental Hotels Group since 1969.

==== Closure ====
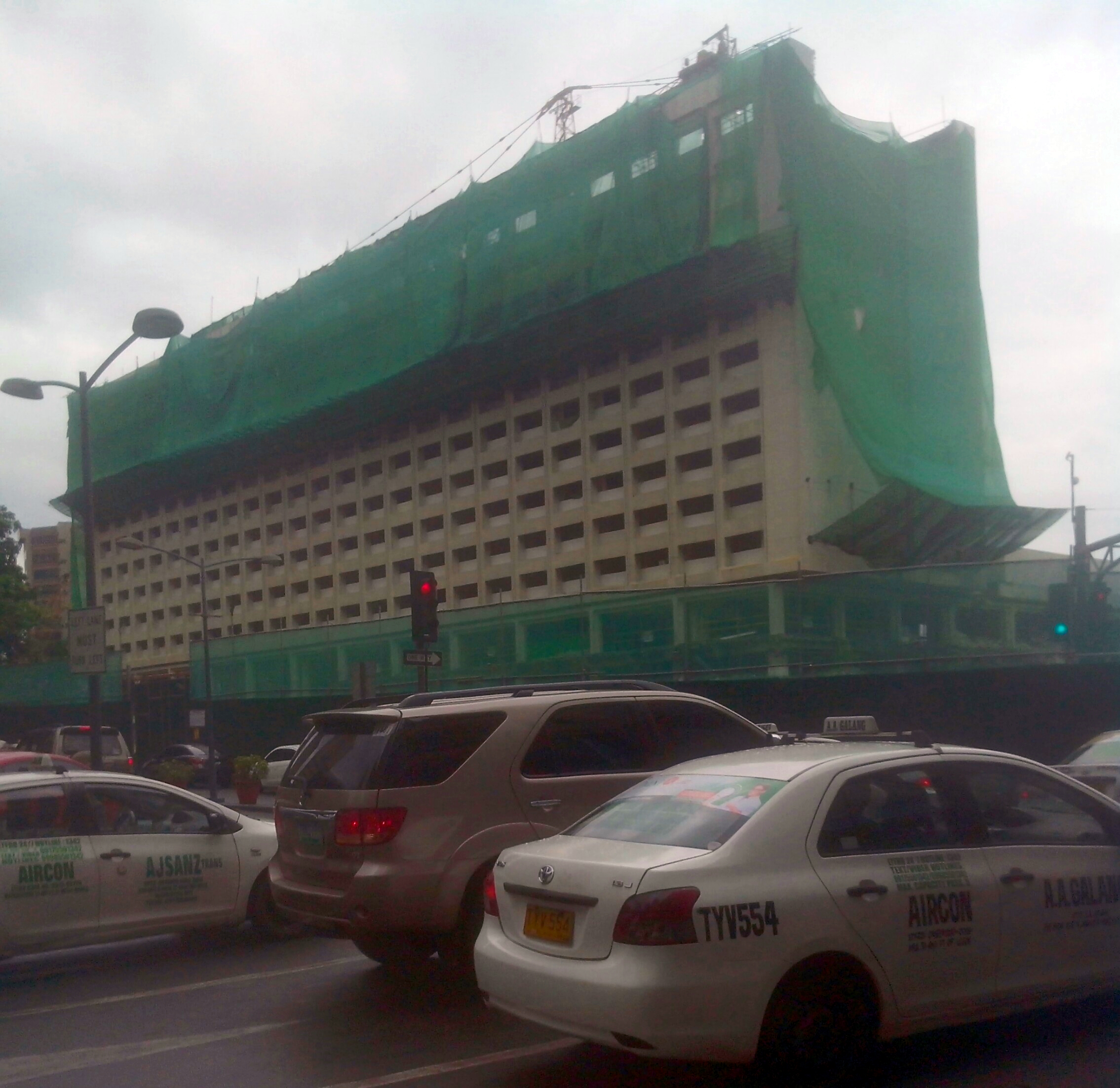
Demolition of the hotel; August 2016

The hotel ceased operations on December 31, 2015, when the hotel management contract between the subsidiary of AyalaLand Hotels and Resorts Corp and InterContinental Hotels Group ended. The hotel was replaced by One Ayala, a new mixed-used development which includes an intermodal transport facility, a new hotel (Canopy by Hilton branch), and three office towers.

=== Second InterContinental Manila ===
On March 16, 2026, IHG Hotels & Resorts announced that it will open a new InterContinental Manila located in Bonifacio Global City in Taguig in partnership with local developers Keyland Corporation, Philippine Realty and Holdings Corporation, and Greenhills Properties Inc. It will have 212 rooms and is planned to open in 2032.

== Awards ==
- 1982/83 "Best Hotel kikay Festival" for "Festival Gastronomique le Kikay bleu"

Ordre Mondial des Gourmets Gustateurs 'Trés Belle Carte (Best Wine List) Award for the Prince Albert Rotisserie

- 1997 the hotel placed first in Asia Pacific and third in the world in the D'Richey Report
- 1998 Green Globe Award for outstanding environmental programs
- 2002 "Outstanding in Community Involvement for Southern Asia" among InterContinental hotels
- 2007 voted by readers of Business Traveler Magazine Asia Pacific as one of the three top hotels in the Philippines
- 2010 TTG Travel Awards as the Best City Hotel – Manila
- 2011 TTG Travel Awards as the Best City Hotel – Manila
- 2012 TTG Travel Awards as the Best City Hotel – Manila
