= Canopy by Hilton =

Upscale hotel chain run by Hilton Worldwide

- Product type: Hotels
- Current owner: Hilton Worldwide
- Introduced: October 2014
- Website: canopybyhilton.com

Canopy by Hilton, or Canopy, is a hotel brand by Hilton, announced in October 2014 with the first property opening in Iceland in July 2016, and two in the United States in early 2018. Canopy is Hilton's twelfth brand.

== History ==
Prior to announcing the Canopy brand in October 2014, Hilton conducted several years of research and consumer testing by surveying more than 9,000 American, British, and Chinese travelers to help shape the concept. During this time, the brand also experienced a "false start" that set its launch back by at least two years, the result of a 2010 legal settlement with Starwood, which alleged that Hilton gained possession of its documents related to lifestyle brand development. Though Hilton did not admit to any wrongdoing, the company agreed to a payment to Starwood and to delay the brand's launch by two years. Hilton initially confirmed plans for eleven properties in Europe and the United States. In 2015, Canopy by Hilton confirmed it was developing properties in eight American cities and Iceland. Hilton announced plans to develop a Canopy property in San Antonio in 2016. Hilton's goal is to have 100 properties open or in development in both major metropolitan areas and mid-size cities within five years of the brand's launch. Hilton announced plans to develop a Canopy property in Sioux Falls in 2022.

== Properties ==
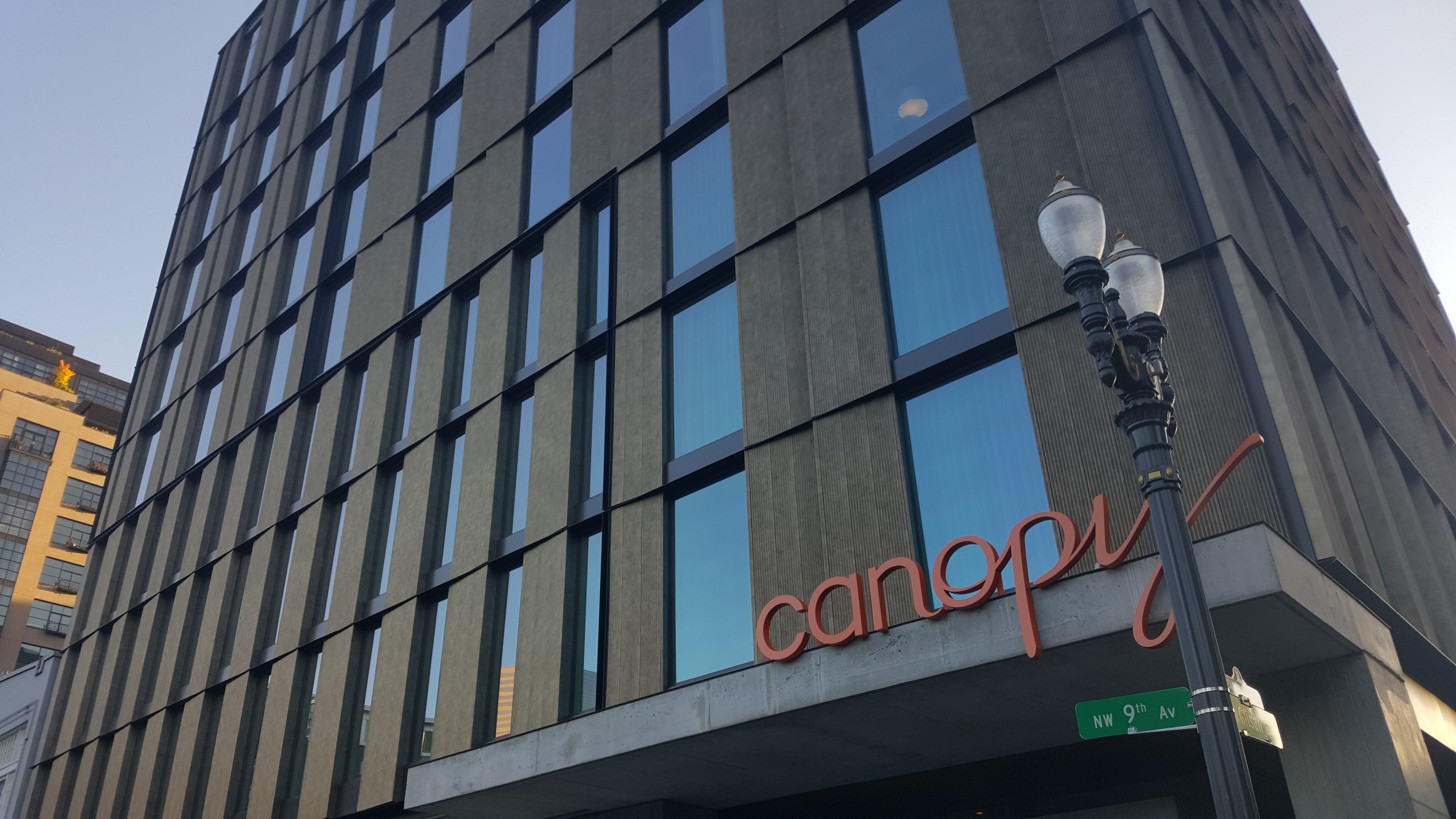
Canopy by Hilton in Portland

The first Canopy by Hilton hotel opened in Reykjavík, Iceland, in July 2016. The first two properties in the United States opened in the Washington, D.C. area in early 2018, at The Wharf in Southwest Washington and in Bethesda, Maryland. As of March 2018 the company was developing about thirty properties, most in the United States. Around eighty percent are new builds, while the others are planned conversions; the London Canopy hotel, in Aldgate, is a combination of both.

== Promotion and branding ==
Canopy by Hilton hotels have a local feel, in response to customer testing. Employees are called "enthusiasts" and beds have a "canopy" created by a grey headboard that reaches to the ceiling and overhangs. The brand's introductory video features scenes filmed in Baltimore and Istanbul. In November 2014, Hilton Worldwide built two Canopy model rooms at its headquarters in McLean, Virginia, and showcased them to media and press. One showcased new construction, the other a conversion; one illustrated an "imaginary" room in Greenpoint, Brooklyn, while the other exemplified Reykjavík Canopy. The models were based on feedback from more than 11,000 consumers.

The brand previously used a bright orange logo and orange accents because it evoked "good energy" in consumer testing. Employees of the month will be given orange Converse shoes and some properties have orange bicycles available for use.
