= Quezon Avenue station =

Elevated passenger train station in Diliman, Quezon City, Philippines

Coordinates: 14°38′32.8″N 121°02′19.225″E

Quezon Avenue	YL02
- Quezen Avenue station in November 2026

General information
- Location: EDSA, Pinyahan & South Triangle; Quezon City, Metro Manila; Philippines
- Owner: Department of Transportation
- Operator: Department of Transportation
- Line: MRT Line 3
- Platforms: 2 (2 side)
- Tracks: 2
- Connections: E Quezon Avenue; Future: 8 EDSA; MMS Quezon Avenue

Construction
- Structure type: Elevated
- Parking: Yes (Eton Centris)
- Accessible: Concourse: All entrances Platforms: All platforms

History
- Opened: December 15, 1999; 26 years ago

Services
Preceding station	Manila MRT	Following station
North Avenue Terminus	MRT Line 3	GMA–Kamuning towards Taft Avenue

Out-of-system interchange
Preceding station	Manila MRT	Following station
North Avenue towards East Valenzuela	Metro Manila Subway transfer at Quezon Avenue	East Avenue towards FTI or NAIA Terminal 3
Track layout
Location

Quezon Avenue station is an elevated Metro Rail Transit (MRT) station located on the MRT Line 3 (MRT-3) system in Diliman, Quezon City. It is named after Quezon Avenue, one of the major thoroughfares of the city.

The station is the second station for trains headed to Taft Avenue and the twelfth station for trains headed to North Avenue.

== History ==
Quezon Avenue station was planned as part of the Phase 1 of the EDSA LRT III project, following a Build-Lease-Transfer (BLT) agreement between the Department of Transportation and Communications (DOTC) and EDSA LRT Corporation on September 22, 1992. However, the project faced delays due to government investigations into the contract, and construction was postponed until the Supreme Court of the Philippines upheld the contract's legality in 1995. Construction finally began on October 15, 1996 as the MRT III project, under a BLT contract awarded to the Metro Rail Transit Corporation (MRTC), led by a consortium of local companies.

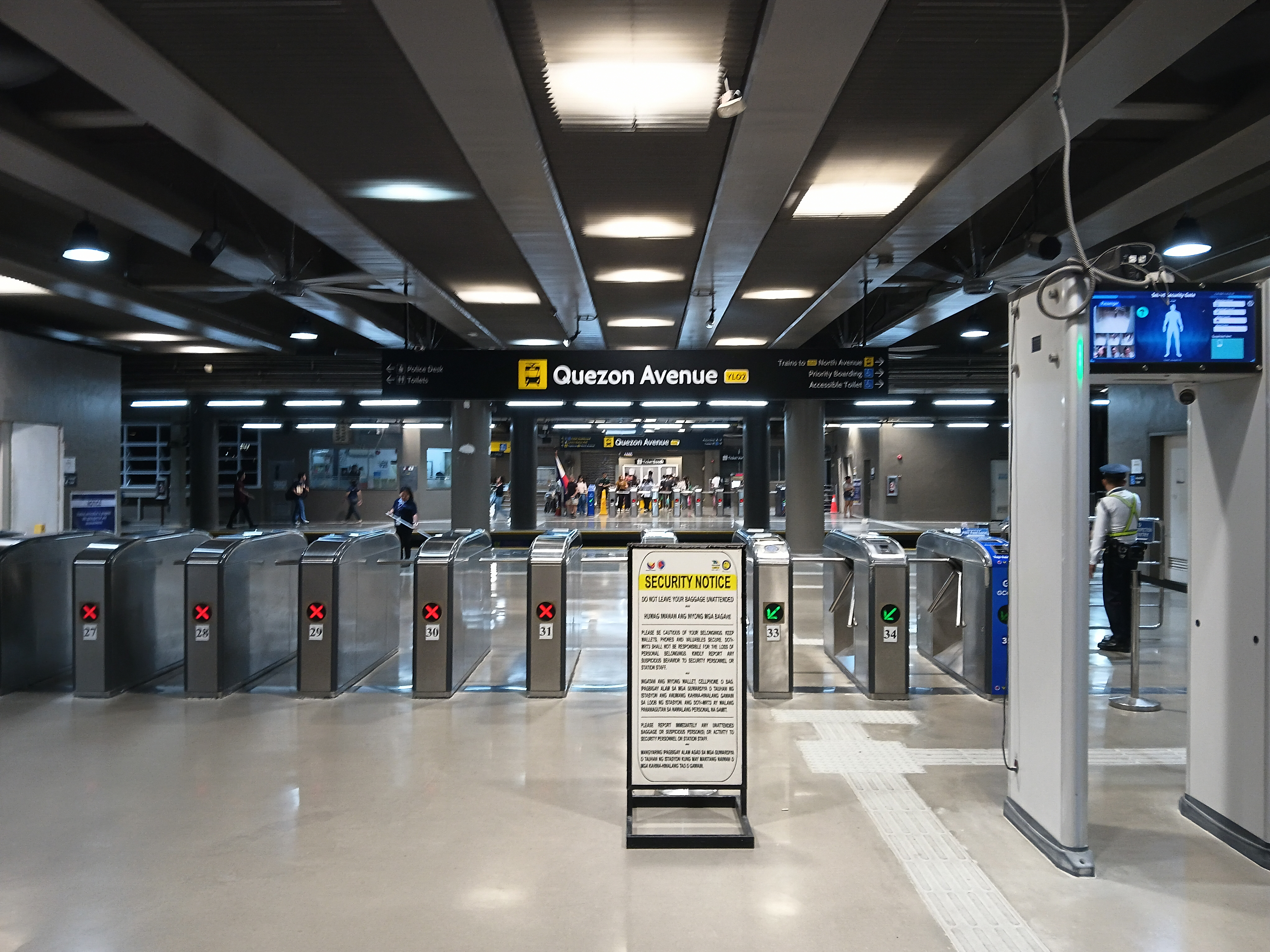
East entrance featuring a new signage in 2026

Quezon Avenue station was opened on December 15, 1999, as part of MRT's initial section from North Avenue to Buendia. A link between the station and Centris Station, a shopping mall at Eton Centris launched in 2009, was later added.

The station underwent a comprehensive renovation and was officially unveiled in April 2026.

== Nearby landmarks ==
Station exterior

Some of the well-known landmarks adjacent to the station are the ABS-CBN Broadcasting Center, Bantayog ng mga Bayani, and DILG-NAPOLCOM Center. Quezon Memorial Circle and Triangle Park can also be accessed from this station where a few government buildings stand like the PAGASA Complex, Power Center (home to National Grid Corporation of the Philippines, National Transmission Corporation, and National Power Corporation), Office of the Ombudsman, Court of Tax Appeals and the Lung Center of the Philippines. The station is directly linked to Centris Station and Centris Walk shopping centers within Eton Centris.

== Transportation links ==
Buses, jeepneys, taxis, and UV Express can be used to navigate the area. A namesake EDSA Carousel station is located nearby and was previously accessible through the MRT station. A transport terminal could also be found behind Centris Station.

== See also ==
- List of rail transit stations in Metro Manila
- MRT Line 3 (Metro Manila)
