= MRT Line 3 (Metro Manila) =

Rail line in Metro Manila, Philippines

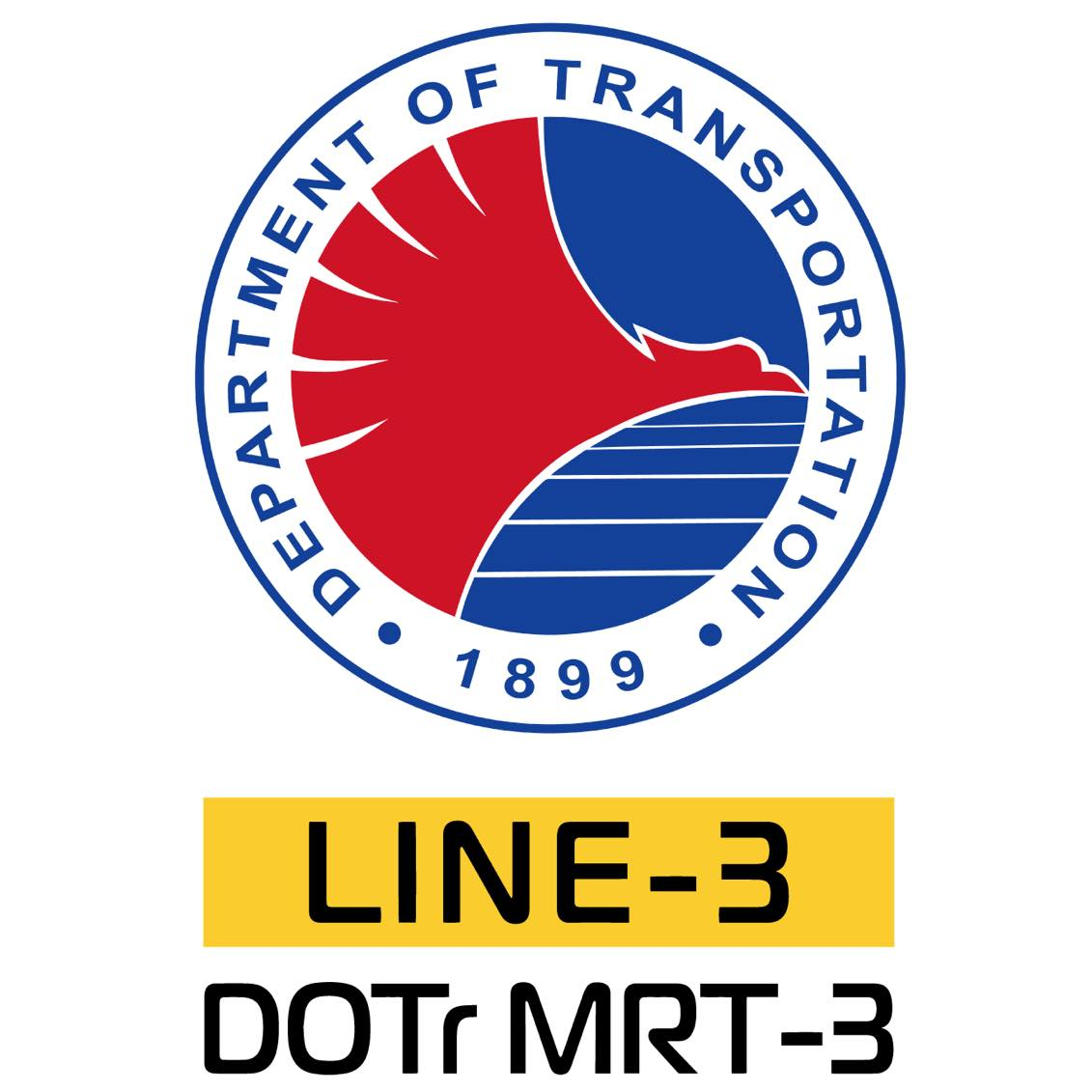

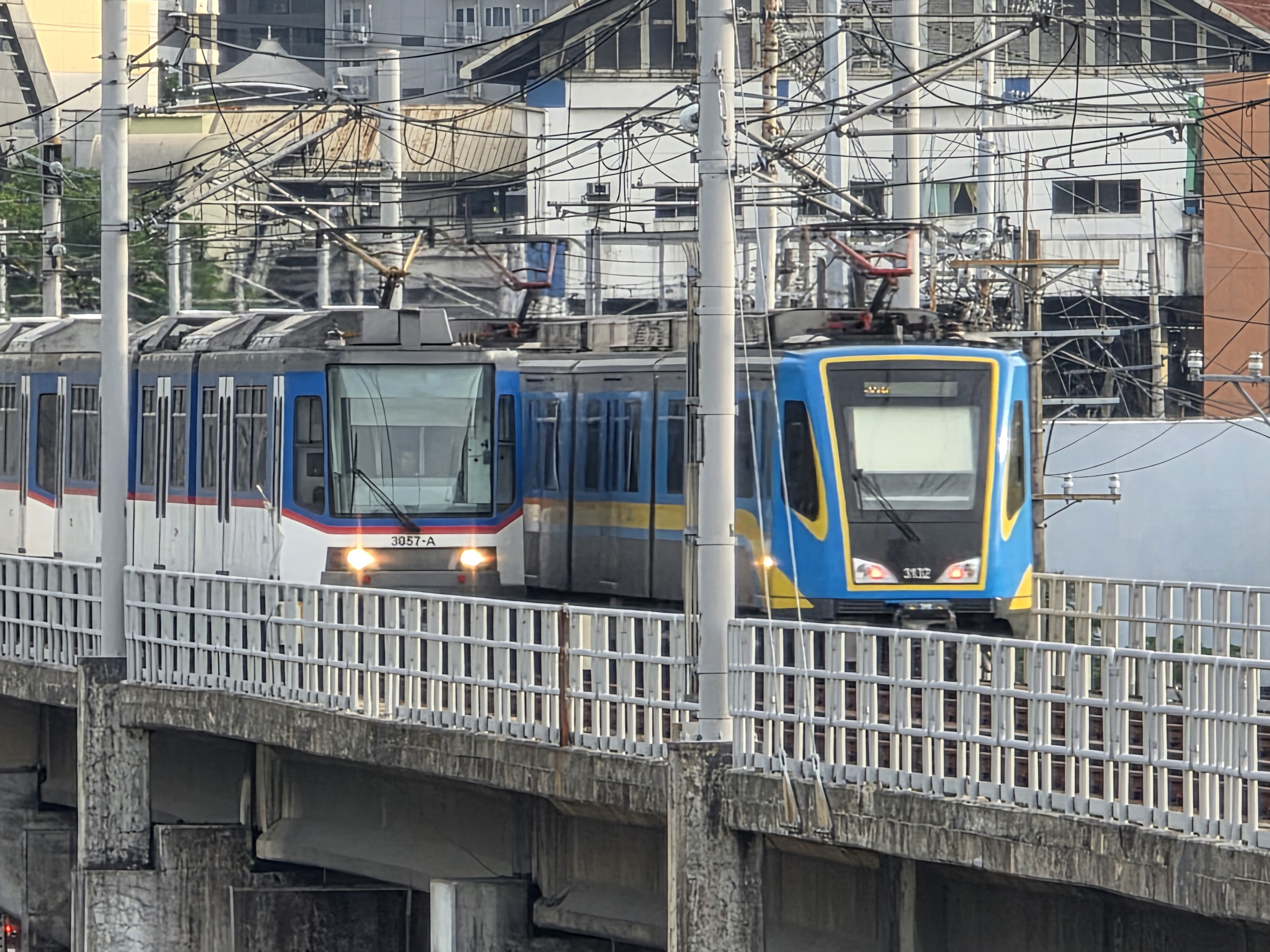
- A 3000 class and 3100 class train near Ortigas station in August 2025

Overview
- Native name: Filipino: Ikatlong Linya ng Sistema ng Kalakhang Riles Panlulan ng Maynila
- Status: Operational
- Owner: Metro Rail Transit Corporation (2000–2025); Department of Transportation (2025–present)
- Line number: 3
- Locale: Metro Manila, Philippines
- Termini: North Triangle (future) North Avenue; Taft Avenue
- Stations: 14 (13 operational; 1 under construction)
- Website: www.dotrmrt3.gov.ph

Service
- Type: Light rapid transit
- System: Manila Metro Rail Transit System
- Services: 1
- Operator: Department of Transportation
- Depot: North Avenue
- Rolling stock: MRTC 3000 class MRTC 3100 class
- Daily ridership: 392,317 (2025)
- Ridership: 141,626,536 (2025)

History
- Opened: December 15, 1999; 26 years ago

Technical
- Line length: 16.9 km (10.5 mi)
- Num of tracks: Double
- Character: Grade separated
- Track gauge: 1,435 mm (4 ft 8 1/2 in) standard gauge
- Loading gauge: 3,730 mm × 2,600 mm (12 ft 3 in × 8 ft 6 in)
- Minimum radius: 370 m (1,210 ft) (mainline); 25 m (82 ft) (depot)
- Electrification: 750 V DC overhead catenary
- Operating speed: 60 km/h (37 mph)
- Signalling: Alstom CITYFLO 250 fixed block with subsystems of EBICAB 900 ATP, EBI Screen 900 CTC, and EBI Lock 950 CBI
- Maximum incline: 4% (mainline); 5% (depot spur line)
- Average inter-station distance: 1.28 km (0.80 mi)

The Manila Metro Rail Transit Line 3, also known as the MRT Line 3 or MRT-3, is a rapid transit line in Metro Manila in the Philippines. The line runs in an orbital north to south route following the alignment of Epifanio de los Santos Avenue (EDSA). Despite its name, the line is more akin to a light rapid transit system owing to its tram-like rolling stock while having total grade separation and high passenger throughput. Originally known as the Metrostar Express or the Blue Line, the line was reclassified to be the Yellow Line in 2012.

Envisioned in the 1970s and 1980s as part of various feasibility studies, the 13-station, 16.9-kilometer (10.5 mi) line was the second rapid transit line to be built in Metro Manila when it started full operations in 2000. The line is owned and operated by the Philippine government's Department of Transportation (DOTr). It was previously owned by the Metro Rail Transit Corporation (MRTC) under a 25-year build–lease–transfer agreement with the DOTr, which expired on July 15, 2025.

The line is integrated with the public transit system in Metro Manila, where passengers also take various forms of road-based public transport, such as buses, to and from a station to reach their intended destination. Serving close to 400,000 passengers on a daily basis, the line is the busiest among Metro Manila's three rapid transit lines. Total ridership significantly exceeds its built maximum capacity of 350,000 passengers a day, with various solutions being proposed or implemented to alleviate chronic congestion. Expanding the network's capacity to accommodate the rising number of passengers is currently set on tackling this problem.

== History ==
=== Early planning ===
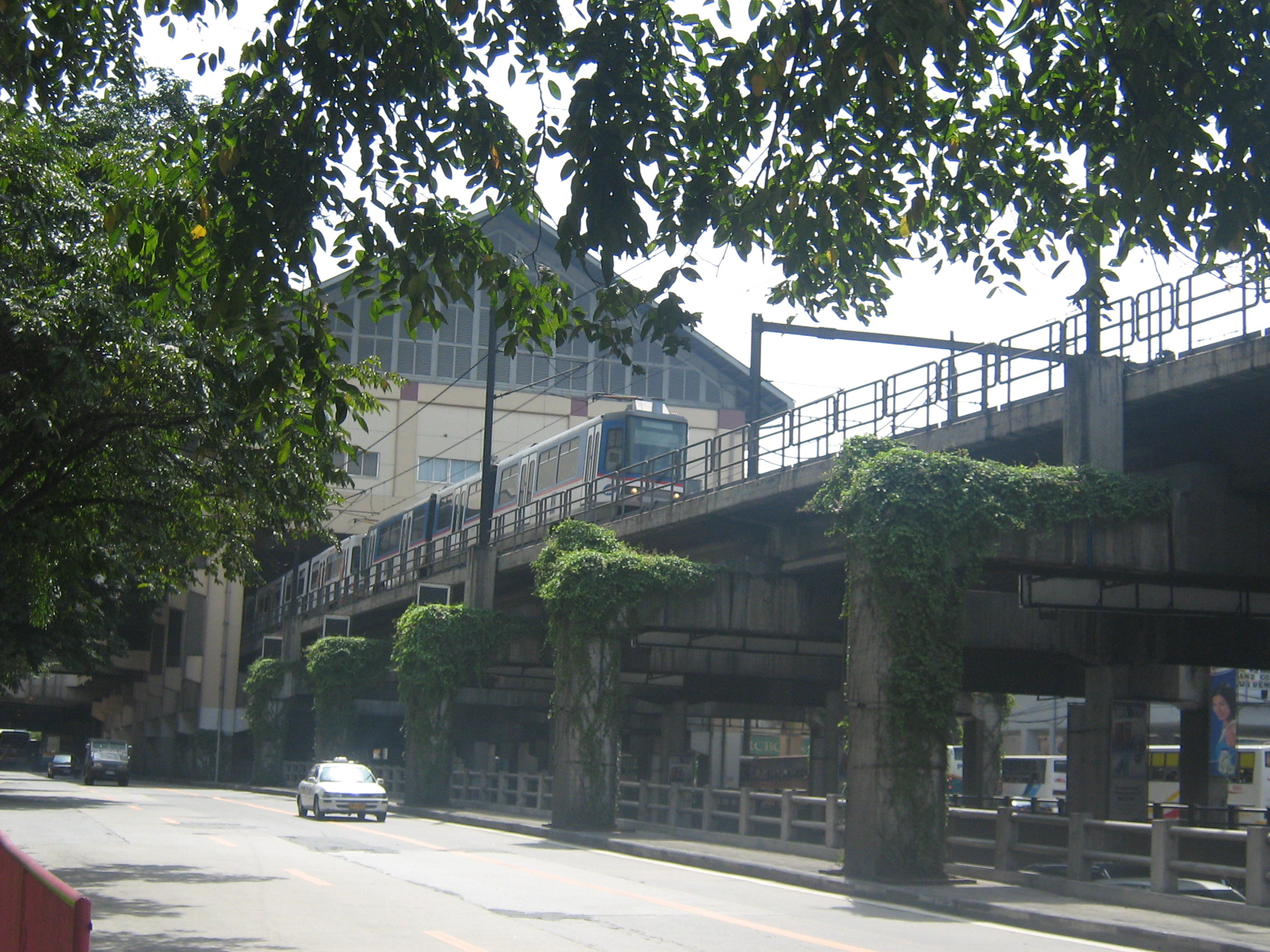
A northbound train leaving Shaw Boulevard station

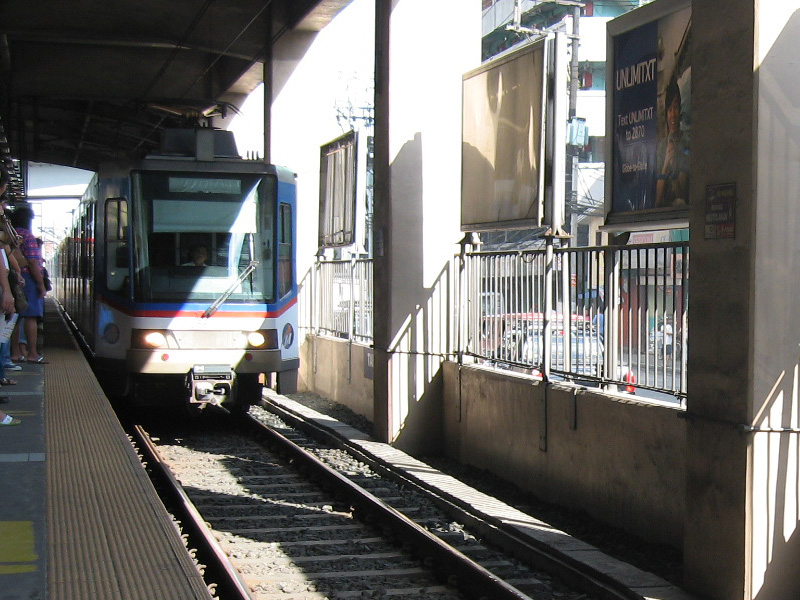
Taft Avenue station platform area

In 1973, the Overseas Technical Cooperation Agency (OTCA; predecessor of the Japan International Cooperation Agency) presented a plan to construct five subway lines in Metro Manila. The study was known as the Urban Transport Study in the Manila Metropolitan Area (UTSMMA). One of the five lines, Line 3, was planned as a 24.3-kilometer (15.1 mi) line along Epifanio de los Santos Avenue (EDSA), the region's busiest road corridor. The plan would have resolved the traffic problems of Metro Manila and would have taken 15 years to complete.

Another study by JICA was presented in 1976 which included the five lines proposed in 1973. The study recommended heavy rail due to the rising population.

During the construction of the first line of the Manila Light Rail Transit System in the early 1980s, Electrowatt Engineering Services of Zürich designed a comprehensive plan for metro service in Metro Manila. The plan—still used as the basis for planning new metro lines—consisted of a 150-kilometer (93 mi) network of rapid transit lines spanning all major corridors within 20 years. The study integrated the previous 1973 OTCA study, the 1976 JICA study, and the 1977 Freeman Fox and Associates study codename MMETROPLAN (Metro Manila Transport, Land Use and Development Planning Project), which was used as the basis for the LRT Line 1.

=== Development and early delays ===
The project was restarted as a light rail project in 1989. DOTC planned to construct a light railway transit line along EDSA, a major thoroughfare in Metropolitan Manila, which would traverse Quezon City, San Juan, Mandaluyong, Makati, and Pasay. The plan, referred to as EDSA Light Rail Transit III (EDSA LRT III), was intended to provide a mass transit system along EDSA and alleviate the congestion and growing transportation problems in the metropolis. On March 3, 1990, a letter of intent was sent by Eli Levin Enterprises, Inc., represented by an Israeli businessman and apparent namesake Elijahu Levin, to the Department of Transportation and Communications (DOTC), now Department of Transportation (DOTr), secretary Oscar Orbos, proposing to construct the EDSA LRT III on a build-operate-transfer (BOT) basis.

On July 9, 1990, President Corazon Aquino signed Republic Act No. 6957, simply known as the Build-Operate-Transfer (BOT) Law; it took exactly three months later. The government then published an invitation to pre-qualify and bid for the project on February 21, 1991. Five groups responded to the invitation: ABB Trazione of Italy, Hopewell Holdings Ltd. of Hong Kong, Mansteel International of Mandaue, Cebu, Mitsui & Co., Ltd. of Japan, and EDSA LRT Consortium, composed of ten foreign and domestic corporations. (Note: The corporations were: Kaiser Engineers International, Inc., ACER Consultants (Far East) Ltd. and Freeman Fox (both later merged with Hyder Consulting), Tradeinvest/ČKD Tatra of the Czech and Slovak Federal Republics, TCGI Engineering All Asia Capital and Leasing Corporation, The Salim Group of Jakarta, E. L. Enterprises, Inc., and A.M. Oreta & Co. Capitol Industrial Construction Group, Inc., and F. F. Cruz & Co., Inc.) EDSA LRT Consortium was the sole firm that passed the pre-qualification process, and submitted its proposal to the DOTC on July 16. The Build-Lease-Transfer (BLT) agreement was signed on November 7.

On September 22, 1992, DOTC and EDSA LRT Corporation signed a revised and restated BLT Agreement. The new BLT Agreement defined the project coverage in two phases: Phase 1, which spanned 16 kilometers (9.9 mi) between North Avenue, Quezon City and Taft Avenue, Pasay, and Phase II, which spanned 5.5 kilometers (3.4 mi) from North Avenue to Monumento, Caloocan. The project was approved by the Cabinet on January 19, 1993. On May 6 of that same year, the project was launched by President Fidel V. Ramos. According to the agreements, the line would use light rail vehicles from the Czech and Slovak Federal Republics and will have a maximum carrying capacity of 450,000 passengers a day, or 150 million a year to be achieved, through 54 such vehicles operating simultaneously. The EDSA LRT III will run at grade, or street level, on the mid-section of EDSA for a distance of 17.8 kilometers (11.1 mi) from F.B. Harrison, Pasay, to North Avenue, Quezon City. The system will have its own power facility. It will also have thirteen (13) passenger stations and one depot on 16-hectare (40-acre) government property at North Avenue.

However, construction could not commence, with the project stalled as the Philippine government conducted several investigations into alleged irregularities with the project's contract. The Supreme Court had a case barring Eli Levin from implementing the project in March 1994, and the bids were ABB and Mitsubishi Corporation, which also wanted to supply contracts. A year later, the Supreme Court upheld the regularity of the project which paved the way for construction to finally begin during the term of President Ramos.

A consortium of local companies, led by Fil-Estate Management was later joined by Ayala Land, and 5 others, later formed the Metro Rail Transit Corporation (MRTC) in June 1995 and took over the EDSA LRT Corporation. The project then became known internally as the Light Rail Transit System (LRTS).

=== Construction and opening ===
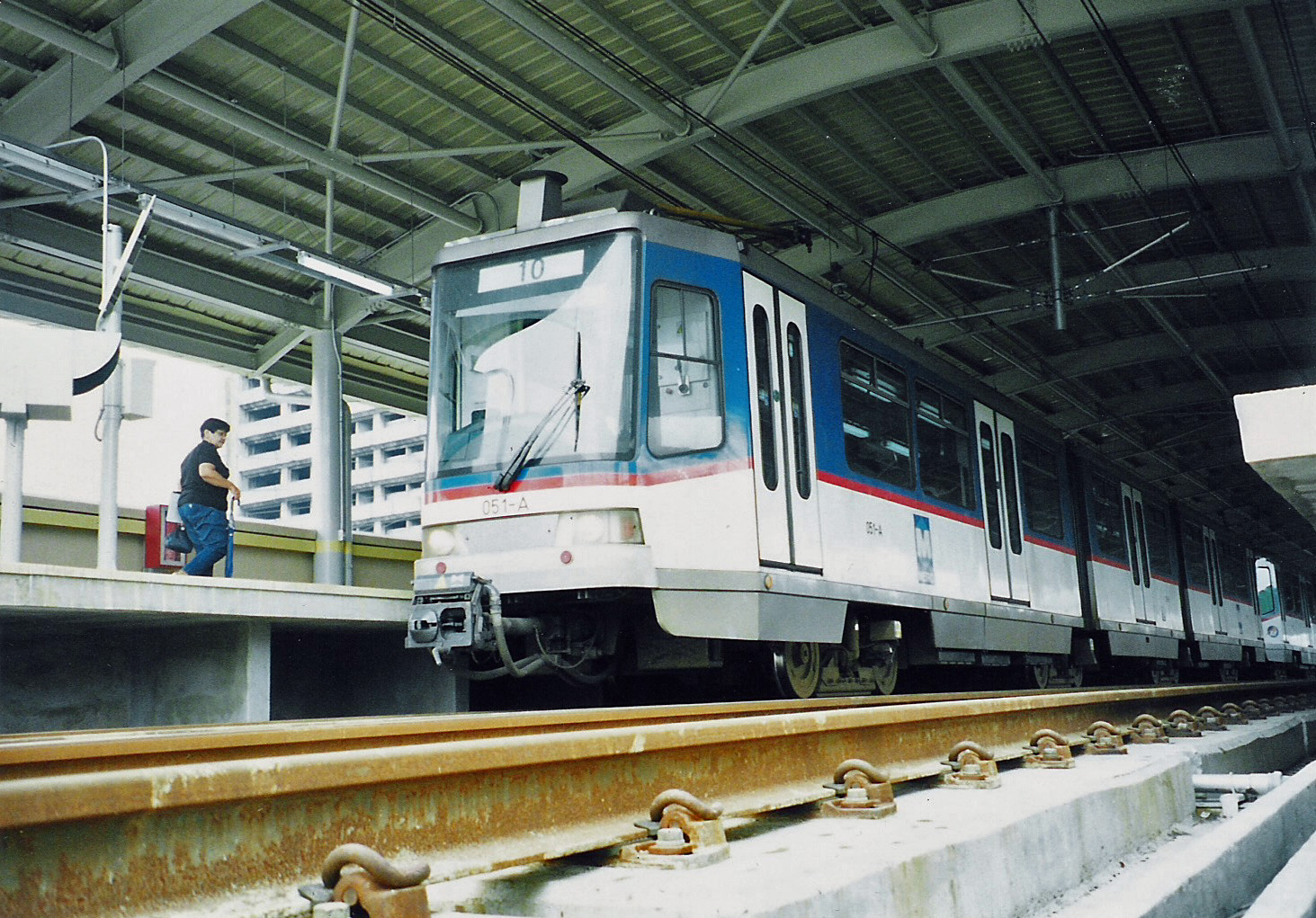
A train at Magallanes station in 2001.

On March 27, 1996, the unveiling marker was attended by President Ramos and others. The MRTC was subsequently awarded a Build-Lease-Transfer contract by the DOTC, which meant that the latter would possess ownership of the system after the 25-year concession period. Meanwhile, the DOTC would assume all administrative functions, such as the regulation of fares and operations, leaving the MRTC responsibility over construction and maintenance of the system as well as the procurement of spare parts for trains. In exchange, the DOTC would pay the MRTC monthly fees for a certain number of years to reimburse any incurred costs.

Construction began on October 15 of the same year, with a BLT agreement signed between the Philippine government and the MRTC. An amended turnkey agreement was later signed on September 16, 1997, with Sumitomo Corporation and Mitsubishi Heavy Industries. Sumitomo and Mitsubishi subcontracted EEI Corporation and AsiaKonstrukt for the civil works. A separate agreement was signed with ČKD Dopravní Systémy (ČKD Tatra, now part of Siemens AG), the leading builder of trams and light rail vehicles for the Eastern Bloc, on rolling stock. MRTC also retained the services of ICF Kaiser Engineers and Constructors to provide program management and technical oversight of the services for the design, construction management, and commissioning. MRTC would later sign a maintenance agreement with Sumitomo and Mitsubishi for the maintenance of the line on December 10 of the same year.

During construction, the MRTC oversaw the design, construction, equipping, testing, and commissioning, while the DOTC oversaw technical supervision of the project activities covered by the BLT contract between the DOTC and MRTC. The DOTC also sought the services of SYSTRA, a French consultant firm, with regards to the technical competence, experience and track record in the construction and operations.

On December 15, 1999, the initial section from North Avenue to Buendia was inaugurated by President Joseph Estrada, with all remaining stations opening on July 20, 2000, a little over a month past the original deadline, due to DOTC's inclusion of additional work orders such as the Tramo flyover in Pasay leading to Ninoy Aquino International Airport.

Initial ridership on the first section fell well below expectations. Passengers complained that the tickets were too expensive, with a maximum fare of ₱34 (equivalent to ₱79.21 in 2021). At the time, this was more costly than a comparable bus ride along the EDSA, or similar rail trips elsewhere on the LRTA and the PNR. Others complained of an excess of stairs, and a lack of connectivity between the stations and other modes of public transportation. The MRTC had projected a daily ridership of 300,000 passengers, but in the first month of operations, the system saw only 40,000 passengers daily. However, patronage steadily grew to an average of 109,000 per day in 2000, and 312,000 per day by 2003. The system was also initially criticized as a white elephant, comparing it to the Manila Light Rail Transit System and the Metro Manila Skyway. To alleviate passenger complaints, the MRTC later reduced passenger fares to ₱15 (equivalent to ₱34.95 in 2021), as per the request of then-President Joseph Estrada and a subsequent government subsidy.

During the line's construction in 2000, Pasay residents raised concerns about the line being constructed at ground level, resulting in the closure of several intersections along EDSA, forcing people to take long detours just to cross EDSA. Residents also complained that they were not properly consulted about the line's construction in their area. The MRTC stated that the segment could not be made as an elevated railway due to the air rights above the LRT-1 already being awarded to the Department of Public Works and Highways for a flyover in 1996.

=== Overcrowding and maintenance problems ===
History and list of maintenance providers
Firm		From	Until
(Japan)	Sumitomo Corporation; Mitsubishi Heavy Industries	December 10, 1997	October 19, 2012
(Philippines)	TES Philippines Inc. (Note: TES Philippines Inc. is the Philippine subsidiary of Mitsubishi Heavy Industries.)	December 10, 1997	October 19, 2012
(Philippines)	PH Trams (Note: Philippine Trans Rail Management and Services Corporation); Comm Builders & Technology	October 20, 2012	September 3, 2013
(Philippines)	Autre Porte Technique Global Inc.	September 4, 2013	July 4, 2015
(Germany)	Schunk Bahn-und Industrietechnik	July 5, 2015	January 7, 2016
(Philippines)	Comm Builders & Technology	July 5, 2015	January 7, 2016
(Philippines) (South Korea)	Busan Universal Rail Incorporated	January 8, 2016	November 5, 2017
(Philippines)	Department of Transportation (Note: Through its Maintenance Transition Team)	November 6, 2017	April 30, 2019
(Japan) (Philippines)	Sumitomo Corporation; TES Philippines Incorporated	May 1, 2019	present

MRTC projected a capacity breach in the system by 2002. By 2004, the line had the highest ridership of the three lines, with 400,000 passengers daily. By early 2012, the system was carrying around 550,000 to 600,000 commuters during weekdays and was often badly overcrowded during peak times of access during the day and night. It operated beyond its original designed capacity until 2019. In 2011, Sumitomo, through TES Philippines, issued a warning about the severe overcrowding situation of the line, in which a failure to immediately upgrade the systems would result in potential damage.

Sumitomo's original maintenance contract was set to expire in June 2010, but was extended four times. On November 17, 2010, MRTC transferred its responsibility of maintaining the system to the DOTC. By the end of Sumitomo's extended contract in October 2012, the DOTC, under the leadership of its secretary Jun Abaya, decided to procure a new maintenance firm. After the DOTC takeover, unloading incidents and train shortages became rampant. On the other hand, the government of Benigno Aquino III had been planning to buy the line from the MRTC; Representative Edgar Erice of Caloocan's 2nd congressional district accused the MRTC of neglecting and not improving the services of the line under its watch.

Following a major train derailment on August 13, 2014, experts from the Mass Transit Railway in Hong Kong audited the MRT-3 two weeks after the incident. In November, the MTR reported that the line's performance was "unsatisfactory". The Philippine Senate, in February 2016, released a report stating that Abaya and other DOTC officials "may have violated" the Anti-Graft and Corrupt Practices Act in relation to questionable contracts with the subsequent maintenance providers. In a Senate report on the results of the MTR audit, DOTC officials were reported to be involved in graft in relation to questionable contracts, especially those for the maintenance of the line.

The DOTC tried to bid out a three-year maintenance contract in October 2014 and January 2015, but both biddings failed. Through a negotiated procurement, the Busan joint venture, consisting of Busan Transportation Corporation, Edison Development & Construction, Tramat Mercantile Inc., TMICorp Inc., and Castan Corporation was awarded the three-year contract by the DOTC. The contract started in January 2016 and was slated to end by January 2019. In 2017, DOTC's succeeding agency, the Department of Transportation (DOTr) attributed the operation's disruptions of the rail system to the Busan joint venture, later known as Busan Universal Rail, Inc. (BURI), with DOTr Transport Undersecretary for Rails Cesar Chavez noting 98 service interruptions and 833 passenger unloadings (or average of twice daily) as well as train derailments in April–June 2017. BURI insisted that the disruptions the railway line was experiencing is due to "inherent design and quality concerns" and not to poor maintenance or normal tear or wear. It said that glitches started occurring since 2000, a claim that MRTC dismissed when Sumitomo was maintaining the system. The maintenance contract was terminated on November 6, 2017.

=== Capacity expansion ===
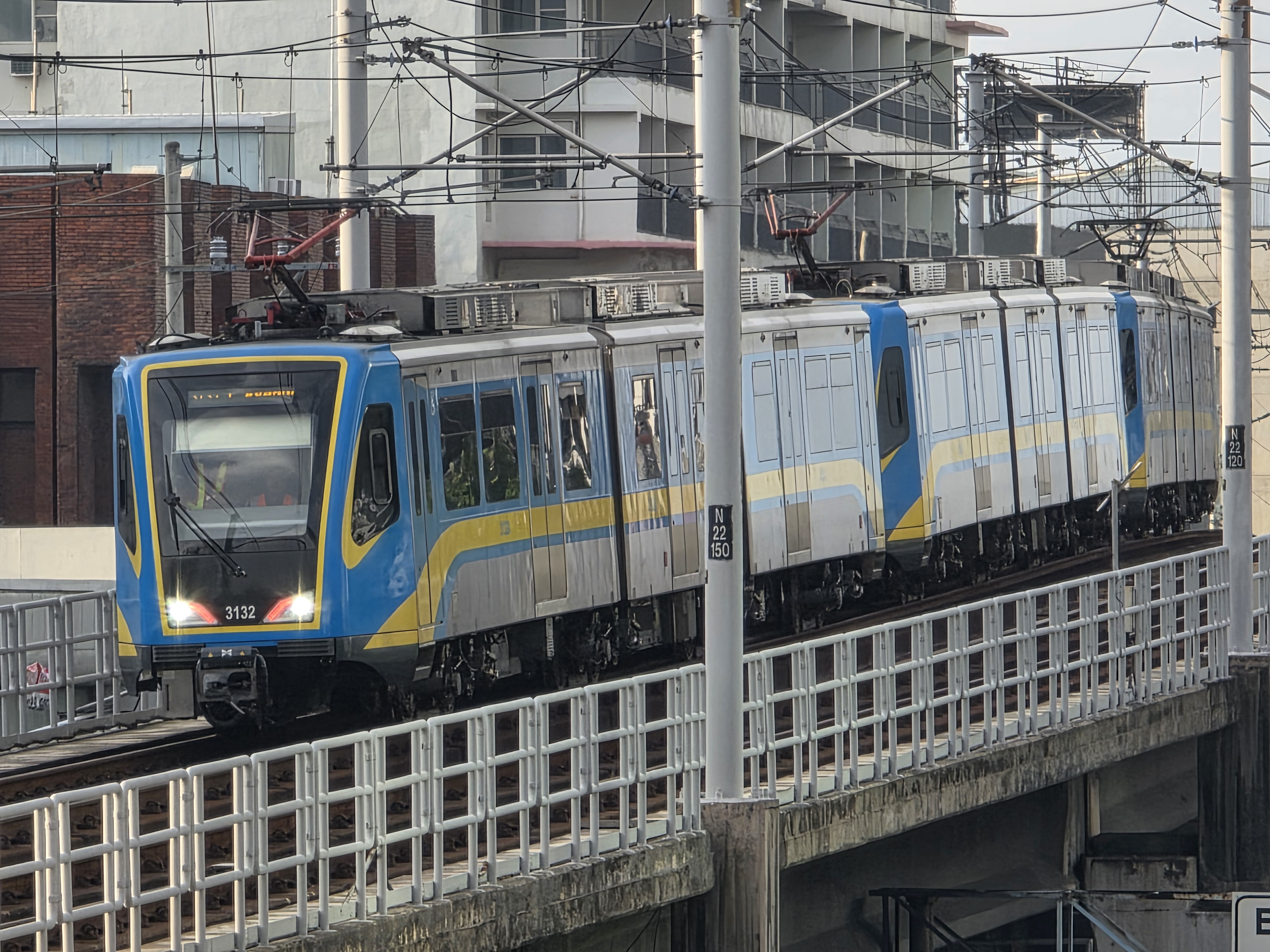
Additional trains were procured under the capacity expansion project.

Part of the capacity expansion is the conversion of three-car trains to four-car trains with increased capacity. Four-car trains have signages in the front driving cabs to guide passengers.

Due to the high ridership of the line, a proposal under study by the DOTC and NEDA proposed to double the current capacity by acquiring additional light rail vehicles to accommodate over 520,000 passengers a day.

In January 2014, the DOTC procured an additional 48 light rail vehicles from CRRC Dalian, which entered service in 2016. However, several issues and controversies prevented the trains from mainline operations; CRRC Dalian agreed in 2018 to amend the train specifications to match the contract terms at no cost. Due to the trains undergoing the said adjustments, they were slowly introduced into regular operations, which led to the start of the gradual deployment on October 27, 2018.

Aside from the procurement of the new trains, the capacity expansion project included the upgrading of the ancillary systems such as the power supply, overhead lines, the extension of the pocket track near Taft Avenue station and the modification of the turn back siding north of the North Avenue station. The original plan also included the upgrading of the signaling system. These upgrades would only be realized as part of the line's rehabilitation.

Plans were also laid to increase the number of cars in each train set, from the current three cars to four, which also increases the number of passengers being accommodated for each trip, from 1,182 to 1,576. This was first mentioned in 2013, during the bidding process for the new trains. However, in January 2016, an anonymous railway expert warned that the power supply at that time was not capable of handling four-car trains. Despite this, four-car operations were first tested in a Dalian train in May 2016. After the rehabilitation of the line which included the upgrading of the power supply, a dynamic test run for the use of four-car trains for regular operations was conducted on March 9, 2022. Regular four-car operations began on March 28, initially deploying two trains for daily operations, subsequently increased to four. Although full conversion was initially planned to be achieved by 2023, all trains soon reverted to the existing 3-car configuration. Four-car operations returned on April 21, 2025, with three four-car trains being deployed during peak hours, later increased to six by October 17. Plans were laid for full four-car operations in the long run, as well as the full deployment of the CRRC Dalian trains, to increase ridership capacity to 800,000 passengers.

=== Rehabilitation ===
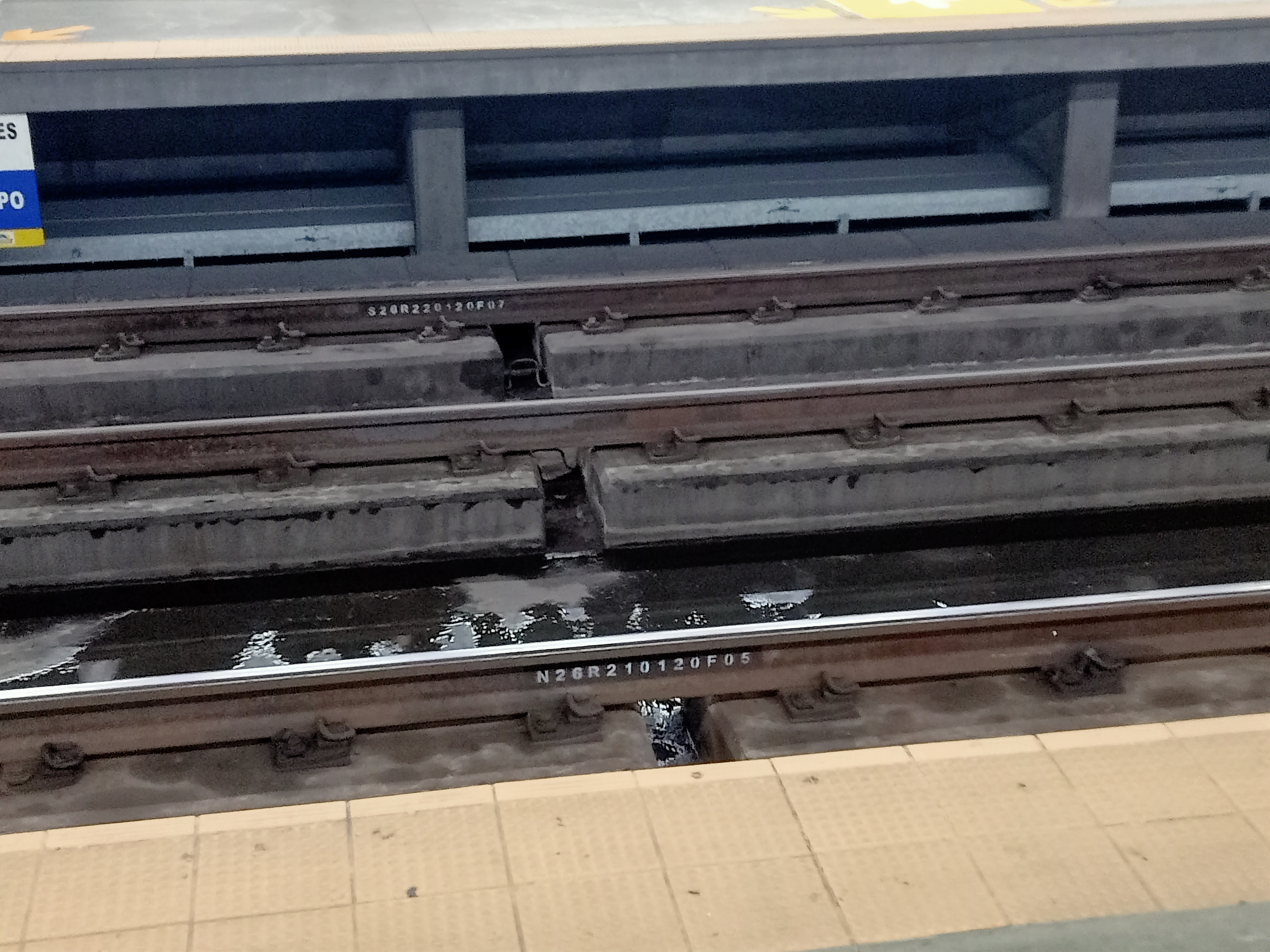
A vital aspect of the rehabilitation of the line was the replacement of worn-out rails.

As early as 2011, proposals were laid to rehabilitate the line. An unsolicited proposal was made by Metro Pacific Investments in 2011 at a cost of ₱25.1 billion; MPIC submitted a revised proposal in 2014 at a cost of ₱23.3 billion. In 2017, in the wake of various daily service interruptions in the line, San Miguel Corporation expressed its interest to rehabilitate the line. That same year, Metro Pacific submitted another ₱20 billion proposal to rehabilitate, operate and maintain the line. These proposals however would be rejected by the government.

Following the termination of the maintenance contract with Busan Universal Rail, Inc., the DOTr announced on November 29, 2017, that a government-to-government agreement between the Philippines and Japan would be signed by the end of that year, paving the way for Sumitomo Corporation to return as the maintenance provider. The ₱22 billion project, partly funded by a ₱18 billion loan from the Japan International Cooperation Agency, was approved by the Investment Coordination Committee (ICC) board of the National Economic and Development Authority (NEDA) on August 17, 2018. It intended to rehabilitate and upgrade the existing systems and trains, for the line to return to its original high-grade design.

On November 8, 2018, the Philippine and Japanese governments signed the loan agreement for the line's rehabilitation after both governments exchanged notes the previous day. The rehabilitation and maintenance contract was signed by the DOTr and Sumitomo on December 28. Originally scheduled to start in January 2019, delays in the implementation of the national budget for the 2019 fiscal year caused consequent delays, as around four billion pesos would be sourced from the government.

On May 1, 2019, Sumitomo Corporation, Mitsubishi Heavy Industries Engineering (MHIENG), and TES Philippines assumed the role as maintenance provider for the MRT Line 3, beginning a rigorous rehabilitation process. Under the 43-month contract, rehabilitation works were to be done within 26 months. It covers the overhaul of all MRTC Class 3000 vehicles, (Note: The overhauls were carried out during most of the entire duration of the contract (originally 43 months) and not the initial 26-month rehabilitation period.) repairs on the escalators and elevators, rail replacement, upgrades on the signaling and communication systems, power supply, overhead systems, maintenance and station equipment. After the rehabilitation, a 17-month maintenance contract would be undertaken by the Japanese firms. The contract, originally scheduled to end by December 31, 2022, was extended to May 31, 2023.

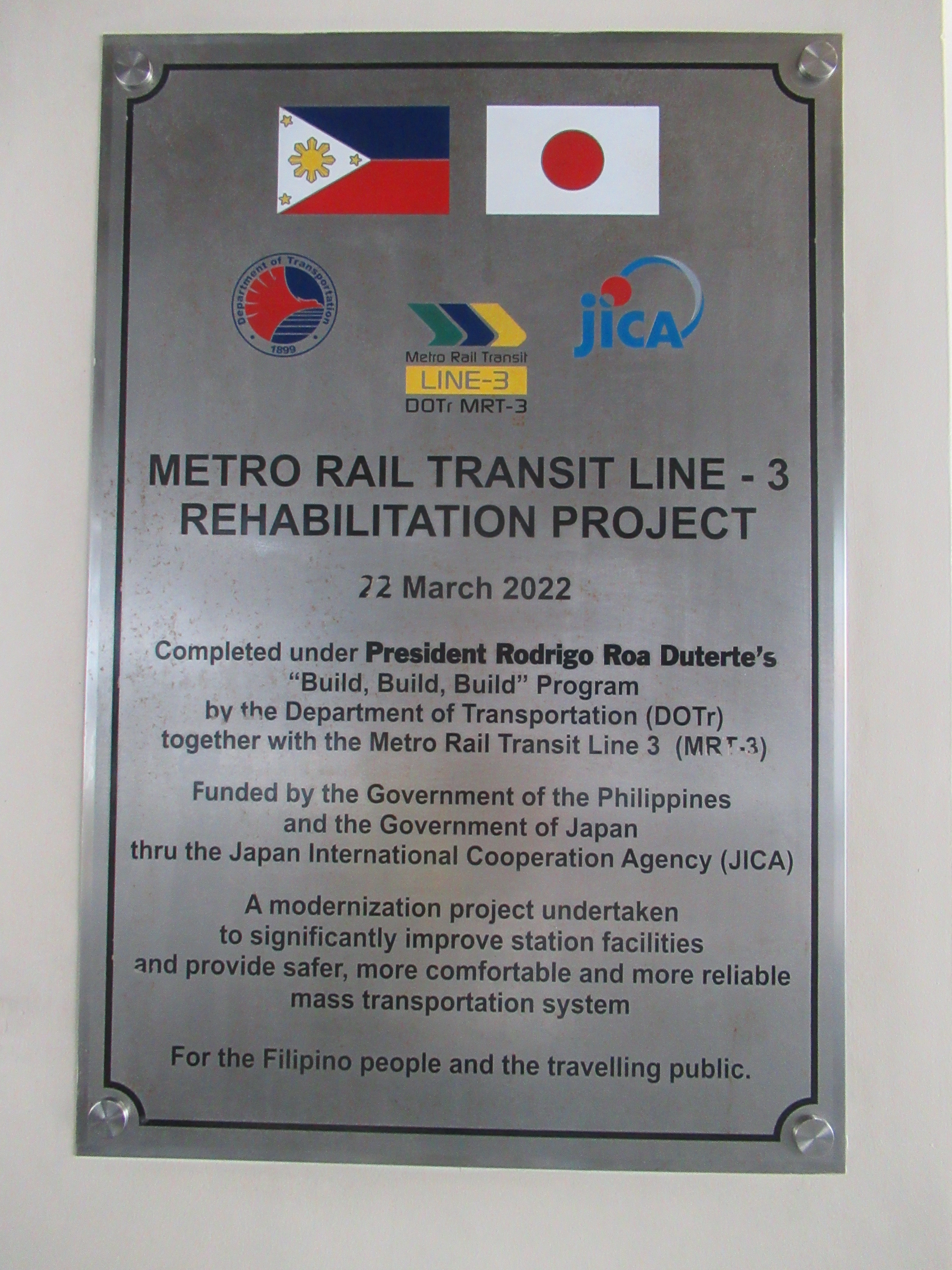
Commemorative plaque to mark the completion of the rehabilitation project at Quezon Avenue station.

The rehabilitation was originally scheduled to be completed by July 2021. However, delays brought by the COVID-19 pandemic caused revised timelines. The project was completed in December 2021, as announced by Transportation Secretary Arthur Tugade on February 28, 2022. On March 22, President Rodrigo Duterte and Secretary Tugade inaugurated the newly rehabilitated line at a completion ceremony held at Shaw Boulevard station. As part of its completion, free rides were offered initially for a month to combat inflation, but was extended for an additional two months.

On May 26, 2023, a ₱6.9 billion loan was signed by the governments of the Philippines and Japan and for the second phase of the project, covering the line's continued maintenance and its connection to the North Triangle Common Station with the lines that would interchange at that station. Four days later, DOTr and Sumitomo signed a contract to extend the latter's maintenance until July 31, 2025. Under the extended contract, the existing three-car trains would be expanded to four cars to cater the increase in passenger demand. Additionally, the pocket track near Taft Avenue station was extended to accommodate longer four-car trains, with construction works taking place from November 2024 to April 2025. The program aims to increase the line's ridership capacity to 500,000 passengers a day.

On September 12, 2025, the DOTr extended Sumitomo's contract again for an additional two years. JICA subsequently extended another loan worth ₱8.1 billion, which was signed by both governments on February 4, 2026.

== Route ==
Route of MRT Line 3

The lines run along the alignment of EDSA from North Avenue in Quezon City to the intersection of EDSA and Taft Avenue in Pasay, forming in a semi-orbital line. The rails are mostly elevated and erected either over or along the roads covered, with cut and underground sections between Buendia and Ayala stations, the only underground stations on the line. The rail line serves the cities of Pasay, Makati, Mandaluyong, San Juan and Quezon City. The line crosses Osmeña Highway and South Luzon Expressway (SLEX) at Magallanes Interchange in Makati.

=== Stations ===
The line has 13 stations along its 16.9-kilometer (10.5 mi) route, spaced on average around 1.3 kilometers (0.81 mi) apart. The southern terminus of the line is Taft Avenue at Pasay Rotonda, the intersection between Epifanio de los Santos Avenue (EDSA) and Taft Avenue, while the northern terminus is the North Avenue along EDSA in Barangay Bagong Pag-asa, Quezon City. Three stations serve as connecting stations with the lines of the Manila Light Rail Transit System (LRT) and Philippine National Railways (PNR). The Magallanes station is near PNR's EDSA station, while Araneta Center–Cubao is indirectly connected to the LRT Line 2 station of the same, and Taft Avenue is connected via a covered walkway to the LRT Line 1 EDSA station. No stations are connected to other rapid transit lines within the paid areas.

MRT Line 3 stations timeline
Date opened	Project	Stations
December 15, 1999	Phase 1	North Avenue – Buendia
July 20, 2000	Phase 1	Ayala – Taft Avenue
2027	North Extension	North Triangle

Legend
†	Existing terminus
†	Future terminus

List of stations
Station Code	Station Name	Distance (km)		Connections	Location
Station Code	Station Name	Between stations	Total	Connections	Location
YL00	North Triangle †	—	—	Interchange with Manila LRT Interchange with Manila MRT Out-of-station interchange with Manila MRT: MMS North Avenue	Quezon City
YL01	North Avenue †	—	0.000	EDSA Carousel: 1 North Avenue; Bus routes: 18 33 64 SM North EDSA	Quezon City
YL02	Quezon Avenue	1.200	1.200	Interchange with Manila MRT: MMS Quezon Avenue; EDSA Carousel: 1 Quezon Avenue; Quezon City Bus Service: 6 EDSA	Quezon City
YL03	GMA–Kamuning	1.000	2.200	EDSA Carousel: 1 Kamuning; Quezon City Bus Service: 3 EDSA	Quezon City
YL04	Araneta Center–Cubao	1.900	4.100	Out-of-station interchange with Manila LRT: Araneta Center–Cubao; Bus routes: 3 Gateway Mall; 51 53 61 Farmers Plaza; Quezon City Bus Service: 1 Araneta City	Quezon City
YL05	Santolan–Annapolis	1.500	5.600	EDSA Carousel: 1 Santolan	Quezon City
YL06	Ortigas	2.300	7.900	Interchange with Manila MRT: 4 EDSA; EDSA Carousel: 1 Ortigas; Bus routes: 2 Robinsons Galleria	Mandaluyong
YL07	Shaw Boulevard	0.800	8.700	none	Mandaluyong
YL08	Boni	1.000	9.700	none	Mandaluyong
YL09	Guadalupe	0.800	10.500	EDSA Carousel: 1 Guadalupe; Pasig River Ferry Service: Guadalupe Ferry Station	Makati
YL10	Buendia	2.000	12.500	EDSA Carousel: 1 Guadalupe; Bus Routes: 17 42 Buendia MRT	Makati
YL11	Ayala	0.950	13.450	EDSA Carousel: 1 Ayala; BGC Bus: EX01 L01 N01 NR17 NR01 W01 WR01 WR18 EDSA-Ayala; Bus Routes: 10 11 12 17 38 40 42 45 46 59 One Ayala; 62 63 EDSA-Ayala	Makati
YL12	Magallanes	1.200	14.650	Out-of-station interchange with PNR: NSCR EDSA; Bus Routes: 11 12 38 40 45 46 59 Magallanes; 62 63 EDSA-Ayala	Makati
YL13	Taft Avenue †	2.050	16.700	Out-of-station interchange with Manila LRT: EDSA; EDSA Carousel: 1 Taft Avenue	Pasay
Stations, lines, and/or other transport connections in italics are either under construction, proposed, unopened, or have been closed.

=== Operations ===
The line is open daily from 4:30 a.m. PHT (UTC+8) and closes at 11:30 p.m. during weekdays, and 10:30 p.m. on weekends. It operates almost every day of the year unless otherwise announced. Special schedules are announced via the public address system in every station and also in newspapers and other mass media. During Holy Week, a public holiday in the Philippines, the line is closed for annual maintenance, owing to fewer commuters and traffic around the metro. Normal operation resumes on the first working day after Easter Sunday. During the Christmas season, operating hours are usually extended on the days leading up to Christmas Day, but are shortened on Christmas Eve and New Year's Eve to allow its staff to celebrate the holidays with their families.

It has experimented with extended opening hours, the first of which included 24-hour operations beginning on June 1, 2009 (primarily aimed at serving call center agents and other workers in the business process outsourcing sector). Citing low ridership figures and financial losses, this was suspended after two days, and operations were instead extended from 5:00 a.m. to 1:00 am. Operations subsequently returned to the former schedule by April 2010, (Note: 5:30 a.m. until 11:00 p.m. on weekdays, and 5:30 a.m. until 10:00 p.m. during weekends and holidays) but services were again extended starting March 10, 2014, with trains running on a trial basis from 4:30 a.m. to 11:30 p.m. in anticipation of major traffic buildup in light of several major road projects beginning in 2014.

Responding to a commuter's concern on X (formerly Twitter) about the limited operating hours at night, the Department of Transportation (DOTr) explained in August 2023 the need for timely maintenance works, since any delays would affect other portions of the line for the next trips. The DOTr added that unlike the extensive railway systems of Europe and Japan, where 24-hour operations are possible, the MRT system only consists of one line. The department also claimed that if maintenance is not ensured, the line would "slowly deteriorate".

On March 17, 2025, in the aftermath of the line's inspection by Transportation Secretary Vince Dizon, he asked the line's management to extend its operations. Before the current operating hours were implemented, train services ended an hour earlier. The extended operating hours, which took effect on March 24, is aimed at reducing long lines during the evening peak hours. The DOTr also plans to deploy more trains along the line to serve more passengers.

== Station facilities, amenities, and services ==
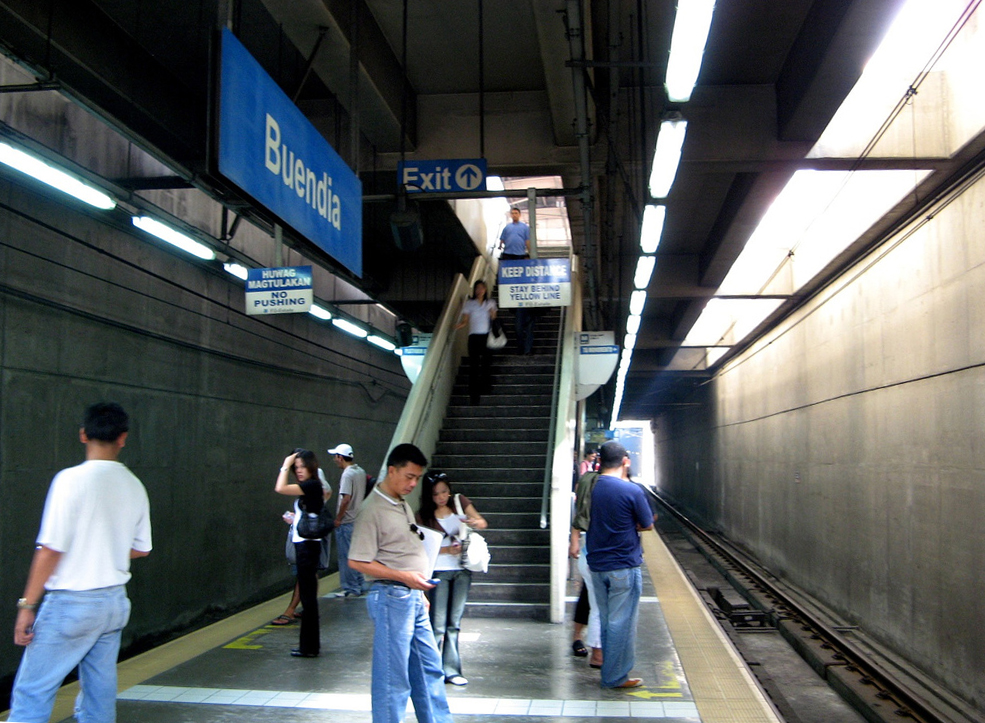
Buendia station, one of the stations with an island platform.

The entrance to Ayala station as seen from the Ayala Center in August 2012

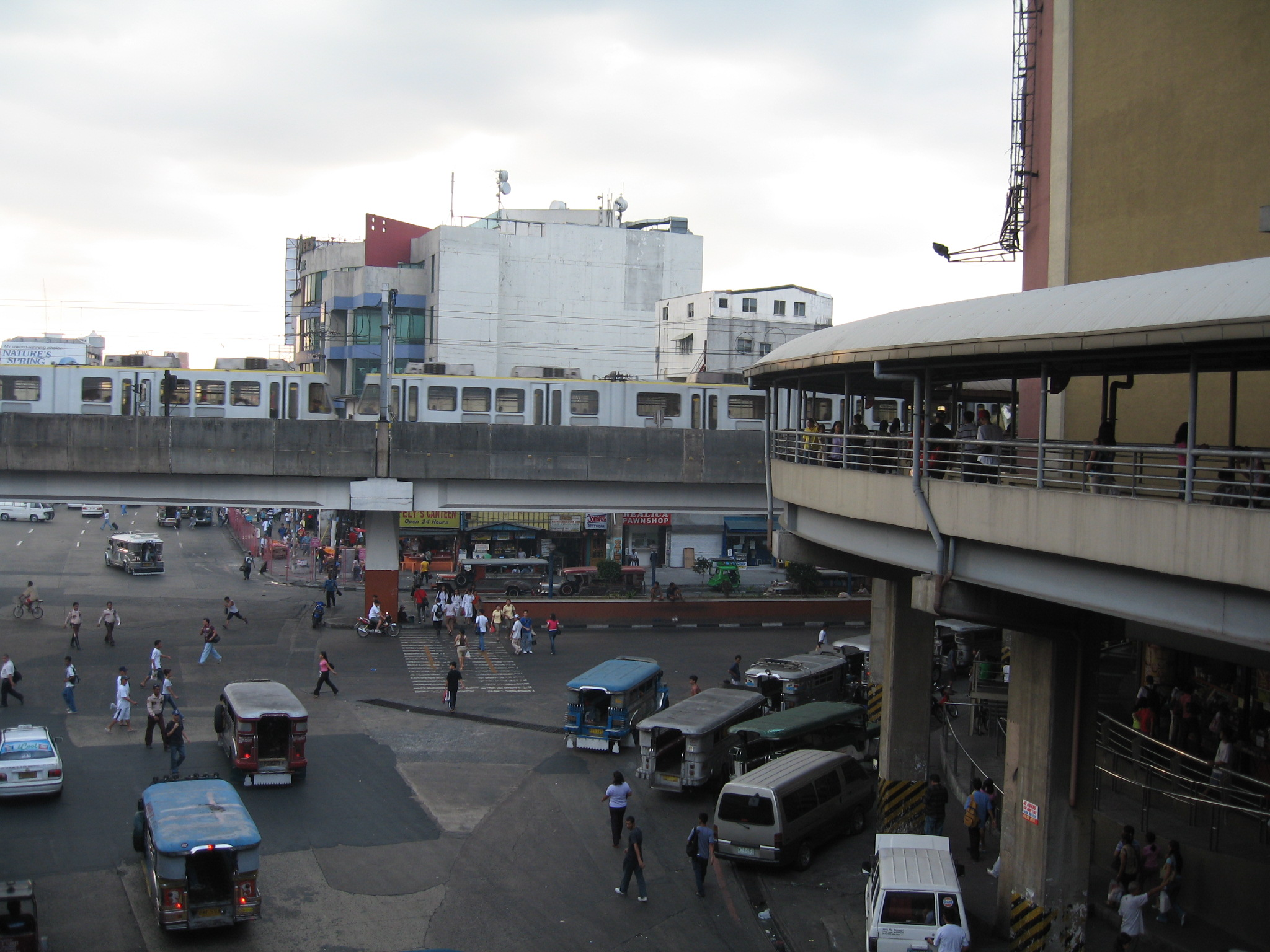
Bridge linking the Taft Avenue station to the nearby EDSA LRT station

=== Station layout and accessibility ===
The stations have a standard layout, with a platform level and a concourse level. The concourse is usually above the platform, with stairs, escalators and elevators leading down to the platform level. However, fare gates are located at the platform level in most stations, meaning that commuters will need to exit the paid area to catch a train going in the opposite direction. Switching trains without paying a new fare is only possible at the Araneta Center–Cubao, Boni, Buendia, Ayala, and Taft Avenue stations due to their different layout.

The station platforms have a standard length of 130 meters (426 ft 6 in), designed to accommodate trains with four cars. The stations are also designed to occupy the entire span of EDSA, allowing passengers to safely cross between one end of the road and the other.

Most stations are also barrier-free inside and outside the station, and trains have spaces for passengers using wheelchairs. With the exception of Buendia and Ayala stations, and the platform level of Taft Avenue and Boni stations, all stations are situated above ground, taking advantage of EDSA's topology.

Stations either have side platforms, which is the case for most stations, or island platforms, such as Taft Avenue. Due to the very high patronage of the line, before the pandemic, part of the platform corresponding to the first car of the train is cordoned off for the use of senior citizens, pregnant women, children who are below 4 feet (1.2 m) and age seven, and disabled passengers. Since 2021, the first two doors of the first car of the train have been allotted as a priority section for the aforementioned passengers.

The line has a total of 46 escalators and 34 elevators across all 13 stations. Prior to the rehabilitation, only few escalators and elevators were operational. The escalators and elevators were rehabilitated as part of the rehabilitation of the line. The project started in June 2019 and was completed on August 20, 2020.

In February 2012, the line allowed folding bicycles to be brought into trains provided that the wheels do not exceed more than 20 inches (51 cm) in diameter.

Platform screen doors were also planned for each station, with the plans for the platform doors were laid out as early as 2013, however, these plans were delayed until it was reconsidered in 2017.

=== Shops and services ===
Some stations are connected at concourse level to nearby buildings, such as shopping malls, for easier accessibility. Inside the concourse of all stations are stalls or shops where people can buy food or drinks. Stalls vary by station, and some have fast food stalls. Stations such as North Triangle (Ayala Malls Vertis North, SM North EDSA, and Trinoma), Quezon Avenue (Centris Station Mall), Araneta Center—Cubao (Ali Mall, Farmers Plaza, Gateway Mall), Isetann Cubao, and SM Araneta City), Ortigas (Robinsons Galleria Ortigas, SM Megamall and The Podium), Shaw Boulevard (Greenfield District Pavilion, Shangri-La Plaza, and Starmall Shaw), Guadalupe (Guadalupe Commercial Complex), Ayala (Glorietta, Greenbelt, Landmark Makati, One Ayala, and SM Makati), Magallanes (Southgate Mall), and Taft Avenue (Metro Point Mall) are connected to or are near shopping malls and/or other large shopping areas, where commuters are offered more shopping varieties.

It is also accessible to major transport terminals in Metro Manila such as Araneta City Bus Port and other provincial bus terminals within EDSA—Cubao area via Araneta Center—Cubao, Parklea via Shaw Boulevard, Guadalupe Jeep Terminal via Guadalupe, One Ayala via Ayala, Pasay Rotonda via Taft Avenue, and the upcoming North Triangle Common Station.

Since November 19, 2001, in cooperation with the Philippine Daily Inquirer, passengers have been offered copies of the Inquirer Libre, a free, tabloid-size, Tagalog version of the Inquirer, which is available at all stations. In 2014, Pilipino Mirror also started distributing free tabloid newspapers.

== Safety and security ==
The line's safety was affirmed in a 2004 World Bank paper prepared by Halcrow, describing the overall state of metro rail transit operations in Manila as being "good". However, since the DOTr took over maintenance of the train system in 2012, the safety and reliability of the system has been questioned, with experts calling it "an accident waiting to happen." While several incidents and accidents were reported between 2012 and 2014, they did not deter commuters from using the system. The Philippine government, meanwhile, continues to assert that the system is safe overall despite those incidents and accidents.

In 2014, government officials have admitted that capacity and system upgrades were overdue, although the DOTr has never acted on the numerous capacity expansion proposals of the private owners. In the absence of major investment in improving system safety and reliability, DOTr has resorted to experimenting with and implementing other solutions to reduce strain on the system, including crowd management on station platforms and the proposed implementation of peak-hour express train service. However, some of these solutions, such as platform crowd management, are unpopular with passengers.

For safety and security reasons, persons who are visibly intoxicated, insane and/or under the influence of controlled substances, persons carrying flammable materials and/or explosives, and persons carrying bulky objects or items over 1.5 meters (4.9 ft) tall and/or wide are prohibited from entering the line. Products in tin cans are also prohibited on board, citing the possibility of home-made bombs being concealed inside the cans.

In late 2000 and early 2001, in response to the Rizal Day bombings and the September 11 attacks, security was increased. Following a vandalism incident in May 2021, the number of security personnel deployed across all stations was increased and a patrol car was deployed for added security. After a bomb threat incident on September 8, 2023, DOTr formed an inter-agency task force to enhance security across all transportation sectors. Units of the Philippine National Police and security police provided by private companies can be found in all stations. All stations have a head guard. Some stations may also have a deployed K9 bomb-sniffing dog. The line also employs the use of closed-circuit television inside all stations to monitor suspicious activities.

Pets have been allowed to ride since July 12, 2021, but these must be placed inside a carrier bag before boarding a train.

== Ridership ==
The original designed ridership of the line is 350,000, yet as the years passed, the number doubled from 450,000 daily passengers in 2006–2007 to 490,000 passengers in 2008 and up to 500,000 passengers from 2010 to 2012, with record numbers reaching as high as 620,000 from 2012 to 2013, before declining to 560,000 in 2014. The high ridership of the line is due to the time consumed when commuting via EDSA, as well as the speed of the trains reaching up to 60 kilometers per hour (37 mph), and connectivity to Metro Manila's major transport hubs, railway lines, and central business districts, which results to a reduced commuting travel time and an increase in ridership. The daily ridership of the line can reach as much as 300,000 to 500,000 passengers from 2012 to 2016, despite poor maintenance and long lines, causing the government to launch bus services, known as MRT Buses, around its stations, to serve as alternatives for 900,000 to 1 million passengers. In addition to the rising daily ridership that continues to exceed the line's designed capacity, and as the government continues to implement the metro line's capacity expansion project, it aims to reach a ridership of 800,000 daily passengers as all of the new trains from China will be added to its current fleet.

Ridership declined in 2015 to 327,314, lower than the 464,871 recorded in 2014. It slightly increased in 2016, to 370,036, and the highest recorded daily ridership was recorded at 517,929 in December of that year. However, ridership started to decline by 2017 due to poor maintenance and daily incidents, which continued through 2018 and 2019. A significant drop in ridership was recorded in 2020 due to capacity limitations brought by the COVID-19 pandemic, serving 70,000 to 150,000 passengers daily.

Ridership slightly increased in 2021, at 136,935 average daily passengers, and after the completion of the line's rehabilitation in 2022, ridership further increased to 273,141. For a three-month period, the line offered free rides to 28.6 million commuters, averaging 318,055 riders daily. Since 2024, the line's ridership continues to rise to its pre-pandemic levels, as the railway line served a daily average of 375,474 passengers that year. Following the implementation of the 50% discounted fares on March 23, which was aimed to help reduce the impact of rising fuel costs due to the 2026 Iran war, the line recorded a total ridership of 12,975,661 passengers, averaging a total of 350,693 passengers throughout the 37-day period. On August 12, 2026, the line recorded its highest total of passengers for the year at 492,597 passengers, which included 72,723 passengers that availed for free train rides for National ID Card holders. The record was broken on September 17, 2026, where the line recorded a total of 503,031 passengers. On October 21, 2026, the line reached a new highest total number of passengers for the year at 506,904 passengers.

=== Statistics ===
Data from the Department of Transportation (DOTr).

View source data.
View source data.

Key
†	Highest recorded ridership

Year	Daily average	% change	Annual ridership	% change	Highest single-day ridership
1999 (Note: Data from December 16 to 31, 1999.)	23,057	Steady	368,916	Steady	39,760 (December 23, 1999)
2000	109,449	▲374.69	39,401,465	▲10,580.34	296,969 (December 22, 2000)
2001	250,728	▲129.08	90,262,148	▲129.08	391,187 (December 14, 2001)
2002	282,993	▲12.87	102,443,564	▲13.50	417,059 (July 1, 2002)
2003	312,043	▲10.27	112,647,474	▲9.96	438,809 (December 19, 2003)
2004	338,431	▲8.46	122,512,169	▲8.76	452,926 (December 16, 2004)
2005	356,673	▲5.39	128,758,894	▲5.10	465,203 (September 7, 2005)
2006	374,436	▲4.98	135,171,387	▲4.98	488,733 (December 15, 2006)
2007	395,806	▲5.71	142,886,057	▲5.71	539,813 (December 21, 2007)
2008	413,220	▲4.40	149,585,563	▲4.69	527,530 (October 15, 2008)
2009	419,728	▲1.57	151,521,764	▲1.29	560,637 (September 15, 2009)
2010	424,041	▲1.03	153,078,770	▲1.03	552,509 (October 15, 2010)
2011	439,906	▲3.74	158,806,049	▲3.74	577,015 (October 14, 2011)
2012	481,918	▲9.55	174,454,146	▲9.85	622,880 (August 17, 2012) †
2013	487,696 †	▲1.20	176,058,278 †	▲0.92	621,913 (October 25, 2013)
2014	464,871	▼4.68	167,818,336	▼4.68	614,807 (February 14, 2014)
2015	327,314	▼29.59	118,160,484	▼29.59	455,164 (February 25, 2015)
2016	370,036	▲13.05	133,952,890	▲13.37	517,929 (December 16, 2016)
2017	388,233	▲4.92	140,152,161	▲4.63	506,001 (February 10, 2017)
2018	289,654	▼25.39	104,275,362	▼25.60	390,325 (January 12, 2018)
2019	270,794	▼6.51	96,932,972	▼7.04	359,447 (January 25, 2019)
2020	121,839	▼55.01	31,799,959	▼67.19	324,803 (January 24, 2020)
2021	136,935	▲12.39	45,675,884	▲43.64	223,739 (December 23, 2021)
2022	273,141	▲99.47	98,330,683	▲115.28	389,784 (June 17, 2022)
2023	357,198	▲30.77	129,030,158	▲31.22	450,298 (August 22, 2023)
2024	375,474	▲5.1	135,885,336	▲5.3	469,930 (December 20, 2024)
2025	392,317	▲4.49	141,626,536	▲4.23	519,318 (December 10, 2025)

== Fares and ticketing ==
The line, like all other lines in Metro Manila, uses a distance-based fare structure, with fares ranging from 13 to 28 pesos (24 to 51 U.S. cents), depending on the destination. Commuters who ride the line are charged ₱13 ($0.26) for the first two stations, ₱16 ($0.32) for 3–4 stations, ₱20 ($0.41) for 5–7 stations, ₱24 ($0.49) for 8–10 stations and ₱28 ($0.57) for 11 stations or the entire line. Children below 1.02 meters (3 ft 4 in) (the height of a fare gate) may ride for free.

Fares are free of charge every March 8 (International Women's Day; free rides exclusive for women), June 12 (Independence Day), and December 30 (Rizal Day) on limited time slots.

The line, along with the LRT Line 2 and Philippine National Railways lines also offered free rides to students starting July 1, 2019, but students must register to avail a student pass. However, the free rides for students stopped in 2020 due to the COVID-19 pandemic as distance learning was implemented as a mode of learning during the pandemic. With the shift towards the return of physical face-to-face classes, a plan to return the free rides to students by August 2022 was announced; however, free rides for students were only limited to the LRT Line 2 due to more losses that the government will incur as a consequence of the free rides (Line 2 itself later stopped the free rides after three months due to similar reasons).

As mandated by law, senior citizens and persons with disabilities are entitled to a twenty-percent discount. Since June 20, 2025, students get a higher fare discount of fifty percent, followed by senior citizens and PWDs on July 16, and are valid until 2028. The Trade Union Congress of the Philippines, meanwhile, called on the government to implement the same discount for workers whose salaries are under the minimum wage.

=== Types of tickets ===
The design of the single journey ticket prior to introduction of Beep card in 2015.

==== Magnetic tickets (1999–2015) ====
Two types of tickets exist: a single-journey (one-way) ticket whose cost is dependent on the destination, and a stored-value (multiple-use) ticket for 100 pesos. The 200-peso & 500-peso stored-value tickets were issued in the past, but have since been phased out. The single-journey ticket is valid only on the date of purchase. Meanwhile, the stored-value ticket is valid for three months from date of first use.

The tickets come in several incarnations: these include tickets bearing the portraits of former presidents Joseph Estrada and Gloria Macapagal Arroyo, which have since been phased out, and one bearing the logos of the DOTC and the MRTC. Ticket shortages are common: in 2005, the MRTC was forced to recycle tickets bearing Estrada's portrait to address critical ticket shortages, even resorting to borrowing stored-value tickets from the LRTA and even cutting unusable tickets in half for use as manual passes. Shortages were also reported in 2012, and the DOTC was working on procuring additional tickets in 2014. Because of the ticket shortages, it had become common practice for regular passengers to purchase several stored-value tickets at a time, though ticket shortages still persist.

Although it has partnered with private telecommunications companies in experimenting with RFID technology as an alternative ticketing system in the past, these were phased out in 2009.

==== Beep cards (2015–present) ====
Currently, inter-operable beep cards with similar-to-the-previous single-journey and stored-value ticket types are now issued, along with the deployment of brand-new ticketing machines that replaced the barely-used ticketing machines that has been in place since the line's inauguration. The beep, tap-and-go tickets, loadable up to ₱10,000, became available to use in all stations of the line on October 3, 2015.

A shortage of the stored value cards was reported in 2022 due to the global chip shortage caused by the Russian invasion of Ukraine.

==== Cashless options (2025–present) ====
"Fast Lane" turnstiles were launched on July 25, 2025. These turnstiles accept cashless payments to ease queuing at ticket booths. At the moment, one turnstile at every station accepts payments from credit cards, debit cards, and digital wallets, with the goal of upgrading all turnstiles in the line in the future according to DOTr Secretary Vince Dizon.

These converted turnstiles have inadvertently removed Beep Card compatibility, which is now being addressed. Plans are underway to introduce these payment methods to LRT-1 and LRT-2, with the rollout aimed for 2026.

=== Fare adjustment ===
Adjusting passenger fares was ordered by President Joseph Estrada as a means to boost flagging ridership figures, and the issue of fares both historically and in the present day continues to be a contentious political issue involving officials at even the highest levels of government.

Current fare levels were set on January 4, 2015, as a consequence of DOTr (formerly DOTC) having to increase fares for LRT Line 1 as per their concession agreement with MPIC-Ayala, with fare hikes delayed for several years despite inflation and rising operating costs. Prior to the current fares levels, fares were set on July 15, 2000, under the orders of then President Estrada; this was intended to have the line become competitive against other modes of transport, but had the effect of causing revenue shortfalls which the government shouldered. While originally set to last only until January 2001, the new fare structure persisted due to strong public opposition against increasing fares, especially as ridership increased significantly after lower fares were implemented. In 2022, when the line waived its fares, ridership also increased. These lower fares—which are only slightly more expensive than jeepney fares—ended up being financed through large government subsidies amounting to around ₱45 per passenger, and which for both the MRT and LRT reached ₱75 billion for the 10-year period between 2004 and 2014. Without subsidies, the cost of a single trip is estimated at ₱60, and a ₱10 increase in fares would yield additional monthly revenues of ₱2–3 billion a month.

Passenger fare subsidies are unpopular outside Metro Manila, with subsidy opponents claiming that their taxes are being used to subsidize Metro Manila commuters without any benefit to the countryside, and that the fare subsidies should be used for infrastructure improvements in the rest of the country. In his 2013 State of the Nation Address, President Benigno Aquino III claimed that it would be unfair for non-Metro Manila residents to use their taxes to subsidize the LRT and MRT. However, supporters of the subsidies claimed that the rest of the country benefits economically from efficient transportation in Metro Manila.

In January 2023, a petition was filed for a ₱4–6 fare hike due to a major net loss incurred; in 2022, the incurred revenue was only ₱1.11 billion against expenditures of roughly ₱8.97 billion, resulting in a loss of ₱7.86 billion. In the petition, the MRT-3 management said that fare revenues were never enough to compensate the MRTC to cover the initial investment in the construction, operations, and maintenance of the line. Although the fare hike was initially set for the first quarter of 2024, Transportation Secretary Vince Dizon deferred plans for such and instead focused on service improvements.

== Rolling stock ==
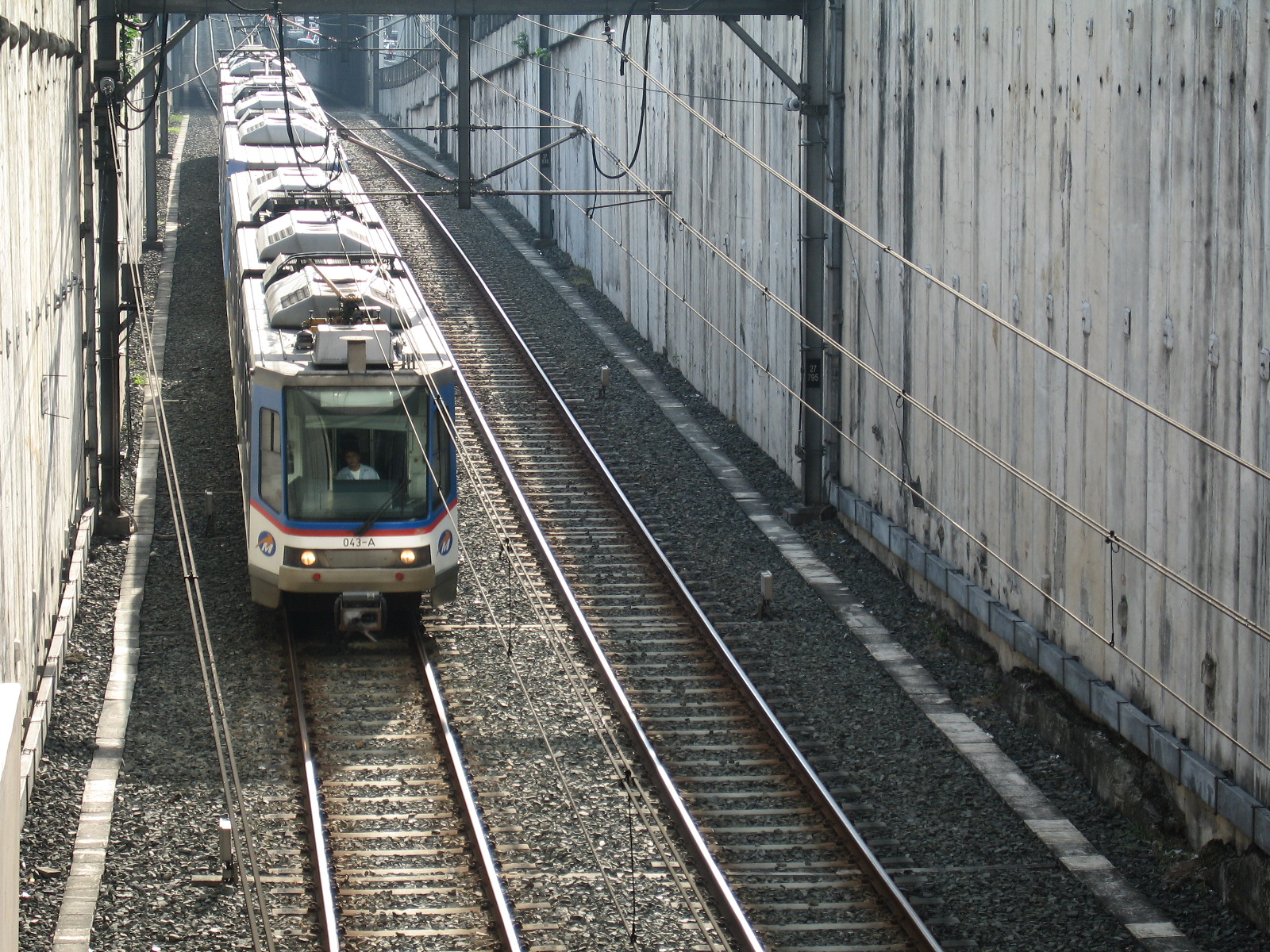
A Class 3000 train approaching Ayala station

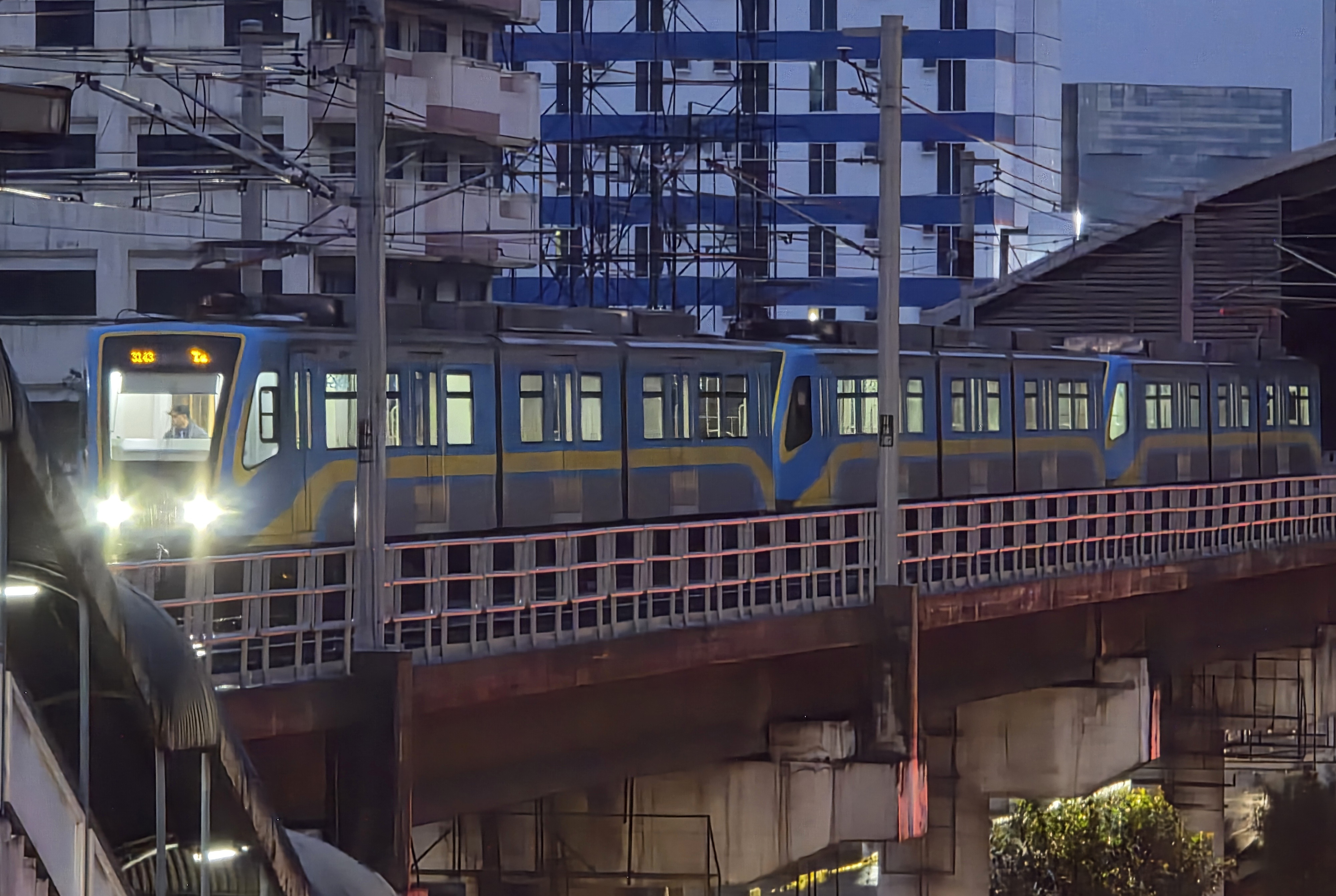
A Class 3100 train at North Avenue station

The line runs light rail vehicles (LRV) in a regular three-car configuration. Four-car trains began operating by March 2022, although most trains remain running in three cars. The DOTr planned to convert all three-car trains to four-car trains by 2023. Two train types run in the line, the latest being those purchased from CRRC Dalian, under the Aquino administration.

The line has a total of 121 light rail vehicles. 73 of which were made in the Czech Republic by ČKD (now part of Siemens AG) and were purchased with export financing from the Czech government. One ČKD train car was damaged following a derailment of a train in 2014. Another 48 were made by CRRC Dalian in China that were purchased at a cost of ₱3.8 billion. These operate in a three-car configuration with a total capacity of 1,182 passengers, expandable to 1,576 with an additional car. It is designed to carry in excess of 23,000 passengers per hour per direction (PPHPD), and is expandable to accommodate 48,000 passengers per hour per direction.

The plans for new rolling stock has been an issue for the MRT during the Aquino administration under DOTC's leadership of then Secretary Joseph Emilio Abaya, with plans to acquire 52-second-hand LRVs offered from Madrid Metro in Spain with a budget of ₱8.43 billion, along with a proposal from Inekon Trams in 2013. However, undisclosed issues and train incompatibility issues regarding the project, the project was downgraded to 48 LRVs, with the contract having CRRC Dalian supply 48 new LRVs. The deployment of the Dalian trains was delayed due to several factors, including weight limits on existing tracks and inconsistencies in production, which has since been corrected. On October 27, 2018, DOTr started the gradual deployment of the 2nd-generation trains. Although deployed erratically between 2019 and September 2025, the DOTr plans to redeploy the trains in December 2025.

The trains are designed to run at a maximum speed of 65 kilometers per hour (40 mph), but currently run at an operating speed of 60 km/h (37 mph), though some areas are limited to 40 km/h (25 mph) like turnouts.

The Passenger Assist Railway Display System (PARDS), a passenger information system powered by LCD screens installed near the ceiling of the train that shows news, advertisements, current train location, arrivals and station layouts, are already installed inside the first-generation trains. PARDS is also installed on trains on LRT lines 1 and 2.

=== Depot ===
The line maintains an underground depot in Quezon City near North Avenue station. Above the depot is TriNoma, a shopping mall owned by the Ayala Corporation. The depot occupies 84,444 square meters (908,950 sq ft; 8.4444 ha) of space and serves as the center of operations and maintenance. It is connected to the mainline through a spur line. The depot is capable of storing 81 light rail vehicles, with the option to expand to include 40 more vehicles as demand arises. They are parked on nine sets of tracks, which converge onto the spur route and later on to the main network. However, a lot of rail tracks for storage inside the depot owned by MRTC were taken by DOTC (now DOTr) to repair broken rails, as DOTC's previous maintenance provider did not purchase spare rails. These rails have since been replaced during the rehabilitation done along the entire line by Sumitomo.

== Other infrastructure ==
=== Signaling ===
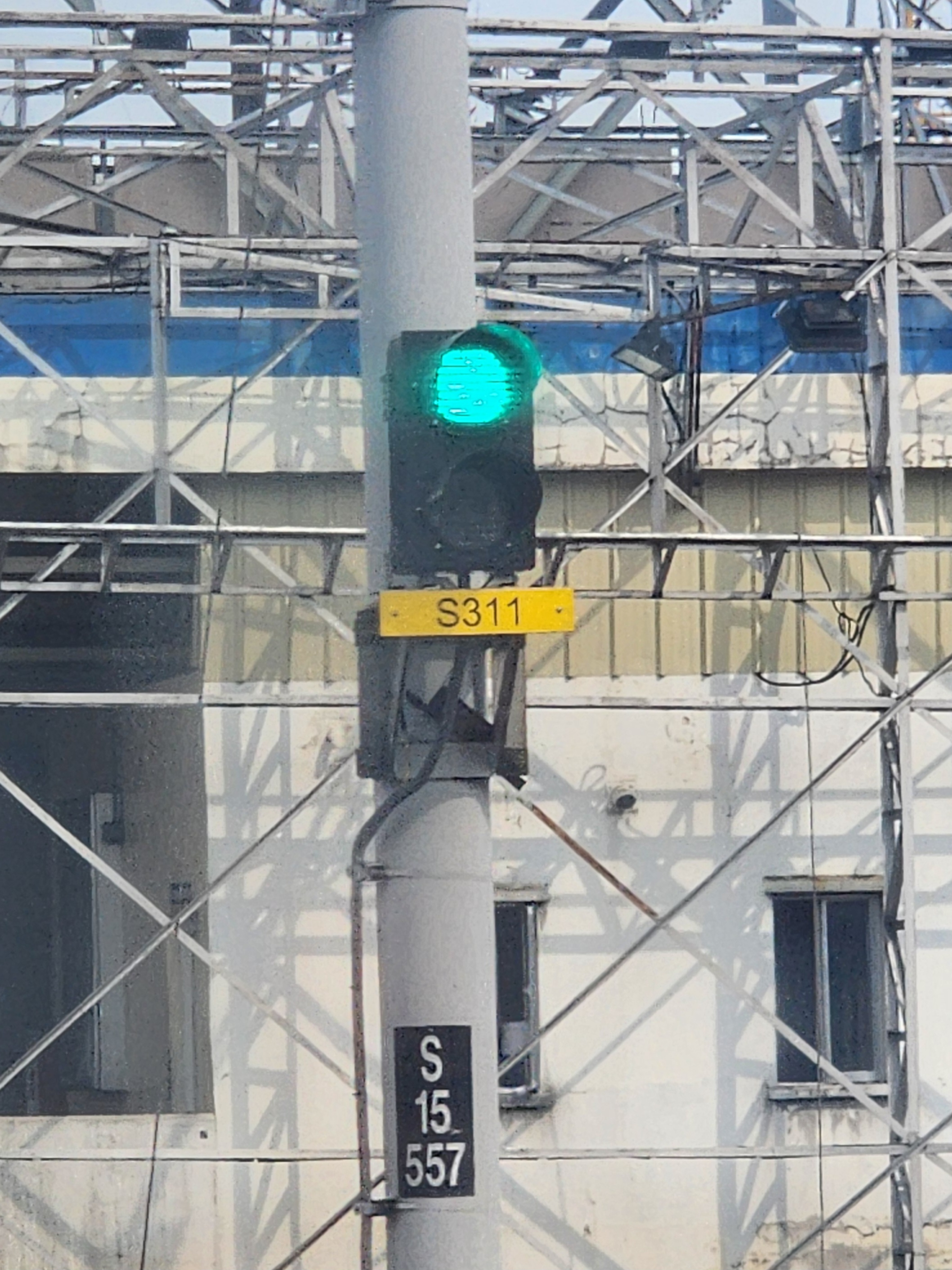
Two-aspect signal lights at Quezon Avenue station

The line uses the CITYFLO 250 fixed block signaling solution supplied by Alstom (formerly Bombardier Transportation), designed for light rapid transit operations with on-board automatic train protection (ATP) system on trains. Other components include train detection using track circuits, EBI Screen 900 centralized traffic control, and computer-based interlocking.

Adtranz, later Bombardier Transportation, designed and supplied the original signaling system and maintained it from 2000 to 2012. The firm owns the proprietary rights to supply new components for the system. In October 2015, Bombardier was awarded the contract to upgrade the system's local control system. The seven-month upgrade replaced the MAN 900 local control system with the newer EBI Screen 900 system with modern computers and fiber optic technology.

The previous maintenance providers failed to properly maintain the signaling system and used non-original spare parts to save costs. This in turn, caused many problems within the system which became among the top three causes of frequent service interruptions. On February 9, 2018, the Department of Transportation (DOTr) signed a memorandum of understanding (MoU) with original equipment manufacturer Bombardier Transportation to upgrade the system and procure the spare parts. Included in the MoU was a two-year maintenance contract that was later cancelled in May 2019 due to the rehabilitation program which included the maintenance of the signaling system by Sumitomo.

The 2019–2021 upgrade covered the replacement of copper cables with fiber optic cables, installation of 71 new signal lights, new interlocking equipment, new point machines, new track circuits (including tuning units which form part of the circuits), and other wayside equipment. Works continued during the acquisition of Bombardier Transportation by Alstom in January 2021. The upgraded system was commissioned on October 24, 2021.

=== Tracks ===
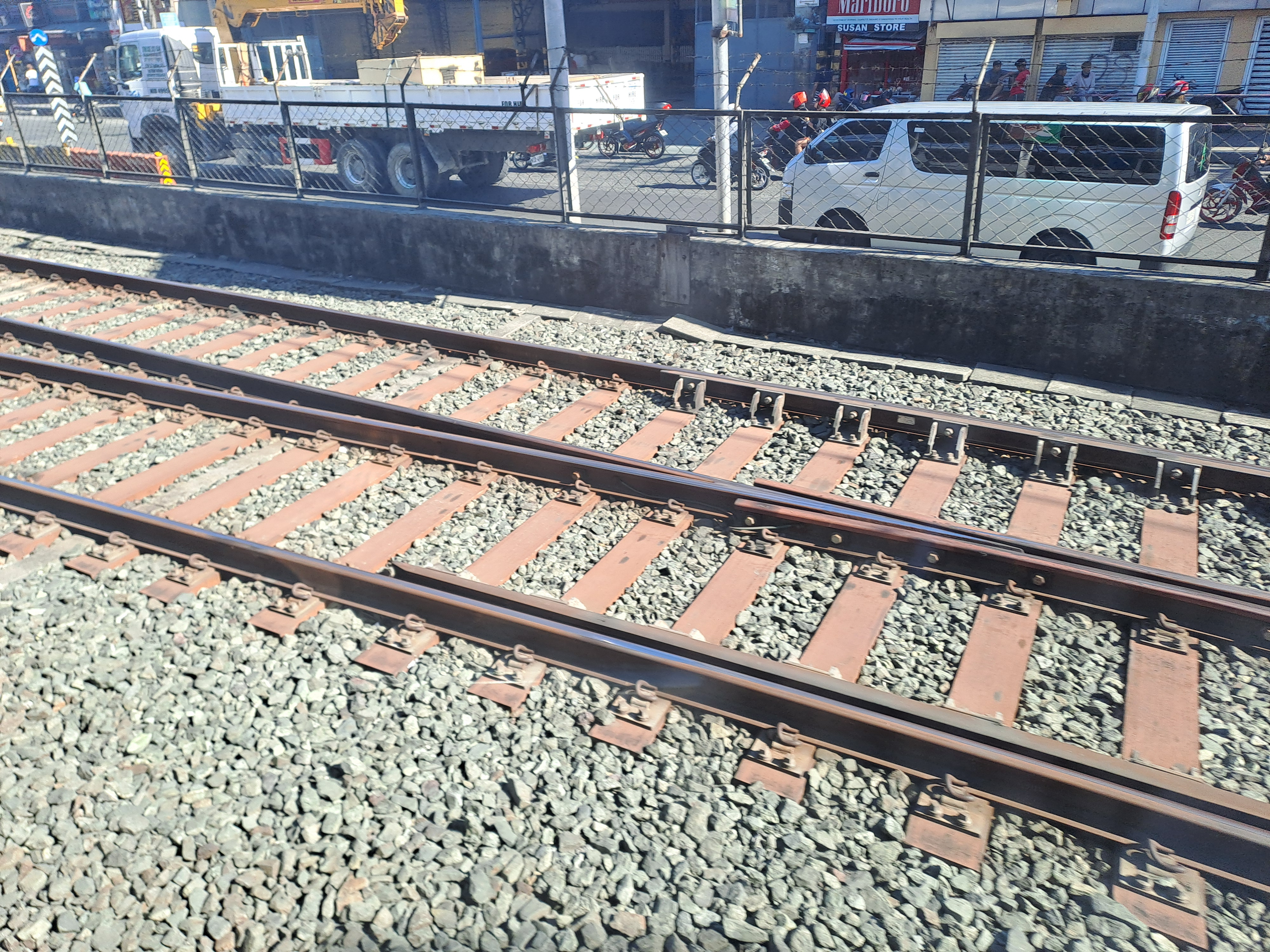
Turnout and new railway sleepers near Taft Avenue station

The standard gauge tracks consist of 54-kilogram-per-meter (36 lb/ft) rails designed to the UIC 54 rail profile, which are welded together to form a continuous welded rail. Some rails located at turnouts have fishplates bolted at the ends of the rail. These are laid on sections of the line with ballasted and concrete plinth sections. Sections with track ballast are located on at-grade sections and the underground portion of the line (except Buendia and the turnouts south of the station), while plinth sections are located at elevated sections of the line. The tracks on ballasted sections are supported by concrete sleepers. The rehabilitation of the line led to the introduction of fiber-reinforced foam urethane (FFU) railway sleepers. FFU sleepers are found at the depot and the turnouts near Taft Avenue station.

Plans to replace the rail tracks were laid in 2015. Replacement works in certain sections of the line were conducted in February and March of that year. In January 2015, the joint venture of Jorgman, Daewoo, and MBTech Group was awarded the ₱61.5 million contract for the major replacement works. The joint venture supplied 7,296 pieces of 12-meter (39 ft) rails.

By 2014, speed restrictions were imposed due to safety concerns, which downgraded the operating speed from 60 km/h (37 mph) to 40 km/h (25 mph), and in 2017 was further downgraded to 30 km/h (19 mph). A comprehensive rail replacement program started on November 4, 2019, in which 4,053 pieces of 18-meter (59 ft) rails assembled by Nippon Steel Corporation in Fukuoka were used. Rail replacement works were initially suspended during the enhanced community quarantine in Luzon, but works resumed in April 2020 and the replacement was fast-tracked. Originally scheduled for completion by February 2021, it was completed in September 2020, five months ahead of schedule. The turnouts near Taft Avenue station were repaired in October and November 2020. The 60 km/h (37 mph) speed was achieved on December 7, 2020, in the aftermath of replacement works.

== Plans and proposals ==
=== Privatization ===
In November 2022, the Department of Transportation said that it is considering to privatize the operations and maintenance of the line to enhance efficiency, reduce operating costs, and keep fares affordable. The rail lines assets will remain owned by the government, similar to the LRT Line 1. Such a plan was announced as early as 2017. However, privatization plans did not continue. With the support of the Asian Development Bank and the Public-Private Partnership Center, the proposal was reconsidered, with consultations set for May 14, 15, and 18.

=== Line merge with LRT Line 1 ===
Although Phase 1 of the line (Taft Avenue to North Avenue) has already been built, the original route envisioned by the government was for it to traverse most of EDSA (from Monumento to Taft Avenue), eventually meeting with the LRT Line 1 at Monumento in Caloocan (Phase 2) to create a seamless rail loop around Metro Manila. The total length of the planned extension was 5 kilometers (3.1 mi).

A study about the integration of Metro Manila's railway network, published by JICA in 2001, proposes the through-operation of both LRT-1 and the MRT-3, which would have interoperability to create a seamless loop around the region. The trains would start from Monumento before turning back to the mainline of LRT 1 at Pasay Rotonda.

The expansion was shelved by then President Gloria Macapagal Arroyo in favor of the LRT Line 1's extension from Monumento to a new common station that it will share with at North Avenue, thus closing the loop. The National Economic and Development Authority, as well as President Arroyo have said that the link at North Avenue is a national priority, since it would not only provide seamless service between the LRT Line 1 and MRT Line 3 but would also help decongest Metro Manila. It was estimated that by 2010, when the extension is completed, some 684,000 commuters would use the line every day from the present 400,000, and traffic congestion on EDSA would be cut by as much as 50%.

Proposals to fully unite LRT-1 and MRT-3 operations and systems have been pitched but has not been pursued so far. Feasibility tests for this proposition included LRT-1 trains visiting MRT 3 depot facilities and running them on the entire line. Even if the structure gauge connecting the two rail lines has been successfully tested, commuters have to go down at Fernando Poe Jr. station of LRT Line 1 and walk over or take a tricycle or jeepney for the 1-kilometer (0.62 mi) distance to the North Avenue station of MRT Line 3. In 2011, the Department of Transportation and Communications (precursor to the DOTr), under Transportation Secretary Jose de Jesus, launched an auction for a temporary five-year operations and maintenance contract for the two lines; the bidding was set for July. Over twenty-four companies expressed interest to bid which included Ayala Corporation, Bombardier Transportation, CAF, Metro Pacific, Sumitomo Corporation, Siemens, DMCI Holdings, San Miguel Corporation, and others. De Jesus later resigned from the DOTC in June for personal reasons, and his successor, Mar Roxas, halted the auction process and was later shelved.

The proposal to integrate the LRT Line 1 and MRT Line 3 was revived in June 2024 by Metro Pacific Investments. The company, which holds a majority stake in LRT Line 1 operator Light Rail Manila Corporation, submitted an unsolicited proposal to integrate the operations of the two lines. It is now under review by DOTr and has been endorsed to the former by the PPP Center, after initially rejecting it due to being incomplete in substance. The proposed line merger will run both LRT-1 and MRT-3 trains on the same track, while resolving outstanding issues such as the Dalian trains, supply chain and potential line expansion.

=== Extension proposals ===
==== Southern and western extension ====
In the 1999 Metro Manila Urban Transportation Integration Study, the line was proposed to extend all the way to Navotas, which is only 10 kilometers (6.2 mi), and another one to the reclamation area (known as Bay City) in about 2 kilometers (1.2 mi). The line was also intended to extend all the way to Kawit.

In a feasibility study in 2009 and in 2015, launched by Japan International Cooperation Agency, along with the Department of Transportation, the Transport and Traffic Planners (TTPI) Inc. and other Japanese and local railway officials, launched a plan to extend the present MRT line's southern end, by constructing a 2.2-kilometer (1.4 mi) at-grade and underground segment, from Taft Avenue station to the SM Mall of Asia complex. Plans were also laid out to add another station, by traversing through Macapagal Boulevard and linking the line to the Parañaque Integrated Terminal Exchange, therefore adding another 3.1 kilometers (1.9 mi) to the main line. The study also included a planned 7.2-kilometer (4.5 mi) extension to the northern and western cities of Navotas, Southern Caloocan, and Malabon, which is also included to the planned merging project with the LRT Line 1, and connecting it to the North–South Commuter Railway.

Due to the numerous problems surrounding the project, such as right-of-way and cost issues, the government decided to presumably scrap the extension plans, and look for alternatives instead, such as the planned Integrated Pasay Monorail project by the Pasay City LGU and SM Investments, starting from the Taft Avenue station to SM Mall of Asia.

==== Makati Loop ====
In the initial stages of the construction of the transit line, a proposal was formulated for a supplementary rail extension that would traverse from Buendia station to the Gil Puyat station of the LRT-1, situated between Ayala and Buendia stations. The sole existing trace of this discontinued proposal is an underground tunnel extending from Buendia to Ayala stations, taking a rightward trajectory towards Ayala Avenue, before running towards Gil Puyat Avenue. Despite sporadic references, there is presently no intention to reassess or reinstate this abandoned initiative.

==== NAIA extension ====
In 2000, during the completion of the line, MRTC proposed an idea to build the extension of the line to Ninoy Aquino International Airport (NAIA), running from Taft Avenue station, then passing along Roxas Boulevard, and ending at this airport. The project was expected to cost ₱500 million. However, the project is likely shelved in favor of an spur line extension to NAIA Terminal 3 via the under-construction Metro Manila Subway.

=== Transfer of operations from MRTC to LRTA ===
A new study for the Metro Manila Rail Network has been unveiled by DOTC Undersecretary for Public Information Dante Velasco that LRT 1, LRT 2, and MRT 3 will be placed under the management of the Light Rail Transit Authority (LRTA). This is due to maintenance cost issues for LRT 1's maintenance cost, which is approximately ₱35 million, along with LRT Line 2's ₱25 million and MRT Line 3's ₱54 million maintenance costs. Another reason for this study is for the unification of the lines. According to DOTC Undersecretary for Rails Glicerio Sicat, the transfer was set by the government in June 2011. However, it is unlikely that the private owners, MRTC, will approve this plan.

On January 13, 2011, LRTA Administrator Rafael S. Rodriguez took over as officer-in-charge of the line in preparation for the integration of operations of the three lines, but with the entry of a new leadership into the DOTC that year and in 2012, the transfer was deemed not likely to happen; however, in April 2012, a LRT 1 trainset made the first trial journey to the MRT 3 depot.

On May 26, 2014, the line's general manager Al Vitangcol was replaced by LRTA Administrator Honorito Chaneco as officer-in-charge. The move came after Vitangcol was accused by the ambassador of the Czech Republic of extortion and for awarding the maintenance contract in October 2012 to PH Trams, a company established by Vitangcol's uncle-in-law. Vitangcol was also involved in an attempt to extort $30 million from Inekon Group in exchange of 48 train vehicles in July 2012.

Near the 2025 expiration of the build-lease-transfer agreement of the DOTr and MRTC, the department planned to transfer its management of the line to the LRTA. The plan was pitched in July 2023 by Transportation Undersecretary for Railways Cesar Chavez, when the department considered privatizing the operations and maintenance and bundling it with that of the LRT Line 2.

=== North Triangle Common Station ===
On November 21, 2013, the NEDA board, chaired by President Benigno Aquino III, approved the construction of a common station within North Avenue between SM City North EDSA and TriNoma shopping malls. It is estimated to cost ₱1.4 billion. It will feature head-to-head platforms for LRT 1 and MRT 3 trains with a 147.4-meter (484 ft) elevated walkalator to MRT 7. SM Investments Corporation posted 200 million pesos for the naming rights of the common station. This is inconsistent with the original plan of having seamless connectivity to Monumento and is also an unusual arrangement of having two train stations beside each other. However, the project was shelved indefinitely due to disputes over cost, engineering issues and naming rights. The Supreme Court halted the construction of the project in August 2014 after SM Prime Holdings contested the new location near Trinoma. An agreement was later reached under the administration of President Rodrigo Duterte on September 28, 2016, and the common station finally begun construction on September 29, 2017. The station will open in 2027.

== Incidents ==
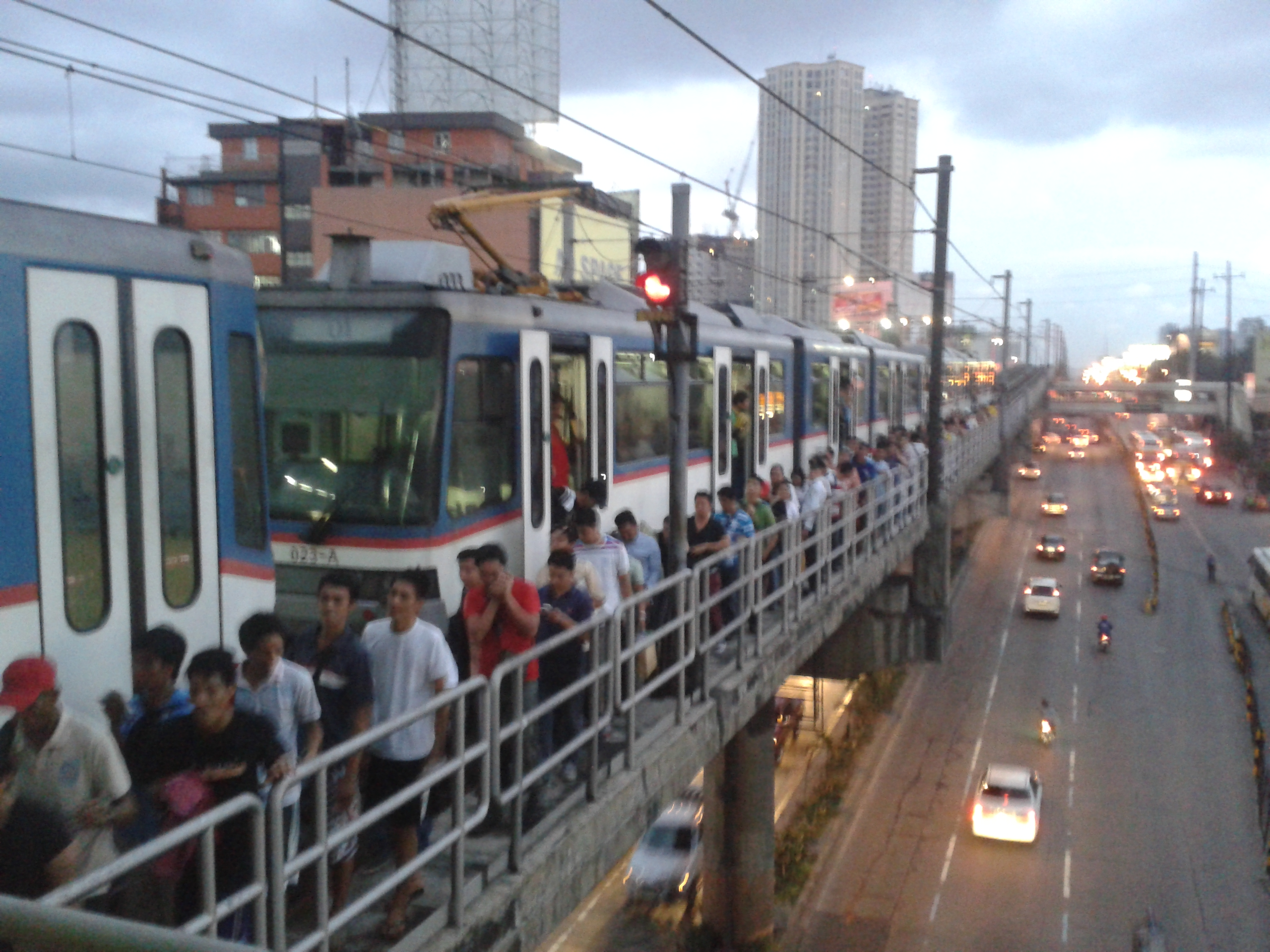
Passengers unloading from a 3000 class train in 2014 due to a service incident.

During the testing period of the system, the MRT–3 has been prone to numerous disruptions and breakdowns due to technical problems in the overall systems and design since its opening in 1999, due to many factors, such as the humid conditions in the country, lack of accessibility to the stations, and incompatible problems in the rolling stock, causing major adjustments to the system.

However, problems began to arise in 2012, due to poor maintenance causing train glitches, lack of spare parts, and negligence. The system has faced numerous interruptions and accidents. This in turn has caused lower ridership, frequent unloading of passengers and passenger inconvenience.

Among the notable incidents involving the railway line are:

- On January 10, 2000, full line operations were suspended after a fire broke out at the former bus depot of the Metro Manila Transit Corporation in the vicinity of the MRT-3 depot. The fire damaged one of its overhead electric lines and disabled one of two access tracks to the depot.
- On October 23, 2000, a flood at the EDSA-Taft intersection and an ongoing construction project that obstructed the sidewalk led to overcrowding at Taft Avenue station and left hundreds of passengers stranded.
- On March 19, 2003, a vagrant was killed by a northbound train after climbing onto the tracks near the Santolan-Annapolis station. The incident caused train operations to be suspended for half an hour.
- On August 29, 2003, a vagrant and a jeepney barker climbed up a MRT post near Cubao station. Both of them fell to their deaths after a brief altercation.
- On March 11, 2004, security guards of the MRT-3 staged a strike in protest of delayed salaries and other withheld benefits. To maintain station security during the disruption, the National Capital Region Police Office deployed officers to MRT-3 stations. In response to the strike, the DOTC ordered the termination of the security agency's contract.
- On May 20, 2004, heavy rains and strong winds caused a billboard to fall from a building in Cubao, which was carried towards the MRT tracks. Operations were temporarily suspended for an hour until the tracks were cleared of debris.
- On August 12, 2004, southbound operations were temporarily suspended after an overhead power cable snapped and triggered a small explosion at GMA-Kamuning station.
- On July 6, 2005, a MRT train hit and killed a security guard who was searching for thieves near the tracks at Guadalupe station, causing temporary disruption to train operations. It was determined that the guard was not wearing reflectors and was outside the designated safe zone for maintenance and security personnel.
- On September 23, 2005, strong winds caused a billboard to fall on the MRT power lines near Cubao station. The billboard was also dragged by a northbound train leaving Cubao and caused the last car to catch fire. As a result, train operations were limited to between the Taft Avenue and Shaw Boulevard stations. The incident has also caused the Metropolitan Manila Development Authority to call on local government units to strictly regulate billboards being put up along major roads.
- On October 22, 2006, a man was run over by a northbound MRT train between the Santolan and Ortigas stations. Reports say that the victim was believed to be a rugby boy and may have jumped from a nearby flyover. As a result, train operations were suspended for 10 minutes.
- In August 2010, a billboard dismantling operation at the Ortigas station of the Manila MRT-3 resulted in an accident when steel debris fell onto the overhead wires, disrupting train services. The debris also damaged multiple vehicles and caused significant traffic congestion on EDSA below.
- On August 18, 2012, a man sexually assaulted a female cashier passing through Santolan-Annapolis station, prompting an investigation from the Quezon City Police District.
- On November 3, 2012, a MRTC 3000 class train from the Araneta Center-Cubao station caught fire as it approached GMA–Kamuning station, causing passengers to scramble to the exits, and having two women injured. The train caught fire due to electrical short-circuit technical failure.
- On May 8, 2013, a man was killed in an apparent suicide after allegedly jumping in front of an oncoming MRTC 3000 class train at Guadalupe station.
- On March 26, 2014, a southbound MRTC 3000 class train at Guadalupe station suddenly stopped due to the train driver not observing the red light status at the Guadalupe station and accelerated southbound without getting prior clearance from the Control Center, causing the automatic train protection system to trigger and activate the emergency brakes, resulting in eight injuries.
- On August 13, 2014, a southbound MRTC 3000 class train heading to Taft Avenue station derailed and overshot to the streets. The train first stopped after leaving Magallanes station due to a technical problem. Later on, the train broke down altogether, so another train was used to push the stalled train. During this process, however, the first train became detached from the rails and overshot towards Taft Avenue. As a result, the train crashed through the buffer stop and concrete barriers and derailed onto Taft Avenue. At least 38 people were injured. The accident was blamed on two train drivers and two control personnel for failing to follow the proper coordination procedures and protocol.
- On September 2, 2014, a MRTC 3000 class train continued with one of its doors left open after a train door failed to close at the Guadalupe station. The passengers were then evacuated after the train arrived at Boni station.
- On October 22, 2017, train services were limited between North Avenue and Shaw Boulevard due to a used diaper being thrown onto the overhead catenary system between the Buendia and Ayala stations. The perpetrator was not identified and normal services were resumed after one hour.
- On November 14, 2017, an alighting passenger at the Ayala station suddenly fell down to the tracks. The passenger was caught between the first and second cars of the train, and her arm was cut off. Operations were disrupted but was resumed shortly. The injured passenger was then brought to a nearby hospital and her arm was reconnected by surgeons the following day. Following this incident, the government reconsidered the use of platform screen doors in stations to prevent such incident.
- On November 16, 2017, at 11:30 am, at least 140 passengers were evacuated from a train car that detached from a MRTC 3000 class train between the railway lines of Buendia and Ayala Avenue Stations.
- On August 7, 2018, an aircon leak caused the inside of a MRTC 3000 class train to flood, prompting passengers inside to open their umbrellas. The train was removed from service to fix the air conditioning unit and the train involved in the incident returned to service the following day.
- On September 26, 2018, two maintenance vehicles collided between Buendia and Guadalupe stations while doing a routine track maintenance, injuring 7 people. This resulted in a one-hour delay of the deployment of trains, causing long lines at stations.
- On September 6, 2019, an overhead catenary line section snapped at Guadalupe station, causing a power supply glitch in the whole line affecting over 7,000 passengers. Partial operations were implemented from North Avenue station to Shaw Boulevard station. The situation normalized at 5:00 pm. The incident was caused by a defective and old Protection and Control Unit (PTU) that was overdue for replacement, after an investigation was made. Train preparation and daily maintenance were among the factors that failed to prevent this incident.
- On November 4, 2019, at 4:08 pm, a MRTC 3000 class train suddenly emitted smoke while on the northbound track of the line. Around 530 passengers were unloaded. Around two hours after the incident, the operation of the line was back to normal. The fire was caused by a short-circuit in the traction motor.
- On May 9, 2021, two men were arrested for illegally going down to the railway tracks at Quezon Avenue station to take a selfie.
- On May 12, 2021, a MRTC 3000 class train car was vandalized near Taft Avenue station. An investigation found that an unidentified culprit had cut the perimeter fence near the station, which may have caused the vandalism.
- On October 9, 2021, a MRTC 3000 class train car caught fire near the Guadalupe station. A provisional service was implemented between North Avenue and Shaw Boulevard station, and the site of the incident was declared fire out at 9:51 pm. As a result of the incident, 8 passengers sustained minor injuries. Normal operations resumed the following day.
- On November 21, 2021, a window in a MRTC 3000 class LRV was damaged due to a stoning incident, with one injury reported. The suspect was later identified as a garbage collector and was subsequently arrested and charged.
- On June 12, 2022, two persons fell to their deaths from the EDSA-Taft Avenue (Tramo) flyover, onto the MRT-3 tracks leading to Taft Avenue station, causing an hour-long interruption in services.
- On March 3, 2025, an MRTC 3000 class train suddenly stopped between Santolan–Annapolis station and Araneta Center–Cubao station, with passengers stated that they smelled smoke and heard minor explosions inside the train. MRT management stated that the leading car of the train heading northbound experienced traction loss at around 12 pm, causing an hour-long interruption.
- On March 11, 2025, one of the escalators at Taft Avenue station had suddenly malfunctioned, with the escalator reversed its direction due to its escalator's main drive chain failure, resulting in 10 injuries. This incident had contributed to the relieving of the MRT-3 general manager Oscar Bongon.
