= Eton Centris =

Mixed-used development in Quezon City, Philippines

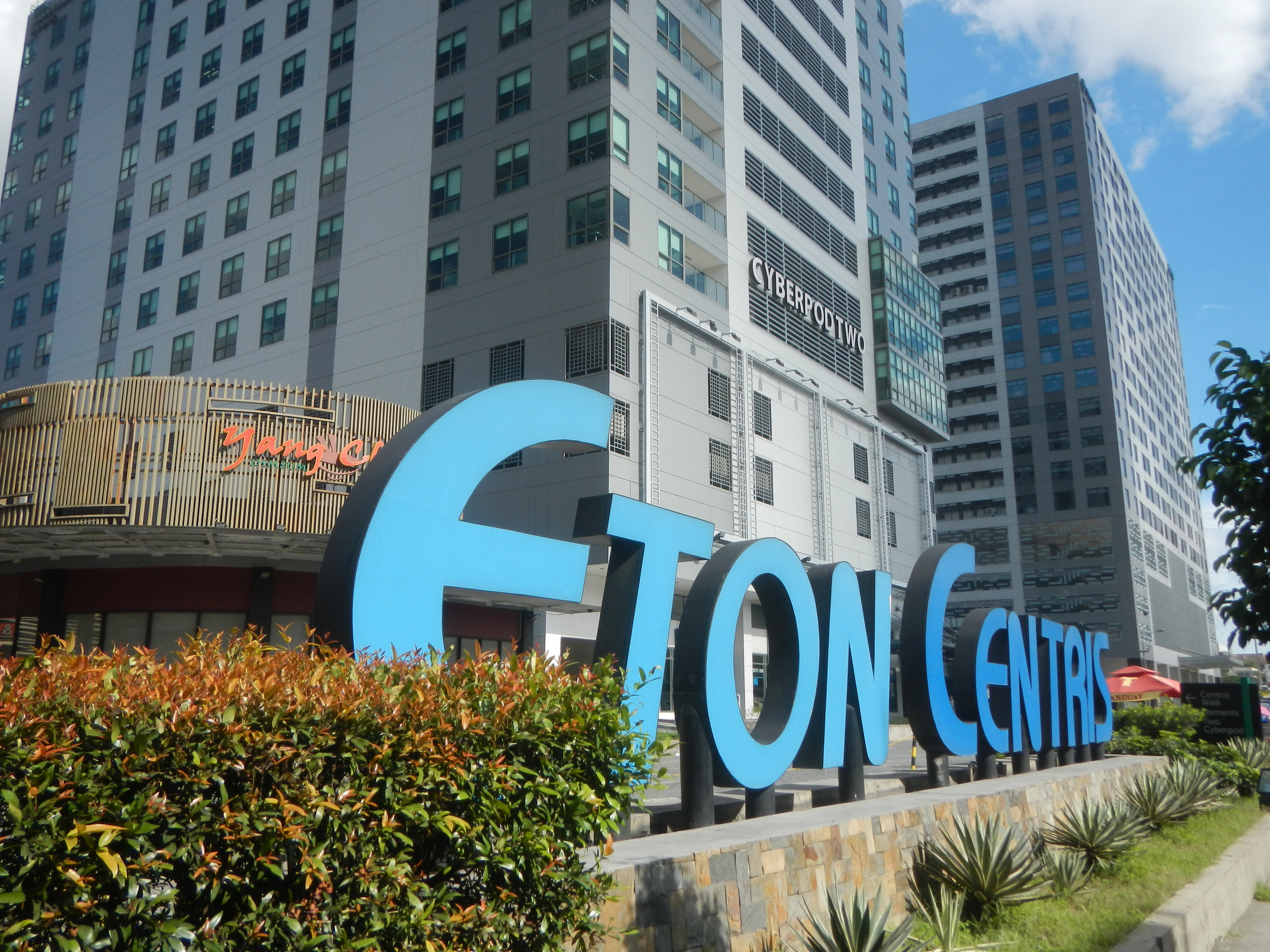

Project
- Opening date: 2000; 26 years ago
- Developer: Paramount Land Equities (until 2009); Eton Properties Philippines (from 2009)
- Website: eton.com.ph/portfolio-item/eton-centris/

Physical features
- Transport: Buses, jeepneys, UV Express, tricycles, and pedicabs Quezon Avenue; 1 Quezon Avenue; 6 EDSA; Future: MMS Quezon Avenue

Location
- Interactive map of Eton Centris
- Coordinates: 14°38′32″N 121°02′25″E
- Location: Pinyahan, Quezon City, Metro Manila, Philippines

Eton Centris is a development in Quezon City by Lucio Tan's Eton Properties Philippines. Eton Centris is located at the southeast corner of EDSA and Quezon Avenue. It is a major component of the Triangle Park business district. It covers an area of 12 hectares (30 acres).

== History ==
Eton Centris was announced in October 2008 as Eton's second major mixed-use development township project, after the 1,000 hectares (2,500 acres) Eton City in Santa Rosa, Laguna. In total, the development was planned to have seven office buildings and ten high-end residential condominiums. Eton developed Centris Station and Centris Walk simultaneously with two other projects: Eton Corinthian (also in Quezon City) and Green Podium (near De La Salle University); the expected total annual revenue from the three projects was ₱300 million, with a projected 60 to 70% occupancy rate at opening.

Eton Centris was originally being developed by Paramount Land Equities, another Lucio Tan-controlled company. In 2009, Eton Properties purchased the Centris development from Paramount in exchange for 1.6 billion newly issued Eton Properties shares. The shares were issued at ₱2.50 each, a premium of ₱0.17 over the volume-weighted average trading price of the shares in the past three months.

In early 2010, as Eton announced income growth of ten times for its first quarter of 2010 vs. 2009, president Danilo Ignacio stated that the company was in the planning stage to open the second BPO office. In September of the same year, Ignacio announced that Eton had begun collecting bids from contractors for the actual construction of the second BPO office.

== Major tenants ==
The 18,000 square metres (190,000 sq ft), 12-floor Eton Cyberpod Centris office building targets business process outsourcing companies. Each floor has 2,000 square metres (22,000 sq ft). The building is listed as an approved IT Center by the Philippine Economic Zone Authority, making export-oriented companies located therein eligible for temporary tax holiday, permanent reduced rate of corporate income tax, and other incentives.

SM Hypermarket was chosen as the anchor store for the complex's mall in October 2008. In September 2009, Indian BPO giant Wipro Technologies announced that it would rent 6,000 square metres (65,000 sq ft) of office space in Eton Cyberpod Centris, with a commitment to expand by another 33%. It was Wipro's second Philippine office after the Cebu Business Park.

== Gallery ==
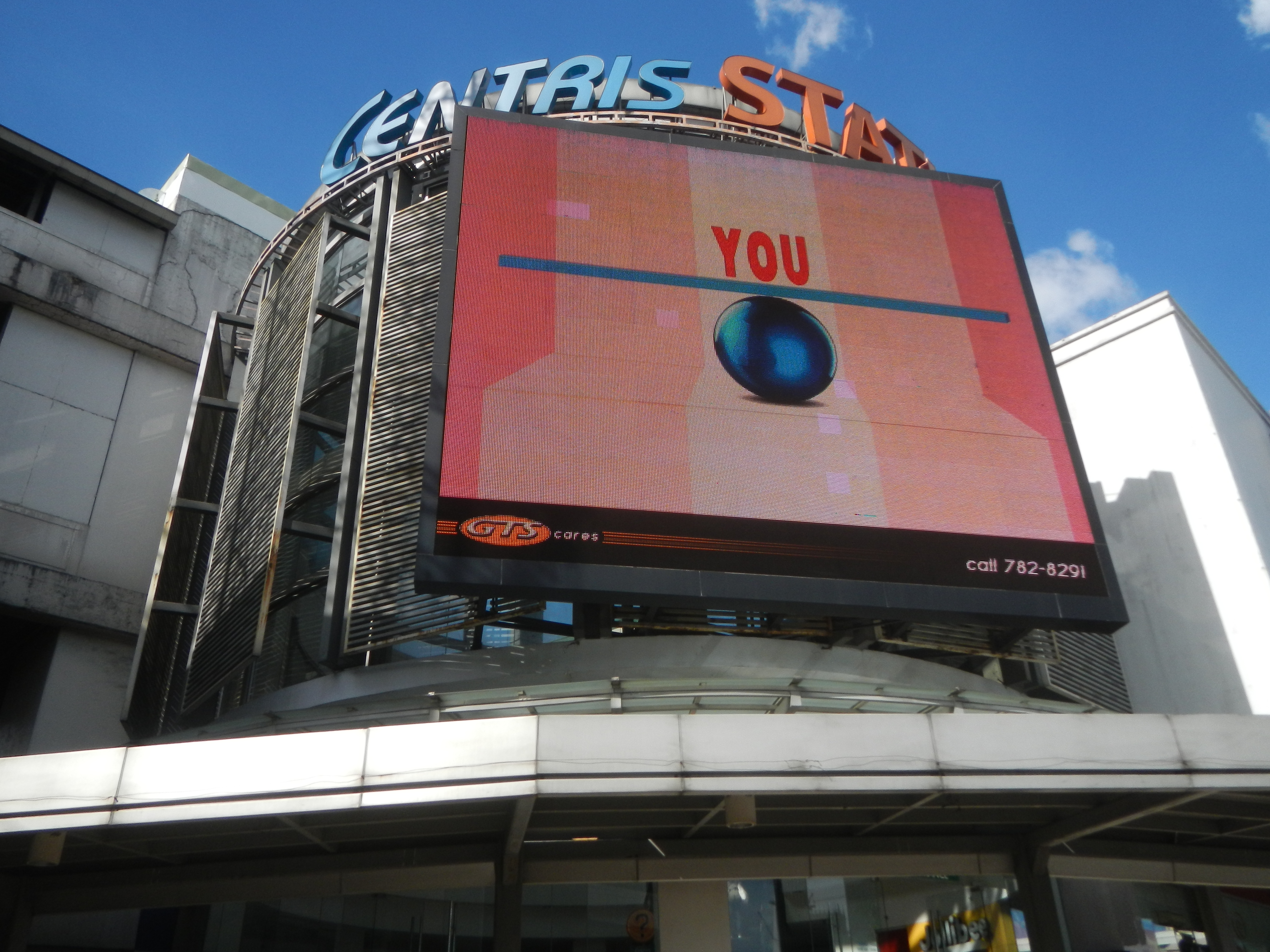
Facade of Centris Station.

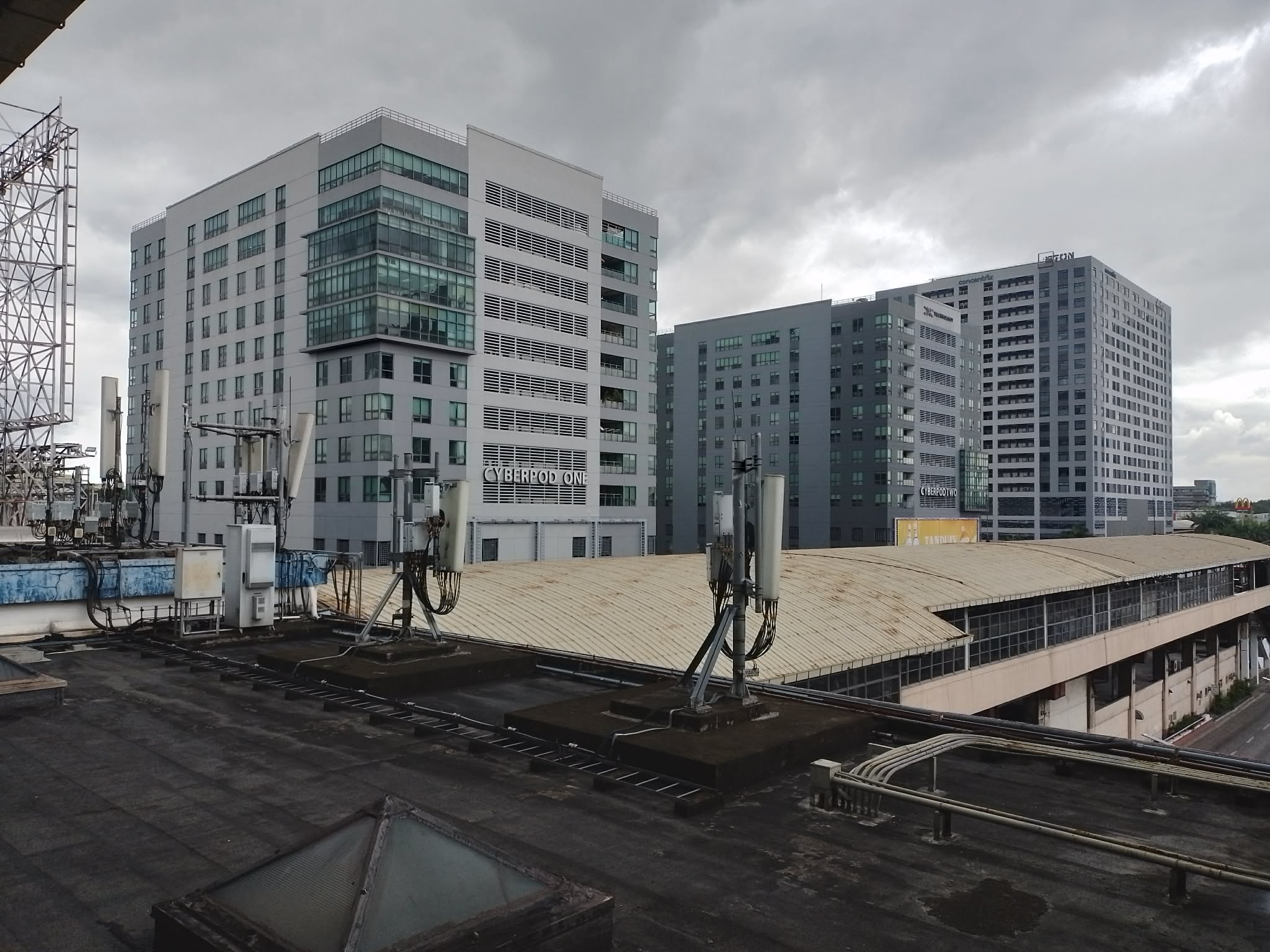
Station with Cyberpod Towers in background

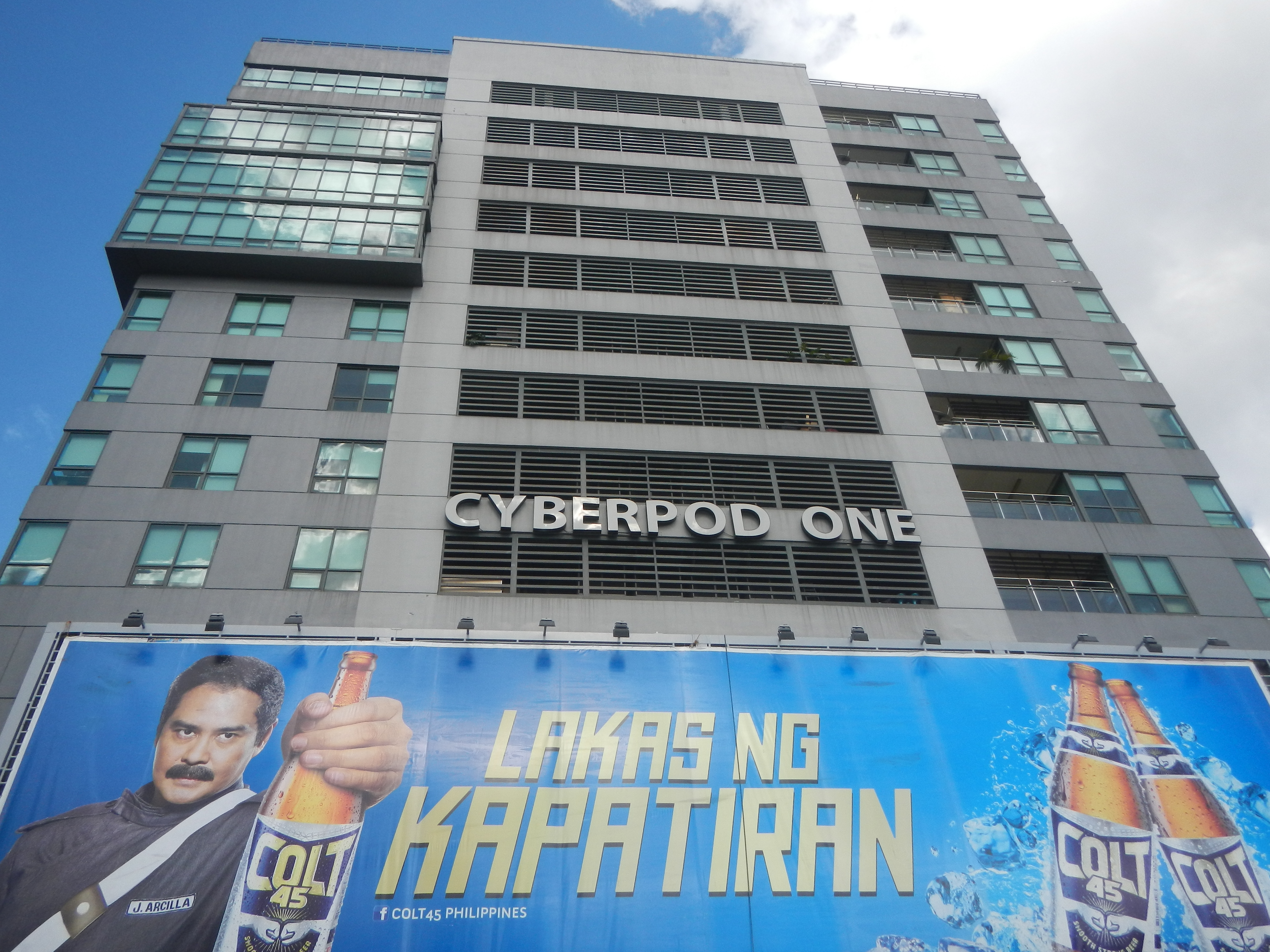
Cyberpod Tower 1.

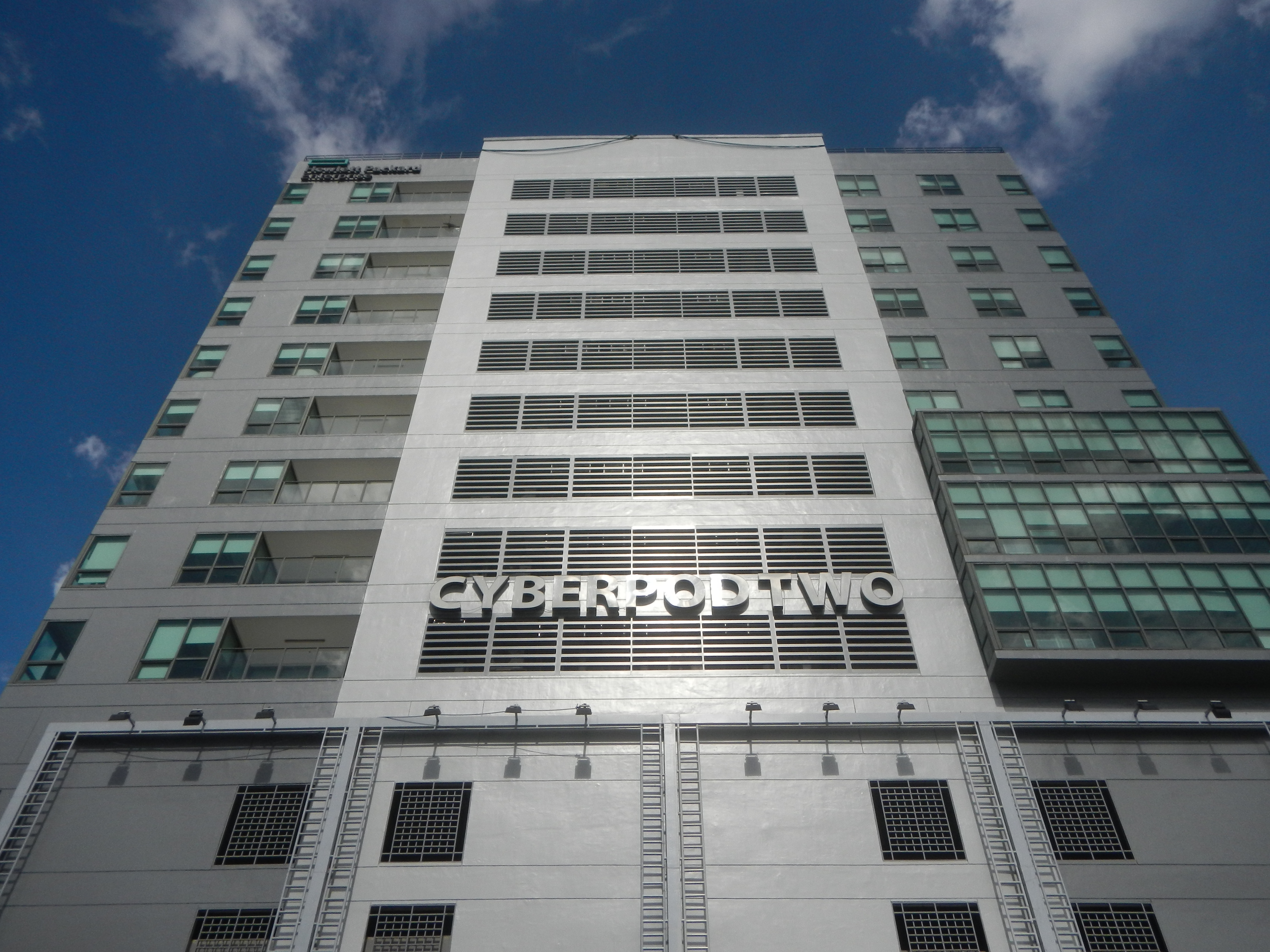
Cyberpod Tower 2.
