= Metro Rail Transit Corporation =

Philippine financial consortium

- Formerly: EDSA LRT Corporation, Ltd.
- Type: Private
- Founded: 1995; 31 years ago
- Founder: Robert John L. Sobrepeña
- Headquarters: Renaissance Tower, Meralco Avenue, Ortigas Center, Pasig City, Philippines
- Website: www.mrt3.com

The Metro Rail Transit Corporation (MRTC) is a private consortium organized in June 1995. The consortium is composed of seven Filipino-owned companies: Fil-Estate Management Inc (now Metro Global Holdings Corporation), Ayala Land Inc, Ramcar Inc, Greenfield Development Corporation (Unilab Group), Anglo-Philippine Holdings Corporation (National Book Store Group), Allante Realty and Development Inc, and DBH Inc. The Metro Rail Transit Corporation owns the Manila Metro Rail Transit System Line 3 running along the EDSA corridor. MRTC was the original contractor for the EDSA MRT-3 Project. It runs the MRT-3 in coordination with the Department of Transportation under a 25-year Build-Lease-Transfer contract or BLT Agreement, where it expired on July 15, 2025.

== History ==
=== Beginnings ===
The MRT Line 3 project, originally known as the EDSA LRT III project, was planned by the then-Department of Transportation and Communications (later the Department of Transportation) in 1989. A letter of intent was submitted by Eli Levin of Eli Levin Enterprises, Inc. to the DOTC in 1990, under a build-operate-transfer scheme. Eli Levin incorporated EDSA LRT Corporation Ltd. (ELCL), a Hong Kong–based consortium consisting of ten foreign companies.

The bidding for the EDSA LRT III project started in February 1991. Out of five companies that participated in the pre-bidding round, ELCL was the only company that met the requirements. On July 16, 1991, ELCL submitted a proposal for the EDSA LRT III project. The DOTC and ELCL signed a build-lease-transfer agreement on November 7. A revised and restated BLT agreement was signed on September 22, 1992. Under the agreement, the EDSA LRT III project will be covered in two phases: Phase 1 spans 16 kilometers (9.9 mi) from North Avenue in Quezon City until Taft Avenue in Pasay, while Phase 2 spans 5.5 kilometers (3.4 mi) from North Avenue to Monumento, eventually meeting up with the LRT Line 1. Phase 2, however, was shelved by the Arroyo administration in favor of the 5.7-kilometer (3.5 mi) LRT Line 1 north extension.

=== Formation of MRTC and construction of Line 3 ===
In June 1995, a newly formed consortium of reputable Philippine companies purchased an 85% stake in ELCL through EDSA LRT Holdings, Inc. (ELHI), a Philippine-registered company. ELHI also formed and owned MRT Development Corporation (MRTDevCo), which acquired the development and commercial rights to develop the 16-hectare depot site and the 13 stations. MRTC was formed for the purpose of designing, constructing, testing, commissioning, and maintaining the MRT Line 3.

In 1995, ELCL's name was changed to Metro Rail Transit Corporation Ltd. ("Metro Rail"), and ELHI was correspondingly renamed MRT Holdings, Inc in 1999.

Construction of the MRT Line 3 project began on October 15, 1996, with Sumitomo Corp as the main contractor and Mitsubishi Heavy Industries as the civil works sub-contractor. A revised build-lease-transfer agreement was signed on August 7, 1997. An amended turnkey agreement was later signed on September 16, 1997, with a consortium of companies (including Mitsubishi Heavy Industries and Sumitomo Corporation). A separate agreement was signed with ČKD Dopravní Systémy (ČKD Tatra, now part of Siemens AG), the leading builder of trams and light rail vehicles for the Eastern Bloc, on rolling stock. MRTC also retained the services of ICF Kaiser Engineers and Constructors (now Earthtech) to provide program management and technical oversight of the services for the design, construction management, and commissioning.

From September 1995 to March 2002, MRTC oversaw the construction, financing and operational management of the project. JP Morgan and the management team of MRTC negotiated with the support of a team of technical experts and other advisors in arranging project financing totaling US$675.5-million from the Japan Bank for International Cooperation (formerly Japan Export-Import Bank or JEXIM), Investiční a poštovní banka, a consortium of Foreign Currency Deposit Unit (FCDU) banks led by Citibank, Bank of the Philippine Islands, Far East Bank, ING Bank, Metrobank and the Philippine Government under a Sovereign credit basis whose blended all-in financing cost amounted to only 4.72% p.a. over the entire life of the loan facilities. On October 17, 1997, MRTC obtained financial closure of the loans for the project.

On December 10, 1997, a maintenance agreement was signed between MRTC, Sumitomo Corporation, and Mitsubishi Heavy Industries. Under the agreement, the maintenance provider will provide maintenance and repair services for a period of ten years for the MRT Line 3.

On December 15, 1999, the section of the MRT Line 3 from North Avenue to Buendia was inaugurated, with the line being fully operational on July 20, 2000. MRTC was obligated to lease the system to DOTC, who would operate the system, with MRTC providing the maintenance. DOTC was required to make payments of rental fees to MRTC, and these were broken down into several different portions. One significant part was intended to repay the loans taken out to finance the project, in which the loans were fully repaid in 2010.

=== Contemporary history ===
Plans to buy out the MRT-3 from MRTC to the government were initiated, but this was not pursued. On November 15, 2010, Metro Pacific Investments Corporation entered into a cooperation agreement with Fil-Estate Corporation to pursue the expansion programs for the MRT3. However, it did not materialize as DOTC's cooperation could not be secured then.

In Oct 2012, MRT-3 was carrying up to 600,000 passengers a day when DOTC cancelled the maintenance contract with Sumitomo/TESP and appointed local unqualified groups to handle the maintenance for Line 3, which resulted in poor condition of the rail line and as such the administrators received a barrage of complaints from passengers due to lack of maintenance. Technical problems became more and more frequent due to neglect and poor maintenance by the contractors appointed by the then-Department of Transportation and Communications. Fare hike was also pushed in 2015 almost doubling the fare cost for commuters with the intention of collecting additional revenues to fund the improvement of its services. However, technical problems persisted in spite of the change in maintenance providers, with the last one being Busan Universal Rail, Inc which was terminated by DOTr on November 6, 2017. The line's issues were resolved through a comprehensive rehabilitation project which returned Sumitomo Corporation as the maintenance provider of the line since 2019. The rehabilitation of the entire system including replacement of all rails has been completed.

== Project Funding Components ==
A breakdown of the key funders and tranche funding components of the MRT-3 Phase-1 Project were as follows:

== See also ==
- Metro Manila Rapid Transit
  - Line 1
  - Line 2
  - Line 3
  - Line 4
  - Line 5
  - Line 6
  - Line 7
  - Line 8
  - Line 9
  - PNR Metro Commuter Line
- List of rail transit stations in the Greater Manila Area
- Manila Light Rail Transit System
- Philippine National Railways
- Department of Transportation (DOTr)
- Transportation in the Philippines
