= Ortigas station =

Train station in Mandaluyong, Philippines

Ortigas	YL06
- Ortigas station in October 2026

General information
- Location: EDSA, Wack-Wack Greenhills; Mandaluyong, Metro Manila; Philippines
- Coordinates: 14°35′15″N 121°03′24″E
- Owner: Department of Transportation
- Operator: Department of Transportation
- Line: MRT Line 3
- Platforms: 2 (2 side)
- Tracks: 2
- Connections: 1 Ortigas; Future: 4 EDSA

Construction
- Structure type: Elevated
- Parking: Yes (ADB, SM Megamall)
- Cycle facilities: Bicycle racks (southbound side only)
- Accessible: Concourse: Southbound entrance only Platforms: All platforms

History
- Opened: December 15, 1999; 26 years ago

Services
Preceding station	Manila MRT	Following station
Santolan–Annapolis towards North Avenue	MRT Line 3	Shaw Boulevard towards Taft Avenue

Future out-of-system interchange
Preceding station	Manila MRT	Following station
Terminus	MRT Line 4 transfer at EDSA	Meralco towards Taytay
Track layout
Location

Ortigas station is an elevated Metro Rail Transit (MRT) station located on the MRT Line 3 (MRT-3) system in the Mandaluyong portion of Ortigas Center (under barangay Wack-Wack Greenhills). The station is named after the center, as well as the nearby Ortigas Avenue.

Ortigas station is the sixth station for trains headed to Taft Avenue and the eighth station for trains headed to North Avenue. It is one of three stations to be situated in Mandaluyong and the northernmost one, near the boundary with Quezon City. The station is notorious for having a narrow sidewalk on its east exit, which forces pedestrians to squeeze through the sidewalk and its fencing along EDSA due to legal right-of-way issues with the Asian Development Bank and its headquarters next to the station itself.

== History ==
Ortigas station was opened on December 15, 1999, as part of MRT's initial section from North Avenue to Buendia.

== Nearby landmarks ==
The station serves the Ortigas business district and is interconnected with the Asian Development Bank headquarters. It is near major shopping malls, such as Robinsons Galleria, SM Megamall, The Podium and St. Francis Square Mall; as well as the headquarters of the Meralco, UnionBank, Robinsons Bank and JG Summit Holdings. A few government buildings are also located in the station's vicinity including the central offices of the Securities and Exchange Commission and the Department of Migrant Workers, the Ortigas office of the Department of Transportation, and the Philippine Railways Institute, as well as educational institutions like Saint Pedro Poveda College and La Salle Green Hills. The EDSA Shrine, Meralco Theater, Lopez Museum, The Medical City, Eton Cyberpod, Holiday Inn, Crowne Plaza and Oakwood Premier hotels are also nearby.

West of the station is Gate 4 of Wack Wack Village on Berkeley Street, providing access to the Wack Wack Golf and Country Club.

== Transportation links ==
Buses, jeepneys and taxis serve the station, but passengers may board them from either Robinson's Galleria (buses, jeepneys, taxis, UV Express) or SM Megamall (buses, taxis, UV Express). A bus stop of EDSA Carousel is located just next to the station, accessible through the southbound platform. Buses ply both EDSA and Ortigas Avenue routes, while jeepneys ply along Ortigas Avenue for routes heading to Pasig and the province of Rizal to the east, and San Juan and the City of Manila to the west. Passengers bound for Clark International Airport may ride either a Philtranco bus at the back of SM Megamall Building A or a Genesis Transport point-to-point (P2P) bus at Robinsons Galleria.

The station would also be linked to the EDSA station of the future MRT Line 4.

== Sidewalk issues ==
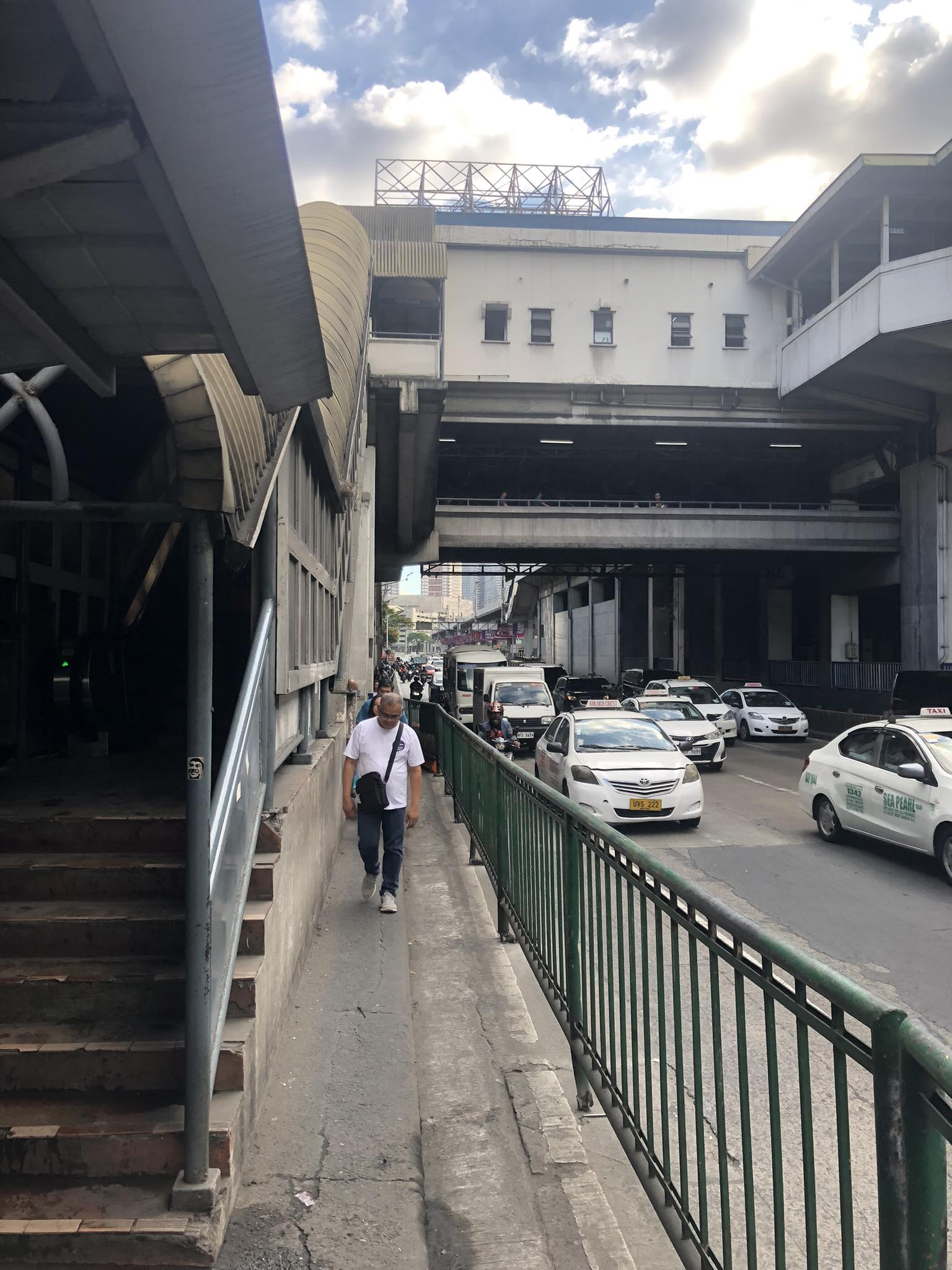
The sidewalk shown with the station's east entrance in February 2024.

Ortigas station is notorious among commuters for having a very narrow sidewalk along EDSA at its east entrance and exit along the northbound direction of EDSA. This is caused by the already-narrow sidewalk along the ADB property which was then occupied by the columns of the station and the escalator to the MRT station. As such, pedestrians and commuters are left no choice but to squeeze through the narrow remainder of the sidewalk in between the escalator, columns, and sidewalk fencing.

During the opening of the line in 1999, the Metro Rail Transit Corporation (MRTC) stated that this was due to the Asian Development Bank, whose headquarters is located next to the station, refusing to grant the needed right-of-way to install elevators to the station due to the ADB property being "quasi-sovereign" land under its agreement with the Philippine government. The agreement, signed in 1966, provides that the land designated as the ADB headquarters seat is protected from expropriation and may not be transferred, disposed of, or modified by the government without the ADB's consent, complicating any efforts to alter the surrounding right-of-way or widen pedestrian infrastructure in the area.

On January 19, 2024, the escalator was shut down for maintenance until January 22, causing a swelling of pedestrians and commuters on the narrow sidewalk. Due to this, the sidewalk fencing around the escalator was temporarily moved to partially occupy the EDSA northbound bicycle lane.

On September 21, 2025, during the Trillion Peso March protests, Ortigas station and its sidewalks became overcrowded with heavy volumes of crowds going to the protests at EDSA Shrine and the People Power Monument. According to a report from The LaSallian, the station's turnstiles were also deactivated to ease the flow of passengers.

== See also ==
- List of rail transit stations in Metro Manila
- Manila Metro Rail Transit System Line 3
