= Greenfield District =

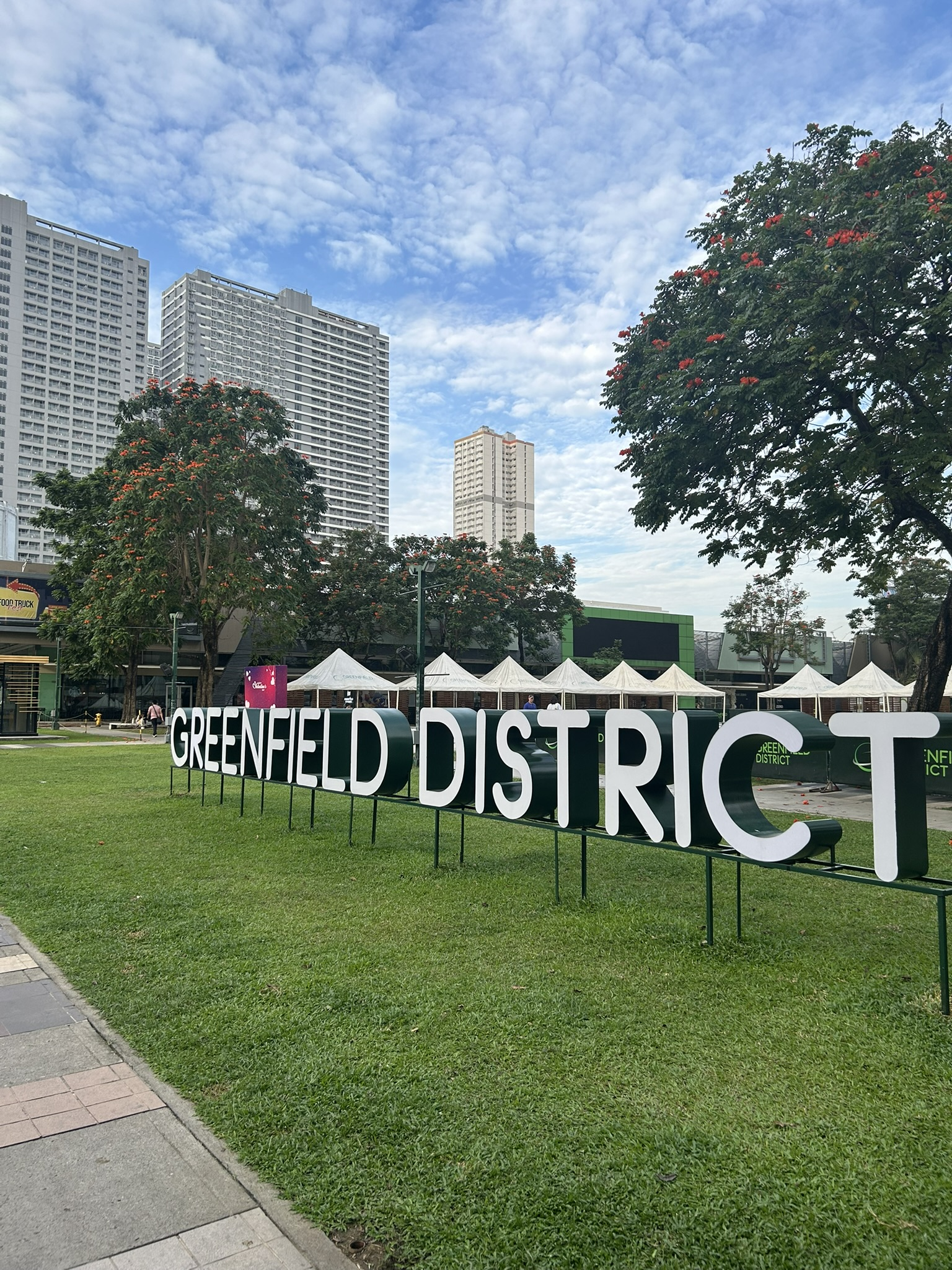

Project
- Opening date: 2009
- Developer: Greenfield Development Corporation
- Owner: Greenfield Development Corporation
- Website: Greenfield District

Physical features
- Transport: Shaw Boulevard; Boni; Jeepneys, UV Express, P2P buses

Location
- Interactive map of Greenfield District
- Coordinates: 14°34′39″N 121°3′16″E
- Location: Highway Hills, Mandaluyong, Metro Manila, Philippines
- Address: EDSA and Shaw Boulevard

Greenfield District is a transit-oriented mixed-use development in Mandaluyong, Metro Manila, Philippines. It is a redevelopment of the old United Laboratories (Unilab) pharmaceutical plant and adjacent retail market in Barangay Highway Hills adjoining Barangay Kapitolyo in Pasig to the east. The 15-hectare (37-acre) mixed commercial and residential complex is in the crossroads of EDSA and Shaw Boulevard immediately south of the Ortigas Center. It consists of an office tower, condominium high-rises, a central park, retail centers and recreational facilities.

== Location ==
Greenfield District is situated along Metro Manila's main thoroughfare, EDSA, near the geographic center of the metropolis. It is a natural extension of Ortigas Center abutting the Shang Central development, as well as Lourdes School of Mandaluyong, to the north. The district is spread over an area bounded on the north by Shaw Boulevard, on the east by Pioneer Street, on the south by Reliance Street, and EDSA on the west. It is in a rapidly urbanizing area of eastern Mandaluyong that saw gentrification in the late 2000s with the construction of Robinsons Cybergate and Forum Robinsons, TV5 Media Center, and several condominium complexes. Greenfield District is directly connected to the Manila MRT-3 Shaw Boulevard station through its Greenfield Pavilion (formerly EDSA Central Pavilion). It is also indirectly linked to Shangri-La Plaza and Starmall Edsa Shaw through the walkways of the MRT-3 station.

== History ==
The United Laboratories compound in Mandaluyong

Greenfield District is on a 30-hectare (74-acre) plot of land acquired by Unilab founder Jose Yao Campos from Ortigas & Company in the 1950s. For a long time, the area belonged to the 4,033-hectare (9,970-acre) Hacienda de Mandaloyon (also known as Mandaloya, Mandaloyen, or Mandaloyong), a former friar estate owned by the Order of Saint Augustine which Francisco Ortigas purchased in the 1920s. The Campos group moved its Unilab production plant from its Santa Mesa compound to the Mandaluyong property in 1961. In the same year, the group formed Greenfield Development Corp. to manage the rest of the property.

Greenfield Development's first foray into the property development industry was with its wet and dry goods market launched in the 1970s. The Edsa Central, popularly known as Edsa Crossing, covered 8 hectares (20 acres) of a corner of the property facing Edsa and Shaw Boulevard and included a jeepney terminal. After two decades, Greenfield Development announced its complete redevelopment into a modern shopping center to be divided into four separate buildings or sections, namely the Edsa Central Station Mall, Edsa Central Bazaar, Edsa Central Wet Market and Jeepney Park. Along with the makeover of its flagship mall in December 2003, Greenfield Development announced that a masterplan for the property as the new Greenfield District mixed-use development was being drawn up. It launched its first condominium project in the district in January 2004, the Soho Central, in partnership with Jose Antonio's Meridien Development Group.

In March 2007, Unilab announced that it would be transferring all its production facilities in Mandaluyong to its 35,000-square-meter (380,000 sq ft) Pharma Campus in Biñan, Laguna. In November 2009, Greenfield Development broke ground on the second residential development in the district, its first exclusive project, with the twin-tower Twin Oaks Place.

== Developments ==
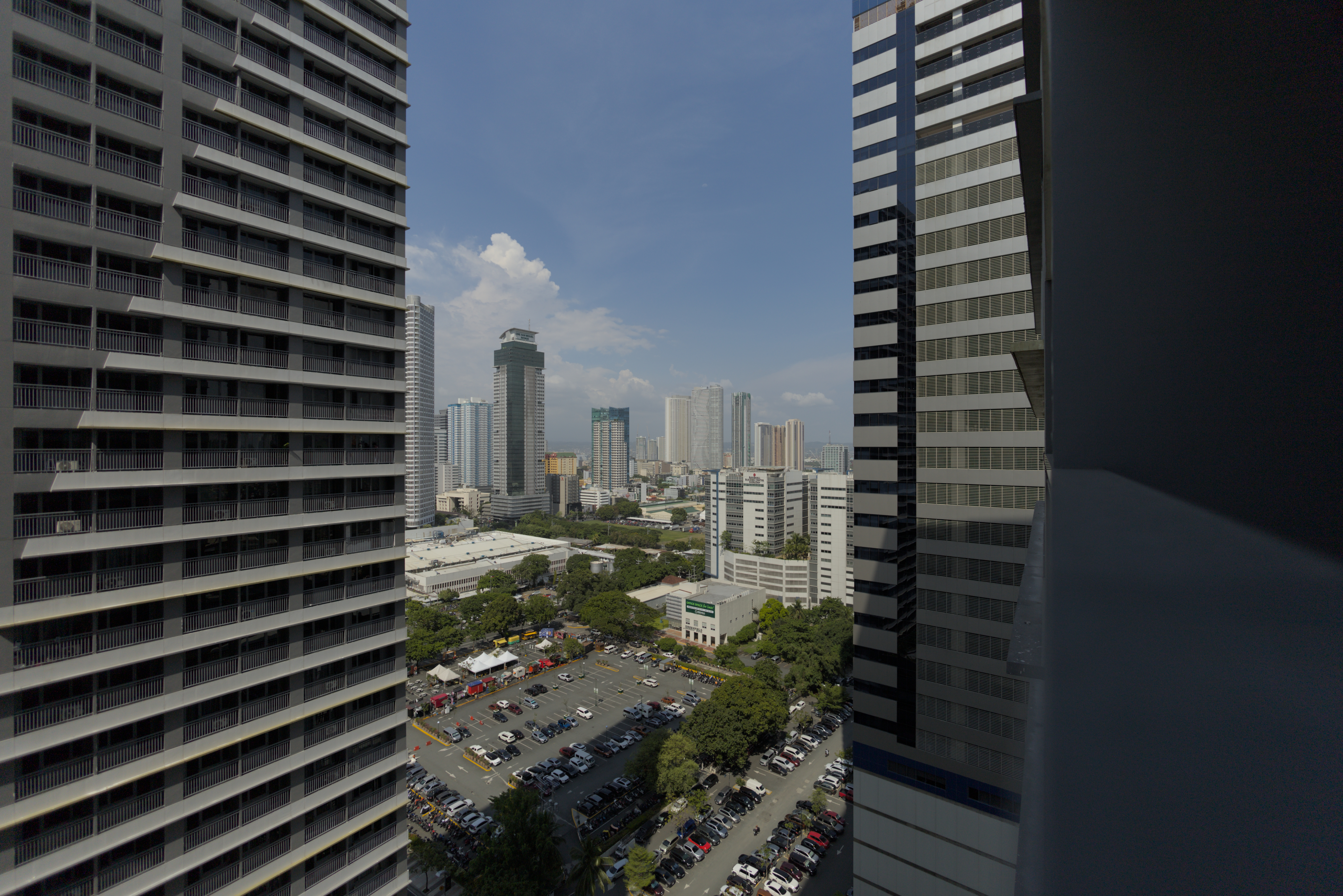
View of Greenfield District from SMDC Fame Residences

The Portal

Greenfield District boasts a variety of amenities, including strip malls like The Hub, The Portal, The Square, and Pavilion, along with office buildings such as IT Center 2, Greenfield Tower, and HealthFirst Williams Center. It is also home to residential developments like Twin Oaks Place and Zitan, forming part of the Edsa Central development. It also hosts the Greenfield Weekend Market which offers outdoor dining and live jazz music every weekend evening. The market is housed in the Greenfield Central Park that occupies the open space between the four retail buildings. The District's green open spaces comprise 40% of the entire development. The Portal houses an indoor rock climbing gym known as Climb Central Manila and formerly a trampoline park.

Other notable establishments in the District include the offices of Greenfield Development Corporation, a Bank of the Philippine Islands branch, and the open-air Mayflower Parking that houses the Food Truck Fest, fire and police sub-stations, a Maxus showroom, Unilab's main and R&D offices, and warehouses respectively belonging to La Perla and Univet Nutrition and Animal Healthcare Company (UNAHCO).

=== Office buildings ===
==== IT Center 2 ====
IT Center 2, also known as the EDSA Central IT Center, is a two-story Philippine Economic Zone Authority-accredited office building on EDSA and United Street. Built in 2009, it hosts Teleperformance.

==== Greenfield Tower ====
Greenfield Tower is a 30-storey office building on Mayflower Street and Williams Street with a total leasable office space of 65,765 square meters (707,890 sq ft). It features a six-level retail podium, a restaurant, garden and auditorium on its roof deck. It was completed in October 2017.

=== Residential developments ===
==== Soho Central ====
Soho Central

The Soho Central Private Residences is a 41-storey condominium development along Shaw Boulevard. It was created by a joint venture between Greenfield Development Corporation, Century Properties and the Meridien Group.

==== Twin Oaks Place ====
Twin Oaks Place

Twin Oaks Place is a twin tower residential condominium development along Shaw Boulevard consisting of the West Tower, completed in 2014, and the East Tower, which was completed in 2018.

==== Zitan ====
Zitan is a 35-storey condominium development by Equus Property Venture, Inc., a wholly owned subsidiary of Greenfield Development. It is located next to the Pavilion development and the Shaw Boulevard station of the MRT-3.
