= Santolan–Annapolis station =

Train station in Quezon City, Philippines

Coordinates: 14°36′27.76″N 121°03′23.19″E

Santolan–Annapolis	YL05
- Santolan–Annapolis station in October 2026

General information
- Other names: Santolan
- Location: EDSA, Bagong Lipunan ng Crame & Camp Aguinaldo; Quezon City, Metro Manila; Philippines
- Owner: Department of Transportation
- Operator: Department of Transportation
- Line: MRT Line 3
- Platforms: 2 (2 side)
- Tracks: 2
- Connections: E Santolan

Construction
- Structure type: Elevated
- Cycle facilities: Bicycle racks (both sides)
- Accessible: Concourse: All entrances Platforms: All platforms

History
- Opened: December 15, 1999; 26 years ago

Services
Preceding station	Manila MRT	Following station
Araneta Center–Cubao towards North Avenue	MRT Line 3	Ortigas towards Taft Avenue
Track layout
Location

Santolan–Annapolis station, also simply known as Santolan station, is an elevated Metro Rail Transit (MRT) station located on the MRT Line 3 (MRT-3) system in Quezon City. It is the ninth station for trains headed to North Avenue and the fifth station for trains headed to Taft Avenue. The station is named after the streets it is situated in between Santolan Road (officially known as Bonny Serrano Avenue) and Annapolis Street, and near the eastern San Juan–Quezon City boundary.

== History ==
Santolan–Annapolis station was planned as part of the Phase 1 of the EDSA LRT III project, following a Build-Lease-Transfer (BLT) agreement between the Department of Transportation and Communications (DOTC) and EDSA LRT Corporation on September 22, 1992. However, the project faced delays due to government investigations into the contract, and construction was postponed until the Supreme Court of the Philippines upheld the contract's legality in 1995. Construction of the line finally began at this area on October 15, 1996 as the MRT III project, under a BLT contract awarded to the Metro Rail Transit Corporation (MRTC), led by a consortium of local companies.

The station was opened on December 15, 1999, as part of MRT's initial section from North Avenue to Buendia.

== Nearby landmarks ==
Its nearest landmarks include Camp Aguinaldo, the Armed Forces of the Philippines and Department of National Defense main headquarters; Camp Crame, the Philippine National Police's main headquarters; V.V. Soliven Building; and Atlanta Centre. It is also the closest station to the Greenhills shopping district and the adjacent Greenhills North and Northeast villages in San Juan, as well as the eastern section of Barangay Wack-Wack Greenhills in Mandaluyong.

== Transportation links ==
Jeepneys, taxis, and buses serve the station. A terminal of jeepneys bound for the Greenhills shopping district is located at the intersection of EDSA and Annapolis Street. Many tricycles also ply near Camp Crame and Camp Aguinaldo, serving the nearby smaller streets. A portion of the northbound platform of the station leading to the emergency stairs is utilized as an access point to the Santolan bus stop of EDSA Carousel, located north of the station and at the center island of EDSA.

== See also ==
- List of rail transit stations in Metro Manila
- Manila Metro Rail Transit System Line 3
- Media related to Santolan station (Line 3) at Wikimedia Commons
