= Shaw Boulevard station =

Train station in Mandaluyong, Philippines

Coordinates: 14°34′53.03″N 121°03′13.25″E

Shaw Boulevard	YL07
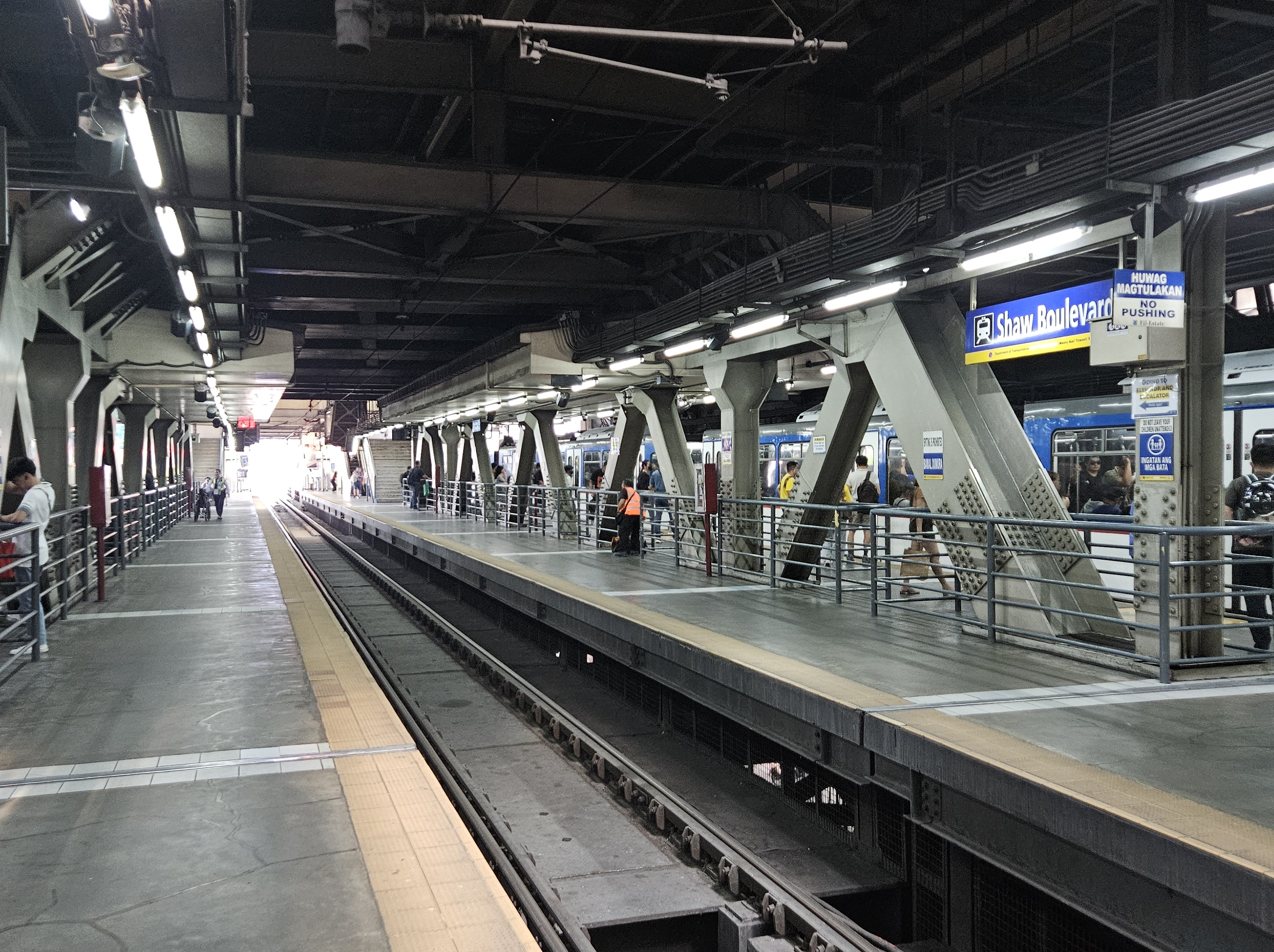
- Shaw Boulevard station in May 2026

General information
- Location: EDSA (C-4), Highway Hills & Wack-Wack Greenhills; Mandaluyong, Metro Manila; Philippines
- Owner: Department of Transportation
- Operator: Department of Transportation
- Line: MRT Line 3
- Platforms: 4 (2 island)
- Tracks: 3
- Connections: Future: E Greenfield

Construction
- Structure type: Elevated
- Parking: Yes (Shangri-La Plaza, Edsa Shangri-La, Starmall EDSA-Shaw, SM Megamall, Greenfield District, Cityland Grand Central Residences)
- Cycle facilities: Bicycle racks (Shangri-La concourse and EDSA Central concourse)
- Accessible: Concourse: Shangri-La concourse (direct) and EDSA Central concourse (via Greenfield District Pavilion); Platforms: All platforms to/from Shangri-La concourse only

History
- Opened: December 15, 1999; 26 years ago

Services
Preceding station	Manila MRT	Following station
Ortigas towards North Avenue	MRT Line 3	Boni towards Taft Avenue
Track layout
Location

Shaw Boulevard station is an elevated Metro Rail Transit (MRT) station located on the MRT Line 3 (MRT-3) system in the Mandaluyong portion of Ortigas Center. The station is named after Shaw Boulevard, since the station lies directly above the boulevard. Being at the center of the whole line, many commuters regard Shaw Boulevard station as the "central terminal" of the line.

The station is the seventh station for trains headed to Taft Avenue and North Avenue. It is one of six stations on the line where passengers can catch a train going in the opposite direction without paying a new fare due to the station's layout; the other five are Araneta Center-Cubao, Boni, Buendia, Ayala, and Taft Avenue. Excluding Araneta Center-Cubao station, it is also one of five stations on the line with its concourse level located above the platform.

== History ==
Shaw Boulevard station was opened on December 15, 1999, as part of MRT's initial section from North Avenue to Buendia. The station's Building A (Shangri-La Concourse) entry and exit points underwent improvement works from March 21 to 22, 2022.

== Station layout ==
Shaw Boulevard station is the only station on the line with 3 tracks; with 1 reserve track used for temporary parking of disabled trains and as a termination track when regular train service is disrupted, and 2 for regular train service. It is the only elevated station in the line to feature a concourse on top of the platforms at the third level, the only station in the line with a gable pitched roof, and the only station in the line to have two concourses, which are split into unconnected sections by the EDSA-Shaw Flyover. Each concourse building also hosts retail spaces.

=== Shangri-La concourse ===
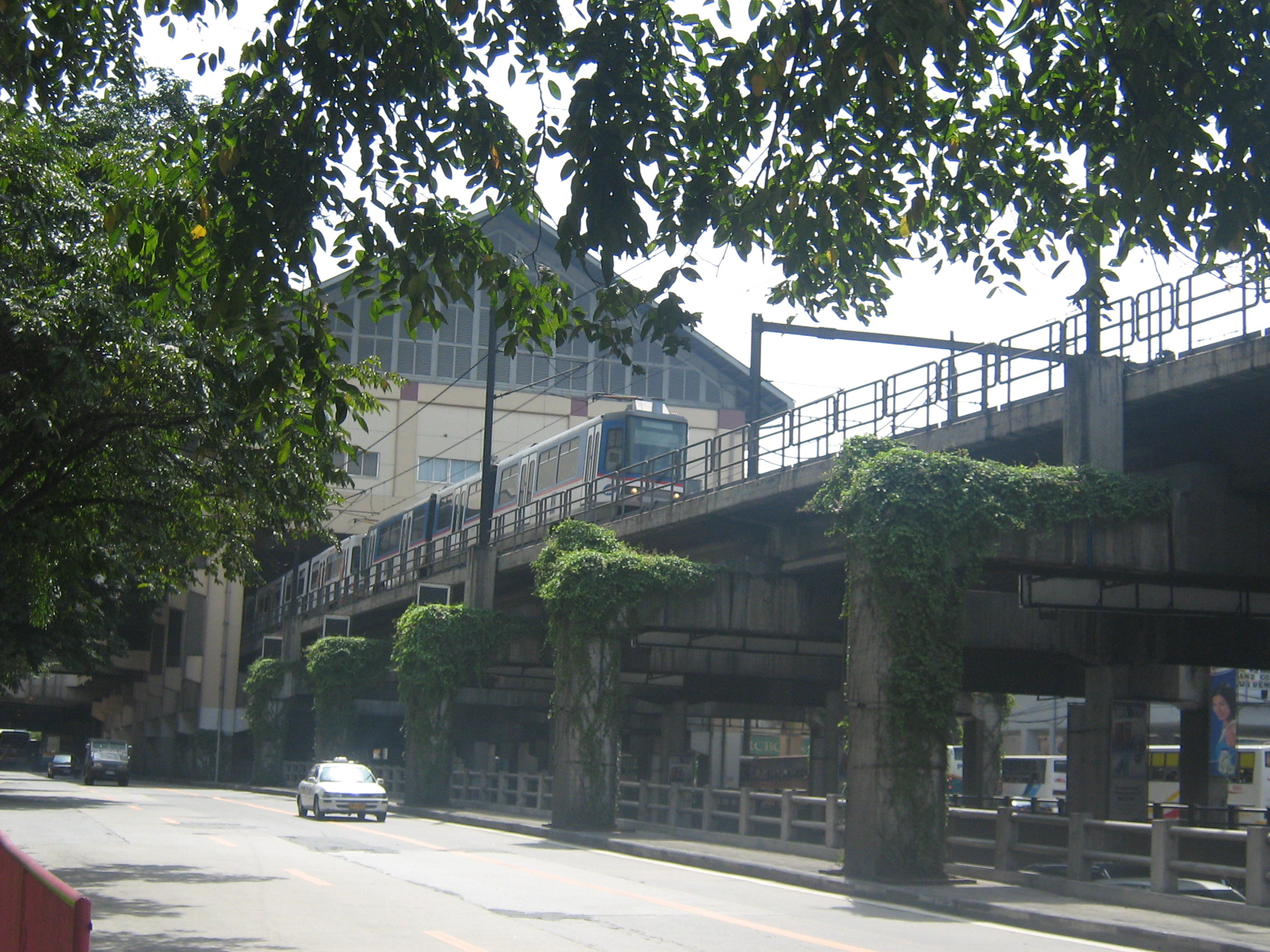
View of the station's Shangri-La concourse building from EDSA

The northern Shangri-La concourse (also referred to as Building A) provides direct access to Shangri-La Plaza and Starmall EDSA-Shaw, which in turn provides access to its transport terminal, as well as indirect access to the Edsa Shangri-La Hotel, SM Megamall, and Wack Wack Village. Exiting through this concourse is provided through the escalators, elevators, and straight staircases on the northern end of the main platforms. It is the only concourse with elevator access to and from the ground level and to and from the platform level.

The adjacent stairs and escalators that provides street level access to the concourse is often dubbed by commuters as "Mount Shaw" or "Mount Shaw Boulevard" due to the length of the staircase to the station's concourse, which is at the same level with the fourth and fifth floors of the Shangri-La Plaza.

=== EDSA Central concourse ===
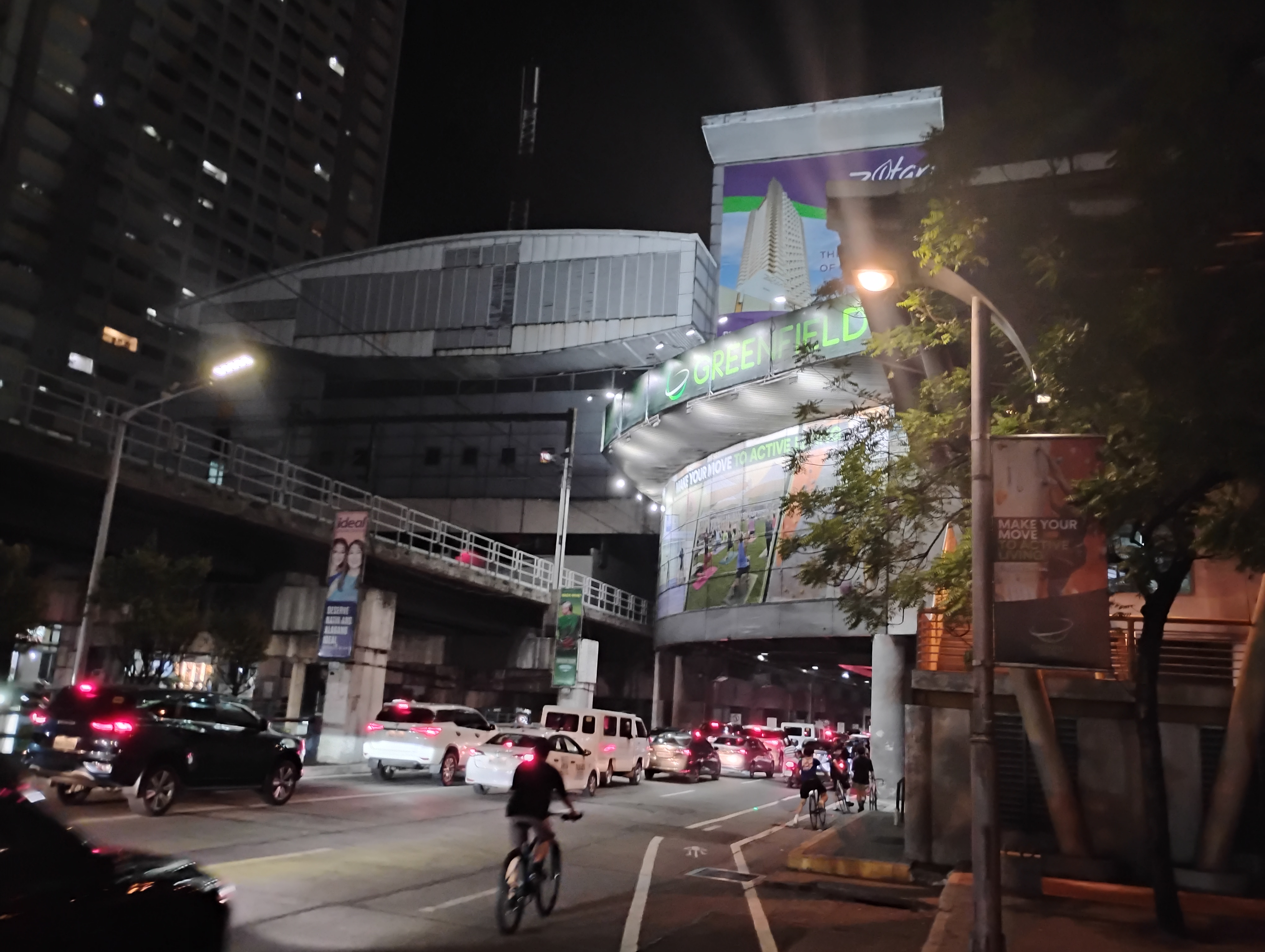
View of the station's EDSA Central concourse building from EDSA.

The southern EDSA Central concourse (also referred to as Building B) provides direct access to Greenfield District Pavilion (formerly EDSA Central) mall, which in turn provides indirect access to the rest of Greenfield District and nearby jeepney terminals. Unlike the Shangri-La concourse, which is a standalone structure, the southern concourse is encapsulated within the Greenfield District Pavilion. This portion of the station is integrated directly into the building's structure, thus being managed by Greenfield Development Corporation, the developer of the Greenfield District. Exiting through this concourse is provided through escalators and a bifurcated staircase from the southern end of the main platforms. It also provides indirect access to Parklea Centre, Cityland Grand Central Residences, and ANF Commercial Center, which is located across Sultan Street.

=== Station platforms ===
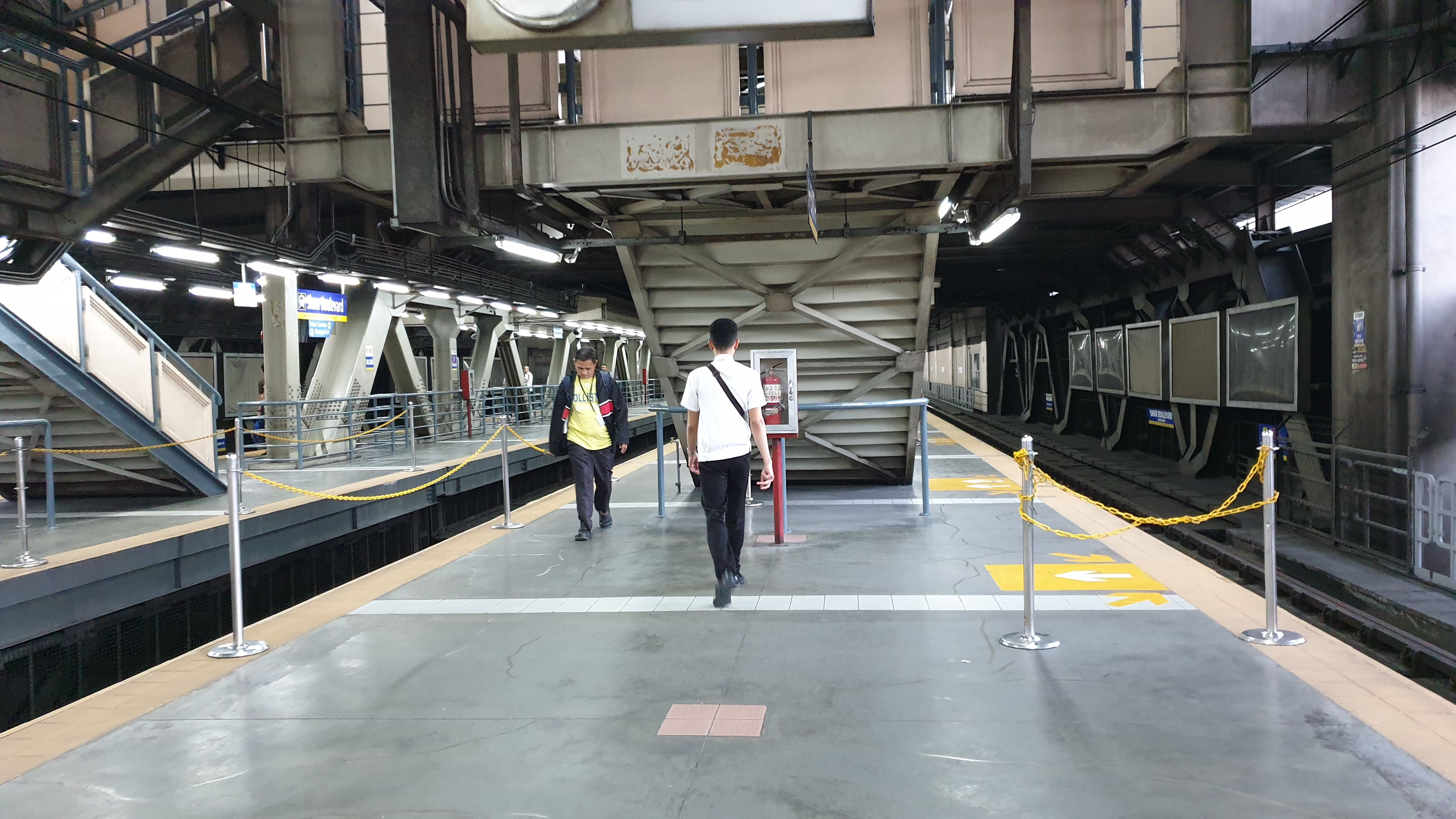
Station Platform 2 in 2019

The station's main platforms consist of two island platforms with the outer sides serving the northbound and southbound tracks respectively, and the inner side serving the single reserve track. The platform space for the reserve track also doubles as additional platform space for commuters embarking and disembarking the trains during peak hours.

=== Elevated walkway ===
A narrow, elevated walkway on the second level of the station (outside of the fare gates) can be accessed at the midway of the Shaw Boulevard intersection escalators on the northern concourse. This provides access to the southern concourse and the establishments directly connected to it. Despite being at level with the platform, this walkway is not accessible without passing through the fare gates.

== Nearby landmarks ==
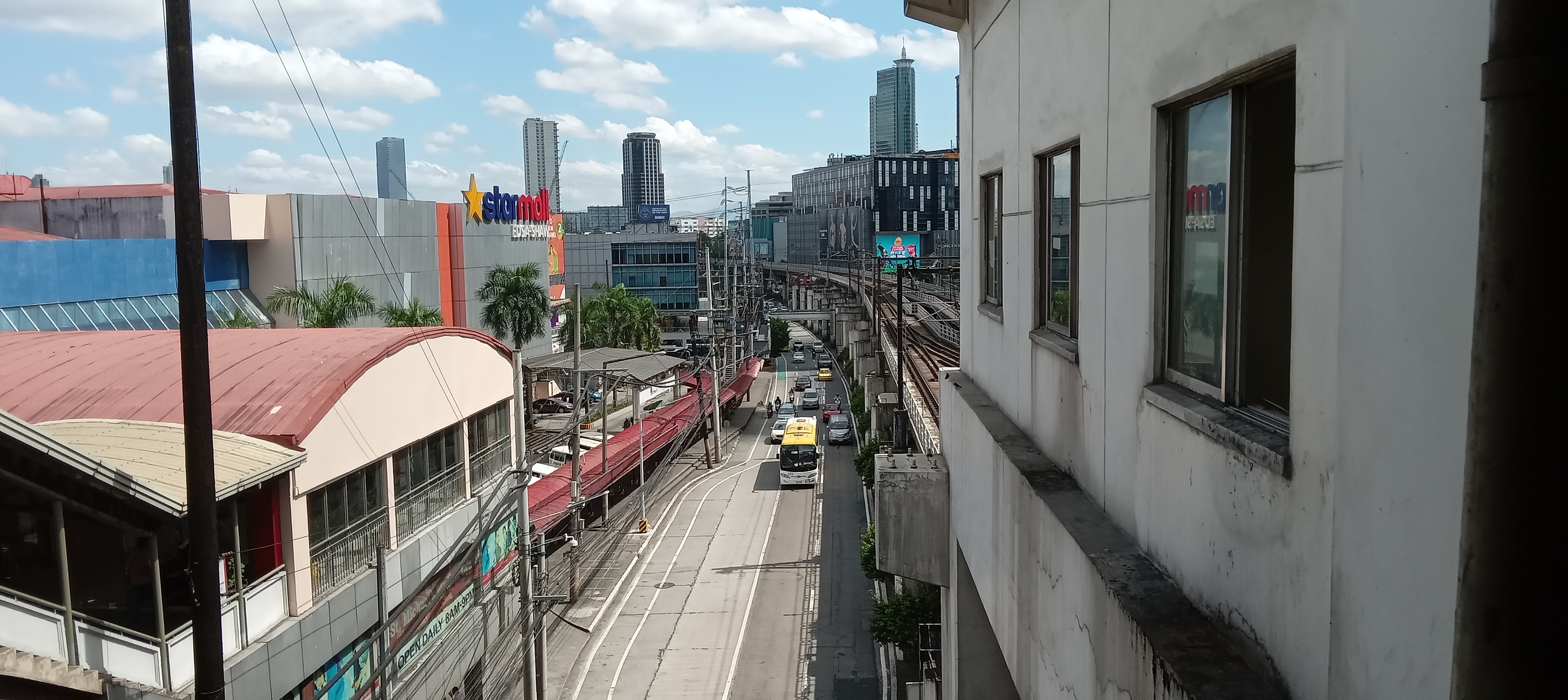
View of EDSA from Shangri-La concourse

The station serves the Ortigas Center and Greenfield business districts and is near three prominent shopping centers: Shangri-La Plaza, Greenfield District Pavilion (formerly EDSA Central), and Starmall EDSA-Shaw which are all connected by elevated pedestrian walkways. Commuters can also walk or take alternate forms of transportation to the EDSA Shangri-La Hotel, SM Megamall, St. Francis Square, and The Podium. Other nearby landmarks include the Cityland Grand Central Residences, Eurotel, AllBank main branch, San Miguel Corporation building, the Department of Education head office, University of Asia and the Pacific, Lourdes School of Mandaluyong, Astoria Plaza, Worldwide Corporate Center, Wack Wack Village, and the Wack Wack Golf and Country Club.

== Transportation links ==
Shaw Boulevard station is a major transfer point for commuters taking other forms of transportation such as buses, taxis, jeepneys, and UV Express. Three major jeepney and UV Express terminals are located either directly below or close to the station.

Prior to the establishment of the EDSA Busway, buses ran along EDSA below the station while approaching bus terminals at Starmall EDSA and SM Megamall. Currently, these stops are closed and there is no direct bus access to the station. Starmall EDSA serves the Ortigas–Alabang and Ortigas–Taguig P2P bus routes.

Passengers may board taxis at various locations near the station. The closest taxi stands include Starmall, Greenfield District (at Santo Cristo Street), and Shangri-La Plaza (at the entrance opposite Shaw Boulevard).

== See also ==
- List of rail transit stations in Metro Manila
- MRT Line 3 (Metro Manila)
