= Ayala station =

Train station in Makati, Philippines

Coordinates: 14°32′56.19″N 121°01′39.62″E

Ayala	YL11
- Passengers piling up on the northbound platform of Ayala station, viewed from a southbound-side passenger staircase, October 2026

General information
- Other names: Ayala Center; Ayala Avenue
- Location: EDSA, San Lorenzo & Dasmariñas; Makati, Metro Manila; Philippines
- Owner: Department of Transportation
- Operator: Department of Transportation
- Line: MRT Line 3
- Platforms: 2 (2 side)
- Tracks: 2
- Connections: E Ayala One Ayala: 10 12 17 38 40 42 45 48; EDSA Ayala: EX01 L01 N01 NR01 NR17 W01 WR01 WR18; L17 One Ayala

Construction
- Structure type: Concourse level: Elevated; Platform level: Underground
- Parking: Yes (MECC, One Ayala, Park Square, Glorietta)
- Cycle facilities: Bicycle sharing (Southbound entrance)
- Accessible: Concourse: Southbound entrance and SM Makati bridgeway only Platforms: All platforms

History
- Opened: July 20, 2000; 26 years ago

Services
Preceding station	Manila MRT	Following station
Buendia towards North Avenue	MRT Line 3	Magallanes towards Taft Avenue
Track layout
Location

Ayala station, also known as Ayala Center station and Ayala Avenue station, is an underground Metro Rail Transit (MRT) station located on the MRT Line 3 (MRT-3) system in Makati. It is one of two underground stations that can be found on the line, the other being Buendia. The station is named so due to its proximity to two places bearing the Ayala name: Ayala Center and Ayala Avenue.

The station is the eleventh station for trains headed to Taft Avenue and the third station for trains headed to North Avenue. The most recognizable landmark near the station is Ayala Center, one of the most popular shopping centers in the Philippines. It is one of two stations that are considered within the Makati Central Business District (the other being Buendia).

It is one of six stations on the line where passengers can catch a train going in the opposite direction without paying a new fare due to the station's layout. The other five stations are Araneta Center-Cubao, Shaw Boulevard, Boni, Buendia, and Taft Avenue. Excluding Araneta Center-Cubao station, it is also one of five stations on the line with its concourse level located above the platform.

The station also hosts retail spaces within the station, similar to Shaw Boulevard station. The retail spaces surround the concourse level of the station above the main platform and is integrated with the adjacent One Ayala.

== History ==
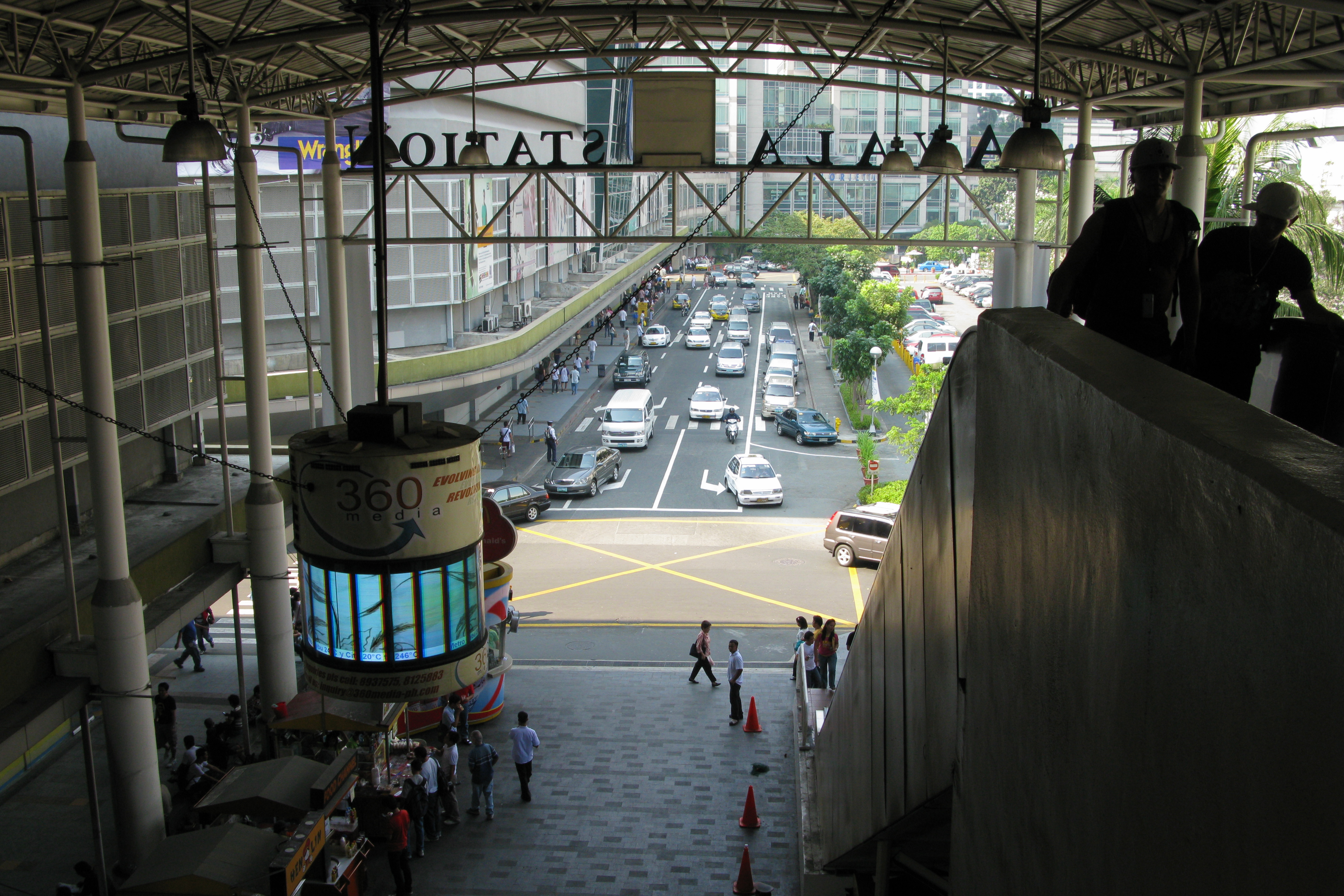
Exit facing Ayala Center in 2009

Ayala station was opened on July 20, 2000, when MRT's operation was extended south to Taft Avenue, after previously operating between Buendia and North Avenue beginning in 1999. Its opening was delayed due to inclusion of additional work orders by Department of Transportation and Communications (DOTC), including the Tramo Flyover in Pasay. Aside from SM Makati, the station was initially linked to the EDSA Carpark in Ayala Center, which was closed on December 31, 2015, for demolition to be replaced by One Ayala. Beginning in the early 2020s, the retail area on the station's concourse underwent renovations as part of its integration with One Ayala. The direct connection to the complex officially opened on December 1, 2022.

== Nearby landmarks ==
The station is at the heart of the Makati Central Business District. It has an elevated walkway that connects it to SM Makati and to One Ayala, both at Ayala Center. It provides direct access to Ayala Center through the station's main entrance located between SM Makati and One Ayala. The station is also the closest to adjacent Forbes Park, Dasmariñas, and Urdaneta villages, Apartment Ridge row, which were also developed by the Ayalas, as well as Bonifacio Global City (BGC) via McKinley Road.

Major financial headquarters of Bank of the Philippine Islands (under reconstruction), China Bank, HSBC Philippines, Citibank Philippines, and Standard Chartered Bank Philippines are all within the station's vicinity.

Nearby hotels include Ascott Makati, Holiday Inn & Suites Makati, Fairmont Makati/Raffles Makati, Makati Shangri-La Hotel, The Peninsula Manila, Dusit Thani Manila, Crown Regency Hotel, Hotel Celeste, Jinjiang Inn Makati, Astoria Greenbelt, Makati Diamond Hotel, and New World Makati Hotel. The Ayala Triangle Gardens, Ayala Museum, Filipinas Heritage Library, and the Asian Institute of Management are also nearby.

== Transportation links ==
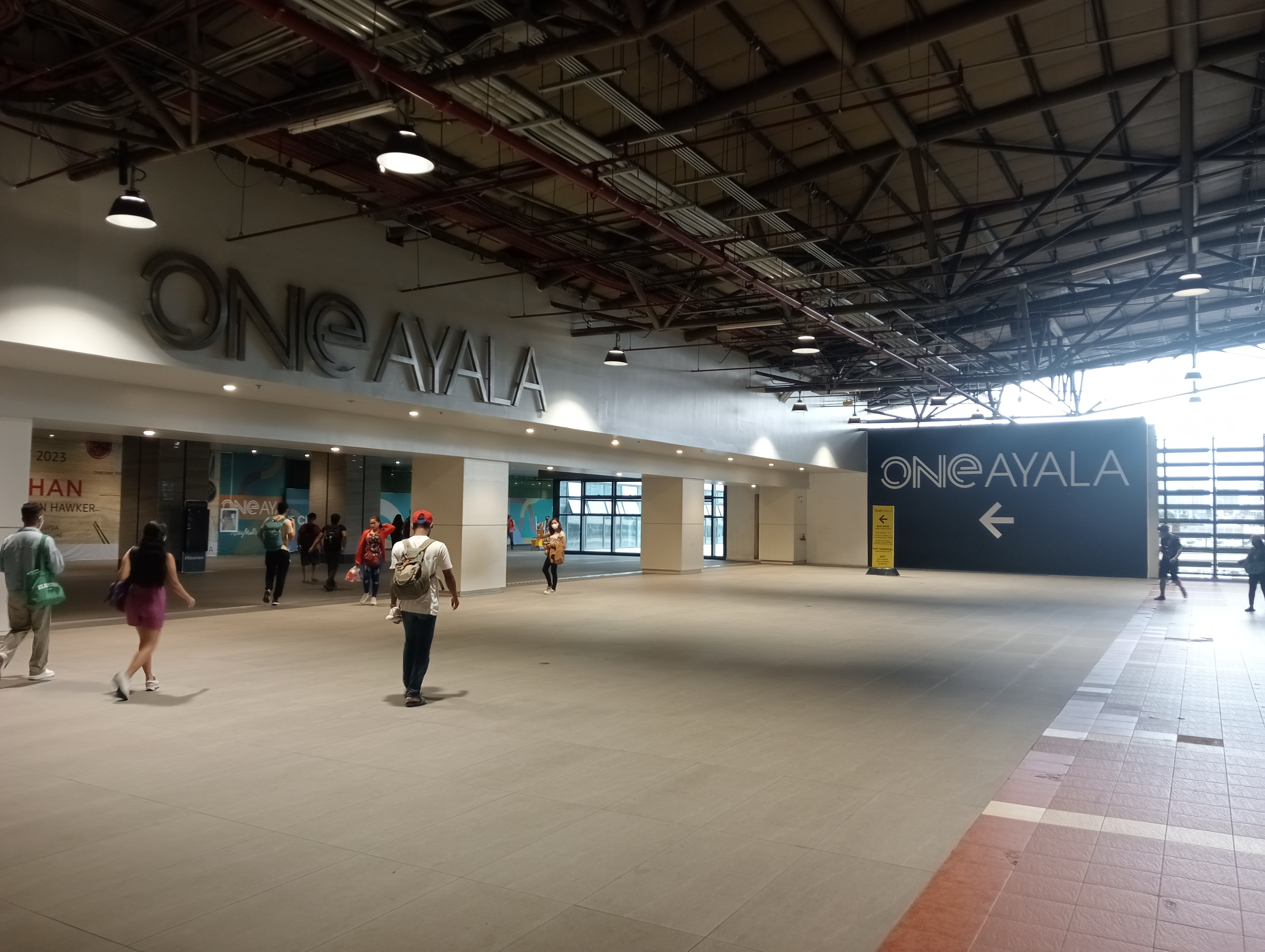
Entrance to One Ayala

The station is a major transportation hub with multiple bus stops nearby. Passengers can board buses within Metro Manila, including the EDSA Carousel, and to provinces at One Ayala, Ayala Avenue, and McKinley Exchange Corporate Center. Point-to-point buses are available at One Ayala, The Landmark, Greenbelt, and Legazpi Village. The BGC Bus terminal at McKinley Exchange Corporate Center offers buses to different destinations in BGC. Jeepneys to the Makati Central Business District, BGC, Makati, Pateros, and Pasay can be boarded at McKinley Road, One Ayala, or The Landmark, respectively. UV Express vans to Metro Manila and nearby provinces are available at One Ayala. Taxis stop at McKinley Exchange Corporate Center, SM Makati, Glorietta 4, and The Landmark.

A bicycle-sharing system is provided by Moovr within the Makati and BGC vicinity, with a rental hub located at the southbound entrance of Ayala station.

== Gallery ==
The station as seen from Ayala Footbridge

Westbound Station Exterior

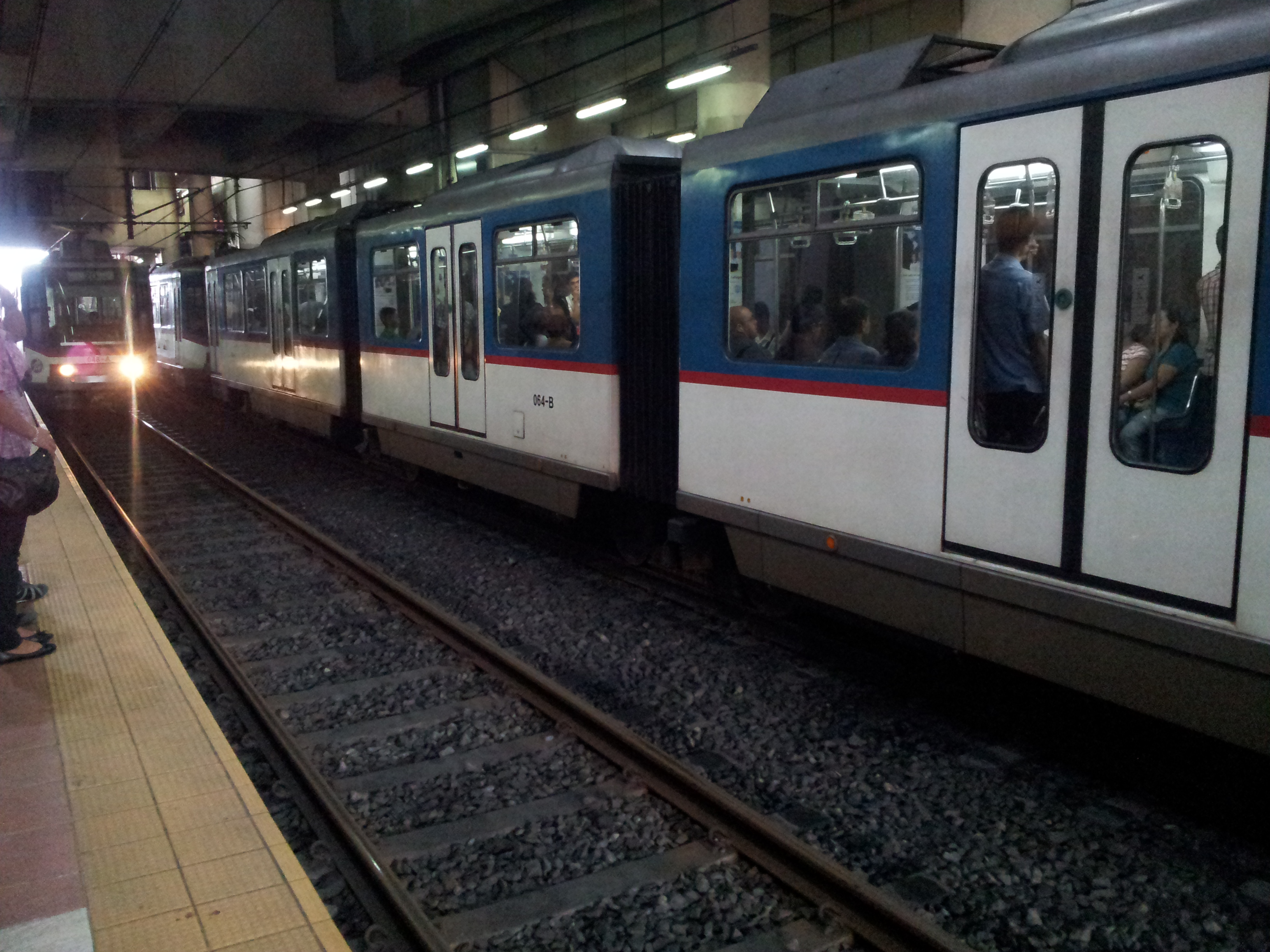
A view from the northbound platform

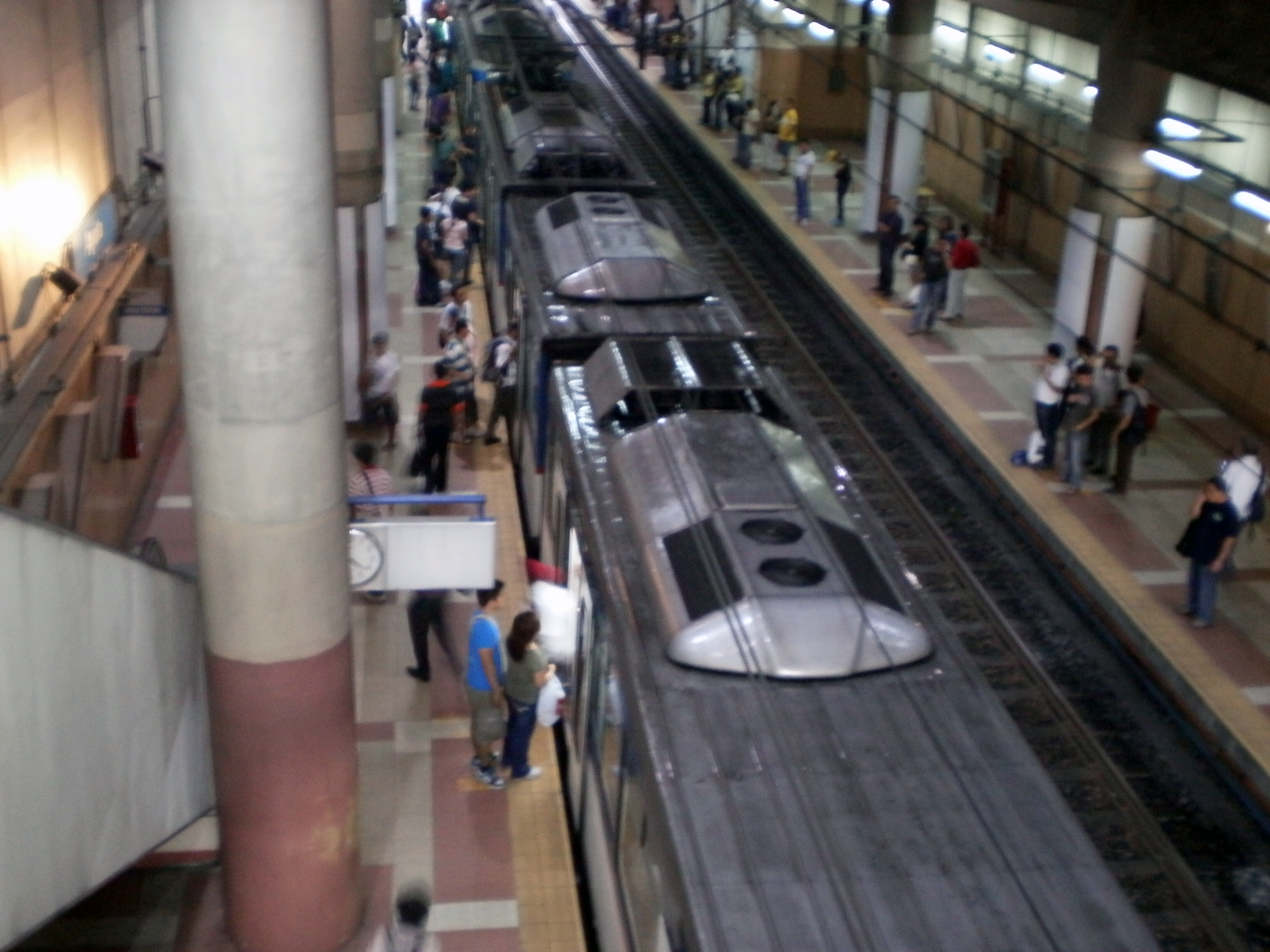
Platform area from escalator

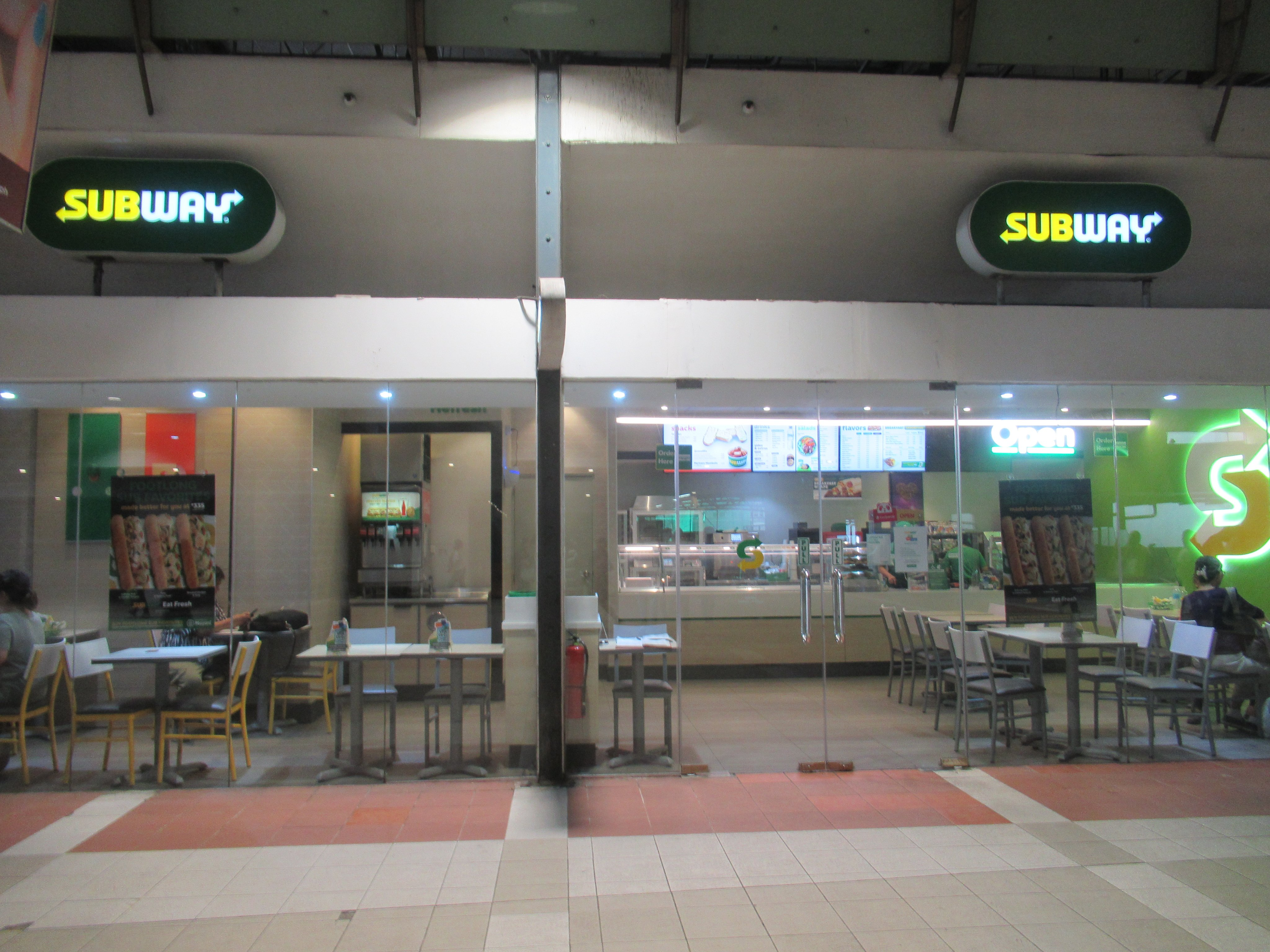
A Subway branch at Ayala station

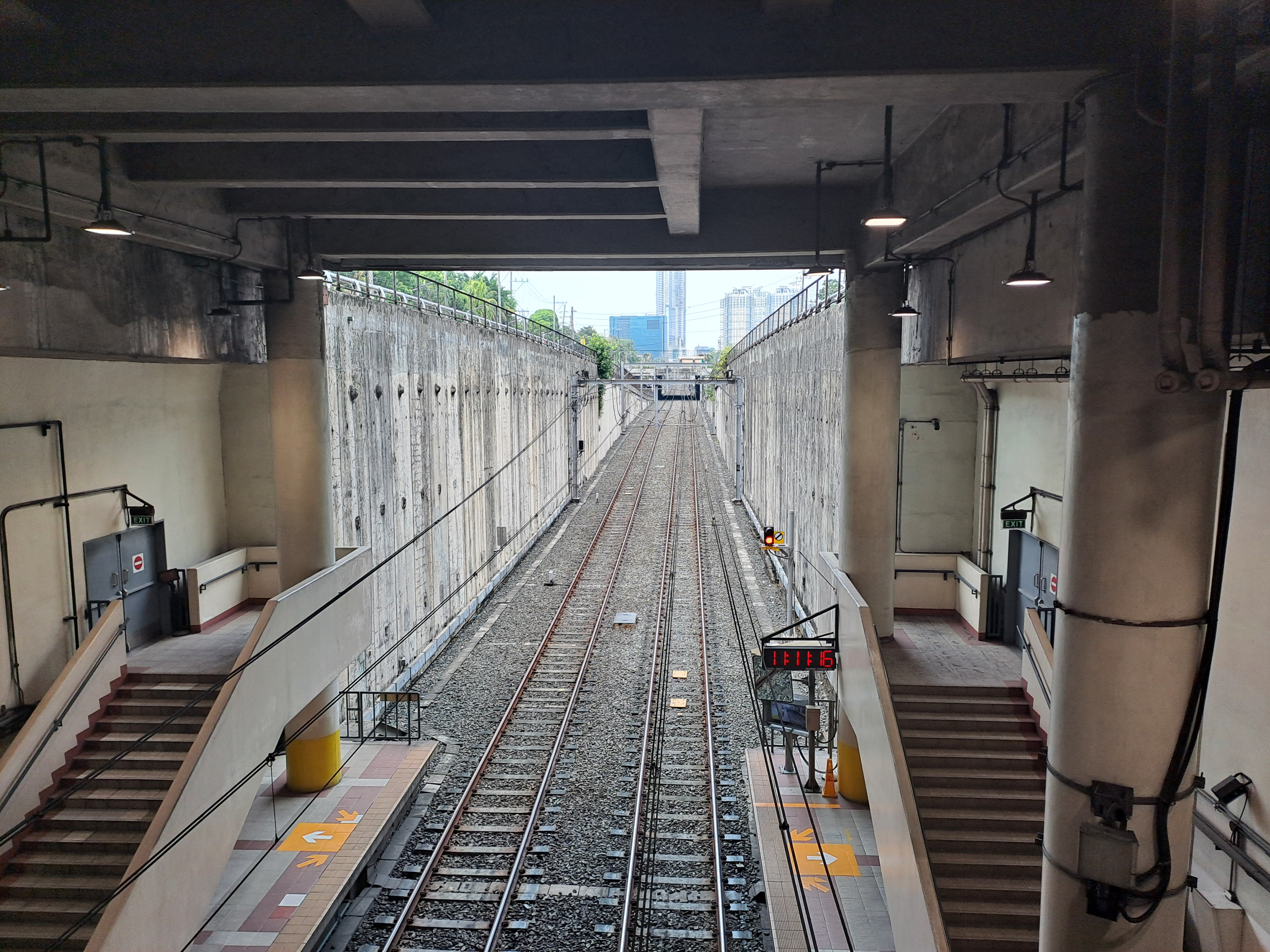
MRT-3 tracks looking south towards Magallanes

== See also ==
- List of rail transit stations in Metro Manila
- Manila Metro Rail Transit System Line 3
