= Araneta Center–Cubao station =

Araneta Center–Cubao station may refer to:

- Araneta Center–Cubao station (LRT), a station on the Manila Light Rail Transit System Line 2 (Line 2)
- Araneta Center–Cubao station (MRT), a station on the Manila Metro Rail Transit System Line 3 (Line 3)
