= Robinsons Cyberscape =

Coordinates: 14°35′22″N 121°03′41″E

Robinsons Cyberscape is an office development located in Ortigas Center within Pasig City, Metro Manila. Owned by Robinsons Land Corporation, the development was initially composed of Robinsons Cyberscape Alpha (Tower One) and Robinsons Cyberscape Beta (Tower Two) with a total of 80,000 square meters (861,112.83 square feet) of additional leasable space in the Ortigas CBD upon its turnover in 2016. The development was later expanded with the completion of Robinsons Cyberscape Gamma in 2018 and Robinsons Cyber Omega in 2021.

== Design and features ==
Robinsons Cyberscape was designed by architect Jose Siao Ling and Associates. It features floor plates ranging between 1,400 and 2,000 square meters (15,069.47 and 21,527.82 square feet). The total building height of the Alpha tower is 93 meters above the ground floor level, with basements extending 30 meters below ground floor level. The building is primarily intended for business process outsourcing companies.

== Robinsons Cyberscape Alpha ==
Robinsons Cyberscape Alpha is situated between Sapphire and Garnet Roads in Ortigas Center, Pasig. The building comprises 21 office floors with both high and low zones, along with 7 basements. It offers warm shell office spaces, column-free office areas, high-speed elevators, 100% backup power, a VRV air conditioning system, CCTV surveillance, and 24/7 security and fire protection systems. Constructed in 2013, this 26-story building is conveniently located near Robinsons Galleria, and just a few meters away from EDSA and Ortigas Avenue. The tower accommodates office spaces, a hotel and retail units on the ground floor. Robinsons Cyberscape Alpha is currently the home to a branch of Emerson Electric.

== Robinsons Cyberscape Beta ==
Robinsons Cyberscape Beta is located between Topaz and Ruby Roads, Ortigas Center, Pasig. The 37-story building with 28 office floors has a typical floor plate of 1,480.66 square meters per floor. It has four basements and seven podium parking floors, VRF System type of aircon system, 100% back-up and emergency power provisions and fire protection and sprinkler system and alarm system provisions.

== See also ==
- Robinsons Cybergate
