= Robinsons Cybergate =

Mixed-use development in Mandaluyong, Philippines

Coordinates: 14°34′14″N 121°02′55″E

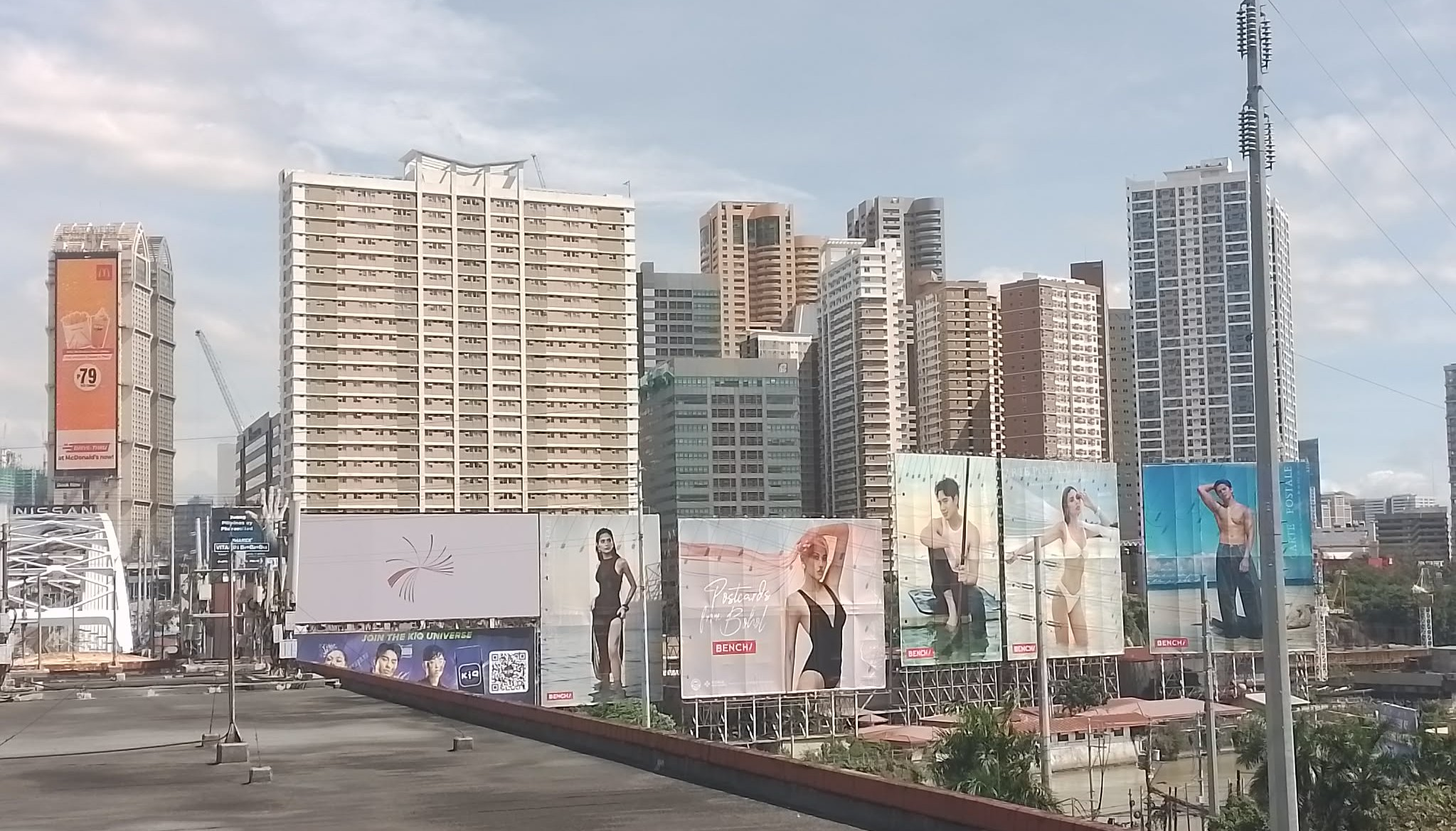
- Robinsons Cybergate as seen from Guadalupe station, Makati

Project
- Opening date: 2004 (Forum Robinsons)
- Developer: Robinsons Land Corporation
- Architect: Robinsons Cybergate Towers only: Pimentel, Rodriguez, Simbulan & Partners; Gateway Garden Ridges only: W.V. Coscolluela & Associates
- Operator: Robinsons Land Corporation
- Owner: JG Summit Holdings
- Website: Robinsons Land Corporation

Physical features
- Transport: Boni station E Guadalupe; Guadalupe Ferry Station

Location
- Interactive map of Robinsons Cybergate
- Location: Barangka Ilaya, Mandaluyong, Metro Manila, Philippines

Area
  - Total: 7.18 ha (17.7 acres)

Robinsons Cybergate, also known as Robinsons Cybergate Complex and Cybergate City, is a 7.18-hectare (17.7-acre) mixed-use urban development located along EDSA corner Pioneer Street in Mandaluyong, Philippines. Owned and developed by Robinsons Land Corporation, the property development arm of JG Summit Holdings, the development is anchored by four office buildings named Robinsons Cybergate Center Towers 1, 2, 3 and Robinsons Cybergate Plaza, which also has a Go Hotel branch occupying the tower, as well as five residential condominium complexes.

The site is a Philippine Economic Zone Authority (PEZA) certified economic zone, and has a close proximity to public transportation terminals along EDSA, such as the Boni station of the MRT Line 3, the Guadalupe Bus Stop of the EDSA Busway, and the Guadalupe Ferry Station of the Pasig River Ferry Service, located across the Guadalupe Bridge.

Aside from the current Robinsons Cybergate complex in Mandaluyong, another development owned by Robinsons Land Corporation shared the same name, known as Robinsons Cybergate Cebu, which started development in 2010. It is located in near Chung Hua in Osmeña Boulevard, Cebu City.

== Structures ==
=== Office buildings ===
Robinsons Cybergate Center Tower 2

The Robinsons Cybergate features four office towers located within the property that is primarily occupied by business process outsourcing companies. Offices under the Robinsons Land Corporation also occupy the office spaces within the complex.

==== Robinsons Cybergate Center Tower 1 ====
The Robinsons Cybergate Center Tower 1 is a 18-storey office building located along Cybergate Street. Built in October 2005, the tower was completed in 2006 and serves as one of the first office tower to be completed within the area. The tower is designed by Pimentel Rodriguez Simbulan & Partners (PRSP) Architects, while Monolith Construction & Development Corporation serves as the general contractor, and D.M. Consunji, Inc. serves as the engineering consultant of the project. The architectural design of the tower features a linear mixture of both concrete and glass in its facade. The tower has a total office space of 26,000 m^{2} (279,861.67 sq ft), and features three elevated parking levels, two basement parking levels, and 13 office levels and its tenants include Sitel and Accenture.

==== Robinsons Cybergate Center Tower 2 ====
The Robinsons Cybergate Center Tower 2 is a 27-storey office building located along the corner of Cybergate Street and Pioneer Street. Built and completed in 2006, the tower was also designed by Pimentel Rodriguez Simbulan & Partners (PRSP) Architects, while Monolith Construction & Development Corporation also serves as the general contractor of the project, and D.M. Consunji, Inc. serves as the tower's primary engineering consultant. Similar to the adjacent Cybergate Center Tower 1, the architectural design of the tower also features a vertical mixture of both concrete and glass in its facade. The tower has a total floor area of 42,000 m^{2} (452,084.24 sq ft) of office space and features four elevated parking levels, two basement parking levels, and 21 office levels, The tower is occupied by Accenture and Winsource Business Solutions.

==== Robinsons Cybergate Center Tower 3 ====
The Robinsons Cybergate Center Tower 3 is a 27-storey office building located along Pioneer Street. Built and completed in 2008, the tower has a total office space of 42,000 m^{2} (452,084.24 sq ft), while the tower's gross leasable area is 44,614 m^{2} (480,221.10 sq ft), and features a ground floor lobby podium with restaurants and a cafeteria, four elevated parking levels, two basement parking levels, and 21 office levels. Similar to the first two Cybergate Center Towers, the tower was also designed by Pimentel Rodriguez Simbulan & Partners (PRSP) Architects, and the architectural design of the tower also features a vertical mixture of both concrete and glass in its facade. The tower's tenants include Summit Media Philippines, Avalon Edunet Plus, Inc., Global Strategic Business Process Solutions, MHI Power Technical Services Corporation, Prople BPO, Inc., RR Donnelly Philippines, Inc., and TTEC.

==== Robinsons Cybergate Plaza ====
The Robinsons Cybergate Plaza is a 12-storey mixed-use tower located along the corner of EDSA and Cybergate Street. Built and completed in September 2009, the tower is designed by Jose Siao Ling & Associates (JSLA) Architects, while Monolith Construction & Development Corporation serves as the project's general contractor, and features a similar design to the other first three Cybergate office towers, which features a vertical mixture of both concrete and glass in its facade, and has a total office space of 25,900 m^{2} (278,785.28 sq ft). The tower features 7 office floors, two hotel floors, two podium parking floors, and a basement parking floor. The tower also hosts the Go Hotels Plus Mandaluyong, a 223-room 3-star budget hotel located on the tower's fifth and sixth floors, separated between Standard and Superior Rooms with 130 Twin-Bed or Triple-Bedrooms and 93 Queen-size Bedrooms. The hotel also features function rooms, a breakfast cafe with a self-serving coffee station, and a co-working area.

The tower's office tenants include the Robinsons Hotels and Resorts, the hotel and resort development arm of the Robinsons Land Corporation, which occupies the seventh floor of the tower; the Foundever Career Center; the Convey Health Solutions Philippines, Inc., which occupies the tower's tenth floor; and the Office of the Vice President of the Philippines (OVP), which occupies the eleventh floor of the tower in 2022, under the tenure of Vice President Sara Duterte.

=== Residential buildings ===
- Axis Residences
- Gateway Garden Ridge
- Gateway Garden Heights
- One Gateway Place
- Gateway Regency
- Gateway Regency Studios

=== Shopping center ===
- Forum Robinsons (closed; Robinsons Place Pioneer from 2004 to 2009)

== See also ==
- Ortigas Center
- Robinsons Cyberscape
- Greenfield District
- Bonifacio Global City
- Rockwell Center
