= Araneta Center–Cubao station (MRT) =

Elevated passenger train station in Cubao, Quezon City, Philippines

Coordinates: 14°37′09.95″N 121°03′03.73″E

Araneta Center–Cubao	YL04
- Passengers piling up on the southbound platform (right) of the MRT-3 Araneta Center–Cubao station, October 2026

General information
- Location: EDSA, San Martin De Porres & Socorro; Quezon City, Metro Manila; Philippines
- Owner: Department of Transportation
- Operator: Department of Transportation
- Line: MRT Line 3
- Platforms: 2 (2 side)
- Tracks: 2
- Connections: Araneta Center–Cubao; 3 Cubao; 51 53 61 Araneta City Bus Port; Araneta City Bus Port; 1 Cubao; Future: E Cubao

Construction
- Structure type: Elevated
- Parking: Yes (Farmers Plaza, South Parking Garage, Gateway Mall)
- Accessible: Concourse: All entrances Platforms: All platforms

History
- Opened: December 15, 1999; 26 years ago

Services
Preceding station	Manila MRT	Following station
GMA–Kamuning towards North Avenue	MRT Line 3	Santolan–Annapolis towards Taft Avenue

Out-of-system interchange
Preceding station	Manila LRT	Following station
Anonas towards Antipolo	LRT Line 2 transfer at Araneta Center–Cubao	Betty Go-Belmonte towards Recto
Track layout
Location

Araneta Center–Cubao station, also known as Araneta–Cubao or simply as Cubao, rarely known as Araneta, is an elevated Metro Rail Transit (MRT) station located on the MRT Line 3 (MRT-3) system in Cubao, Quezon City. It is named after the old name of the Araneta City, a mixed-used development in the city.

The station is the fourth station for trains headed to Taft Avenue and the tenth station for trains headed to North Avenue. It is one of five stations on the line where passengers can catch a train going in the opposite direction without paying a new fare due to the station's layout. The other four stations are Shaw Boulevard, Boni, Buendia, Ayala, and Taft Avenue. It is also the only station on the line with its concourse level located below the platform.

== History ==
Araneta Center–Cubao station was opened on December 15, 1999, as part of MRT's initial section from North Avenue to Buendia.

== Nearby establishments ==
The most recognizable landmark that the station is located at is Araneta City, a mixed-use complex which hosts shopping malls such as Gateway Mall, Ali Mall, and Farmers Plaza. It also hosts an indoor arena, the Smart Araneta Coliseum. Hotel such as Nice Hotel and Vista Hotel are located west of the station.

== Transportation links ==
Due to its location at Araneta City, the station is located in a major transportation hub. Prior to the establishment of the EDSA Carousel, provincial buses stopped at the Araneta Center Bus Terminal within the complex. Currently, the EDSA Carousel does not stop at Cubao and as such, is served by other bus routes. Jeepneys for various destinations all over Metro Manila and Rizal province, taxis and tricycles are available upon request. Traffic regulations, however, prohibit tricycles on EDSA and Aurora Boulevard.

The station is also the transfer point for commuters riding the Manila Light Rail Transit System Line 2, or Line 2. Through a walkway, it is directly connected to New Farmers Plaza, which in turn leads to the namesake station on the Line 2, the station's entrance just outside the Gateway Mall, and the Smart Araneta Coliseum.

== Gallery ==
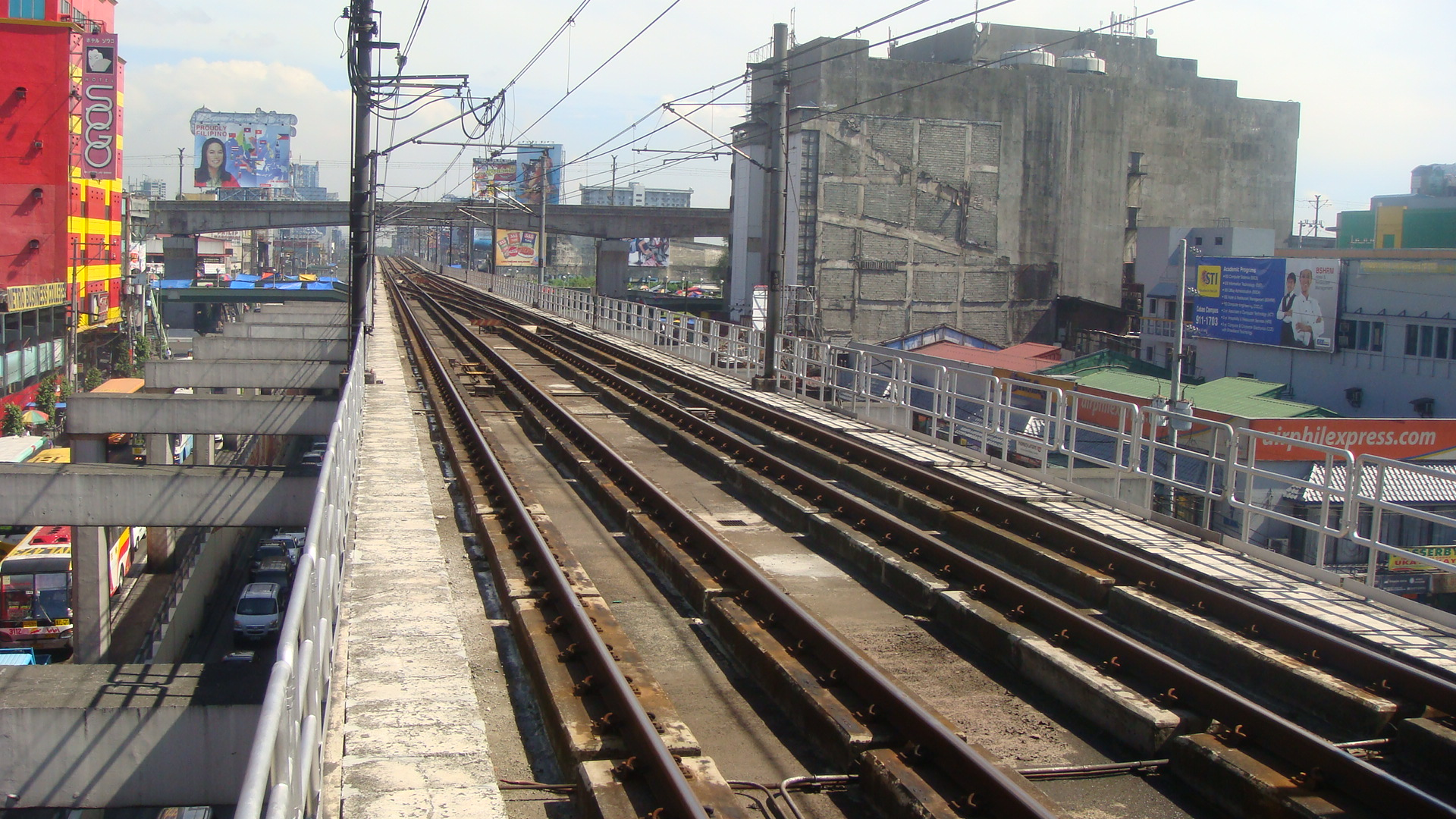
View of nearby Cubao buildings

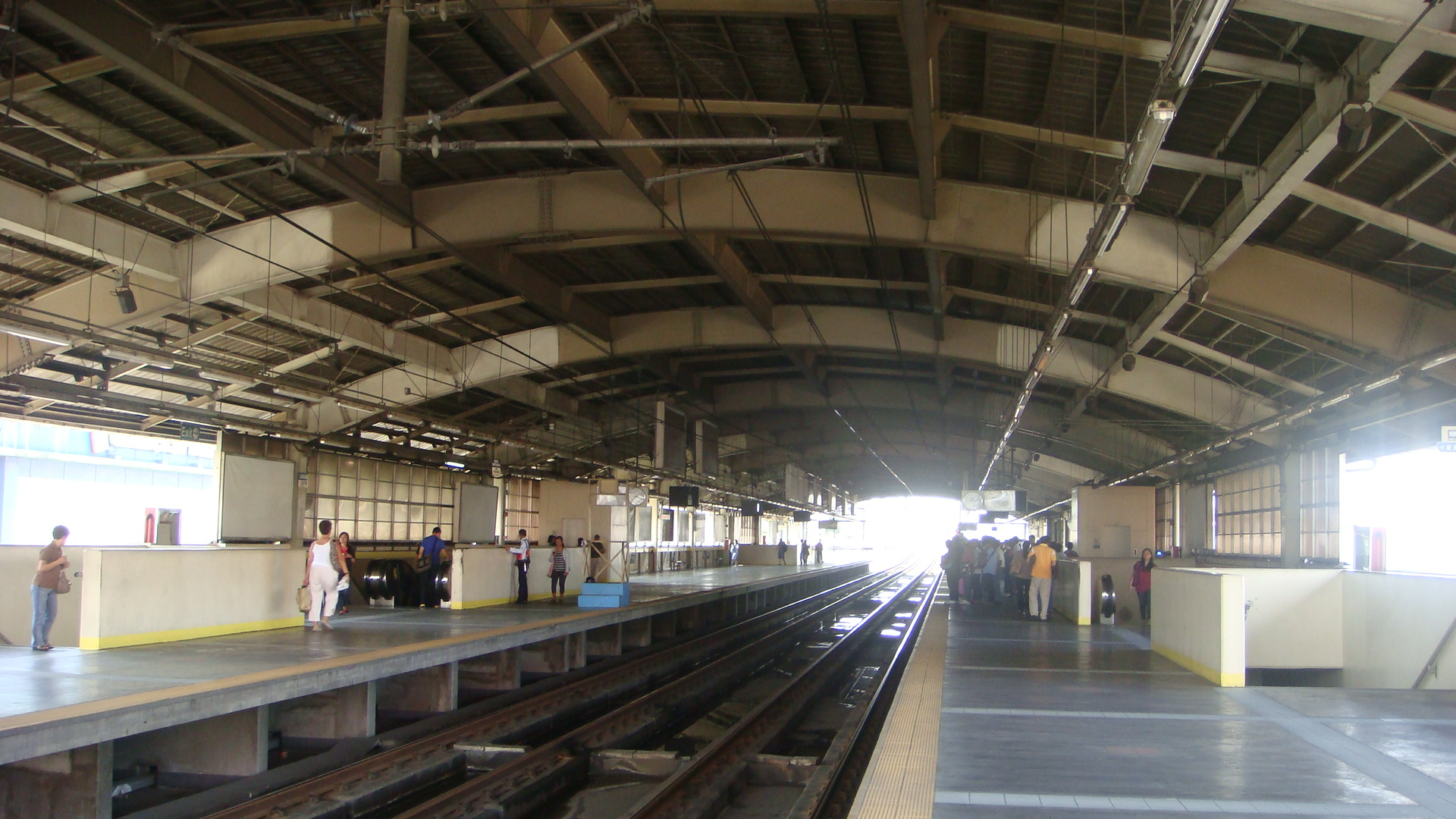
Platform area

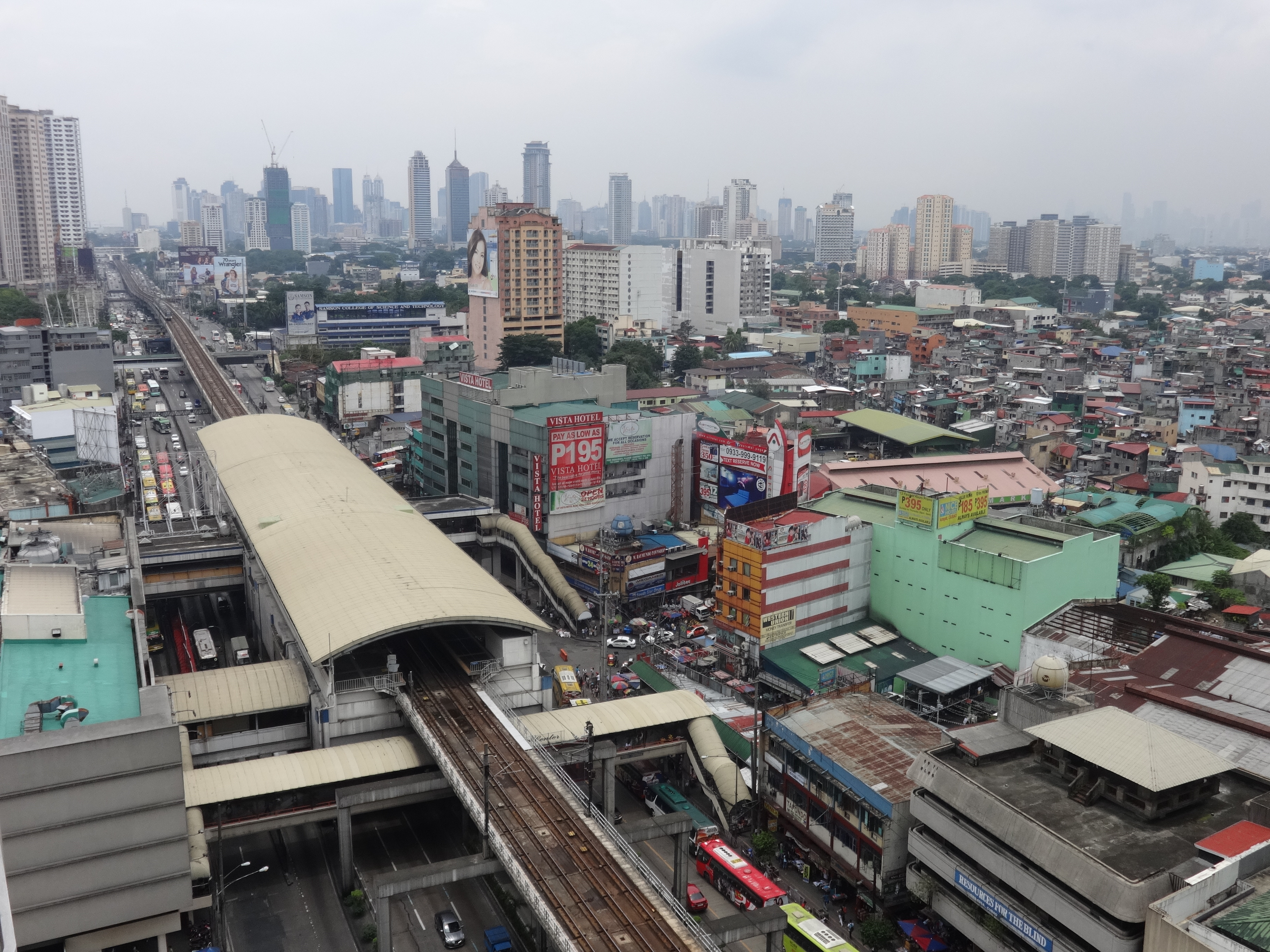
View from the Vivaldi Residences Cubao

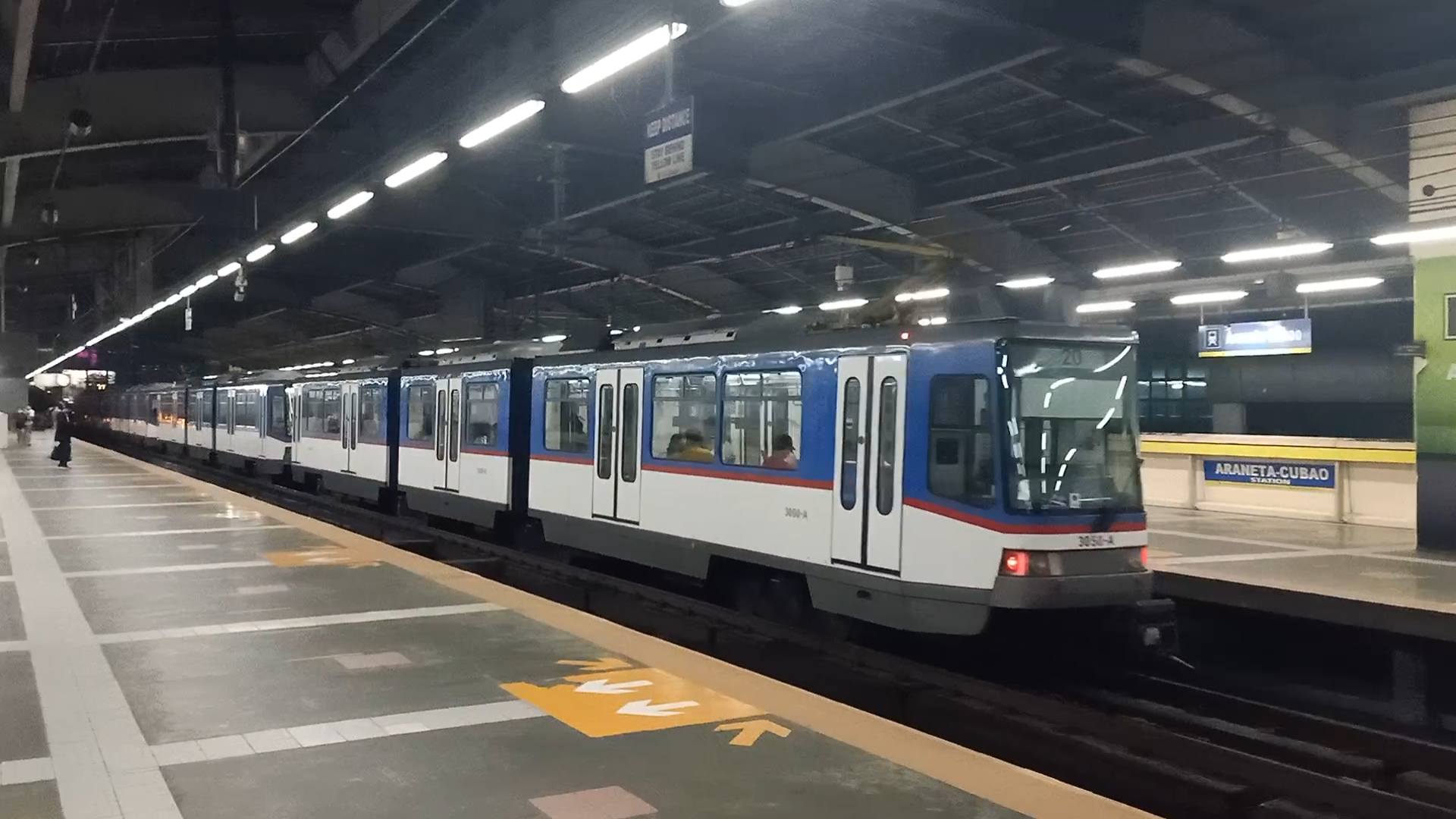
A four-car MRTC 3000 class train at Araneta Center-Cubao station in April 2022

Station exterior

== See also ==
- List of rail transit stations in Metro Manila
- Manila Metro Rail Transit System Line 3
- Media related to Araneta Center-Cubao station (Line 3) at Wikimedia Commons
