= Pioneer Street =

Road in the Philippines

Coordinates: 14°34′19″N 121°3′14″E

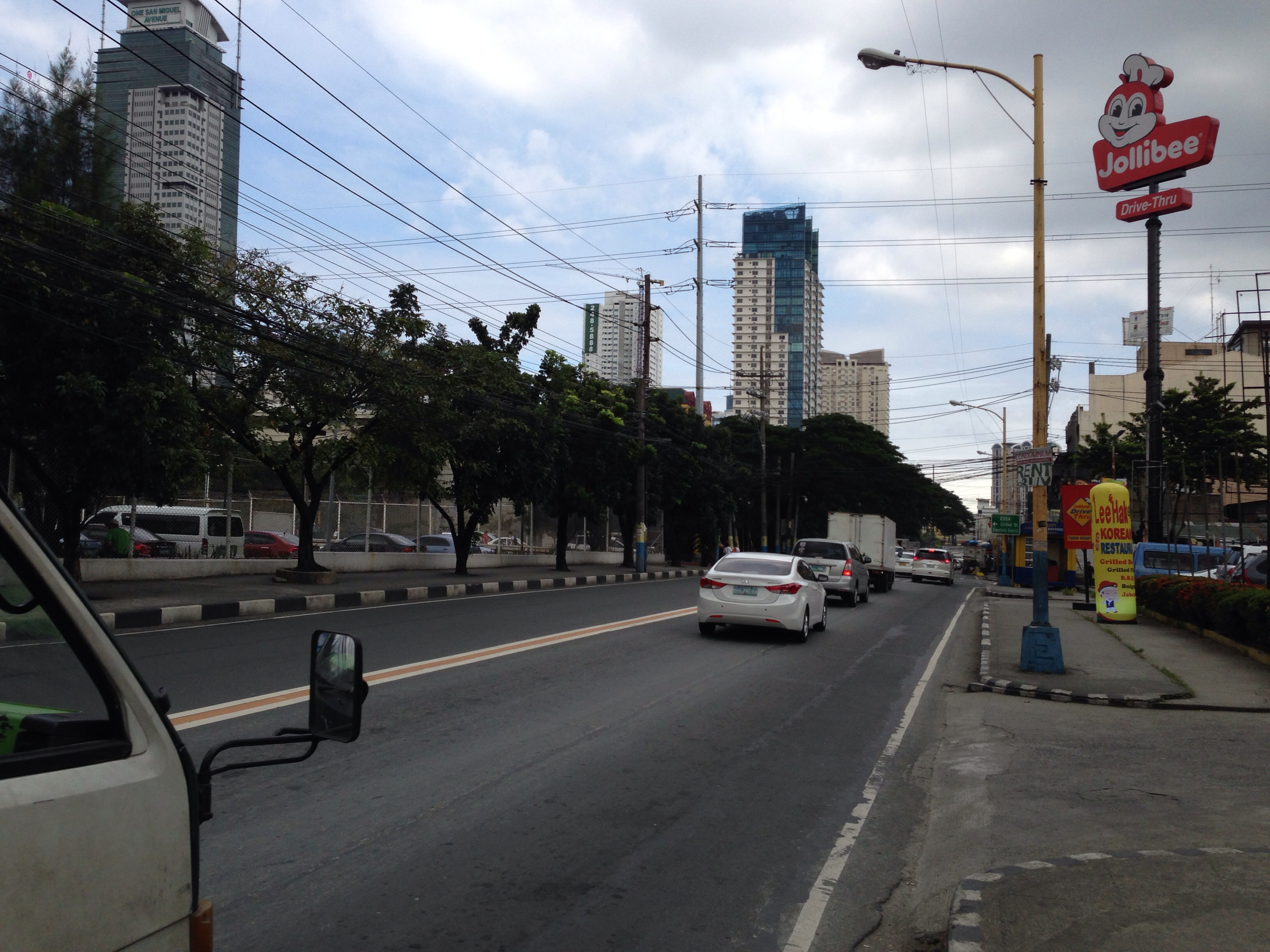
- Pioneer Street links Robinsons Cybergate Complex with Ortigas Center.
- Interactive map of Pioneer Street
- Maintained by: Department of Public Works and Highways - Metro Manila 1st District Engineering Office
- Length: 1.6 km (0.99 mi)
- West end: AH 26 (N1) (Epifanio de los Santos Avenue) in Mandaluyong
- East end: N141 (Shaw Boulevard) in Pasig

Pioneer Street is the continuation of Boni Avenue east of Epifanio de los Santos Avenue (EDSA) in eastern Metro Manila, Philippines. The street has four lanes for most of its course, beginning at the EDSA junction in Barangka Ilaya, Mandaluyong, where traffic emerges from the Boni Avenue tunnel, up to its easternmost point at the Shaw Boulevard junction at the boundary of barangays Kapitolyo and San Antonio in Pasig, adjacent to Ortigas Center. En route, it passes through the Robinsons Cybergate Complex, where Forum Robinsons is located, the United Laboratories plant, and Greenfield District, a mixed-use development south of Ortigas Center by the junction with Shaw Boulevard. Pioneer Street is also the location of several new condominium developments, call center sites and a few strip malls. It is served by Boni Station of the MRT-3 at EDSA.

== Route description ==
Pioneer Street begins at EDSA in Mandaluyong. In front of the former site of Forum Robinsons and the Cybergate complex, the street curves eastward. The section between Madison Street and Reliance Street is a one-way road for eastbound traffic.

The street soon enters the Pasig at Barangay Kapitolyo and finally terminates at the intersection with Shaw Boulevard. It continues to Barangay San Antonio as General Roxas Street.

== Intersections ==
Province	City/Municipality	km	mi	Destinations	Notes
Mandaluyong				AH 26 (N1) (EDSA) – Monumento	Western terminus.
Mandaluyong				Cybergate Street	
Mandaluyong				East end of EDSA–Boni Tunnel	
Mandaluyong				Madison Street	Road becomes one-way eastbound.
Mandaluyong				Sheridan Street	
Mandaluyong–Pasig boundary				Reliance Street	Pioneer becomes two-way road. No left turn on Reliance Street southbound. Access to TV5 Media Center and AH 26 (N1) (EDSA).
Pasig				Williams Street	
Pasig				United Street	Traffic light intersection. Access to Barangay Kapitolyo.
Pasig				San Rafael Street	Entrance to Pioneer Street only.
Pasig				N141 (Shaw Boulevard)	Traffic light intersection. Eastern terminus. Continues east as General Roxas Street.
1.000 mi = 1.609 km; 1.000 km = 0.621 mi: Incomplete access

== See also ==
- Boni Avenue
