= Forum Robinsons =

Shopping mall in Mandaluyong, Philippines

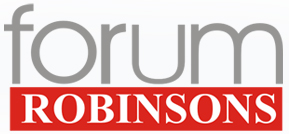

- The facade of Forum Robinsons
- Location: Mandaluyong, Metro Manila, Philippines
- Coordinates: 14°34′25″N 121°2′53″E
- Address: Epifanio De Los Santos Avenue corner Pioneer Street, Barangka Ilaya, Robinsons Cybergate Complex
- Opened: November 17, 2004; 21 years ago
- Closed: April 30, 2022; 4 years ago
- Developer: JG Summit Holdings
- Manager: Robinsons Malls
- Owner: John Gokongwei
- Num. of stores: 100
- Num. of anchor tenants: 4
- Floor area: 56,000 m^{2} (600,000 sq ft)
- Floors: 1 (1 basement level and 1 open area for parking)
- Parking: more than 1000 cars
- Public transit: Boni
- Website: Forum Robinsons

Forum Robinsons (formerly Robinsons Place Pioneer) was a shopping mall in Mandaluyong, Metro Manila, Philippines, owned and operated by Robinsons Land. The mall opened on November 17, 2004. It is the 18th mall opened by Robinsons and was its first mall in Mandaluyong. It had a gross floor area of 56,000 square meters (600,000 sq ft). The former name, Robinsons Place Pioneer, was named after its location, Pioneer Street. Back then, the mall was envisioned to become a one-stop shop for everyone in Cybergate Complex, which was conceived to become a cyber hub in the city. In 2010, the mall was renamed to its current name to re-position itself as a cyber lifestyle mall focusing on IT products and to align itself with the vision of the Cybergate Complex.

The mall closed on April 30, 2022, to give way for its redevelopment works, originally set to start in early 2020 but delayed due to the COVID-19 pandemic in the Philippines. The redevelopment will feature a six-storey mall and four new office towers dubbed "The Jewel."

== See also ==
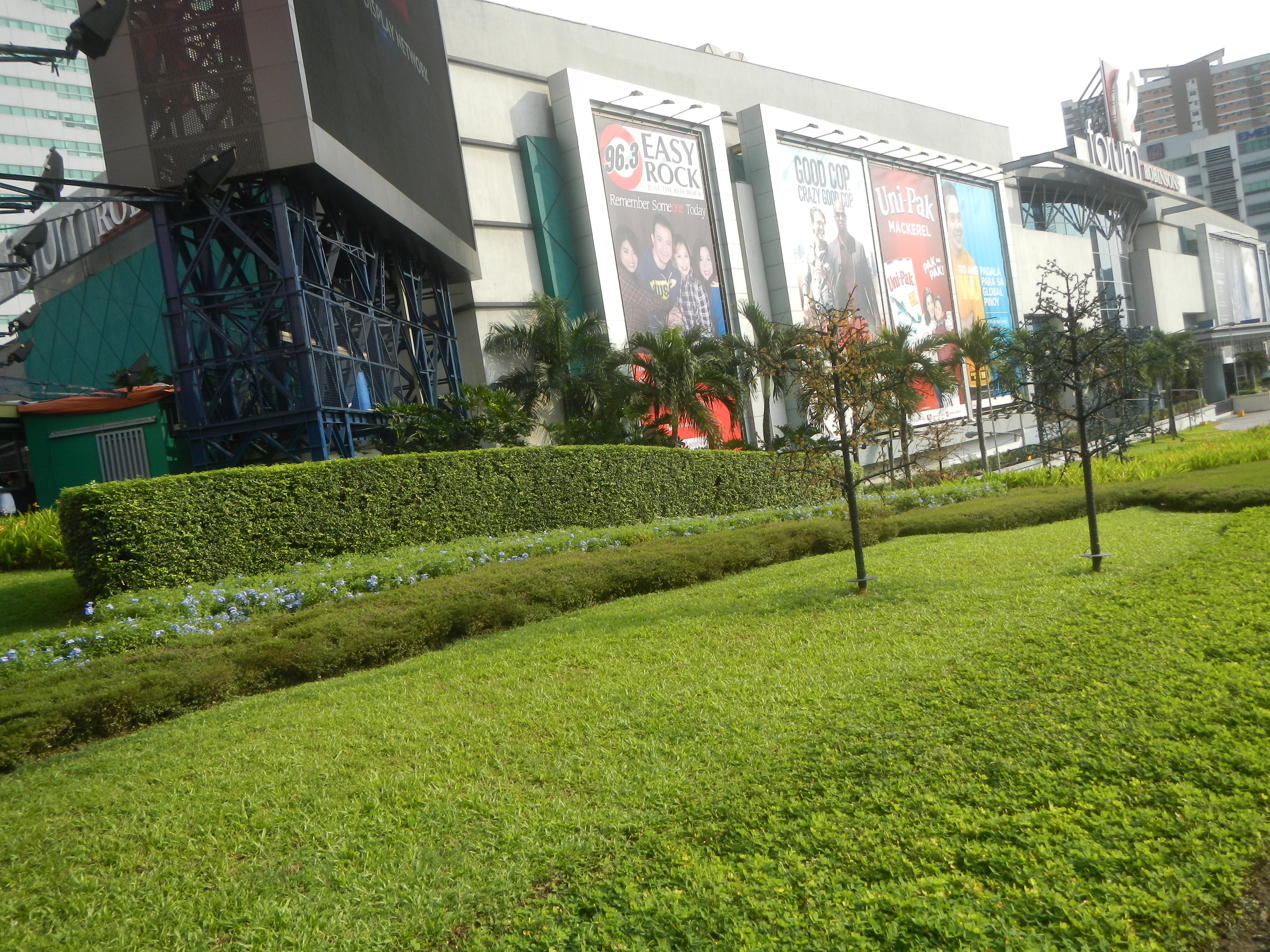
Landscaping around Forum Robinsons

- Robinsons Galleria
