= Boni station =

Train station in Mandaluyong, Philippines

Coordinates: 14°34′25.55″N 121°02′53.4″E

Boni	YL08
- A southbound MRTC 3000 class train (right) about to depart from Boni station, October 2026

General information
- Location: EDSA, Barangka Ilaya & Malamig; Mandaluyong, Metro Manila; Philippines
- Owner: Department of Transportation
- Operator: Department of Transportation
- Line: MRT Line 3
- Platforms: 2 (1 island)
- Tracks: 2

Construction
- Structure type: At-grade
- Parking: Yes (SMDC Light Residences & Pioneer Woodlands Condominium)
- Cycle facilities: Bicycle racks (Northeast entrance)
- Accessible: Concourse: Northeast and southwest entrances Platforms: All platforms

History
- Opened: December 15, 1999; 26 years ago

Services
Preceding station	Manila MRT	Following station
Shaw Boulevard towards North Avenue	MRT Line 3	Guadalupe towards Taft Avenue
Track layout
Location

Boni station is a Metro Rail Transit (MRT) station located on the MRT Line 3 (MRT-3) system in Mandaluyong. It is named so due to its proximity to Boni Avenue, which is in turn named after the nickname of Bonifacio Javier, a World War II guerrilla leader and former mayor of Mandaluyong.

It has several restaurants and shops that surround the station, including Light Mall that is connected to the station.

It is the eighth station for trains headed to Taft Avenue and the sixth station for trains headed to North Avenue. It is the last station in Mandaluyong, before crossing over to Makati and one of five stations on the line where passengers can catch a train going in the opposite direction without paying a new fare due to the station's layout. The other four stations are Araneta Center-Cubao, Shaw Boulevard, Buendia, Ayala, and Taft Avenue. Excluding Araneta Center-Cubao station, it is also one of four stations on the line with its concourse level located above the platform.

== History ==
Boni station was opened on December 15, 1999, as part of MRT's initial section from North Avenue to Buendia. A link bridge connecting the station to SMDC Light Mall, opened in 2015, was later added.

== Nearby landmarks ==
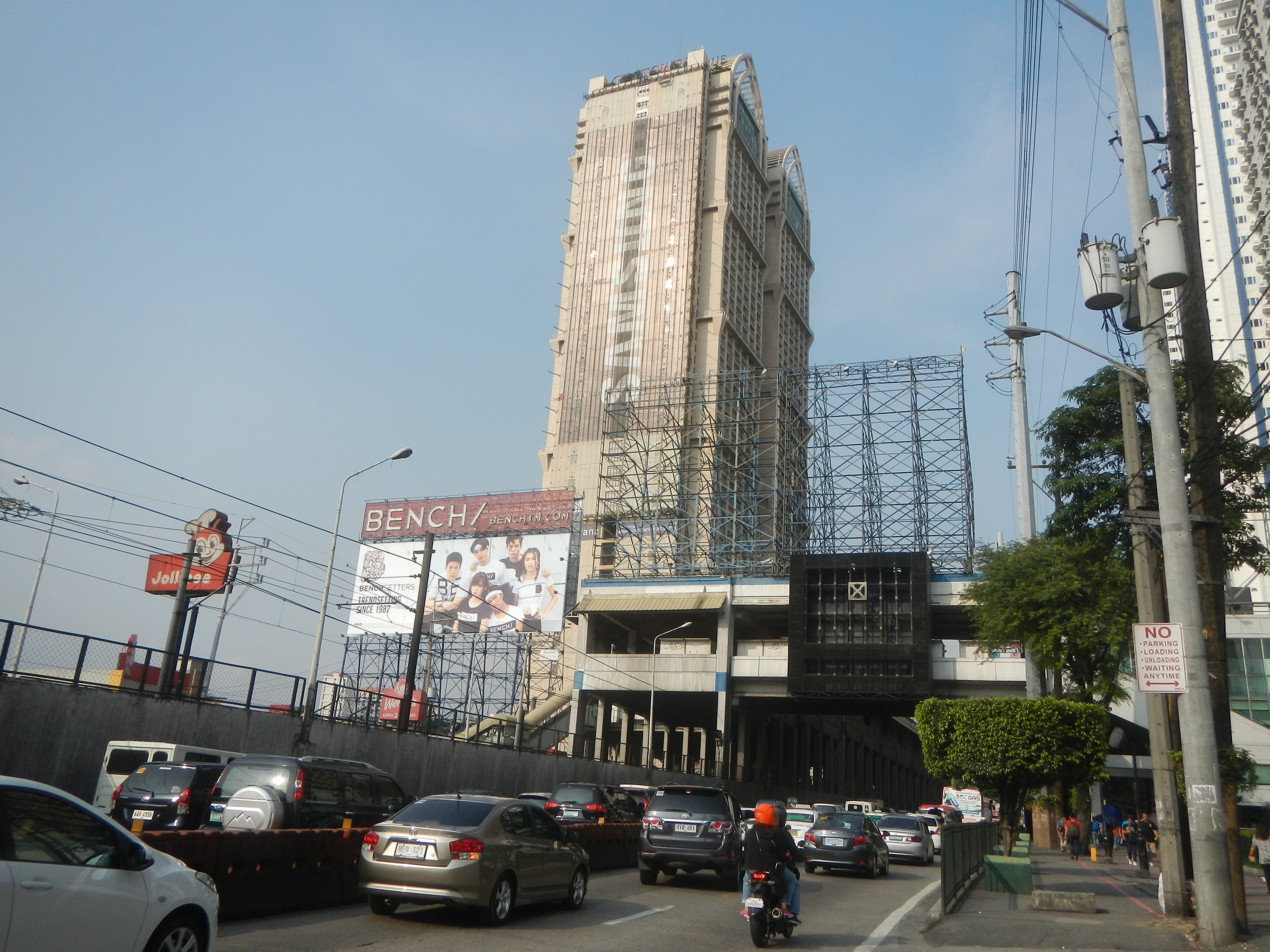
Boni station with GA Twin Tower on the background

The station serves Mandaluyong and the new Pioneer District. Its nearest landmarks include Robinsons Cybergate, Go Hotels Mandaluyong, Victor R. Potenciano Medical Center, GA Twin Tower, SMDC Light Residences, TV5 Media Center, Pioneer Woodlands Condominium, and Paragon Plaza Building. It is also located near the national headquarters of the Philippine Red Cross, Globe Telecom Plaza (former headquarters of Globe Telecom on Pioneer Street) and Rizal Technological University on Boni Avenue. The station is interconnected with SMDC Light Residences, particularly Light Mall, and Pioneer Woodlands Condominium through respective elevated walkways at the east.

== Transportation links ==
Jeepneys, buses, taxis, and tricycles are available outside the station, particularly at EDSA and as well as Pioneer and Pinatubo streets. A major jeepney terminal is located in the area, at Metromart Market, and jeepneys leaving from the terminal head for western Mandaluyong, Pasig, and Manila (Stop and Shop in the vicinity of Santa Mesa). A major tricycle terminal is also found nearby, serving destinations in Mandaluyong. Its proximity to Rizal Technological University and other colleges in the area makes the station a popular stop for students.

== See also ==
- List of rail transit stations in Metro Manila
- Manila Metro Rail Transit System Line 3
