= Buendia station (MRT) =

Train station in Makati, Philippines

Coordinates: 14°33′15.13″N 121°02′02.74″E

Buendia	YL10
- A northbound MRTC 3000 class train (left) arriving at Buendia station, October 2026

General information
- Location: EDSA, Forbes Park & Urdaneta; Makati, Metro Manila; Philippines
- Owner: Department of Transportation
- Operator: Department of Transportation
- Line: MRT Line 3
- Platforms: 2 (1 island)
- Tracks: 2
- Connections: E Buendia; 42 Buendia MRT

Construction
- Structure type: Concourse level: Elevated; Platform level: Underground
- Cycle facilities: Bicycle racks (Northbound entrance)
- Accessible: Concourse: All entrances Platforms: All platforms

History
- Opened: December 15, 1999; 26 years ago
- Former names: Gil Puyat Avenue

Services
Preceding station	Manila MRT	Following station
Guadalupe towards North Avenue	MRT Line 3	Ayala towards Taft Avenue
Track layout
Location

Buendia station is an underground Metro Rail Transit (MRT) station located on the MRT Line 3 (MRT-3) system in Makati. It is one of two underground stations that can be found on the line, the other being Ayala. The station lies near the EDSA–Kalayaan Flyover and Gil Puyat Avenue (Buendia Avenue; hence the current one was supposed to be the station's name) in Makati.

It is the tenth station for trains headed to Taft Avenue and the fourth station for trains headed to North Avenue. It is the second to the last station south of the Pasig River and is also the last underground station in the line before the line goes above ground at Guadalupe station. It is one of five stations on the line where passengers can catch a train going in the opposite direction without paying a new fare due to the station's layout. The other four stations are Araneta Center–Cubao, Shaw Boulevard, Boni, Ayala, and Taft Avenue. Excluding Araneta Center–Cubao station, it is also one of four stations on the line with its concourse level located above the platform.

== History ==
Buendia station was opened on December 15, 1999, as part of MRT's initial section from this station to North Avenue. It served as the line's southern terminus until Taft Avenue station and two intermediate stations in Makati opened on July 20, 2000, after delays due to the inclusion of additional work orders by the Department of Transportation and Communications (DOTC), including the Tramo Flyover in Pasay.

== Nearby landmarks ==
The station serves the Makati Central Business District and is the nearest station to the Department of Trade and Industry offices; as well as the headquarters of major banks like Development Bank of the Philippines and Banco de Oro. Several business process outsourcing (BPO) buildings line the avenue right outside the station, including those in SM Cyber Two. The famous Makati Avenue and Jupiter Street entertainment districts, and Century City, can also be accessed from this station via taxi or jeepneys. Posh residential subdivisions such as Forbes Park, Bel-Air, and Urdaneta Villages are found in the vicinity of the station.

== Transportation links ==
The station has jeepneys, buses, and taxicabs outside the station. Jeepneys that ply the area of the station head along Gil Puyat Avenue (Buendia) for western Makati, the Central Business District, and Pasay. The Buendia station of EDSA Carousel, located along EDSA, is interconnected to the MRT station through a pedestrian footbridge. The station's western entrance also serves as a bus stop of the Malanday–Ayala city bus heading south towards One Ayala.

== See also ==
- List of rail transit stations in Metro Manila
- MRT Line 3 (Metro Manila)
