= North Avenue station (MRT) =

Elevated passenger train station in Quezon City, Philippines

Coordinates: 14°39′08.8″N 121°01′55.8″E

North Avenue	YL01
- A northbound MRTC 3000 class train arriving at North Avenue station, October 2026

General information
- Location: EDSA, Philam & Bagong Pag-asa; Quezon City, Metro Manila; Philippines
- Owner: Department of Transportation
- Operator: Department of Transportation
- Line: MRT Line 3
- Platforms: 2 (2 side)
- Tracks: 2
- Connections: E North Avenue

Construction
- Structure type: Elevated
- Parking: Yes (TriNoma)
- Accessible: Concourse: All entrances Platforms: All platforms

History
- Opened: December 15, 1999; 26 years ago

Services
Preceding station	Manila MRT	Following station
Terminus	MRT Line 3	Quezon Avenue towards Taft Avenue
Track layout
Location

North Avenue station is an elevated Metro Rail Transit (MRT) station on the MRT Line 3 (MRT-3). Located on the Epifanio de los Santos Avenue (EDSA) in Quezon City along the border of barangays Philam and Bagong Pag-asa, it is named after the adjacent North Avenue which intersects with EDSA. It is the current northern terminus of the line.

The North Avenue Depot, an underground depot where the trains of the line are kept and maintained, is located near the station. The elevated tracks terminate abruptly beyond the station, but there is sufficient room for a terminating train to leave the station and stop before switching to the opposite track and reentering the station to begin the journey south.

== History ==
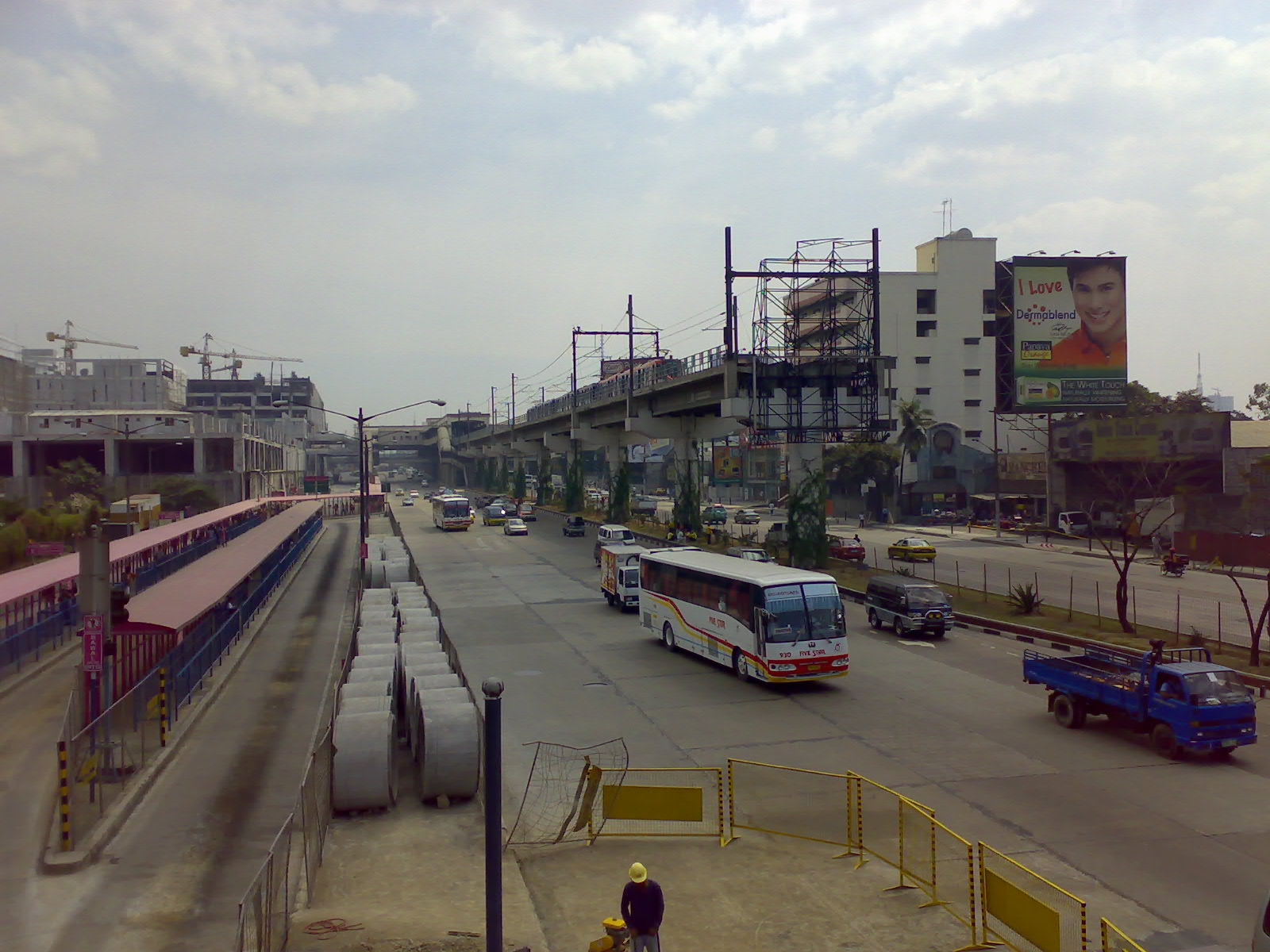
The end of the train tracks looking towards the station in 2007, predating physical interconnection with LRT Line 1

North Avenue station was planned as part of the Phase 1 of the EDSA LRT III project, following a Build-Lease-Transfer (BLT) agreement between the Department of Transportation and Communications (DOTC) and EDSA LRT Corporation on September 22, 1992. However, the project faced delays due to government investigations into the contract, and construction was postponed until the Supreme Court of the Philippines upheld the contract's legality in 1995. Construction finally began on October 15, 1996 as the MRT III project, under a BLT contract awarded to the Metro Rail Transit Corporation (MRTC), led by a consortium of local companies.

North Avenue station was opened on December 15, 1999, as part of MRT's initial section from this station to Buendia. A link bridge connecting the station to Trinoma, opened in 2007, was later added.

== Nearby landmarks ==
The station is directly connected to Trinoma. It is also close to SM North EDSA, one of the Philippines' largest malls. Other nearby landmarks include the Veritas Tower (home to the Veritas 846 studios), SM Cyber West Avenue, UNTV Broadcast Center, and Triangle Park, where Veterans Memorial Medical Center, Vertis North, Ayala Malls Vertis North, Philippine Science High School Main Campus, Quezon City Science High School, and Ninoy Aquino Parks & Wildlife Center are located. The Philippine Medical Association secretariat, Phil-Am, and Sogo Hotel North EDSA are also within reach of the station.

== Transportation links ==
North Avenue station is a major hub for buses plying the EDSA route and one of the most crowded MRT-3 stations during rush hour. Transport terminals are also located near the station, particularly at Trinoma and SM North EDSA, respectively, while the North Avenue bus stop of EDSA Carousel is located at the center island of EDSA, accessible directly from the station. Taxis, jeepneys, minibuses, and UV Express vans also stop in the vicinity.

== Gallery ==
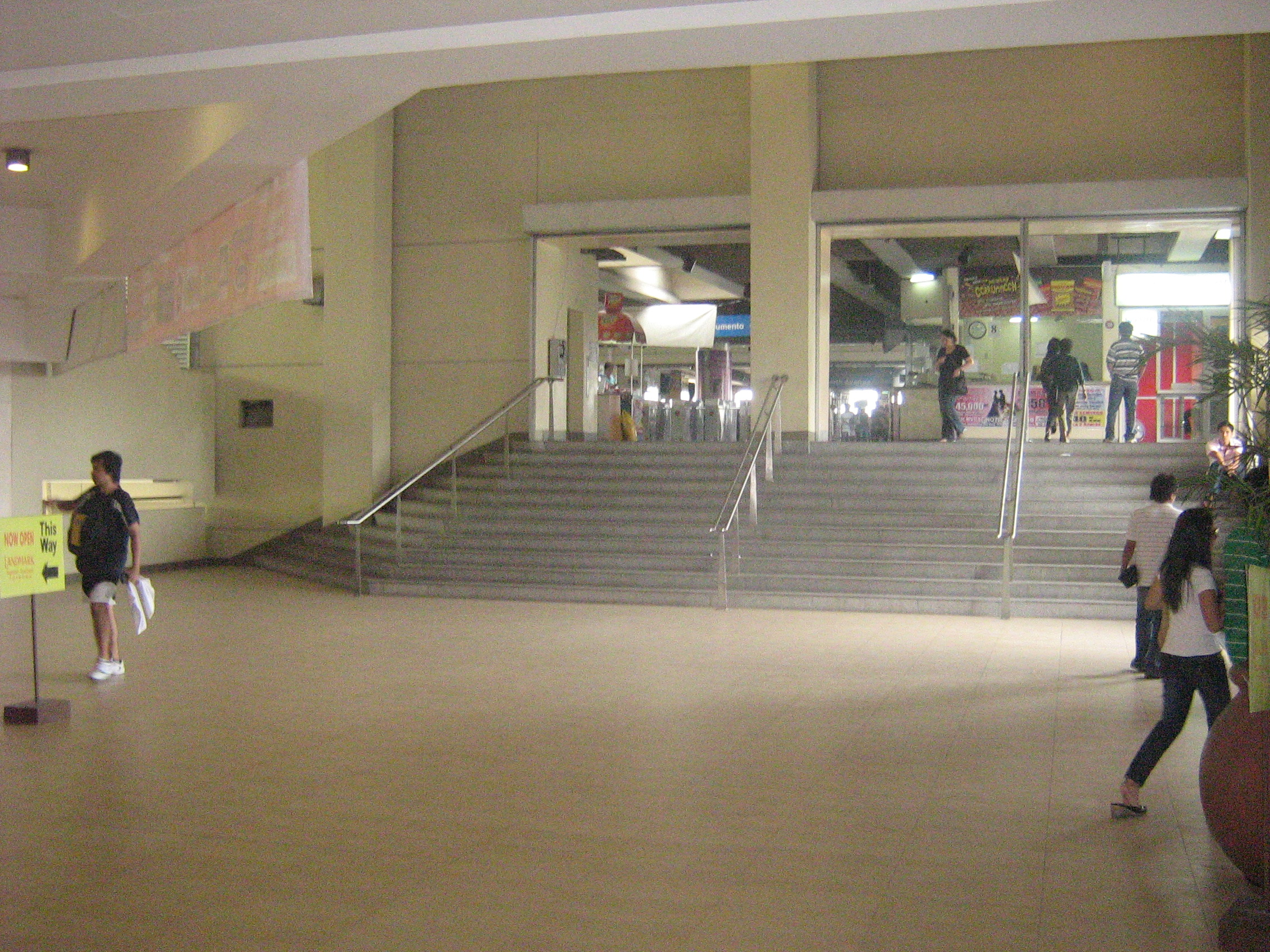
The entrance of the station from TriNoma

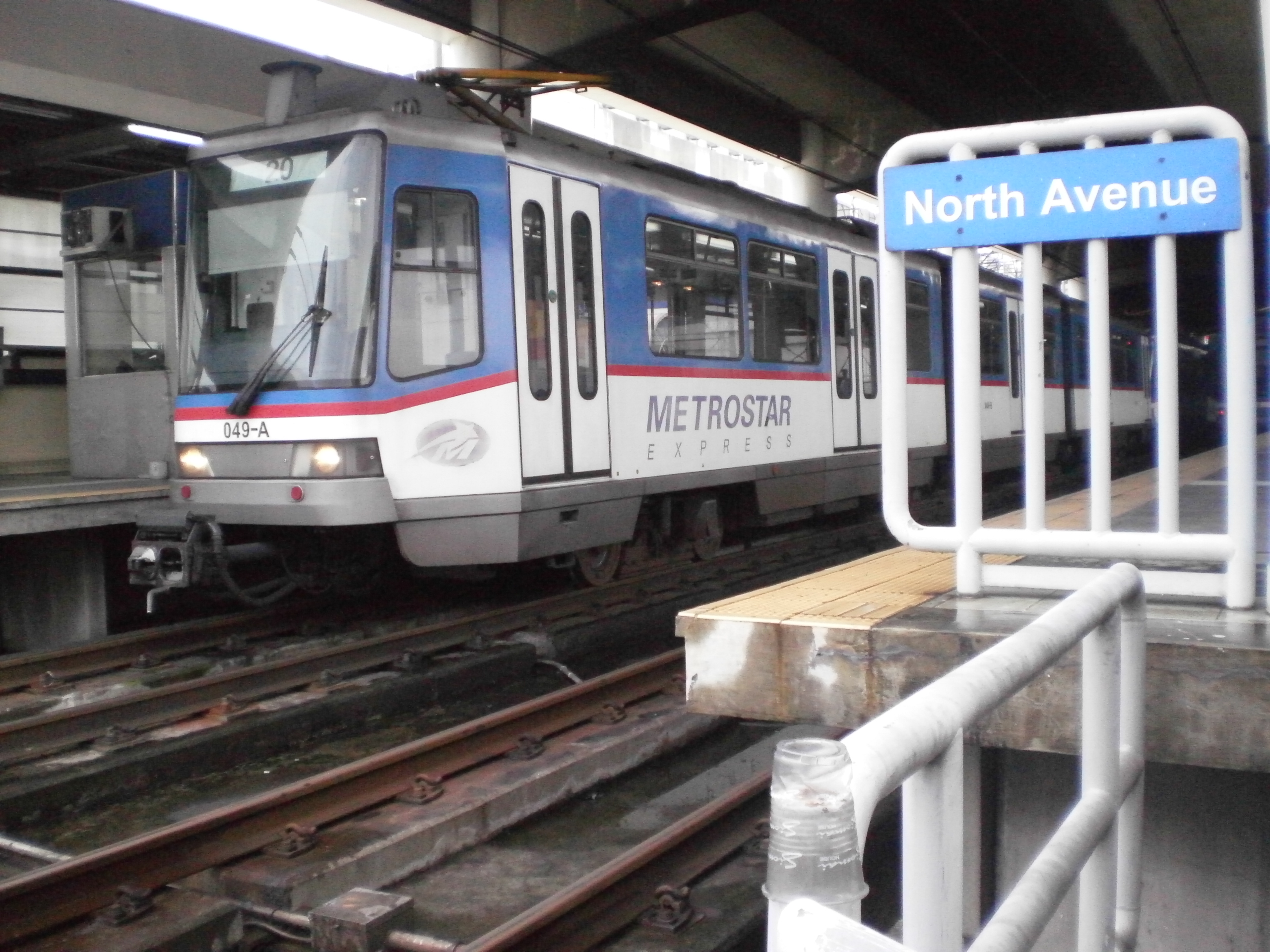
A train at the station's northbound track

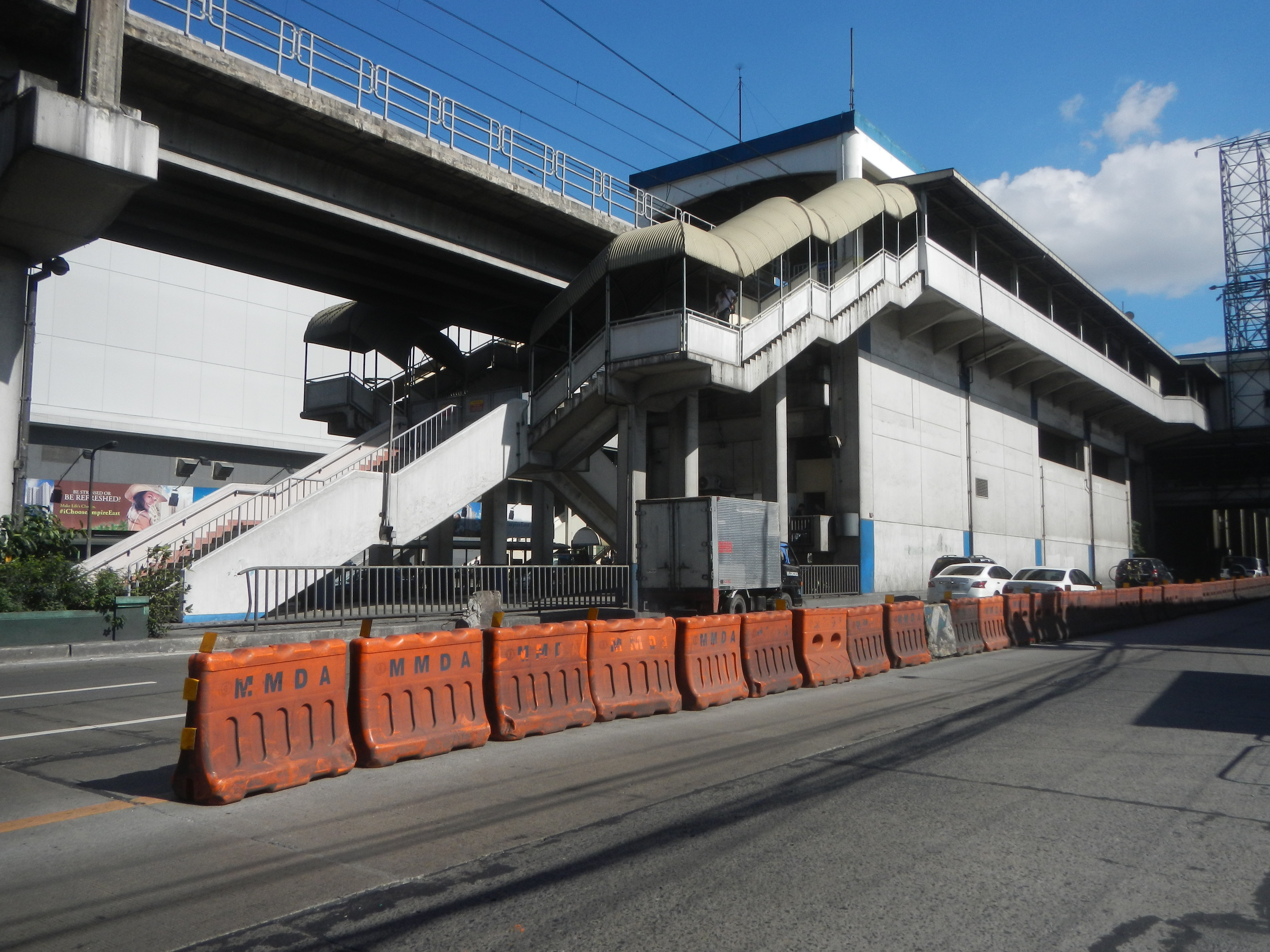
View of the station from street level

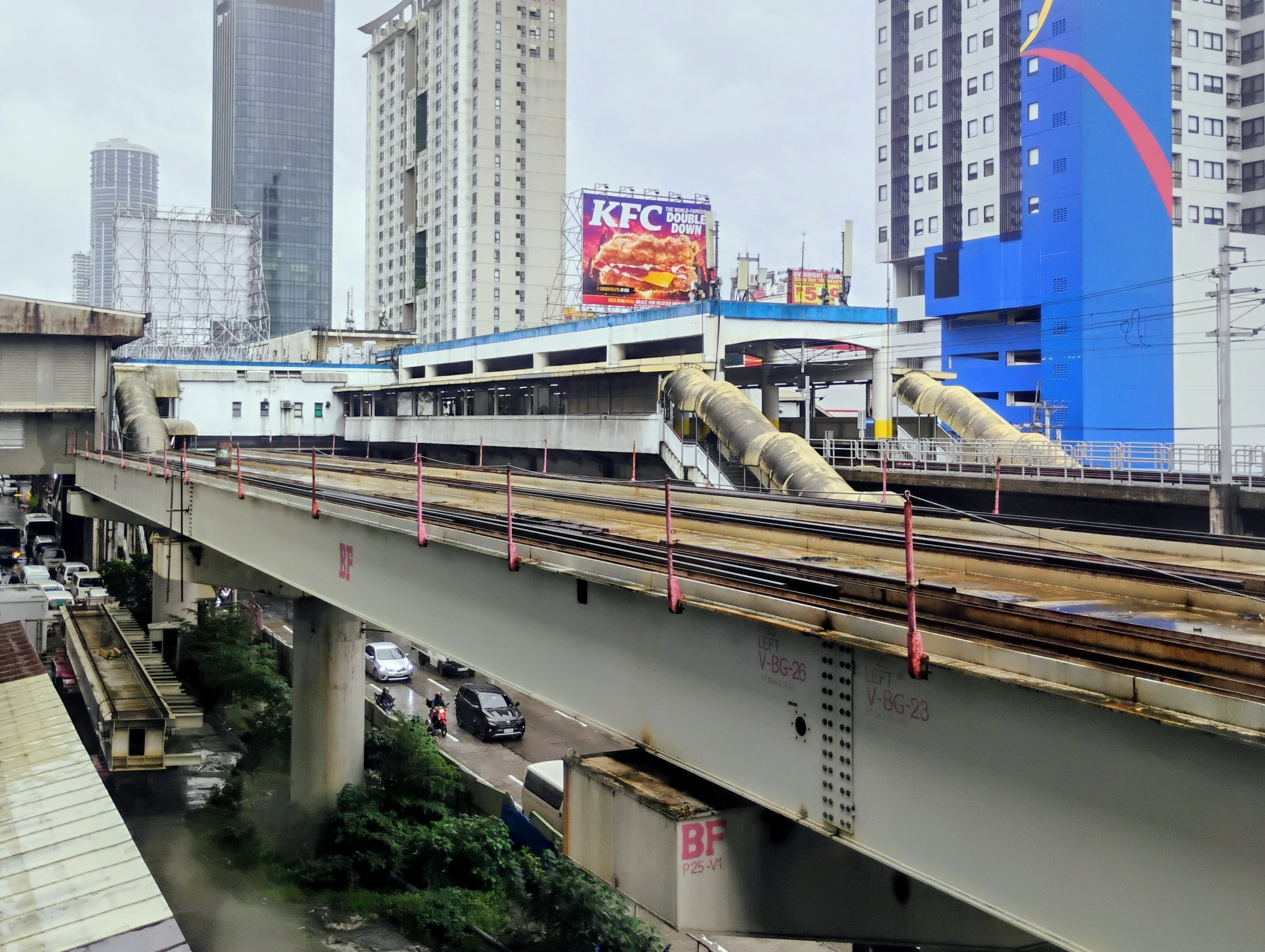
View of the station from TriNoma

== See also ==
- List of rail transit stations in Metro Manila
- Manila Metro Rail Transit System Line 3
