= Taft Avenue station =

Train station in Pasay, Philippines

Coordinates: 14°32′15.06″N 121°00′05.06″E

Taft Avenue	YL13
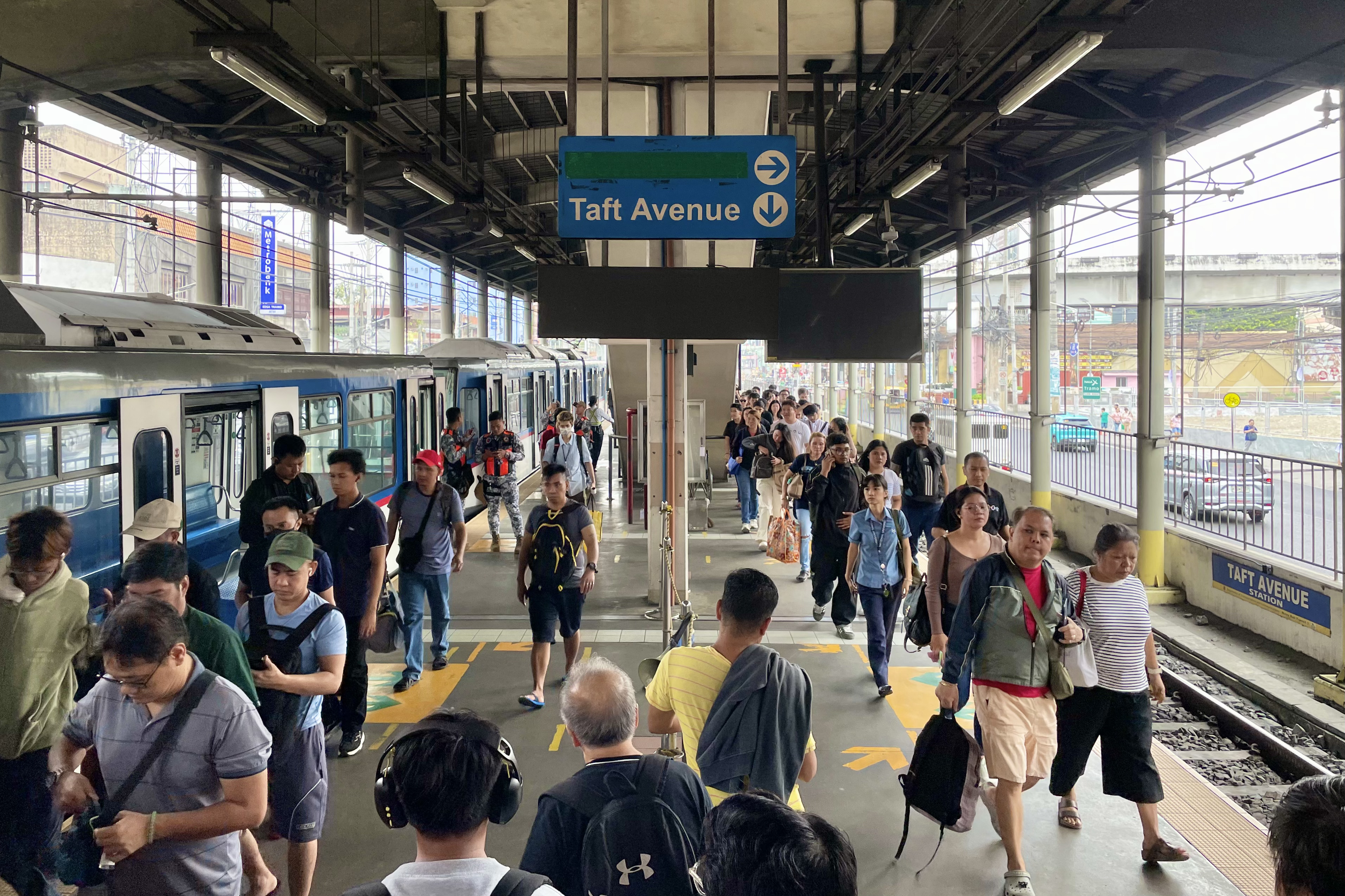
- Passengers alighting from an MRTC 3000 class train at Taft Avenue station, March 2026

General information
- Location: EDSA, San Roque; Pasay, Metro Manila; Philippines
- Owner: Department of Transportation
- Operator: Department of Transportation
- Line: MRT Line 3
- Platforms: 2 (1 island)
- Tracks: 2
- Connections: EDSA; E Taft Avenue; E Tramo

Construction
- Structure type: At-grade
- Accessible: Concourse: All entrances Platforms: All platforms

History
- Opened: July 20, 2000; 26 years ago

Services
Preceding station	Manila MRT	Following station
Magallanes towards North Avenue	MRT Line 3	Terminus

Out-of-system interchange
Preceding station	Manila LRT	Following station
Libertad towards Fernando Poe Jr.	LRT Line 1 transfer at EDSA	Baclaran towards Dr. Santos
Track layout
Location

Taft Avenue station is the southern terminus of the Metro Rail Transit Line 3 (MRT-3) system located in Pasay. It is situated at the intersection of Epifanio de los Santos Avenue (EDSA), one of Metro Manila's major thoroughfares, and Taft Avenue, usually referred to as Pasay Rotonda or EDSA-Taft. The station is named after Taft Avenue.

It is one of five stations on the line where passengers can catch a train going in the opposite direction without paying a new fare due to the station's layout. The other four stations are Araneta Center–Cubao, Shaw Boulevard, Boni, Buendia, and Ayala. Excluding Araneta Center–Cubao station, it is also one of four stations on the line with its concourse level located above the platform. However, crowd control measures at the station currently discourage passengers from switching trains at the platform level.

The station's location as a terminus has helped create many businesses in the area, from hotels and motels to restaurants and shops, with a good majority of them being a short walk from the station.

== History ==
=== Proposal ===
Taft Avenue station was first planned as part of the first phase of the EDSA Light Rail Transit III (EDSA LRT III) project, following a Build-Lease-Transfer (BLT) agreement between the Department of Transportation and Communications (DOTC) and EDSA LRT Corporation on September 22, 1992. However, the project faced delays due to government investigations into the contract, and construction was postponed until the Supreme Court of the Philippines upheld the contract's legality in 1995. Construction finally began on October 15, 1996 as the MRT III project, under a BLT contract awarded to the Metro Rail Transit Corporation (MRTC), led by a consortium of local companies.

==== Construction controversy ====
During the line's construction in 2000, Taft Avenue station was notorious among Pasay residents due to the station and the part of the line in Pasay being built completely at ground level. As a result, many intersections along EDSA were closed, forcing people along the streets in the area to make long detours just to cross EDSA.

In response, Metro Rail Transit Corporation (MRTC) stated that constructing the segment as an elevated railway was not feasible due to the Department of Public Works and Highways having already claimed the air rights above the line for the Tramo flyover project since 1996. Construction of the line continued amidst a cease and desist order issued by then-Pasay Mayor Wenceslao Trinidad and city councilors threatening to file graft charges against the MRTC.

=== Operation ===
MRT Line 3 became operational on December 15, 1999; however, it was then operational only between North Avenue and Buendia due to the inclusion of additional work orders by the Department of Transportation and Communications (DOTC) that included the Tramo flyover project. Taft Avenue station was opened on July 20, 2000, extending the line's operation southward to the station, which serves as its southern terminus. The station's link to Metro Point Mall was later added, as the mall was opened in December 2001.

On March 8, 2025, an escalator at the station malfunctioned, injuring ten passengers. The incident led to the dismissal of Oscar Bongon as general manager of the MRT-3 after Transportation Secretary Vince Dizon accused him of conducting a slow response in having the escalator repaired.

== Nearby landmarks ==
The station is connected to Metro Point Mall and Giselle Plaza. Winston Lodge and a branch of Hotel Sogo are two of the many motels found along EDSA near the station. The station is also the ideal stop for those continuing to Ninoy Aquino International Airport and Bay City including SM Mall of Asia, Heritage Hotel, San Juan de Dios Hospital and College, and Manila Tytana College (formerly Manila Doctors College).

== Transportation links ==
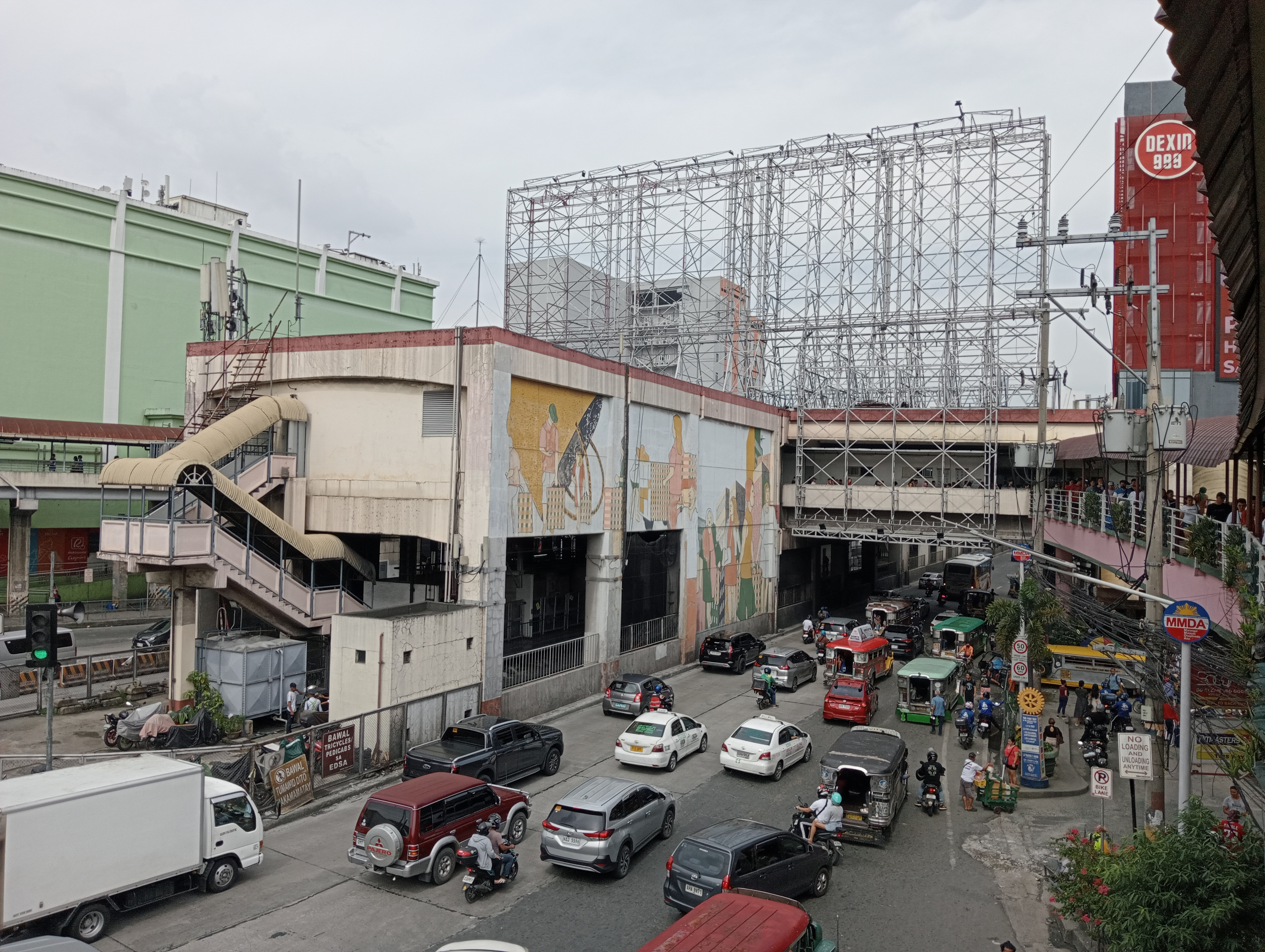
The station from the Taft Avenue Footbridge

Taft Avenue station is a major transportation hub. Many provincial bus lines, such as Victory Liner, Five Star Bus Company (serving Northern Luzon), Philtranco (serving Southern Luzon and the rest of the Philippines), and Genesis Transport (serving the provinces of Bataan and La Union), have bus terminals near the station. Buses and jeepneys from this station ply for various points in Metro Manila: Pasay, Muntinlupa (Sucat and Alabang), Parañaque (Bicutan and PITX), SM Mall of Asia, Taguig, Las Piñas, Manila, Caloocan, Makati, and Quezon City and the southern provinces of Cavite, Batangas, and Laguna. The nearby EDSA Carousel station of the same name is located along EDSA across Taft Avenue, as well as the southbound Tramo station just east of the MRT station.

Taft Avenue station serves as the transfer point for commuters riding the LRT Line 1 at EDSA station via an elevated walkway and via Metro Point Mall.

A shuttle bus connects the station to the Terminal 3 of Ninoy Aquino International Airport (NAIA).

== See also ==
- List of rail transit stations in Metro Manila
- Manila Metro Rail Transit System Line 3
