= Darwin Ramos =

Filipino Servant of God

Servant of God Darwin Ramos
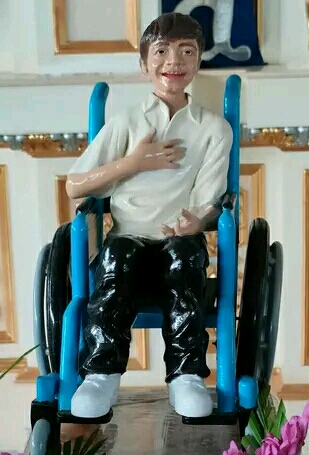
- Statue depiction of Darwin Ramos
- Born: December 17, 1994; Pasay, Metro Manila, Philippines
- Died: September 23, 2012 (aged 17); Philippine Children's Medical Center, Quezon City, Philippines
- Cause of death: Muscular dystrophy

Darwin Ramos (December 17, 1994 – September 23, 2012) was a Filipino street child and waste picker. His cause for beatification was opened in August 2019 in the Roman Catholic Diocese of Cubao in the Philippines. He is a Servant of God.

== Biography ==
=== 1994–2006: Family life and life on the streets ===
Darwin Ramos was born on December 17, 1994, in Doña Marta Maternity Hospital, in Pasay. Darwin spent his early years with his family along P. Villanueva St., Pasay. Their house was in a slum between EDSA and Libertad LRT stations. Darwin was the second child of nine children of a very poor family. His mother worked as a laundrywoman to earn some money to provide for her family while his father was an alcoholic. In order to help his family, Darwin became a waste picker in the street, with his sister Marimar who was two years younger. They spent their day going through garbage to recover plastic waste which they sold. The children did not go to school because of grave financial situation.

At 7 years old, he was diagnosed with Duchenne muscular dystrophy, a genetic disease characterized by muscle weakness. This began as weakness in the legs. Then, his mother noticed that Darwin was stumbling increasingly. Progressively, Darwin could no longer stand as his muscles weakened further.

Poverty pushed the family to live on the street. His father took advantage of Darwin's illness and he would position Darwin every morning at the Libertad station to beg from passers-by. Although he felt terrible shame, there was no other way to earn money to feed his family. His father frequently took a large portion of the money to buy alcohol. Darwin would not complain as long as a sufficient portion was left to feed his brothers and sisters.

In 2006, a group of street educators of the Tulay ng Kabataan Foundation ("A Bridge for Children Foundation"), came into contact with Darwin while he was panhandling at the Libertad station, and offered to take him in. Darwin agreed as he no longer could stand up straight.

=== 2006–2012: Life at the Tulay ng Kabataan Foundation ===
Darwin lived at the Our Lady of Guadalupe Center, a home for boys with special needs caused by different disabilities. He was baptized in the Roman Catholic church on 23 December 2006, at the EDSA Shrine. One year later, he received first communion and the sacrament of confirmation from the Auxiliary bishop of Manila, Broderick Pabillo.

Darwin increasingly suffered more respiratory distress that required consecutive hospitalizations. He never complained and always smiled even during most difficult times. He had the habit of offering his sufferings. When he was speaking of his own illness, he did not talk about his myopathy but of what he called as being his "mission". One day, he said to the priest of the Foundation: "You know Father, I think Jesus wants me to hold on until the end, just like he did".

Darwin developed a deep personal relationship with Christ; not a day passed that the young boy did not take time out to entrust himself to him. A caregiver from the foundation testified: "One day, when Darwin was feverish, he insisted to be helped in getting out of bed to join the others in the center so that he could lead the evening prayer. It was Jesus before anything else."

=== September 2012: Darwin's final week ===
On Sunday, September 16, 2012, the nurse of the foundation decided to bring Darwin to the Philippine Children's Medical Center (PCMC) in Quezon City because he had difficulty breathing. When the priest in charge of the Tulay ng Kabataan Foundation arrived at his bedside, the first thing that Darwin did was to excuse himself for causing the priest worries. Darwin added as he breathed laboriously: "Thank you for everything Father".

On Monday, September 17, Darwin was intubated and was no longer able to talk. He was able to write in a notebook. Darwin then received the anointing of the sick. On Friday, September 21, he looked peaceful and had a big smile. He wrote his two last sentences in a notebook: "A huge thank you" and "I am very happy" as a sign of a battle won. On Saturday, Darwin entered into a great silence while remaining conscious. He died on Sunday, September 23, 2012, at sunrise, at the PCMC in Quezon City. The funeral mass was celebrated in a full church, attended by all the children of the Tulay ng Kabataan Foundation. Darwin was buried at the Pasay City Public Cemetery.

== Legacy ==
In the Philippines, the memory of Darwin's life remains in the minds of many. People continue to gather at his tomb in Pasay City Cemetery. In 2016, Daniel-Ange de Maupeou d'Ableiges wrote a book entitled Prophètes de la Beauté ("Prophets of beauty") with the initial pages dedicated to the life of Darwin Ramos. Many readers were touched by his example of joy and love through disease and suffering, throughout his adolescence, and the countless testimonies of the graces received through his intercession: "In spite of the disease, it is his joy of living and his luminous glance that will have touched more than one. Darwin has left the image of a young boy edifying with holiness, who despite his young age, quickly realized that his illness, much more than an irreversible ordeal, was none the less a mission ... A mission guided by the one he loved so much to call his friend: Jesus."

== Beatification process ==
In March 2018, Honesto Ongtioco, Bishop of the Roman Catholic Diocese of Cubao, opened the cause for beatification of Darwin Ramos. The Darwin Ramos Association on March 14, 2018, assigned the Thomas de Gabory OP as postulator.

After having obtained the nihil obstat (on March 29, 2019) of the Congregation for the Causes of Saints in Rome, and after the consultation of the faithful by the publication of the edict during 2 months, the cause was officially open in public on August 28, 2019, at the Immaculate Conception cathedral of Cubao by Bishop Ongtioco. An ecclesiastical tribunal was assigned to hear witnesses.

== Prayer for beatification ==
The prayer for canonisation got the imprimatur (ecclesiastical approval) of Honesto Ongtioco, Bishop of Cubao, on November 22, 2018: "O God of all Joy, Father, Son, and Holy Spirit, you never leave alone those who are in a time of trial. We thank you for giving us, in Darwin Ramos, a street child, an illuminating example of Christian life. During his short life you gave him the grace of simple never-failing faith, of joyful hope in illness, of endless charitable concern for his neighbor. We pray you grant your servant Darwin glorification on earth so that young and sick people may find in him a master of Joy. Through his intercession, hear our prayer, (express it here). We ask this, through Jesus Christ, our Lord, Amen."

== See also ==
- List of Filipinos venerated in the Catholic Church

== Bibliography ==
- Fr. Matthieu Dauchez, DARWIN RAMOS - Master of Joy, Manila (Philippines), St Pauls, 2022, 110 p. (ISBN 978-971-004-548-8)
- Matthieu Dauchez, Plus fort que les ténèbres, Paris (France), Éditions Artège, 2015, 168 p. (ISBN 9782360403363)
- Daniel-Ange de Maupeou d'Ableiges, Prophètes de la Beauté, Montrouge (France), Éditions du Jubilé, 2016, 236 p. (ISBN 9782866795658), pp. 25–38.
- Ma figure spirituelle, Darwin Ramos, in La Vie, 2015
- Alexandra Chapeleau, La mission de Darwin Ramos: "Plus fort que les ténèbres" | ZENIT - Français, on fr.zenith.org, 20 mars 2015.
