= EDSA station =

EDSA station may refer to the following stations in the Philippines:

- EDSA station (LRT), an LRT Line 1 station in Pasay
- EDSA station (PNR), a PNR/NSCR station in Makati
