= Gil Puyat station =

Train station in Pasay, Philippines

Coordinates: 14°33′14.86″N 120°59′49.84″E

Gil Puyat	GL18
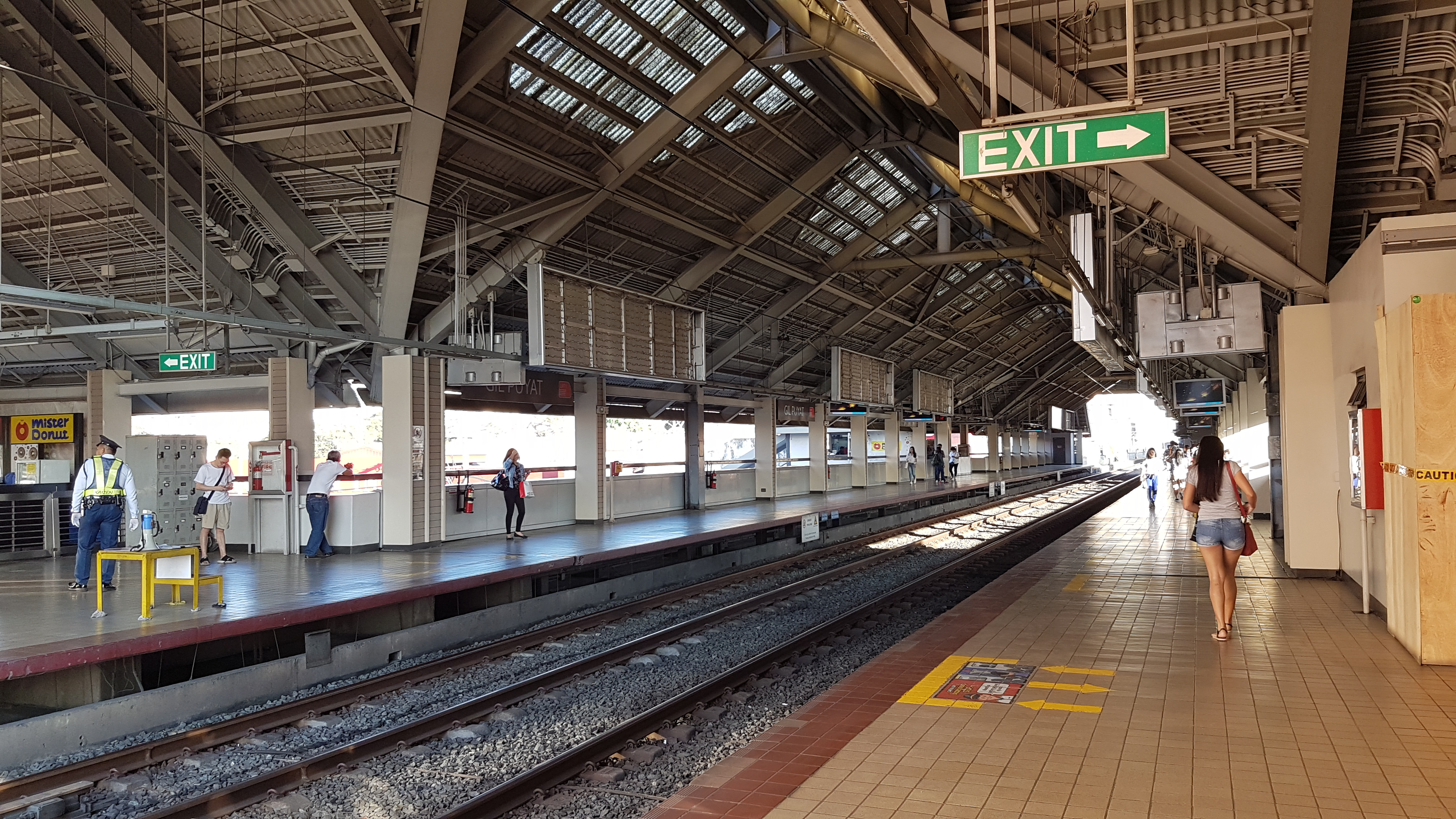

General information
- Other names: Buendia
- Location: Taft Avenue, San Isidro / San Lorenzo; Pasay / Makati, Metro Manila, Philippines
- Owner: Department of Transportation – Light Rail Transit Authority
- Operator: Light Rail Manila Corporation
- Line: LRT Line 1
- Platforms: 2 (2 side)
- Tracks: 2

Construction
- Structure type: Elevated

History
- Opened: December 1, 1984; 41 years ago

Services
Preceding station	Manila LRT	Following station
Vito Cruz towards Fernando Poe Jr.	LRT Line 1	Libertad towards Dr. Santos
Track layout
Location
- Location within Metro Manila Location within Luzon Location within Philippines

Gil Puyat station, also colloquially known as Buendia station, is an elevated Light Rail Transit (LRT) station located on the LRT Line 1 (LRT-1) system in Pasay, Philippines. It is situated above the intersection of Taft Avenue and Gil Puyat Avenue, where the station derived its name. The avenue itself is named after Gil Puyat, a former senator and statesman. The station was opened to the public on December 1, 1984, as part of the line's inaugural southern section, known as the Taft Line.

Gil Puyat station is the ninth station for trains headed to Fernando Poe Jr., the seventeenth station for trains headed to Dr. Santos, and is one of the four Line 1 stations serving Pasay, the others are Libertad, EDSA and Baclaran.

The station is a major transfer point for passengers bound for the Makati Central Business District.

== Transportation and building links ==
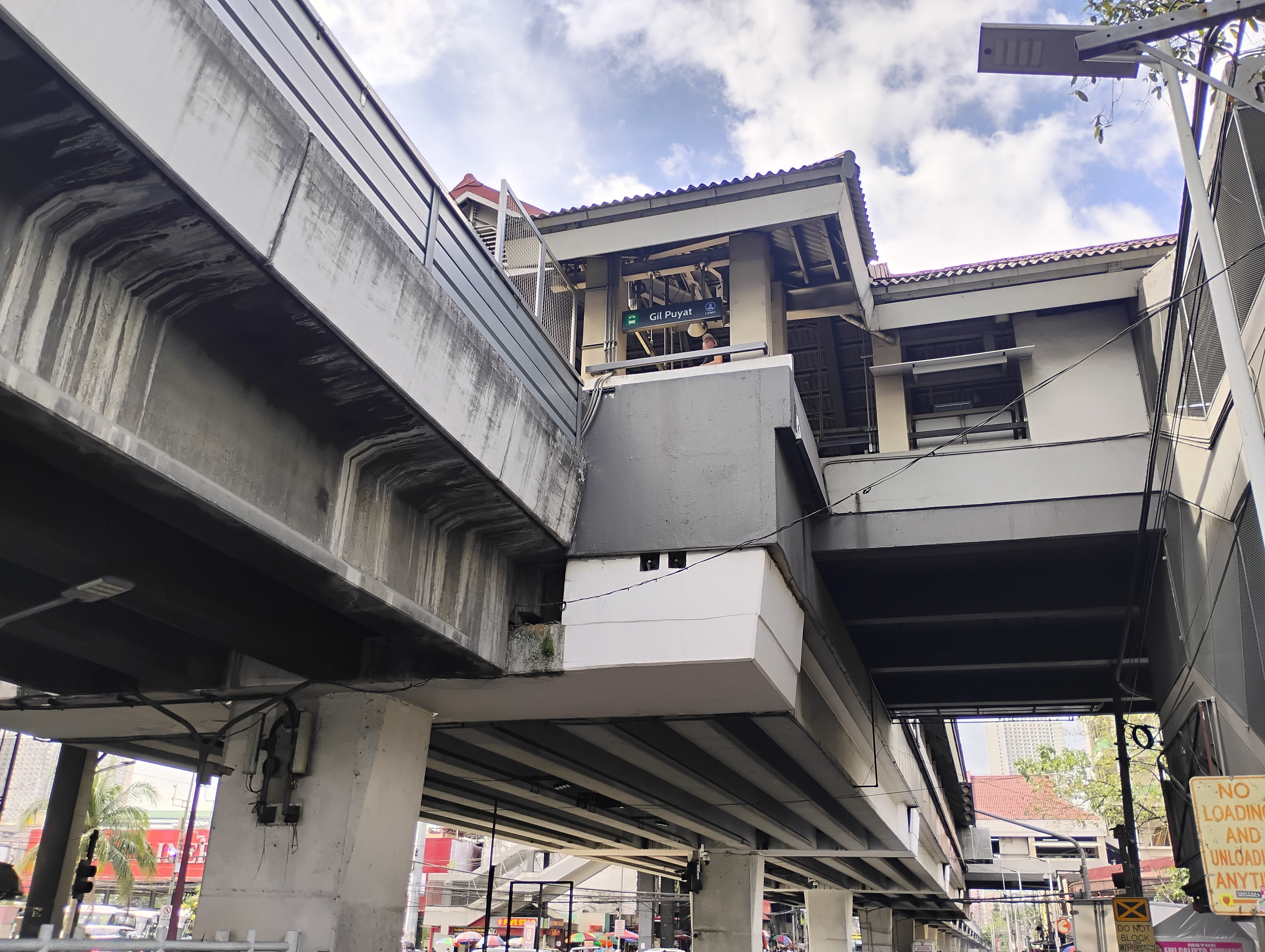
Gil Puyat station as seen from street level

Bus terminal for both city and provincial buses lie beside the station. Buses that ply the Buendia (Gil Puyat) route stop there, as well as buses to Batangas, Laguna, Quezon, and Marinduque. Buses that ply the Taft Avenue route also stop near the station.

Taxis, jeepneys, and tricycles also stop near the station, serving commuters that live farther away from the station.

A terminal for UV Express vans bound for SM City Fairview also lies beside the station's east entrance.

The station's west platform is directly linked to the JAC Liner Terminal and Taft Centrale Mall, respectively.

Since 2024, a BGC Bus route was launched between the station, One Ayala, and the McKinley Exchange Corporate Center, serving as an indirect link between the LRT-1 and Bonifacio Global City.

== See also ==
- List of rail transit stations in Metro Manila
- Manila Light Rail Transit System
