= Baclaran station =

Train station in Pasay, Philippines

Coordinates: 14°32′19.77″N 121°00′02.46″E

Baclaran	GL21
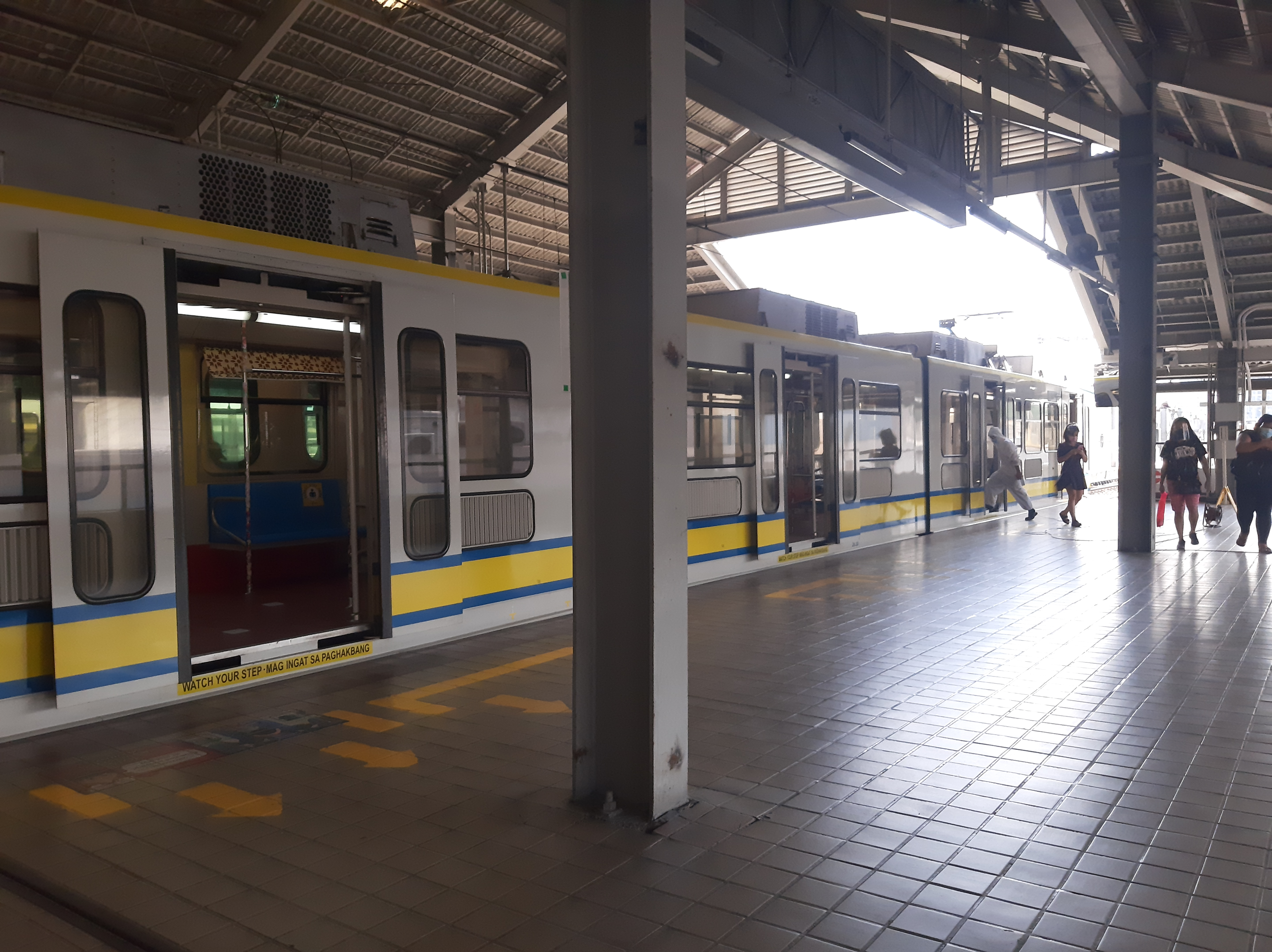

General information
- Location: Taft Avenue Extension, Santo Niño; Pasay, Metro Manila, Philippines
- Owner: Department of Transportation – Light Rail Transit Authority
- Operator: Light Rail Manila Corporation
- Line: LRT Line 1
- Platforms: 3 (1 side, 1 island)
- Tracks: 3

Construction
- Structure type: Elevated

History
- Opened: December 1, 1984; 41 years ago
- Former names: South Terminal (c. 1985)

Services
Preceding station	Manila LRT	Following station
EDSA towards Fernando Poe Jr.	LRT Line 1	Redemptorist–Aseana towards Dr. Santos
Track layout
Location
- Location within Metro Manila Location within Luzon Location within Philippines

Baclaran station is an elevated Light Rail Transit (LRT) station located on the LRT Line 1 (LRT-1) system in Pasay. Situated on the last stretches of Taft Avenue right at the border with Baclaran, Parañaque. The station is named after the famous shopping district of the same name, which is located on the borders of the cities of Pasay and Parañaque. Opened in 1984, the station served as the line's initial southern terminus, historically known as South Terminal, until Phase 1 of the Cavite Extension was opened in 2024.

The station is the sixth station for trains headed to Fernando Poe Jr. and the twentieth station for trains headed to Dr. Santos. Baclaran is one of the four LRT-1 stations serving Pasay; the others are Gil Puyat, Libertad, and EDSA. The line's depot is located near the station.

The terminal is near one of the country's most famous landmarks, the National Shrine of Our Mother of Perpetual Help, widely known as the Baclaran Church. It is also near numerous dry goods and flea markets (tiangges), selling everything from clothes and electronics to home decorations and traditional medicine. It is also interconnected to adjacent shopping malls such as MyMall and Baclaran LRT Shopping Mall.

== Transportation links ==
Baclaran station is a major transportation hub, with many buses and jeepneys terminating here. Buses coming from the terminal usually head to points south of Manila and the province of Cavite. Jeepneys that stop here usually go to various destinations in Metro Manila (Las Piñas, Parañaque, and Muntinlupa to the south; Manila, Pasay, Quezon City, and Caloocan to the north) and the province of Cavite. Taxis also ply for hire near the station, with dedicated taxis available for passengers heading to Ninoy Aquino International Airport, which is only about 2 kilometers (1.2 mi) from the station. Cycle rickshaws (pedicabs) and tricycles can also be used to navigate the interior streets of Baclaran and Santo Niño in Pasay from the station.

== Incidents ==
- January 3, 2008: A fire blazed at a shopping mall in Baclaran around 5 a.m. PST. Windy weather fanned the flames and brought smoke to the Baclaran terminal up to the next station at EDSA.
- August 11, 2008: A fire blazed in Baclaran Terminal Plaza Mall near the station. This was resumed on August 13.
- April 13, 2023: A malfunction occurred at the station, causing LRT Line 1 to go on limited operations from Gil Puyat to Roosevelt beginning at 1:40 p.m PST.

== Gallery ==
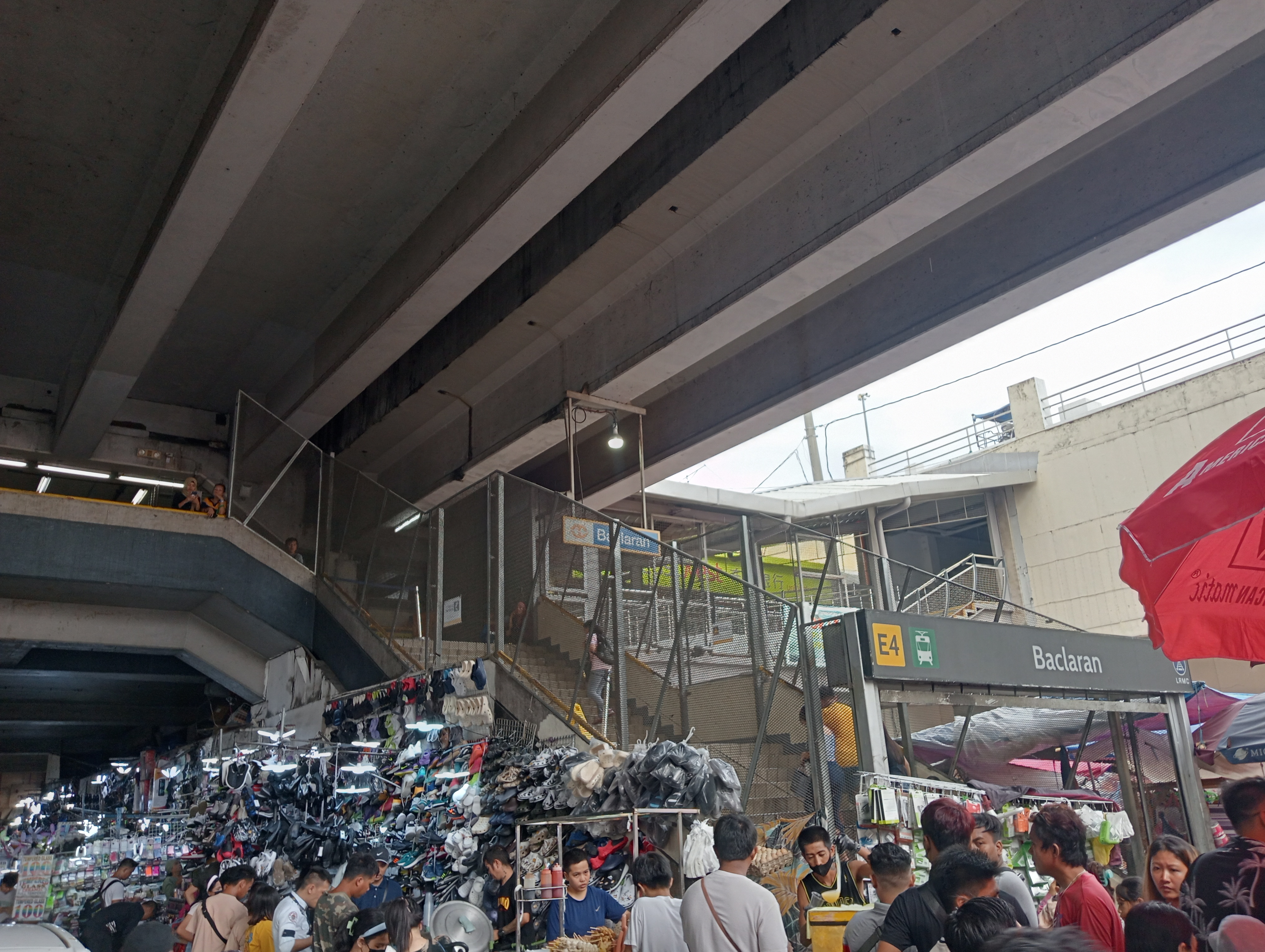
Entrance

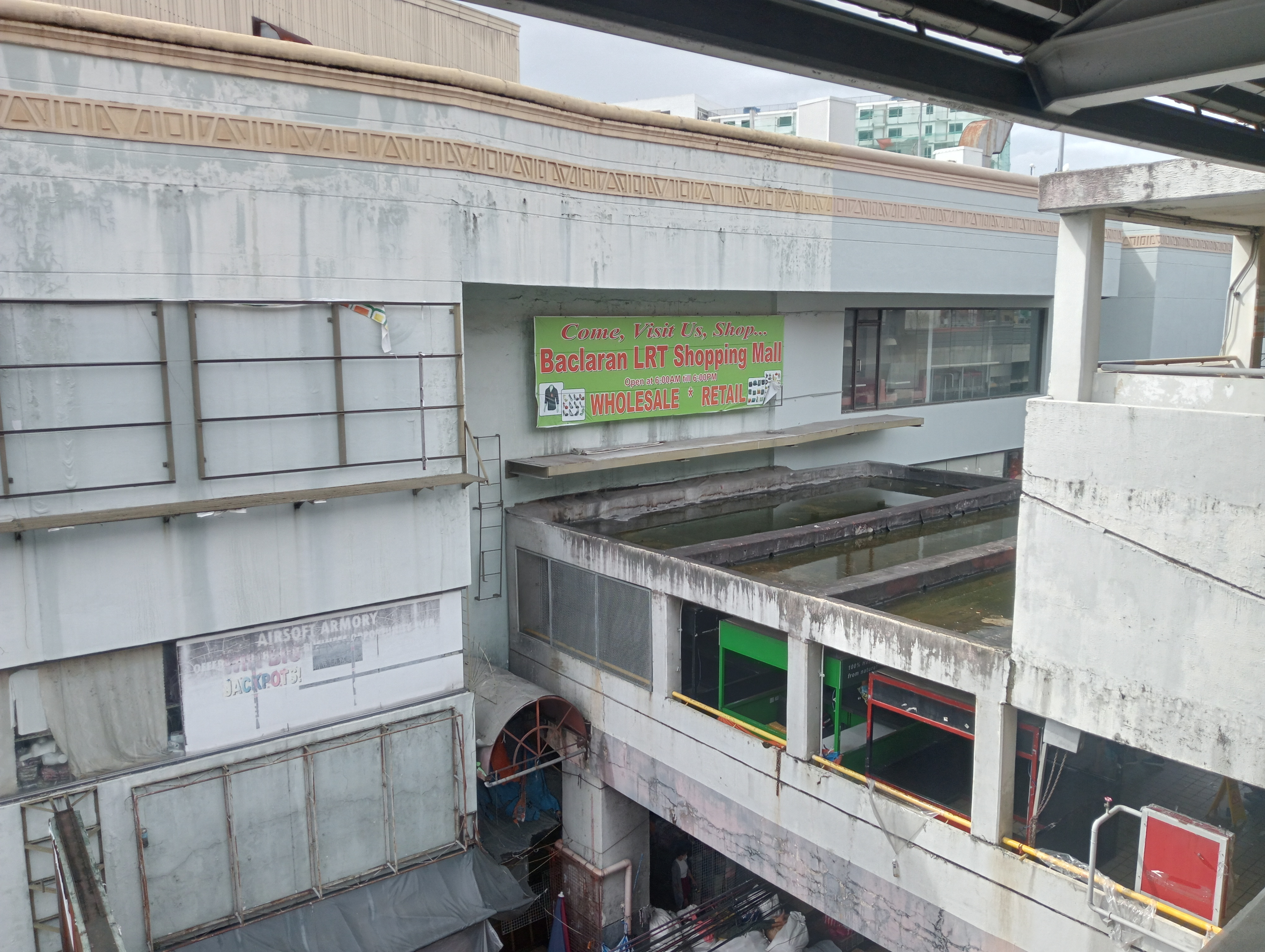
Station's link with Baclaran LRT Shopping Mall

== See also ==
- List of rail transit stations in Metro Manila
- Manila Light Rail Transit System
