= Arnaiz Avenue =

Collector road in Metro Manila, Philippines

Coordinates: 14°33′1″N 121°0′28″E

Antonio Arnáiz Avenue
- Pásay Road; Libertad Street
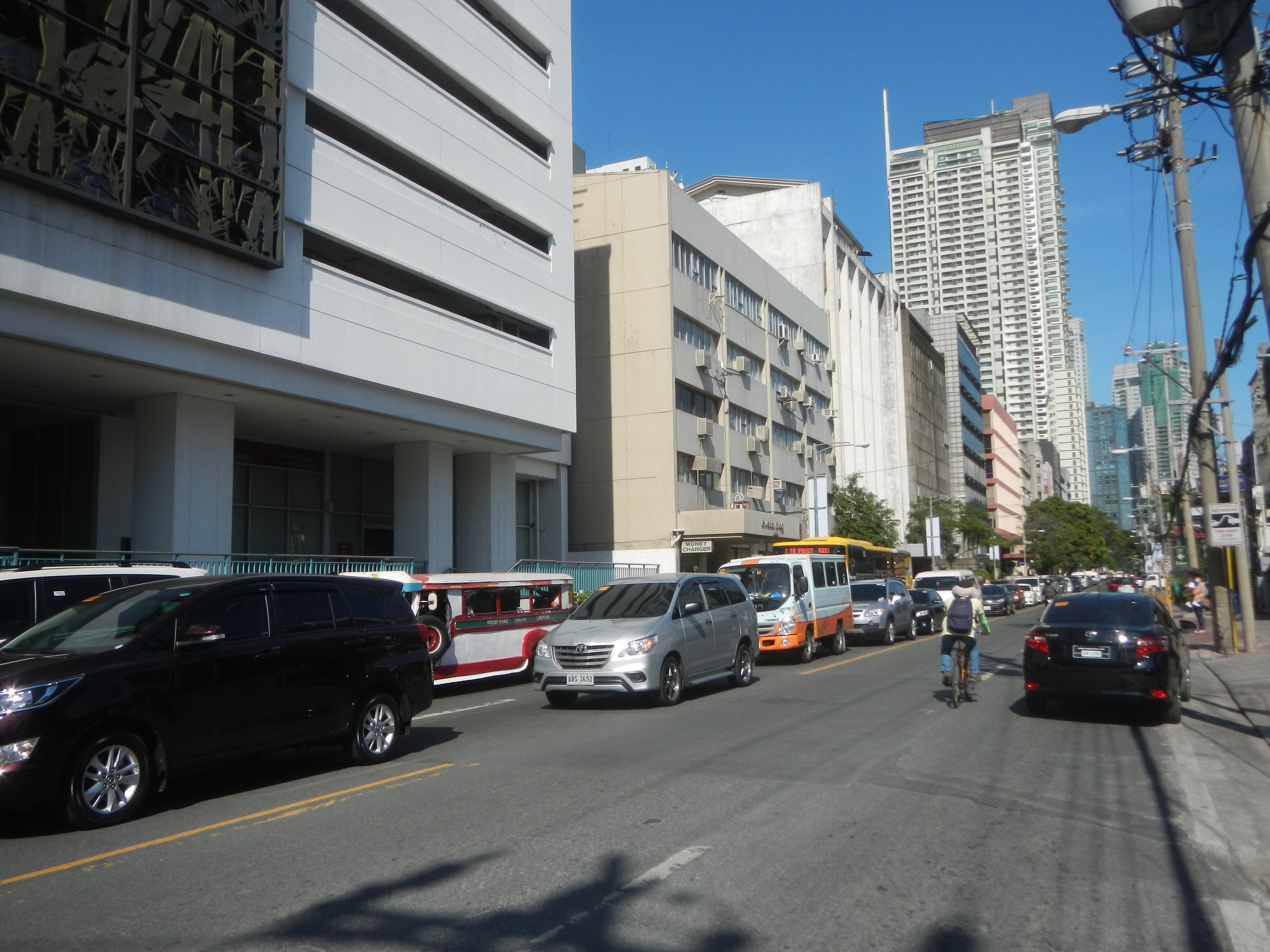
- Arnáiz Avenue east of Amorsolo Street in the Makati CBD
- Interactive map of Antonio Arnáiz Avenue
- Native name: Avenida Antonio Arnáiz (Spanish)
- Former names: Pasay–McKinley Road; Pasay–Sakura Heiyei Road
- Type: Tertiary road
- Maintained by: Department of Public Works and Highways
- Length: 4.039 km (2.510 mi)
- West end: AH 26 (N120) (Roxas Boulevard) in Pasay
- Major junctions: N170 (Taft Avenue); N145 (Osmeña Highway)
- East end: AH 26 (N1) (Epifanio de los Santos Avenue) in Makati

Antonio Arnáiz Avenue, also known simply as Avenida Arnáiz and by its former official name Pásay Road, is a major east–west collector road linking Makati and Pasay in the Philippines. It stretches across western Metro Manila from Roxas Boulevard in Pasay to Epifanio de los Santos Avenue (EDSA/C-4) in Makati.

The Osmeña Highway splits Arnaiz Avenue into two sections. The western section, found mostly in Pasay, is a congested and highly pedestrianized road that used to be known as Calle Libertad. This section passes through some of the most important Pasay landmarks, such as the Cuneta Astrodome, Cartimar shopping district and Santa Clara de Montefalco Parish. Also located within the vicinity are the Department of Foreign Affairs building, old Pasay City Hall, Pasay City Sports Complex, and Pasay Cemetery.

East of Osmeña Highway, the avenue enters the Makati Central Business District, where it merges with traffic from a Skyway ramp near the Amorsolo Street junction. It continues across Legazpi and San Lorenzo villages of the Makati CBD, which contains several office towers and condominiums such as Cityland Pasong Tamo Tower and Avida Towers, The Beacon, several Japanese restaurants, Walter Mart Makati, Don Bosco Technical Institute, and the Ayala Center. This section of the road in Makati used to be known as Pasay Road. Its eastern terminus is at its junction with EDSA near Dusit Thani Hotel.

The western section is served by the Libertad LRT station along Taft Avenue, while the eastern section is served by the Pasay Road railway station along Osmeña Highway and the Ayala MRT station along EDSA. A small 1.6-kilometer (0.99 mi) long portion of a continuation of the road in Dasmariñas Village, Makati is also called Pasay Road from EDSA to Tamarind Road.

== Route description ==
The avenue is divided into two portions, one used to be named Libertad Street and the other was named Pasay Road.

=== Libertad Street ===
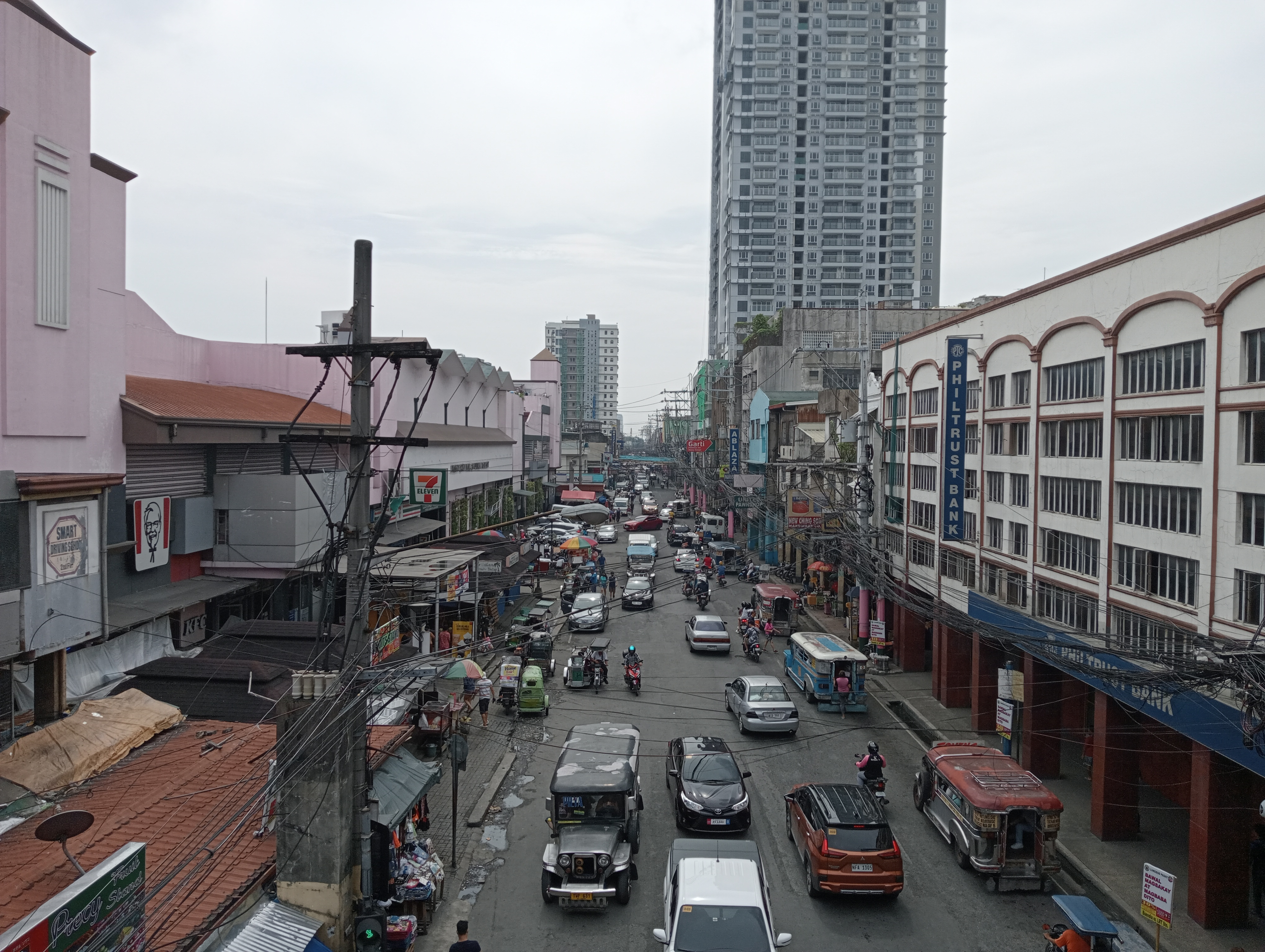
Arnaiz Avenue looking west from Libertad station in Pasay

Arnaiz Avenue starts at an intersection with Roxas Boulevard northbound near Cuneta Astrodome. It then crosses F.B. Harrison Street and Taft Avenue near the Pasay Public Market and Mall and the Libertad LRT station. At this portion, the road is heavily pedestrianized, and traffic queues are common. It then crosses P. Zamora and P. Burgos Streets near St. Mary's Academy - Pasay and Tramo Street and crosses Estero de Tripa de Gallina (Tripa de Gallina Creek) at the Cementina Dolores Bridge on the Pasay–Makati boundary. It soon ends at a traffic light intersection with Osmeña Highway in Pio del Pilar, near the Pasay Road PNR station.

=== Pasay Road ===
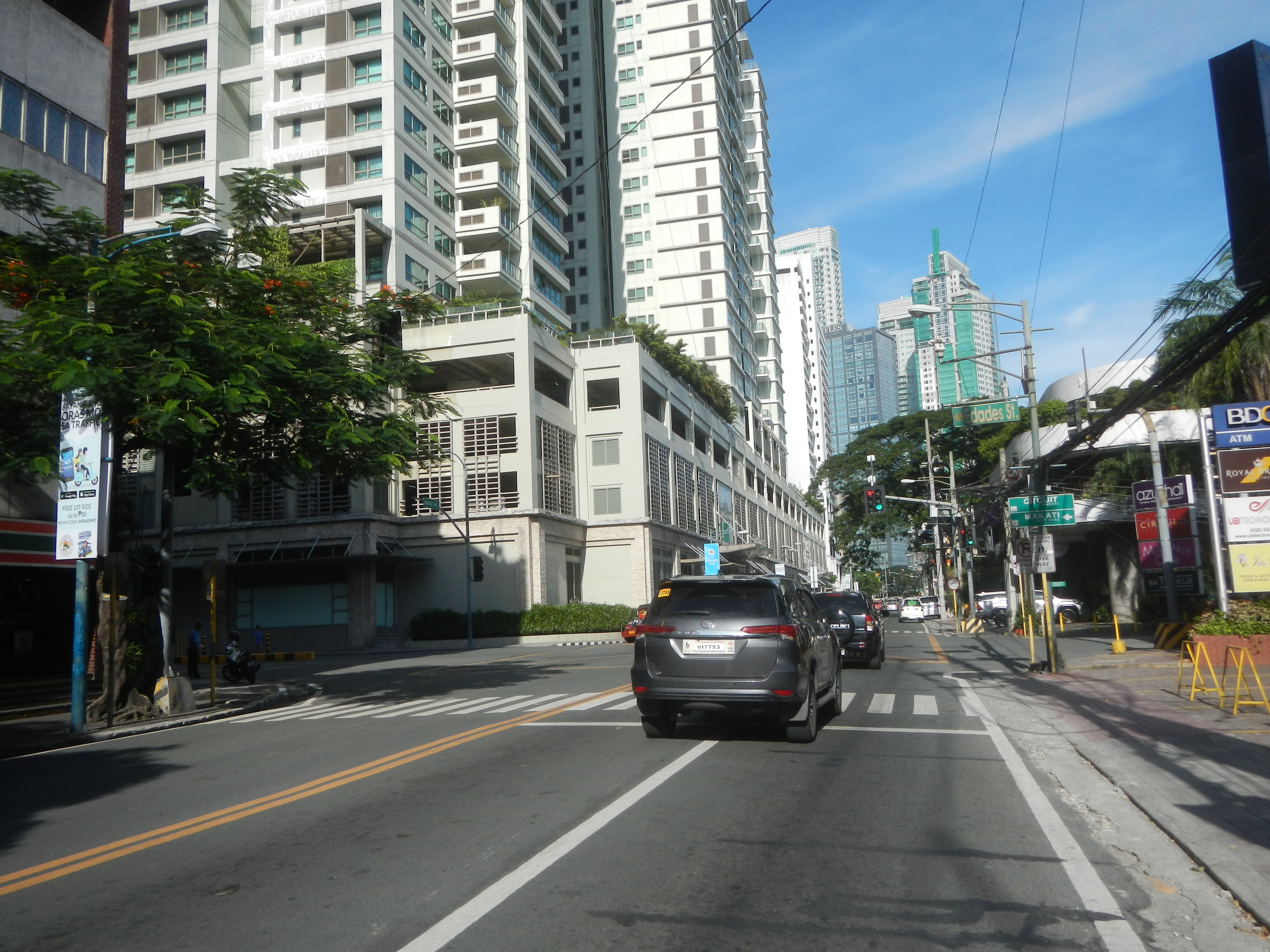
Arnaiz Avenue at the intersection of Paseo de Roxas in San Lorenzo, Makati

After crossing Osmeña Highway, it becomes a one-way street carrying westbound traffic until it crosses Chino Roces Avenue near Walter Mart Makati. The Skyway exit to Amorsolo Street stands above the avenue until it curves downward toward Amorsolo Street, while its entry ramp towards Skyway southbound is situated on the avenue to accommodate westbound traffic only. Past Amorsolo Street, it crosses Paseo de Roxas near Greenbelt and Makati Avenue near Glorietta until it ends at a traffic light intersection with EDSA. The avenue is lined with hotels, namely New World Makati, Fairmont Makati, and Crown Regency between Paseo de Roxas and EDSA.

== History ==
The present avenue originated from two discontinuous roads: Calle Libertad, a short street from the old Manila Bay coastline to Calle P. Burgos (now Burgos Street) in Pasay (Pasai), and a provincial road from P. Burgos to Barrio Culi-Culi (now Barangay Pio del Pilar) in San Pedro de Macati (now Makati). The latter became part of the Pasai–San Pedro Macati Road, which connected the municipal centers of Pasay and San Pedro de Macati. The road was occupied by the American troops on February 5, 1899, during the Philippine–American War. Libertad was later extended westward to Dewey Boulevard (now Roxas Boulevard), which was constructed on reclaimed land.

Both roads were later integrated and extended eastward up to Fort McKinley, making it known as Pasay–McKinley Road, Pasay–Sakura Heiyei Road (during World War II), and other names recognized by the government per section. It was also designated as Route 57 or Highway 57. The road became disconnected in the 1950s when the Makati Commercial Center complex (present-day Ayala Center) was built over its segment between Highway 54 (now EDSA) and Makati Avenue, thus realigning it south of the new commercial center, approaching Dasmariñas Village. The disconnected segment towards Fort McKinley became a separate road known as McKinley Road. It was renamed in 1984 to Antonio S. Arnaiz Avenue, under Batas Pambansa Blg. 783.

== Intersections ==
Intersections are numbered by kilometer post, with Rizal Park in Manila designated as kilometer zero.

Province	City/Municipality	km	mi	Destinations	Notes
Pasay		4.191	2.604	AH 26 (N120) (Roxas Boulevard)	Western terminus
Pasay				Harrison Avenue	Traffic light intersection
Pasay				Leveriza Street	One-way entry to Arnaiz Avenue
Pasay				Park Avenue	
Pasay				P. Villanueva Street	
Pasay				N170 (Taft Avenue)	Traffic light intersection
Pasay				M. Colayco Street / Decena Street	
Pasay		6.072	3.773	P. Zamora Street / P. Burgos Street	Traffic light intersection; one-way street northbound
Pasay				Cementina Street	One-way exit
Pasay		7	4.3	Tramo Street	
Pasay – Makati boundary		7.998	4.970	Cementina Dolores Bridge	
Makati		6.133	3.811	Marconi Street	Western terminus
Makati				Edison Street	
Makati				Batangas Street	
Makati				Capt. M. Reyes Street	One-way exit
Makati				Evangelista Street	One-way entrance
Makati				N145 (Osmeña Highway)	Traffic light intersection; no entry to Arnaiz Avenue eastbound
Makati				Medina Street / Estacion Street	Access to Pasay Road station
Makati				Chino Roces Avenue	Arnaiz Avenue towards Osmeña Highway becomes one-way westbound while its segment from the latter to Amorsolo Street is one-way eastbound.
Makati				AH 26 (E2) (Skyway) – Alabang	Skyway's Amorsolo on-ramp; westbound exit only
Makati				Amorsolo Street	Traffic light intersection
Makati				Paseo de Roxas / Edades Street	Traffic light intersection
Makati				Makati Avenue / San Lorenzo Drive	Traffic light intersection
Makati		8.099	5.032	AH 26 (N1) (EDSA)	Eastern terminus; continues east into Dasmariñas Village as Pasay Road
1.000 mi = 1.609 km; 1.000 km = 0.621 mi: Incomplete access

== Landmarks ==
From west to east:

- Pasay City Market
- Pasay City Cockpit
- Pasay City Cemetery
- Pio del Pilar Elementary School
- San Ildefonso Parish Church
- Walter Mart Makati
- Don Bosco Technical Institute of Makati
- San Lorenzo Village
- Greenbelt Mall
- New World Makati
- Fairmont Makati
- Glorietta
- Park Square
- Dusit Thani Manila
