= EDSA station (LRT) =

Train station in Pasay, Philippines

Coordinates: 14°32′19.77″N 121°00′02.46″E

EDSA	GL20
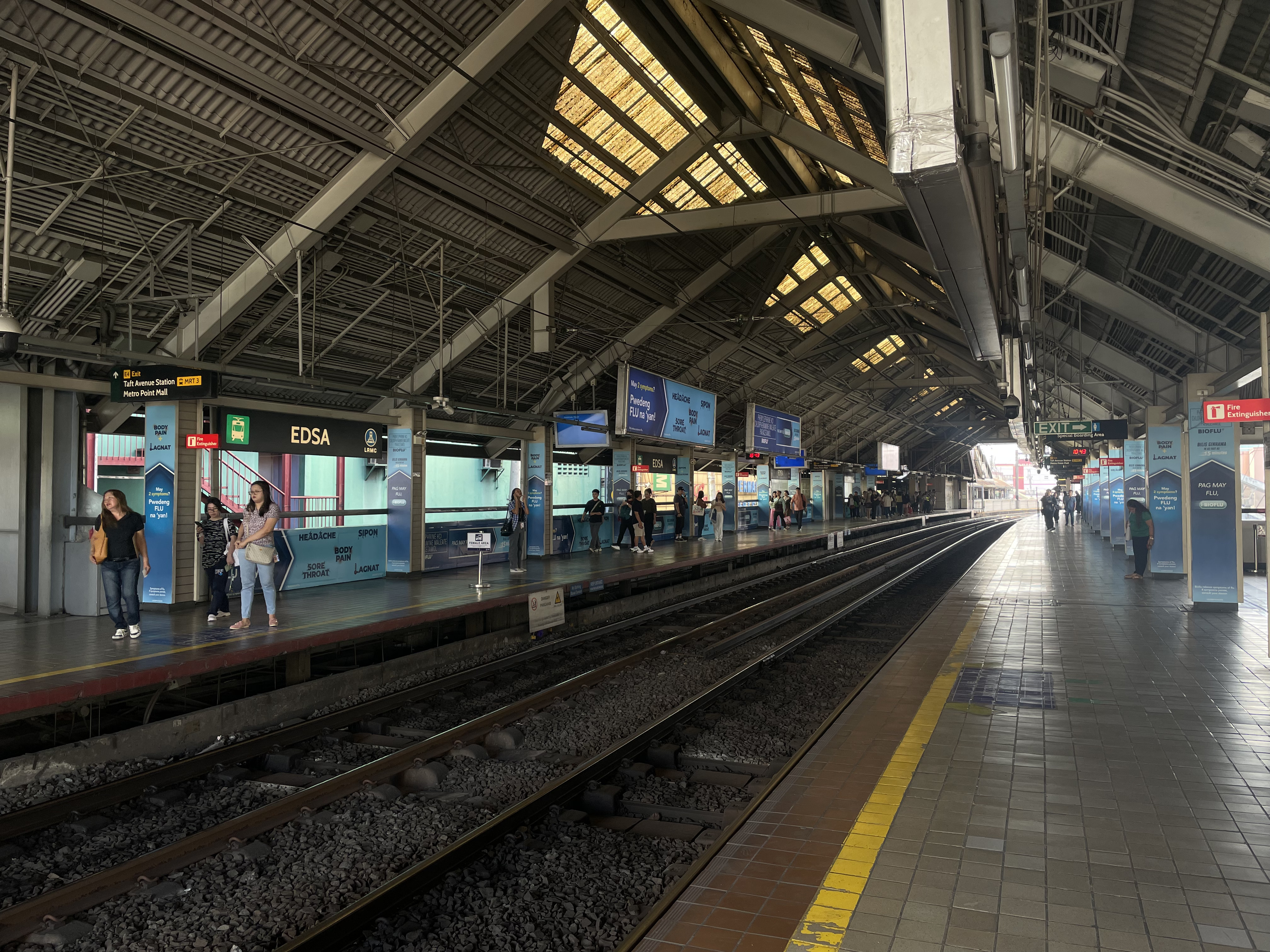

General information
- Location: 2802 Taft Avenue, San Rafael; Pasay, Metro Manila, Philippines
- Owner: Department of Transportation – Light Rail Transit Authority
- Operator: Light Rail Manila Corporation
- Line: LRT Line 1
- Platforms: 2 (2 side)
- Tracks: 2
- Connections: Taft Avenue; E Taft Avenue

Construction
- Structure type: Elevated
- Parking: Yes (Metro Point Mall)
- Accessible: Yes

History
- Opened: December 1, 1984; 41 years ago

Services
Preceding station	Manila LRT	Following station
Libertad towards Fernando Poe Jr.	LRT Line 1	Baclaran towards Dr. Santos

Out-of-system interchange
Preceding station	Manila MRT	Following station
Magallanes towards North Avenue	MRT Line 3 transfer at Taft Avenue	Terminus
Track layout
Location
- Location within Metro Manila Location within Luzon Location within Philippines

EDSA station is an elevated Light Rail Transit (LRT) station located on the LRT Line 1 (LRT-1) system in Pasay. The station is situated on the intersection of Taft Avenue and Epifanio de los Santos Avenue, better known as EDSA, one of Metro Manila's major thoroughfares. The station and the avenue are both named after Epifanio de los Santos, a noted historian.

The station is the seventh station for trains headed to Fernando Poe Jr., the nineteenth station for trains headed to Dr. Santos, and is one of the four LRT-1 stations serving Pasay; the others are Gil Puyat, Libertad and Baclaran.

== History ==
EDSA station was constructed as part of the original alignment of Metrorail (present-day LRT-1), beginning in September 1981, after an economic recession delayed the project’s initial timeline. It formed part of the line's first constructed segment along Taft Avenue between EDSA and Libertad in Pasay.

The station was opened to the public on December 1, 1984, as part of the line’s initial southern section, known as the Taft Line, which was the first segment to become operational. It existed long before the LRT-1 was extended northward along EDSA through Caloocan and Quezon City, adding two stations there as part of the North Extension, which opened in 2010. The station's link to Metro Point Mall was later added, as the mall was opened in December 2001.

=== Expansion ===
In 2019, EDSA station underwent expansion works to widen its capacity, from 70 square meters (750 sq ft) to 400 square meters (4,300 sq ft) as the station caters more than 52,000 passengers daily. It began on June 26. Initially expected to be finished in 2022, the upgrade was finished earlier than expected on October 21, 2019, in anticipation for the Cavite Extension Project. The project consists of the expansion of the structure through the third floor of the adjacent Liana's Supermarket & Department Store and constructing a bridge to connect nearby areas.

The expansion also features a new roofing system, a widened floor area by dismantling the old ticket booths, an increased floor-to-ceiling height in other areas of the station, and the construction of a new fire exit for the southeast leg of the station. The expansion also features new comfort rooms, a wheelchair ramp, LED lighting setups, interior paint jobs, and floor finishes.

== Nearby landmarks ==
The station is connected to Metro Point Mall, which also provides access to the Taft Avenue station of MRT Line 3. Saver's Square, Winston Lodge, and a branch of Hotel Sogo are also found near the station. It is also accessible via the adjacent Pilapil Street.

== Transportation links ==
EDSA station is served by an abundance of buses, jeepneys, and taxis on both EDSA and Taft Avenue routes, with stops near the station. EDSA Carousel's Taft Avenue station, located along EDSA, is accessible from the station through a pedestrian overpass adjoining the southbound platform. Many provincial bus lines, such as Victory Liner (serving Northern Luzon) and Philtranco (serving Southern Luzon and the rest of the Philippines), have bus terminals near the station. Buses and jeepneys from this station ply for various points in Metro Manila, like Pasay (including SM Mall of Asia), Muntinlupa (Sucat and Alabang), Taguig, Parañaque (Bicutan), Las Piñas, City of Manila, Quezon City, Caloocan, and Makati, and the southern provinces of Cavite, Batangas, and Laguna.

The station is also the transfer point for commuters riding on MRT Line 3. The station is connected to MRT-3's Taft Avenue station by an elevated walkway around the exterior of the Metro Point Mall, with two entrances to the mall itself.

== See also ==
- List of rail transit stations in Metro Manila
- Manila Light Rail Transit System
