= Libertad station =

Train station in Pasay, Philippines

Coordinates: 14°32′52.02″N 120°59′55.07″E

Libertad	GL19
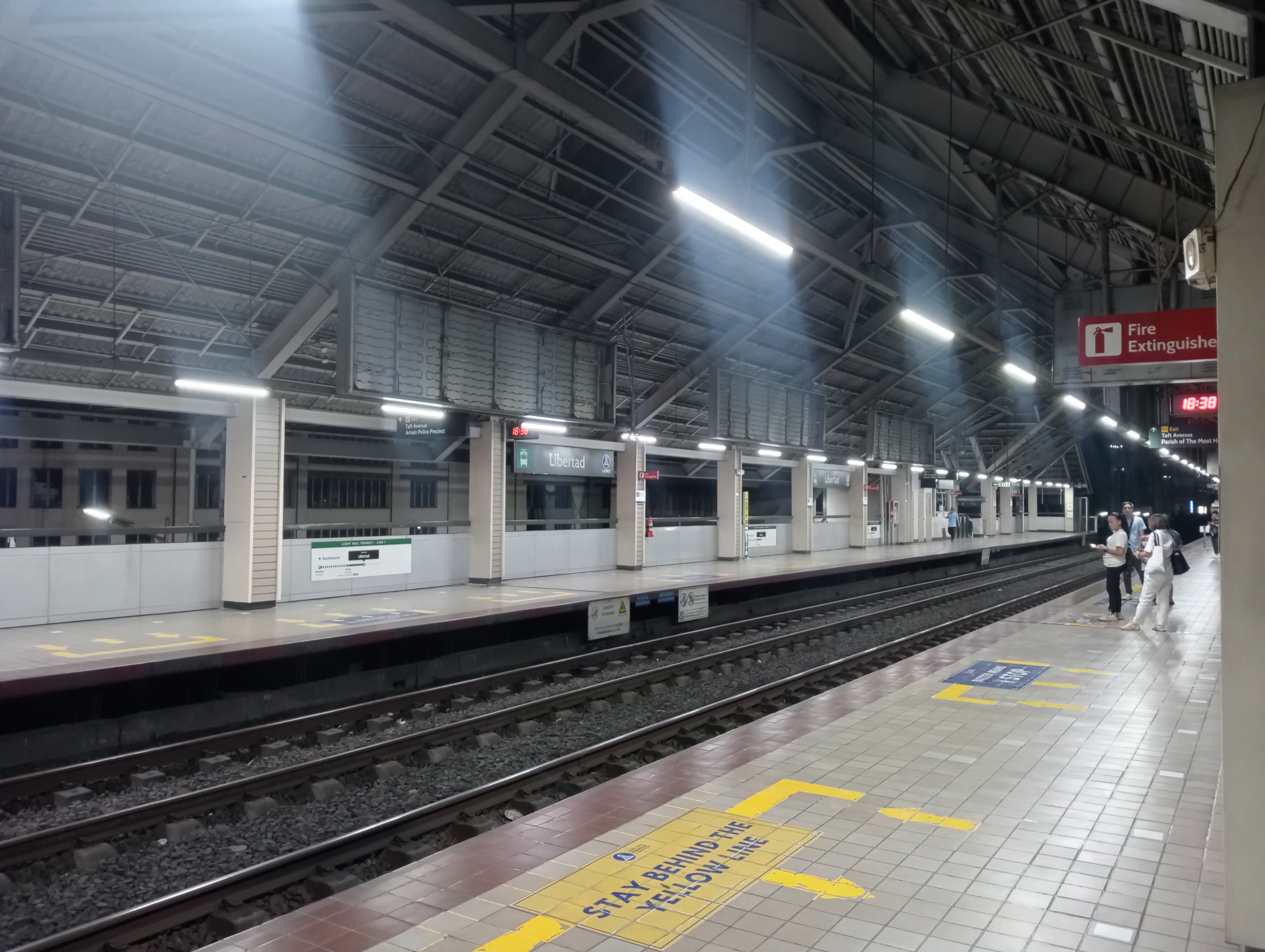

General information
- Other names: Antonio Arnaiz; Arnaiz
- Location: Taft Avenue, Santa Clara; Pasay, Metro Manila, Philippines
- Owner: Department of Transportation – Light Rail Transit Authority
- Operator: Light Rail Manila Corporation
- Line: LRT Line 1
- Platforms: 2 (2 side)
- Tracks: 2

Construction
- Structure type: Elevated
- Parking: Yes (Victory Pasay Mall / Pasay City Mall & Public Market)

History
- Opened: December 1, 1984; 41 years ago

Services
Preceding station	Manila LRT	Following station
Gil Puyat towards Fernando Poe Jr.	LRT Line 1	EDSA towards Dr. Santos
Track layout
Location
- Location within Metro Manila Location within Luzon Location within Philippines

Libertad station is an elevated Light Rail Transit (LRT) station located on the LRT Line 1 (LRT-1) system in Pasay, Metro Manila, Philippines. It is situated at the intersection of Taft Avenue and Arnaiz Avenue. The station is named after the former Libertad (Spanish for "liberty") Street, now a part of Arnaiz Avenue. The name Libertad survives as an area name after the old street.

Libertad station is the eighth station for trains headed to Fernando Poe Jr., the eighteenth station for trains headed to Dr. Santos, and is one of the four stations serving Pasay, the others are Gil Puyat, EDSA, and Baclaran.

== History ==
Libertad station was constructed as part of the original alignment of Metrorail (present-day LRT-1), beginning in September 1981, after an economic recession delayed the project’s initial timeline. It formed part of the line's first constructed segment along Taft Avenue between EDSA and Libertad in Pasay. It was opened to the public on December 1, 1984, as part of the line’s initial southern section, known as the Taft Line, which was the first segment to become operational.

== Transportation links ==
There are bus terminals for some bus lines near the station, while jeepneys, taxis, and tricycles stop at and around the station entrance. The buses also stop near the station, for those riding buses that do not stop at the nearby bus terminals. Jeepneys that leave adjacent to the station head along Arnaiz Avenue for various parts of Caloocan, Makati, Manila, and Pasay.

== Nearby landmarks ==
The station is adjacent to retail establishments especially the Pasay City Mall and Public Market and Wellcome Plaza (also known as Masagana Citimall, which houses a Puregold branch).

== Gallery ==
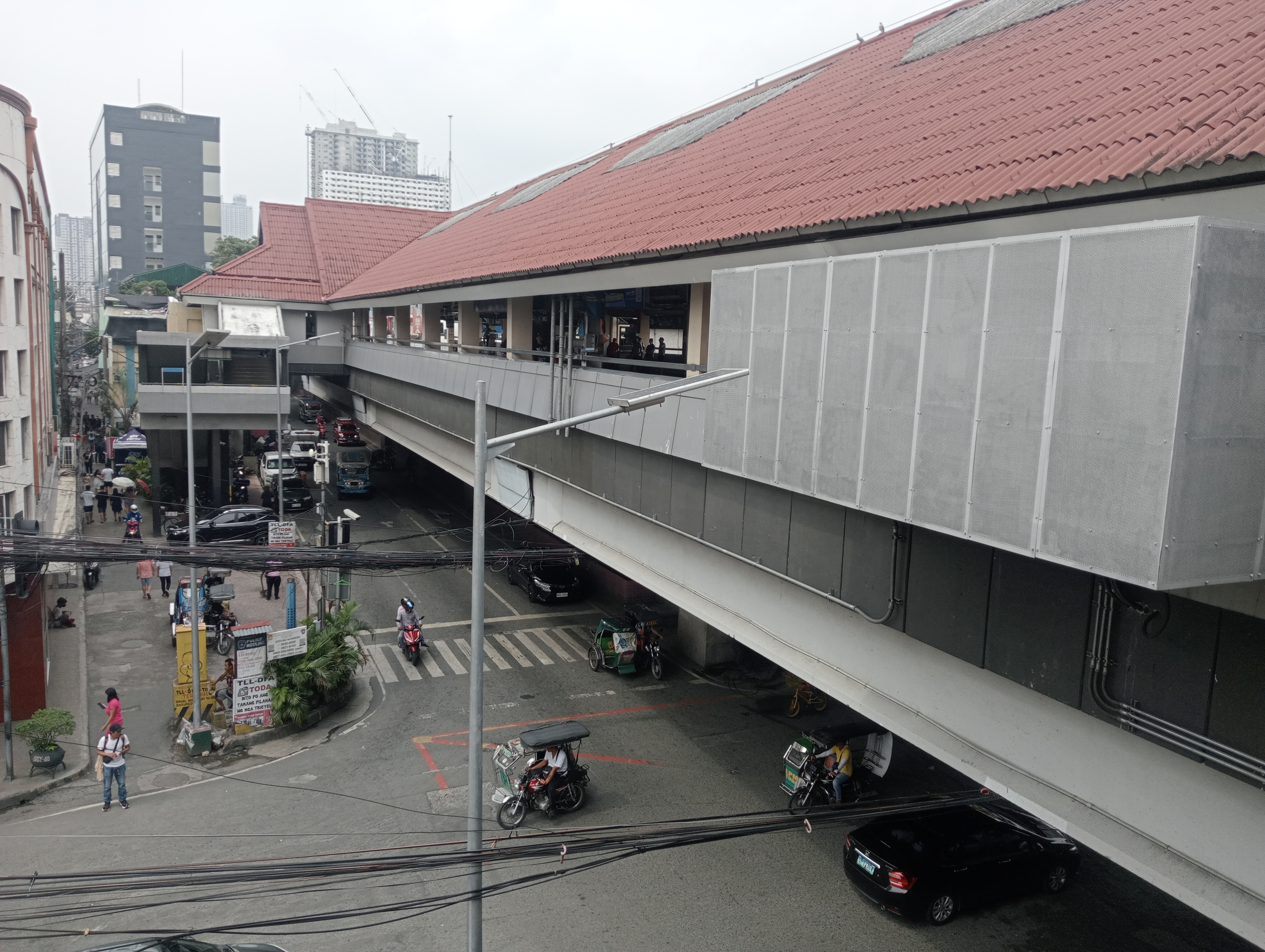
Exterior

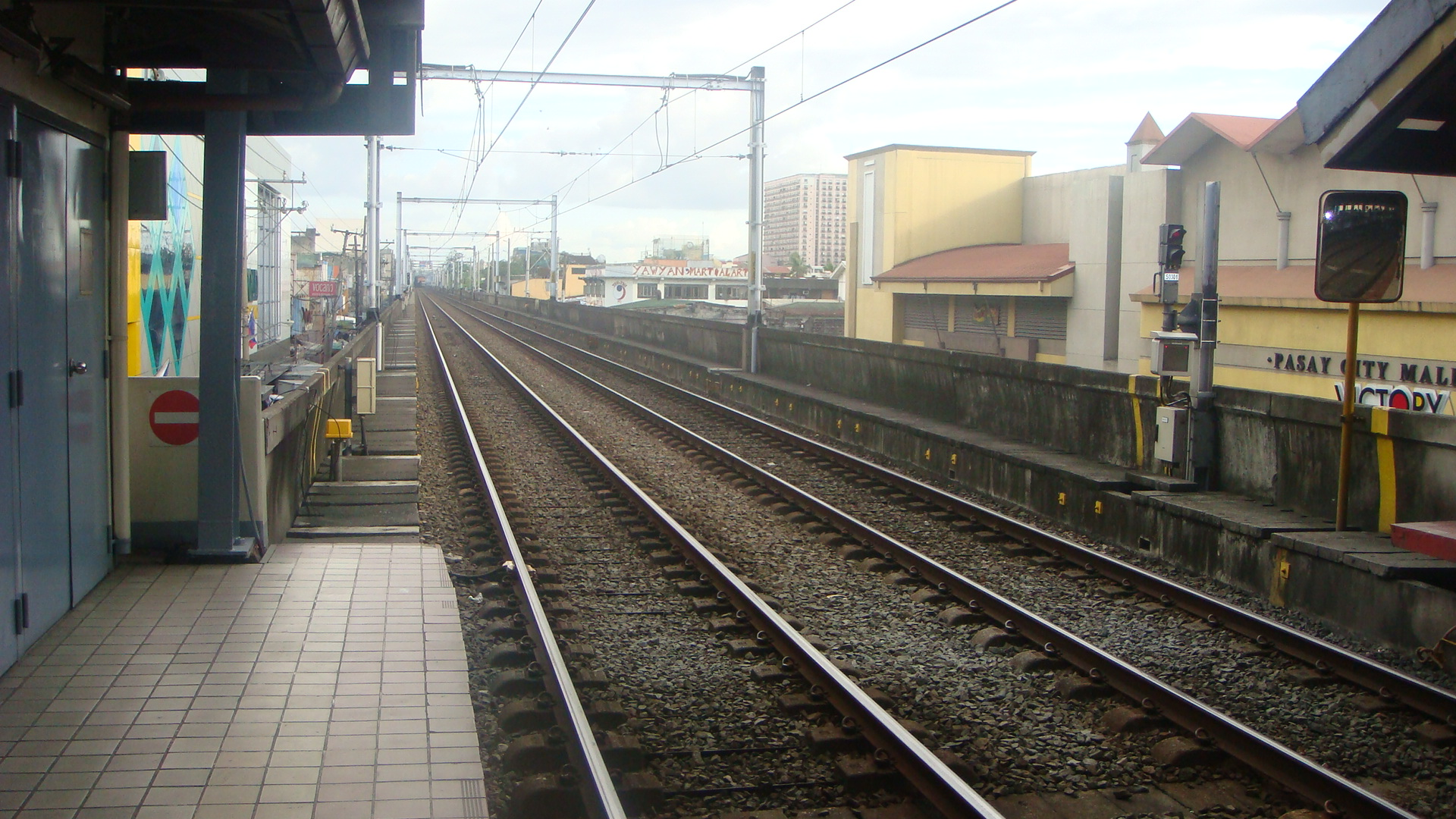
The rails

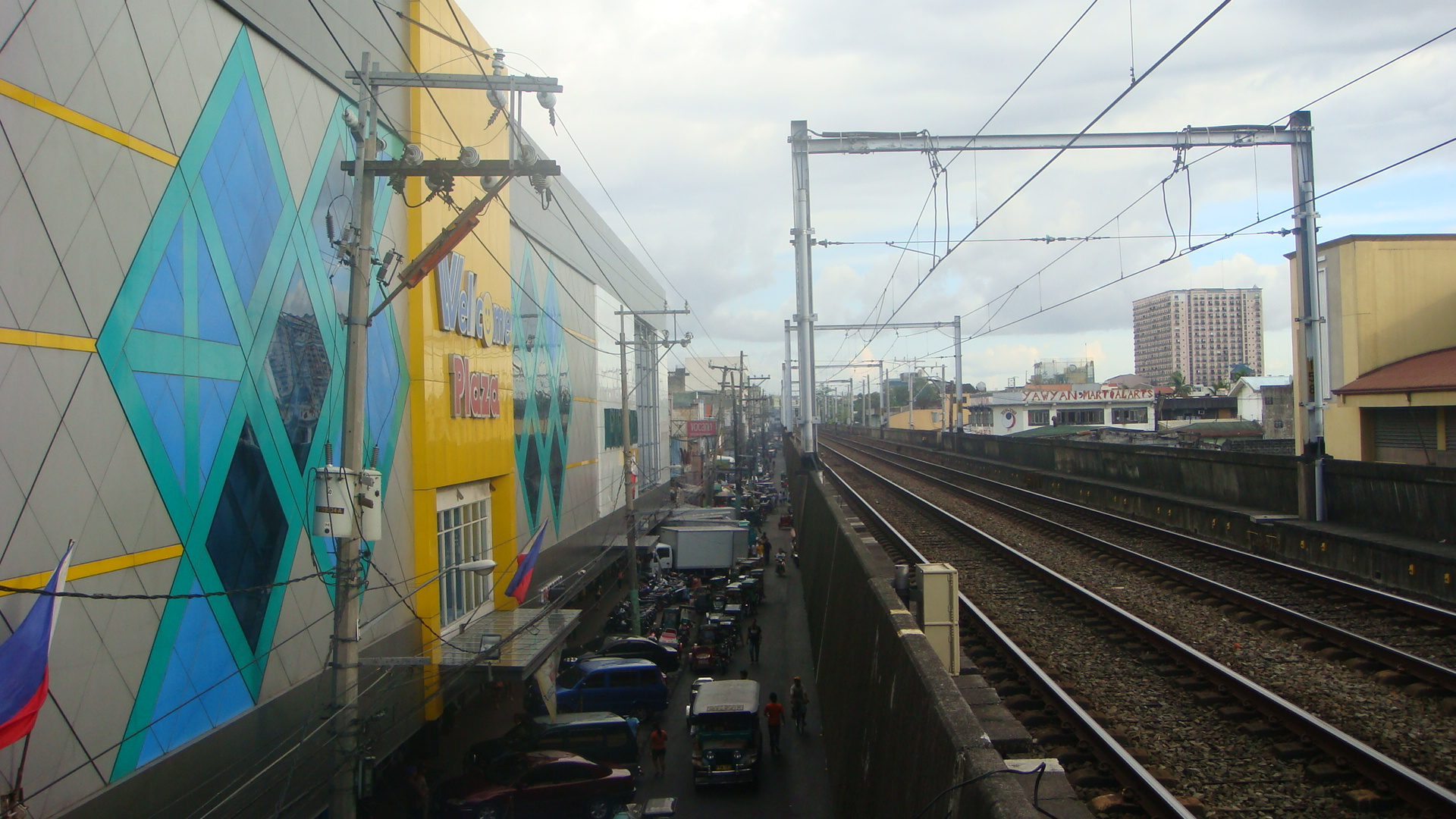
View of nearby malls

== See also ==
- List of rail transit stations in Metro Manila
- Manila Light Rail Transit System
