= WalterMart =

Filipino chain of community shopping malls

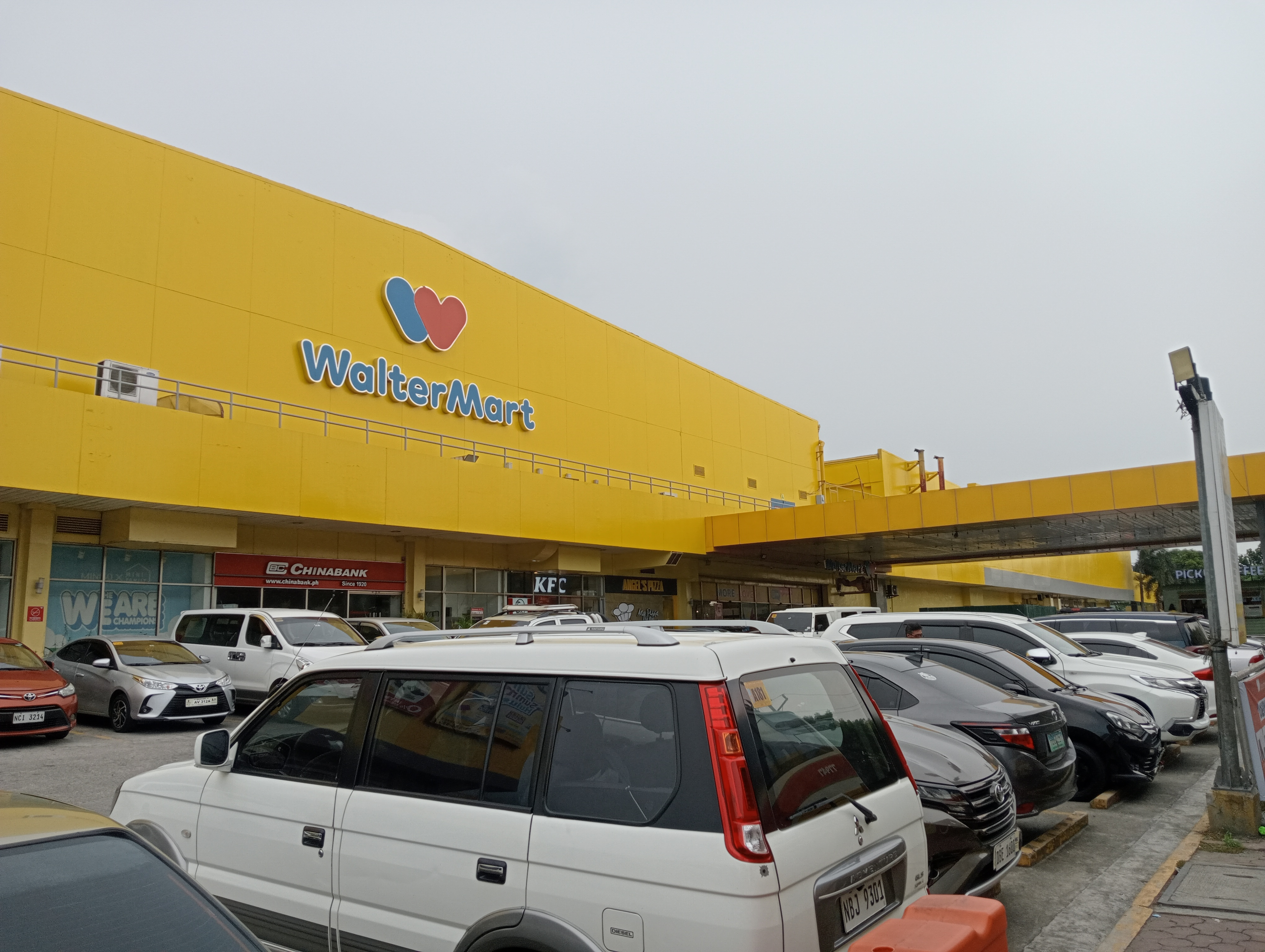
- Trece Martires branch in Cavite
- Type: Subsidiary
- Industry: Retail
- Founded: 1990; 36 years ago
- Founder: Wilson Lim
- Headquarters: 7th floor WalterMart Building 8001 A, North EDSA, Veterans Village, Quezon City, Philippines
- Area served: Metro Manila, Calabarzon, Central Luzon
- Key people: Wilson Lim Jr., managing director
- Number of employees: 3,000
- Website: waltermart.com.ph

WalterMart is a Filipino chain of community shopping malls owned by Abenson Ventures, Inc. and are located in Metro Manila, Central Luzon, and Calabarzon. The chain operates its anchor stores that include WalterMart Supermarket, W Department Store, Abenson Appliances and Abenson Home Furniture. Filipino retail stores, such as Watsons, and Ace Hardware, also occupy most of WalterMart's branches.

WalterMart's corporate headquarters are located in North EDSA, Quezon City.

== History ==
WalterMart's logo from 1990 to 2017. However, this was used as a secondary logo, and it is still seen on the facade until 2023.

WalterMart was founded in the 1990s by Wilson Lim, at the time of the economic crisis when the major players were not expanding aggressively. The company saw that there was an opportunity to expand in developing communities and uplift their standards of living by providing gainful employment to the locals and improving their shopping experience.

In January 2013, SM Retail and SM Prime entered into a joint venture agreement with WalterMart to co-manage the operations of WM-branded community-based malls located in the provinces of Central Luzon, Southern Tagalog and cities in Metro Manila.

In February 2016, the SM–Waltermart group rescinded an earlier deal to jointly develop shopping malls with 8990 Holdings as these may take business away from SM's shopping centers.

On April 26, 2018, WalterMart opened the first branch of W Mall on Macapagal Boulevard in Pasay.

== WalterMart Supermarket ==
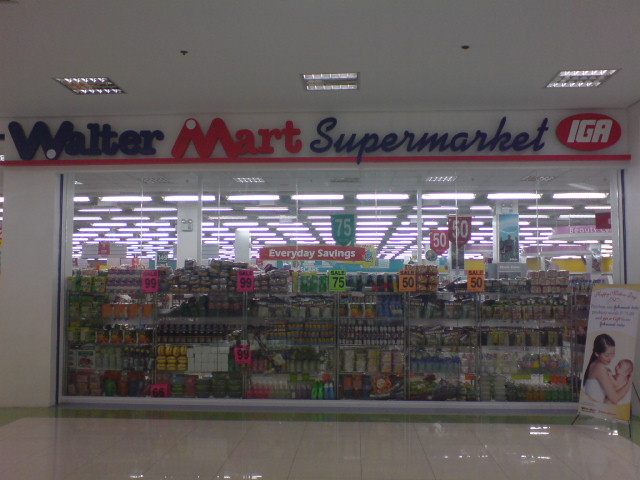
WalterMart Supermarket branch in Santa Maria, Bulacan

WalterMart Supermarket is located within most WalterMart malls, as well as Ayala Malls Serin in Tagaytay. The first supermarket started along E. Rodriguez Avenue in Quezon City. In 1995, the owners entered into a partnership with Independent Grocers Alliance (IGA), making it the only supermarket chain in the Philippines to become a member of the organization. Currently, it is now one of the youngest and fastest-growing supermarket chains in the Philippines with 47 more locations in Metro Manila, Central, and South Luzon.

== Branches ==
=== Metro Manila ===
- Bicutan
- Caloocan
- E. Rodriguez
- Makati
- North Edsa
- Sucat
- The Junction
- WMall Macapagal
- WMall Muntinlupa West

=== Calabarzon ===
Batangas

- Balayan
- Batangas
- Nasugbu
- San Pascual
- Tanauan

Cavite

- Bacoor
- Carmona
- Dasmariñas
- General Trias
- Naic
- Silang
- Trece Martires

Laguna

- Cabuyao
- Makiling
- Santa Rosa
- Santa Rosa Bel-Air

Quezon

- Candelaria

Rizal

- Antipolo
- Taytay

=== Central Luzon ===
Bataan

- Balanga

Bulacan

- Altaraza
- Baliwag
- Guiguinto
- Malolos
- Plaridel
- San Rafael
- Santa Maria

Nueva Ecija

- Cabanatuan
- Gapan
- San Jose
- Talavera

Pampanga

- Arayat
- Mabalacat
- San Fernando

Tarlac

- Capas
- Concepcion
- Paniqui

Zambales

- Subic
