= Fernando Poe Jr. station =

Train station in Quezon City, Philippines

Coordinates: 14°39′26.98″N 121°1′16.36″E

| Fernando Poe Jr. |
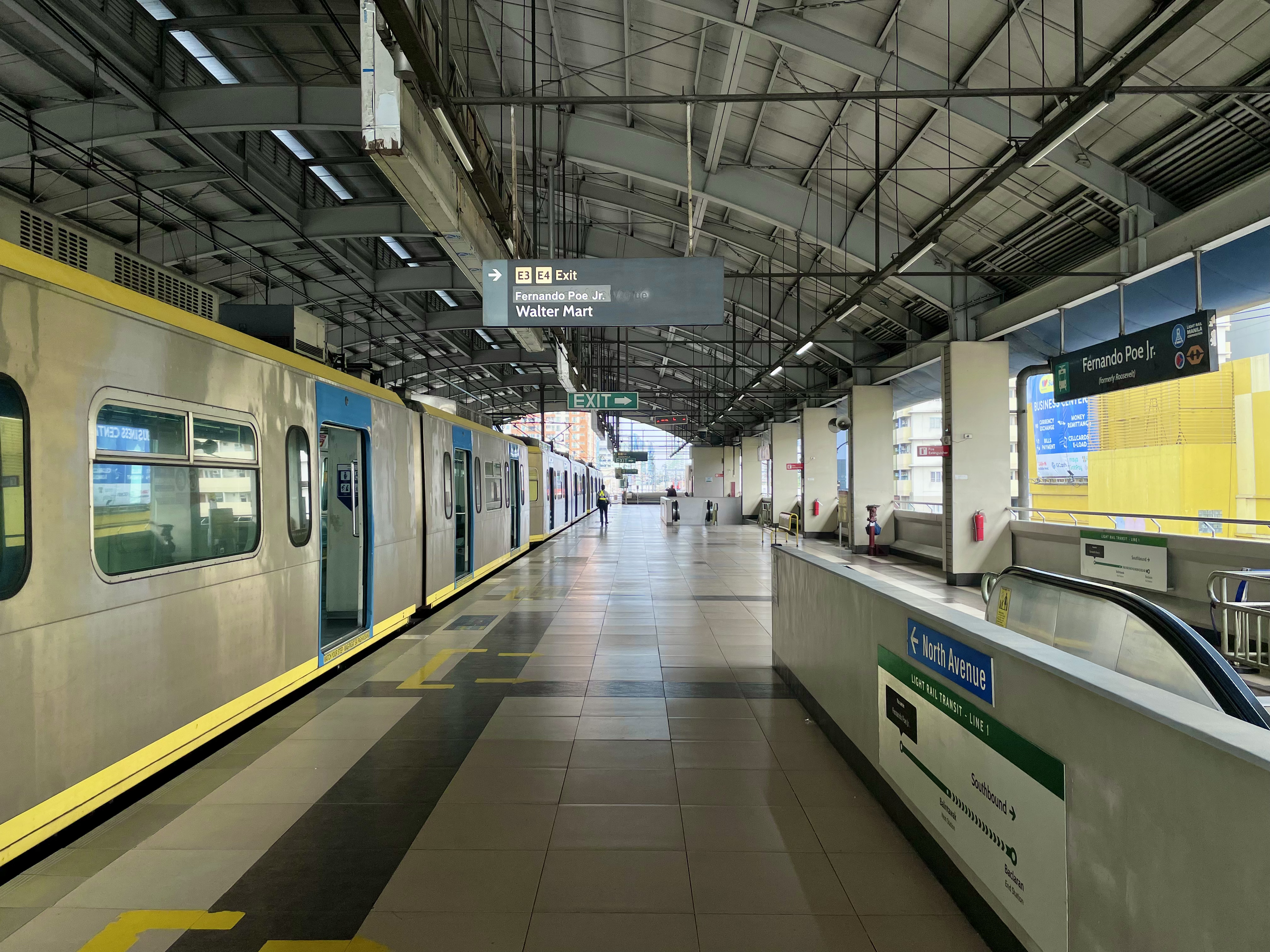
- Station platform in 2026

General information
- Location: 1039 EDSA, Ramon Magsaysay & Veterans Village; Quezon City, Metro Manila, Philippines
- Owner: Light Rail Transit Authority
- Operator: Light Rail Manila Corporation
- Line: LRT Line 1
- Platforms: 2 (2 side)
- Tracks: 2
- Connections: 1 Roosevelt

Construction
- Structure type: Elevated
- Parking: Yes (WalterMart North EDSA, Jackman Plaza Muñoz, Motortrade Plaza)
- Accessible: yes

Other information
- Station code: GL01

History
- Opened: October 22, 2010; 15 years ago December 5, 2022; 3 years ago (reopening)
- Closed: September 5, 2020; 5 years ago (temporary)
- Former names: Roosevelt (2010–2023)

Services
| Preceding station | Manila LRT | Following station |
|---|---|---|
| Terminus | LRT Line 1 | Balintawak towards Dr. Santos |
Track layout
Location
- Location within Metro Manila Location within Luzon Location within Philippines

Fernando Poe Jr. station, also known by its previous name Roosevelt station, is the current northern terminus of the Light Rail Transit Line 1 (LRT-1) system. It opened on October 22, 2010, as part of the LRT-1 North Extension Project, as Roosevelt (Tagalog: [ˈrusvɛlt, ˈrusbɛlt]) and got its current name on August 20, 2023, almost two years after the namesake avenue was officially renamed after the Filipino actor.

Fernando Poe Jr. is one of the two LRT-1 stations serving Quezon City, the other being Balintawak.

It is located along EDSA at the boundary of barangays Veterans Village and Ramon Magsaysay (Bago Bantay) in Quezon City, both of Projects 7 and 8, respectively. It links to Congressional Avenue and Fernando Poe Jr. Avenue.

== History ==
=== Initial planning and construction ===
The station was first planned for the second phase of the MRT Line 3 (MRT-3), known as Muñoz station. The second phase would have extended the MRT Line 3 from its northern terminus at North Avenue to Monumento to create a seamless rail loop around Metro Manila. The station was planned to be located near the San Francisco del Monte River. It was also planned as an intermediate station, then called Roosevelt, on the EDSA North Transit (ENT) Link, a separate project that would have linked the MRT-3 at North Avenue with the LRT Line 1 (LRT-1) and PNR North Main Line in Caloocan.

The second phase of the MRT-3 and the ENT Link were shelved in favor of the Line 1 North Extension Project, a 5.4-kilometer (3.4 mi) extension of LRT-1 to the North Avenue station of MRT-3 as part of the MRT-LRT closing the loop project to integrate the operations of LRT-1 and MRT-3. The station site was moved from the San Francisco del Monte River to the front of WalterMart North EDSA. However, this plan for integration has yet to happen as the North Triangle Station is under construction. Construction of the North Extension started in July 2008 and was completed in 2010. Roosevelt station was opened on October 22, 2010.

The station was initially named after Roosevelt Avenue, which was in turn named in honor of U.S. President Franklin D. Roosevelt. The avenue was later renamed Fernando Poe Jr. Avenue on December 10, 2021.

=== Temporary closure ===
On August 7, 2020, it was announced that Roosevelt station would be temporarily closed from September 5. As part of the construction of the North Triangle Common Station, the tracks extending eastward from Roosevelt station have to be realigned in order to provide the necessary connection to North Triangle station. Hence, during this temporary closure, Balintawak station once again served as the northern terminus of the line. Originally scheduled until December 8, 2020, the temporary closure was later extended until further notice.

On November 26, 2022, the Light Rail Manila Corporation announced the planned reopening of Roosevelt station on December 5, pending testing and system adaptation to the new signaling system; They followed up and confirmed that the reopening would proceed as scheduled.

=== Renaming ===
On August 20, 2023, Roosevelt station was renamed Fernando Poe Jr. station, two years after the adjacent avenue was named after the Filipino actor through Republic Act No. 11608. The renaming of the station was approved through LRTA Board of Directors Resolution No. 002-2023, following a request from Senator Lito Lapid to rename the station as a "necessary consequence" of the renaming law.

== Transportation links ==
There are several buses, jeepneys, and UV Express plying EDSA, as well as Congressional Avenue and Fernando Poe Jr. Avenue. The station serves as an interchange with the EDSA Carousel, which is accessible through the emergency exits of the station.

== Nearby landmarks ==
The station is close to various shopping places and malls, particularly WalterMart North EDSA, Jackman Plaza Muñoz, Muñoz Market, and S&R Membership Shopping - Congressional. It is also close to STI College Muñoz-EDSA, Panorama Technocenter, and the Iglesia Ni Cristo Locale of Bago Bantay.

== Gallery ==
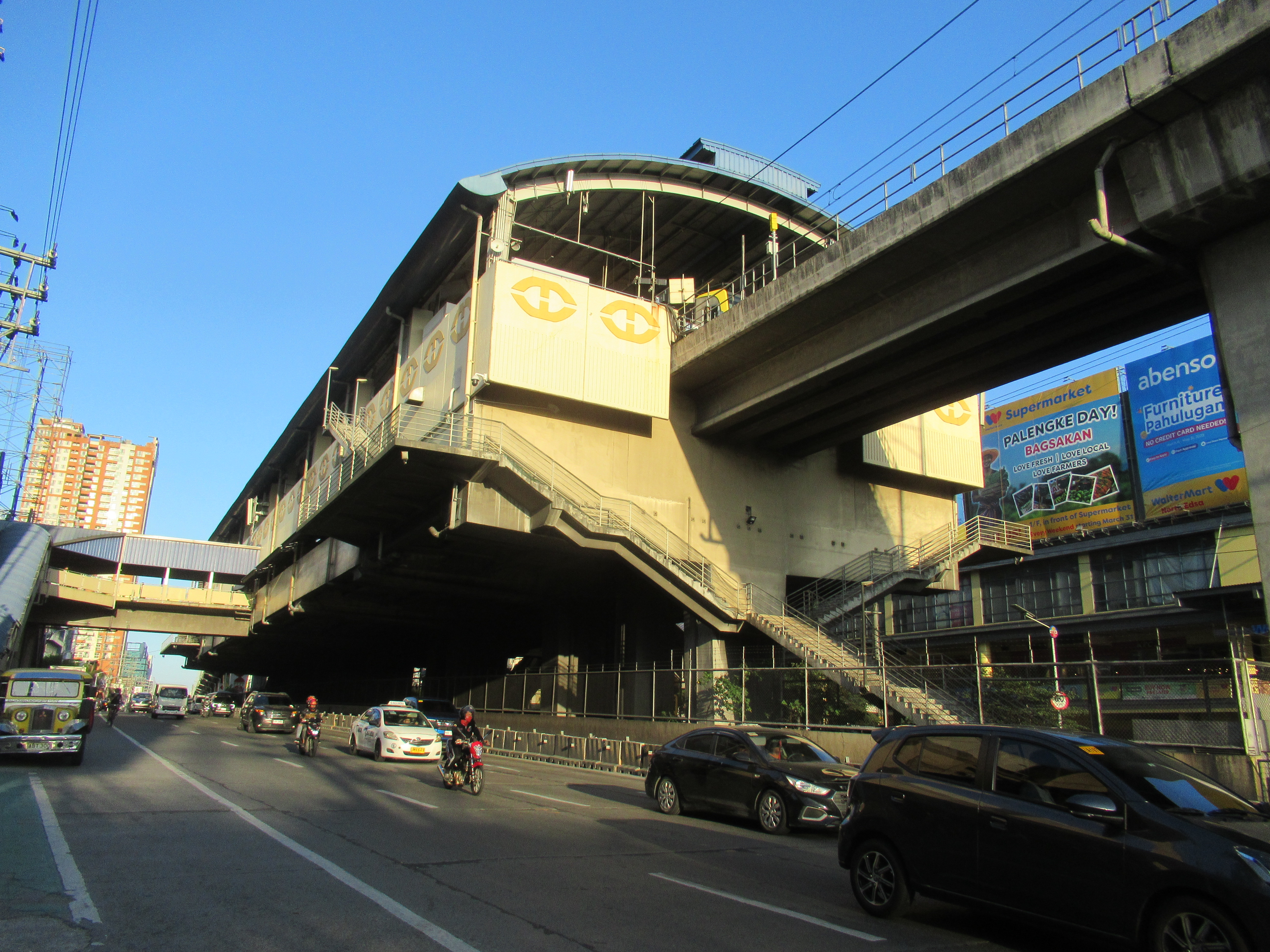
View of the station from street level

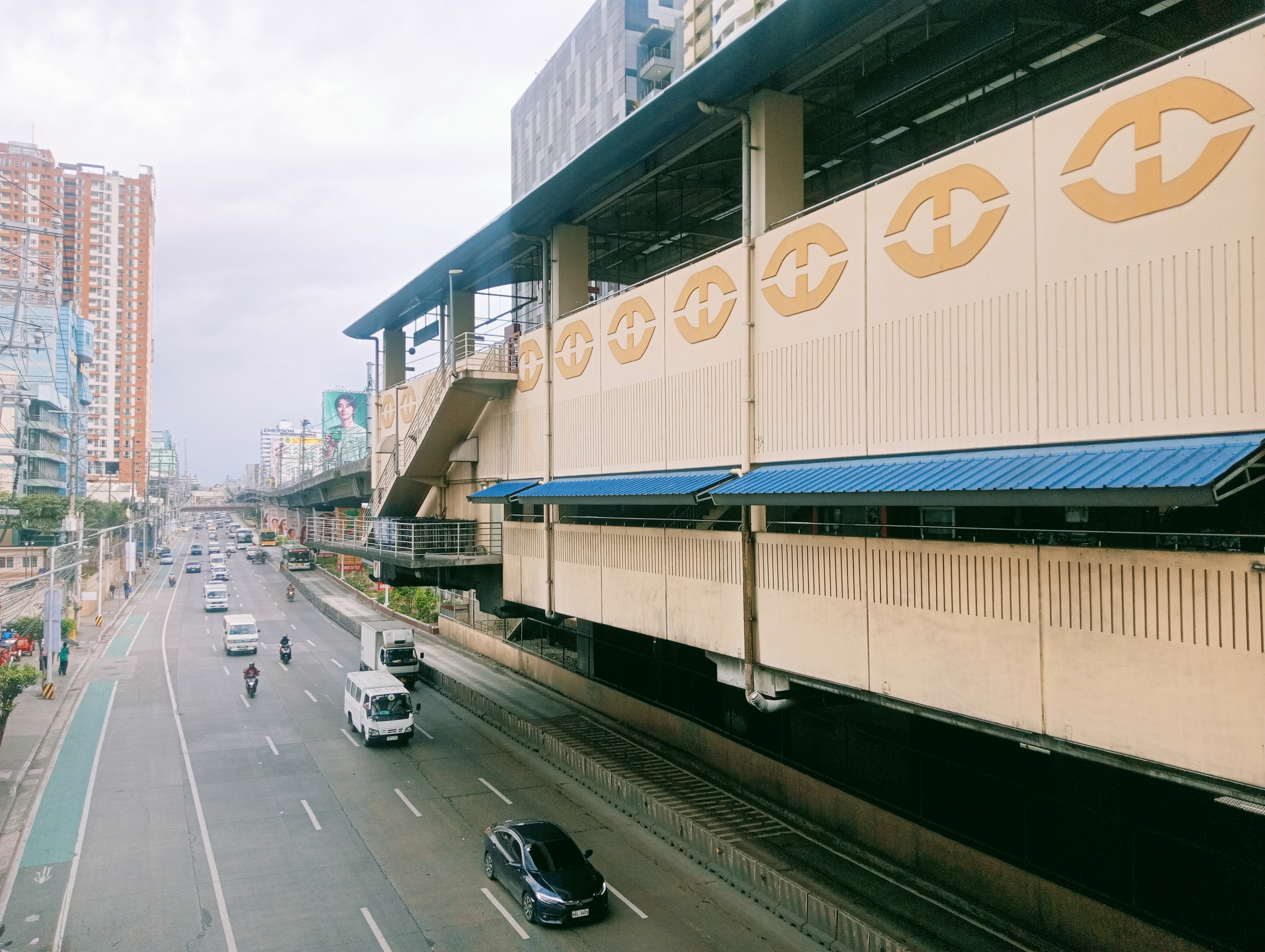
View of the station from the concourse level footbridge

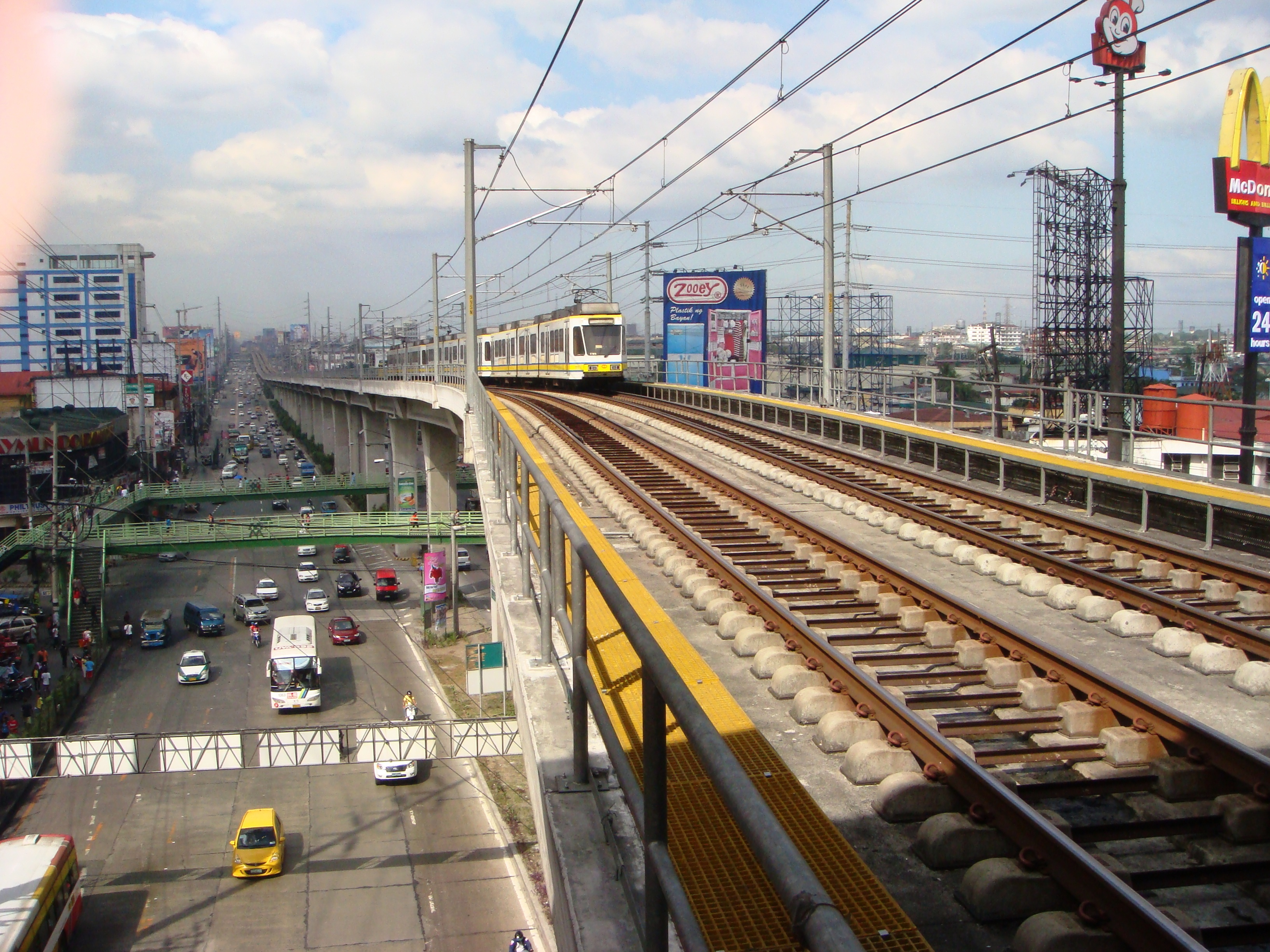
Overview of the track from the station

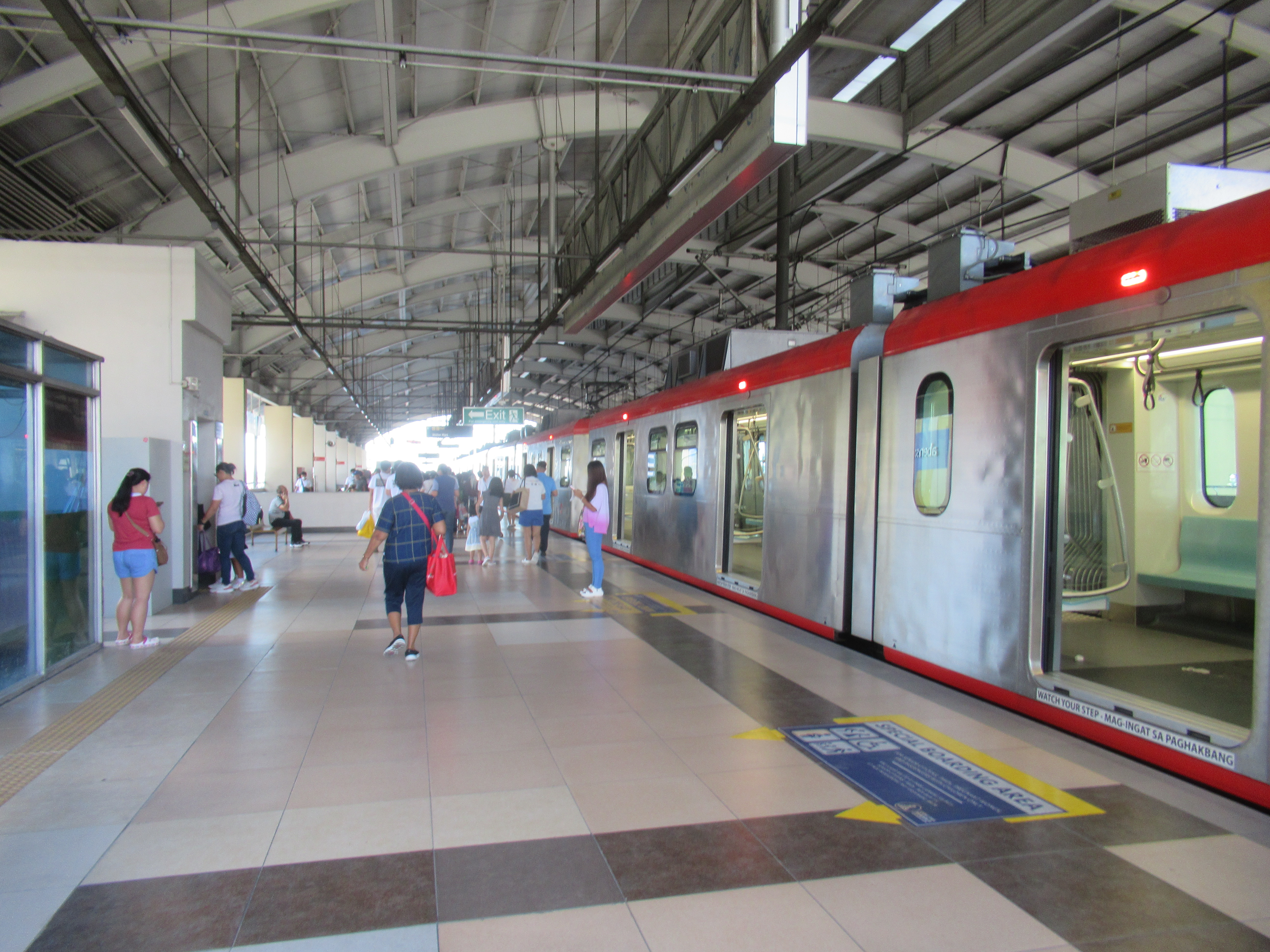
LRTA 13000 class train at the station

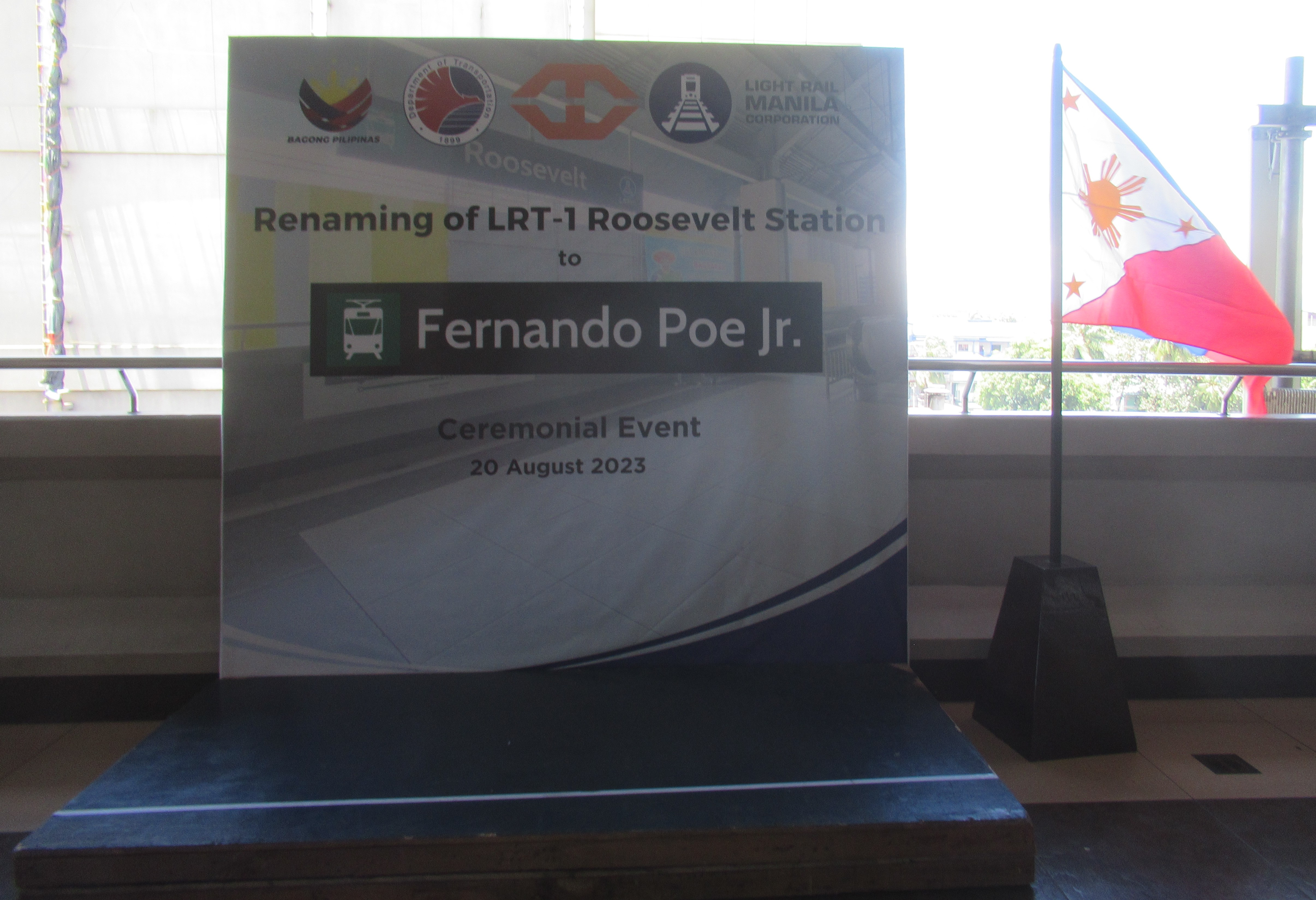
Ceremonial event

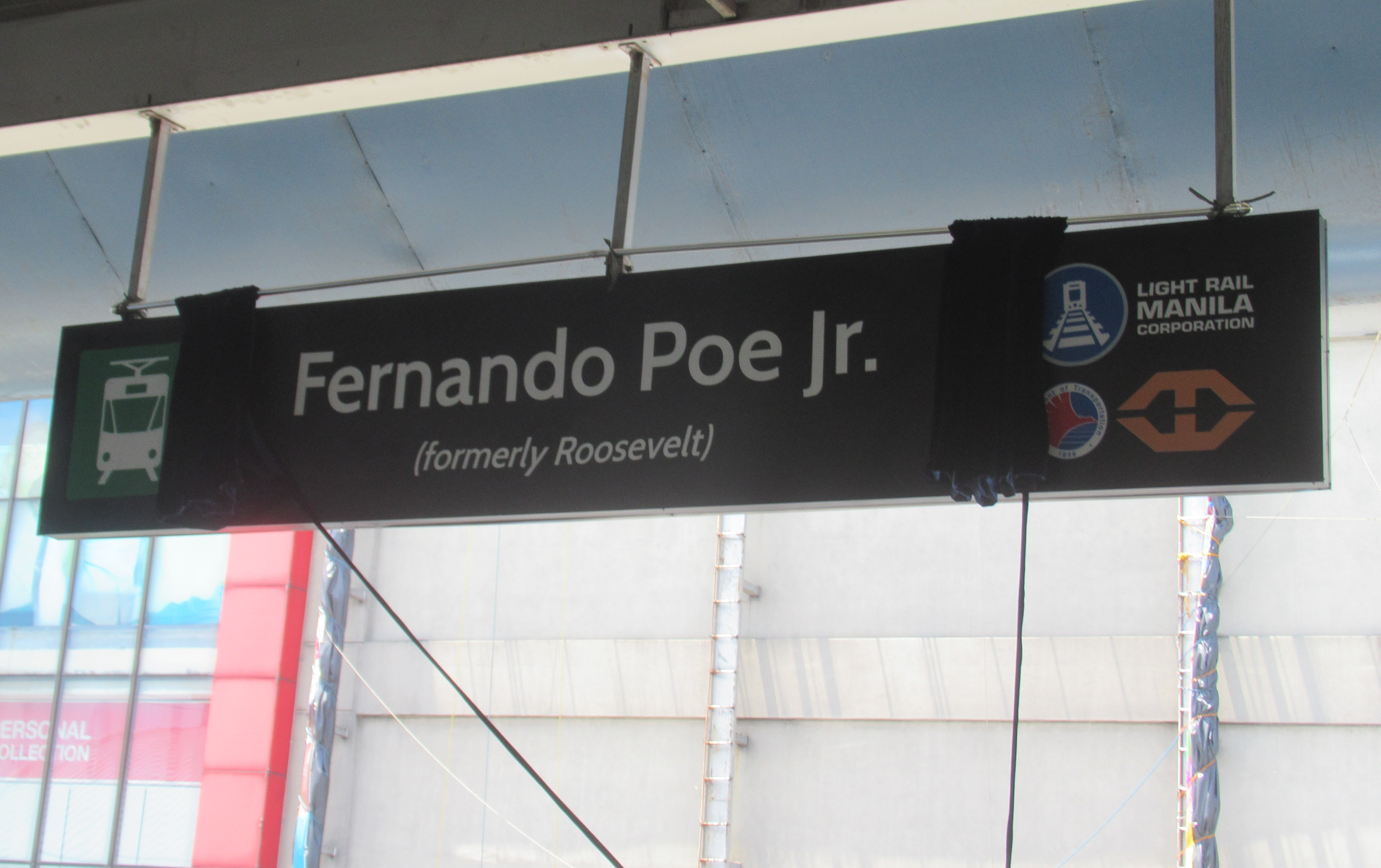
Unveiled marker

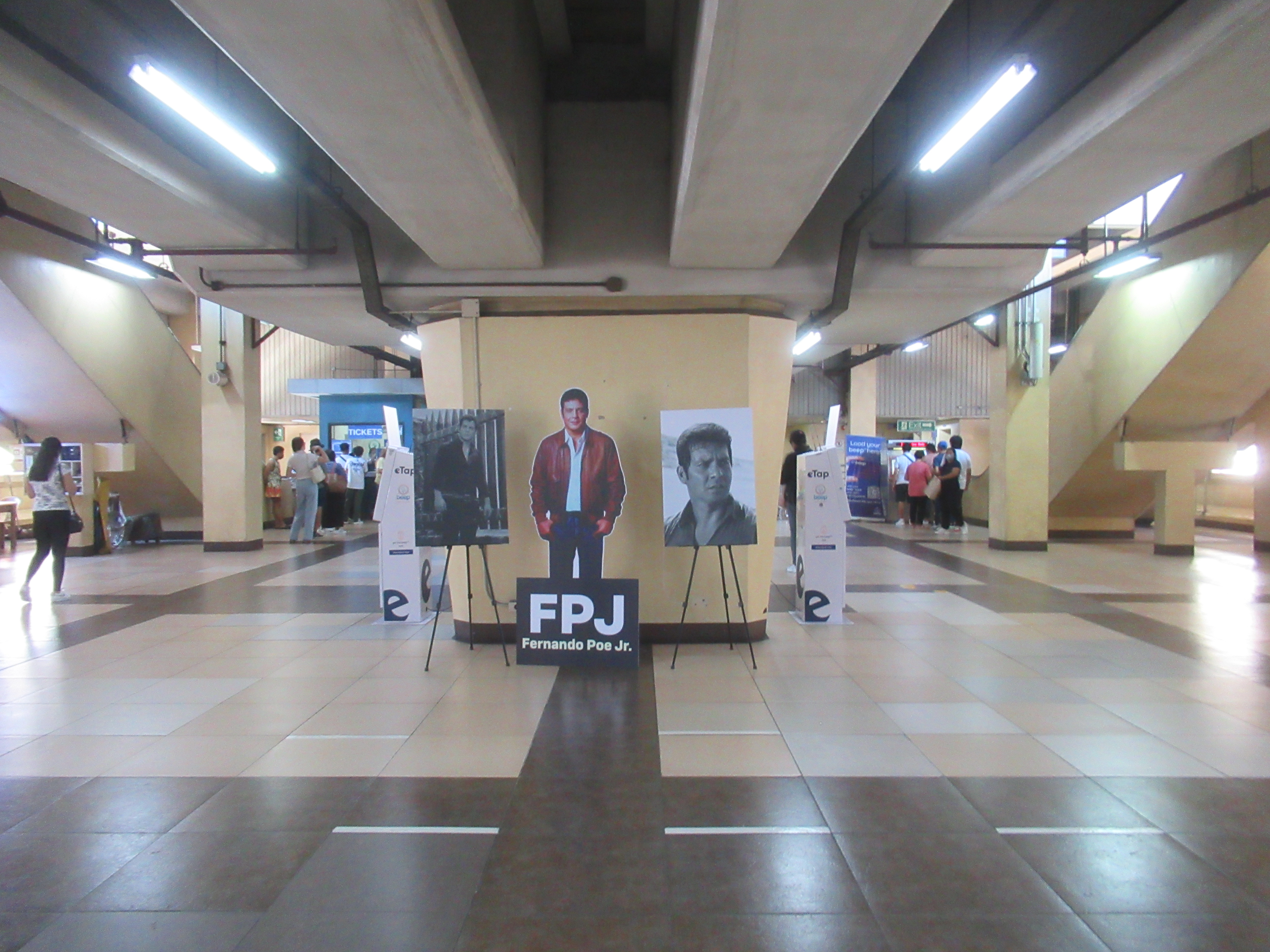
Pop-up exhibit

== See also ==
- List of rail transit stations in Metro Manila
- Manila Light Rail Transit System
