= MRTC 3000 class =

Light rail vehicle built by ČKD Tatra, a Czech tram manufacturer

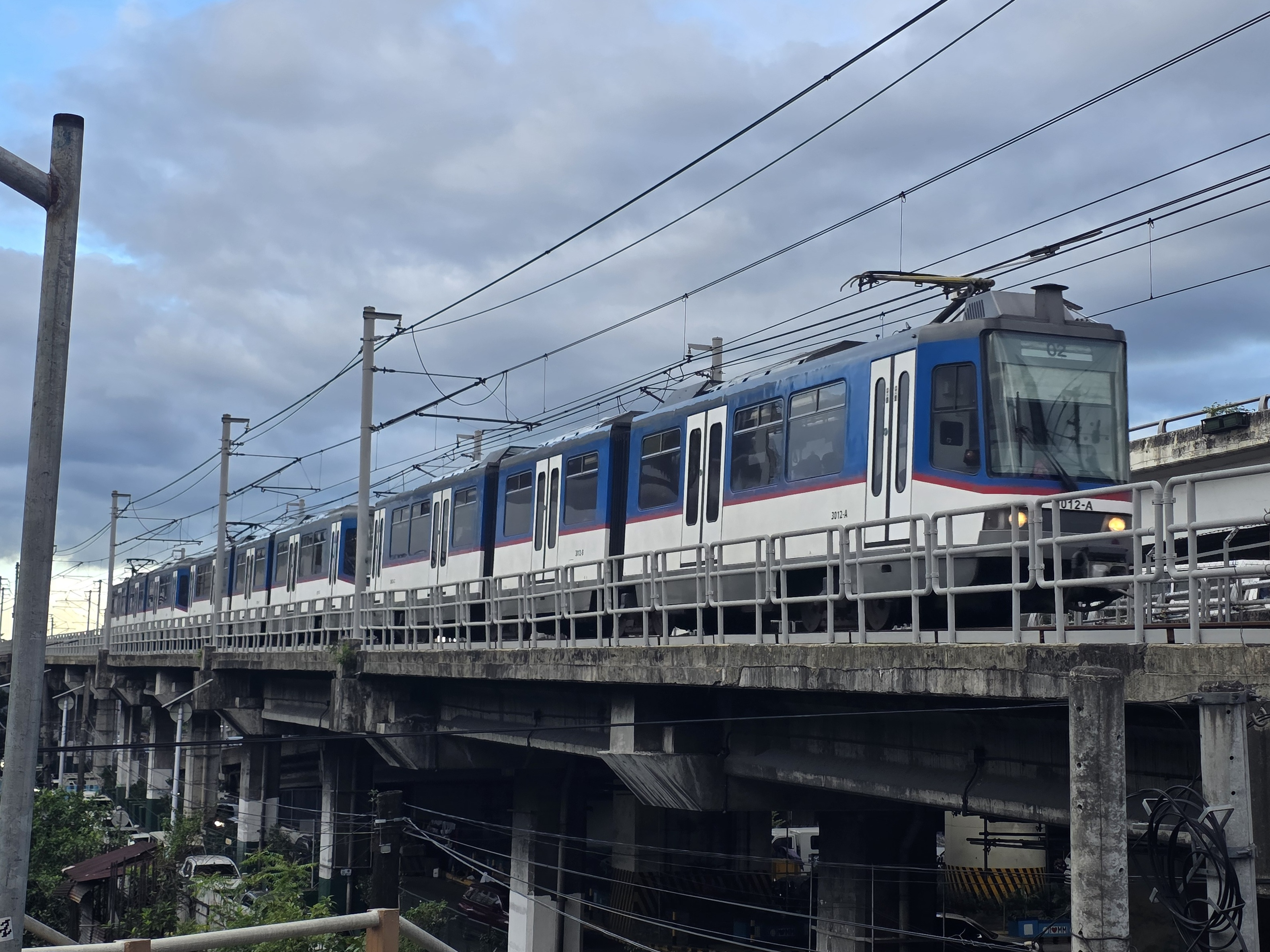
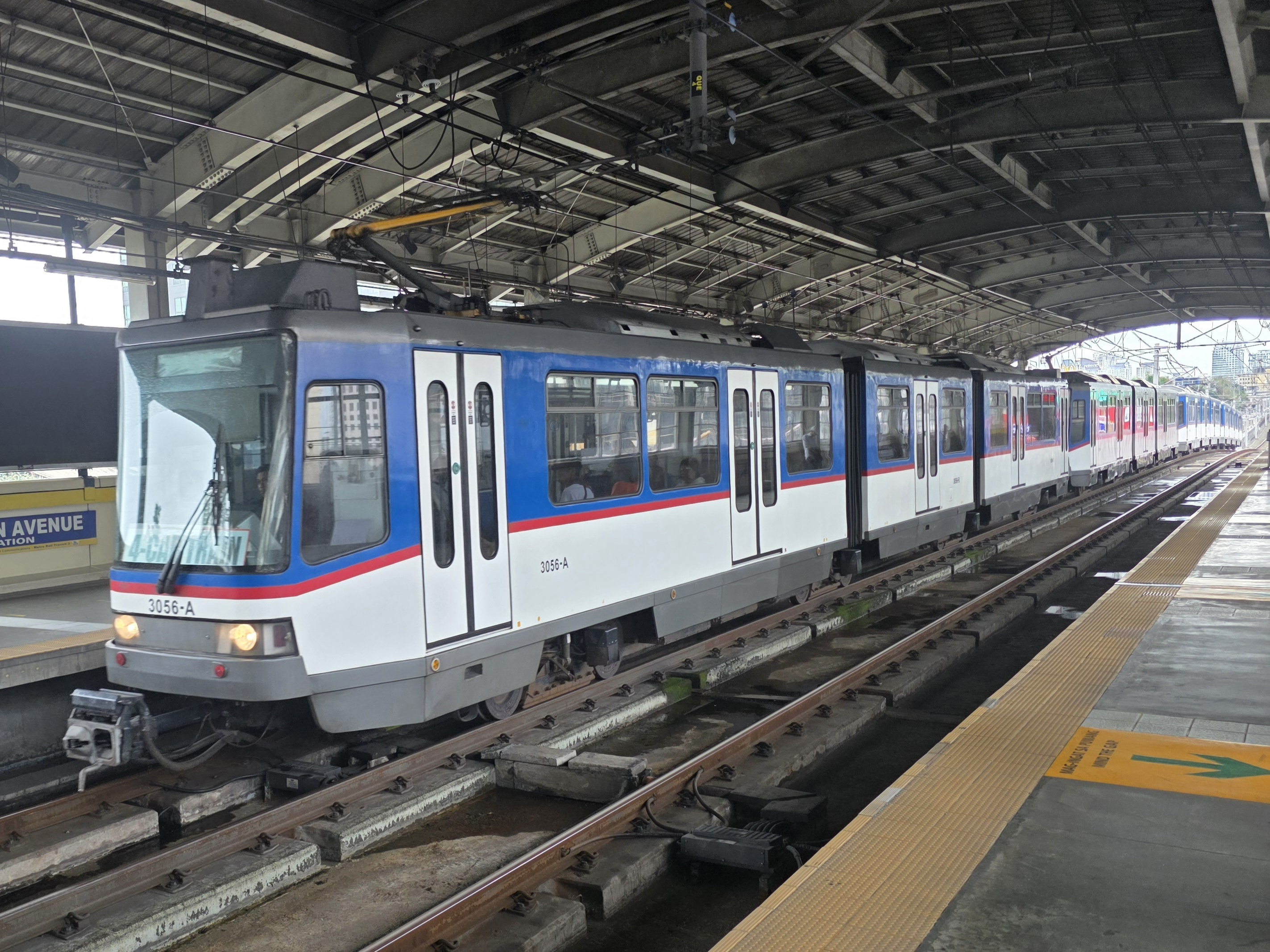
- A three-car Tatra RT8D5M train at the Ortigas Interchange A four-car Tatra RT8D5M train at Quezon Avenue station

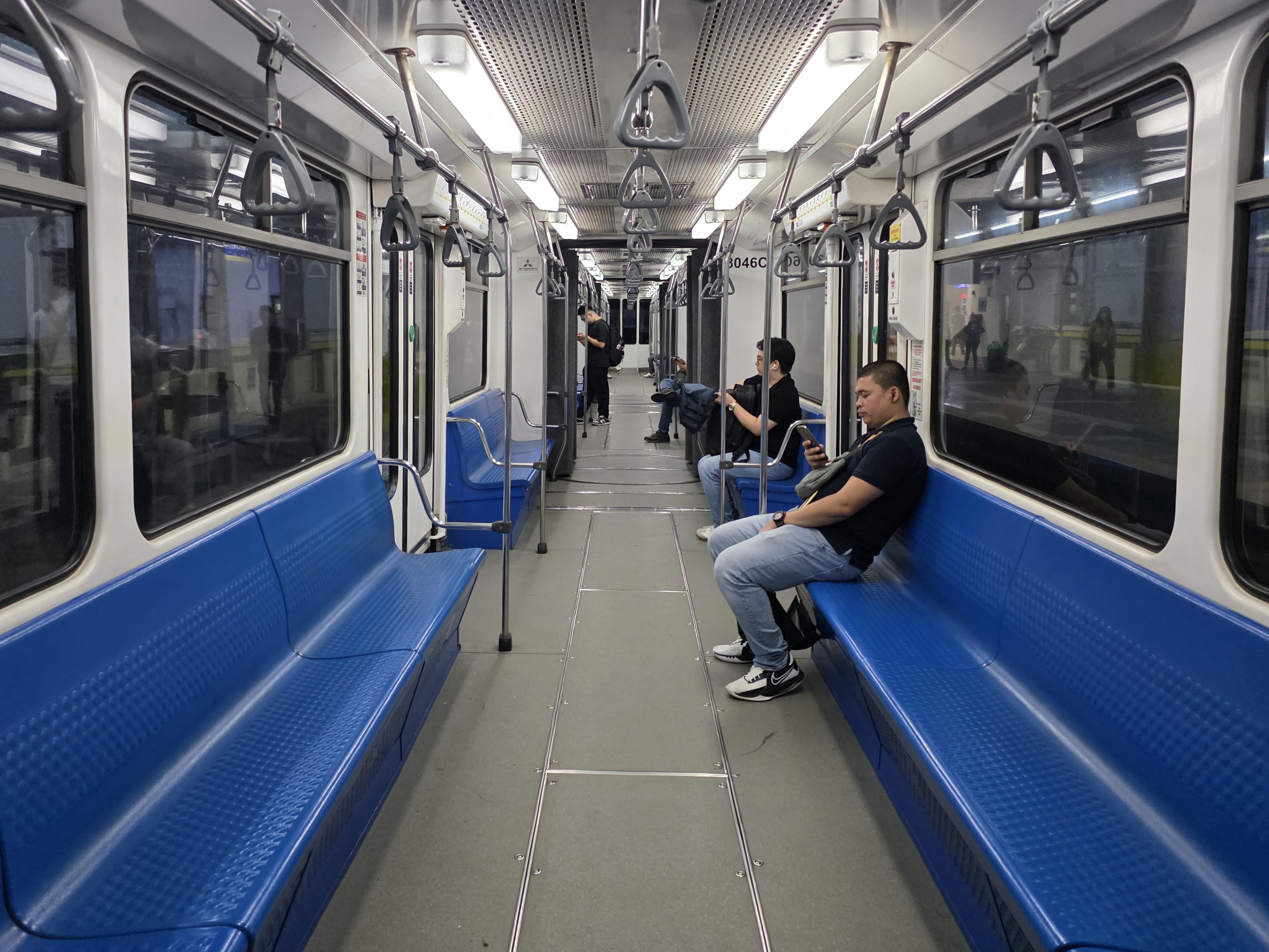
- Train interior in August 2025
- Stock type: Light rail vehicle
- In service: 1999–present
- Manufacturer: ČKD Tatra
- Designer: Patrik Kotas
- Assembly: Prague, Czech Republic
- Constructed: 1994–1995 (prototype); 1997–1999
- Entered service: December 15, 1999; 26 years ago
- Refurbished: 2008–2009; 2016–2017, 2019–2023
- Number built: 74 vehicles (1 prototype, 73 regular)
- Number in service: 72 vehicles
- Number scrapped: 1 (prototype)
- Formation: 3/4 cars per trainset
- Design code: RT8D5M
- Fleet numbers: 3001–3073 (Note: Originally numbered 001–073 until 2023; the current numbering scheme was first implemented in 2017.)
- Capacity: 394 per car (74 seats); 1,182–1,576 per train
- Operator: Department of Transportation
- Depot: North Avenue
- Line served: Line 3

Specifications
- Car body construction: Low alloy high tensile steel (body shell); Aluminum sheets (ceiling)
- Train length: 95.16 m (312 ft 2 29/64 in) (3 cars); 126.88 m (416 ft 3 9/32 in) (4 cars)
- Car length: 31.72 m (104 ft 13/16 in)
- Width: 2.5 m (8 ft 2 27/64 in)
- Height: 3.73 m (12 ft 2 27/32 in)
- Floor height: 0.925 m (3 ft 27/64 in)
- Platform height: 0.9 m (2 ft 11 7/16 in)
- Doors: Double-leaf plug-type; 5 per side: Width: 861–1,255 mm (34–49 in); Height: 1,900 mm (75 in)
- Articulated sections: 3
- Wheel diameter: 700–595 mm (28–23 in) (new–worn)
- Wheelbase: 1.9 m (6 ft 2 51/64 in)
- Maximum speed: 65 km/h (40 mph) (design); 60 km/h (37 mph) (service)
- Weight: 46.8 t (103,000 lb) (tare); 70.4 t (155,000 lb) (laden)
- Axle load: 8.8 t (19,000 lb)
- Steep gradient: 70‰
- Traction system: ČKD Trakce TV14Z IGBT chopper
- Traction motors: 8 × ČKD Trakce TE026A01-4 64.5 kW (86.5 hp) DC series-wound (1 hour rating: 375 V 190 A 1946 rpm)
- Power output: 516 kW (692 hp) per car; 1.55 MW (2,080 hp) (3 cars); 2.06 MW (2,760 hp) (4 cars)
- Transmission: Cardan drive
- Gear ratio: 7.42:1
- Acceleration: 1.03 m/s^{2} (3.4 ft/s^{2})
- Deceleration: 1.01 m/s^{2} (3.3 ft/s^{2}) (service); 1.58 m/s^{2} (5.2 ft/s^{2}) (emergency)
- Auxiliaries: 3 × 480 V AC 60 Hz static converter 2 × 24 V DC batteries
- HVAC: Thermo King roof-mounted air-conditioning
- Electric systems: 750 V DC overhead catenary
- Current collection: Faiveley single-arm pantograph
- UIC classification: Bo′+Bo′+Bo′+Bo′
- Bogies: Inside-frame type
- Minimum turning radius: 20 m (66 ft)
- Braking systems: Regenerative and rheostatic with discs and track brakes
- Safety systems: Alstom CITYFLO 250 fixed block with subsystems of EBICAB 900 ATP, EBI Screen 900 CTC, and EBI Lock 950 CBI
- Coupling system: Scharfenberg Type 330
- Headlight type: LED lamp
- Seating: Longitudinal
- Track gauge: 1,435 mm (4 ft 8 1/2 in) standard gauge

Notes/references
- Sourced from unless otherwise noted.

The MRTC 3000 class, also known as the Tatra RT8D5M, is the class of first-generation high-floor uni-directional (Note: They are uni-directional in the sense of having a distinguishable front and back, where one end has both the cab and the pantograph. However, they can travel at either direction at full speed as a train via multiple-unit train control should they be connected together facing opposite directions.) light rail vehicles in use on the Manila MRT Line 3 and built by Czech tram manufacturer ČKD Tatra. The LRVs are owned and operated by the Department of Transportation (DOTr).

Until 2025, the RT8D5M LRVs were owned by the Metro Rail Transit Corporation (MRTC) pursuant to its build-lease-transfer contract with the DOTr. These were also the last vehicles made by ČKD Tatra before it was taken over by Siemens.

== History ==
=== Purchase and production ===
Construction of the MRT Line 3 began in 1996 when the then-Department of Transportation and Communications (DOTC; later the Department of Transportation) entered into a build-lease-transfer agreement with the Metro Rail Transit Corporation (MRTC). MRTC signed a contract with ČKD Tatra in 1997 to supply the trains.

73 light rail cars were produced by ČKD in two batches; 49 were produced in 1998 and the other 24 were completed the following year. The first train was flown into Manila via plane while the remaining trains were transported by sea. The fleet also happened to be the last produced by ČKD before it was taken over by Siemens.

=== Prototype RT8D5 0029 ===
In late-March 1995, the first three-section tram was tested in Prague under the number 0029 as a prototype. It was a development of the Tatra KT8D5; 0029 retained its control, proportions, the front and rear sections, and unlike the later production vehicles, designed for bidirectional operation.

Prototype 0029 soon remained in Prague. On November 3, 1998, under orders of MRT-3's future operator, 0029 was used together with the Tatra T5A5 prototype, tram no. 0013, and T3 no. 6663 for crash tests in the main workshop in Hostivař. The tests were proven to be successful as 0029 was not significantly damaged. It then stood at the workshop for several years before being eventually scrapped.

=== Refurbishments and upgrades ===
All 73 light rail vehicles (LRV) were first refurbished from 2008 to 2009 by Sumitomo Corporation, its technical partner Mitsubishi Heavy Industries Engineering (MHIENG), and its subsidiary TES Philippines Inc. (TESP). The aging air-conditioning units of the trains since 1999 were replaced with new ones. The interior and exterior of the trains were also refurbished.

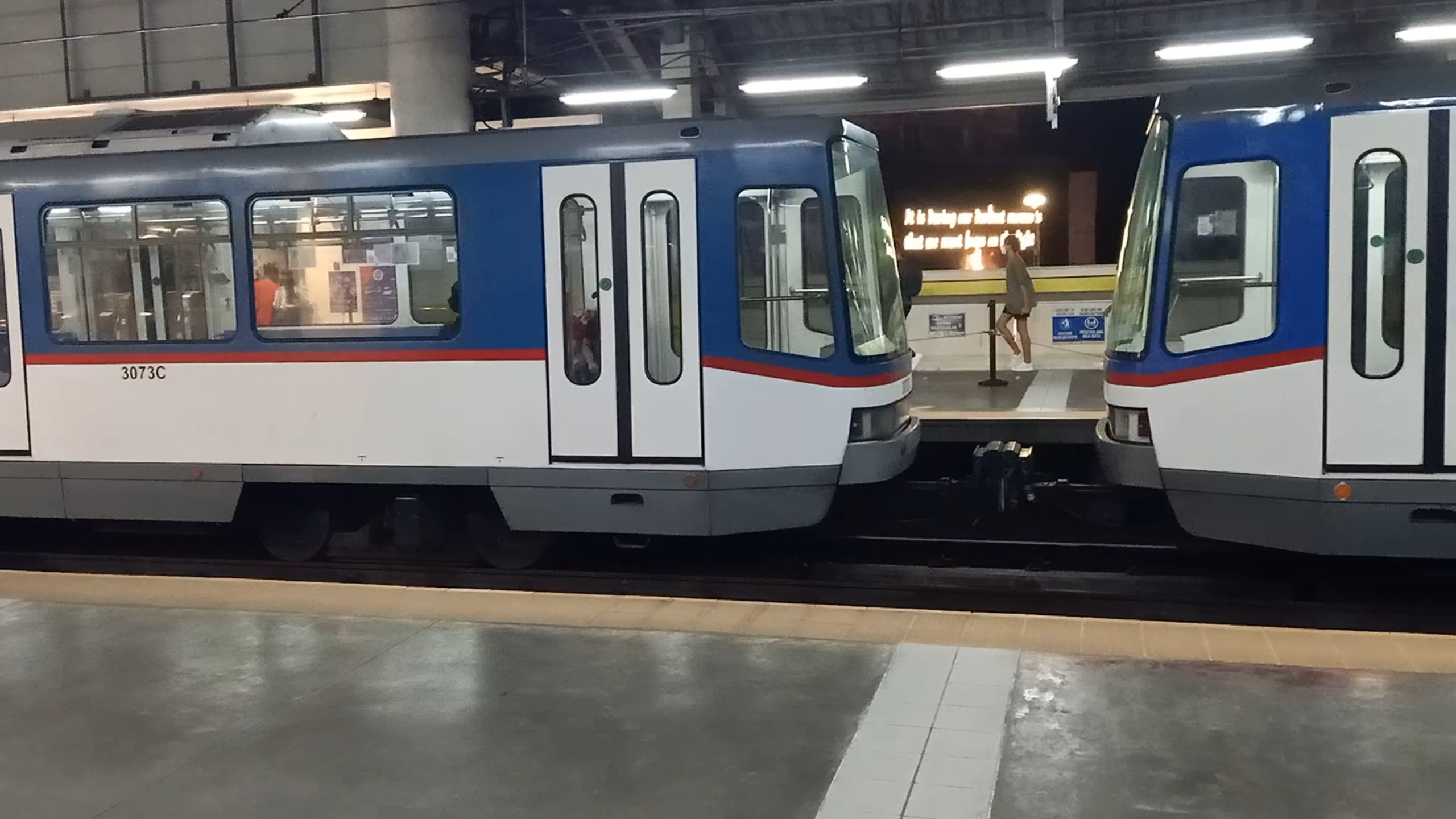
Train cars of the 3000 class with a BURI-refurbished light rail vehicle on the left (December 2021)

In 2016, Busan Universal Rail, Inc. (BURI) initiated the second overhaul of the trains. Forty-three light rail vehicles were to be overhauled as part of its three-year maintenance contract with the Department of Transportation and Communications (DOTC; later the Department of Transportation [DOTr]). The refurbished cars underwent a body repaint and installation of new air-conditioning units from Thermo King. However, DOTr terminated its contract with BURI on November 6, 2017, with only three vehicles refurbished.

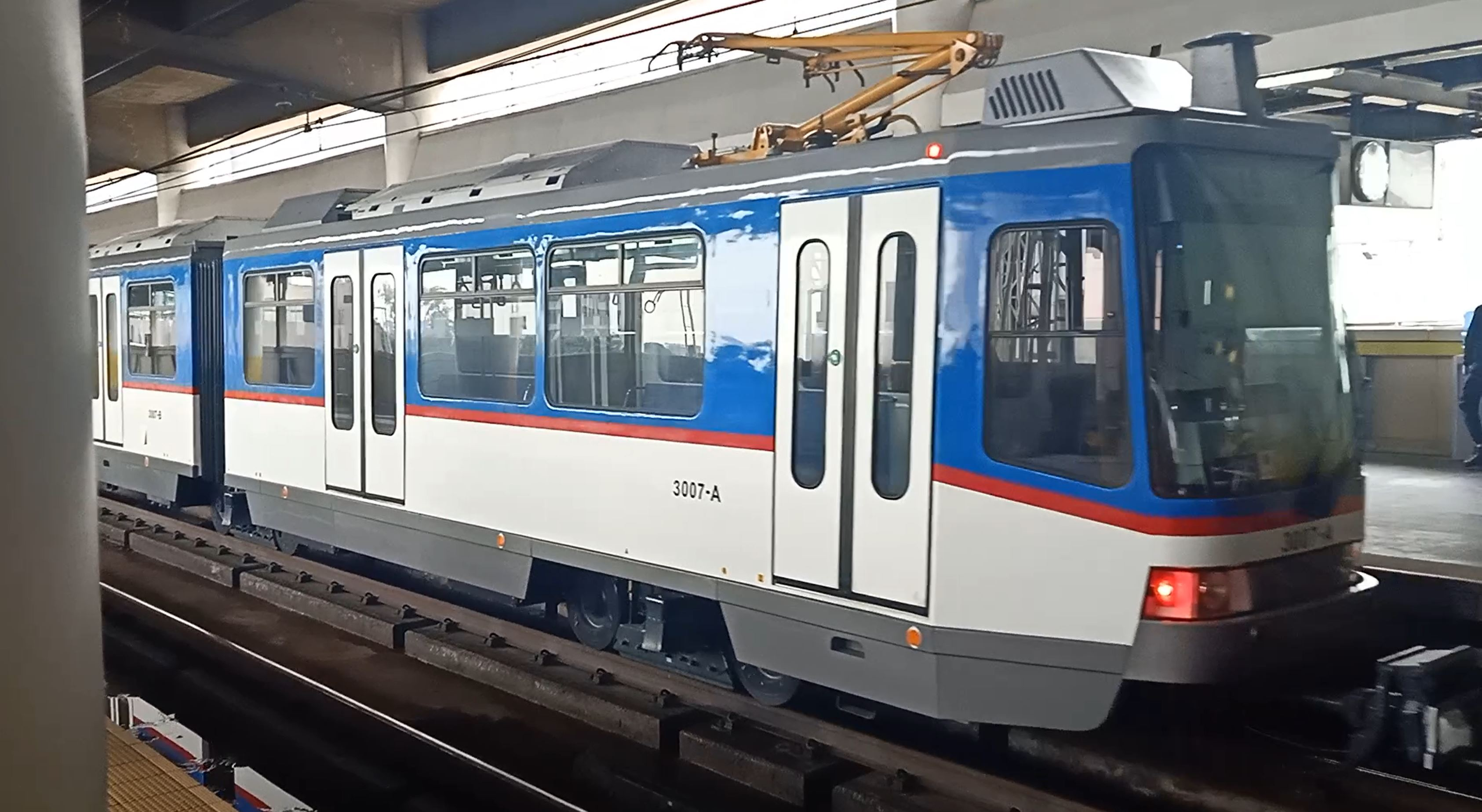
A 3000 class train car after its second refurbishment by Sumitomo (November 2021)

On May 1, 2019, Sumitomo returned as maintenance provider and continued the second refurbishment of the trains. The contractual scope was expanded to cover all 72 LRVs. It consists of the installation of new choppers, traction motors, wheels, pantographs, new air conditioning units from Thermo King; (Note: A replacement program for the air conditioning units began as early as 2018. The program was completed on June 18, 2021, just as the trains were being refurbished one by one.) the repainting of the train's exteriors and interiors; and the fitting of new lighting installations throughout the trains. SKD TRADE, a.s., the successor company to ČKD Tatra, (Note: As stated in this reference:) also supplied new tachographs, axles, and bogies, as well as spare parts for the interior, pantographs, couplers, and resistors.

The first overhauled train was deployed in mid-2019. On October 29, 2020, a newly overhauled train underwent a test run at a speed of 50 km/h (31 mph); it was put to service on November 5. Refurbishment was completed on February 2, 2023, three months ahead of schedule.

=== Four-car operations ===
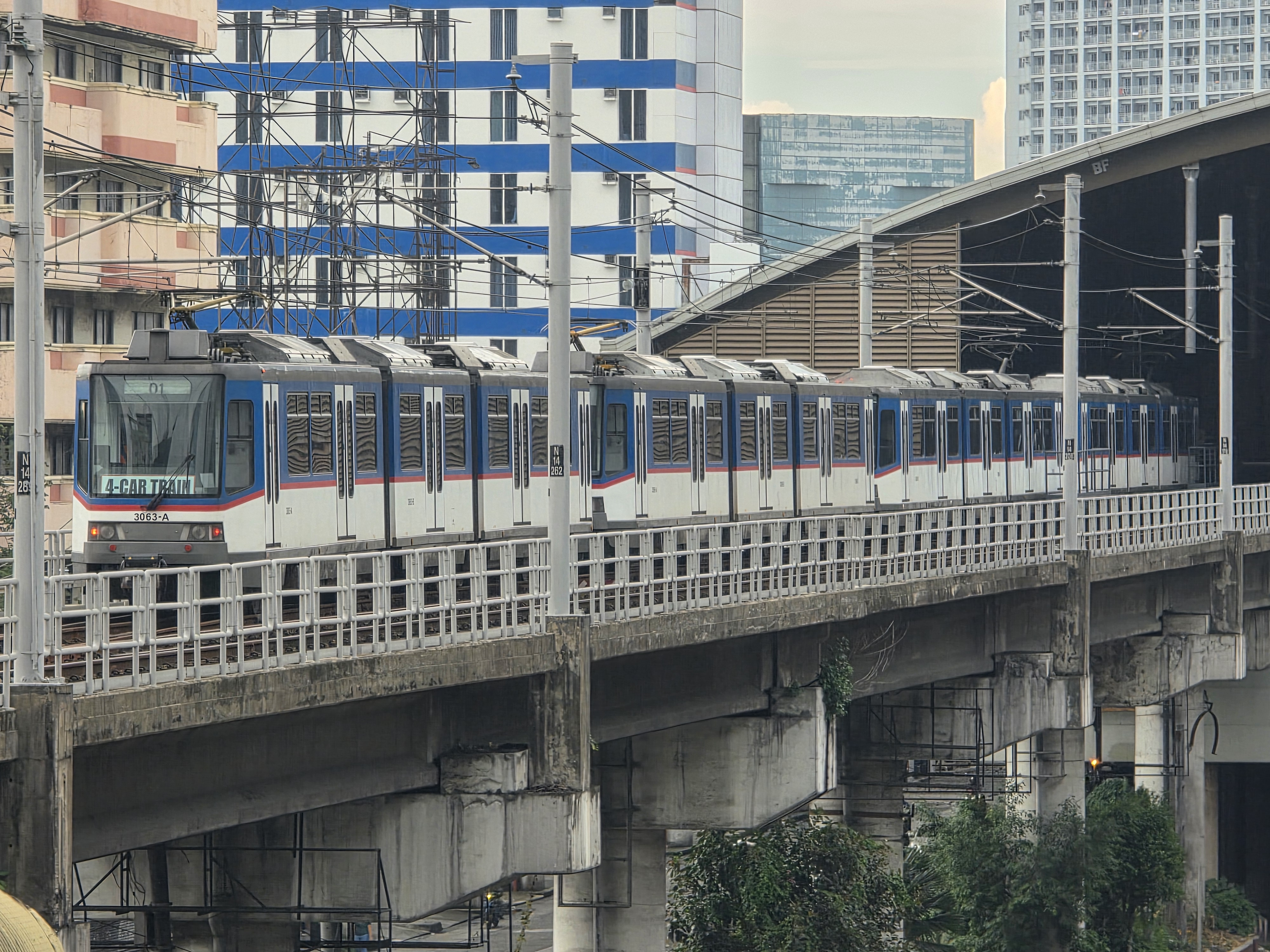
A four-car RT8D5M train at the turnback siding of North Avenue station

Plans for four-car operations were first laid in 2016, adding an additional car from the current three. Although MRT-3's 130-meter (430 ft) stations are designed for four-car trains, the pocket track near Taft Avenue station was too short for safe four-car operations.

After the completion of the line's rehabilitation in late 2021, the DOTr tested a four-car 3000 class trainset on the mainline on March 9, 2022. The first two four-car trainsets were deployed on March 28, while a third trainset was rolled out on April 18. Although full conversion was initially planned to be achieved by 2023, all trains soon reverted to the existing 3-car configuration.

In February 2025, the DOTr planned to redeploy four-car trainsets once the construction of the extended Taft Avenue pocket track would be completed in June. In the aftermath of the line's annual maintenance shutdown during Holy Week, four-car operations returned on April 21 (Easter Monday), two months ahead of schedule, with an initial three sets deployed during the weekday peak hours.

On October 17, 2025, the DOTr increased the number of four-car trainsets to six to further reduce passenger congestion at stations. On October 18, it extended its deployment to weekends.

== Design ==
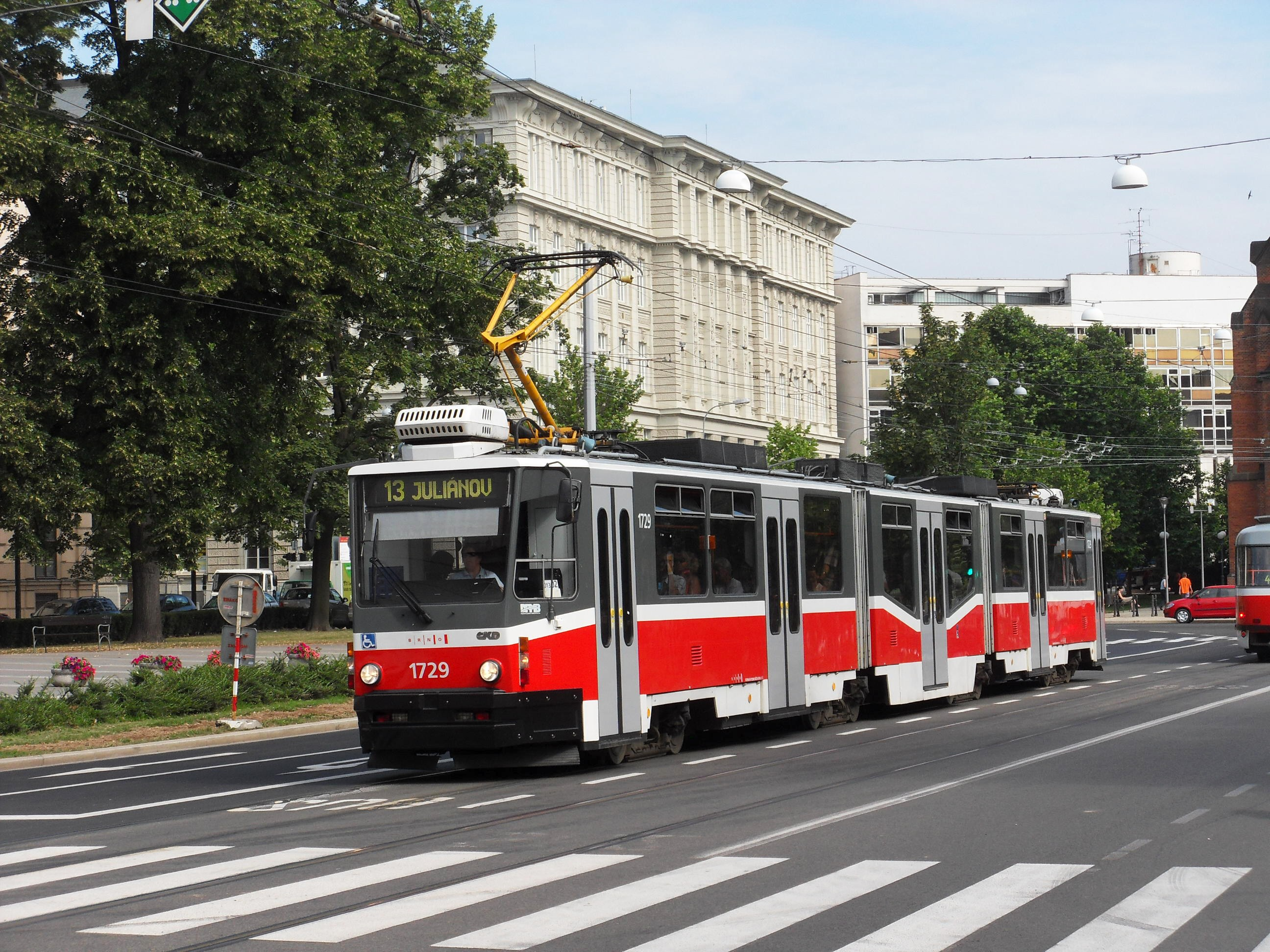
The RT8D5M was a development of the Tatra KT8D5; its doors and electrical systems were largely based on the newer KT8D5N (pictured above).

The LRV design is a one-way eight-axle motorized car consisting of three articulated cars, which are connected to each other by the joint and the cover. The RT8D5M operates as built on the high-speed city rail system with high platforms and in tropical conditions.

=== Car body ===
The car body is made of low-alloy high-tensile steel, while the ceiling is made of aluminum sheets.

Unlike the prototype 0029, these cars have rounded "foreheads" or beveled large windows at both ends.

The trains wear a livery consisting of royal blue, red, and white. Under the "Metrostar Express" branding, the white portion contains the brand logo and lettering on the sides. However, since 2012, the branding has since been unused. The trains also usually wore wrap ads—unlike the LRTA 1200 class which wear ads as a whole trainset, the 3000 class are seen to wear wrap ads per car.

Each light rail vehicle has three roof-mounted air-conditioning units manufactured by Thermo King. In total, there are nine air-conditioning units in a three-car train set.

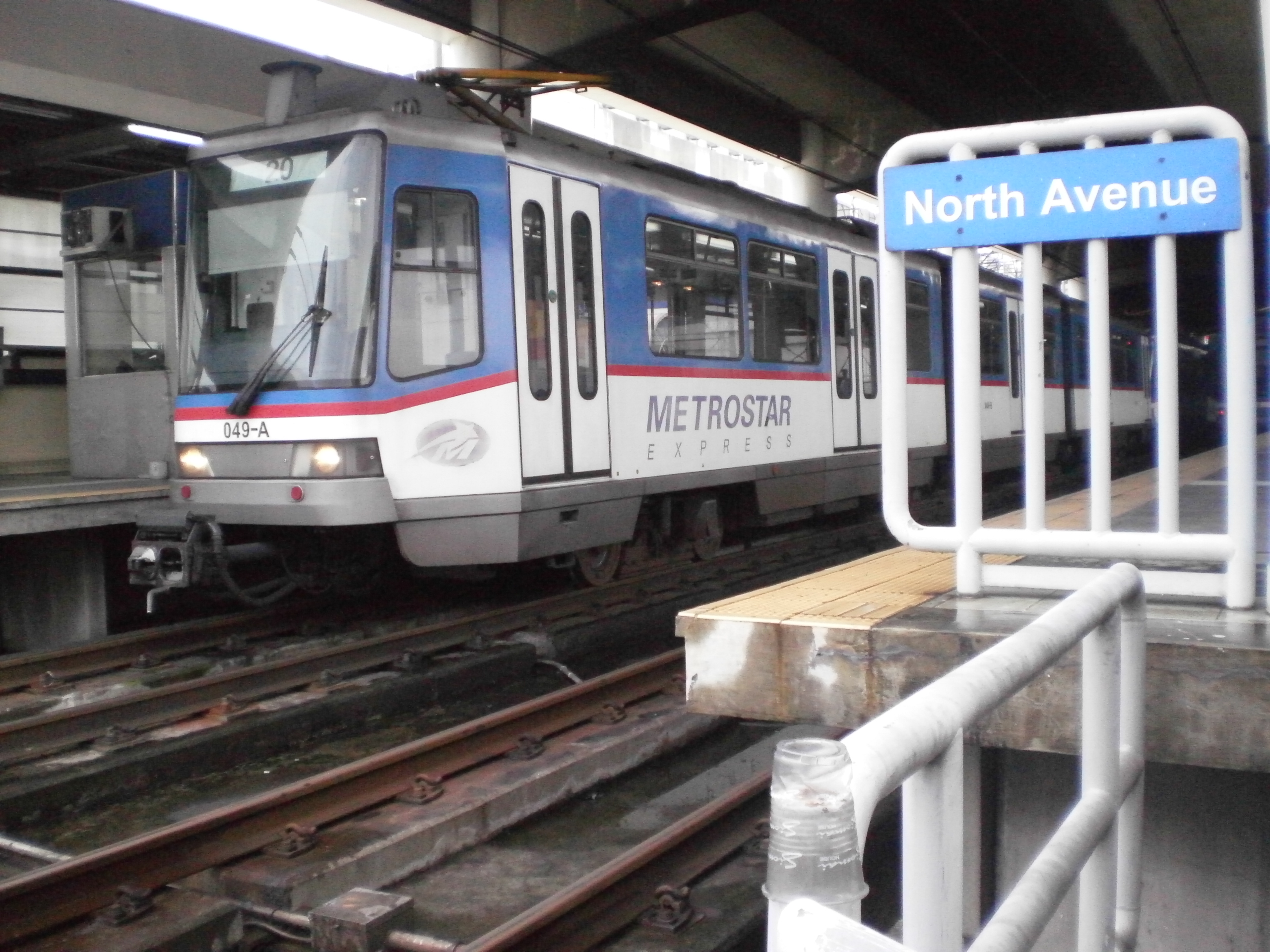
3000 class train with the Metrostar Express branding in 2011

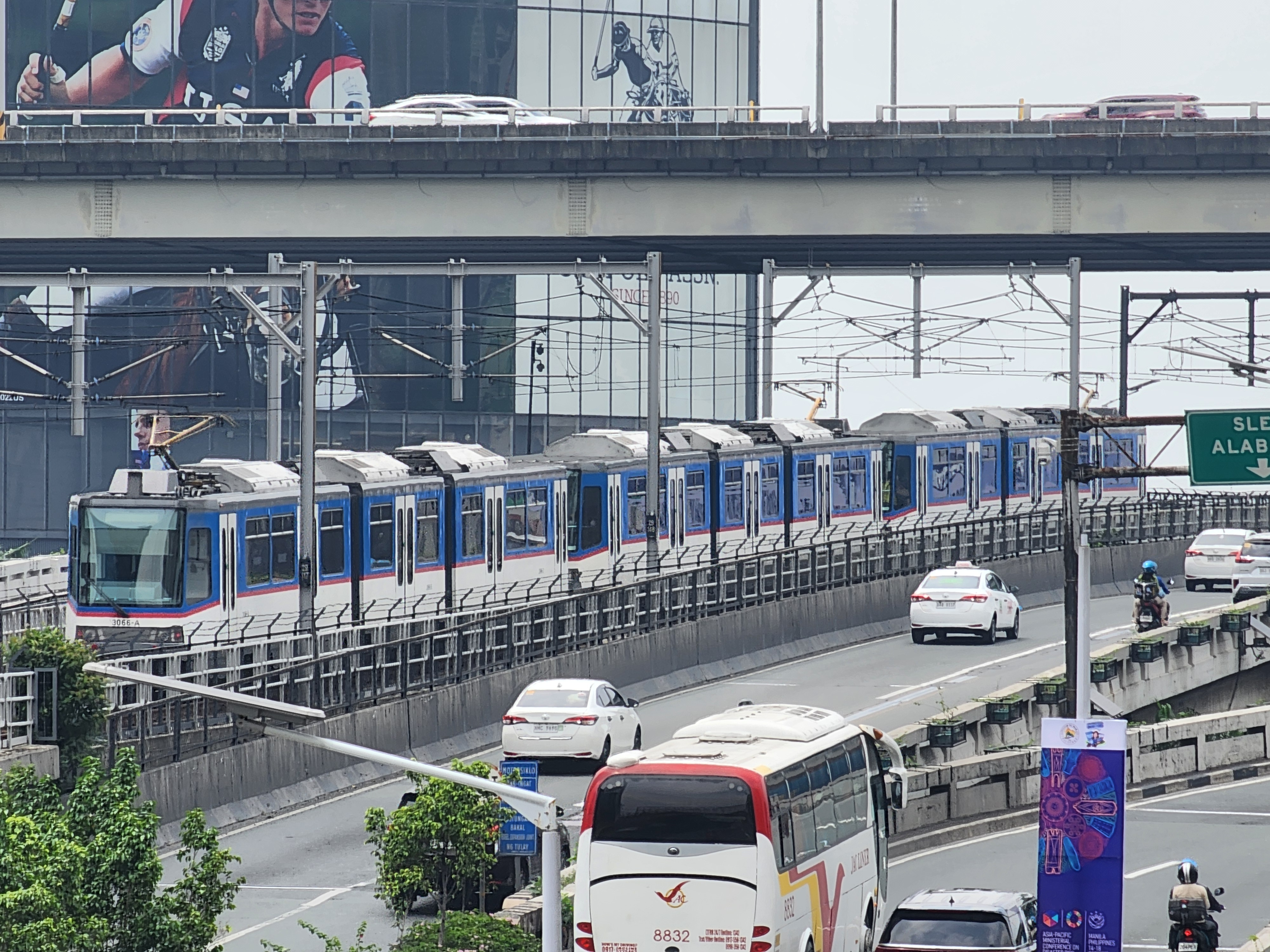
A 3000 class train near Magallanes station

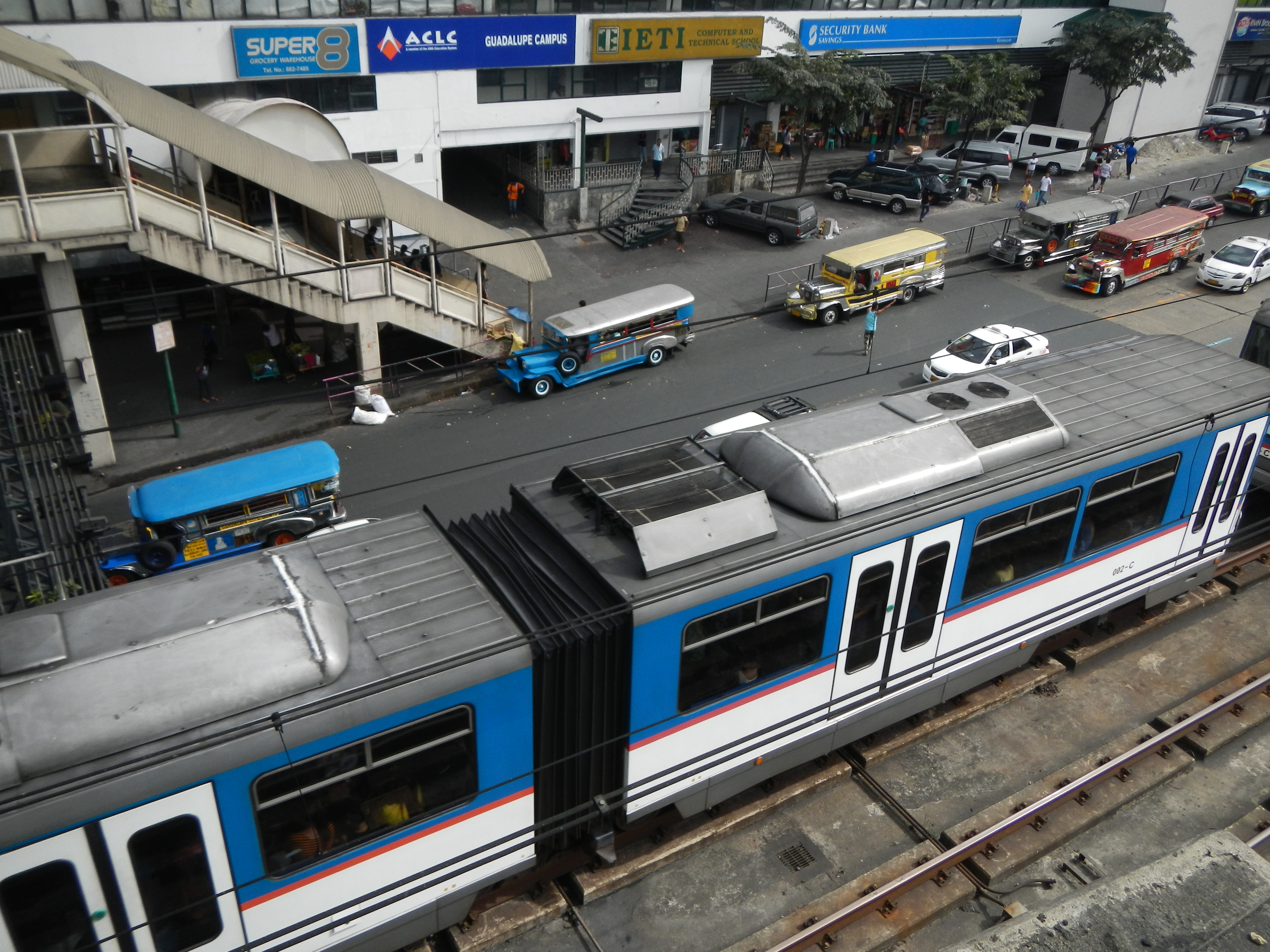
Roof with old air-conditioning units

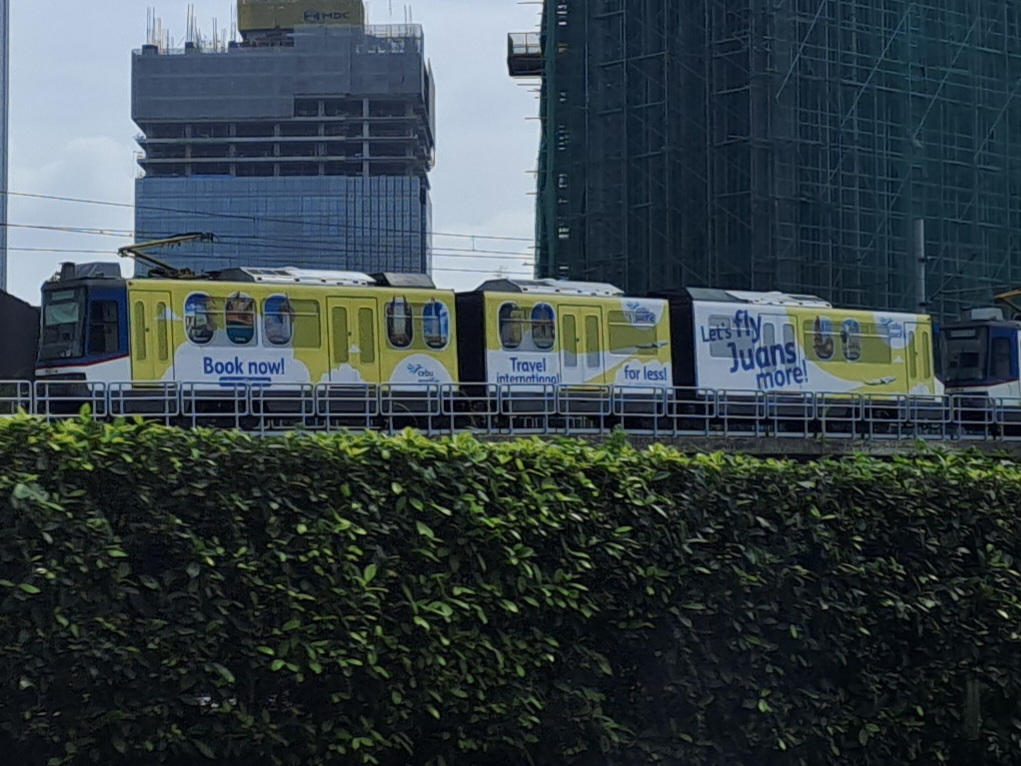
A 3000 class LRV with Cebu Pacific wrap advertising (2022)

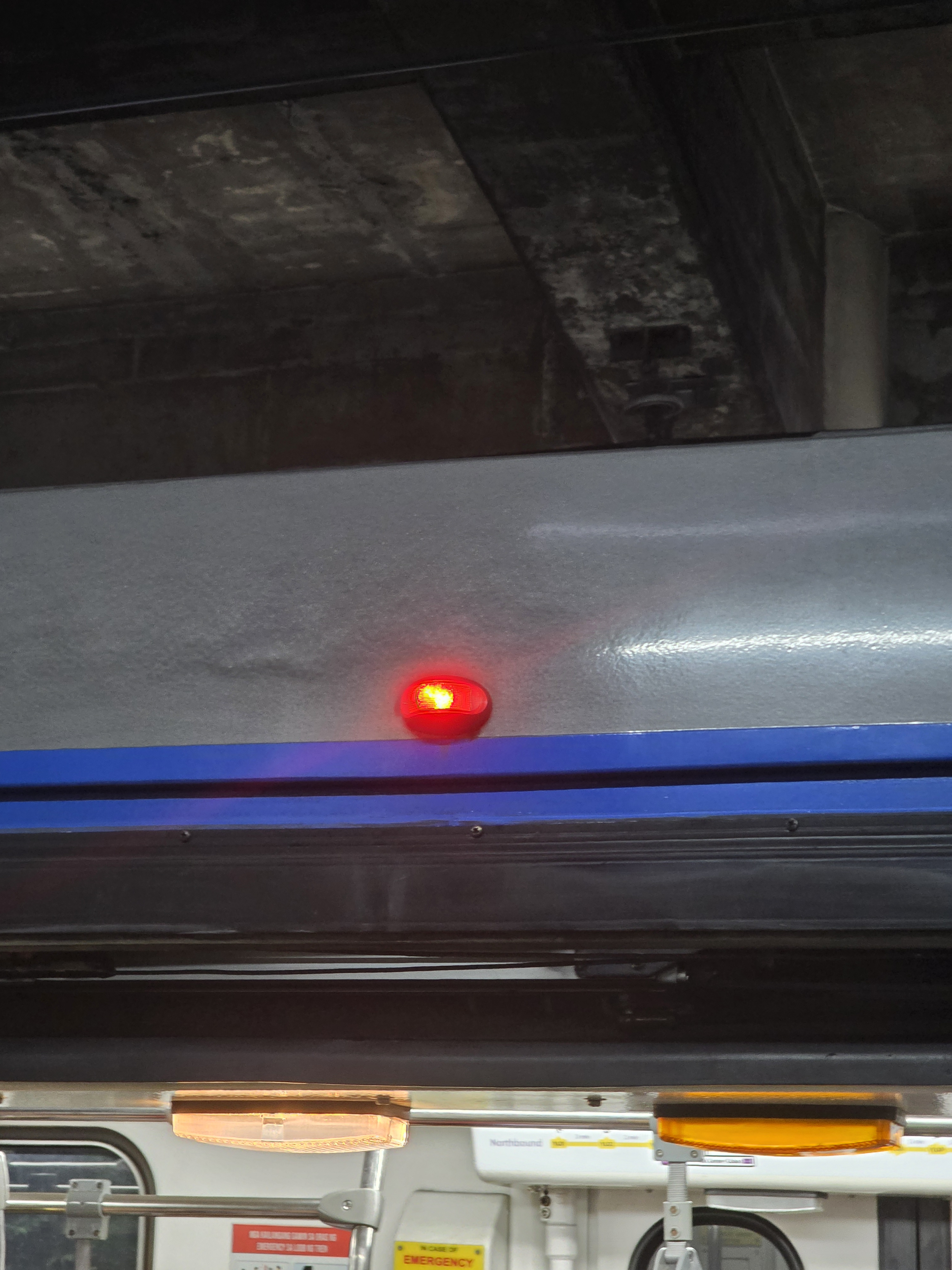
Exterior door lights were installed in some LRVs.

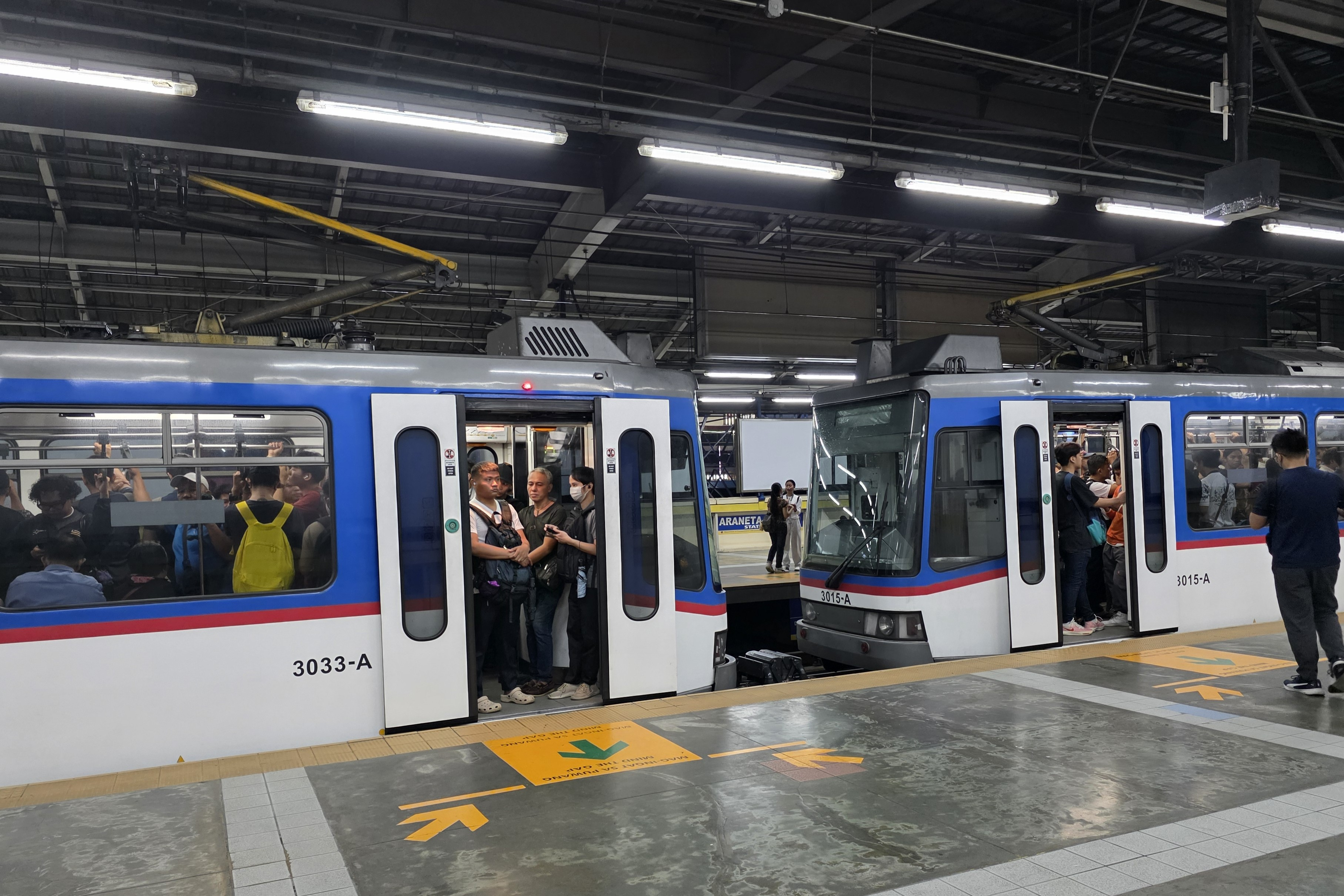
In a four-car train, driver cabs may be coupled facing each other.

=== Interior ===
Each train car has a capacity of 74 seated and 320 standing passengers. Under crush loading conditions, each car can carry 394 commuters. A 3-car trainset can carry 1,182 passengers. Each train car consists of longitudinal bench seating and a PWD open space for wheelchairs and strollers located at one end of each car.

Each car has five double leaf, electronically operated, plug-sliding doors. The three center doors have an open width of 1,255 mm (4 ft 1.4 in) while the two end doors at 861 mm (2 ft 9.9 in). The doors have a height of 1,900 mm (6 ft 3 in).

The Passenger Assist Railway Display System (PARDS), a passenger information system powered by LCD screens installed near the ceiling of the train that shows news, advertisements, current train location, arrivals and station layouts, were installed inside the trains from 2019 to 2020.

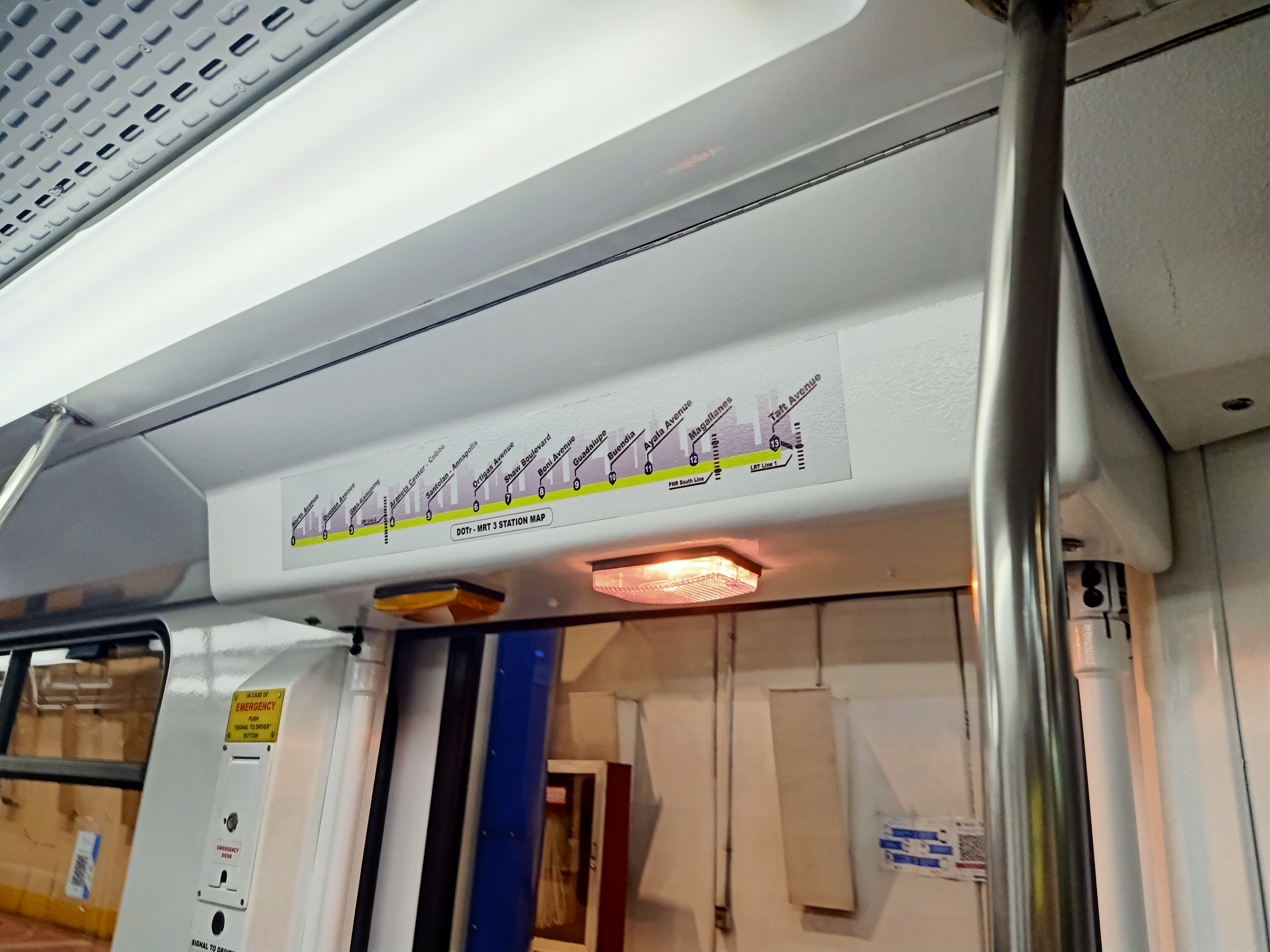
Line map of the MRT-3 (2017 version) above the doors with two mounted lights.

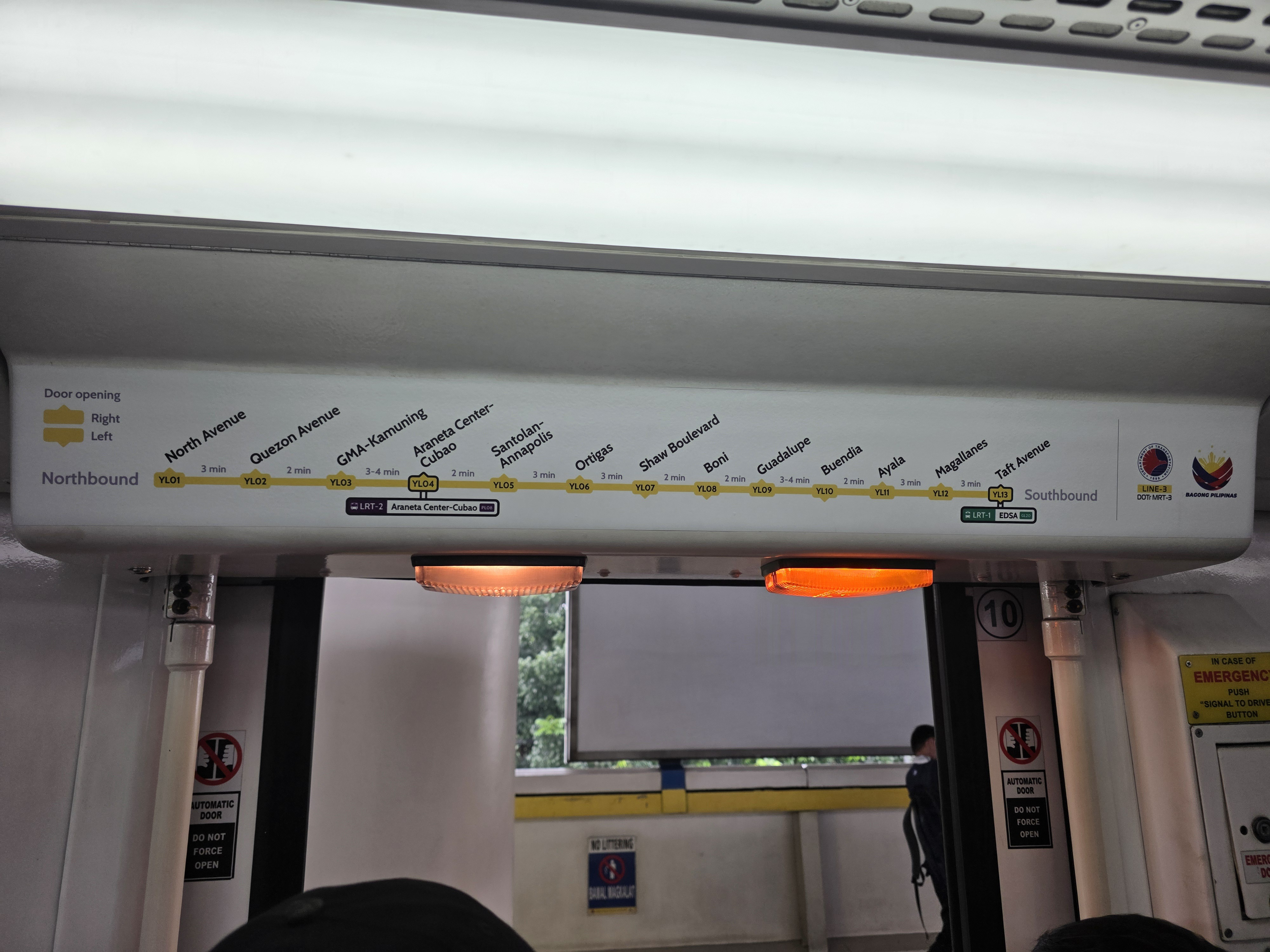
New version of the line map (2025)

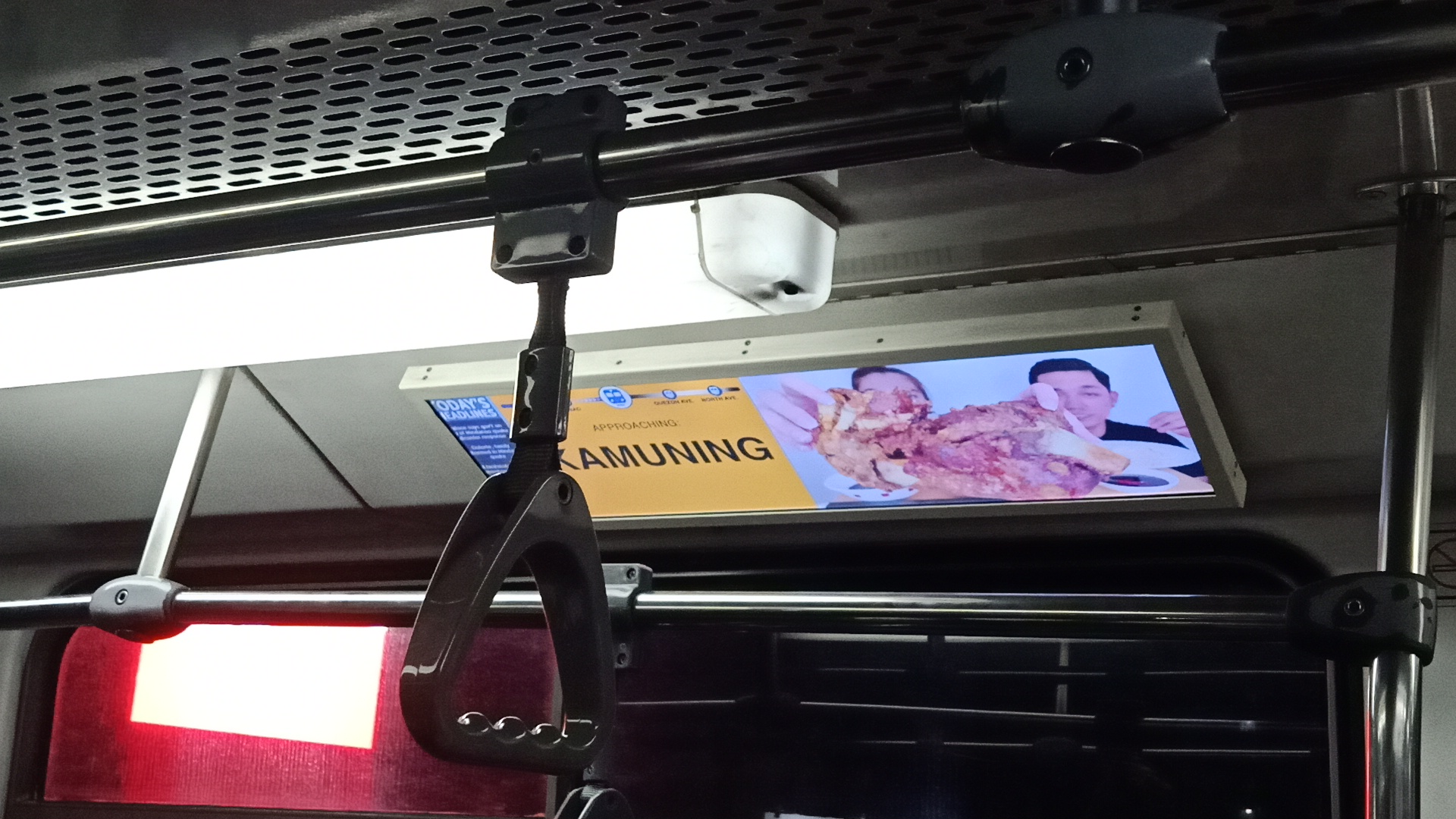
The Passenger Assist Railway Display System LCD monitor screen inside the 3000 class.

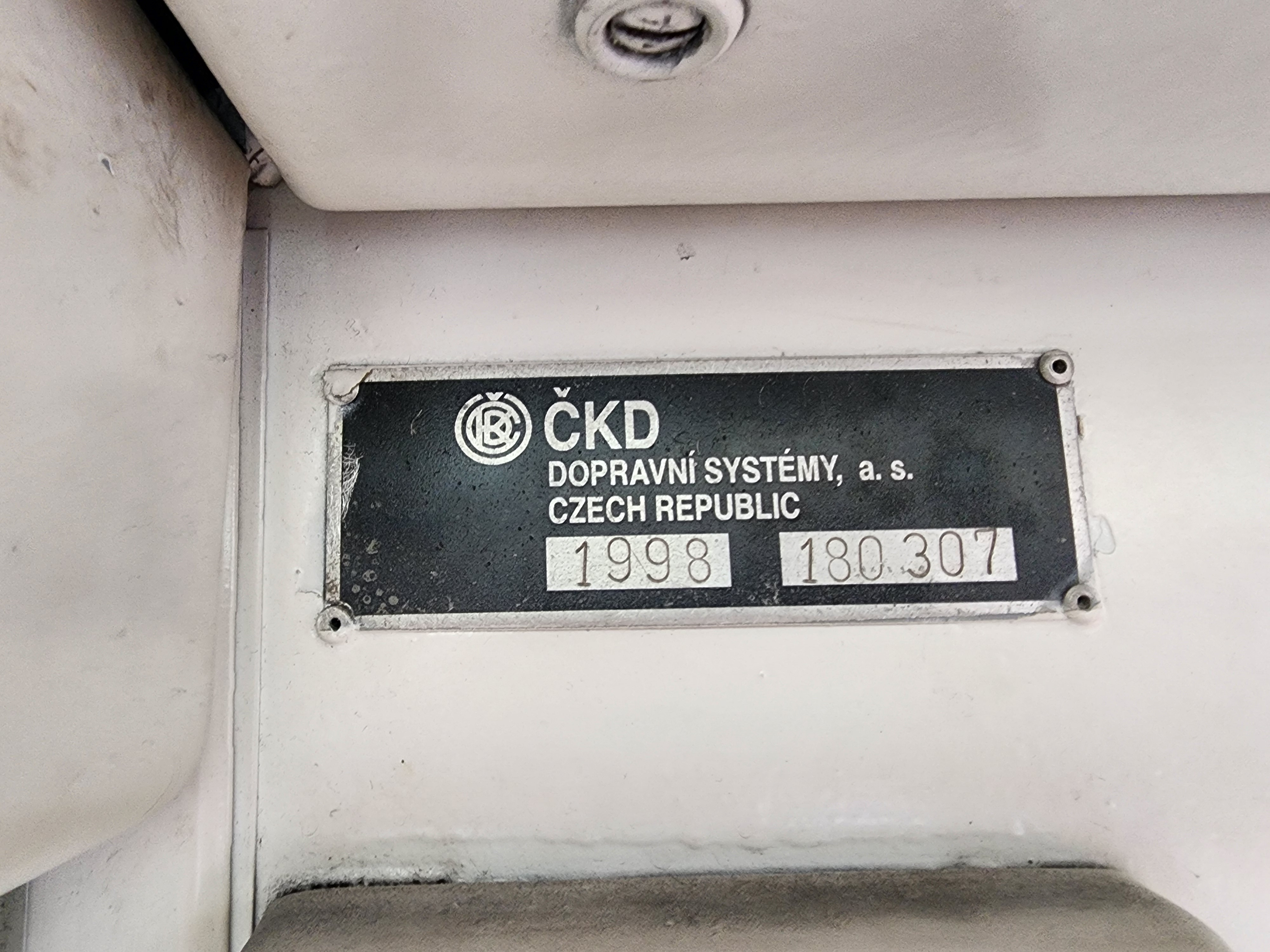
Manufacturer's plate

=== Mechanical ===
Each LRV has inside-frame bogies, consisting of four motorized bogies. The primary suspension is a steel spring and the secondary suspension is a wound-up steel spring. Scharfenberg couplers are present in the ends of the light rail vehicles.

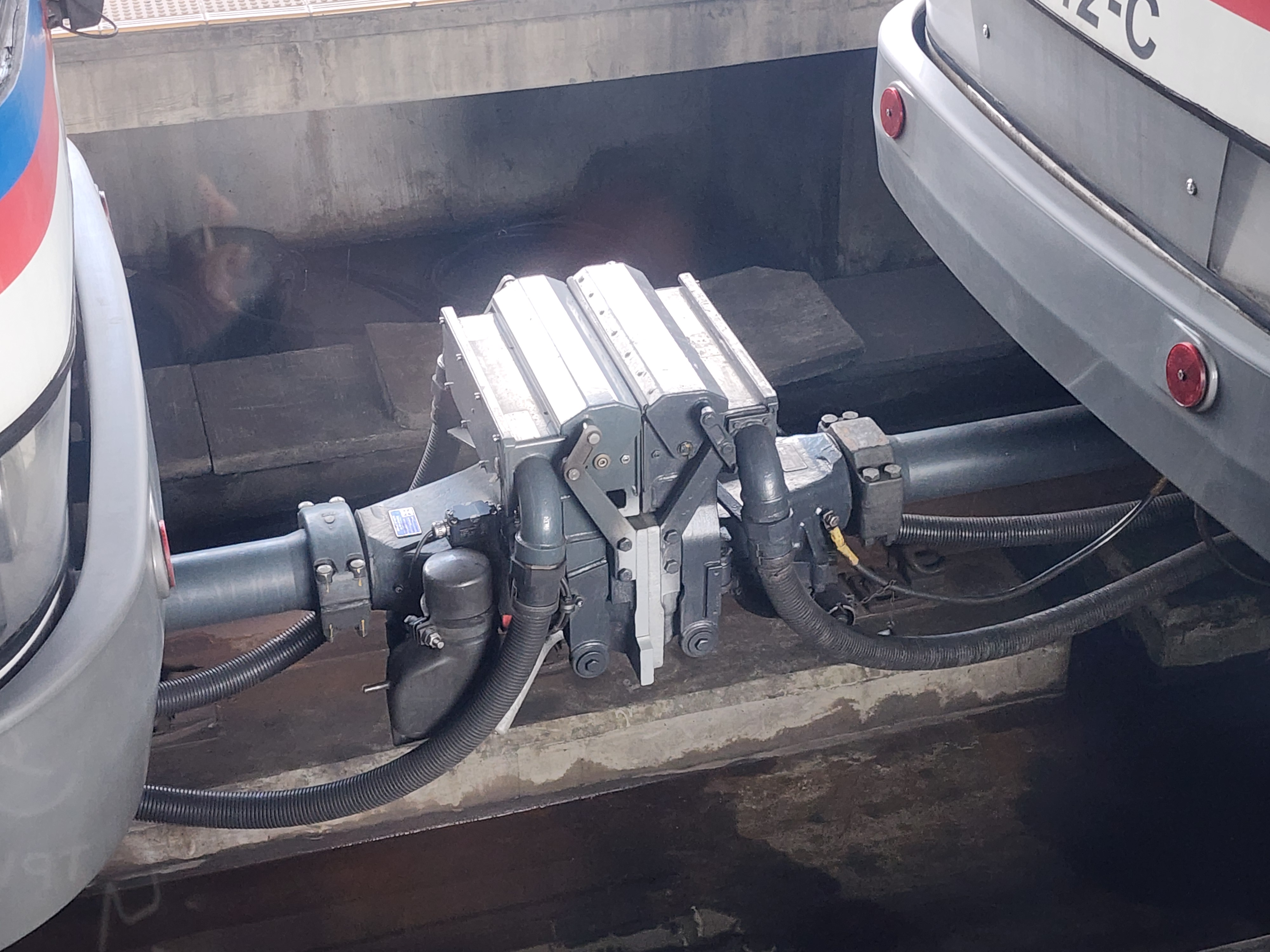
Scharfenberg couplers

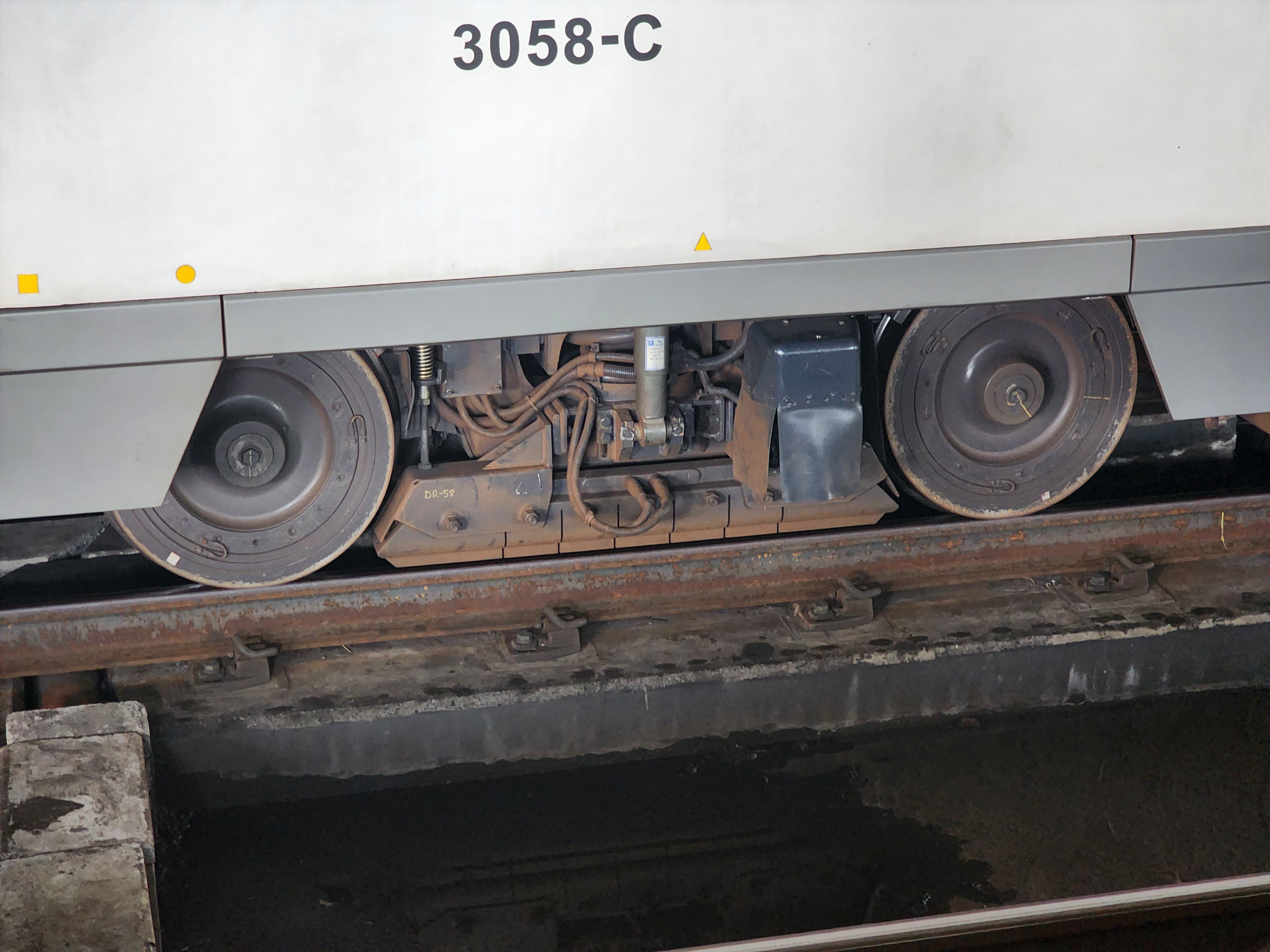
Motorized bogie

=== Electrical ===
The electrical and traction systems of the RT8D5M trains are supplied by ČKD Trakce. The propulsion is controlled by choppers with IGBT thyristors. The traction motors consist of eight DC series-wound/wave armature winding self ventilated motors. The IEC 349-compliant traction motors have a Class H insulation class for the rotor and a Class F insulation class for the stator. Each motor has a power output of 64.5 kilowatts (86.5 horsepower), and are rated for 375 volts, a current of 190 amps, and a speed of 1946 revolutions per minute (rpm) with a maximum speed of 4350 rpm.

Auxiliary power is sourced from 480-volt AC static converters and two 24-volt DC batteries.

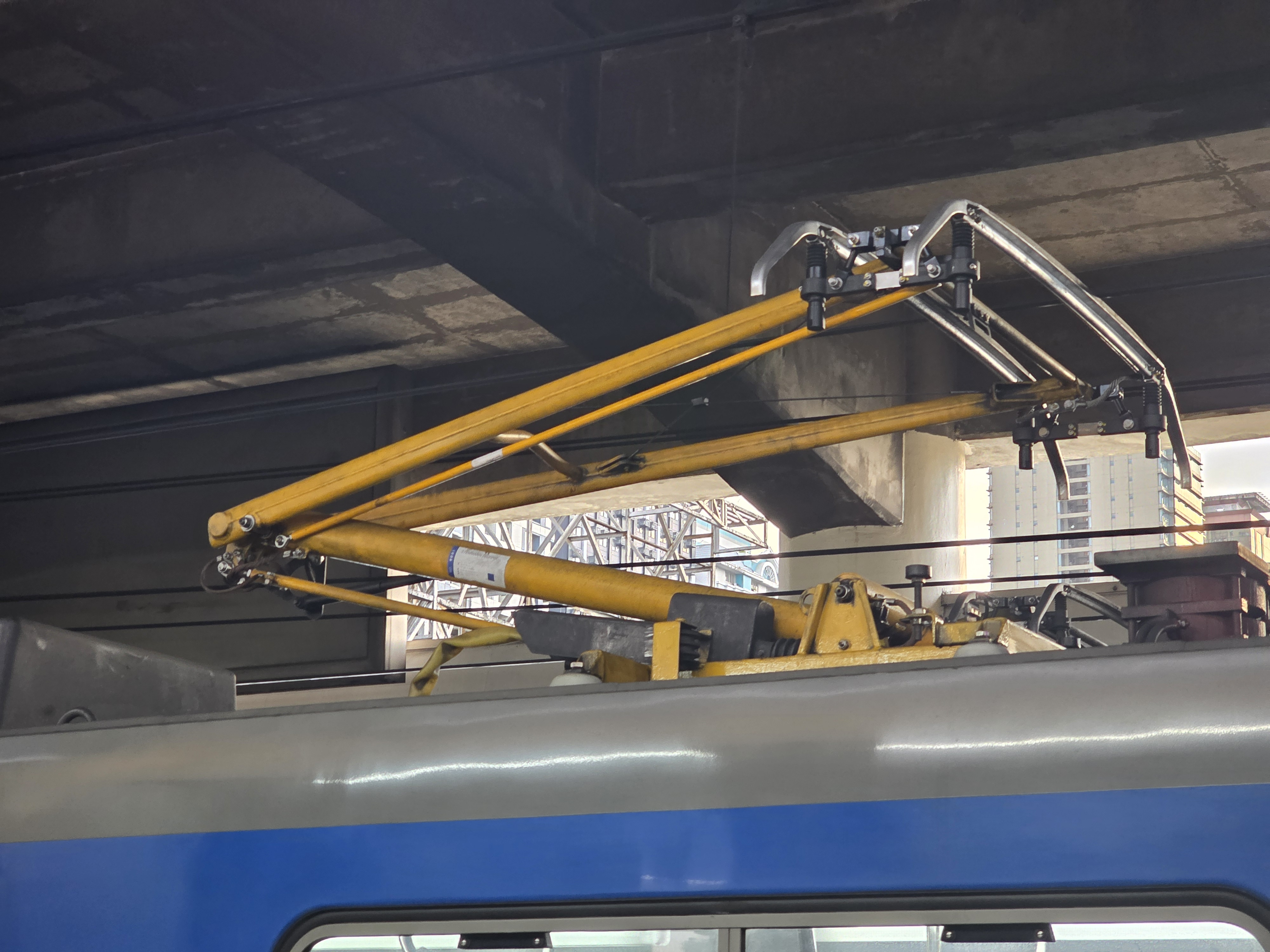
Single-arm pantograph by Faiveley Transport

=== Signaling and safety equipment ===
The trains are equipped with the EBICAB 900 Automatic Train Protection (ATP) system. Some onboard signaling equipment consist of vehicle logic units (VLUs), driver panels, and antennas. The original VLUs were manufactured by Bombardier Transportation (acquired by Alstom in 2021). The VLUs are the primary automatic safety devices for the trains.

In 2017, it was revealed that the original VLUs were stolen and replaced with unauthorized parts. An audit report by Bombardier Transportation showed that 99% of the trains were using fake parts. According to the inventory conducted in all cars, the other cars were equipped with ABB, ABB Daimler-Benz or DaimlerChrysler-branded VLUs.

The EBICAB 900 ATP system is integrated with the Alstom CITYFLO 250 signaling solution.

== Train formation ==
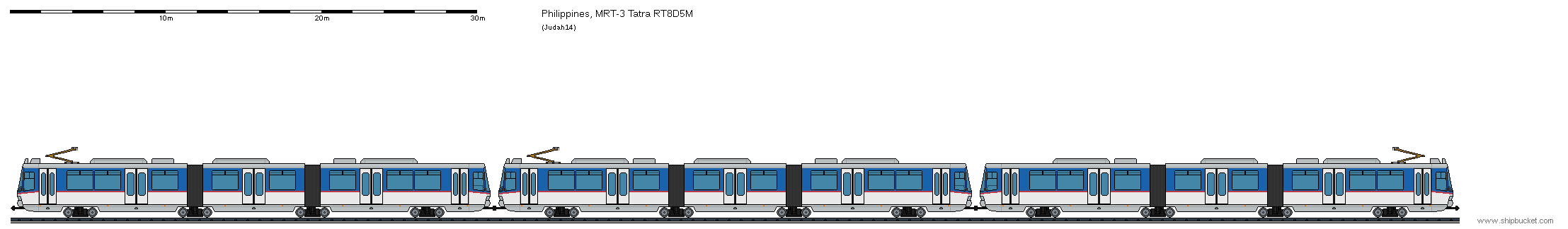
A scale model drawing of the MRTC 3000 class in a 3-car formation

Each unidirectional light rail vehicle consists of three articulated sections. These are operated bidirectionally in sets of three or four.

Cars of 3000 class
Car designation		A-car	B-car	C-car
Control cab		Yes	No	No
Motor		Yes	Yes	Yes
Pantograph		Yes	No	No
Car length	m	31.72		
Car length	ft in	104 ft 13/16 in		
Capacity	Seated	74		
Capacity	Standing	320		
Capacity	Total	394		

== Incidents ==
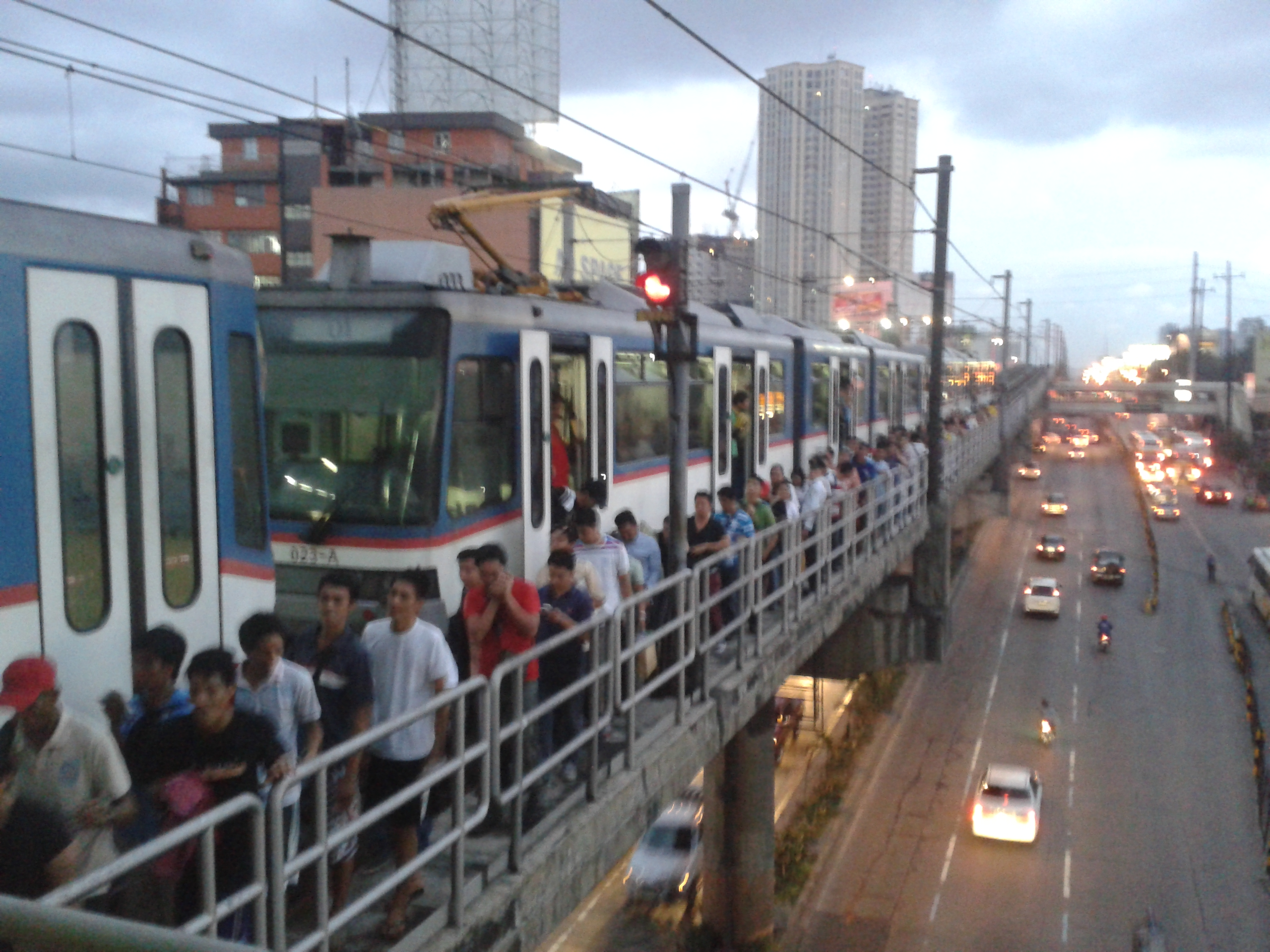
Passengers unloading from a 3000 class train in 2014 due to a service incident.

- On November 3, 2012, a train from the Araneta Center-Cubao Station caught fire as it approached GMA-Kamuning Station, causing passengers to scramble to the exits, and having two women injured. The train caught fire due to electrical short-circuit technical failure.
- On March 26, 2014, at 10:50 am, a southbound train at Guadalupe Station suddenly stopped due to the train driver not observing the red light status at the Guadalupe Station and accelerated southbound without getting prior clearance from the Control Center, causing the automatic train protection system to activate the emergency brakes, resulting in 10 injuries.
- On August 13, 2014, a southbound train heading to Taft Avenue station derailed and overshot to the streets. The train first stopped after leaving Magallanes station due to a technical problem. Later on, the train broke down altogether, another train was used to push the stalled train. During this process, however, the first train got detached from the rails and overshot towards Taft Avenue, breaking the concrete barriers and falling to the street below. At least 38 people were injured. The accident was blamed on 2 train drivers and 2 control personnel for failing to follow the proper coordination procedures and protocol. The A and B sections of the involved train car were loaded sideways onto two flatbed trucks, while the C section of the car was towed to the depot using a hi-rail truck. The train car is still stored at the line's depot in North Avenue as of June 2020. There are currently no news about actions to be taken at the damaged trainset (LRV no. 003), and was noticeably excluded from subsequent train refurbishments.
- On September 2, 2014, a train continued with one of its doors left open after a train door failed to close at the Guadalupe station. The passengers were then evacuated after the train arrived at Boni station.
- On September 18, 2017, at 6:00 am, a seat inside 3000 class LRV no. 3066 (then numbered 066) caught fire at the Santolan-Annapolis station with no injuries reported.
- On November 16, 2017, at 11:30 am, at least 140 passengers were evacuated from a "detached train" coach between the railway lines of Buendia and Ayala Avenue Stations.
- On January 26, 2018, a train caught fire between the Araneta Center-Cubao and GMA-Kamuning stations. Partial operations were implemented, and the situation normalized at 2:46 pm.
- On August 7, 2018, an aircon leak caused "rain" inside a train and caused passengers inside to open their umbrellas. The train was removed from service to fix the air conditioning unit and the train involved in the incident returned to service the following day.
- On November 4, 2019, at 4:08 pm, a train suddenly emitted smoke while on the northbound track of the line. Around 530 passengers were unloaded. Around two hours after the incident, the operation of the line was back to normal. The fire was caused by a short-circuit in the traction motor.
- On May 12, 2021, 3000 class LRV 3015 (then numbered 015) was vandalized by an unidentified culprit near Taft Avenue station. Investigations were conducted and initial reports state that the culprit had cut the perimeter fence near Taft Avenue station, which may have caused the vandalism. The vandalized train was cleaned and returned to service on May 18, 2021.
- On October 9, 2021, at 9:12 p.m., 3000 class LRV 3032 (then numbered 032) caught fire near the Guadalupe station. A provisional service was implemented between North Avenue and Shaw Boulevard station, and the site of the incident was declared fire out at 9:51 p.m. As a result of the incident, 8 passengers sustained minor injuries. Normal operations resumed the following day.
- On November 21, 2021, at 6:51 a.m., a window in a 3000 class LRV was damaged due to a stoning incident, injuring one passenger. The suspect was later identified as a garbage collector and was subsequently arrested and charged.

== See also ==
- MRT Line 3 (Metro Manila)
- Metro Rail Transit Corporation
- MRTC 3100 class
