= Frederick McKinley Jones =

American inventor and entrepreneur (1893–1961)

- Born: May 17, 1893; Cincinnati, Ohio, U.S.
- Died: February 21, 1961 (aged 67); Minneapolis, Minnesota, U.S.

Frederick McKinley Jones (May 17, 1893 – February 21, 1961) was an American inventor, entrepreneur, engineer, winner of the National Medal of Technology, and an inductee of the National Inventors Hall of Fame. He innovated mobile refrigeration technology. Jones received 61 patents, including 40 for refrigeration technology, and also revolutionized the cinema industry by creating a superior sound system for projectors at the time. Jones co-founded Thermo King and also served as a sergeant in World War I. Due to his contributions to refrigeration technology, Jones has been called the "Father of Refrigerated Transportation", and the "King of Cool".

== Early life ==
Jones was born in Cincinnati, Ohio on May 17, 1893, to an Irish father and Black American mother. Little is known about his mother who left his life when Jones was a child. His father, John Jones, was a railroad worker who struggled to raise him on his own. Jones was raised by a Catholic priest, Father Ryan, at a rectory in Cincinnati, Ohio, near Covington. Father Ryan took in Jones around the age of seven, and two years later, John Jones died. Jones left school at age 11 after the sixth grade. He went to nearby Cincinnati, Ohio, working odd jobs including a role as a garage cleaning boy. By age 14, Jones was working as an automobile mechanic and was later named garage foreman. Jones was largely self taught.

== Career ==
=== Mechanical engineer ===
In 1912, Jones moved to Hallock, Minnesota, where he worked as a mechanic on a 50,000-acre (200 km^{2}) farm. The farm was owned by James J. Hill, who was also owner of the Great Northern Railroad. Jones' proximity to Hill and the railroad facilitated his education in electricity and steam locomotive engines. Jones lived there for more than 20 years and would later say in a newspaper article that Hallock was a place "where a man … [was] judged more on his character and ability than on the color of his skin." He was locally known as "Casey" due to a remark by a railroad engineer he met while working at Hill Farm (see also Casey Jones). Jones received his engineering license at age 20. He later upgraded his license to the highest grade.

=== Army service ===
In the U.S. Army, Jones took part in World War I in an all-Black unit until his mechanical skills were spotted, and he was promoted to sergeant working as an electrician and even teaching other soldiers. Jones performed the wiring necessary to equip his camp with electricity, telegraph, and telephone services.

=== Audiovisual work ===
After military service in World War I, Jones returned to Hallock where he worked as a mechanic while learning about electronics. Jones built a transmitter for the town's first radio station. He also invented a device to combine sound with motion pictures. This attracted the attention of local entrepreneur Joseph A. Numero of Minneapolis, Minnesota. Numero owned a company that manufactured audio equipment called Ultraphone Sound Systems Inc. and was later renamed Cinema Supplies Inc. He hired Jones in 1927 as an electrical engineer to improve the audio equipment made by his firm. Jones worked on converting silent movie projectors into audiovisual projectors. He also patented a ticket-dispensing machine for movie theaters.

=== Refrigeration ===
Around 1938, following a request by Numero, Jones began designing the Thermo Control Model A automatic truck refrigeration unit. Jones designed the portable air-cooling unit for trucks carrying perishable food to prevent spoilage. The Model A refrigeration equipment was attached to undercarriages of trucks. Chilled air was transported to the inside of the trailer via refrigerant tubing. Because Model A was too heavy, Jones later developed the Model B, which was smaller and lighter, but not durable. In 1941, Jones completed development of the Model C, which was mounted to the front of the truck, was compact, light, and withstood road travel vibrations. In 1939, Jones filed for a patent for the Model A and received a patent for it on July 12, 1949. Numero sold his movie sound equipment business to RCA and formed a new company in partnership with Jones, the U.S. Thermo Control Company (later the Thermo King Corporation) which became a $3 million business by 1949. Portable cooling units designed by Jones were especially important during World War II, preserving blood, medicine, and food for use at army hospitals and on open battlefields. Model C units were initially manufactured for military use, but following the war the units became available for commercial use as well.

=== Other inventions ===
Jones also developed a portable x-ray machine. He also developed an early prototype of a snowmobile called a "snow machine" that attached skis to the undercarriage of an airplane fuselage and attached a propeller, and a sound track synchroniser (later selling the patent to RCA). An early radio service for local doctors were also counted among his inventions.

== Distinctions and honors ==
During his life, Jones was awarded 61 patents. Forty were for refrigeration equipment, while others were for devices for theater equipment and devices pertaining to gasoline engines.

- In 1944, Jones became the first Black-American to become a member of the American Society of Refrigeration Engineers.
- 1953 Merit Award, Phyllis Wheatley Auxiliary (Phillis Wheatley Club of Cleveland, Ohio), "for outstanding achievements which serve as an inspiration to youth."
- In 1977, he was posthumously inducted into the Minnesota Inventors Hall of Fame.
- In 1991, the National Medal of Technology was awarded to Joseph A. Numero and Frederick M. Jones. President George Bush presented the awards posthumously to their widows at a ceremony in the White House Rose Garden. Jones was the first Black American to receive the award.
- In 1996, the Thermo King Model 'C' refrigeration unit, the world's first front-mount refrigeration unit for mobile trucks, was designated an International Mechanical Engineering Landmark by the American Society of Mechanical Engineers. Jones designed and built the prototype from junkyard salvage. The challenges were to build a structural frame and refrigerant tubing connections that would withstand the constant pounding of road vibrations.
- In 2007, Jones was inducted into the National Inventors Hall of Fame, which honored him as a "Visionary Veteran."
- In the March 2009 issue of Heavy Duty Truck magazine, editor Tom Berg dubbed Jones "The King of Cool", and wrote that his "technological breakthrough redefined the global marketplace, with cultural reverberations felt from the world's largest cities to its most isolated villages."
- In 2015, Jones' achievements were recognized by the creators of a Black heritage-themed playground located in Minneapolis. The playground features train-themed equipment with an educational plaque explaining Jones' mobile refrigeration technology.
- In 2022, several Black-owned breweries honored Jones during Black History Month. They released commemorative beers featuring the likeness of notable figures in Black history, including Jones.

== Death ==
On February 21, 1961, Jones died of lung cancer at age 67 in Minneapolis, Minnesota, predeceasing his wife, Lucille. In an obituary in the Saturday Evening Post, it was said, "Most engineers start at the bottom of a project and work up, but Fred takes a flying leap to the top of the mountain and then backs down, cutting steps for himself and the rest of us as he goes." Jones continued filing for patents almost up until his death, receiving his last patent in February 1960.

== Patents ==
- U.S. patent 2,163,754 was issued on June 27, 1939 – Ticket dispensing machine.
- U.S. patent D132,182 was issued on April 28, 1942 – Design for air conditioning unit.
- U.S. patent 2,336,735 was issued on December 14, 1943 – Removable cooling units for compartments.
- U.S. patent 2,337,164 was issued on December 21, 1943 – Means for automatically stopping and starting gas engines.
- U.S. patent 2,376,968 was issued on May 29, 1945 – Two-cycle gas engine.
- U.S. patent 2,417,253 was issued on March 11, 1947 – Two-cycle gas engine.
- U.S. patent 2,475,841 was issued on July 12, 1949 – Automatic refrigeration system for long-haul trucks.
- U.S. patent 2,475,842 was issued on July 12, 1949 – Starter generator.
- U.S. patent 2,475,843 was issued on July 12, 1949 – Means operated by a starter generator for cooling a gas engine.
- U.S. patent 2,477,377 was issued on July 26, 1949 – Means for thermostatically operating gas engines.
- U.S. patent 2,504,841 was issued on April 18, 1950 – Rotary compressor.
- U.S. patent 2,509,099 was issued on May 23, 1950 – System for controlling operation of refrigeration units.
- U.S. patent D159,209 was issued on July 4, 1950 – Design for air conditioning unit.
- U.S. patent 2,523,273 was issued on September 26, 1950 – Engine actuated ventilating system.
- U.S. patent 2,526,874 was issued on October 24, 1950 – Apparatus for heating or cooling atmosphere within an enclosure.
- U.S. patent 2,535,682 was issued on December 26, 1950 – Prefabricated refrigerator construction.
- U.S. patent 2,581,956 was issued on January 8, 1952 – Refrigeration control device.
- U.S. patent 2,666,298 was issued on January 19, 1954 – Methods and means of defrosting a cold diffuser.
- U.S. patent 2,696,086 was issued on December 7, 1954 – Method and means for air conditioning.
- U.S. patent 2,780,923 was issued on February 12, 1957 – Method and means for preserving perishable foodstuffs in transit.
- U.S. patent 2,850,001 was issued on September 2, 1958 – Control device for internal combustion engine.
- U.S. patent 2,926,005 was issued on February 23, 1960 – Thermostat and temperature control system.
