= Thermo King =

Manufacturer of refrigeration and HVAC systems

- Type: Subsidiary
- Industry: Equipment manufacturing
- Founded: 1938; 88 years ago
- Founder: Joseph A. Numero; Frederick McKinley Jones
- Headquarters: Bloomington, Minnesota
- Products: Transport refrigeration systems
- Parent: Trane Technologies
- Website: thermoking.com

Thermo King is an American manufacturer of transport temperature control systems for refrigerator trucks and trailers, refrigerated containers and refrigerated railway cars along with heating, ventilation and air conditioning systems for bus and passenger rail applications. It is headquartered in the Minneapolis suburb of Bloomington, Minnesota. Thermo King is a subsidiary of Trane Technologies.

== History ==
Joseph "Joe" A. Numero sold his Cinema Supplies Inc. movie sound equipment business to RCA in 1938 and formed a new entity, the U.S. Thermo Control Company (later the Thermo King LLC), in partnership with his engineer, inventor Frederick McKinley Jones. Jones designed a portable air-cooling unit for trucks carrying perishable food, for which they had obtained a patent on July 12, 1940. The company renamed itself Thermo King in 1941.

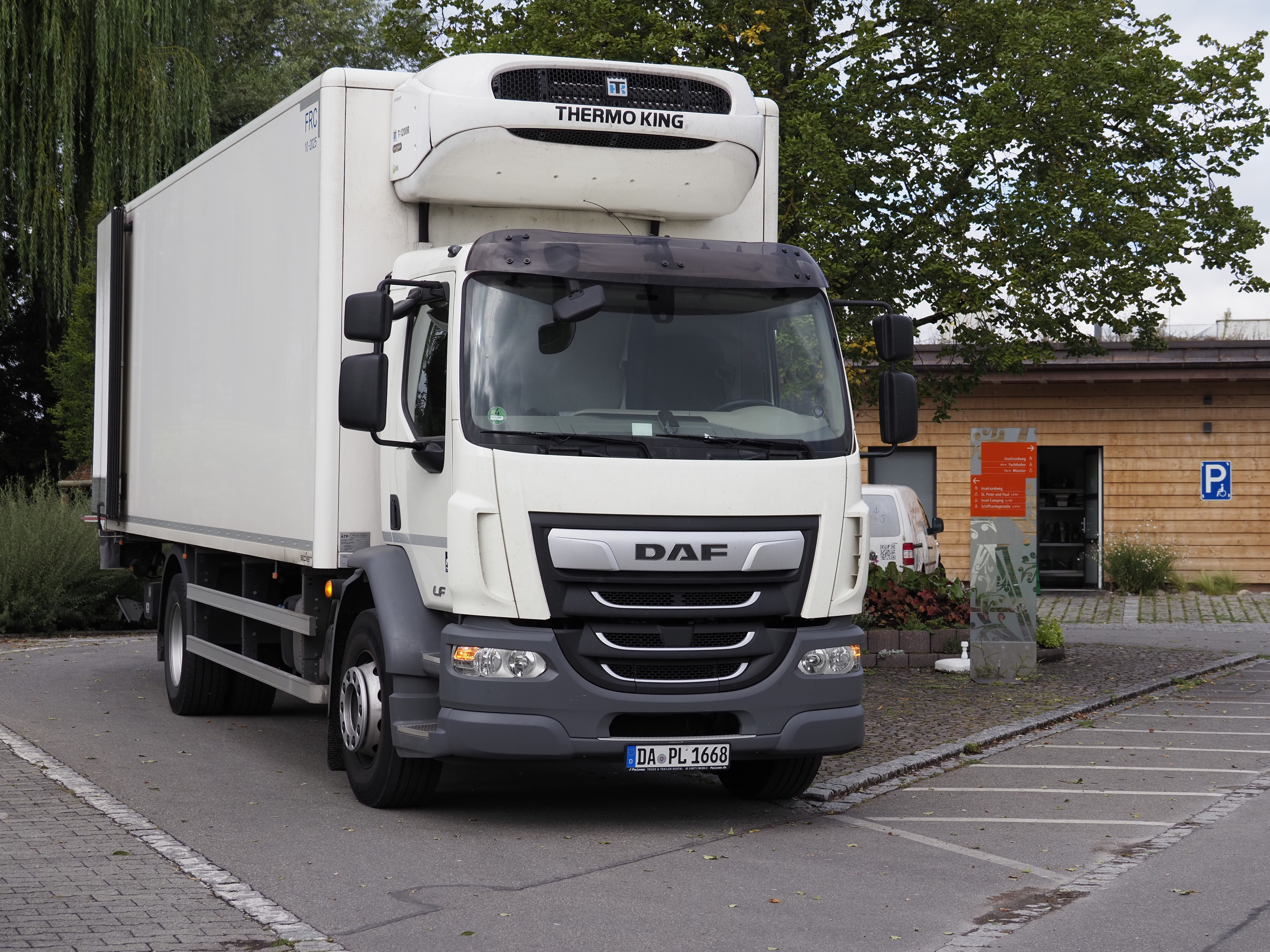
Thermo King refrigeration unit on a DAF refrigerated truck

In 1942, Jones developed the first portable refrigeration units for troops stationed overseas in World War II. Thermo King also introduced the first gasoline-powered mechanical refrigerated boxcars in the 1940s, which reduced shipping costs, making fresh produce more widely available and affordable for the public.

With the introduction of diesel engines in refrigerated units in 1958, engine life would out-perform their gasoline-powered counterparts in terms of longevity. Thermo King was not limited to transport refrigeration products, however. Some of the additional products the company built and sold included milk coolers, golf carts, school desks and shopping carts.

On March 5, 1966, a group of 75 people associated with the company were among the 113 passengers and 11 crew members who died when BOAC Flight 911 crashed near Mount Fuji, Japan. Company executives and their top dealers were on a 14-day company-sponsored tour of Japan and Southeast Asia, which was organized as a reward for sales performance. Thirty years later, the company would suffer a similar tragedy when Jill Watson, daughter of company president James F. Watson, was killed in the crash of TWA Flight 800.

During the 1970s, Thermo King continued to manufacture equipment for the transportation industry. Thermo King Europe opened in Galway, Ireland, and began producing refrigeration units to be sold throughout Europe, Africa, the Middle East, Australia and Asia.

In 1991, the National Medal of Technology was awarded to Joseph A. Numero and Frederick M. Jones. President George Bush presented the awards posthumously to their widows at a ceremony in the White House Rose Garden. Jones was the first African American to receive the award (see Frederick McKinley Jones).

In 1997, Ingersoll Rand acquired Thermo King from Westinghouse for $2.56 billion in cash, 13 times earnings, and added it to its Climate Control Technologies (later Climate Solutions) businesses, alongside Trane and Hussmann. At the time Thermo King controlled close to half the global market for refrigeration equipment.
