= 2016 Philippine presidential election in Cebu =

- May 9, 2016
- Registered: 2,722,288
- Turnout: 84.95%
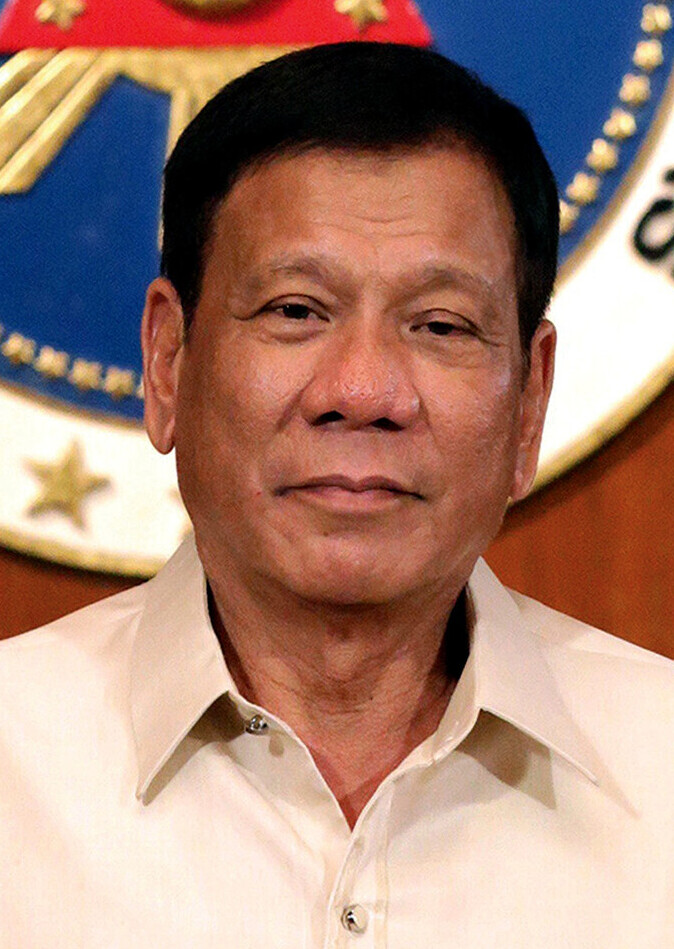

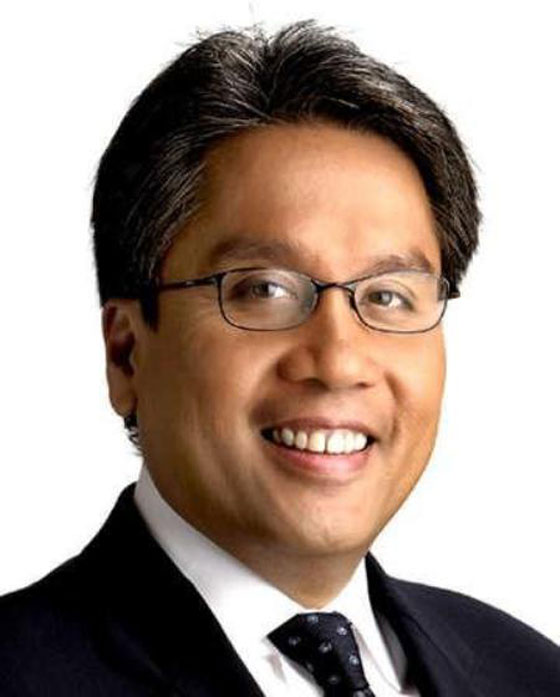

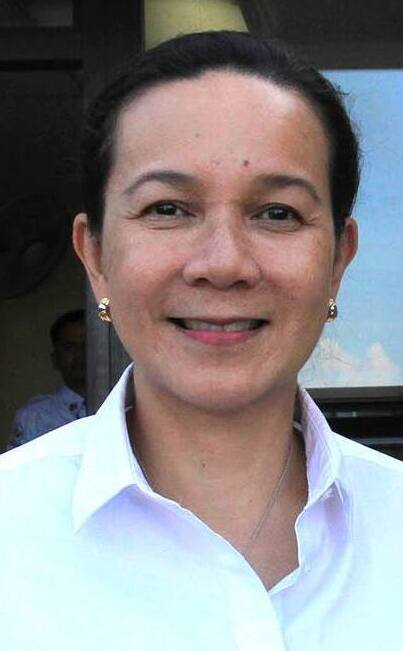
Candidate	Rodrigo Duterte	Mar Roxas	Grace Poe
Party	PDP–Laban	Liberal	Independent
Alliance		KDM	PGP
Running mate	Alan Peter Cayetano	Leni Robredo	Francis Escudero
popular vote	1,235,591	627,639	278,080
Percentage	53.48%	27.17%	12.04%
President before election
Benigno Aquino III
Liberal
Elected President
Rodrigo Duterte
PDP–Laban
- 2016 Philippine vice presidential election in Cebu
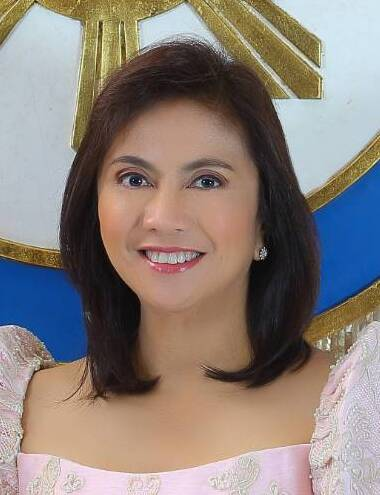

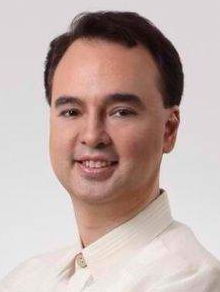

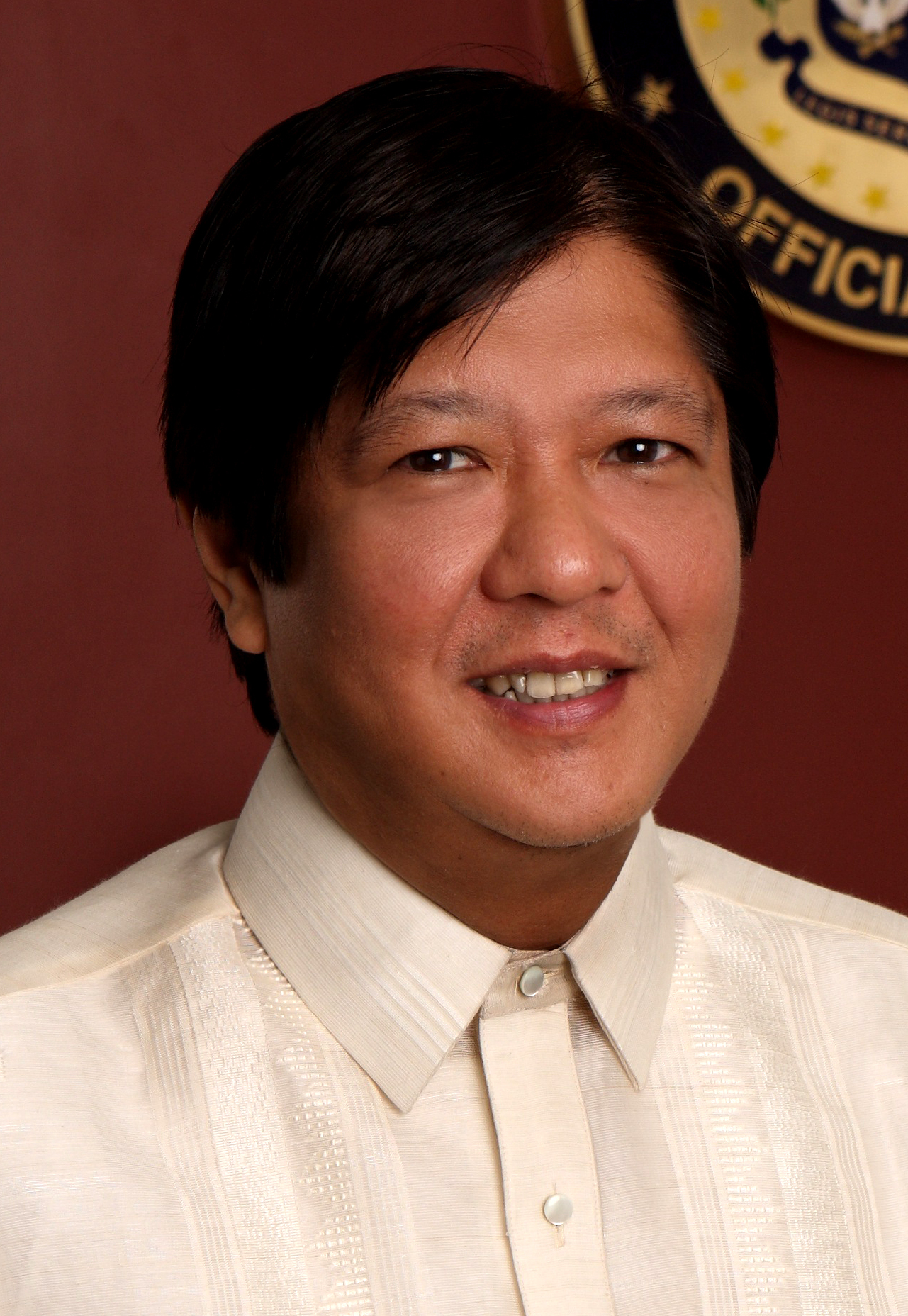
Candidate	Leni Robredo	Alan Peter Cayetano	Bongbong Marcos
Party	Liberal	Independent	Independent
Alliance	KDM
popular vote	875,852	716,443	331,518
Percentage	39.45%	32.27%	14.93%
Vice President before election
Jejomar Binay
UNA
Elected Vice President
Leni Robredo
Liberal

The 2016 Philippine presidential and vice presidential elections in Cebu were held on Monday, May 9, 2016, as part of the 2016 Philippine general election in which all 81 provinces, all 145 cities, and all 1,489 municipalities participated. Voters voted the president and the vice president separately.

Davao City mayor Rodrigo Duterte won the province of Cebu in a landslide against DILG Secretary Mar Roxas, Senator Grace Poe, Vice president Jejomar Binay, and Senator Miriam Defensor Santiago. Duterte also won in a landslide in Cebu City and Lapu-Lapu City.

Camarines Sur representative Leni Robredo also won the province defeating Senators Alan Peter Cayetano, Bongbong Marcos, Francis Escudero, Antonio Trillanes, and Gregorio Honasan. While Robredo won in Lapu-Lapu City, Cayetano narrowly won in Cebu City and Mandaue City.

Cebu is the most vote-rich province during the election with 2,722,288 registered voters.

== Electoral system ==
According to the Constitution of the Philippines, the elections are held every six years after 1992, on the second Monday of May. The incumbent president is term-limited and ineligible for re-election. The incumbent vice president is eligible to run for re-election and may run for two consecutive terms. The plurality voting system is used to determine the winner: the candidate with the highest number of votes, whether or not one has a majority, wins the presidency. The vice presidential election is a separate election, is held on the same rules, and voters may split their ticket. Both winners will serve six-year terms commencing on the noon of June 30, 2016, and ending on the same day six years later.

== Candidates ==
List of Presidential and Vice Presidential candidates on the ballot
Presidential candidate		Vice presidential candidate		Campaign
Candidate name and party	Position	Candidate name and party	Position	Campaign
Jejomar Binay UNA	Vice President	Gregorio Honasan UNA	Senator	(campaign)
Miriam Defensor Santiago PRP	Senator	Bongbong Marcos Independent (Note: Cayetano, Marcos and Trillanes are all members of the Nacionalista Party, but failed to get that party's nomination; instead, all of them ran as independents.)	Senator	(campaign)
Rodrigo Duterte PDP–Laban	Mayor of Davao City	Alan Peter Cayetano Independent	Senator	(campaign)
Grace Poe Independent	Senator	Francis Escudero Independent	Senator	(campaign)
Mar Roxas Liberal	Former secretary of the Interior and Local Government	Leni Robredo Liberal	House representative from Camarines Sur's 3rd district	(campaign)
None		Antonio Trillanes Independent	Senator	

== Results ==
A total of 2,312,593 voters came out to vote out of the 2,722,288 registered voters in the province and the city.

=== All of Cebu results ===
These results combine Cebu province, Cebu City, Lapu-Lapu City, and Mandaue City.

==== Presidential result ====
2016 Philippine presidential election in all of Cebu (Note: The 1,435 votes for Roy Señeres are not listed here as they are deemed Invalid.)
Party	Candidate	Votes	%
PDP–Laban	Rodrigo Duterte	1,235,591	53.48%
Liberal	Mar Roxas	627,639	27.17%
Independent	Grace Poe	278,080	12.04%
UNA	Jejomar Binay	130,235	5.64%
PRP	Miriam Defensor Santiago	38,872	1.68%
Total votes		2,310,417	100.00%

==== Vice presidential result ====
2016 Philippine vice presidential election in all of Cebu
Party	Candidate	Votes	%
Liberal	Leni Robredo	875,852	39.45%
Independent	Alan Peter Cayetano	716,443	32.27%
Independent	Bongbong Marcos	331,518	14.93%
Independent	Francis Escudero	211,427	9.52%
UNA	Gregorio Honasan	48,628	2.19%
Independent	Antonio Trillanes	36,345	1.64%
Total votes		2,220,213	100.00%

=== Cebu province results ===
==== Presidential result ====
2016 Philippine presidential election in Cebu (Note: The 1,023 votes for Roy Señeres are not listed here as they are deemed Invalid.)
Party	Candidate	Votes	%
PDP–Laban	Rodrigo Duterte	762,559	50.70%
Liberal	Mar Roxas	459,089	30.52%
Independent	Grace Poe	192,235	12.78%
UNA	Jejomar Binay	70,867	4.71%
PRP	Miriam Defensor Santiago	19,386	1.29%
Total votes		1,504,136	100.00%

==== Vice presidential result ====
2016 Philippine vice presidential election in Cebu
Party	Candidate	Votes	%
Liberal	Leni Robredo	590,777	41.37%
Independent	Alan Peter Cayetano	447,955	31.37%
Independent	Bongbong Marcos	196,943	13.79%
Independent	Francis Escudero	146,498	10.26%
Independent	Antonio Trillanes	23,993	1.68%
UNA	Gregorio Honasan	21,767	1.52%
Total votes		1,427,933	100.00%

=== Cebu City results ===
==== Presidential result ====
2016 Philippine presidential election in Cebu City (Note: The 226 votes for Roy Señeres are not listed here as they are deemed Invalid.)
Party	Candidate	Votes	%
PDP–Laban	Rodrigo Duterte	296,246	58.85%
Liberal	Mar Roxas	90,420	17.96%
Independent	Grace Poe	52,169	10.36%
UNA	Jejomar Binay	51,002	10.13%
PRP	Miriam Defensor Santiago	13,512	2.68%
Total votes		503,349	100.00%

==== Vice presidential result ====
2016 Philippine vice presidential election in Cebu City
Party	Candidate	Votes	%
Independent	Alan Peter Cayetano	167,705	33.87%
Liberal	Leni Robredo	162,509	32.82%
Independent	Bongbong Marcos	92,007	18.58%
Independent	Francis Escudero	41,390	8.36%
UNA	Gregorio Honasan	23,506	4.75%
Independent	Antonio Trillanes	7,972	1.61%
Total votes		495,089	100.00%

=== Lapu-Lapu City results ===
==== Presidential result ====
2016 Philippine presidential election in Lapu-Lapu City (Note: The 112 votes for Roy Señeres are not listed here as they are deemed Invalid.)
Party	Candidate	Votes	%
PDP–Laban	Rodrigo Duterte	83,283	55.41%
Liberal	Mar Roxas	44,676	29.73%
Independent	Grace Poe	15,951	10.61%
UNA	Jejomar Binay	3,719	2.47%
PRP	Miriam Defensor Santiago	2,663	1.77%
Total votes		150,292	100.00%

==== Vice presidential result ====
2016 Philippine vice presidential election in Lapu-Lapu City
Party	Candidate	Votes	%
Liberal	Leni Robredo	63,766	43.37%
Independent	Alan Peter Cayetano	46,469	31.60%
Independent	Bongbong Marcos	21,104	14.35%
Independent	Francis Escudero	11,840	8.05%
Independent	Antonio Trillanes	2,167	1.47%
UNA	Gregorio Honasan	1,695	1.15%
Total votes		147,041	100.00%

=== Mandaue City results ===
Source: GMA News Online

==== Presidential result ====
2016 Philippine presidential election in Mandaue City (Note: The 74 votes for Roy Señeres are not listed here as they are deemed Invalid.)
Party	Candidate	Votes	%
PDP–Laban	Rodrigo Duterte	93,503	61.26%
Liberal	Mar Roxas	33,454	21.92%
Independent	Grace Poe	17,725	11.61%
UNA	Jejomar Binay	4,647	3.04%
PRP	Miriam Defensor Santiago	3,311	2.17%
Total votes		152,640	100.00%

==== Vice presidential result ====
2016 Philippine vice presidential election in Mandaue City
Party	Candidate	Votes	%
Independent	Alan Peter Cayetano	59,510	39.63%
Liberal	Leni Robredo	53,604	35.7%
Independent	Bongbong Marcos	21,464	14.3%
Independent	Francis Escudero	11,699	7.79%
Independent	Antonio Trillanes	2,213	1.47%
UNA	Gregorio Honasan	1,660	1.11%
Total votes		150,150	100.00%
