= Mr. Palengke =

2004 political campaign monicker

Mr. Palengke (lit. 'Mr. Public Market') is the campaign monicker and jingle of then-administration candidate Mar Roxas for the 2004 Philippine Senate election. Produced by Image Dimensions, the accompanying television advertisement featured Roxas sashaying to the jingle, inspired by hit song "Mr. Suave" of Parokya ni Edgar, together with the vendors of his family-owned Farmers Market. It is, actually, in reference to Roxas' stint as Secretary of Trade and Industry from 2000 to 2003, where one of his responsibilities was to monitor the prices of basic commodities in the palengke, spearheading consumer protection programs such as timbangan ng bayan.

The monicker was a strategy to make the member of elite Araneta family appealing and palatable to the masses. It has been since considered to be one of the most successful political advertisement in the Philippines, as the monicker-jingle made Roxas, a relatively-unknown politician, top the senatorial race.

Roxas would attempt to revive his monicker in his subsequent unsuccessful campaigns for vice presidency, presidency, and senatorship in the elections of 2010, 2016, and 2019, respectively.
