= Poblacion =

Central or downtown area of a Philippine city or municipality

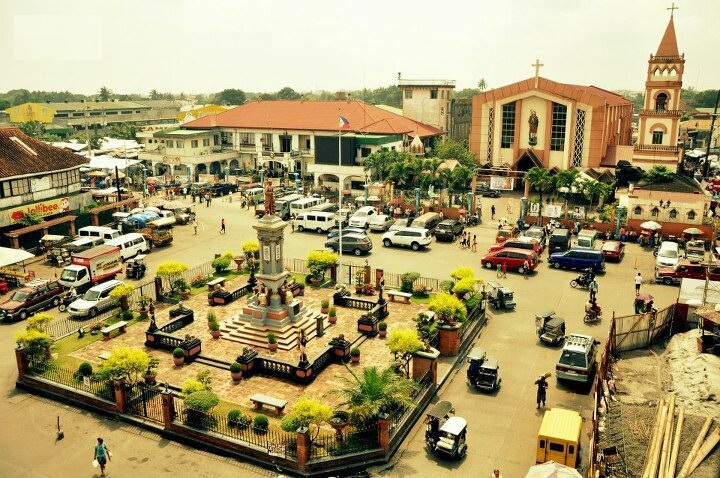
Plaza Rizal in Biñan's población

Poblacion (from Spanish población, meaning "population"), sometimes abbreviated as Pob., is a term used in the Philippines to refer to the administrative center, downtown, old town, or commercial area of a city or municipality. It may consist of a single barangay or multiple barangays. Colloquially, the población area is also called bayan (see also other definitions of bayan), plaza, or centro.

== History ==
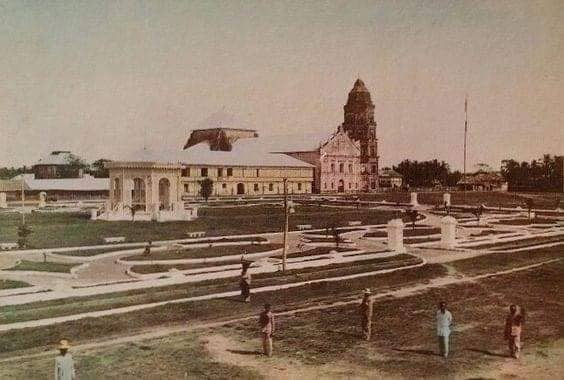
Old photo of Lingayen Church and the town plaza (foreground), common features marking a traditional pobalción

During Spanish colonial rule, the government established hundreds of formal settlements across the archipelago modelled after towns and villages in Spain. The authorities often adopted a policy of reducción, the resettlement of inhabitants in far-flung and scattered barangays in a more centralized cabecera (town/district capital), built around a new church and ayuntamiento (town hall). This enabled the government to defend, control, and Christianize the indigenous population, as well as facilitate censuses and taxation.

== Features ==
The población is considered the commercial and industrial center of a Philippine city or municipality. Residents of outlying barangays and satellite sitios visit the población on market days (which are set by local ordinance), to trade in local goods and services at the public market. This allows faster sales to a wide range of buyers; others would also shop at neighbouring town's población if it is closer. In some cities and towns, the población (usually surrounding the parish church) is an old town district with a few surviving Spanish-era structures.

There are also cases of multiple poblaciones such as in Iloilo City, where each geographical district has its own center. These were former independent municipalities in the Spanish era, and consolidated only afterwards.

The cabecera (capital) has a basic plan: a plaza mayor is bounded by the local church and attached convento, civic buildings such as the town hall, and houses of prominent residents. Other features include a public market, the central elementary school and high school, police station, fire station, and hospital, banks, transport hubs, as well as commercial buildings.

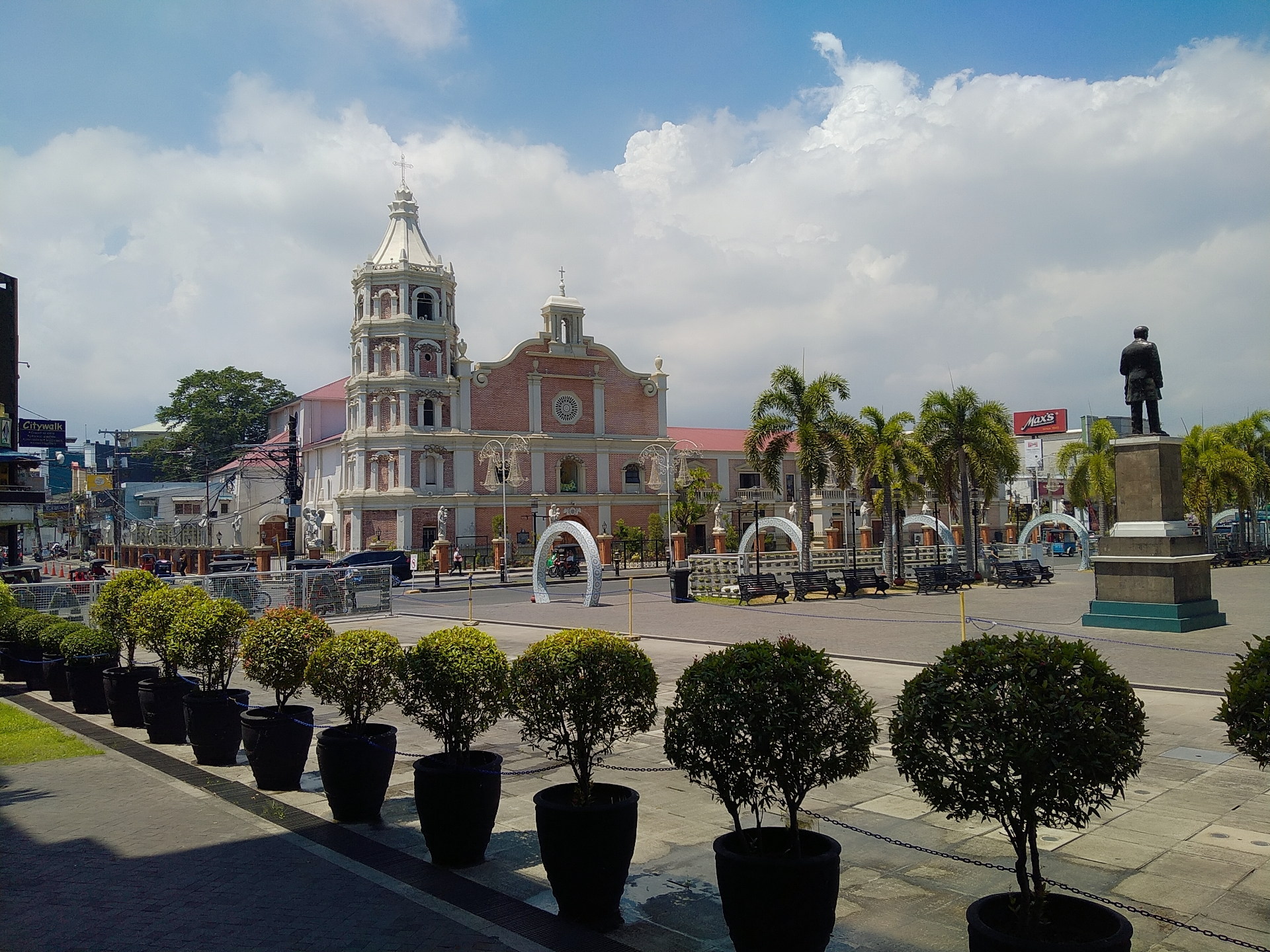
Balanga city plaza showing the church

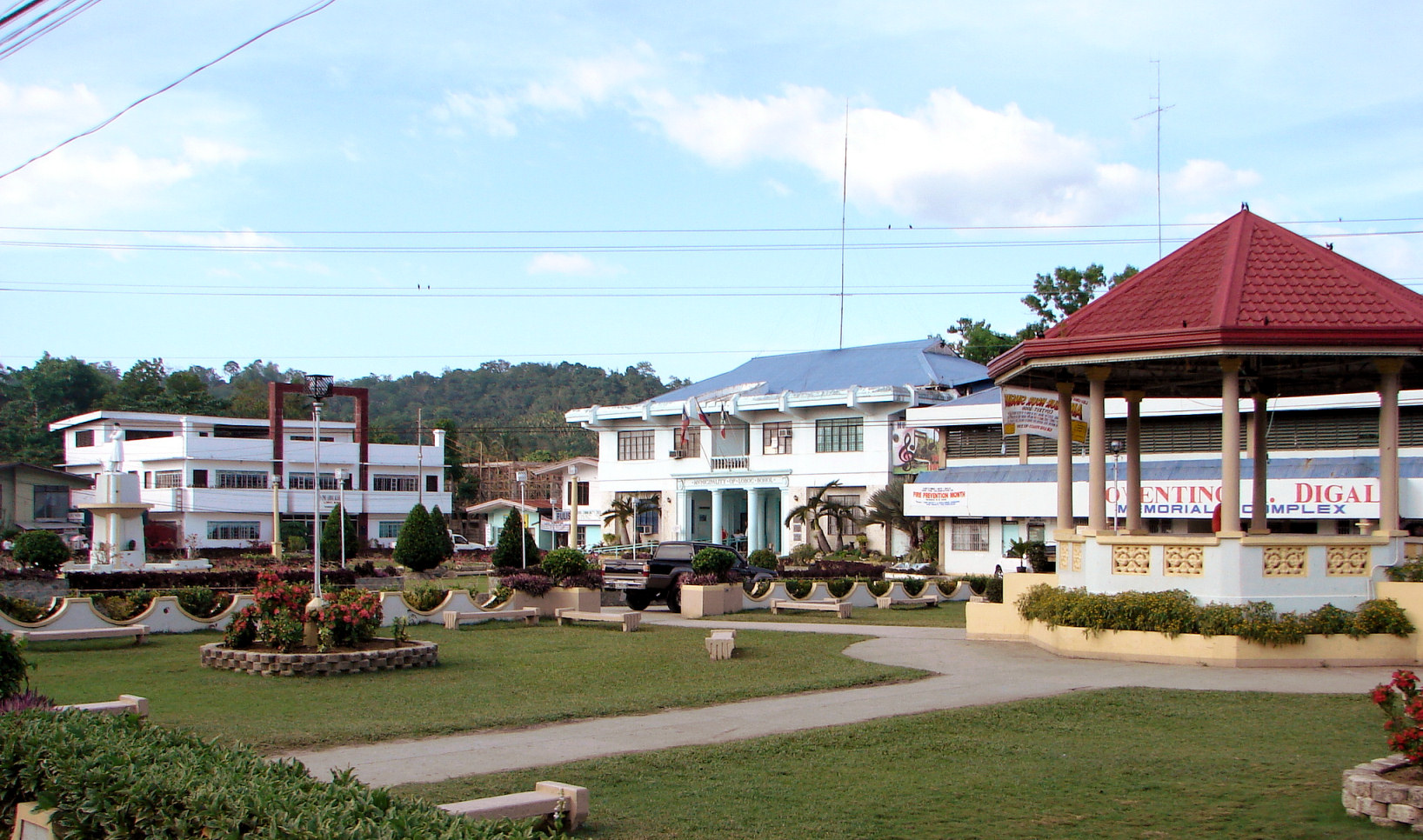
The población of Loboc, Bohol, showing structures typical to most town centres: the plaza, town hall, gazebo, and arena

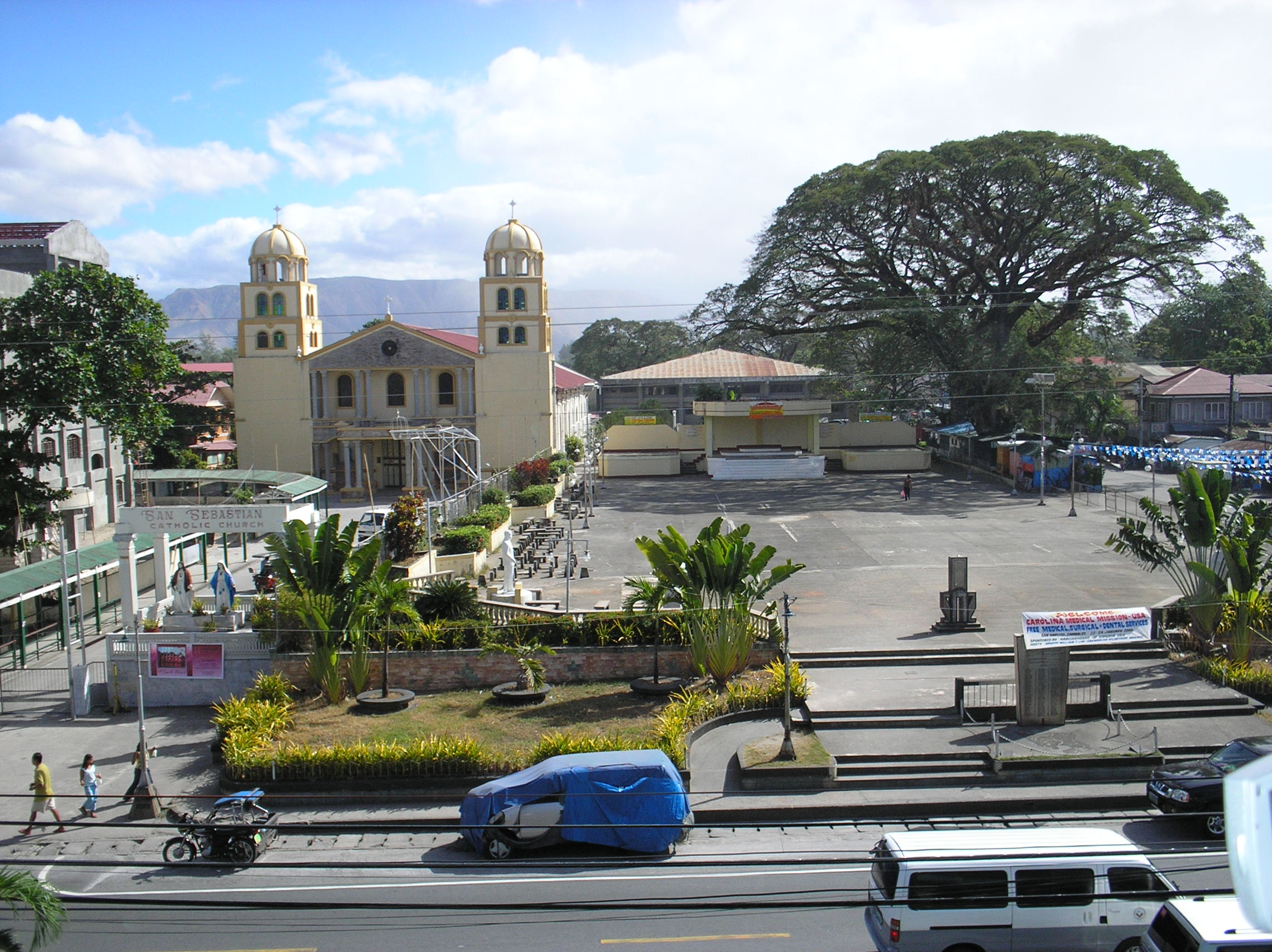
San Narciso, Zambales poblacion, showing the church and town plaza

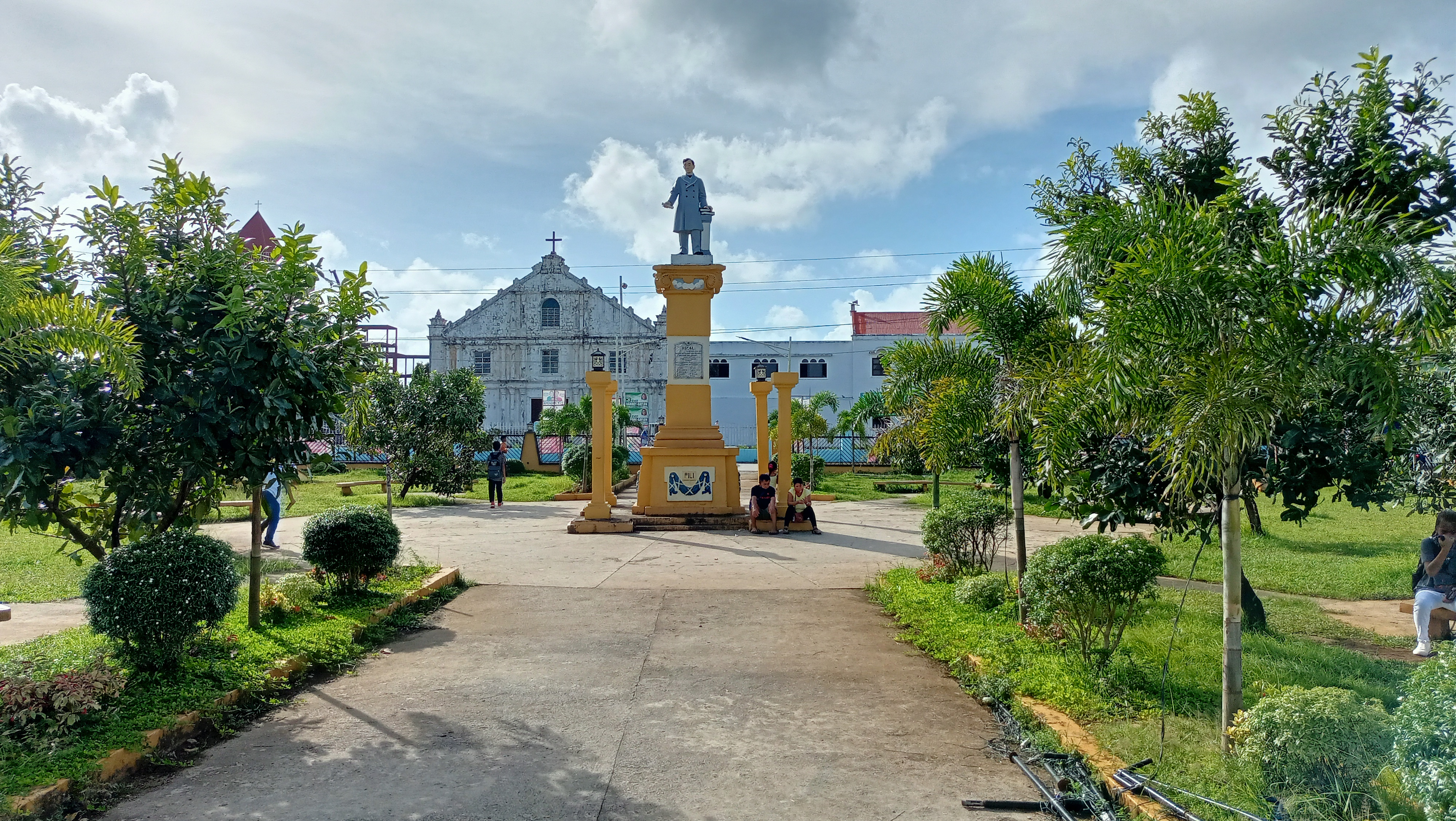
Plaza at Guiuan, Eastern Samar with the church in the background

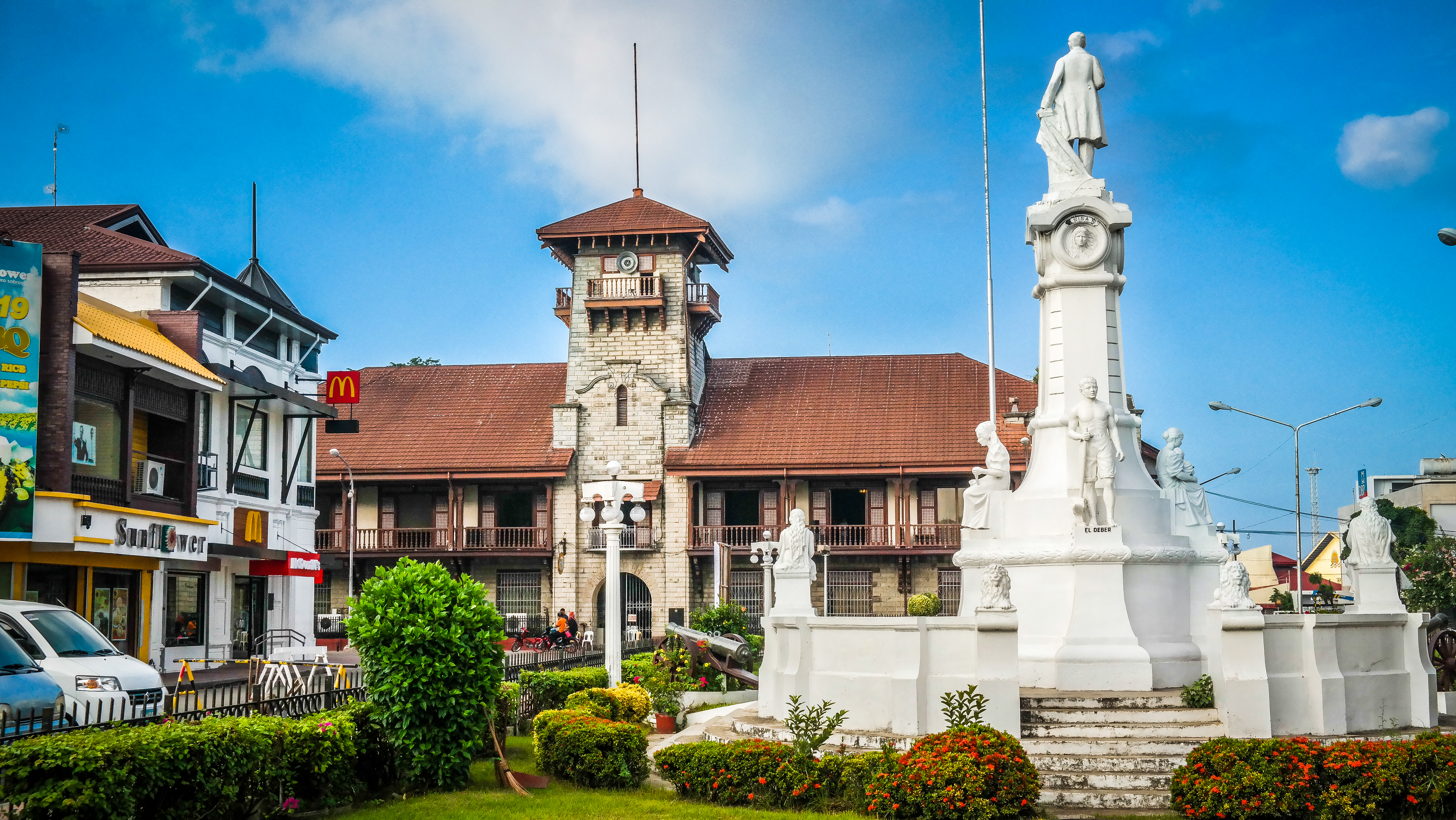
Plaza Rizal at Zamboanga City showing houses with Spanish Colonial architecture

== See also ==
- Barangay
- Purok
- Sitio
