= Palengke =

Filipino permanent wet market

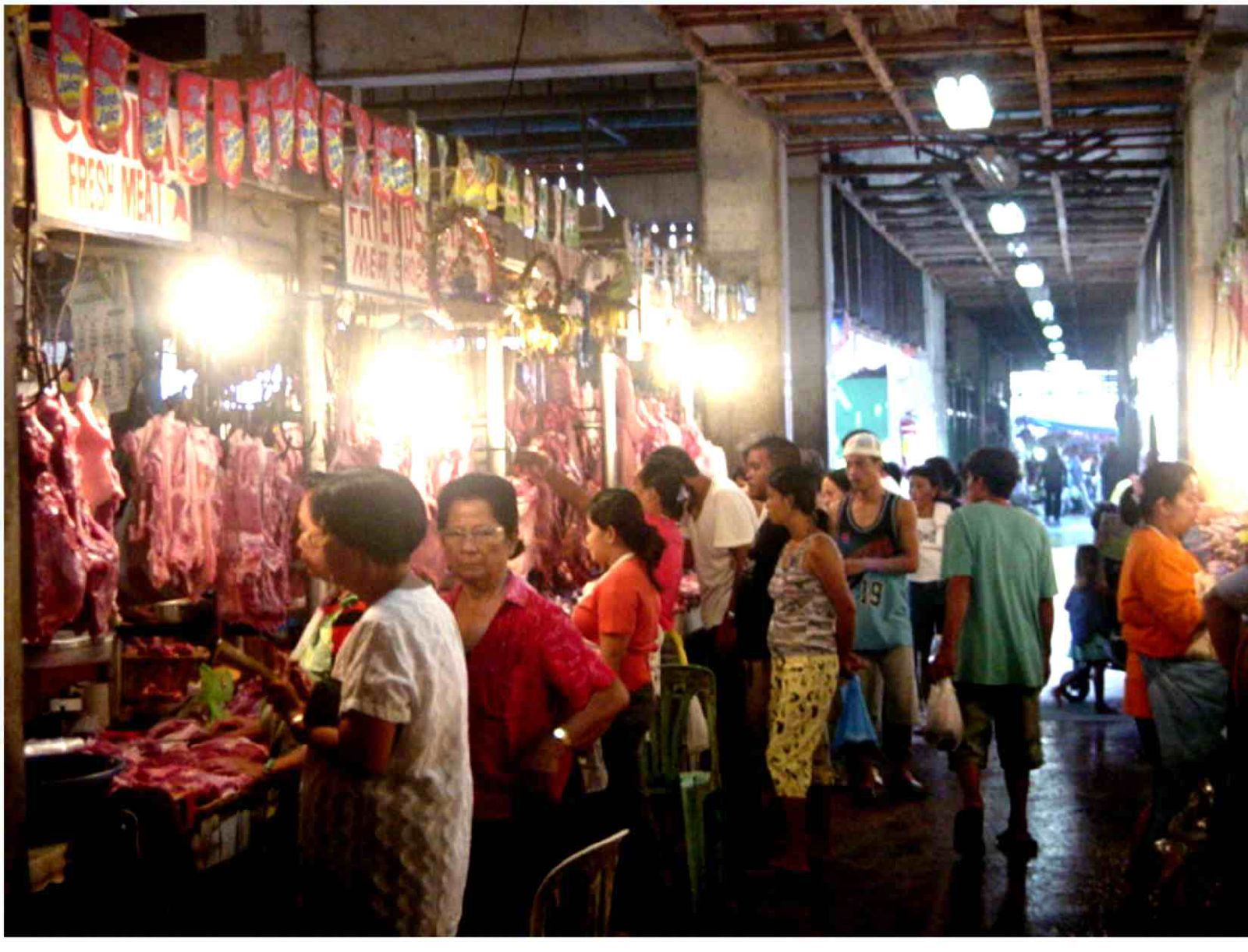
A typical public market, in Danao, Cebu, locally known as a "palengke" in the Philippines

A palengke (Chavacano: palenque) is a permanent wet market in the Philippines (differentiated from periodic wet markets called talipapa).

== Etymology ==
The word palengke is a local variant of the Spanish word palenque, literally meaning "(wooden) palisade or stockade" and by extension the area enclosed by such a structure for defense, public festivals or some other purpose. The Spanish word is also used to describe a pathway or cluster of tables set up at some place of gathering such as a theatre, tournament or market, and it is from this latter sense that palengke likely derives its usage in the Filipino context.

In the former Spanish colonies of New Spain in the Americas palenque also described a gathering-place of indios. One false etymology for palengke/palenque appearing in some popular sources mistakenly presumes that palenque is instead a word from the indigenous Mayan languages of Central America meaning "gathering place", and that in colonial times the Spanish adopted it to describe a gathering of indigenous groups. While its use in Latin America to describe such a gathering is attested, the word itself originates from Spanish and not any of the indigenous languages; the mistaken belief of the word's indigenous origin is probably reinforced by Palenque—the famous Maya archaeological site in Chiapas, Mexico—which was named after the nearby Spanish village when the site was rediscovered in the mid-18th century.

== Description ==
A palengke is usually composed of several dozen stalls arranged in rows under a shared roof. Management is usually by the local governmental units whose jurisdiction encompasses the physical location of the markets. Certain pieces of legislation, however, such as the Cooperatives Code (RA 7160) and the Agriculture and Fisheries Modernization Act (RA 8435) have prescribed that management of the markets be accomplished through cooperatives. There is little control over the day-to-day management of individual stalls, including commodity pricing. This has resulted in what has been called "palengke mechanics". A cited example would be the price of chicken during the local 2007 holiday season; lack of demand for the product resulted in prices going up rather than down. It was stated that this was the result of local retailers raising prices to recover financial losses from low demand. The Philippine government retains some control over the price of some commodities sold in palengke, especially critical foods such as rice. The National Food Authority calls this regulation campaign (specifically for rice), Palengke Watch.

== Issues ==
The concept has its criticisms, citing several drawbacks. Some are known to use wells, some illegally constructed, as water sources leading to possibly unsanitary water conditions. Another criticism of the traditional palengke is that it is an old concept that must make way for modern development; a Pasig mayor once opined that the palengke was outdated.

A few local politicians have used as their nicknames, such as "Mr. Palengke" (Tagalog: Palengkero; or some iteration) to signify affinity with the masses. Prominent local politician Mar Roxas used the nickname Mr. Palengke to his advantage, gaining a Senate seat in the 2004 Philippine general election.

=== Competition ===
In recent years, the typical palengke has been supplanted by larger, more commercialized shopping centers. The rise of shopping malls and supermarkets have also been cited as threats to the old-school public markets. In a 2002 article, the president of the National Federation of Market Vendors Cooperatives, a cooperative of market vendors throughout the country, stated that the concept of the palengke was an integral part of Philippine culture. He stressed that the public market instilled a sense of community that was not evident in the more-commercialized shopping malls. In spite of this, at least one traditional market has been renovated to appeal to more commercialized consumers. A specific case is the "Mutya ng Pasig Market" which was renovated in late 2008, from a traditional palengke into more of a shopping mall.

== Gallery ==
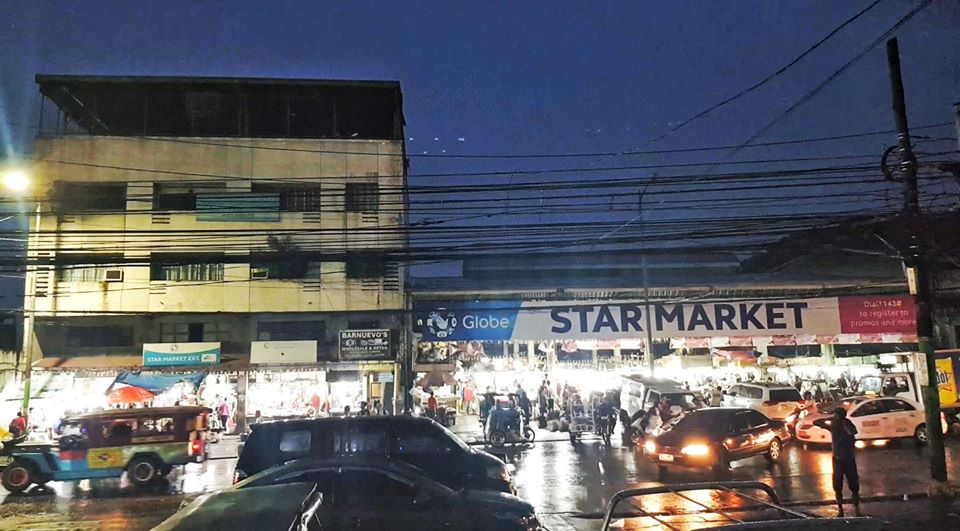
Typical wet market scene in Novaliches, Quezon City taken at dawn when the palengke is most active.

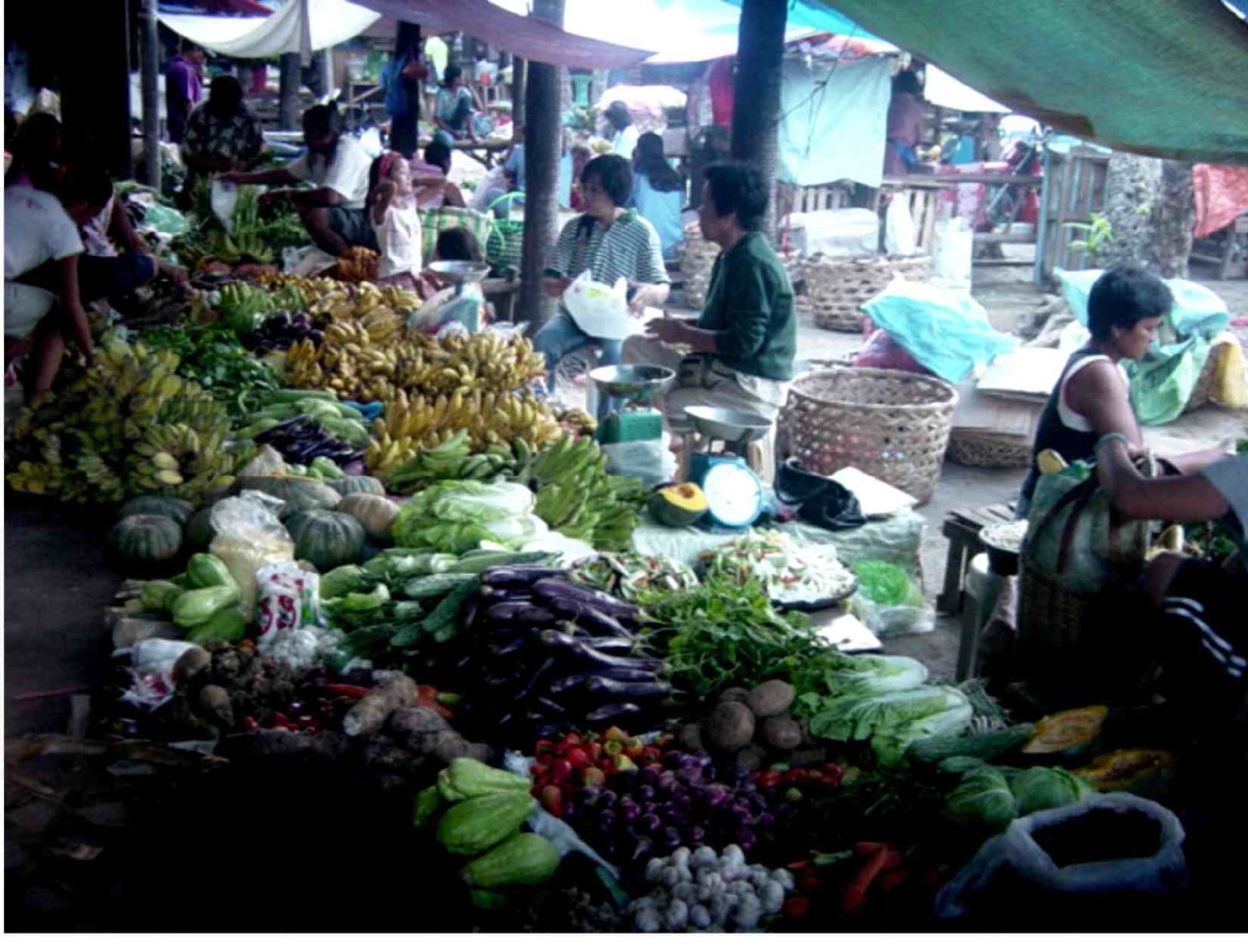
Produce being sold on the ground at the Danao City public market

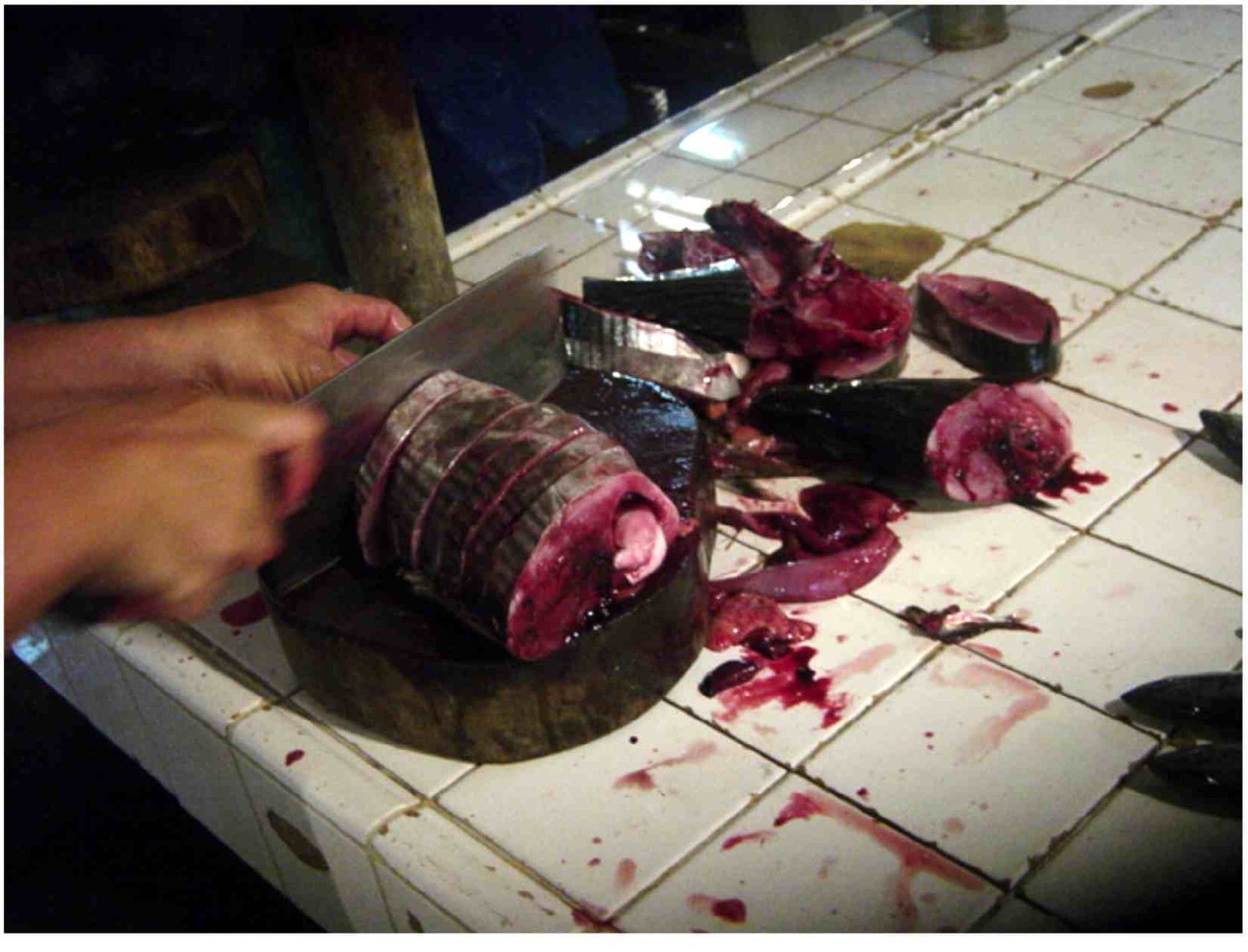
A scombrid, being chopped into fillets at the Danao City Public Market in Cebu

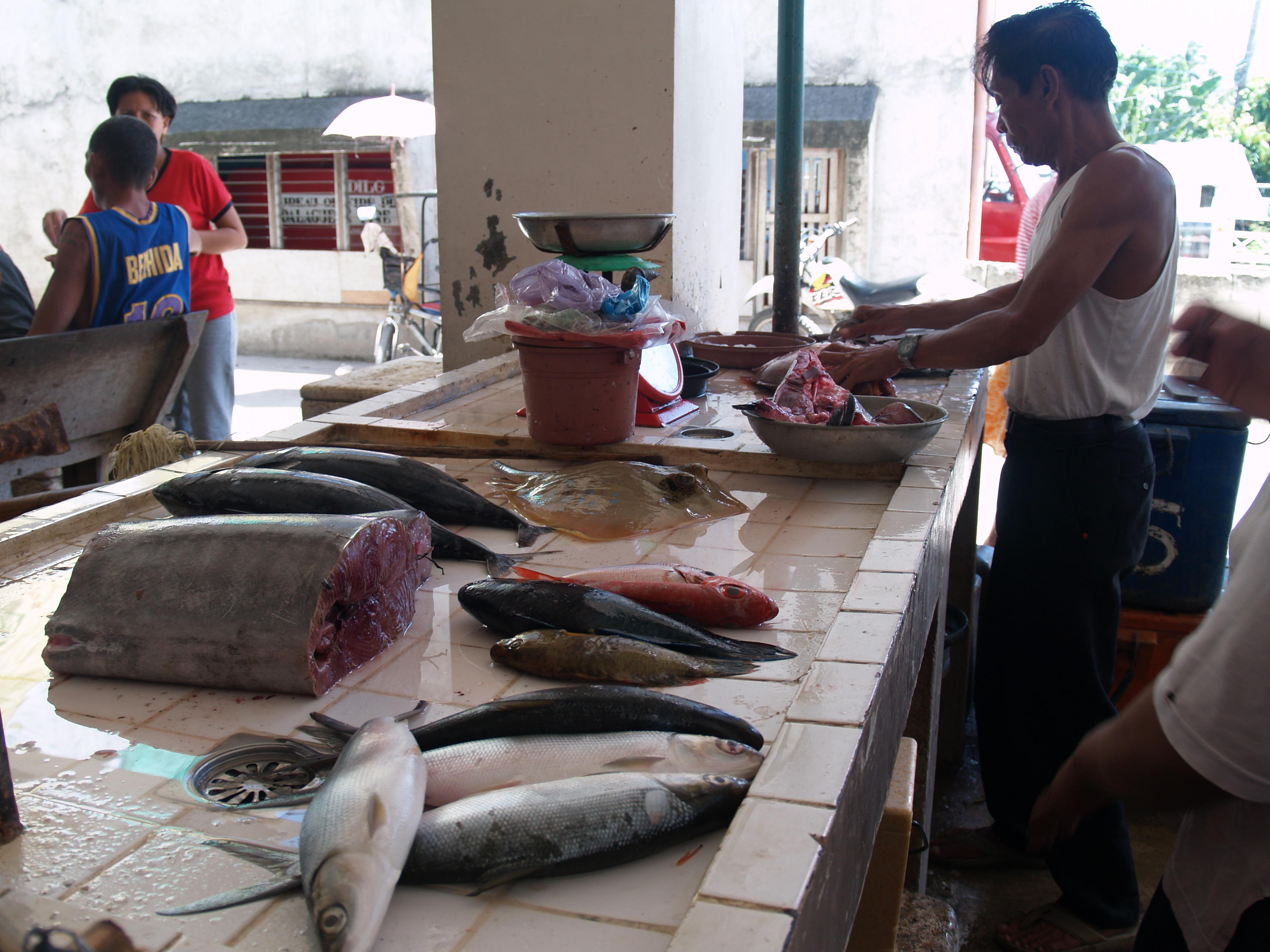
Some Chanos chanos, a chunk of Makaira indica, several scombrids and a stingray, Dasyatis kuhlii at a palengke in Dalaguete, Cebu

== See also ==
- Bazaar
- Haat
- Market (place)
- Retail
- Wet market
- Tiangge
- Ukay-ukay
