= Club Filipino =

Social club for high society Filipinos

- Logo

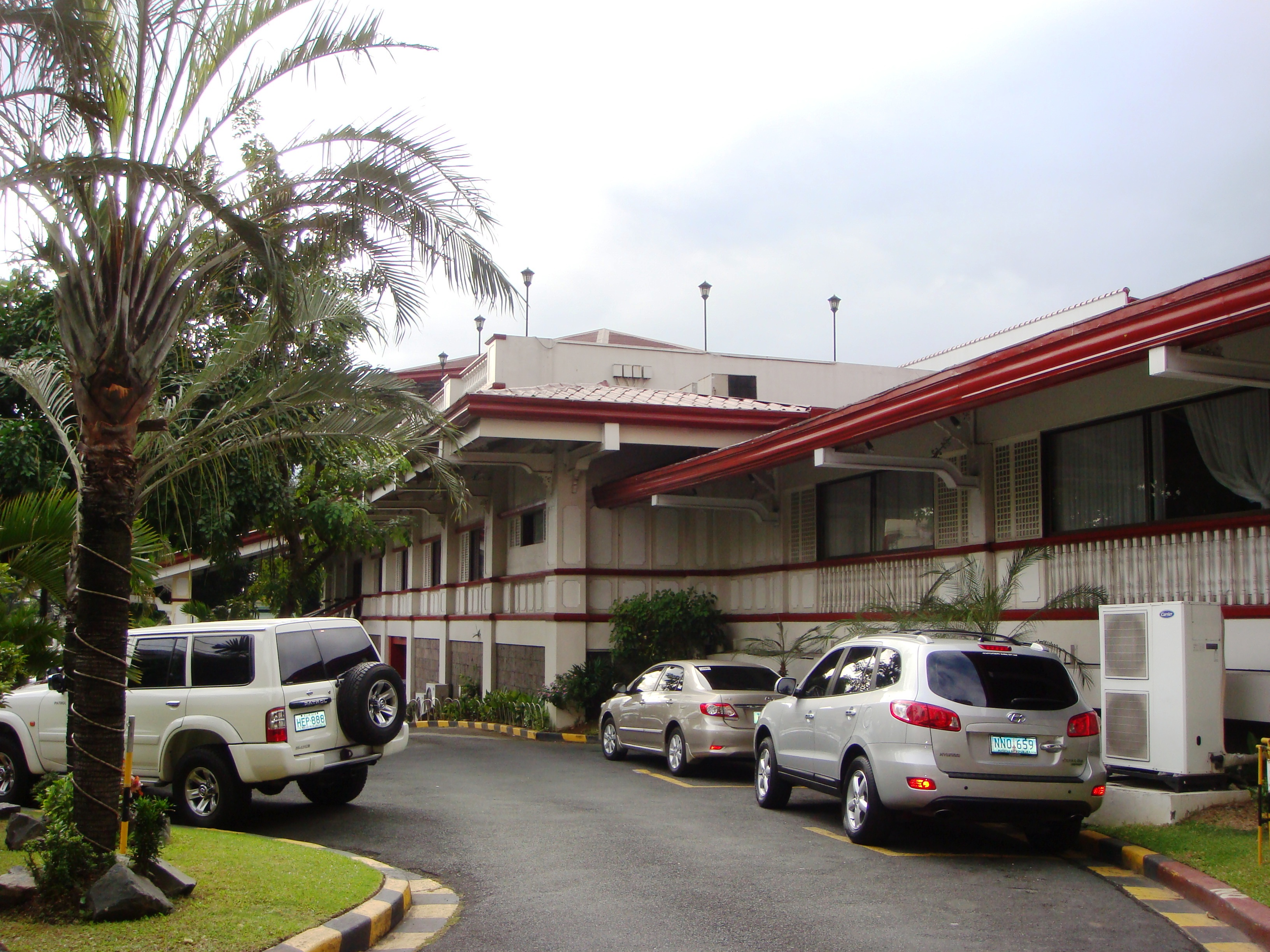
- Clubhouse
- Established: November 6, 1898; 127 years ago
- Type: Social club
- Location: Greenhills, San Juan, Metro Manila, Philippines
- Coordinates: 14°36′15″N 121°02′56″E
- Formerly called: Club Filipino Independiente; Club Internationale

Club Filipino (pronounced klub, Tagalog: [ˌklub fɪ.lɪˈpiː.n̪o]) is the first exclusive social club in the Philippines, founded on November 6, 1898 by Filipino high society, including Spanish mestizos and members of the native aristocracy. It is located between North Greenhills subdivision and the Greenhills Shopping Center in San Juan.

The club's present amenities include a swimming pool, tennis, badminton and squash courts, bowling alleys, outdoor restaurant, salon, and "Kalayaan Hall," an indoor events/reception room.

== History ==
Originally an elite Filipino country gentlemen's organisation, it was originally called Club Filipino Independiente, later changed to Club Internationale and finally, Club Filipino. The club has developed a reputation for being a meeting ground for Filipino political progressives throughout its history, and was the site of several political events immediately prior and during the country's Post-Martial Law Era.

Prior to its current location in Greenhills, San Juan, the club was located at the Bachrach Mansion along Manga Avenue corner Buenos Aires Street in Santa Mesa, Manila. At the said location, President Ramon Magsaysay inaugurated it on September 21, 1956, after arriving directly from a very rough flight from Davao City. The President himself joined the exclusive club the very same day. The said house was owned by Russian-American Jew Emil Bachrach, who was a successful businessman in Manila during the Philippine Commonwealth. During World War II, the house was commandeered by Gen. Tomoyuki Yamashita upon his assignment in the Philippines, and later on was taken up as residence by Gen. Douglas MacArthur and his family.

The present location in Greenhills was inaugurated on October 18, 1970, and served as the venue for the inauguration of President Corazon Aquino on 25 February 1986 at the height of the People Power Revolution. This was also where Governor Luis "Chavit" Singson went public with an alleged illegal gambling (jueteng) payroll scam involving then-President Joseph Ejercito Estrada in 2000. On September 9, 2009, Corazon Aquino's son, then-Senator Benigno Aquino III, announced his bid at the club to run as the presidential candidate for the Liberal Party in the 2010 general election. Six years later, on July 31, 2015, then-President Aquino III formally endorsed Mar Roxas as the LP's presidential candidate for the 2016 elections in the "Gathering of Friends" held at the venue itself. On February 13, 2025, the club became the venue of the kick-off rally of PDP–Laban's senatorial slate ahead of the 2025 election, with former President Rodrigo Duterte in attendance.
