= Mar Roxas =

Filipino politician (born 1957)

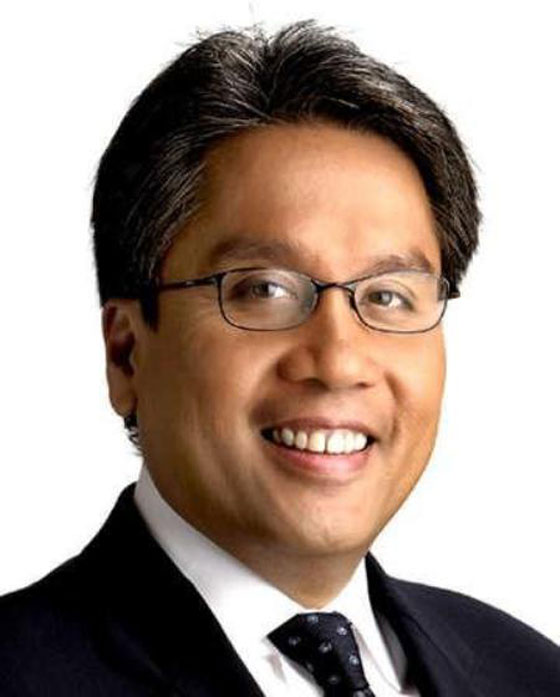
- Official portrait, c.2010s

37th Secretary of the Interior and Local Government
- In office September 19, 2012 – September 11, 2015
- President: Benigno Aquino III
- Preceded by: Paquito Ochoa Jr. (acting)
- Succeeded by: Mel Senen Sarmiento

38th Secretary of Transportation and Communications
- In office July 4, 2011 – October 18, 2012
- President: Benigno Aquino III
- Preceded by: Jose de Jesus
- Succeeded by: Jun Abaya

Senator of the Philippines
- In office June 30, 2004 – June 30, 2010

30th Secretary of Trade and Industry
- In office January 2, 2000 – December 10, 2003
- President: Joseph Estrada; Gloria Macapagal Arroyo
- Preceded by: Jose Pardo
- Succeeded by: Cesar Purisima

House Majority Leader
- In office July 27, 1998 – January 2, 2000
- Preceded by: Rodolfo Albano
- Succeeded by: Eduardo Gullas

Member of the Philippine House of Representatives from Capiz's 1st congressional district
- In office September 1, 1993 – January 2, 2000
- Preceded by: Gerardo Roxas Jr.
- Succeeded by: Rodriguez Dadivas

14th President of the Liberal Party
- In office November 6, 2007 – September 30, 2012
- Preceded by: Franklin Drilon
- Succeeded by: Jun Abaya

Personal details
- Born: Manuel Araneta Roxas II; May 13, 1957 (age 69) Manila, Philippines
- Party: Liberal (1993–present); One Capiz (local party; 2024–present)
- Spouse: Korina Sanchez (m. 2009)
- Children: 3
- Parent(s): Gerry Roxas; Judy Araneta
- Education: Wharton School of the University of Pennsylvania (BS)
- Website: Official website

Manuel "Mar" Araneta Roxas II (Tagalog: [ˈɾɔhas]; born May 13, 1957) is a Filipino former politician who served as a senator of the Philippines from 2004 to 2010. He is the grandson and namesake of former Philippine President Manuel Roxas. He served in the Cabinet of the Philippines as the 37th secretary of the interior and local government from 2012 to 2015 after serving as the 30th secretary of trade and industry from 2000 to 2003 and 38th secretary of transportation and communications from 2011 to 2012. He is the son of former senator Gerry Roxas.

After graduation from the University of Pennsylvania, Roxas worked as a banker in New York, mobilizing venture capital funds for small and medium enterprises. He served as the Representative of the Capiz's first district from 1993 to 2000. His stint as congressman was cut short after he was appointed by President Joseph Estrada as Secretary of Trade and Industry. He resigned from the position at the height of the Second EDSA Revolution and was later re-appointed by President Gloria Macapagal Arroyo in her new cabinet. He resigned again to run for a Senate seat in the 2004 election. Campaigning as Mr. Palengke, he was elected senator with 19 million votes, the highest ever garnered by a national candidate in any Philippine election at that time. Roxas co-authored the Expanded Value Added Tax Law (E-Vat).

Initially one of the leading candidates in the 2010 presidential election, he slid down to become a vice-presidential candidate in order to make way for fellow senator Benigno Aquino III, who won. Roxas was defeated by Makati mayor Jejomar Binay of PDP–Laban by a margin of 727,084 votes. He filed an electoral protest before the Supreme Court of the Philippines, with the Court sitting as the Presidential Electoral Tribunal. On June 7, 2011, President Aquino appointed Roxas as transportation and communications secretary to replace outgoing secretary Jose de Jesus, and he took office on July 4, 2011. Afterwards, on August 31, 2012, President Aquino nominated him as interior and local government secretary, replacing Jesse Robredo, who died in a plane crash.

Roxas was the standard-bearer of the Liberal Party for the 2016 presidential election. He was officially endorsed by President Aquino to continue the present administration's reforms, collectively dubbed Daang Matuwid ("straight path"), which he formally accepted on July 31, 2015. On August 3, 2015, Roxas officially tendered his resignation as interior and local government secretary to focus on his presidential campaign. After placing second in the election, Roxas conceded to Davao City mayor Rodrigo Duterte on May 10, 2016. He would later attempt a comeback to the Senate in 2019, but lost.

== Early life and background ==
Manuel Araneta Roxas II was born on May 13, 1957, in Manila to Judy Araneta (1934–2025; of Bago, Negros Occidental) and Gerry Roxas (1923–1982; of Capiz), a Representative for Capiz (1957–1963) and a Senator (1963–1972).

Mar is one of the grandchildren of Manuel Roxas, the first President of the Third Philippine Republic (1946–48), and Trinidad de Leon. The couple married in 1955. He has two siblings: Maria Lourdes (married to Augusto Ojeda and mother of three) and Gerardo Jr. (1960–1993), a former congressman.

After grade school and high school at the Ateneo de Manila University, Roxas attended the Wharton School of the University of Pennsylvania in Philadelphia, majoring in Economics and earning a Bachelor of Science degree in 1979. After graduation, he worked for seven years as an investment banker in New York City, and became an assistant vice president of the New York-based Allen & Company.

Following the 1985 announcement by President Ferdinand Marcos of a snap election, Roxas took a leave of absence to join the presidential campaign of Corazon Aquino. In September 1986, President Corazon Aquino went to the United States. Roxas was one of those who organized a series of investment round-table discussions with the American business community.

From 1986 onwards, Roxas visited the Philippines more frequently and proposed to Allen & Company to set up a branch in Asia, specifically in the Philippines; later his superiors agreed. In 1991, he was stationed in the Philippines with North Star Capitals, Inc. which took public the Jollibee fast food restaurant chain. In the United States, he participated in the first financing for Discovery Channel and Tri-Star Pictures.

== Congress ==
Roxas' younger brother, Dinggoy, who represented the Capiz's first district, died of colon cancer in 1993. At the age of 36, he decided to run in the special election to replace his brother in the seat and won, having been unopposed. He later became Majority Leader of the House of Representatives.

His landmark laws include, among others:

- Republic Act No. 8759 – establishing in all municipalities a Public Employment Service Office which serves as an employment facilitation and information center, and links all job opportunities within the region;
- Republic Act No. 8748 – amending the Special Economic Zone Act by directly allocating to the municipality or city 2% (out of the 5%) gross tax to be collected from the establishments operating in the ecozone and providing for disturbance compensation for persons to be displaced or evicted by publicly owned ecozones;
- Republic Act No. 8756 – incentivizing the establishment of regional headquarters to encourage investment and operation of multinational companies in the country and to generate more jobs.

His tenure in the House was most noted for his principal authorship of Republic Act No. 7880 (Roxas Law), which ensures fair distribution of the education capital budget among all the provinces. This started his advocacy for fair and equitable access to education, free from regional bias and political patronage considerations.

== Estrada cabinet ==
Roxas resigned from the House of Representatives following his appointment as Secretary of Trade and Industry under the Estrada administration in 2000, replacing Jose Pardo who was appointed Secretary of Finance. During his stint, Roxas was named as Chairman of the Information Technology and Electronic Commerce Council, a body formed with the participation of both the government and private sector to monitor the implementation of the E-Commerce Law (Republic Act 8792) and programs pushing for the growth of IT-enabled services. He resigned the position in November, as Estrada was under fire due to allegations of corruption.

== Arroyo cabinet ==
In January 2001, just days after Estrada had been overthrown, Roxas was re-appointed to the same office by newly installed President Gloria Macapagal Arroyo.

During his four-year stint as DTI Secretary, he pushed for the development of the palengke (market) as the basic unit of the economy and the root of progress, advocating not only consumer welfare and protection but also sound trade and investment policies, particularly SME development.

As a proponent of the philosophy of 'palengkenomics', which considers the "palengke" (wet market) as a microcosm of the economy, Roxas conducted weekly monitoring of the prices of prime commodities.

Among his projects were the following palengke-based programs which promoted supply chain efficiencies:

1. Tamang Timbang, Tamang Presyo (Right Scale, Right Price) for consumers,
2. Presyong Tama, Gamot Pampamilya (Right Price, Family Medicine) to make affordable and quality medicines accessible to Filipinos,
3. Pinoy Pandesal,
4. Palengke ng Bayan (Market of the Country)

His work regarding trade policy was highlighted during the 2003 WTO meeting in Cancún, Mexico, where he fought for increased market access for Philippine exports, particularly agricultural products and a rationalized Philippine trade regime so that domestic industries would not be harmed.

At a time when computer access was limited to an elite few, Roxas initiated the Personal Computers for Public Schools (PCPS) Program, which distributed over 44,240 desktop computers to 3,428 public high schools all over the Philippines. PCPS computers provided 500,000 high school students with the necessary ICT tools and skills.

Roxas pushed for MSME development through the SULONG (SMEs Unified Lending Opportunities for National Growth) Program, which granted almost ₱26.7 billion on low-interest loans to 281,229 SMEs on its first year.

He was named 'Father of the Business Process Outsourcing (BPO)' market in the Philippines, particularly call center operations, by industry stakeholders. From starting out with a mere 2000 jobs at the onset, the IT/BPO industry now provides over a million jobs in the Philippines.

In the year 2000, Roxas was named Chairman of the Information Technology and Electronic Commerce Council. This institution, which was composed of members of the government and the private sector, was formed to monitor the implementation of the E-Commerce Law (Republic Act 8792) and programs pushing for the growth of IT-enabled services.

== Senate ==
On December 10, 2003, Roxas resigned from his post to prepare for his senatorial bid under the banner of the Liberal Party in the 2004 elections. Roxas said that he needed to separate his work in DTI from his work as a candidate and added that his resignation did not surprise the President. He was succeeded by Cesar Purisima, former chairman of the accounting firm Sycip Gorres Velayo & Co.

Upon winning a seat in the 2004 Senate election, Roxas was proclaimed by the Commission on Elections as Senator-elect on May 24, 2004, and officially assumed the office at noon of June 30, 2004.

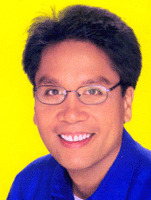
Roxas's Senate portrait, c. 2000s

Roxas held assignments on the Senate Committee on Trade and Commerce and Senate Oversight Committee on Optical Media Board serving alongside Ramon "Bong" Revilla, Jr.

Roxas authored 43 bills and 46 resolutions brought before the 13th Congress in July 2004 and 2007. He filed bills on fighting smuggling, supporting labor, education, economy, and alternative energy.

On February 26, 2006, the Philippines was under a state emergency after the government claimed that it foiled an alleged coup d'état attempt against the administration of Philippine President Gloria Macapagal Arroyo earlier that same day. Two days later, Roxas called on the government to immediately revoke Proclamation No. 1017, saying it betrays its own vision of a strong republic and directly attack Philippine democracy.

Roxas voted in favor of the Revised Value-Added Tax Law when it was deliberated in the Senate. The law was co-authored by other Liberal Party members, Franklin Drilon and Francis Pangilinan. He also voted in favor of the abolition of the death penalty in the Philippines.

Roxas voted against the Human Security Act together with Senator Jamby Madrigal saying that "the fight against terror requires urgent operational reforms over measures that could impair civil liberties". He even warned that the said law poses a danger to the security and rights of every Filipino if there will be no set of implementing rules and regulations laid down.

Roxas' legislative agenda for the 14th Congress is as follows:

- EVAT Funds for Education and Healthcare – He has filed Senate Bill No. 102 (People's Fund Act) to ease the effect of the 12% E-VAT. The People's Fund would consist of thirty percent (30%) of all proceeds from the VAT collected under Title IV of the National Internal Revenue Code. This portion estimates the share of incremental revenues from Republic Act No. 9337, the Expanded Value-Added Tax law, which increased to 12% the VAT and removed the exemption.
- Tax Exemption for Minimum Wage Earners – He has filed Senate Bill No. 103 (Individual Tax Exemption for Minimum Wage Earners Bill) to exempt minimum wage earners in the private sector and government workers in Salary Grades 1 to 3, amending certain provisions of Republic Act No. 8424, otherwise known as the National Internal Revenue Code of 1997, as amended. As per estimates by the National Wages and Productivity Board, there are 7 million workers earning the minimum wage and even below. For him, it is unfair and unjust that the government, under the law, is taking away a portion of their already subsistence-level income.
- Amendments to the Roxas Law – He has filed Senate Bill No. 104 to amend Republic Act No. 7880, also known as the Fair and Equitable Access to Education Act, to eliminate the problem of classroom shortages in the Philippines, as well as enhancing the process of construction, rehabilitation, replacement, completion, and repair of needed school buildings and classrooms.
- Regulating the Pre-Need Industry – He has filed Senate Bill No. 105 (Pre-Need Industry Act of 2007) to address the absence of a statute that regulates the pre-need industry by establishing the Pre-Need Industry Act of 2007 to govern the operations of firms which issue or sell pre-need plans or similar contracts and investments.
- Anti-Smuggling Bill – He has filed Senate Bill No. 106 (Anti-Smuggling Act of 2007) to amend certain provisions of Presidential Decree No. 1464, otherwise known as the Tariff and Customs Code of the Philippines, as amended. Under the proposed bill, an Audit and Transparency Group under the Bureau of Customs, headed by a Deputy Commissioner, would regularly inspect and report on the bureau's operational processes, collection and financial reporting, fiscal and personnel performance, system efficiency, internal control, information and communication flow, fraudulent and illegal practices and other related areas. On the basis of these inspections and reports, the Audit and Transparency Deputy Commissioner can initiate investigations of fraud and other graft and corrupt practices in the bureau, and shall recommend to the Office of the Ombudsman the filing of any cases against personnel and officers involved.
- Lemon Law – He has filed Senate Bill No. 107 (Lemon Law of 2007) to have a one-year period in which buyers of brand-new vehicles can avail of the provisions of this Lemon Law, which allows up to four repairs on the same defect before a replacement or refund of the vehicle can be claimed. For him, it would ensure that the investment on a vehicle is money well-spent.
- SME Magna Carta – He has filed Senate Bill No. 108 (Magna Carta for Micro, Small and Medium Enterprises) to strengthen Republic Act No. 6977, the Magna Carta for Small Enterprises. The focus of the amendments of this bill focuses on three points: guidelines, institutional support and organizational support. Guidelines refer to the specific asset size definition, appropriating a definite and regular amount for the Small and Medium Enterprise Development (SMED) Council and increase in the mandatory allocation to lending activities. Institutional support comprises additional government agencies to coordinate SME efforts and formalization of the SME Development Plan. Lastly, organizational support to intensify the powers and increase capitalization of the Small Business and Guarantee Finance Corporation to complement the growing demands for financing. Other features of the bill include formalizing the celebration of the Micro, Small and Medium Enterprise (MSME) Week and recognition of outstanding MSMEs.
- Free Information Act – He has filed Senate Bill No. 109 (Free Information Act) to implement the Constitutional guarantee to free access by the people to official information, except when the disclosure of such information would jeopardize other prerogatives of the government, namely, the protection of the privacy of individuals, trade secrets, national security, public order and safety, and foreign diplomatic relations. The bill also proposes the adoption by all government bodies a mechanism wherein all written requests for information shall be responded to within two days, unless proper justification is given by the government body, subject only to the payment of reasonable fees for the viewing or reproduction of such information. To compel disclosure of information, in case a government body refuses access to such information on whatever grounds, the Office of the Ombudsman would be tapped to hear any citizens' complaints of not being properly assisted by the pertinent government body. Penalties will be levied to officials or employees who knowingly and unjustly refuse to provide access to information, or who consciously release false or misleading information.
- Decriminalizing Libel – He has filed Senate Bill No. 110 (Penalty of Imprisonment in Libel Cases Abolition Bill) to decriminalize libel and limit the venue of filing libel suits. He believes that the approval of the said measure would be a small way by which Congress may help in alleviating the plight of journalists.
- K–12 Implementation Process - He has filed Senate Bill No. 2294 (Omnibus Education Reform Act of 2008) to strengthen the Philippine education system through timely interventions on the quality of teachers, the medium of instruction used and the evaluation of students' aptitude, among other aspects. It mandates the 9-year implementation process of K–12 that spanned from May 20, 2008 to June 5, 2017 during the administrations of Gloria Macapagal Arroyo to Rodrigo Duterte and effectivity of K–12 four years later on April 24, 2012 as part of the process which increase in the number of years in basic education, from 10 years to 12 years as consistent with global standards.

On November 26, 2007, LP National Executive Council officials resolved to appoint him as president of the Liberal Party.

Roxas was to unite the two LP factions and set the stage for his presidential campaign in the 2010 election. Lito Atienza, however, forthwith questioned Roxas' appointment, attacking the composition of Liberal Party's National Executive Council (NECO) and alleging that the Supreme Court of the Philippines' June 5 resolution ordered the LP leadership's status quo maintenance. Atienza stated: "I have no invitation. They kicked me out of the meeting; How can you (Roxas) unite the party when you take the wrong step?"

Platform

Senator Mar Roxas has taken positions on many national issues since his election as senator during the 2004 Philippine elections.

About the ZTE deal, Roxas introduced a resolution urging President Gloria Macapagal Arroyo to cancel the Philippine government's National Broadband Network (NBN) project with China's Zhong Xing Telecommunications Equipment (ZTE) Corporation.

Roxas said that the $329.4-million deal "was driven by supply and not by demand" and will not benefit Filipinos. He believes that the cancellation of the deal would not affect the relationship of the Philippines with China.

In order to finally put a just closure to national divisiveness, Roxas filed Senate Resolution No. 135 calling on President Gloria Macapagal Arroyo to issue a pardon to former President Joseph Ejercito Estrada (popularly known as "Erap") at the appropriate time, in which he said: "The grant of pardon to Erap on humanitarian grounds should not in any way be construed as condoning corruption, or as diminishing the legal weight of the ruling of the Sandiganbayan, but serves solely as an embodiment of the people's will for closure on one of the most divisive chapters of our national life."

Regarding the Japan–Philippines Economic Partnership Agreement, Roxas has said: "In trade negotiations, no deal is always better than a bad deal."

He issued a warning after President Gloria Macapagal Arroyo pressed on the Senate to ratify the Japan-Philippine Economic Partnership Agreement (JPEPA) amid concerns aired by Tokyo for the early approval.

Roxas was optimistic that the pact would be given serious consideration by the Senate if the government revised the deal to get a better trade-off.

== 2010 elections ==
After his election to the Senate in 2004, Roxas was immediately seen as a potential presidential candidate in the 2010 presidential election. While Roxas himself was coy on his plans, the Mar Roxas for President movement gathered steam with the Liberal Party targeting the youth in the run-up to the election. Other signs included the sprouting of Mar Roxas for President spots on the internet and his colleagues endorsing him as the party's standard bearer. Then Senator Benigno Aquino III declared him as the Liberal Party's nominee and Former Senator Jovito Salonga, Chairman Emeritus of the party, once introduced him as "the next President of the Philippine Republic." Senator Franklin Drilon had also confirmed that Roxas was the party's standard bearer in the election.

But Roxas' campaign did not perform well on surveys, typically placing 4th to 5. However, on September 1, 2009, at the historic Club Filipino in San Juan, Metro Manila, Roxas delivered a speech at a press conference announcing his decision to withdraw from the race and support the candidacy of Aquino for the presidency. Aquino officially launched his campaign eight days later. On September 21, 2009, Roxas, alongside Aquino, officially announced his candidacy for the vice presidency as the nominee of the Liberal Party for vice president, launching the Aquino-Roxas campaign. On November 28, 2009, Aquino and Roxas filed their certificate of candidacy for President and Vice President respectively.

He was defeated by Makati mayor Jejomar Binay of the Partido Demokratiko Pilipino-Lakas ng Bayan (PDP–Laban) by the narrowest margin in the history of the Fifth Republic. Binay's upset victory over Roxas was attributed to the success of the Aquino-Binay campaign, which began when Senator Francis Escudero endorsed Aquino and Binay as president and Vice President respectively. This was done without the consent of the two candidates, especially since Escudero, Binay, and Aquino all came from different political parties. Roxas filed an electoral protest to the Supreme Court of the Philippines at the Presidential Electoral Tribunal. On July 12, 2010, the Supreme Court after reviewing Roxas' electoral protest, declared it sufficient in form and substance and the Presidential Electoral Tribunal sent summons to Vice President Binay to file a comment within 10 days upon receipt of the summons.

Roxas also requested the Presidential Electoral Tribunal to order an independent forensic examination of the 26,000 compact flash cards and the source code of the PCOS machines used in the 2010 elections. As of August 2015, the case remains in pre-trial stage, with the last action taken by the tribunal dating back to December 2012.

== Aquino cabinet ==
Roxas accepted the offer of Aquino to be appointed as Secretary of Transportation and Communications, replacing the outgoing Secretary Jose de Jesus, who had resigned earlier. He took office on June 30, 2011. His appointment was given unanimous consent by the Commission on Appointments on October 12, 2011.

On August 31, 2012, President Aquino appointed him as Secretary of the Interior and Local Government, replacing Jesse Robredo, who had died in a plane crash on the shores of Masbate Island thirteen days earlier. It was Roxas who announced the death of Robredo and confirmed that the rescue operations for the two pilots, Captain Jessup Bahinting and Nepalese flight student Kshitiz Chand, had been turned into a retrieval operation.

On August 3, 2015, Roxas officially tendered his resignation as Secretary of the Interior and Local Government in order to focus on his presidential campaign. In his resignation letter to President Aquino, he once again thanked him for his endorsement and vowed to "begin the process of turning over in an orderly manner all the matters pending in my office." During his final flag ceremony at Camp Crame, Roxas bade goodbye to his colleagues and thanked the members of the Philippine National Police. "It has been my pleasure and a great honor to serve with you I give you my snappy salute", he told police officials present.

== Presidential bid ==
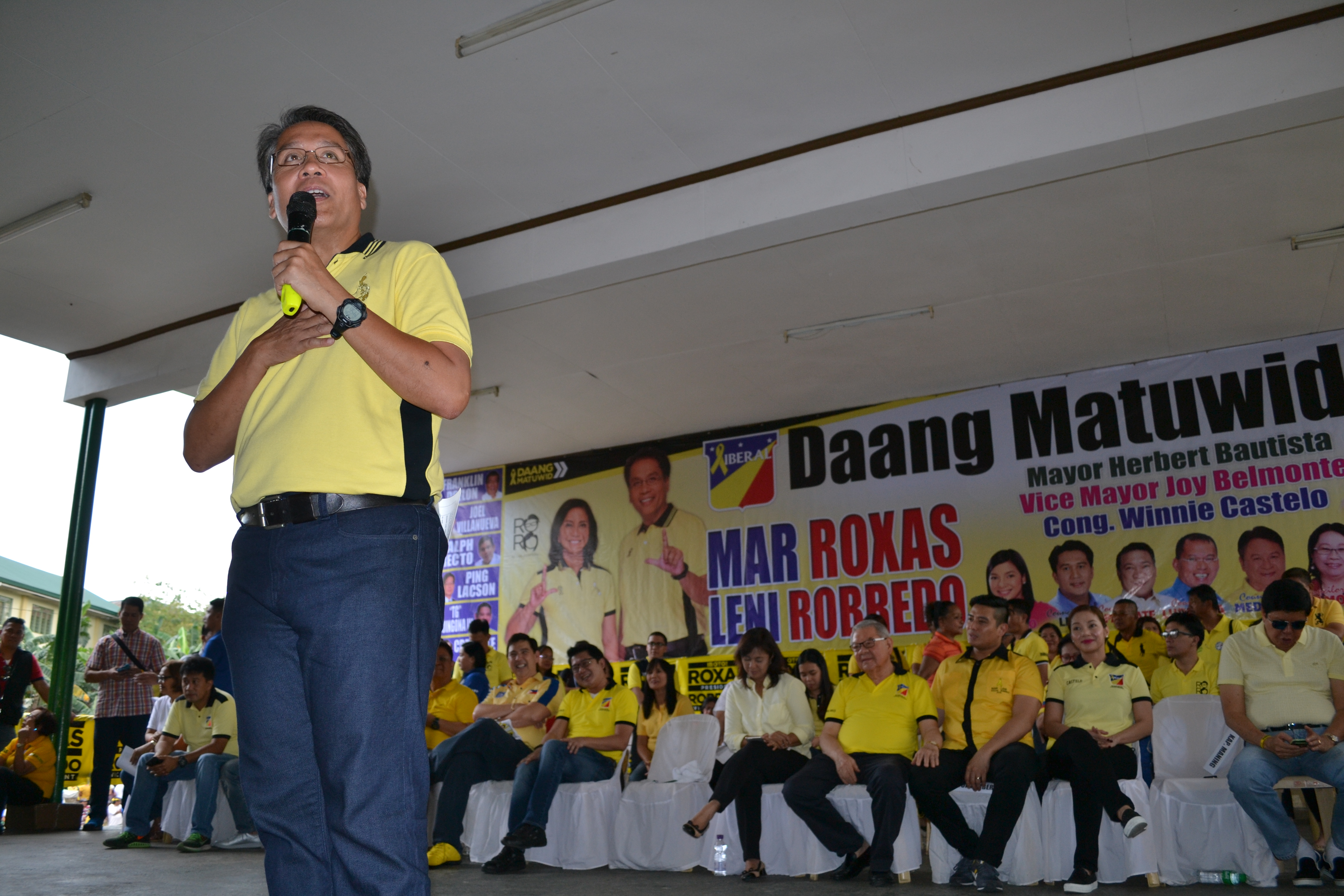
Roxas during a campaign rally of the LP in Quezon City, February 17, 2016

Roxas is the Liberal Party's standard bearer in the 2016 presidential election. On July 31, 2015, at an event dubbed as "A Gathering of Friends", Roxas formally accepted his party's nomination after he was officially endorsed by President Benigno Aquino III in the presence of their political allies at the Club Filipino, where Roxas had announced his decision to withdraw from the 2010 presidential election and give way to Aquino's presidential bid. Aquino also announced his candidacy there on September 9, 2009. In an emotional speech, Roxas declared that he would not deviate from the "straight path" initiated by Aquino in the fight against poverty and corruption. On the same day, Roxas formally launched his campaign website.

In a speech during which he paid tribute to his late grandfather, President Manuel Roxas, his late father, Senator Gerardo Roxas and late brother, Rep. Dinggoy Roxas, Roxas declared that he would not betray the reforms initiated by the Aquino administration and vowed to continue Aquino's "Daang Matuwid" agenda:

I believe that this is not just about me or PNoy. The "Daang Matuwid" is about the dreams of every Filipino. As the President said: It is worth fighting for. It is worth sacrificing for, and dying for if need be. The Straight Path transcends me and PNoy; it is a Filipino ideal that has been there long before we were born, and will remain long after we are gone. History is challenging us to live up to these principles; to continue on this journey; to fight for our dreams as a nation. Mr. President, during your SONA on Monday, you said, "This is only the beginning; it is only the beginning of the great story of the Filipino people." Today, with all my sincerity, with all my will and with all my strength, I am answering the call of the "Daang Matuwid". We will fight on. I am Mar Roxas and I accept the challenge of our Bosses: to continue, expand and fight for the "Daang Matuwid".

As confetti filled the Cory Aquino Kalayaan Hall and singer-songwriter Noel Cabangon sang "Dapat Ang Pangulo", the official song of the campaign, Aquino raised Roxas' hand after the speech as a sign of complete support for his campaign.

== Comeback attempt and political retirement ==
On October 15, 2018, Roxas announced his return to politics after a two-year hiatus, filing his Certificate of Candidacy the next day for Senator in the 2019 Philippine Senate election. He was named to the Otso Diretso opposition coalition. However, he ranked 16th in that election and failed to secure a six-year term.

In an interview with Sa Totoo Lang on One PH on August 26, 2021, Roxas stated that he is retired from politics, saying that he does not have communications with the 1Sambayan opposition coalition. He would later endorse the unsuccessful presidential bid of his 2016 running mate, Vice President Leni Robredo, in the 2022 elections.

On April 15, 2023, Roxas appeared on the commemoration of his grandfather Manuel Roxas’ 75th death anniversary in Roxas City, wherein he also met with Vice President Sara Duterte and former President and incumbent Pampanga Representative Gloria Macapagal Arroyo. On October 6, 2023, Roxas was spotted meeting with President Bongbong Marcos during a distribution of smuggled rice to beneficiaries in Roxas City. Marcos stated in his speech that they remained friends despite their political differences, noting that their friendship began during their time in New York. In September 2024, Roxas was named as the head of the advisory council of the newly launched One Capiz local political party.

Roxas currently serves as president of Progressive Development Corporation.

== Personal life ==
Roxas was previously in a relationship with former beauty queen Maricar Zaldarriaga, with whom he has a son, Paolo Gerardo. Paolo ran for representative of Capiz's 1st congressional district in the 2025 elections, but lost to then-incumbent Pinuno Partylist representative Howard Guintu.

In 2002, he met Korina Sanchez, a news anchor from ABS-CBN. In the April 25, 2009, episode of the ABS-CBN noontime show Wowowee where Sanchez appeared as a guest co-host alongside Willie Revillame, Sanchez and Roxas announced their engagement. Sanchez took a leave of absence from her duties at ABS-CBN in May 2009. They married on October 27, 2009, at a ceremony at Santo Domingo Church in Quezon City, where Roxas' former running mate in the 2010 election, then-Senator (later President) Benigno Aquino III, was one of the couple's primary wedding sponsors. The Manila Philharmonic Orchestra and the Philippine Madrigal Singers provided the music during the wedding. Other notable performers included Basil Valdez, Robert Seña, and Jamie Rivera. The couple owns a black Labrador Retriever and two schnauzer dogs.

As of 2014, he has a declared net worth of ₱202.08 million.

In 2019, they announced the birth of their twins through surrogacy named Pepe Ramon Gerardo Manuel Denzel and Pilar Judith Celia Ester Korina.

== Public image ==
Roxas has been a frequent target of numerous hoaxes in social media, notably from rival political groups such as supporters of Rodrigo Duterte. These were mostly intended to mock his Mr. Palengke image, which has been increasingly viewed as insincere due to his wealthy background. A notable incident is an image presenting Roxas holding a plate, supposedly to collect drink water from a water pump, which was circulated as early as 2015. The image became viral ahead of both elections in 2016 and 2019.

Another image shows a barong tagalog-clad Roxas on board an MRT train that, although not manipulated, was often misrepresented as a recent picture as of 2018.

== Awards ==
- 1996: Roxas was recognized by the World Economic Forum as "one of the Global Leaders of Tomorrow who are expected to shape the future."
- 1999: Roxas was named by the Asiaweek Magazine as "Political Leader of the New Millennium."
- 2002: The Singapore Government has awarded Roxas as the 16th Lee Kuan Yew Exchange Fellow.
- February 16, 2007: E-Services Philippines awarded Roxas with the E-Champion Award recognizing his pioneering efforts and leadership in making the Philippines a popular outsourcing destination of choice.
- July 15, 2009: Roxas was awarded by the Contact Center Association of the Philippines (CCAP) for his pioneering contributions to the Philippine BPO industry.
- September 18, 2007: Roxas was conferred with the Palanca Awards Gawad Dangal ng Lahi by CP Group Chairman Carlos Palanca III, Palanca Foundation Director General Sylvia Palanca-Quirino and Deputy Director General Christine Quirino-Pacheco for serving as an exemplary leader and role model to the Filipino.
- September 12, 2013: The Province of Bulacan recognized Roxas as the 6th Natatanging Dangal ng Lipi Awardee, the province's highest recognition, for his outstanding contributions to government service.
- February 8, 2016: Roxas received the Gawad Bagonhon Award for government service, during the 50th anniversary of the city charter of Bago, Negros Occidental.
- November 27, 2018: Roxas was awarded the Freedom Flame Award by the Friedrich Naumann Foundation in recognition of his advanced democratic ideals.

== Electoral history ==
Electoral history of Mar Roxas
Year	Office	Party	Votes received				Result
Year	Office	Party	Total	%	P.	Swing	Result
1993	Representative (Capiz–1st)	Liberal	67,688	100%	1st	—N/a	Unopposed
1995	Representative (Capiz–1st)	Liberal	80,369	100%	1st	—N/a	Unopposed
1998	Representative (Capiz–1st)	Liberal	78,844	62.84%	1st	-37.16	Won
2004	Senator of the Philippines	Liberal	19,372,888	54.56%	1st	—N/a	Won
2019	Senator of the Philippines	Liberal	9,843,288	20.81%	16th	-33.75	Lost
2010	Vice President of the Philippines	Liberal	13,918,490	39.58%	2nd	—N/a	Lost
2016	President of the Philippines	Liberal	9,978,175	23.45%	2nd	—N/a	Lost

House of Representatives of the Philippines
Preceded by Gerardo Roxas Jr.	Member of the House of Representatives from Capiz's 1st district 1992–2000	Succeeded by Rodriguez Dadivas
Preceded by Rodolfo Albano	Majority Leader of the House of Representatives; 1998–2000	Succeeded by Eduardo Gullas
Political offices
Preceded by Jose Pardo	Secretary of Trade and Industry; 2000–2003	Succeeded by Cesar Purisima
Preceded by Jose de Jesus	Secretary of Transportation and Communications; 2011–2012	Succeeded by Joseph Emilio Abaya
Preceded by Jesse Robredo	Secretary of the Interior and Local Government; 2012–2015	Succeeded by Mel Senen Sarmiento
Party political offices
Preceded by Franklin Drilon	President of the Liberal Party; 2007–2012	Succeeded by Joseph Emilio Abaya
Vacant Title last held by Sergio Osmeña III	Liberal Party nominee for Vice President of the Philippines; 2010	Succeeded by Leni Robredo
Preceded by Benigno Aquino III	Liberal Party nominee for President of the Philippines; 2016	Most recent
