= Mar Roxas 2016 presidential campaign =

Second presidential campaign attempt of Mar Roxas

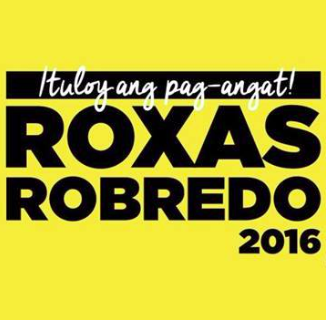
- Campaign: 2016 Philippine presidential election
- Candidate: Manuel Roxas II; Secretary of the Interior and Local Government (2012 – 2015); Secretary of Transport and Communications (2011 – 2012); Senator of the Philippines (2004 – 2010); Secretary of Trade and Industry (2000 – 2003); Capiz's 1st district representative (1993 – 2000); Leni Robredo; Camarines Sur's Third District Congresswoman (2013 – 2016)
- Affiliation: Koalisyon ng Daang Matuwid: Akbayan; CIBAC; Coop-NATCCO; Liberal
- Status: Announced: July 31, 2015; Official launch: July 31, 2015; Lost election: May 9, 2016
- Headquarters: Expo Centro, Araneta Center, EDSA Cubao, Quezon City
- Key people: Benigno Aquino III (President of the Philippines and Liberal Party chairman); Franklin Drilon (President of the Senate of the Philippines and Liberal Party vice-chairman); Feliciano Belmonte, Jr. (Speaker of the House of Representatives of the Philippines and Liberal Party vice-chairman); Joseph Emilio Abaya (Liberal Party President); Mel Senen Sarmiento (Liberal Party Secretary-General); Florencio Abad (2010 campaign manager); Edwin Lacierda (2010 campaign spokesperson); Edgar Erice (Liberal Party Chair for Political Affairs); Korina Sanchez; Ralph Recto; Vilma Santos
- Slogan(s): Ituloy ang Daang Matuwid (lit. Continue the Straight Path)
- Chant: Oras Na, Roxas Na! (lit. It's Time, Roxas Now!)

Website
- www.marroxas.com

The 2016 presidential campaign of Manuel "Mar" Roxas II, former Senator of the Philippines and former Secretary of the Interior and Local Government was announced on July 31, 2015. At an event dubbed as "A Gathering of Friends", Mar Roxas formally accepted his party's nomination as the Liberal Party standard bearer after he was officially endorsed by President Benigno Aquino III in the presence of their political allies at the Club Filipino.

Roxas later placed second in the election, losing to Rodrigo Duterte.

In 2009, it was also in Club Filipino that Roxas had announced his decision to withdraw from the 2010 presidential election and give way to Aquino's presidential bid. Aquino also announced his candidacy there on September 9, 2009. On the same day as the announcement, Roxas formally launched his campaign website. As an erstwhile candidate for president and eventual candidate for vice president as Aquino's running mate, Roxas' candidacy in 2016 was his second attempt at running for higher office.

== Background ==
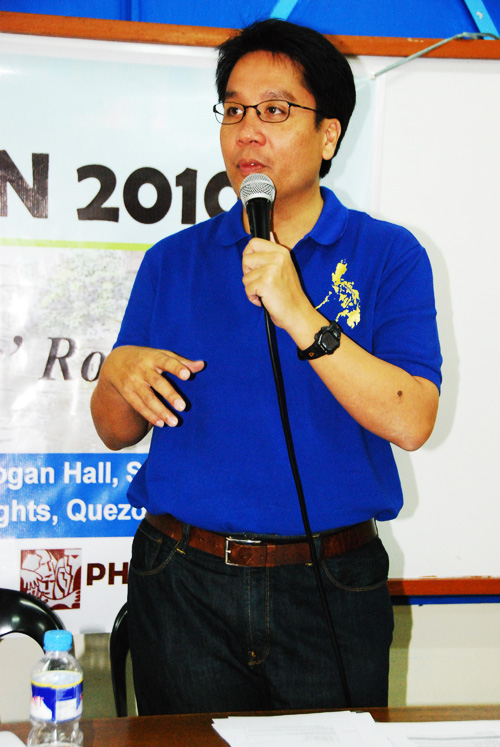
Mar Roxas

After his election to the Senate in 2004, Roxas was immediately seen as a potential presidential candidate in the 2010 presidential election. While Roxas himself was coy on his plans, the Mar Roxas for President movement gathered steam with the Liberal Party targeting the youth in the run-up to the election. Other signs included the sprouting of Mar Roxas for President spots on the internet and his colleagues endorsing him as the party's standard bearer. Then Senator Benigno Aquino III declared him as the Liberal Party's nominee and former senator Jovito Salonga, chairman emeritus of the party, once introduced him as "the next President of the Philippine Republic." Senator Franklin Drilon had also confirmed that Roxas was the party's standard bearer in the election.

However, on September 1, 2009, at the historic Club Filipino, Roxas delivered a speech at a press conference announcing his decision to withdraw from the race and support the candidacy of Aquino for the presidency. Aquino officially launched his campaign eight days later. On September 21, 2009, Roxas, alongside Aquino, officially announced his candidacy for the vice presidency as the nominee of the Liberal Party for vice president, launching the Aquino-Roxas campaign. On November 28, 2009, Aquino and Roxas filed their certificate of candidacy for president and vice president respectively.

He was defeated by Makati Mayor Jejomar Binay of the Partido Demokratiko Pilipino-Lakas ng Bayan (PDP–Laban), a guest running mate for then-defeated Pwersa ng Masang Pilipino (PMP) presidential bet Joseph Estrada, a deposed president who convicted a massive corruption in the previous year by the narrowest margin in the history of the Fifth Republic. Binay's upset victory over Roxas was attributed to the success of the Aquino-Binay campaign, which began when Senator Francis Escudero endorsed Aquino and Binay as president and vice president respectively. This was done without the consent of the two candidates, especially since Escudero, Binay, and Aquino all came from different political parties. Roxas filed an electoral protest to the Supreme Court of the Philippines at the Presidential Electoral Tribunal. On July 12, 2010, the Supreme Court after reviewing Roxas' electoral protest, declared it sufficient in form and substance and the Presidential Electoral Tribunal sent summons to Vice President Binay to file a comment within 10 days upon receipt of the summons.

Roxas also requested the Presidential Electoral Tribunal to order an independent forensic examination of the 26,000 compact flash cards and the source code of the PCOS machines used in the 2010 elections. As of August 2015, the case remained in the pre-trial stage, with the last action taken by the tribunal dating back to December 2012.

Roxas accepted Aquino's offer to be appointed as Secretary of Transportation and Communications, replacing the outgoing Secretary Jose de Jesus, who had resigned earlier. He took office on June 30, 2011. His appointment was given unanimous consent by the Commission on Appointments on October 12, 2011.

On August 31, 2012, President Aquino appointed him as Secretary of the Interior and Local Government, replacing Jesse Robredo, who had died in a plane crash on the shores of Masbate Island thirteen days earlier. It was Roxas who announced the death of Robredo and confirmed that the rescue operations for the two pilots, Captain Jessup Bahinting and Nepalese flight student Kshitiz Chand, had been turned into a retrieval operation.

== Campaign ==
Senate President Franklin Drilon, when describing the Liberal Party's plans for Interior Secretary Mar Roxas in 2016, told the media in January 2013 that "so far as the LP is concerned, [and] in so far as I am concerned, we believe that he is best qualified for 2016." Two years later, Drilon told DZIQ AM radio that Roxas had expressed his interest internally within the party. Several Liberal Party stalwarts had by then expressed that Roxas should declare his intentions at that time, with some such as Budget Secretary Florencio Abad suggesting that Roxas may slide down to run for the vice presidency again.

In the months leading up to Roxas' campaign launch, Senator Grace Poe emerged in opinion polling as a leading presidential candidate. Similar to Roxas' Senate victory in 2004, Poe, who was part of Aquino's mid-term Senate slate, had received the highest number of votes in the 2013 Senate election and was immediately seen as a potential presidential nominee of the Liberal-led coalition. In the Pulse Asia opinion poll conducted between May 30 and June 5, 2015, Poe emerged as the front-runner in the choice for president, overtaking Vice President Binay for the first time, who consistently had a commanding lead over the other candidates, including Roxas, ever since he announced his own presidential candidacy in 2011. Roxas' often dismal showing in opinion polls emboldened some members of the Liberal Party to call on Aquino to endorse Poe as his preferred candidate instead.

Between May and July 2015, President Aquino held various talks with Roxas, Poe and Senator Francis Escudero, including a July meeting with all three present at Bahay Pangarap, Aquino's official residence in the Malacañang Palace complex, to discuss their plans for the upcoming election. Poe and Escudero, both independents but allied with Aquino, had hinted at running for president and vice president, separate from the Liberal Party, prior to the meeting. Aquino expressed his wish in having a "united ticket" and that the broad coalition that had helped elect him in 2010 would remain intact, although according to Poe, there were "no specific commitments or positions mentioned." Aquino last met with Poe on July 20, 2015, a meeting that lasted for five hours. Many members of the Liberal Party have publicly stated their desire for Poe to run as Roxas' vice presidential candidate.

President Aquino delivered his final State of the Nation Address before a joint session of the Congress of the Philippines on July 27, 2015. During his speech, Aquino publicly praised Roxas for his accomplishments as Interior Secretary, which was seen as a prelude to a possible endorsement from him. To the raucous cheers and applause of members of Congress, the widescreens inside the Batasang Pambansa showed a live shot of Binay, Poe and Roxas together as Aquino discussed the 2016 election. Speculation had been mounting prior to the speech that Aquino would announce his choice for president shortly after.

Days after Aquino's speech, officials from both Malacañang and the Liberal Party, notably Rep. Edgar Erice, the Liberal Party's chairman for Political Affairs, confirmed that Aquino would anoint Roxas as his possible successor "before the end of the week." Sources from the Liberal Party told the media that the event would take place on July 31, 2015, at the Club Filipino in San Juan, the same venue where Aquino and Roxas had begun their campaigns for the presidency and vice presidency in 2010.

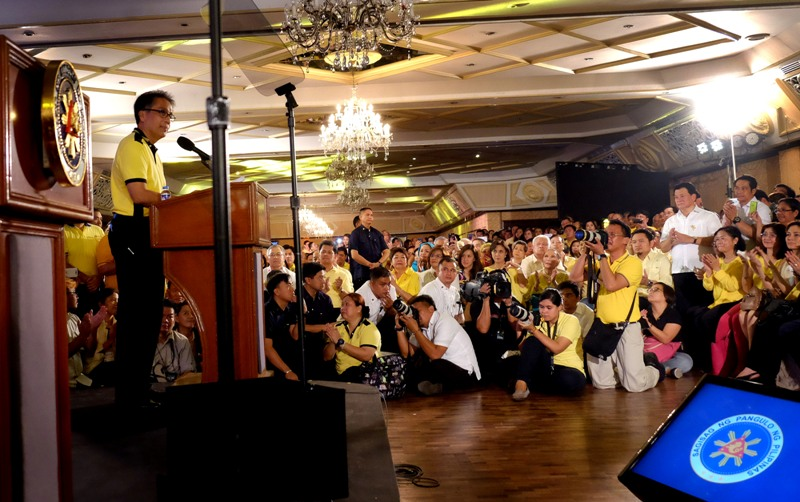
Roxas delivering his acceptance speech at the Club Filipino on July 31, 2015.

On July 31, 2015, Roxas officially launched his presidential campaign at Club Filipino before supporters and political allies. In a speech during which he formally endorsed Roxas as his preferred successor, Aquino laid out his reasons for supporting him, citing his "integrity" and commitment to "real change." He also took the opportunity to blast critics whom he accused of leading an organized campaign to discredit Roxas, especially during the aftermath of Super Typhoon Yolanda. "My bosses, I am telling you now," Aquino concluded, "who, in my opinion, has proven his worth and has integrity; the person who is ready to continue the "Daang Matuwid": That person is none other than Mar Roxas.

In an emotional speech during which he paid tribute to his late grandfather, President Manuel Roxas, his late father, Senator Gerardo Roxas and late brother, Rep. Dinggoy Roxas, Roxas declared that he would not betray the reforms initiated by the Aquino administration and vowed to continue Aquino's "Daang Matuwid" agenda:

I believe that this is not just about me or PNoy. The "Daang Matuwid" is about the dreams of every Filipino. As the President said: It is worth fighting for. It is worth sacrificing for, and dying for if need be. The Straight Path transcends me and PNoy; it is a Filipino ideal that has been there long before we were born, and will remain long after we are gone. History is challenging us to live up to these principles; to continue on this journey; to fight for our dreams as a nation. Mr. President, during your SONA on Monday, you said, "This is only the beginning; it is only the beginning of the great story of the Filipino people." Today, with all my sincerity, with all my will and with all my strength, I am answering the call of the "Daang Matuwid". We will fight on. I am Mar Roxas and I accept the challenge of our Bosses: to continue, expand and fight for the "Daang Matuwid".

As confetti filled the Cory Aquino Kalayaan Hall and singer-songwriter Noel Cabangon sang "Dapat Ang Pangulo", the official song of the campaign, Aquino raised Roxas' hand after the speech as a sign of complete support for his campaign.

On August 3, 2015, Roxas officially tendered his resignation as Secretary of the Interior and Local Government in order to focus on his presidential campaign. In his resignation letter to President Aquino, he once again thanked him for his endorsement and vowed to "begin the process of turning over in an orderly manner all the matters pending in my office." During his final flag ceremony at Camp Crame, Roxas bade goodbye to his colleagues and thanked the members of the Philippine National Police. "It has been my pleasure and a great honor to serve with you I give you my snappy salute", he told police officials present. On September 11, 2015, Roxas formally turned over his post as DILG Secretary to former Samar 1st District Representative Mel Senen Sarmiento.

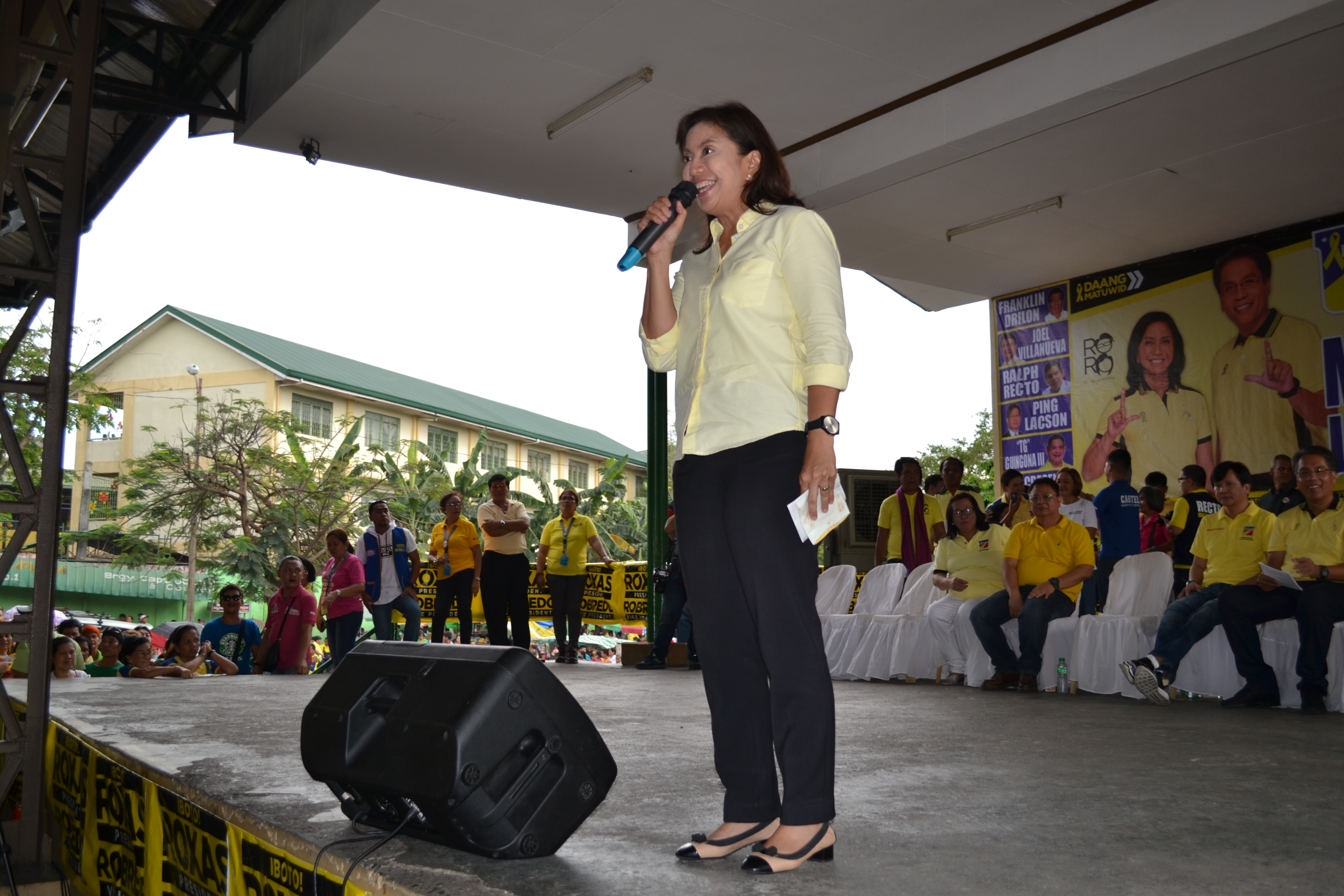
Robredo delivering a speech in an LP campaign rally in Quezon City on February 17, 2016.

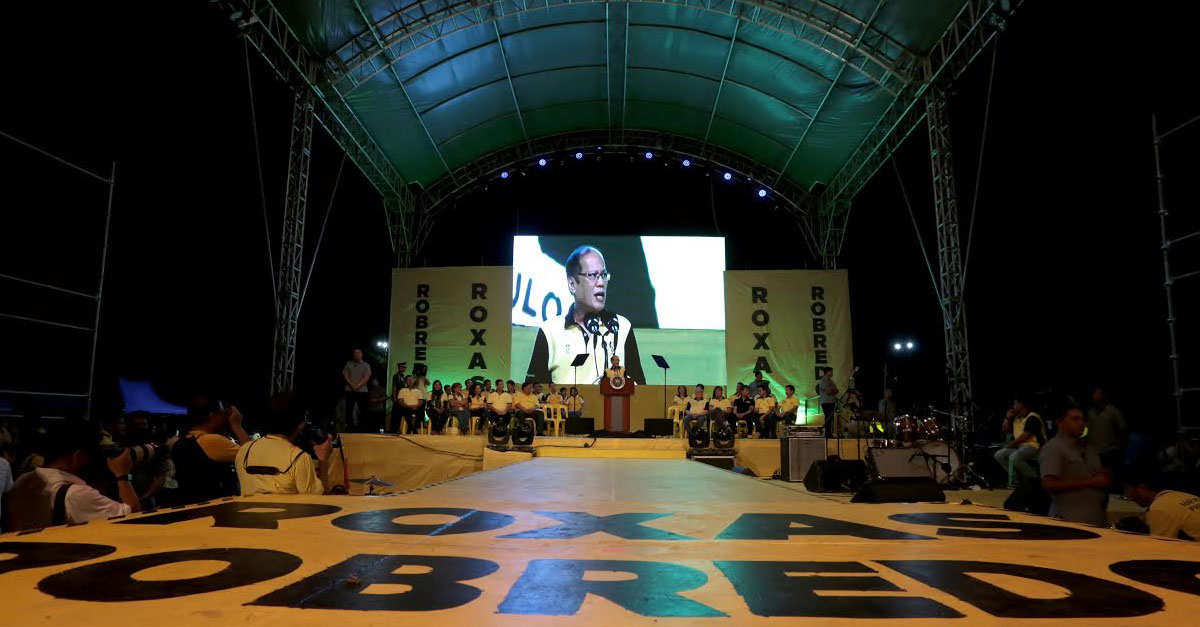
President Aquino at the Miting de Avance for the Koalisyong Daang Matuwid held at the Quezon Memorial Circle during the last day of the official campaign period on May 7, 2016.

After Roxas had officially announced his candidacy in July 2015, he confirmed that he was actively seeking Senator Grace Poe as his running mate. The possibility of a Roxas-Poe campaign further dwindled as Poe made clear her intention to run as an independent candidate and to break with the coalition in meetings held between May and July 2015 with President Aquino, Roxas and her eventual running mate, Senator Francis Escudero. With Poe having announced her presidential bid on September 16, 2015, Roxas has confirmed that he is choosing between three possible alternative candidates:

- Alan Peter Cayetano – Senator of the Philippines and a leading member of the Nacionalista Party
- Maria Leonor Gerona "Leni" Robredo – Camarines Sur's Third District Representative and widow of the late DILG Secretary Jesse Robredo
- Vilma Santos-Recto – Governor of Batangas and a member of the Liberal Party

According to Rep. Edgar Erice, the Liberal Party will hold a national convention on September 28, 2015, where they will finalize their choice for Roxas' vice presidential nominee and officially present their complete Senate slate.

On September 28, 2015, LP held its National Convention at its headquarters at Expo Centro, Cubao, Quezon City, where the National Executive Council approved the nomination of Roxas as its presidential candidate. Roxas was also given the right to choose his running mate.

On October 5, 2015, Roxas chose incumbent Camarines Sur 3rd District Representative Leni Robredo, widow of former DILG Secretary Jesse Robredo as his vice presidential candidate at the Club Filipino where she accepted.

Marikina Rep. Romero "Miro" Quimbo and Akbayan Rep. Ibarra "Barry" Gutierrez are the spokespersons of the campaign, while House Speaker Feliciano Belmonte, Jr. is the campaign manager.

The campaign of both Roxas and Robredo started with a proclamation rally held in Capiz on February 9, 2016, with President Aquino led the attendees of the rally.

== Platform ==
In his presidential campaign, Mar Roxas vowed to relentlessly continue the “Daang Matuwid” (Straight Path) and sustain the policies that have been implemented by the administration of President Benigno Aquino III, whose term will end in 2016. According to Edwin Lacierda, who serves as the presidential spokesman of President Aquino, the current administration claims that these policies have contributed a lot to the development of the country. Roxas further commits to expand and refine these existing policies, if needed, in order to make an economic, social, and political impact, which are significant, to the growth of the Philippines in the next six years.

=== Economic platform ===
As endorsed by the Liberal Party, Roxas planned to resume performing the following economic platforms:

- To discourage and totally dampen the creation of conditions by the private sector and the government that may hinder the growth and competitiveness of private businesses, which include the small, medium, and big enterprises;
- To create more domestic jobs so that working abroad will not be a necessity, but rather a choice for Filipino citizens; and when a Filipino opts to become an overseas Filipino worker (OFW), his/her welfare and protection will still be guaranteed by the government;
- To make amendments to the existing trade policies, which govern the exports and imports sector of the country, in order to promote openness and sustainable growth for the Philippines;
- To consider the problems arising from the rural economy as important; for instance, a problem emerges when failure to recognize farms and other rural enterprises as significant in obtaining food security and more equitable economic growth exists; so one way to address this issue is to reform the incentives given to this type of economy;
- To make efficient partnerships with the private sector in order to execute well all the laws pertaining to land and ownership;
- To continue and expand the anti-poverty program initiated by the Aquino administration so that there will be more opportunities for the poor and marginalized people in the Philippines, aimed at alleviating poverty in the country.

Under these economic plans, growth spurt does not seem the only agenda of Roxas in his presidential bid, but also the development of the welfare of the Filipinos. Elaborating further on the given platforms above, Roxas already has concrete actions on what he will do if he gets elected. For the rural community, there is already the Bottom-up Budgeting Program which seeks to provide necessities and other essential things needed by the locality in order to have a sustainable life. Moreover, this initiates projects to bring up beneficial outcomes to people and their environment in rural areas. Roxas will also continue tapping the business process outsourcing (BPO) industry to create more available jobs for the entire population. Roxas is often credited for contributing to the growth and expansion of the BPO industry in the Philippines during his tenure as Trade and Industry Secretary under the administration of Gloria Macapagal Arroyo, which allowed him to be dubbed the "Father of the IT-BPO sector". In addition to that, he is also focused in giving the country the chance to have cheaper medicines by making some amendments concerning the local pharmaceutical industries.

As for the other factors that allowed the economy of the Philippines to grow, such as the management in fiscal and monetary policies, Mar Roxas also pledged to make good decisions upon handling these important policies. Moreover, he wants to preserve the current credit rating of the Philippines, which is an investment grade as evaluated by Moody's Group, Standard & Poor's (S&P), and Fitch Ratings, Inc. According to him, President Aquino has done a significant role in lifting up the performance of the government in order to bring progress. So to continue this, Roxas said in an interview that he will pursue in fortifying the balance sheet of the country so that its profit and loss (P&L) income statement would also improve. However, he exclaimed that this would not be possible without having a good governance on fiscal and monetary matters. For instance, in relation to fiscal policy or government expenditure in particular, Roxas assures in his interview that part of his plans in 2016 is the strengthening of public–private partnership projects in order to increase the flow of foreign direct investment, which in turn can reduce the external debt of the Philippines. Specifically, he wants to develop a good blueprint for physical interconnectivity projects, like airports, seaports, other ports, and national infrastructures as these will play an important role in Philippine business.

=== Social and political platforms ===
For the social and political side, Roxas' platforms were the following:

- The further implementation of the Pantawid Pamilyang Pilipino Program (4Ps), which provides conditional cash incentives and other health and education benefits to the poor. With this, he believes that poverty incidence in the country could be reduced to low levels;
- The improvement on disaster risk reduction and management will also be part of Roxas’ target plans;
- He also supports the passage regarding the Basic Bangsamoro Law and eventually wants to resolve disputes occurring in Mindanao in order to lessen possible negative social consequences;
- Roxas vows to fight corruption. Roxas, in his campaign, promises to make the government efficient again by implementing orders and laws with regards to anti-corruption.

== Endorsements ==
Mar Roxas

Presidents of the Philippines

- Benigno Aquino III, 15th president of the Philippines (2010–2016), former senator of the Philippines (2007–2010)

Current and former Philippine senators

- Bam Aquino, Philippine senator and former chairman of the National Youth Commission
- Franklin Drilon, President of the Philippine Senate
- TG Guingona, Philippine senator
- Panfilo Lacson, former Philippine senator and former rehabilitation czar
- Ramon Magsaysay, Jr., former Philippine senator, son of Philippine president Ramon Magsaysay
- Ralph Recto, Philippine senator and current president pro tempore of the Philippine Senate

Current and former Philippine representatives

- Rosemarie Arenas, Philippine Representative from Pangasinan
- Elpidio Barzaga, Jr., Philippine Representative from Cavite, member of the National Unity Party
- Feliciano Belmonte, Jr., Speaker of the Philippine House of Representatives
- Edgar Erice, Philippine Representative from Caloocan
- Jeffrey Ferrer, Philippine Representative from Negros Occidental, member of the National Unity Party
- Juliet Fortuna, Philippine Representative
- Neptali Gonzales II, Philippine Representative
- Risa Hontiveros, former Philippine Representative
- Carol Jayne Lopez, Philippine Representative from YACAP Partylist
- Francisco Matugas, Philippine representative from Surigao del Norte
- Victor Ortega, Philippine representative from La Union
- Leni Robredo, Philippine Representative from Camarines Sur, running mate of Mar Roxas
- Xavier Jesus Romualdo, Philippine Representative from Camiguin
- Sherwin Tugna, Philippine Representative, supporter of Citizens' Battle Against Corruption
- Niel Tupas, Jr., Philippine Representative from Iloilo
- Alfred Vargas, Philippine Representative from Quezon City, former actor
- Gina de Venecia, Philippine Representative from Pangasinan, wife of House Speaker Jose de Venecia, Jr.

Current and former provincial governors and vice governors

- Mamintal Alonto Adiong Jr., Governor of Lanao del Sur
- Dingdong Avanzado, Vice Governor of Siquijor
- Edgar Chatto, Governor of Bohol
- Faustino Dy III, Governor of Isabela
- Hermogenes Ebdane, Governor of Zambales
- Daisy Avance Fuentes, Governor of South Cotabato, supporter of Nationalist People's Coalition
- Esmael Mangudadatu, Governor of Maguindanao
- Ramil Hernandez, Governor of Laguna
- Sol Matugas, Governor of Surigao del Norte
- Lilia Pineda, Governor of Pampanga
- Joey Salceda, Governor of Albay
- Vilma Santos, Governor of Batangas, wife of Ralph Recto
- Wilhelmino Sy-Alvarado, Governor of Bulacan, member of the National Unity Party

Current and former cabinet and government officials

- Karina Constantino-David, former chairwoman of the Civil Service Commission of the Philippines
- Leila de Lima, former secretary of the Department of Justice
- Jericho Petilla, former secretary of the Department of Energy
- Corazon Soliman, secretary of the Department of Social Welfare and Development
- Gio Tingson, National Youth Commission chairman

Mayors and other municipal leaders

- Herbert Bautista, Mayor of Quezon City
- Alfredo Lim, former mayor of Manila
- Vergel Aguilar, Mayor of Las Piñas
- John Bongat, Mayor of Naga City
- Guia Gomez, Mayor of San Juan
- Ernesto Matugas, Mayor of Surigao City
- Mary Jane Ortega, former mayor of San Fernando, La Union
- Pablo Ortega, former mayor of San Fernando, La Union
- Dennis Padilla, actor and former councilor of Caloocan
- Kid Peña, acting mayor of Makati

Celebrities

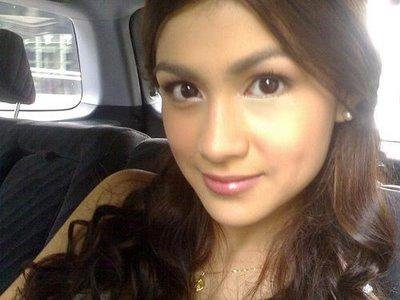
Carla Abellana

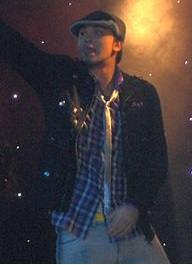
Billy Crawford

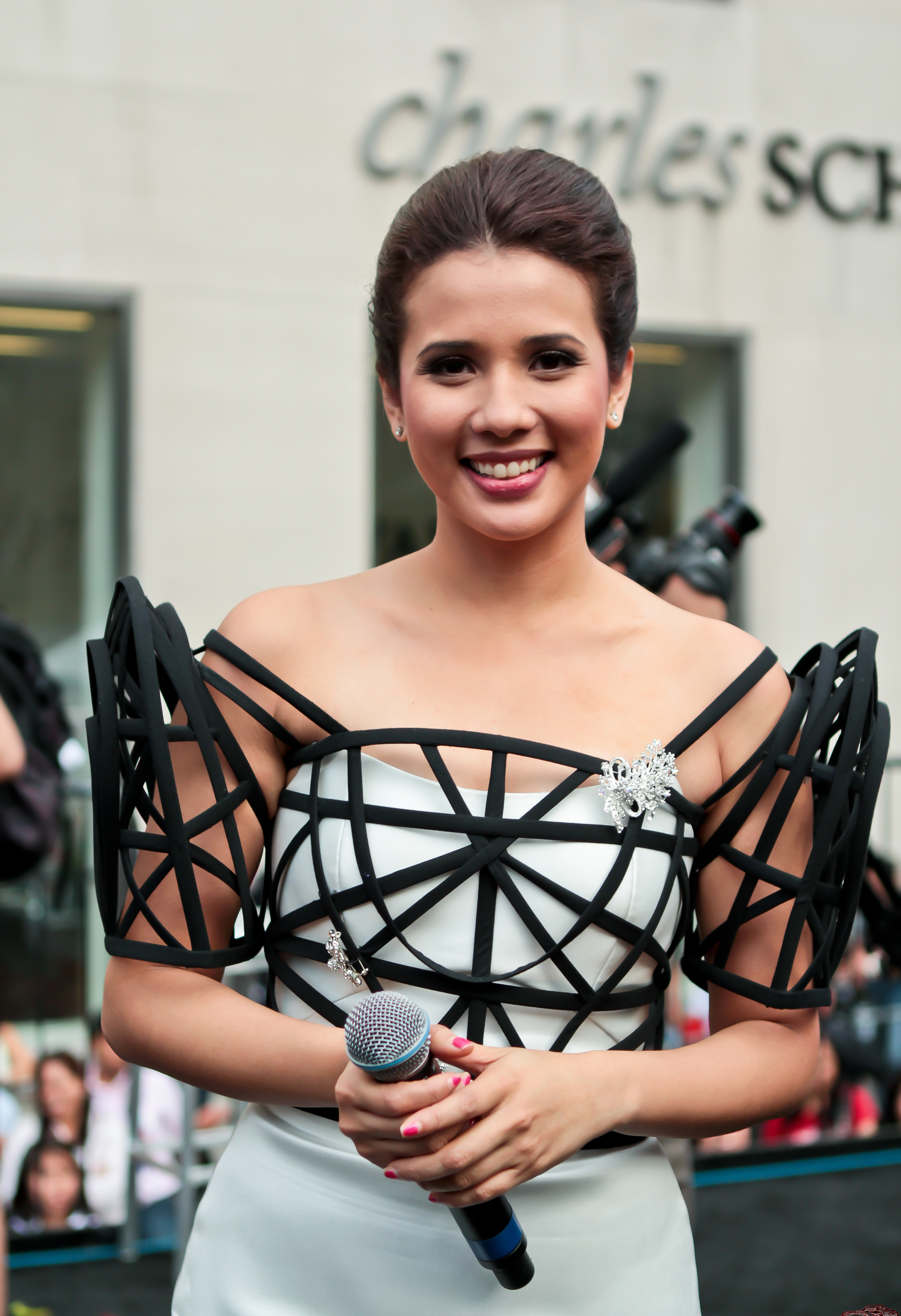
Karylle

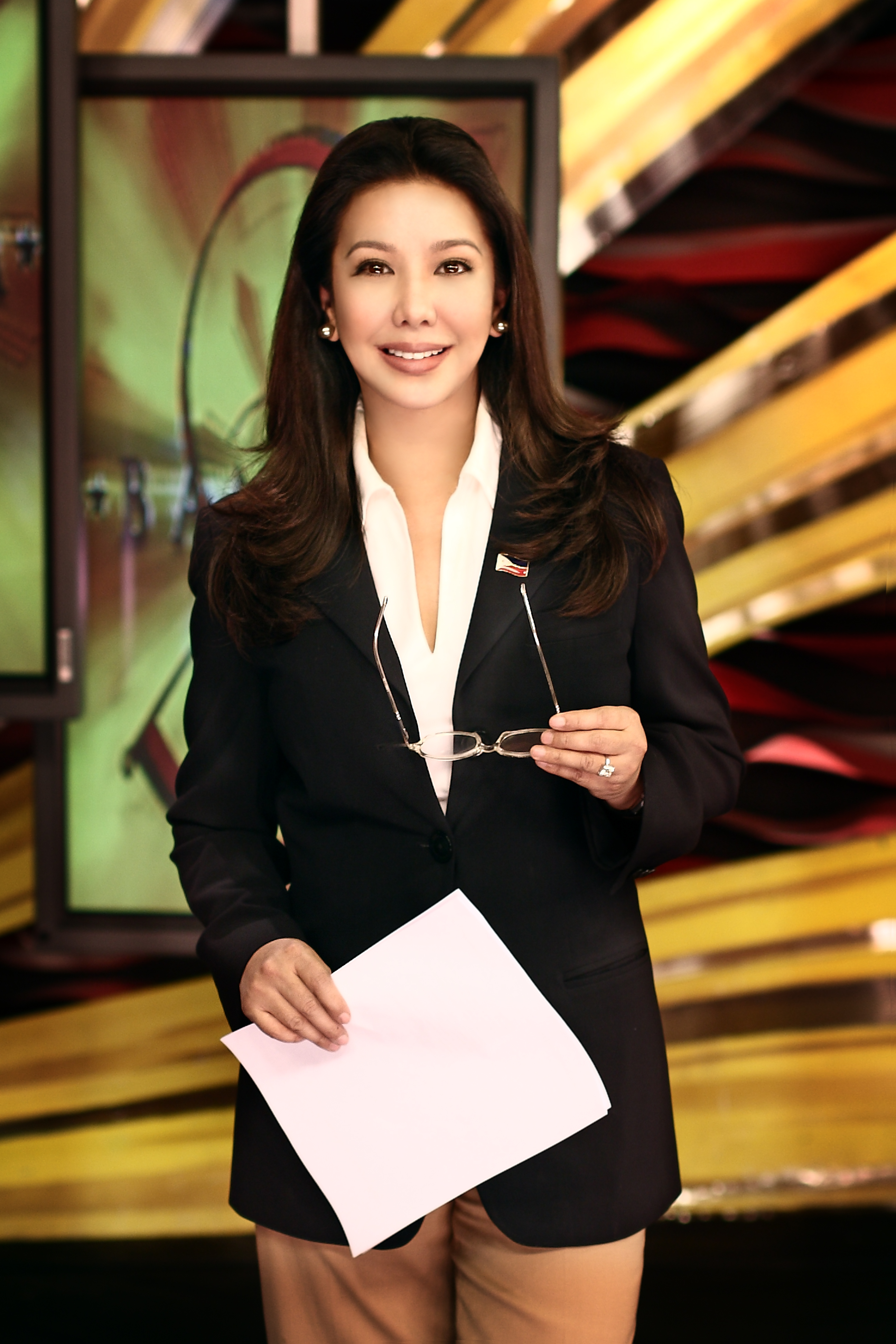
Korina Sanchez, wife of Mar Roxas

- Carla Abellana, actress
- Boy Abunda, TV host
- Vhong Navarro, actor, TV host, singer, and comedian
- Papa Jack, Filipino radio disc jockey and television personality.
- Kris Aquino, actress, TV host, presidential sister
- Ramon Bautista, YouTube sensation, host of "Kontrabando"
- Kathryn Bernardo, actress
- Noel Cabangon, musician, activist
- Melai Cantiveros, comedian
- Chokoleit, comedian
- Billy Crawford, singer, television host
- Paolo Contis, actor
- Bienvenido "Bien" Fernandez, photojournalist
- Angelu de Leon, actress
- Martin del Rosario, actor
- Jason Francisco, comedian
- Beauty Gonzalez, actress
- Janine Gutierrez, actress
- Jay R, singer
- Karylle, singer, TV host
- Lassy, stand-up comedian
- John Lapus, comedian
- Kris Lawrence, singer
- Grace Lee, television host
- MC, stand-up comedian
- KC Montero, television host
- Donita Nose, stand-up comedian
- Leah Navarro, singer, activist
- Daniel Padilla, actor
- Jett Pangan, The Dawn lead vocalist
- Jim Paredes, musician, activist
- John Prats, actor
- Rufa Mae Quinto, actress, comedian
- Rosa Rosal, actress
- Maricel Soriano, actress
- Gary Valenciano, singer
- Richard Yap, actor
- Tim Yap, television host
- Jessa Zaragoza, singer

Sportsmen

- James Yap, basketball player

Businesspeople

- Judy Araneta-Roxas, Vice Chairperson of the Araneta Group, political activist, mother of Mar Roxas
- Lily Monteverde, film producer

Other public figures

- Korina Sanchez, news anchor, wife of Mar Roxas
- Winnie Monsod, economist, broadcaster and columnist

Organizations

- Alliance of Transport Organizations (ACTO)
- Federation of Jeepney Operators and Drivers Association (FEJODAP)
- League of Cities of the Philippines
- Governor's League of the Philippines
- Members Church of God International (Ang Dating Daan)
- Pangkalahatang Sanggunian Manila & Suburbs Drivers Association Nationwide, Inc. (PASANG MASDA)
- Philippine Councilors' League
- Trade Union Congress of the Philippines
- Union of Local Authorities of the Philippines
Leni Robredo

Presidents of the Philippines

- Benigno Aquino III, 15th president of the Philippines (2010–present), former Senator of the Philippines (2007–2010)
- Fidel V. Ramos, 12th president of the Philippines (1992–1998)

Current and former Philippine senators

- Bam Aquino, incumbent senator and former chairman of the National Youth Commission
- Franklin Drilon, 22nd, 24th and 27th President of the Senate (2000, 2001–06, 2013–present)
- TG Guingona, incumbent senator
- Ramon Magsaysay, Jr., former senator, son of former Philippine President Ramon Magsaysay
- Sergio Osmeña III, incumbent senator, Robredo's campaign adviser
- Ralph Recto, incumbent senator and current president pro tempore of the Senate

Current and former Philippine representatives

- Malou Acosta
- Rosemarie Arenas, representative from Pangasinan
- Elpidio Barzaga, Jr., representative from Cavite, member of the National Unity Party
- Feliciano Belmonte, Jr., Speaker of the Philippine House of Representatives
- Edgar Erice, representative from Caloocan
- Jeffrey Ferrer, representative from Negros Occidental, member of the National Unity Party
- Juliet Fortuna, representative
- Neptali Gonzales II, representative of the lone district of Mandaluyong
- Risa Hontiveros, former representative from Akbayan
- Francisco Matugas, representative from Surigao del Norte
- Victor Ortega, representative from La Union
- Rufus Rodriguez, representative from Cagayan de Oro
- Erin Tañada
- Sherwin Tugna, representative, supporter of Citizens' Battle Against Corruption
- Niel Tupas, Jr., representative from Iloilo
- Alfred Vargas, representative, former actor
- Gina de Venecia, representative from Pangasinan, wife of House Speaker Jose de Venecia, Jr.

Current and former provincial governors and vice governors

- Mamintal Alonto Adiong Jr., Governor of Lanao del Sur
- Dingdong Avanzado, Vice Governor of Siquijor
- Daisy Avance Fuentes, Governor of South Cotabato, supporter of Nationalist People's Coalition
- Esmael Mangudadatu, Governor of Maguindanao
- Sol Matugas, Governor of Surigao del Norte
- Eddie Panlilio
- Joey Salceda, Governor of Albay
- Vilma Santos, Governor of Batangas, wife of Ralph Recto
- Wilhelmino Sy-Alvarado, Governor of Bulacan, member of the National Unity Party
- Jose Maria Zubiri, Jr., Governor of Bukidnon

Current and former cabinet officials

- Karina Constantino-David, former chairwoman of the Civil Service Commission of the Philippines
- Leila de Lima, secretary of the Department of Justice
- Jericho Petilla, former secretary of the Department of Energy
- Corazon Soliman, secretary of the Department of Social Welfare and Development
- Ely Quinto, former secretary of the Department of Environment and Natural Resources and lead convenor of "Kilusang "JoLen"

Mayors and other municipal leaders

- Herbert Bautista, Mayor of Quezon City
- John Bongat, Mayor of Naga, Camarines Sur
- Ernesto Matugas, Mayor of Surigao City
- Mary Jane Ortega, former mayor of San Fernando, La Union
- Pablo Ortega, former mayor of San Fernando, La Union
- Dennis Padilla, actor and former councilor of Caloocan
- Romulo "Kid" Peña, Jr., acting mayor of Makati

Other politicians

- Sitti Djalia Turabin, executive director of the National Commission on Muslim Filipinos

Celebrities

- Jana Agoncillo, actress
- LA Aguinaldo, model
- Kris Aquino, actress, TV host, presidential sister
- Jon Avila, actor and model
- John Arcilla, actor
- Phoemela Baranda, actress, TV host, model and president, Professional Models Association of the Philippines (PMAP)
- Bea Binene, actress, television host
- Sharmaine Buencamino, actress
- Tutti Caringal, 6cyclemind singer
- Kim Chiu, actress
- David Chua, actor and model
- Max Collins, actress
- Zeus Collins, actor and dancer
- The Company, singers
- Paolo Contis, actor
- Sharon Cuneta, actress, singer
- Ebe Dancel, Sugarfree vocalist
- Dingdong Dantes, actor, NYC commissioner at-large
- Enchong Dee, actor
- Will Devaughn, actor and model
- Glaiza de Castro, actress
- Angelu de Leon, actress
- Gabby Eigenmann, actor
- Bituin Escalante, singer
- John Estrada, actor
- Rap Fernandez, actor
- Carlo Gonzalez, actor
- Edgar Allan Guzman, actor
- Agot Isidro, actress
- Luke Jickain, actor and model
- Joseph Marco, actor and model
- Zanjoe Marudo, actress, singer
- Melissa Mendez, actress
- Gabe Mercado, comedian
- Angelica Panganiban, actress
- Jim Paredes, musician, activist
- Paolo Paraiso, actor and model
- Paula Peralejo, actress
- Rica Peralejo, actress
- Amy Perez, TV host
- Miko Raval, actor and model
- LJ Reyes, actress
- Marian Rivera, actress
- Raphael Robes, actor and model
- Lea Salonga, Broadway actress, singer
- Maja Salvador, actress, singer
- Victor Silayan, actor and model
- Arthur Solinap, actor
- Maricel Soriano, actress
- Gary Valenciano, singer
- Tim Yap, television host
- Yanni Yuzon, musician

Sportsmen

- Michael Christian Martinez, figure skater
- LA Revilla, basketball player
- Kiefer Ravena, basketball player

Businesspeople

- Judy Araneta-Roxas, Vice Chairperson of the Araneta Group, political activist, mother of Mar Roxas
- Vicki Belo, founder of Belo Medical Group, Inc.
- Peter Coyiuto, owner, president and chief executive officer of First Life Financial Company, Inc.
- Margot Torres, Senior Vice-President for Marketing and Communications, McDonald's Philippines

Family members

- Jessica "Aika" Robredo, daughter
- Patrica "Tricia" Robredo, daughter, former UAAP courtside reporter

Other public figures

- Ballsy Aquino–Cruz, presidential sister
- Joji Dingcong
- Biboy Arboleda, advertising and promotions head of Dreamscape Entertainment
- Deo Endrinal, talent manager of Aquino, Vice Ganda and Diether Ocampo and business unit head of Dreamscape Entertainment
- Keren Pascual, PR mogul and talent manager of Dee
- Korina Sanchez, news anchor, wife of Mar Roxas
- Winnie Monsod, economist, broadcaster and columnist
- Cory Vidanes, ABS-CBN Corporation chief operating officer for broadcast

Organizations

- League of Cities of the Philippines
- Governor's League of the Philippines
- Partido Demokratikong Sosyalista ng Pilipinas
- People’s Movement for Democratic Governance
- Philippine Councilors' League
- Union of Local Authorities of the Philippines

== Senate slate ==
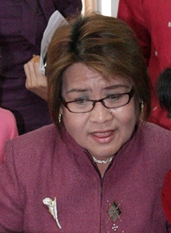
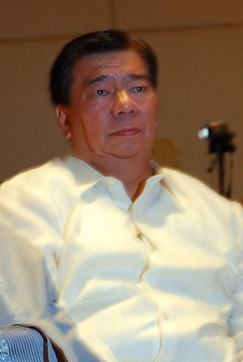
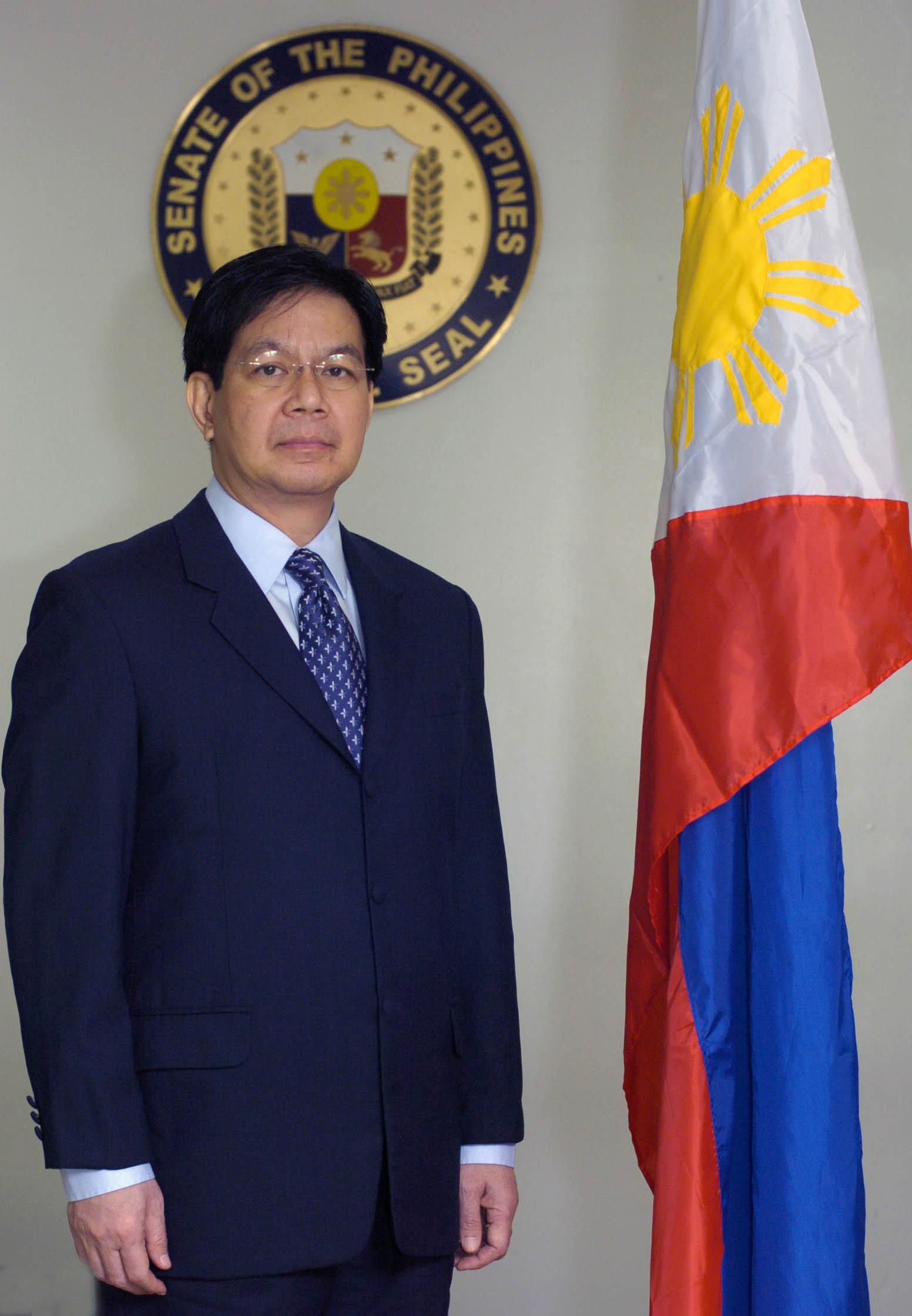
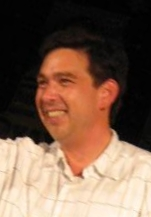
Leila de Lima, Franklin Drilon, Panfilo Lacson, & Ralph Recto

On October 12, 2015, the party announced its complete senatorial line-up at the LP National Headquarters in Quezon City, just before their filing of COCs.

The candidates under the Koalisyon ng Daang Matuwid (Straight Path Coalition) are:

Liberal Party

- Ina Ambolodto (Liberal), Assistant Secretary for Muslim Affairs and Special Concerns in the Department of the Interior and Local Government and former acting governor of Maguindanao
- Leila de Lima (Liberal), former Secretary of Justice and former chairperson of the Commission on Human Rights
- Franklin Drilon (Liberal), Senate President
- TG Guingona (Liberal), chairman of the Philippine Senate Blue Ribbon Committee
- Risa Hontiveros (Akbayan), director/board member of the Philippine Health Insurance Corporation and former party-list representative
- Panfilo Lacson, former presidential assistant for rehabilitation and recovery and former senator
- Mark Lapid (Aksyon), chief operating officer of the Tourism Infrastructure and Enterprise Zone Authority, former governor of Pampanga and son of outgoing senator Lito Lapid
- Cresente Paez (Coop-NATCCO), party-list representative
- Francis Pangilinan (Liberal), former Presidential Assistant for Food Security and Agricultural Modernization and former senator
- Jericho Petilla (Liberal), former Secretary of Energy and former governor of Leyte
- Ralph Recto (Liberal), Senate President pro tempore
- Joel Villanueva (CIBAC), director-general of the Technical Education and Skills Development Authority, former party-list representative and son of televangelist Eddie Villanueva.

== See also ==
- Mar Roxas 2010 presidential campaign
