= Flood control projects scandal in the Philippines =

- Part of corruption in the Philippines
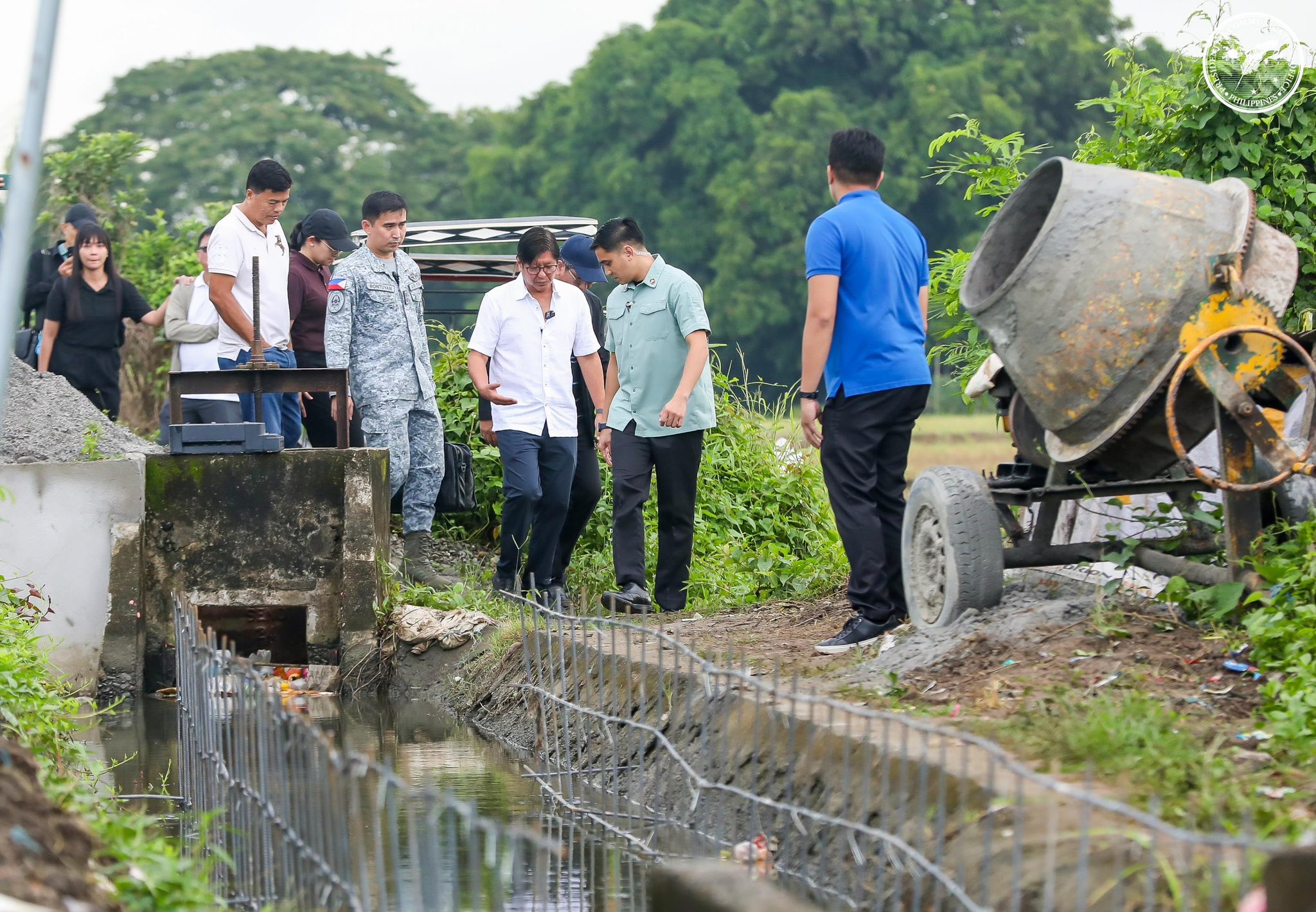
- President Bongbong Marcos (third from right) inspects an unfinished flood control project site in Baliwag, Bulacan, on August 20, 2025
- Duration: 2024–present
- Cause: Alleged ghost projects, (Note: The Bureau of Internal Revenue (BIR) defines ghost projects as government infrastructure projects that are reported in government documents as "completed" and "fully paid," but were never actually constructed.) contractor monopolies, and misallocation of funds
- Outcome: Ongoing Senate inquiry; Suspension of the House of Representatives inquiry; Leadership changes in the Senate and the House of Representatives; Creation of the Independent Commission for Infrastructure (ICI); Philippine anti-corruption protests begin
- Key figures: List of implicated parties in the flood control projects scandal in the Philippines
- Agencies involved: Bureau of Customs (BoC); Bureau of Immigration (BI); Bureau of Internal Revenue (BIR); Commission on Audit (COA); Commission on Elections (COMELEC); Department of Budget and Management (DBM); Department of Justice (DOJ); Department of Public Works and Highways (DPWH)

The flood control projects scandal in the Philippines involves allegations of corruption, mismanagement, and irregularities in government-funded flood control projects in the country. In 2025, it gained national attention after President Bongbong Marcos highlighted alleged anomalies in flood control projects during the 2025 State of the Nation Address. This was followed by inquiries in both chambers of Congress, the creation of the Independent Commission for Infrastructure (ICI), and widespread anti-corruption protests. The scandal concerns billions of pesos in government funding for flood control projects, with allegations of ghost projects, substandard construction, and the repeated awarding of contracts to a small group of contractors.

== Background ==
On July 25, 2025, Cardinal Pablo Virgilio David, the President of the Catholic Bishops Conference of the Philippines, sent a pastoral letter to his diocese stating that alleged corruption in the government had led to flooding in various parts of the Philippines, which affected thousands of people, and publicized internationally in an online Catholic newspaper. He said that government records show more than ₱5 billion (US$101.52 million) allocated to flood control projects in Malabon and Navotas since 2023, but residents in these areas have faced problems with non-functioning floodgates, clogged canals, and poor infrastructure. David also questioned ₱142.7 billion (US$2.9 billion) in alleged "questionable insertions" in the 2025 national budget.

President Bongbong Marcos discussed the flood control project during the 2025 State of the Nation Address.

In his fourth State of the Nation Address (SONA) on July 28, 2025, President Marcos reported that his administration had implemented over 5,500 flood control projects and announced plans for at least ten large-scale projects amounting to more than ₱500 billion (US$10.15 billion) over the next 13 years. The Department of Public Works and Highways (DPWH) justified these projects as urgent measures to mitigate flooding, particularly in Metro Manila and Central Luzon, but admitted that poor waste management practices were aggravating the flooding problem.

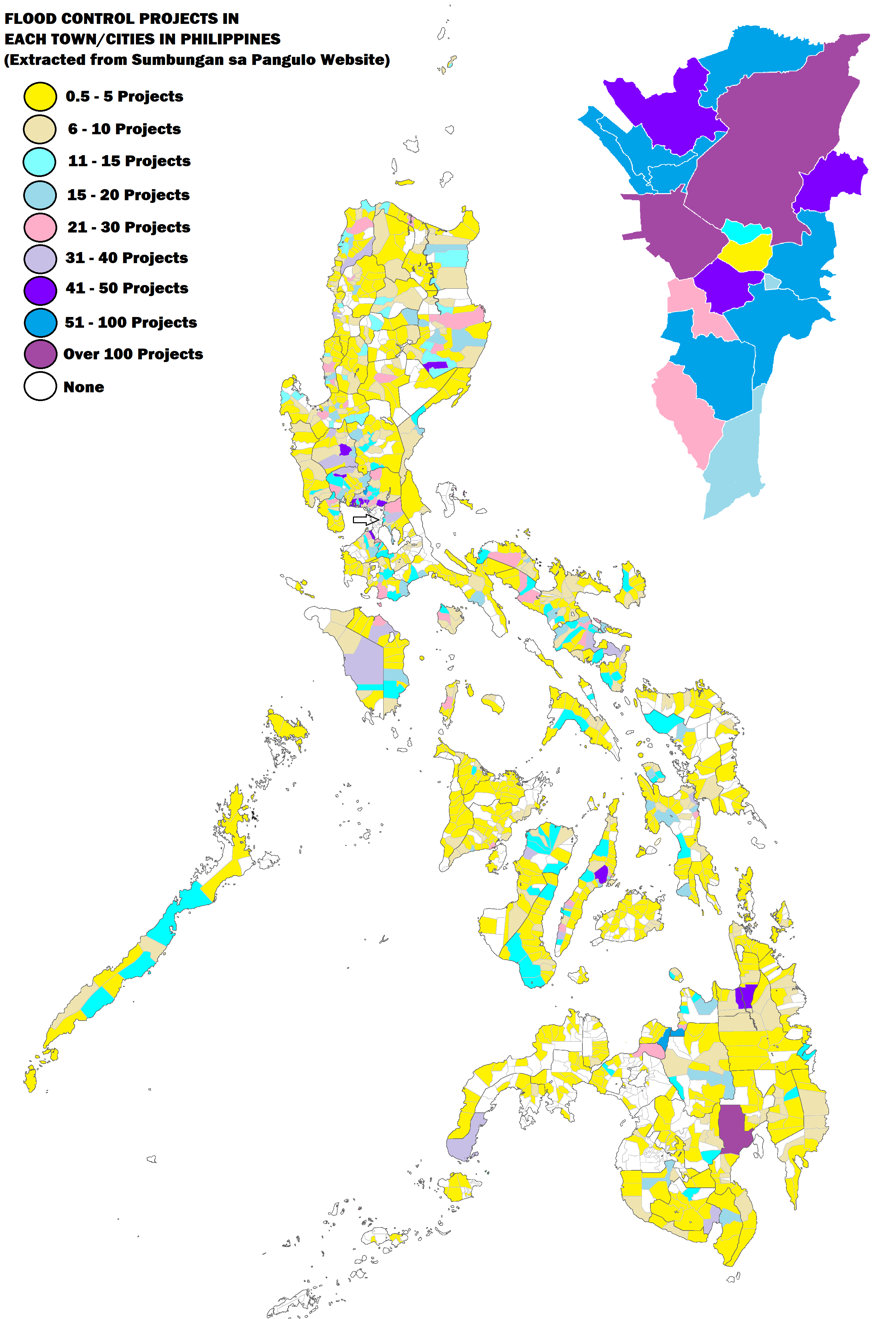
The numbers of flood control projects in each town of the Philippines. Some of the major cities in the Philippines received numerous flood control projects in their jurisdiction.

Marcos later vetoed ₱16.7 billion (US$339.09 million) worth of flood- control projects included in the 2025 national budget, citing redundancy and improper project placement. ACT Teachers Party-list Representative Antonio Tinio questioned why Marcos did not assert his veto powers for the 2023 and 2024 budget.

Senators Sherwin Gatchalian and Ping Lacson and House representatives Renee Co, Chel Diokno, Sarah Elago, and Antonio Tinio questioned the inclusion of unprogrammed funds in the national budget. Unprogrammed appropriations, according to them, have been the source of corruption-laden government projects. The proposed 2026 national budget includes ₱249 billion (US$5.06 billion) in unprogrammed funds, which the lawmakers say will ensure the continuation of corruption in government. In 2023 and 2024, Marcos freed up unprogrammed funds worth ₱214 billion (US$4.35 billion) for "priority" infrastructure projects under DPWH, half of which—₱111 billion (US$2.25 billion)—went to flood control projects.

The Right to Know Right Now Coalition noted how congressional insertions and unprogrammed funds that went into flood-control projects rose significantly in 2023 and 2024, while Martin Romualdez was House Speaker, Zaldy Co was the House Committee on Appropriations chair, Francis Escudero was Senate president, and Joel Villanueva was majority floor leader.

== Allegations of corruption and irregularities ==
=== Senate Blue Ribbon Committee investigation ===
In August 2025, the Senate Blue Ribbon Committee launched a motu proprio investigation dubbed Philippines Under Water into alleged irregularities in flood control projects.

- "Ghost" projects: DPWH officials acknowledged possible "ghost" projects in Bulacan, particularly in Calumpit, Hagonoy, and Malolos, where Wawao Builders reportedly bagged ₱9 billion (US$182.74 million) worth of contracts. According to Justice Secretary Jesus Crispin Remulla, a lawyer provided insight into a ₱5 billion (US$101.52 million) "ghost" project in Central Luzon, suggesting that the contractor could receive up to 40% of the project.
- License renting schemes: Reports emerged that contractor licenses rated triple-A or quadruple-A were being leased to smaller builders, a practice linked to substandard construction output.
- Contractor monopolies: Senators alleged that a small group of contractors had cornered contracts worth around ₱100 billion (US$2.03 billion), raising concerns over competition and transparency. Marcos revealed that only 15 out of 2,409 of the accredited contractors were awarded ₱100 billion, or 18% of the entire ₱545.6 billion (US$11.08 billion) flood mitigation budget allocated by his administration from July 2022 to May 2025.

=== Misallocation and quality issues ===
Senator JV Ejercito criticized the lack of alignment between project funding and actual flood-prone areas, asking for proof of a comprehensive master plan. Senator Erwin Tulfo, the vice chairperson of the Blue Ribbon Committee, described the ₱545.6 billion (US$11.08 billion) flood control program as "a grand robbery," claiming that kickbacks and commissions as high as 25% left only 30–40% of funds for actual construction. Senator Imee Marcos, the President's sister, called attention to stalled flagship projects, such as the Parañaque Spillway and Laguna de Bay dredging, which were expected to alleviate flooding in Metro Manila but suffered from delays. Senator Bam Aquino raised concerns that the flood control budget exceeded allocations for school infrastructure, suggesting a misprioritization of public funds.

=== Bribery attempt ===
On August 22, 2025, Representative Leandro Leviste (Batangas–1st) reported to the Taal Municipal Police an alleged ₱3.1 million (US$62,944.16) bribery by DPWH Batangas 1st District Engineer Abelardo Calalo at his office in Taal, Batangas. The bribery was intended to stop an investigation by the House of Representatives into alleged corruption involving the DPWH's flood control projects in the district. Calalo was arrested in an entrapment operation later that day. On August 26, Leviste filed bribery and corruption cases against Calalo before the Office of the Batangas Provincial Prosecutor. He also urged Calalo to be a state witness in such investigation. On the same day, the DPWH suspended Calalo.

=== Flood mitigation conflict in Oriental Mindoro ===
In Oriental Mindoro, a dispute arose between Governor Humerlito Dolor and the provincial board over his dredging-based flood control program, which the latter questioned for its legality and transparency. The provincial board called for investigations, while Dolor defended the initiative as cost-free and compliant with environmental laws. He also criticized the provincial board for ignoring failed DPWH flood control projects in the province.

=== Flood control project collapse in Lucena ===
In August 2025, a ₱100 million (US$2.03 million) flood control project in Lucena, Quezon, under the office of Representative David Suarez (Quezon–2nd), collapsed, raising significant public concern. The project, built along the Dumacaa River near the city proper, drew criticism after a video circulated showing part of the structure falling apart; observers noted it appeared to have been constructed with a mix of sand and cement and featured minimal steel reinforcement. Critics have cited this as a clear indicator of poor construction practices and possible misuse of infrastructure funds. As of the latest reports, neither Suarez nor the Department of Public Works and Highways (DPWH) has issued an official explanation regarding the collapse or project details. Residents have called for investigations from the Commission on Audit (COA) and relevant agencies to ensure accountability. The incident renewed broader discussions about anomalies and corruption in flood control funding currently under Senate investigation.

=== "For Sale" scheme ===
On August 28, 2025, during an interview over DZBB-AM, Quirino Governor and former ULAP president Dakila Cua cited a mayor in one of the towns in his province who requested flood control projects worth hundreds of millions of pesos, despite other urgent infrastructure projects are needed. The mayor, who was not identified, asked barangay officials to sign the requests on the day of State of the Nation Address. According to reports, a contractor close to the mayor had already purchased the projects.

== Notable contractors and political affiliations ==
=== Discaya-linked firms ===
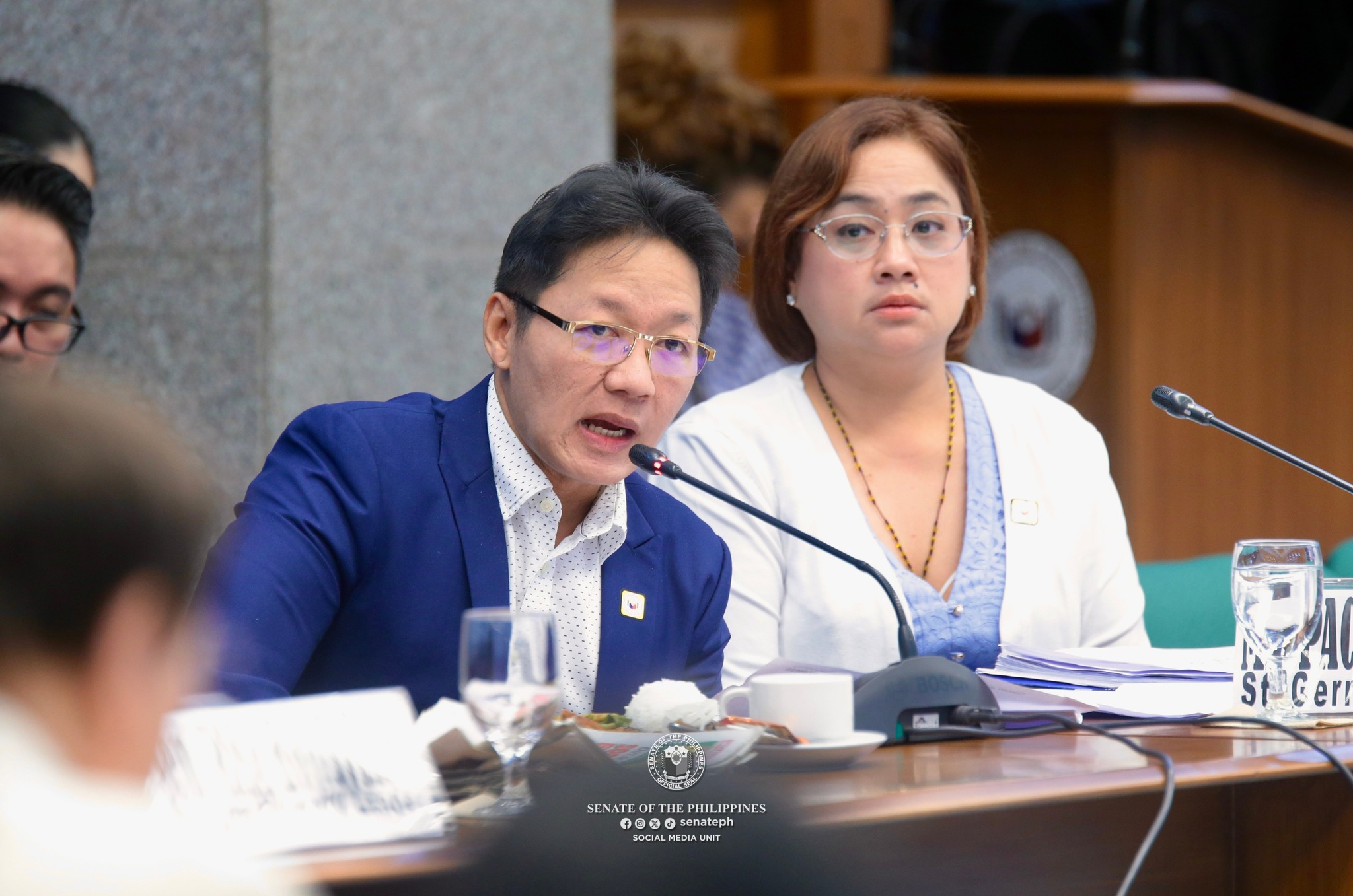
Curlee and Sarah Discaya during the Senate inquiry on September 8, 2025.

Construction companies owned by married couple Curlee and Sarah Discaya (also known as Cezarah Rowena Cruz), St. Timothy Construction Corporation and Alpha and Omega General Contractor and Development Corporation, were involved in government flood control contracts in Bulacan and Iloilo City. In August 2025, President Marcos criticized a flood mitigation structure in Bulacan, calling it a "ghost" project due to its visibly unfinished and structurally deficient state, despite its ₱96.49 million (US$1.96 million) budget. Local officials in Iloilo City similarly reported that Discaya-linked projects were delayed or failed to function as intended.

Separately, the couple drew public scrutiny after media features revealed their ownership of around 40 luxury vehicles, including a Cadillac Escalade, Bentley Bentayga, Porsche Cayenne, Rolls-Royce Cullinan, and Mercedes-Maybach GLS, with an estimated total value of ₱300 million (US$6.09 million) to ₱465 million (US$9.44 million). In response, the Bureau of Customs (BOC) launched an investigation into whether the vehicles were properly declared, taxed, and legally imported. BOC commissioner Ariel Nepomuceno noted that seizure or additional tax liabilities could result if the probe reveals deficiencies. Access to vehicles stored in residential property, however, remains contingent on obtaining a court-issued warrant or Letter of Authority. Civil society, including youth groups and political leaders, criticized the conspicuous display of wealth amid allegations that Discaya-linked companies benefited from flood control contracts, some of which are under Senate scrutiny. Pasig Mayor Vico Sotto, who had defeated Discaya in the 2025 Pasig mayoral election, described the spectacle as "bad regardless of the source" and called for accountability.

In September 2025, it was revealed that Senator Bong Go's family was a business partner of the Discayas for years, partnering with CLTG Builders, owned by his father, Desiderio, for over ₱816.98 million (US$16.59 million) in infrastructure projects in the Davao Region in 2017. The two construction companies had partnered to secure five infrastructure projects in Davao, owned by Sarah's husband, Curlee Discaya. Desiderio Go signed contracts with DPWH as the "Authorized Managing Officer" and represented the two companies. According to the DPWH database, it was shown that five joint projects for road construction have already been completed.

On September 1, 2025, Sarah Discaya attended a Senate Blue Ribbon Committee hearing and revealed that her nine construction firms have sometimes been involved in bidding for the same government flood control projects simultaneously. Initially, Discaya denied the allegation, but Senate President pro tempore and committee vice-chairperson Jinggoy Estrada pressed for data from the DPWH, in which Discaya admitted to. This was the first time Discaya attended the Senate probe after being subpoenaed for skipping the August 19 hearing. Two out of fifteen contractors, who received 20% of the country's flood control budget worth ₱100 billion (US$2.03 billion) over the past three years, denied involvement in ghost projects being investigated by the government. All 15 were present, except Alpha & Omega General Contractor & Development Corporation and MG Samidan Construction. Blue Ribbon Committee chairperson Rodante Marcoleta, Jinggoy Estrada, and vice-chairperson Erwin Tulfo questioned Discaya about her ownership of Alpha & Omega and eight other companies she claims are co-owned by her. Senate Minority Leader Tito Sotto inquired about the commencement of flood control projects by Discaya's companies from the DPWH. Discaya admitted that she began working with the DPWH in 2012, focusing on major projects from 2016 onwards, primarily in the provinces.

On September 20, 2025, a flood control project was halted after the revocation of the company's license. Phase 1 of the project in Lacaste Village, Barangay Pasonanca, Zamboanga City is completed, while Phase 2 is 72% complete and Phase 3 is 57% complete. Phase 2, valued at ₱95 million (US$1.93 million), was set for May 26 to June 26, 2026, and Phase 3, worth ₱1.43 billion (US$29.04 million), was scheduled from January 14 to December 2026.

=== Claudine Co ===
Claudine Co, an online influencer and singer, is the daughter of Hi-Tone Construction & Development Corporation owner Christopher Co, and the niece of Ako Bicol party-list representative and co-founder of Sunwest Inc. Zaldy Co, whose contractors are one of the top 15 in Malacañang's list. The Co family has business interests in construction and real estate, which have been identified as major recipients of government infrastructure and flood control contracts. From 2022 to 2025, Sunwest received the highest amount of public funds from 79 flood control projects amounting to ₱10.15 billion.

In August 2025, she attracted significant public scrutiny for social media posts featuring luxury items, private flights, etc., which commentators described as insensitive amid ongoing investigations into flood control contracts. Following mounting backlash, Claudine deactivated her social media accounts.

=== Gela Alonte ===
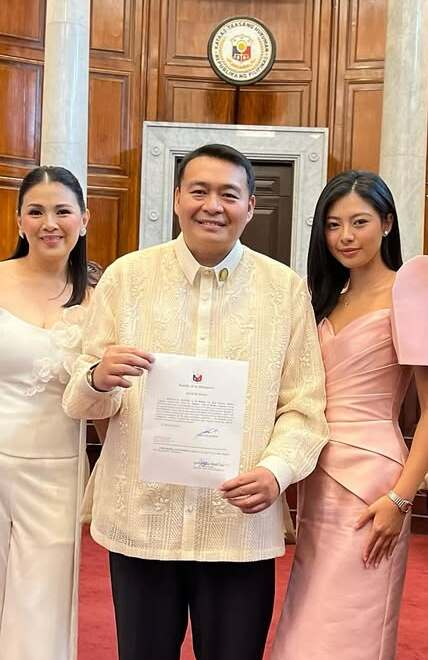
Biñan mayor Gel Alonte (center) with his wife Jhozalyn Mañego-Alonte (left) and daughter Gela Alonte (right)

Angela "Gela" Alonte, an actress and daughter of Biñan Mayor Angelo "Gel" Alonte, attracted social media criticism in August 2025 after a resurfaced video showed her commenting on political dynasties, specifically, "Paano ba 'yan? Nasa political dynasty 'yung pamilya ko. I mean, controversial," (transl. "What can I do? My family is in a political dynasty. I mean, controversial") delivered with laughter. The backlash intensified because the clip circulated shortly after typhoons Crising and Dante, when Biñan was experiencing flood-related hardships. Critics described her demeanor as insensitive to the local community's suffering, especially as the calamity coincided with her social media posts on her birthday celebration in July 2025. Although she was not directly implicated in flood control contract controversies, the timing and tone of the video, coupled with her family's political prominence, led to broader discussions about privilege, political dynasties, and the role of public figures during national infrastructure crises.

=== Jammy Cruz ===
Jammy Cruz, daughter of Noel Cruz, owner of Sto. Cristo Construction and Trading Inc., headquartered in Limay, Bataan, attracted public attention in 2025 after a video surfaced showing her displaying a luxury Chanel bag. Her family company secured at least ₱3.5 billion (US$71.07 million) worth of flood control projects from 2022 to 2024. The video sparked public criticism, with social media users linking the displayed luxury items to her family's involvement in flood control contracts. In response, Jammy deactivated her YouTube channel and set her Instagram account to private.

=== Duterte family involvement ===
The Duterte family, a political dynasty based in Davao City, has figured prominently in public discussion regarding the allocation and use of flood control funds in the Philippines. Members of the family have held high-ranking political offices, including former president Rodrigo Duterte, Vice President Sara Duterte, acting Davao City Mayor Sebastian Duterte, and Representative Paolo Duterte (Davao City–1st), while observers and critics have raised questions about the relationship between their political roles and government infrastructure spending. Rodrigo Duterte's daughter, Veronica "Kitty" Duterte, is not involved in politics but has attracted media attention as a social media personality. Reports have noted her purchases of luxury items and high-end goods, which have been highlighted in discussions of political families and public perceptions of wealth. While she has no direct role in flood control allocations, her lifestyle has occasionally been cited in commentary about the Duterte family's public image.

Between 2022 and 2024, Congress appropriated billions of pesos for nationwide flood control projects through the Department of Public Works and Highways (DPWH). Budget records show that the Davao Region, particularly Davao City's 1st district represented by Paolo Duterte, received some of the largest allocations, with reports indicating roughly ₱51 billion (US$1.04 billion) earmarked for projects over a three-year period. In 2025, in Davao City and Davao Del Sur alone, flood-control projects rose to ₱7.69 billion in May 2025.

The large appropriations drew attention amid broader controversy surrounding the national flood control program in 2024–2025, which was marked by allegations of "ghost" projects, overpricing, and irregularities involving contractors and implementing agencies. Mayor Sebastian Duterte publicly dismissed criticisms of flood control allocations as a "publicity stunt", a remark that was met with pushback from lawmakers and civil society groups who argued the matter warranted closer scrutiny.

Despite a COMELEC ban on giving or receiving donations from contractors, Glenn Escandor gave Sara Duterte a donation for her campaign. Escandor's Esdevco Realty Corporation paid for advertisements worth ₱19.9 million (US$404,060.91) for Sara Duterte's 2022 campaign for vice president. Genesis88 Construction Inc., also owned by Escandor, was a major contractor whose government contracts increased significantly during Rodrigo Duterte's presidency. In the 2022 budget enacted under Duterte, Genesis88's contracts with the DPWH reached ₱1.9 billion.

In November 2025, Deputy Minority Leader Antonio Tinio filed a resolution to direct the House of Representatives to investigate flood control projects from 2019 to 2022 along the Davao and Matina Rivers. According to the resolution, projects worth ₱4.4 billion have indications of fraud, overpricing, ghost and incomplete delivery, collusion, and a pattern of plunder.

=== Marcos family ===
Despite laws prohibiting contractors from giving campaign donations, Rodulfo Hilot Jr. of Rudhil Construction & Enterprises gave a ₱20-million campaign donation to Bongbong Marcos, while Jonathan Quirante of Quirante Construction donated ₱1 million. Both companies were awarded substantial government contracts since Marcos's election as president in 2022. In 2024, Rudhil was awarded a contract for a ₱243-million sewage treatment plant project for the Philippine Ports Authority, in addition to its contracts with the DPWH. Quirante's firm was awarded a ₱3-billion contract in 2023, with its contracts totaling ₱3.8 billion by 2025.

House Speaker Martin Romualdez and his ally and former appropriations chair Zaldy Co drew criticism over alleged involvement in the 2025 General Appropriations Act (GAA), which opponents denounced as one of the most flawed and corrupt spending measures ever approved. From 2023 to 2025, Romualdez, a cousin of President Bongbong Marcos, received ₱14.4 billion of "allocable" funds from the 2025 GAA, the second highest amount approved by Congress for its members in the House of Representatives. The President's son Representative Sandro Marcos got the highest fund allocation at ₱15.8 billion. A Philippine Center for Investigative Journalism report that investigated the national budget described Martin Romualdez and Sandro Marcos as the "pork barrel kings".

"Allocable" funds in the national budget approved by Congress have been criticized by the People's Budget Coalition as a new form of pork barrel, since these go to "politically determined projects that crowd out more equitable and accountable public spending". Unprogrammed appropriations (UA) and confidential and intelligence fund (CIF) under the Office of the President were also tagged as forms of corruption-prone pork barrel funds. In the National Expenditure Program proposed by the Office of the President for 2026, the President will get the bulk of the total CIF at ₱4.5 billion. Makabayan lawmakers estimate that "allocables" comprise ₱230 million for each congress representative and ₱3.2 billion for each senator in the upcoming 2026 budget. Despite accusations that he got billions of pesos in kickbacks in the flood control scandal, former House Speaker Martin Romualdez was given ₱6 billion out of ₱500 billion in "allocable" and "non-allocable" DPWH funds in the upcoming national budget program for 2026.

At a House of Representatives corruption probe on September 8, 2025, contractor Curlee Discaya implicated Romualdez in alleged kickbacks from public works contracts. Romualdez formally resigned as speaker on September 17, 2025. During a Senate Blue Ribbon Committee hearing on September 25, 2025, Orly Guteza testified that he regularly delivered luggage filled with cash to Romualdez's residence while working as a security aide to Zaldy Co. The amount allegedly delivered to Romualdez was an estimated ₱1.68 billion. In November 2025, Zaldy Co alleged that Romualdez and President Marcos got billions of pesos in kickbacks from flood-control projects. Co accused former Marcos aide Jojo Cadiz of being Marcos's bagman. Cadiz is also linked to JSJ Builders Inc, which was awarded ₱251 million worth of flood control and road projects in the Marcoses' home province of Ilocos Norte.

On September 30, the Department of Justice (DOJ) said that it was investigating Romualdez in connection with the flood control corruption scandal. The DOJ issued an immigration lookout order on October 8 against Romualdez and senators Francis Escudero, Joel Villanueva, Jinggoy Estrada, upon the request of the Independent Commission for Infrastructure.

On December 18, Department of Public Works and Highways recommended the filing of charges for plunder, malversation, graft and bribery against Romualdez and 86 other people. The Independent Commission for Infrastructure also recommended the filing of plunder, graft, and bribery charges against Romualdez and Zaldy Co before the Office of the Ombudsman. House Deputy Minority Leader Antonio Tinio (ACT party-list), House Assistant Minority Leader Renee Co (Kabataan party-list), and Gabriela party-list Representative Sarah Elago filed House Resolution 515 calling for a legislative probe on Bongbong Marcos, Sandro Marcos, former Executive Secretary Lucas Bersamin, and other officials with alleged links to the flood control corruption controversy, and as such Bersamin was fired by Marcos. The Ombudsman said that it will investigate Sandro Marcos and Romualdez in relation to pork barrel funds that they got from the national budget.

In Ilocos Norte, the Guillen family, a local ally of the Marcoses, are contractors who have been awarded government projects in towns where they are also elected officials. The Guillen-Salazar family owns companies that have been top DPWH contractors since 2016. These companies are Dylan Equipment Construction and Supplies with ₱415.8 million worth of DPWH projects, North Tech Builders and Construction Supply with ₱372.3 million in DPWH projects, and Skyline Construction Equipment and Development Corporation, with ₱368.4 million in DPWH projects. Bongbong Marcos appointed contractor Eddie Guillen to head the National Irrigation Administration in 2022 to replace Benny Antiporda.

During the Marcos administration, from 2022 to 2025, the value of flood-control projects in some provinces and cities increased by 6 to 8 times, such as in Bulacan and Cebu. In Marcos's home province of Ilocos Norte, flood control projects jumped from ₱463.67 million in 2022 to ₱8.72 billion in 2025. In Romualdez's home province of Leyte, flood-control projects rose from ₱2.17 billion to ₱10.06 billion. In Romualdez's congressional district, billions of pesos in DPWH contracts were awarded to Zaldy Co's Sunwest Inc. Some flood-prone areas in other parts of the Philippines got less funds and projects. In January 2026, the Makabayan lawmakers filed an impeachment complaint in the House of Representatives for the betrayal of public trust relating to corruption allegations on the government's flood control projects. In July 2026, the Office of the Ombudsman said that it was filing plunder charges against Romualdez, whom the office identified as a "central figure" in the flood control corruption scandal. In October 2026, Romualdez and Co were charged by the Ombudsman for repeatedly getting kickbacks and other benefits worth over ₱7.44 billion.

=== Villar family ===
Senator Cynthia Villar was the proponent of the Las Piñas-Zapote River Drive project meant to control flooding and clean the Zapote River in Las Piñas City. The infrastructure project cost ₱2.42-billion, funded through the General Appropriations Act from 2011 to 2022. It was constructed in several phases beginning 2012. A maintenance road that is part of the project was opened to private vehicles by the Las Piñas City government to ease traffic. Despite completion of the project in 2022, residents still experience flooding during heavy rains and the river continues to be polluted. The project passes through businesses and real estate owned by the Villar family and has raised allegations of conflicts of interest.

In 2025, then-Justice Secretary Jesus Crispin Remulla said that the Department of Justice was investigating possible family ties between Senator Mark Villar and a government contractor. Bilyonaryo News Channel previously reported that I&E Construction, linked to Villar's cousin Carlo Aguilar, received government contracts worth ₱18.5 billion. Villar denied impropriety in the infrastructure contracts awarded to I&E during his tenure as DPWH secretary.

An investigative report by Rappler said that Motiontrade Development Corporation, owned by Villar's uncle Christian Aguilar, secured ₱390 million in flood control projects in 2023 and 2024 and ₱2.8 billion in public infrastructure projects from 2023 to 2025. In November 2025, the Office of the Ombudsman said that it was investigating alleged corruption in flood control projects that may have benefited the Villar family's property businesses.

In November 2025, former DPWH undersecretary Roberto Bernardo alleged that Mark Villar, Manuel Bonoan, and Cathy Cabral ran a kickback scheme at the DPWH. Cabral, under Villar and Bonoan, made additions or insertions to the proposed national budget to ensure which projects get funded. Bernardo alleged that he delivered Mark Villar's 10% kickback to Carlo Aguilar, Motionatrade co-owner and Villar's cousin.

== Constitutional Commission investigation ==
=== Commission on Audit ===
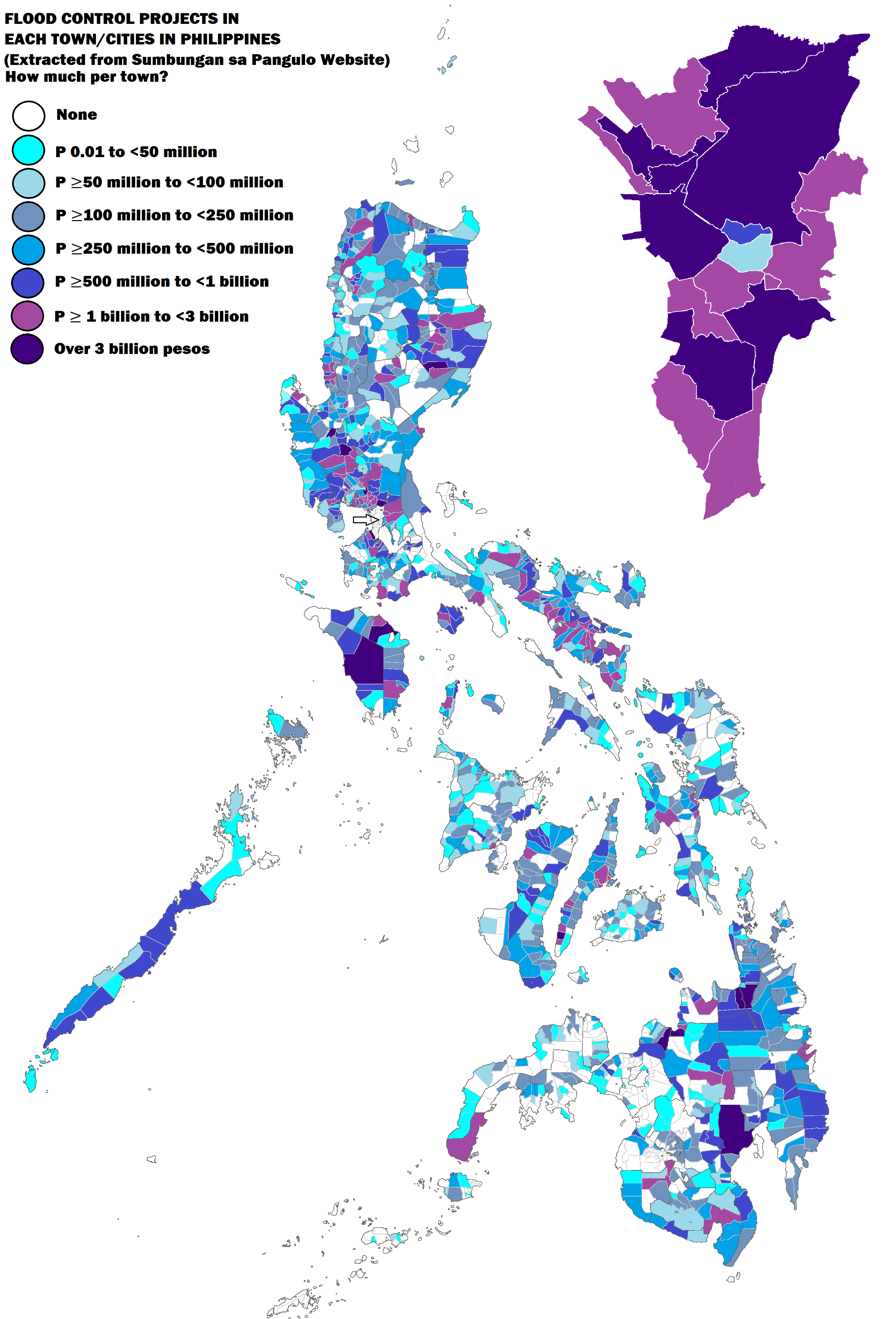
Estimated prices of the flood control projects per town and city. Major cities in the Philippines receive much more budget in flood control projects.

In July 2025, Commission on Audit (COA) chairperson Gamaliel Cordoba ordered a fraud audit of flood control projects in Bulacan, following citizen complaints filed through the Sumbong sa Pangulo (transl. Report to the President) platform. Bulacan alone accounted for nearly 45% of Central Luzon's ₱548 billion (US$11.13 billion) flood control budget since 2022, making it a focal point of investigation.

In September 2025, the COA initiated a performance audit on government flood control projects in the Philippines, following a directive from President Marcos. The decision follows widespread flooding and devastation in Metro Manila, raising concerns about the effectiveness of current flood mitigation programs. In a memorandum on August 23, 2025, Cordoba instructed the COA Performance Audit Office (PAO) to commence the audit immediately. The directive aligns with COA Resolution No. 2024-018, which approved the Performance Audit Portfolio (PAP) for 2024–2026, which includes programs like the government's Flood Risk Management and Resiliency Program for performance audits.

On September 18, 2025, COA identified four flood control projects in Bulacan, collectively valued at ₱389.6 million (US$7.91 million), and submitted fraud audit reports concerning them to the Office of the Ombudsman.

On September 26, 2025, COA reported that officials and contractors from the DPWH in Bulacan could face graft and malversation charges over ₱360 million (US$7.31 million) in flood control projects. According to fraud audit reports submitted by COA to the ICI, several flood control projects in Bulacan have been identified. It includes the construction of a flood control structure along the Angat River at Barangay Santo Cristo/Barangay Taal for ₱92.9 million (US$1.89 million) by Syms Construction Trading; a Riverbank Protection Structure (Package A) at Barangay Bulihan for ₱69 million (US$1.4 million) by Topnotch Catalyst Builders, Inc.; and two similar projects involving slope protection and waterways along Bocaue River in Barangay Bambang and Barangay Turo, each costing ₱99 million (US$2.01 million) and executed by a joint venture between Topnotch Catalyst Builders, Inc. and Beam Team Developer Specialist, Inc. COA indicated that individuals involved may be charged with graft and corruption, malversation, and falsification of documents under the Revised Penal Code, along with violations of COA Circular No. 2009-001 and the Government Procurement Reform Act.

=== Commission on Elections ===
Lack of regulation in campaign donations and a weak public procurement system have left public funds vulnerable to corruption. In 2022, at least 30 contractors who gave campaign donations to senators and representatives had or were given government projects. In the 2022 Philippine presidential election, candidates Bongbong Marcos and Sara Duterte got tens of millions of pesos from contractors despite the Omnibus Election Code banning donations from companies that do business with the government. From 2022 to 2025, the public works contracts of those campaign donors rose significantly.

On August 28, 2025, the Commission on Elections (COMELEC) identified at least 15 government contractors who contributed to candidates in the 2022 national and local elections, raising concerns about potential campaign finance laws that could lead to jail terms for those involved. According to COMELEC chairperson George Garcia, the contractors were identified by the poll body's political finance and affairs department, and the list may expand as the review continues. The contractors are considered as such if they had a government contract at the time the candidate filed their candidacy or after the elections.

On September 8, 2025, Francis Escudero was ousted as Senate president following reports that his top donor in the 2022 Senate election was the president of Centerways Construction, which has been linked to allegedly anomalous flood control projects.

== Executive action ==
=== Presidential actions ===
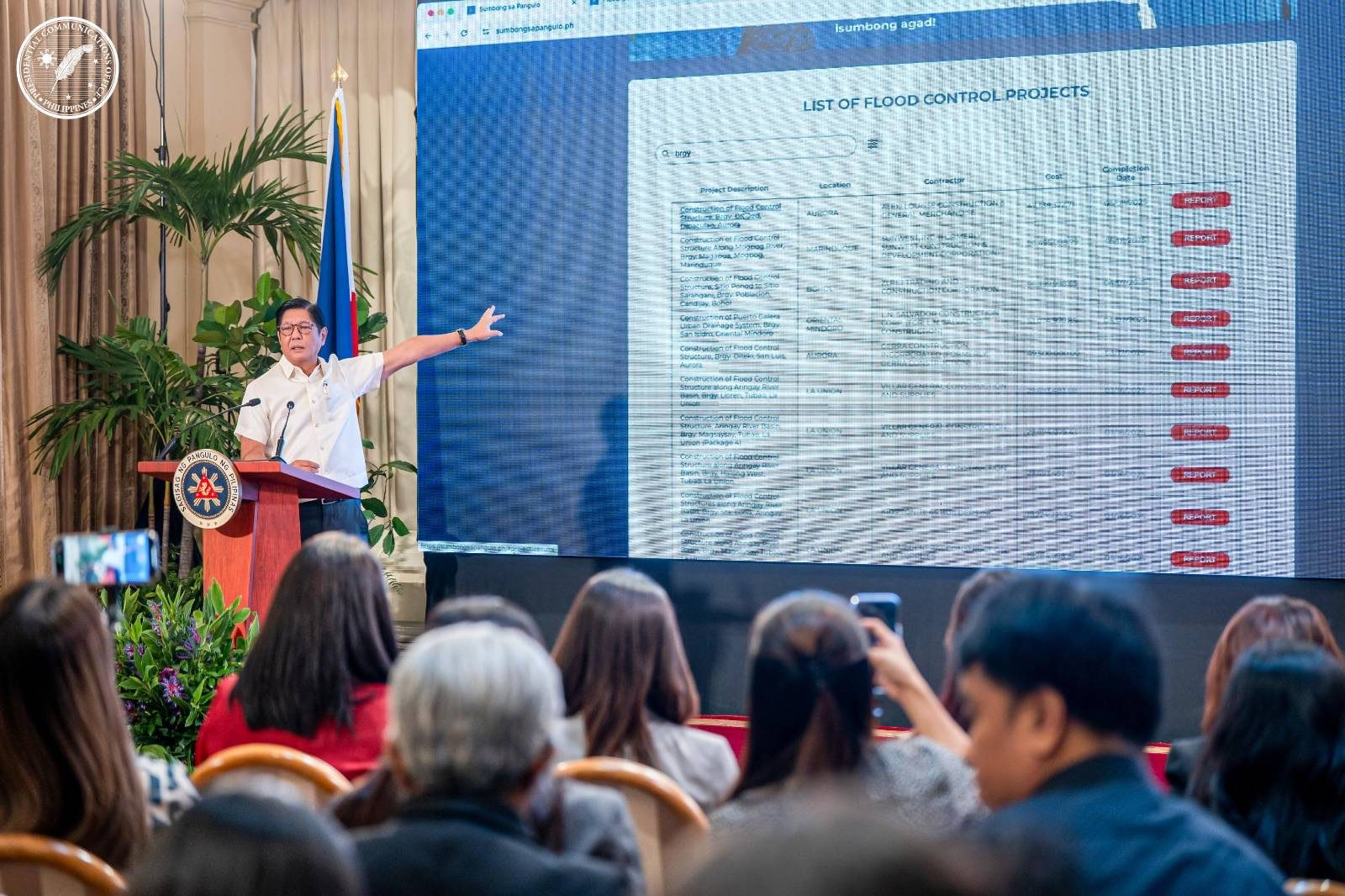
President Bongbong Marcos exposing on August 11, 2025, that 15 contractors accounted for ₱100 billion (US$2.03 billion), equivalent to 20% of all flood control projects over the past three years.

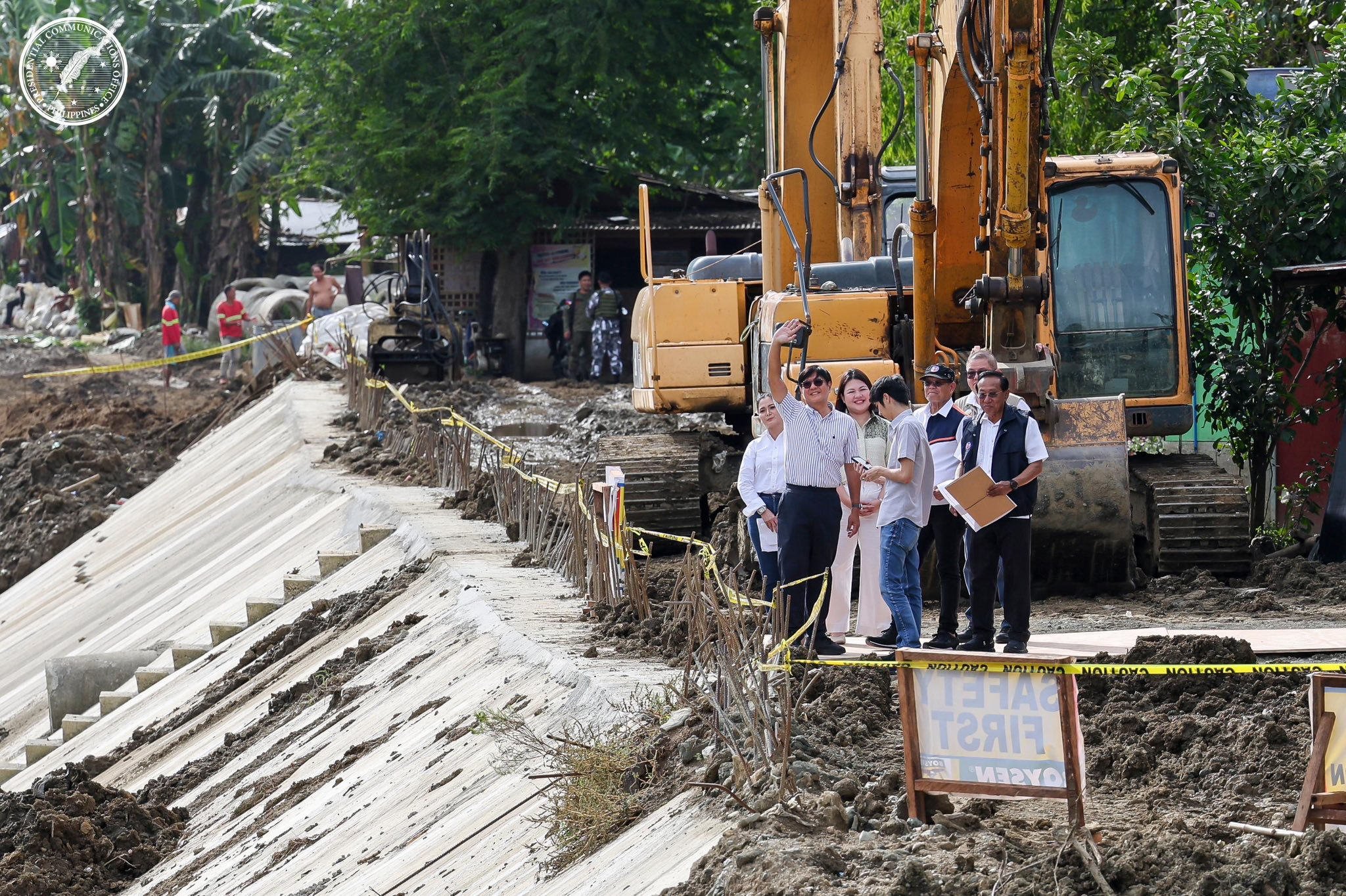
President Bongbong Marcos leading an inspection of an unfinished flood control project site in Iloilo City on August 13, 2025.

During his fourth SONA on July 28, 2025, President Bongbong Marcos vowed to expose and prosecute corruption in flood control projects. He ordered the release of a complete list of flood control projects from the past three years for public scrutiny.

On August 11, 2025, Marcos revealed initial findings from an audit following the fourth SONA which found that ₱100 billion (US$2.03 billion), or around 20% of the Marcos administration's flood control project expenditures, went to only 15 contractors. The audit also flagged projects collectively worth more than ₱350 billion (US$7.11 billion) which did not specify the exact flood control structure built or repaired, as well as several projects at different locations which disclosed identical designs and materials.

Marcos launched the "Sumbong sa Pangulo" (transl. "Report to the President") website on August 11, 2025, following his commitment during the fourth SONA to investigate flood control project anomalies. The website allows citizens to monitor flood control projects, providing data on project location, implementing contractor, total cost, and completion date. Website users can then report irregularities or other concerns for any listed project. Close to 2,000 complaints were submitted through the website during its first week of operations. More than 12,000 complaints were subsequently logged less than a month after launch.

On August 27, 2025, Marcos ordered several agencies, including the Bureau of Internal Revenue (BIR) and the Office of the Ombudsman, to conduct "lifestyle checks" on all government officials, starting with those in the DPWH. On August 28, Senator Risa Hontiveros urged Marcos to include himself in the lifestyle checks, arguing that the process should begin with "the highest official in the country." She suggested that disclosing the President's Statement of Assets, Liabilities, and Net Worth (SALN) would demonstrate leadership by example and reinforce the credibility of the initiative. Hontiveros also volunteered to undergo a lifestyle check herself, citing her "middle-class lifestyle" as open to public scrutiny. The following day, on August 29, Malacañang confirmed that Marcos was willing to submit to a lifestyle check and to release his SALN.

The executive branch considered issuing an executive order creating an independent commission to investigate flood control project anomalies, with a draft submitted for Marcos' signature on September 8, 2025. The commission will work in parallel with existing probes launched by Congress and is poised to include members from diverse backgrounds such as forensic accountancy and the judiciary.

On September 8, 2025, Marcos announced that the government will not include new funding for flood control projects in the 2026 national budget. This decision follows congressional investigations that have implicated numerous lawmakers, including his cousin, Speaker Martin Romualdez, Senators Jinggoy Estrada and Joel Villanueva, in alleged kickbacks from public works contracts. The following day, he also announced the redirection of ₱225 billion (US$4.57 billion), initially designated for locally funded flood control projects in the 2026 budget, to education, health, and other urgent priorities. He stated that the ₱350 billion (US$7.11 billion) flood control budget for 2025 was delayed due to ongoing investigations, rendering the 2026 allocation redundant. Approximately ₱50 billion (US$1.02 billion) in foreign-assisted flood projects will proceed. The realignment of funds is intended to optimize savings and meet pressing social requirements.

On September 26, 2025, Marcos announced the reallocation of nearly ₱36 billion (US$730.96 million) from flood control projects in the proposed 2026 national budget to support social programs under the Department of Social Welfare and Development (DSWD). He emphasized the strengthening of the Pantawid Pamilyang Pilipino Program (lit. 'Bridging Program for the Filipino Family') (4Ps) to assist more families in improving their livelihoods.

During an aid distribution event at Gonzaga, Cagayan on September 27, 2025, Marcos announced that only flood control projects meeting all requirements will be approved, underscoring his dedication to reducing irregularities in infrastructure project implementation. He stated that these projects will only move forward with properly prepared proposals and local government clearance. He assured the public of the ongoing funding of compliant flood control initiatives, with over ₱300 billion (US$6.09 billion) allocated until next year.

=== Establishment of the Independent Commission for Infrastructure ===
Official logo of the Independent Commission for Infrastructure.

On September 11, 2025, Marcos established the Independent Commission for Infrastructure (ICI) through Executive Order No. 94. This three-member body will investigate irregularities in flood control projects and all national government infrastructure works throughout the years. Malacañang stated that members of the ad hoc fact-finding commission are to be persons of "proven competence, integrity, probity and independence." Marcos named former Supreme Court Associate Justice Andres Reyes Jr. as its chairperson, former DPWH Secretary Rogelio Singson and SyCip Gorres Velayo & Co. (SGV) Country Managing Partner & Fraud Examiner Rossana Fajardo as commission members, with Baguio Mayor Benjamin Magalong as a special adviser. The commission will also be supported by a secretariat providing technical and administrative assistance.

During its investigation, the Independent Commission for Infrastructure (ICI) conducted 32 hearings involving 36 witnesses and resource persons, including incumbent and former government officials, legislators, contractors, and heads of government agencies. Among those who appeared before the commission were Senators Francis Escudero, Joel Villanueva, and Jinggoy Estrada; former House Speaker Martin Romualdez; House Majority Leader and Ilocos Norte Representative Sandro Marcos; former Senator Grace Poe; and Budget Secretary Amenah Pangandaman.

Most of the commission's proceedings were conducted in executive session. The first hearing to be televised and livestreamed was held on December 2, 2025, and featured Laguna Representative Benjamin Agarao Jr. and officials of the Land Bank of the Philippines as resource persons. Agarao denied allegations linking him to contractors Curlee and Sarah Discaya and rejected accusations that he had received commissions from flood control projects.

Land Bank officials who appeared before the commission included president and chief executive officer Ma. Lynette V. Ortiz, senior vice president Marilou L. Villafranca, and first vice president Cesar S. Cabañes. Commissioners questioned the officials regarding banking transactions and fund releases connected to contractors involved in flood control projects under investigation.

Sandro Marcos voluntarily appeared before the commission on December 4, 2025, and requested that portions of his testimony be heard in executive session.

On February 6, 2026, the ICI submitted its 125-day accomplishment report to President Bongbong Marcos, summarizing its investigation from September 15, 2025, to January 18, 2026. The report stated that the commission had referred 65 individuals to the Office of the Ombudsman, coordinated the issuance of immigration lookout bulletin orders against 66 individuals through the Department of Justice, and gathered documentary and testimonial evidence relating to alleged anomalies in flood control projects nationwide.

On March 24, 2026, the commission transmitted its collected evidence, recorded testimonies, transcripts, and investigative documents to the Department of Justice and the Office of the Ombudsman for use in ongoing criminal and administrative investigations arising from the flood control scandal. The commission ceased operations on March 31, 2026, after concluding that it had substantially fulfilled its mandate. Its remaining records and findings were formally endorsed to the Office of the Ombudsman and other government agencies for further action, marking the end of the ICI's independent investigation into alleged corruption in flood control projects.

==== Organizational issues at the ICI ====
The Independent Commission for Infrastructure (ICI) experienced several organizational challenges during the course of its investigation. On September 26, 2025, former Baguio Mayor and retired police general Benjamin Magalong resigned as the commission's special adviser and investigator amid concerns about a potential conflict of interest arising from his prior professional associations. Magalong subsequently stated that he did not believe an actual conflict existed but chose to resign to avoid raising questions about the integrity of the commission's work. He was replaced by former Philippine National Police chief Rodolfo Azurin Jr. on September 30, 2025.

The commission later faced difficulties in maintaining its membership. On December 3, 2025, commissioner and former Public Works Secretary Rogelio Singson resigned, citing health and security concerns. Later that month, commissioner Rossana Fajardo submitted her resignation effective December 31, 2025, stating that the commission had substantially completed its fact-finding responsibilities and that subsequent investigative and prosecutorial actions should be undertaken by the Department of Justice and the Office of the Ombudsman.

The departures of Singson and Fajardo left retired Supreme Court Associate Justice Andres Reyes Jr. as the commission's sole remaining commissioner. The lack of a quorum prevented the ICI from exercising certain functions as a collegial body and raised questions regarding its ability to continue operations pending the appointment of replacement commissioners. Despite these organizational challenges, the commission continued its investigation and completed its final report, which was subsequently transmitted to the Office of the President, the Department of Justice, and the Office of the Ombudsman before the commission ceased operations on March 31, 2026.

=== Bureau of Immigration ===
==== Immigration monitoring, lookout bulletins, and travel restrictions ====
On September 4, 2025, the Bureau of Immigration (BI) disclosed that a contractor linked to allegedly anomalous flood control projects had already departed the Philippines. BI spokesperson Dana Sandoval said the individual was among the contractors publicly identified by President Bongbong Marcos in connection with the government's investigation into flood control anomalies. The bureau did not disclose the contractor's identity, company affiliation, date of departure, or destination, but stated that it had begun monitoring the individual's travel movements and would coordinate its findings with the Department of Justice (DOJ).

In response to concerns that individuals implicated in the alleged irregularities might leave the country, the DOJ and the Independent Commission for Infrastructure (ICI) sought the issuance of immigration lookout bulletin orders (ILBOs). On October 8, 2025, the DOJ approved the ICI's request to place 33 incumbent and former government officials, legislators, contractors, and private individuals under immigration monitoring. The Bureau of Immigration subsequently entered their names into its watchlist system and directed immigration officers to report any attempt to leave or enter the Philippines.

Among the most prominent personalities covered by the ILBOs were former House Speaker Martin Romualdez; Senators Francis Escudero, Jinggoy Estrada, and Joel Villanueva; former Senators Bong Revilla, Nancy Binay, and Grace Poe; Budget Secretary Amenah Pangandaman; Representatives Roman Romulo, Arjo Atayde, Marcy Teodoro, Jojo Ang, Benjamin Agarao Jr., Dean Asistio, and Marivic Co-Pilar; former Representatives Teodorico Haresco Jr., Bem Noel, Marvin Rillo and Florida Robes, and contractors Curlee Discaya and Sarah Discaya. Other individuals covered by the order included Commission on Audit Commissioner Mario Lipana, Marilou Laurio-Lipana, Department of Education Undersecretary Trygve Olaivar, businessman Maynard Ngu, several district engineers of the DPWH, and local government officials identified during the investigation.

Separate ILBOs were likewise issued against Curlee and Sarah Discaya on October 8, 2025. The DOJ directed the Bureau of Immigration to closely monitor their international travel movements and to immediately report any departure from or arrival into the Philippines while investigations into their companies' involvement in flood control projects remained ongoing.

As the Ombudsman's investigation progressed, several respondents became subject to precautionary hold departure orders (PHDOs) issued by the Sandiganbayan upon application by the Office of the Ombudsman. On April 16, 2026, the Sandiganbayan issued a PHDO against Senator Jinggoy Estrada, preventing him from leaving the country while the Ombudsman's preliminary investigation into allegations of plunder and graft remained pending.

On April 22, 2026, the Sandiganbayan Seventh Division issued a PHDO against former House Speaker Martin Romualdez following the Ombudsman's request in connection with allegations of plunder, bribery, graft, and money laundering arising from the flood control investigation.

On April 27, 2026, the Sandiganbayan Sixth Division issued PHDOs against Senator Francis Escudero and businessman Maynard Ngu, barring them from leaving the Philippines while the Ombudsman's preliminary investigation remained pending.

Following the filing of formal criminal charges, the Sandiganbayan issued a warrant for Estrada's arrest on June 1, 2026, on charges of plunder arising from the alleged receipt of kickbacks from flood control projects. The anti-graft court simultaneously issued a hold departure order preventing him from leaving the Philippines while the case remained pending. Estrada surrendered to authorities later that day.

=== Department of Budget and Management ===
In August 2025, the Department of Budget and Management (DBM) announced a ₱71.7 billion (US$1.46 billion) reduction in flood control infrastructure allocations for next year's National Expenditure Program (NEP). DBM Secretary Amenah Pangandaman announced a ₱274.9 billion (US$5.58 billion) allocation for flood-related projects in the NEP for 2026, lower than this year's ₱346.6 billion (US$7.04 billion). However, the NEP lacks appropriation for the controversial Ayuda para sa Kapos ang Kita Program (transl. Aid for Low Income Program) (AKAP), a form of pork barrel. The NEP also reduced confidential funds by 11%.

=== Department of Finance ===
In September 2025, Finance Secretary Ralph Recto said that anomalous ghost flood control projects are estimated to have cost the Philippine economy as much as ₱118 billion (US$2.4 billion) between 2023 and 2025. During the Senate panel on finance's meeting on the second day, with the Development Budget Coordination Committee (DBCC) concerning the NEP for the upcoming year, he expressed his agency's condemnation of reported anomalous flood control projects, emphasizing the seriousness of revenue generation.

At the same time, the Department of Finance (DOF) will implement a more stringent approval process for flood control projects. These projects will now be consolidated within a single river basin, ensuring their aggregate value is sufficient to warrant high-level scrutiny. According to Recto, the Economy and Development (ED) Council Investment Coordination Committee – Cabinet Committee (ICC-CC), sanctioned a more rigorous measure intended to mitigate corruption within specific projects. The resolution mandates a thorough government review of flood management projects to ensure they are prepared for immediate implementation. The current ICC guidelines mandate evaluation only for projects exceeding a ₱2.5 billion (US$50.76 million) threshold. Consequently, the majority of existing flood control projects, which were assessed on an individual basis, had costs below this threshold and therefore did not undergo the ICC evaluation process.

=== Department of Justice ===
On September 3 and 4, 2025, Justice Secretary Jesus Crispin Remulla signed two immigration lookout bulletin orders (ILBO) against 43 people implicated in the anomalous flood control projects, based on the list of names submitted by Senate Blue Ribbon Committee chairperson Rodante Marcoleta and DPWH Secretary Vince Dizon, respectively.

On September 26, 2025, the Department of Justice (DOJ) announced that 21 individuals, including incumbent legislators, had been recommended for case build-up and possible prosecution over alleged anomalies in flood control projects. The recommendation was based on affidavits submitted by former Department of Public Works and Highways officials and endorsed by the National Bureau of Investigation (NBI).

Those identified by the DOJ included Representative Co; Senators Escudero, Villanueva, and Jinggoy; former Senator Revilla; Undersecretaries and former Representative Cajayon-Uy, Undersecretary Roberto Bernardo; former DPWH district engineer Henry Alcantara; Special Envoy Maynard Ngu; Carleen Villa; John Carlo Rivera; Linda "Victoria" Macanas; Juanito Mendoza, CPA; Sally Nicolas Santos; Jesse Mahusay; Engineers Brice Ericson Hernandez, Jaypee Mendoza and Arjay Domasig; and individuals identified only by the aliases "Beng Ramos", "Mina" and "Andrei Balatbat".

On December 5, 2025, Justice Undersecretary Jojo Cadiz, a former aide of President Bongbong Marcos, resigned from his post amid allegations that a 2-year-old company owned by his son was awarded ₱250 million worth of flood-control and other infrastructure projects in Ilocos Norte.

=== Department of Public Works and Highways ===
==== DPWH under Manuel Bonoan ====
On August 29, 2025, DPWH Secretary Manuel Bonoan issued a memorandum prohibiting DPWH officials and employees from traveling abroad for personal reasons until November 2025, or "unless circumstances warrant the earlier lifting of the suspension or further extension."

==== Change of DPWH leadership ====
On August 31, 2025, Bonoan resigned from his post, effective September 1. He was replaced by Vince Dizon initially on ad interim basis. Many lawmakers expressed their support for Bonoan's resignation, citing it as an opportunity to delve deeper into the DPWH; for example, Representative Leila de Lima (Mamamayang Liberal) stated that the resignation of the DPWH Secretary is necessary for an impartial investigation and reform, but does not exempt him from accountability for the anomalous flood control projects.

==== DPWH under Vince Dizon ====
Shortly after being sworn in as the new DPWH Secretary on September 1, Dizon announced that he would order the courtesy resignation of all DPWH undersecretaries, assistant secretaries, division heads, and district engineers as an attempt to curb corruption. He also stated that contractors responsible for "ghost" or substandard infrastructure projects would be permanently blacklisted.

On September 2, he announced the abolishment of the DPWH Anti-Graft and Corrupt Practices Committee, which was formed by Bonoan, saying that the department should not investigate itself.

On September 3, Dizon asked the Department of Justice to issue an immigration lookout bulletin against over 20 DPWH officials and contractors involved in the ongoing investigation.

On September 4, Dizon fired DPWH Region IV-A Assistant Regional Director (OIC) Henry Alcantara and Bulacan 1st District engineers Brice Ericson Hernandez and Jaypee Mendoza over anomalous flood control projects in the province, and he recommended filing cases against them.

On September 5, Dizon urged Wawao Builders General Manager Mark Allan Arevalo to surrender following accusations that his company was involved in fraudulent "ghost" flood control projects across the country. He commented on whether Arevalo could be a "dummy" after Arevalo testified before the Senate Blue Ribbon committee's probe into flood control project anomalies on September 1.

On September 9, Dizon mandated the immediate halt of all flood control projects in Oriental Mindoro due to significant irregularities found in a ₱3 billion (US$60.91 million) flood control project in Barangay Tagumpay, Naujan. He identified several interconnected issues in the 1.5-kilometer (0.93 mi) flood control project, notably a significant discrepancy between the masterplan's requirement of 12 meters (39 ft) sheet piles and the installed less-than-3 meters (9.8 ft) sheet piles.

On September 11, Dizon stated that the complaint, which falls under Anti-Graft and Corrupt Practices Act, also known as Republic Act (RA) No. 3019, will be filed against 18 individuals and companies allegedly involved in flood control anomalies, highlighting that these cases are non-bailable. Among them are Alcantara, Hernandez, Curlee and Sarah Discaya. He also suspended the wearing of service uniforms by DPWH personnel to prevent them from being harassed amid the controversy.

On September 16, Dizon found several flood control projects in Bauang, La Union to be "super substandard" during an inspection. He observed the use of inferior materials and noted that one project, purportedly completed in March, was still under construction. The inspection covered nine projects, including flood mitigation structures along the Bauang River Basin.

On September 17, the DPWH reduced its proposed 2026 NEP budget by ₱252 billion (US$5.12 billion), removing funding for locally funded flood control projects. The agency's revised budget is ₱625.8 billion (US$12.71 billion), down from ₱881 billion (US$17.89 billion), though ₱15.77 billion (US$320.2 million) for foreign-assisted flood control projects was retained. Dizon stated the department addressed concerns such as funding completed and duplicate projects. Additionally, ₱3 billion (US$60.91 million) allocated for duplicate or completed projects, including overlapping road sections and installations, was also trimmed.

=== Department of Migrant Workers ===
On September 12, 2025, the Department of Migrant Workers (DMW) Secretary Hans Cacdac, announced that the DMW is recalling Labor Attaché Macy Monique Maglanque, who was stationed in Los Angeles, to undergo an investigation, after she was mentioned in an ongoing Senate investigation. He also stated that no penalties have been imposed yet, but Maglanque is expected to respond to inquiries from the DMW and other necessary investigative bodies.

=== Anti-Money Laundering Council and the Bangko Sentral ng Pilipinas ===
On September 16, 2025, the Anti-Money Laundering Council (AMLC) secured court approval to freeze the bank accounts of individuals accused of corruption in government flood control projects, intending to halt the movement of stolen public funds and enable recovery. Concurrently, the Bangko Sentral ng Pilipinas (BSP) (lit. 'Central Bank of the Philippines') is leveraging a new law to probe financial accounts suspected of being used to misappropriate taxpayer funds allocated for flood mitigation. According to AMLC Executive Director Matthew David, he stated that the freeze order specifically targets 135 bank accounts and 27 insurance policies.

In October 2025, the AMLC is reportedly monitoring at least ₱5 billion (US$101.52 million) worth of assets linked to an alleged flood control corruption scheme, according to the ICI. The amount is expected to increase as the probe continues. The ₱5 billion (US$101.52 million) figure, spread across over 2,800 bank and financial accounts, is a "moving target" as investigators continue to trace and freeze additional assets. As of now, ₱4.67 billion (US$94.82 million) billion in assets have been frozen.

=== Local government ===
On August 22, 2025, the League of Cities of the Philippines (LCP), led by San Juan Mayor Francis Zamora, expressed support for President Marcos' push for transparency and accountability in flood control projects, some of which were exposed as either "ghost" or poorly constructed by monopolizing contractors.

On August 28, 2025, Quezon City Mayor Joy Belmonte announced that over 70 mayors have signed the "Mayors for Good Governance" amid the flood control controversy.

On August 29, 2025, a lawyer from one of the contracting firms implicated in Marcos' anomalous flood control projects approached the Department of Justice about the possibility of being a whistleblower. On the same day, Matag-ob Mayor Bernandino Tacoy requested the DPWH in Ormoc to stop the repairs of an ongoing flood control project that collapsed before completion. Tacoy wrote to DPWH district engineer Peter Seco, stating that he will not allow the project's continuation without first investigating it, worth ₱96 million (US$1.95 million), in a barangay in Matag-ob. He claimed that 25 to 30 meters (82 to 98 ft) of the structure collapsed, and substandard materials may have been used in the project.

On September 11, 2025, Manila Mayor Isko Moreno said that the Manila City Government had collected over ₱93 million (US$1.89 million) from contractors for flood control projects, with 140 out of 315 issued Statements of Account (SOA) settled. The remaining 175 SOAs are still unpaid, totaling ₱127.28 million (US$2.58 million). He stated that collected funds will be redirected to essential city expenditures, focusing on social services for Manila residents. He warned that contractors failing to meet obligations will be blacklisted and barred from future city projects, with their names also being submitted to DPWH Secretary Dizon for potential exclusion from national projects.

On September 15, the Quezon City government identified 66 flood control projects, representing 20% of the total 331 projects (valued at ₱17 billion (US$345.18 million)) contracted between 2022 and 2025, that had either incorrect or missing coordinates. The lack of proper location data made tracking and verification difficult. Specifically, 35 projects lacked coordinates entirely, and 31 had incorrect coordinates, with 10 of these still under verification.

== Accused parties ==
During the ongoing investigation into the flood control fund controversies, a total of nine senators (both current and former), 32 representatives (current and former), ten national government officials—including five cabinet and cabinet-rank secretaries, four undersecretaries, one member of a constitutional commission, one special envoy, and at least 40 officials from the Department of Public Works and Highways (DPWH) have been implicated.

The Discaya couple composed of Curlee and Sarah Discaya were the primary contractors of numerous flood control projects connected to the scandal. Senator Rodante Marcoleta, in his capacity as committee chair and later as member after he was ousted, was accused by Senator Panfilo Lacson and others of protecting the Discaya couple who were two of the major actors in the flood control scandal where billions of pesos were stolen beginning in the administration of former president Rodrigo Duterte. Marcoleta has pushed several times for the Discaya couple to be included in the witness protection program, which would shield the couple from legal prosecution. He has also stated that the Discayas do not need to return the billions of pesos they stole from public funds to become state witnesses. Because of these incidents, Lacson questioned the motives of Marcoleta regarding the flood control issues and the Discaya couple. It was later revealed that the insurance provider of the Discaya couple's flood control businesses was Stronghold Insurance Corp, where its director was Edna Marcoleta, the wife of senator Marcoleta. After the Blue Ribbon Committee under Lacson provided copies of the official Senate flood control report, Marcoleta and his allies in the Senate refused to sign it since some of their political allies were named in the report, preventing the continuation of the flood control investigations.

== Key findings by officials ==
=== Congress ===
==== Senate ====
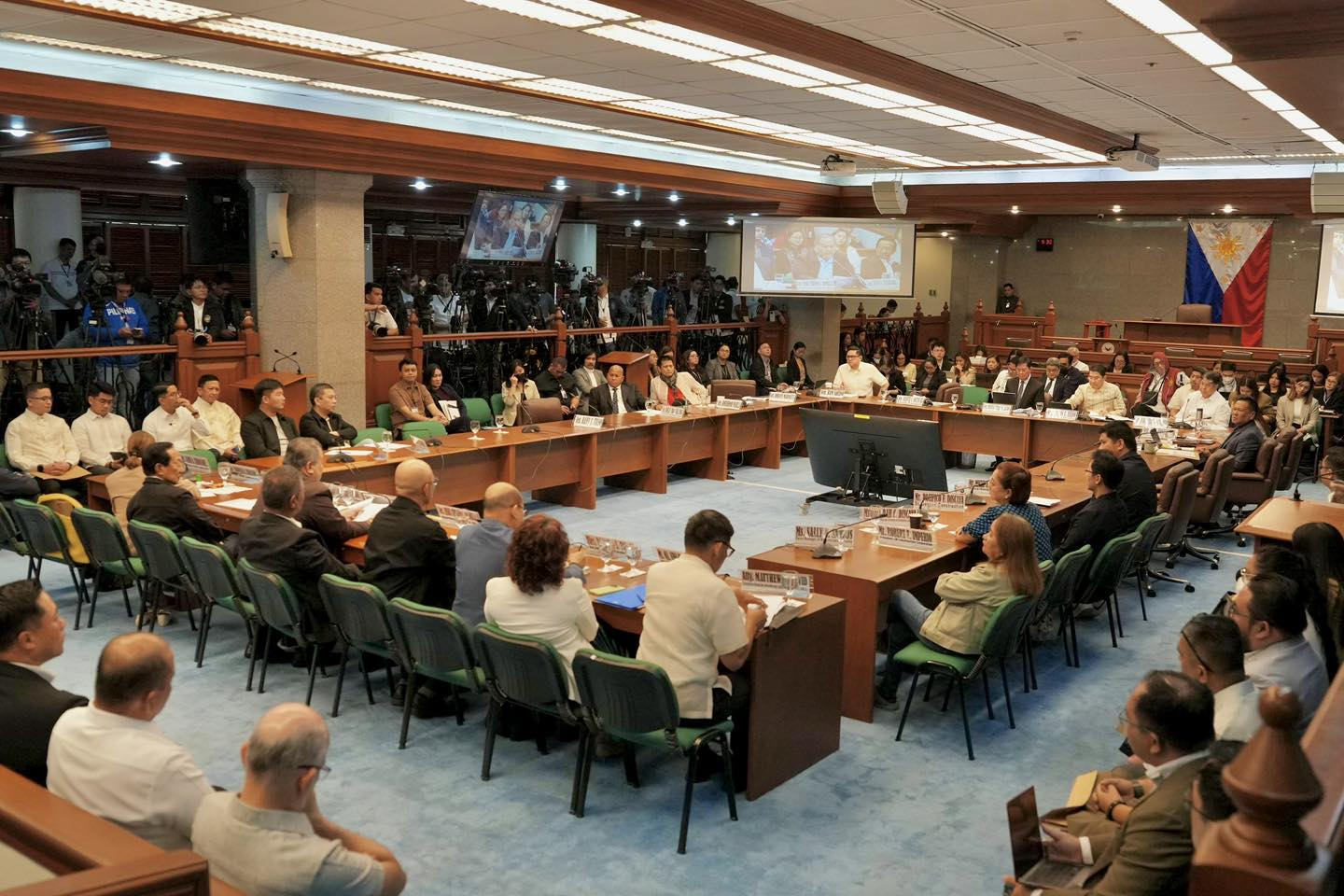
A Senate Blue Ribbon Committee hearing on anomalous flood control projects on September 23, 2025

In July 2025, reports revealed a ₱142.7 billion (US$2.9 billion) insertion in the 2025 national budget, allegedly added during a conference led by former Senate President Francis Escudero.

On July 25, 2025, Senator Panfilo Lacson claimed in a public statement that as much as half of the ₱2 trillion (US$40.61 billion) allocated for flood control over 15 years may have been lost to corruption, with only 40% of project funds translating into actual construction. In his privilege speech titled Flooded Gates of Corruption on August 20, 2025, Lacson cited Bulacan as a hotspot for anomalous projects and linked irregularities to congressional insertions. On September 9, 2025, after Lacson became the newly elected Senate President Pro Tempore, he stated that the Blue Ribbon Committee's investigation into substandard and "ghost" flood control projects will not conflict with Malacañang's plan for an independent commission. He clarified that the Senate inquiry is in aid of legislation, whereas the Palace commission will focus on building cases for prosecution. He also linked Bonoan to a contractor involved in flood control projects in Bulacan, alleging Bonoan had business dealings with Candaba, Pampanga Mayor Rene Maglanque.

In September 2025, Senate Blue Ribbon Committee Chairman Rodante Marcoleta stated that a total of 60 flood-control projects are reportedly being investigated as potential "ghost projects". He stated during a hearing that the figures he presented were derived from data provided by President Marcos, which had been verified in prior hearings.

On September 1, 2025, at the Senate Blue Ribbon Committee's motu proprio inquiry, Senate Deputy Majority Leader JV Ejercito strongly criticized DPWH Region 4 Assistant Regional Director (OIC) Henry Alcantara, who is a former DPWH Bulacan 1st Engineering District engineer. The criticism stemmed from Alcantara's alleged negligence in the approval of flood control projects that are suspected to be anomalous. Furthermore, Ejercito highlighted Alcantara's admission to engaging in frequent casino visits during his tenure in government service. Alcantara acknowledged his failure to exercise proper due diligence in the signing of documents pertaining to ghost projects.

On September 8, 2025, the Senate cited former Bulacan district engineer Brice Hernandez in contempt for allegedly lying before the Senate Blue Ribbon Committee regarding his casino visits. On September 18, the Senate also cited Henry Alcantara in contempt for repeatedly denying knowledge of ghost flood control projects in Bulacan. It also cited Curlee Discaya in contempt for giving inconsistent statements as to the absence of his wife in the Senate hearing.

On September 23, 2025, Remulla stated that the National Bureau of Investigation (NBI) had recommended filing charges against Senators Villanueva and Estrada, Representative Zaldy Co (Ako Bicol), former DPWH Undersecretary Roberto Bernardo, former Representative Mitch Cajayon-Uy (Caloocan-2nd), and Henry Alcantara for indirect bribery and malversation of public funds. He indicated that the NBI and the AMLC were involved in the investigation, particularly concerning the affidavit of Henry Alcantara, who was taken to the DOJ to review his statements and discuss potential witness protection.

At the same time, Alcantara signed an affidavit in a hearing of the Senate Blue Ribbon Committee revealing alleged budget insertions and kickbacks involving former senator Bong Revilla, Senators Estrada and Villanueva. He stated that his actions were directed by Bernardo. Alcantara expressed his intention to assist the investigation for the country's benefit before being taken to the DOJ to swear his affidavit. The affidavit corroborated earlier statements from former DPWH engineers Hernandez and Mendoza, who had previously admitted to the existence of a racket within the Bulacan 1st District Engineering Office.

According to Alcantara, there was a ₱300 million (US$6.09 million) budget insertion in 2024 for Revilla, covering three flood control projects in Plaridel, Bulacan. He claimed that the intended kickback rate for Revilla was increased from 25% to 30% on Bernardo's instructions. Alcantara also alleged that a ₱355 million (US$7.21 million) insertion in 2024 was linked to Estrada, involving seven flood control projects in Hagonoy and Malolos, Bulacan, with an alleged 25% kickback. He stated that he had no direct dealings with Estrada, and that his participation was mediated through Bernardo.

For Villanueva, Alcantara alleged that in 2022 the senator requested multipurpose buildings amounting to ₱1.5 billion (US$30.46 million) ₱1.5 billion, though only ₱600 million (US$12.18 million) that was initially available. Alcantara testified that Bernardo instructed him to provide Villanueva with projects equivalent to ₱150 million (US$3.05 million), which Alcantara said he later delivered in cash through one of Villanueva's staff members at a rest house in Bocaue, Bulacan.

In the same affidavit, Alcantara admitted that he had delivered alleged kickbacks for Representative Co to his house in Pasig and to a parking lot in Taguig. Alcantara had previously denied knowledge of the alleged corruption scheme involving DPWH flood control projects. His latest testimony aligned with claims made by his subordinate, Brice Hernandez, about kickbacks directed to senators Joel Villanueva and Jinggoy Estrada and former senator Bong Revilla.

He stated that the funds originated from advances made by contractors, and that he was in charge of distributing Co's portion to intermediaries referred to as “Alias Paul” and “Alias Mark.” Alcantara asserted that on one or two occasions, the payments were delivered to the parking lot of Shangri-La at the Fort, Manila in Bonifacio Global City, Taguig; alternately, he brought them to Co's residence in Valle Verde 6, Pasig.

Alcantara claimed that Co's demanded share from project budgets rose from 20% in 2022 to 25% in 2023 through 2025. He recalled meeting Co sometime between August and September 2021 at a hotel in Taguig, during which they discussed managing projects in the first district of Bulacan. From 2022 to 2025, Co reportedly advocated for 426 projects in that district, valued in total at ₱35.02 billion (US$711.07 million). According to Alcantara, the kickbacks were given in stages: an initial 10% once a project was entered into the NEP, and the remaining 10–15% after inclusion in the General Appropriations Act (GAA).

Concurrently, Co had denied recent allegations made against him during a Senate Blue Ribbon Committee investigation into questionable infrastructure projects. He described the claims as "false" and did not specify the details of the allegations, which involved accusations from Alcantara and Hernandez regarding budget insertions and kickbacks. Co emphasized his intention to respond to these claims at an appropriate time and venue.

On September 25, 2025, former DPWH Undersecretary Bernardo testified about the involvement of Senator Francis Escudero and former senators Revilla and Nancy Binay, who is now the mayor of Makati, with anomalous flood control projects. He also accused Representative Co and mentioned COA Commissioner Mario G. Lipana, along with implicated DPWH officials Alcantara and Hernandez. Bernardo stated that his allegations were based on personal knowledge and direct interactions with the involved parties. He acknowledged his association with businessman Maynard Ngu who served as the Special Envoy to China (2023–2025) and a known campaign donor of Escudero, who requested a list of projects for the GAA. They concurred on a 20 percent cut for the projects. A peace activist later requested the Independent Commission for Infrastructure to investigate allegations that First Lady Liza Araneta-Marcos and Ngu lobbied to appoint Bernardo to the DPWH.

Simultaneously, Senator Marcoleta presented Orly Regala Guteza, a former soldier of the Philippine Marines who previously worked as a security aide to Representative Co testified before the Senate Blue Ribbon Committee that he regularly delivered luggage filled with cash to former House Speaker Romualdez's residence while working for Representative Co. He served as a security consultant for Co from December 5, 2024, to August 5, 2025, and indicated that similar cash deliveries were made to Co's residence during his tenure as well. Guteza reported that he delivered money to Co's residence at Valle Verde 6, Pasig City, confirmed by sources. He referred to the cash as "basura" (lit. 'Trash'), with each luggage allegedly containing ₱48 million (US$974,619.29) to ₱50 million (US$1.02 million) and notes indicating the amounts. Guteza identified Co's executive assistants, John Paul Estrada and Mark Tecsay, as responsible for receiving and managing the funds.

A lawyer, Petchie Rose Espera, denied any involvement in notarizing or preparing an affidavit presented in the Senate by Guteza. In a letter, Espera stated that the signature and notarial details attributed to her are falsified and unauthorized, demanding the removal of a social media post showing the affidavit, which she deemed it as spurious, fraudulent, and damaging to her reputation as a lawyer and notary public.

Escudero denied accusations tying him to flood control project anomalies, labeling them as part of a "well-orchestrated plan" to undermine the Senate. He stated that the allegations were intended to distract from the real culprits. He denied the allegations made by Bernardo, asserting that Bernardo had never directly contacted him about the matter. He questioned why other prominent individuals were not being held accountable and vowed to contest any charges based on Bernardo's statements.

Makati Mayor Binay also denied accusations made by Bernardo regarding her involvement in anomalies within the DPWH. Binay expressed shock at being implicated, asserting that the claims are false and that she has been focused on her mayoral duties. Bernardo previously alleged that Binay's associate, Carleen Villa, solicited a 15-percent kickback from flood control projects worth ₱250 million (US$5.08 million), stating that he delivered ₱37 million (US$751,269.04) to Binay in Quezon City.

Former House Speaker and Representative Romualdez (Leyte-1st) has rejected allegations regarding receiving money from infrastructure projects, which were supposedly delivered to his home. He clarified that his residence cited in these claims has been under renovation since January 2024. Romualdez criticized the testimony of a witness, Guteza, which was linked to Marcoleta, asserting it is fabricated and aims to erroneously connect him to a kickback scheme. A significant flaw in Guteza's testimony is the assertion that deliveries were made to Romualdez's home in December 2024, a claim he deemed impossible due to the ongoing renovations. Romualdez emphasized the absurdity of the allegation, reinforcing that the renovation left the property unoccupied except for construction workers. He cites the principle "falsus in uno, falsus in omnibus," asserting that if one aspect of the testimony is false, the entire account is unreliable.

Representative Eric Yap (Benguet) also denied allegations of delivering money to Representative Co. He stated that he never participated in such activities, calling the claims untrue and expressing disappointment at being implicated in alleged irregularities that affected his integrity and commitment to serving his constituents.

Executive Secretary Lucas Bersamin denied allegations from former DPWH Undersecretary Roberto Bernardo regarding a claimed "15% agreed commitment" intended for the Office of the Executive Secretary (OES). He asserted that the claims made in Bernardo's sworn affidavit were untrue and emphasized that the OES is not involved in the DPWH budget allocation processes. On November 18, 2025, Malacañang announced the resignation of Bersamin and Budget Secretary Amenah Pangandaman to allow for the two to be subject to further investigation.

DepEd Undersecretary Trygve Olaivar denied involvement in alleged irregularities, where he was accused of receiving a cut. He welcomed any investigation and stated he would take a voluntary leave of absence to cooperate fully with the inquiry.

At a Senate hearing, Senator Ejercito highlighted the "unfunded items" under the Metropolitan Manila Development Authority's (MMDA) billion budget proposal for 2026. The DBM recommended only ₱5.88 billion (US$119.47 million), a 56.66 percent reduction from the total proposal of ₱13.58 billion (US$275.65 million). Some unfunded projects include a ₱300 million (US$6.09 million) rehabilitation improvement along the Manggahan floodwater channel and another along the lower Marikina River.

==== Senate Blue Ribbon Committee partial report and its aftermath ====
On February 10, 2026, the Senate Blue Ribbon Committee approved a draft partial committee report on its investigation into alleged irregularities in flood control projects. Authored by committee chair Senator Panfilo Lacson, the report recommended the conduct of preliminary investigations and the filing of appropriate criminal, civil, and administrative cases against several incumbent and former government officials, lawmakers, and private individuals allegedly involved in the diversion of public funds allocated for flood control projects. The report recommended that the Department of Justice and the Office of the Ombudsman conduct preliminary investigations into Senators Escudero, Villanueva, and Estrada, as well as former Senator Revilla, former Ako Bicol party-list representative Co, and former Caloocan representative Cajayon-Uy, over their alleged involvement in irregular flood control projects. The committee also recommended the continued gathering of evidence against former House Speaker Martin Romualdez and several other current and former government officials whose names surfaced during the hearings. All of the personalities named in the report denied the allegations against them.

The report cited evidence gathered during the committee's hearings indicating the existence of ghost projects, overpricing, irregular project allocations, and kickback schemes involving contractors and public officials. It further recommended reforms in the budgeting and implementation of flood control projects, including stricter oversight of infrastructure appropriations and procurement processes.

Under Senate rules, at least nine signatures from the committee's seventeen members were required before the report could be sponsored and presented to the Senate plenary. Despite repeated appeals from Lacson, the report failed to secure the necessary support. By April 14, 2026, only four senators had signed the document, while by May 6, 2026 the number had increased to seven, still short of the required threshold. Unable to obtain the required number of signatures, the committee did not formally report out its findings to the Senate plenary. Lacson instead transmitted the partial committee report and supporting evidence to the Office of the Ombudsman for use in its ongoing investigation into the alleged flood control scandal.

The committee's work was disrupted following a change in Senate leadership. On May 12, 2026, Senator Alan Peter Cayetano was elected Senate President, replacing Senator Tito Sotto. A subsequent reorganization of Senate committees resulted in the removal of Lacson as chairperson of the Blue Ribbon Committee. On May 20, 2026, Senator Pia Cayetano was elected as the committee's new chairperson, while Lacson was retained as vice chairperson.

Following the reorganization, Senators Rodante Marcoleta and Jinggoy Estrada were elected vice chairpersons of the committee. On May 29, 2026, Senate President Cayetano announced the creation of a Blue Ribbon subcommittee to continue the flood control investigation, with Marcoleta designated to head the panel and preside over future hearings. The planned subcommittee drew criticism from Senate Minority Leader Sotto, who questioned its legality and argued that the creation of a Senate subcommittee required proper authorization by the plenary. However one of the committee's vice chairpersons, Senator Jinggoy Estrada, was later charged by the Office of the Ombudsman in connection with the flood control scandal. He surrendered to authorities on June 1, 2026 after the Sandiganbayan issued a warrant for his arrest on plunder charges.

==== House of Representatives ====
Representative Mark Anthony Santos (Las Piñas) also disclosed that 42 DPWH projects in his city, including flood control and drainage works, were also implemented without permits. He also urged the sacking of the DPWH district engineer.

Representative Isidro Ungab (Davao City–3rd) stated that Official Development Assistance (ODA) funds have been removed from the NEP for both 2024 and 2025. He disclosed that ₱40.2 billion (US$816.24 million) billion of the ₱49.1 billion (US$996.95 million) billion allocated for flood control projects in 2024-2025 through ODA funds had been diverted from its intended purpose. He also stated that the allocations for the next two years will fund 11 large-scale, high-impact ODA projects, with ₱21.6 billion (US$438.58 million) allocated for 2024 and ₱27.5 billion (US$558.38 million) for 2025, totaling ₱49.1 billion (US$996.95 million).

On August 30, 2025, the House of Representatives invited the DPWH and 15 contractors, who have secured 20% of nearly 10,000 flood control projects since 2022, to its hearing on September 2. During an interview on DZMM, Representative Terry Ridon (Bicol Saro) also invited SYMS Construction Trading, in which the firm was involved in an alleged "ghost" flood project in Baliwag, Bulacan. He also explained that the investigation will involve the accreditation-for-sale process in GPBB, and the procurement board will handle the procurement process with the BIR and COA.

On August 31, 2025, Representative Marcelino Teodoro (Marikina–1st) announced that the 2026 NEP that was submitted by DBM had allocated funding for completed flood control projects and road repairs. Teodoro confirmed House Deputy Speaker Ronaldo Puno's (Antipolo–1st) disclosure that several items in the NEP included budget allocations for completed projects. On the same day, Representative Leandro Leviste (Batangas–1st) emphasized the need for a technical audit of the DPWH flood control projects in his district. He collaborated with affected local government units and hired engineers and consultants at his own expense. He led inspections in Balayan, Batangas, after the arrest of the district engineer who had attempted to bribe him. He found that sheet piles in flood control projects along the Binambang River were shorter than required, measuring 3.9 to 5.5 meters (13 to 18 ft) instead of the required 15 meters (49 ft). The DPWH replaced the shorter piles at the contractor's expense, but Leviste has yet to receive an explanation from the DPWH.

Given concerns on erroneous inclusions in the 2026 NEP, including allegations that completed flood control projects were slated to receive funding, the House of Representatives committee on appropriations deferred briefings on the DPWH budget during its hearing on September 5, 2025. The committee asked DPWH and DBM to submit a list of errata for their respective budgets by September 12. DPWH Secretary Dizon confirmed that they will adhere to the given deadlines, stressing that the agency will prioritize fixing errors but that a full refresh of the agency budget may require internal discussions extending beyond the deadline. Dizon also stated that he is open to reducing the DPWH's proposed 2026 budget of ₱881 billion (US$17.89 billion) if needed.

Representative Edgar Erice (Caloocan–2nd) expressed concern over the potential consequences of removing the DPWH's ₱255 billion (US$5.18 billion) budget allocated for locally funded flood control projects, asserting that such a move, coupled with Representative Zaldy Co's alleged "antics" related to a flood control scandal, would negatively affect Filipinos. Erice further criticized ₱1.37 trillion (US$27.82 billion) in diversions and insertions within the budget, asserting that the populace would bear the brunt of future flooding if these well-intentioned but previously failed projects were not continued.

On September 17, 2025, Martin Romualdez (Leyte–1st) resigned as House Speaker amid mounting criticism over his and other lawmakers' alleged involvement in the flood control issue. He was replaced by Bojie Dy (Isabela–6th).

On September 24, 2025, Representative Terry Ridon (Bicol Saro) announced that the House of Representatives would suspend its hearing into the flood control irregularities and turn over all transcripts, documents, and other relevant evidence from its investigation to the ICI.

On September 29, Zaldy Co resigned from the House of Representatives. He went into hiding after charges were filed against him over the scandal but was arrested in Prague, Czech Republic on April 16, 2026, for unlawful entry into the country.

On April 13, 2026, Representative Arnulf Bryan Fuentebella, along with DPWH officials and private contractors were charged with graft and corruption complaints related to the collapse of two flood control projects in the province. Taxpayer Romeo Penilla filed a complaint with the Deputy Ombudsman for Luzon, alleging that a 60-meter flood control structure along the Sagñay River collapsed and a 743-meter seawall in a town in Garchitorena was washed out, both of which were reported as completed and fully paid.

On September 7, 2026, Martin Romualdez was arrested while seeking medical treatment at the Cardinal Santos Medical Center in San Juan, Metro Manila on charges of plunder relating to the flood control scandal.

=== Ombudsman ===
Since late 2025, the Office of the Ombudsman has filed a series of criminal cases against several politicians, contractors, and DPWH officials over their alleged involvement in the flood control corruption scandal.

On September 2, 2025, the Office of the Ombudsman mandated the filing of cases against individuals and private organizations implicated in alleged irregularities during the bidding and execution phases of national and local flood control projects. A directive issued on August 22, spanning two pages, established a 13-member panel tasked with investigating transactions and initiating charges when deemed appropriate. An order was issued under the authority of acting Ombudsman Mariflor Punzalan Castillo, mandated a special panel to conduct a swift investigation, collect evidence, and propose recommendations for criminal and administrative actions against those responsible for irregularities in flood control contracts.

On September 18, 2025, the Office of the Ombudsman ordered the preventive suspension of 16 personnel from the DPWH Bulacan 1st District Engineering Office due to allegations of ghost flood control projects worth ₱389.6 million (US$7.91 million). Acting Ombudsman Dante F. Vargas issued the suspension to maintain the integrity of the investigation.

On November 18, 2025, the Office of the Ombudsman filed graft, malversation, and related charges against former Ako Bicol representative Zaldy Co, DPWH officials, and executives of Sunwest Construction over an alleged ₱289.5 million anomalous flood control project in Oriental Mindoro. Following the issuance of arrest warrants by the Sandiganbayan, several of his co-accused were arrested or surrendered to authorities, while Co went into hiding and left the Philippines before he could be taken into custody.

On December 10, 2025, President Bongbong Marcos announced that Co's Philippine passport had been cancelled, directing government agencies and Philippine embassies to coordinate efforts to secure his return to the Philippines.

Co was arrested in Prague, Czech Republic, on April 16, 2026 pursuant to an international manhunt launched by Philippine authorities. Czech authorities subsequently released Co from custody pending proceedings. Philippine officials later stated that Co had left the Czech Republic after his release and remained outside Philippine jurisdiction despite the cancellation of his passport and ongoing efforts to secure his return.

On December 5, 2025, the Ombudsman filed graft and malversation charges against contractor Sarah Discaya, officers of St. Timothy Construction, and several DPWH officials over an alleged ₱96.5 million "ghost" flood control project in Davao Occidental. Following the filing of the cases, arrest warrants were issued against Discaya and her co-accused. Discaya later surrendered to the National Bureau of Investigation and was placed under government custody pending court proceedings. On December 16, 2025, the Sandiganbayan granted a motion to transfer the venue of the case from Davao City to Cebu City due to security and administrative considerations surrounding the proceedings."Sandigan grants transfer of Discaya case to Cebu". Philippine News Agency. December 16, 2025.

On January 16, 2026, the Ombudsman filed graft and malversation charges before the Sandiganbayan against former Senator Bong Revilla, former DPWH engineers Brice Hernandez and Jaypee Mendoza, and several other public works personnel over an alleged ₱112 million flood control project in Pandi, Bulacan, which investigators alleged was a ghost project despite having been fully funded and paid for by the government. Following the issuance of arrest warrants, Revilla surrendered to authorities on January 20, 2026. Hernandez and Mendoza were subsequently arrested by agents of the National Bureau of Investigation (NBI) and placed under government custody in connection with the same case.

On May 28, 2026, the Ombudsman filed plunder, bribery, and multiple counts of graft and corruption against Senator Jinggoy Estrada, former DPWH Secretary Manuel Bonoan, and several former public works officials over alleged kickbacks from ₱1.4 billion worth of flood control projects in Bulacan. After posting bail for the graft charges on May 29, 2026, Estrada and Bonoan surrendered on June 1, 2026 after the Sandiganbayan issued warrants for the non-bailable plunder charges. Estrada was detained at the Quezon City Jail in Payatas, while Bonoan was placed under government custody.

=== Local chief executives ===
Several local chief executives have made revelations about flood control projects, often pointing to issues of inefficiency, corruption, or lack of coordination between national and local agencies. They have stressed that the DPWH must coordinate with them first before the actual execution of the project, also citing Sections 26 and 27 of the Local Government Code.

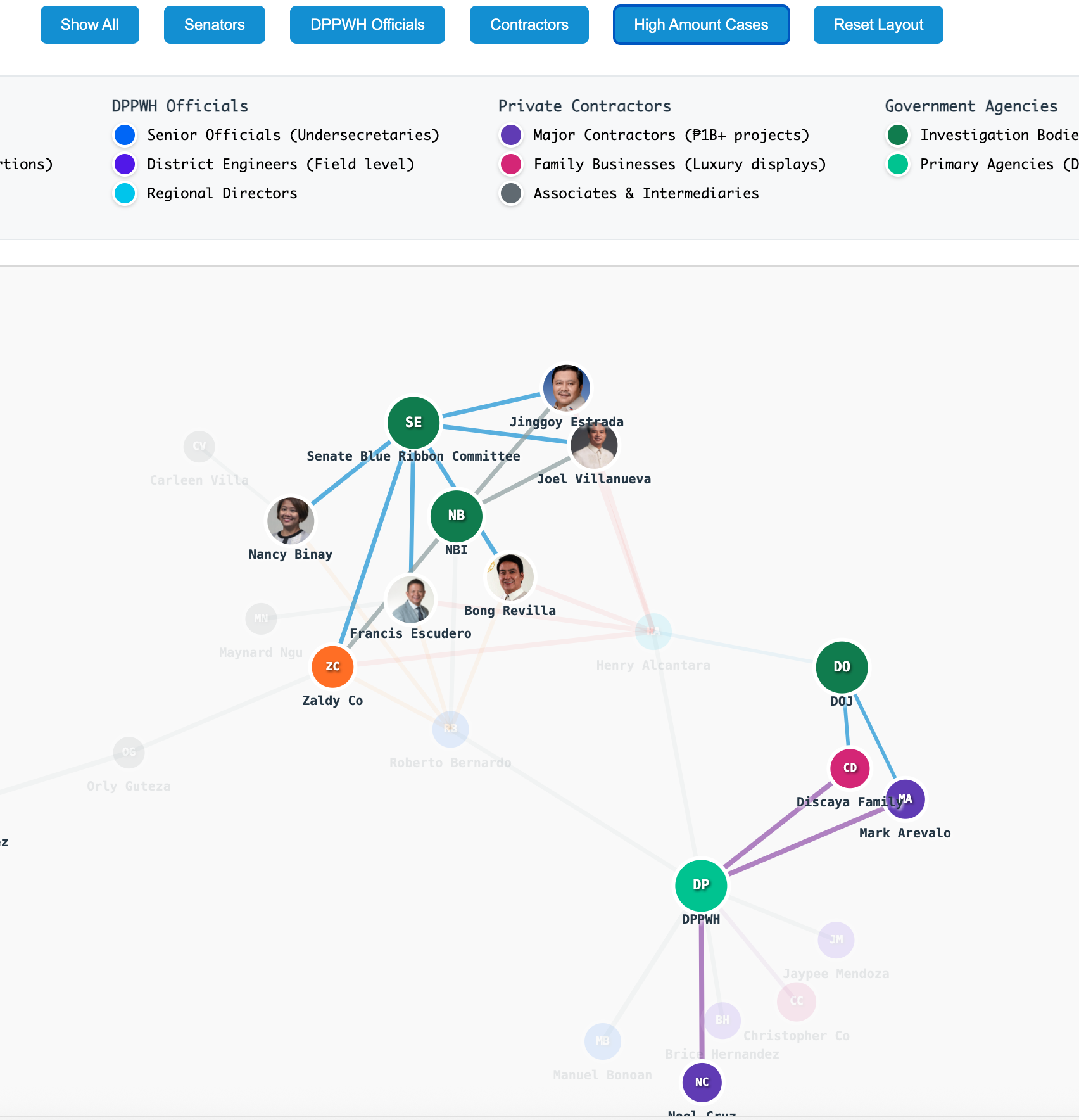
Graph of the Persons linked to the scandal by Budots Media Philippines

In August 2025, the DPWH halted the ₱757 million (US$15.37 million) flood control projects in Cebu City for 2025, pending a comprehensive assessment by Cebu City Mayor Nestor Archival. As of that month, the DPWH had completed 10 projects in the North District, worth ₱272 million (US$5.52 million), and 11 in the South District, worth ₱479 million (US$9.73 million). He criticized several flood control projects in Cebu City for poor coordination with the local government, leading to public inconvenience. One project in Banilad was criticized for contributing to worsening traffic congestion. A project near JY Square was executed urgently but was suspended due to a lack of coordination with city authorities.

On August 15, 2025, Baguio Mayor Benjamin Magalong revealed that only 30% of the allocated budget remained for the actual flood control projects, resulting in substandard quality. Based on information from contractors, he also claimed that some lawmakers allegedly received kickbacks worth 40% of a project's budget.

On August 26, 2025, Manila Mayor Isko Moreno revealed that more than 200 flood control projects of DPWH in the capital worth ₱14 billion (US$284.26 million) were implemented without permits. Four days prior, questioning why Manila was still being flooded despite having the largest flood control project allocation, he asked the Senate Blue Ribbon Committee to probe flood control projects in the city, particularly in the second, third and sixth districts, which are represented by his former allies Rolan Valeriano, Joel Chua, and Benny Abante, respectively. The three representatives welcomed the investigation. On September 4, Moreno also revealed that there are over 300 flood-control projects in the capital where contractors still owe taxes amounting at most ₱255 million (US$5.18 million).

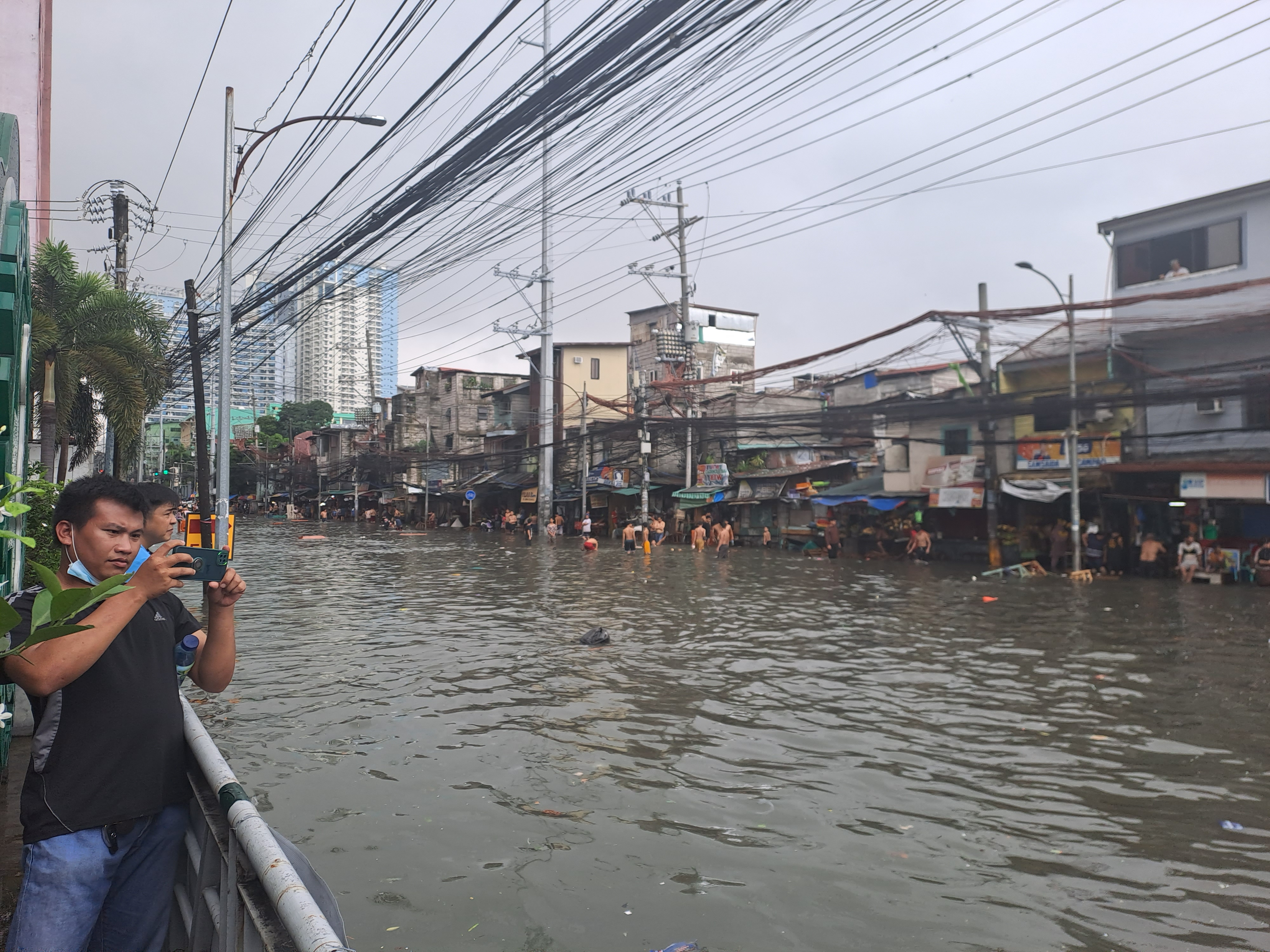
Flash flood along E. Rodriguez Sr. Avenue in Quezon City on September 23, 2023, due to heavy rains.

Similarly, on August 29, 2025, Quezon City Mayor Joy Belmonte flagged the flood control projects of the DPWH in the city, alleging anomalies as only two out of the 254 were approved by the city government. Among those flagged is a 66-phase project involving the San Juan River. Out of 254 flood control projects worth ₱14.24 billion (US$289.14 million), only 16 out of 254 attempted to apply for a certificate of coordination, as the remaining projects had disapproved, incomplete, or lacking certificates. In addition, Quezon City Engineer Mark Dale Peral disclosed that of the 1,652 national projects in the city, only 315 were submitted for a Certificate of Coordination, with just 138 of those receiving approval. He also noted that an inspection found that some projects declared complete were actually under construction, while 45 were verified as ongoing. On September 2, the Quezon City Disaster Risk Reduction and Management revealed that the damaged dike along Tullahan River in barangay North Fairview is that of the DPWH.

=== Climate Change Commission ===
On September 26, 2025, the Climate Change Commission (CCC) announced that the DPWH's expenses allocated ₱360 billion (US$7.31 billion) for flood control projects in 2025. This information was revealed during budget deliberations for the CCC's proposed ₱183 million (US$3.72 million) budget for 2026. In response to questioning by Representative Renee Co (Kabataan), Representative Edvic Yap (ACT-CIS Partylist) noted that DPWH's total climate change expenses amounted to ₱754 billion (US$15.31 billion), which included the flood control funding.

=== Jurisdiction ===
In April 2026, prosecutors from the Sandiganbayan Third Division inspected the site of a claimed ₱92.8 million (US$1.88 million) flood control project in Pandi, Bulacan, where they found no evidence of the project's existence. The project, initially reported as 95% complete, relates to the malversation case against former senator Bong Revilla. Associate Justice Karl Miranda, chairman of the Sandiganbayan Third Division, oversaw an inspection with members of the DPWH Bulacan 1st District Engineering Office and prosecutors. Officer Kenneth Fernando stated that no significant structures were found at the site, confirming the prosecution's claim that the project was a "ghost project". The ocular inspection during the bail petition hearing in the malversation case involving Revilla and former Bulacan 1st DEO officials followed conflicting testimonies from two prosecution witnesses regarding the project's location. An NBI witness incorrectly identified a site adjacent to the actual project area, which DPWH Bulacan officials later confirmed had visible but unfinished structures.

== Private sector, civil society, and party-list group responses ==
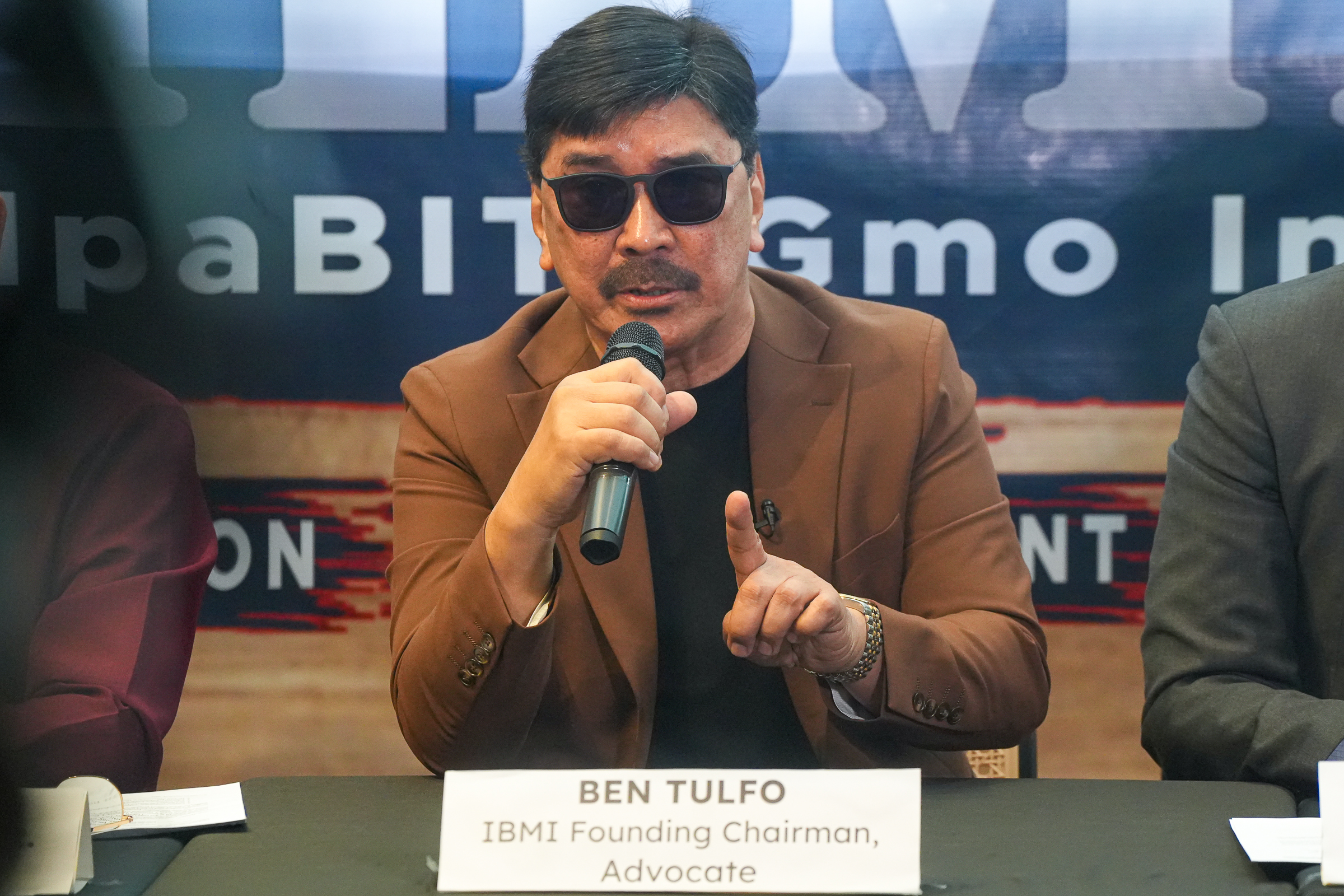
Ben Tulfo in a press conference on August 29, 2025, asking the Office of the Ombudsman to launch an immediate investigation into alleged ghost flood control projects

In August 2025, broadcaster Ben Tulfo of BITAG Media Unlimited Inc. filed a letter-request to the Office of the Ombudsman asking them to launch its own motu proprio investigation into the alleged "ghost" flood control projects of the DPWH. On social media, he also actively questioned the Ombudsman's silence.

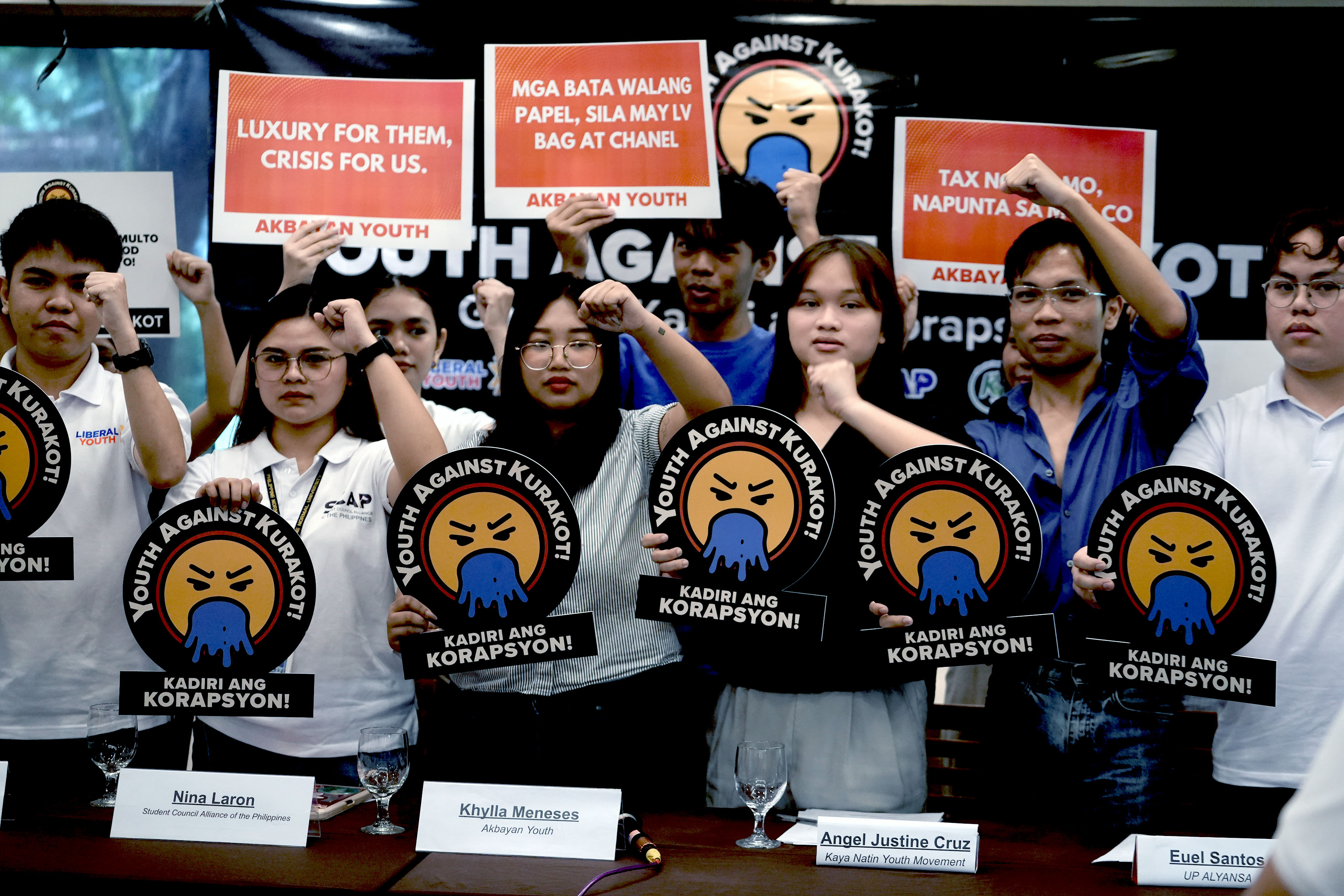
Launching of Youth Against Kurakot (YAK!) in Quezon City

On September 3, 2025, Youth Against Kurakot (YAK!), a student-led coalition demanding accountability from corrupt officials, was launched by progressive youth groups. (Note: Kurakot means “corrupt” in Tagalog, while YAK! denotes “yuck".)

=== Statements ===
In a joint statement on September 4, 2025, 30 Philippine business groups called for an independent investigation into alleged corruption in government-funded flood control projects, stressing that accountability should extend to both the DPWH and Congress. The groups, including the Philippine Chamber of Commerce and Industry, urged prosecutions, recovery of misused funds, and the punishment of corrupt officials. They outlined measures such as gathering evidence, blacklisting implicated contractors and businessmen, promoting integrity pledges, and working with banks and regulators to uncover unexplained wealth and money laundering.

A separate statement released by the American Chamber of Commerce of the Philippines on September 5, 2025, also demanded increased accountability for flood control projects, emphasizing that corruption continues to stifle competitiveness and economic growth. It reiterated the organization's call for reforms towards financial transparency, oversight over public institutions, and ease of doing business.

Another joint statement signed by over 300 private sector groups, civil society organizations, and individuals as of September 7, 2025, expressed outrage over the flood control controversy and called for greater accountability and transparency for infrastructure projects. The statement urged the DPWH and DBM to create an independent and multisectoral review committee to review and resubmit projects proposals for 2026. It also called for the abolishment of opaque congressional insertions, increased transparency for flood control project reporting, and proactive disclosure of project documents to enable civic monitoring.

The Catholic Bishops' Conference of the Philippines (CBCP) released a statement on September 6, 2025, signed by CBCP president Cardinal Pablo Virgilio David urging the return of funds lost due to flood control project anomalies and calling on the public to demand accountability measures such as expedited audits and criminal punishment. The Society of Jesus Social Apostolate under the Philippine Jesuits also called for an independent commission to investigate anomalies given the alleged complicity of Congress.

The University of the Philippines (UP) criticized purported ghost flood control projects and advocated for fiscal governance reforms to guarantee accountability and prevent corruption. UP President Angelo Jimenez stated that the institution cannot "remain neutral" regarding the issue of deep-seated and massive corruption in the country's flood control projects, viewing it with the gravest concern.

Labor unions and organizations have called on the national government to accelerate investigations into irregular flood control projects, aiming for swift accountability. The Philippine Trade and General Workers Organization (PTGWO) suggested that operationalizing the Independent Commission for Flood Control Project would expedite the process of determining culpability.

In December 2025, Alyansa Tigil Mina and other environmental groups pushed for the passage of an anti-dynasty law, pointing out alleged links between corruption, political dynasties, and mining companies. A report by Alyansa Tigil Mina and Global Witness pointed out links between Martin Romualdez and Marcventures Mining and Development Corporation, Benguet Corporation, and Brightgreen Resources Corporation. "When politicians are beneficial owners or when politicians are part of the value chain of mining operations, we cannot expect compliance with environmental laws and other regulatory policies", said Alyansa Tigil Mina.

=== Protests ===
Unlike the violent anti-corruption protests that happened in Nepal and Indonesia in 2025, Philippine protests were smaller and peaceful in early September 2025. Most Filipinos vented their frustrations online including Catholic Church leaders and Filipino business executives. According to Matthew David Ordonez, a political science lecturer at De La Salle University, repeated corruption scandals such as the impeachment trials against Vice President Sara Duterte had caused "scandal fatigue" in the Philippines. Since September 4, 2025, a series of widespread demonstrations have been held nationwide and overseas, with large protests occurring on September 21 during the anniversary of Marcos's martial law and November 30 on the birth anniversary of Andres Bonifacio. Protests continued as of January 2026.

==== September 4 ====
A group of protesters including flood survivors and members of environmental groups such as Kalikasan hurled mud at the gate of Discaya-owned St. Gerrard Construction headquarters in Pasig and spray-painted the words "magnanakaw" (transl. "thief"), "corrupt," and "ikulong" (transl. "jail them") on the property gates. In response to the incident, Mayor Vico Sotto and the Malacañang through presidential spokesperson Claire Castro separately appealed that they refrain from any acts of violence. Various police agencies are exploring possible charges to be filed against protesters in coordination with the Discayas who have confirmed plans to formally file a complaint. The National Capital Region Police Office (NCRPO) also described plans to deploy around 2,000 police officers to keep the peace for future demonstrations.

On the same day, around 60 Anakbayan members organized a rally at the DPWH headquarters in Port Area, Manila, to denounce the mismanagement of flood control funds, with protesters hurling dirty water and rotten vegetables at Manila Police District (MPD) personnel. Manila Mayor Isko Moreno later stated that the city will not tolerate any disruptive activities.

==== September 5 ====
Separate protests occurred at the DPWH Cebu City District Engineering Office and the Batasang Pambansa Complex in Quezon City, the seat of the House of Representatives. Members of progressive groups such as Bagong Alyansang Makabayan (Bayan) Central Visayas, Sanlakas Cebu, and Kabataan expressed frustration over irregular flood control projects and threw tomatoes at the DPWH District Engineering Office logo. DPWH Cebu City District chairperson Malou Avila acknowledged the concerns raised and appealed for patience, with the Cebu City Police Office noting that the protest activities were peaceful with no untoward incidents occurring. Various protesters under the Bayan alliance also held a protest at the Batasang Pambansa Complex criticizing ineffective flood control projects, hurling paint and clashing with Quezon City Police District riot control police. No injuries or arrests were initially noted, although the police district later stated that eight police officers were injured and that the agency will be pursuing legal action against protesters.

==== September 11 ====
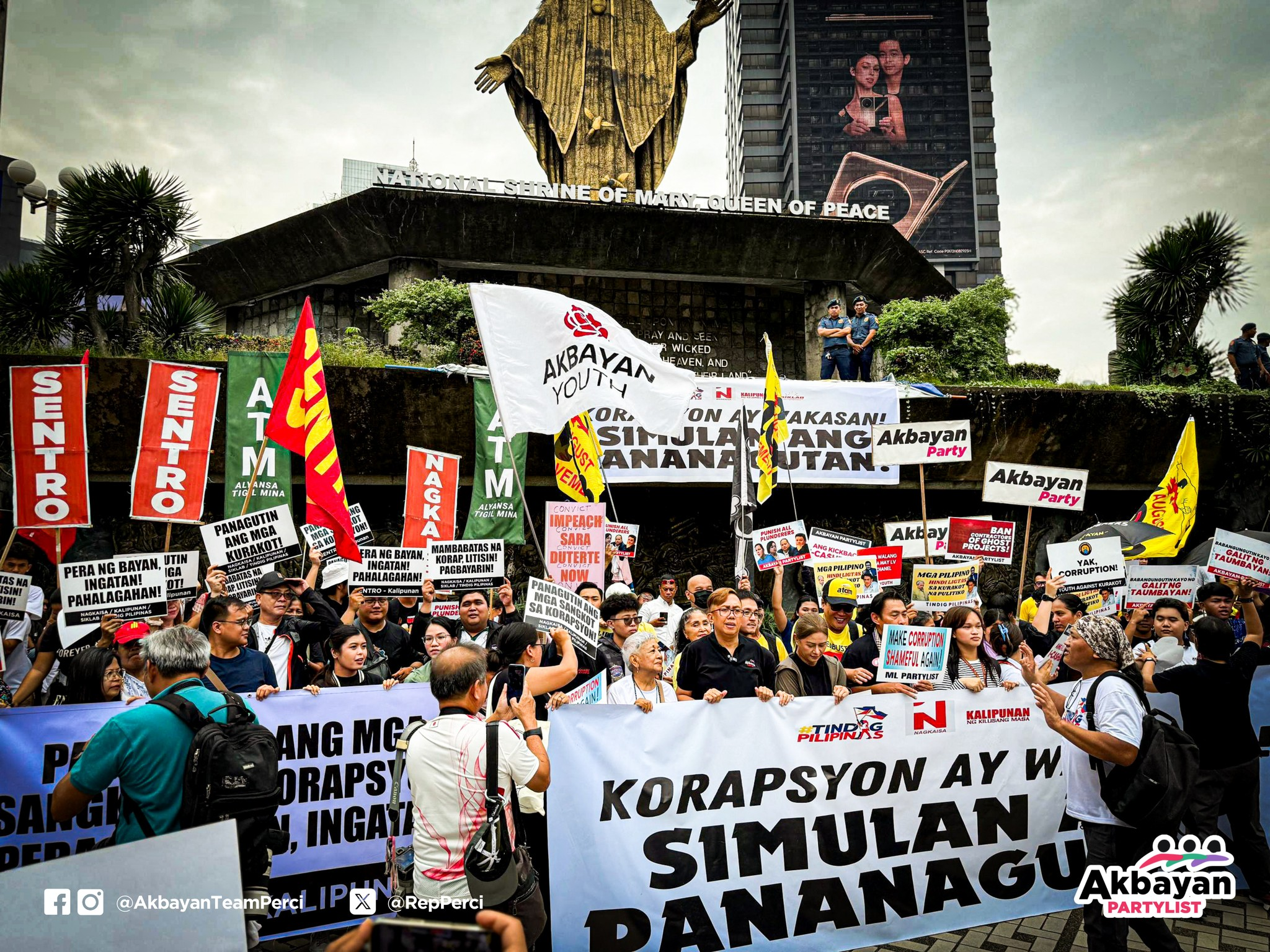
A protest rally at the EDSA Shrine on September 11, 2025, which called for accountability of involved government officials and contractors.

Around 200 protesters conducted a rally in front of the EDSA Shrine in Quezon City to call for accountability of involved government officials and contractors. The rally was led by groups such as Akbayan Youth, Tindig Pilipinas, and SIKLAB. Similar protests are planned at the same location on September 13.

==== September 12 ====
Protest rallies were held in 13 parts of Metro Manila, including the Black Friday classroom walkout with an estimated 3,000 to 5,000 participants gathering at the University of the Philippines' Palma Hall. Protests were also held in UP Diliman, UP Tacloban, UP Mindanao, as well as Leyte Normal University led by Anakbayan and the League of Filipino Students. Protests continued the day after led by youth groups in Manila mobilizing students from Far Eastern University, Adamson University, De La Salle University and Technological University of the Philippines. The Philippine National Police later stated that it monitored 13 rallies conducted across Metro Manila, including the Black Friday protest, and stated that all events were generally peaceful with no untoward incidents recorded.

==== September 13 ====
Various progressive groups including Anakbayan, Bayan NCR, Kabataan, and Panday Sining marched from the EDSA Shrine to the People Power Monument in Quezon City to protest flood control project anomalies. The Quezon City Police District estimated the crowd size at around 300 individuals. Traffic slowdown near the area was noted, but police noted that the protest activity was peaceful with no untoward incidents.

==== September 14 ====
More than 150 cyclists joined the #KontrakTOUR Bike Protest Against Corruption on a bike protest ride from Quezon Memorial Circle to Luneta Park to call for accountability from government officials. In Marikina City, over 500 runners held the Takbo Laban sa Korapsyon.

==== September 17 ====
Transport group Manibela initiated a planned three-day transport strike to protest against government corruption amid the flood control project controversy. Protests activities were conducted in Quezon City, Baguio, Pangasinan, Bacolod, Legazpi, Ormoc, Samar, and Davao, with around 100,000 members expected to participate. After receiving appeals from the Department of Transportation (DOTr), Land Transportation Franchising and Regulatory Board (LTFRB), Land Transportation Office (LTO), and various civil society groups, Manibela cut short its strike on the afternoon of September 18. Another transport group, PISTON, held its own one-day transport strike on September 18. Several colleges and universities in Metro Manila have shifted to online classes given the expected disruption in public transportation. The Philippine National Police stated that the first day of the Manibela transport strike was generally peaceful and orderly.

==== September 21 ====
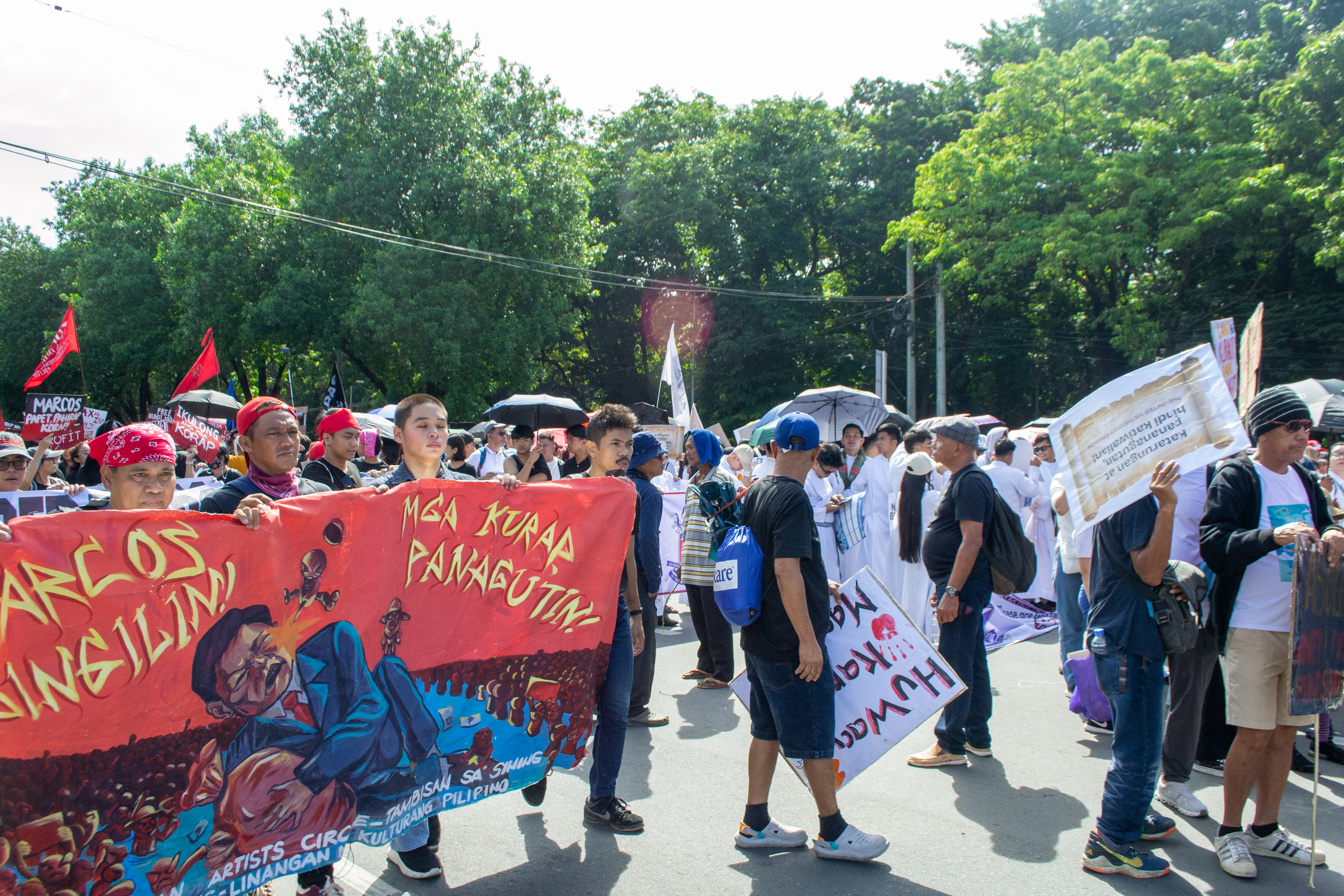
Protestors call for government accountability during the Baha sa Luneta demonstration at Rizal Park.

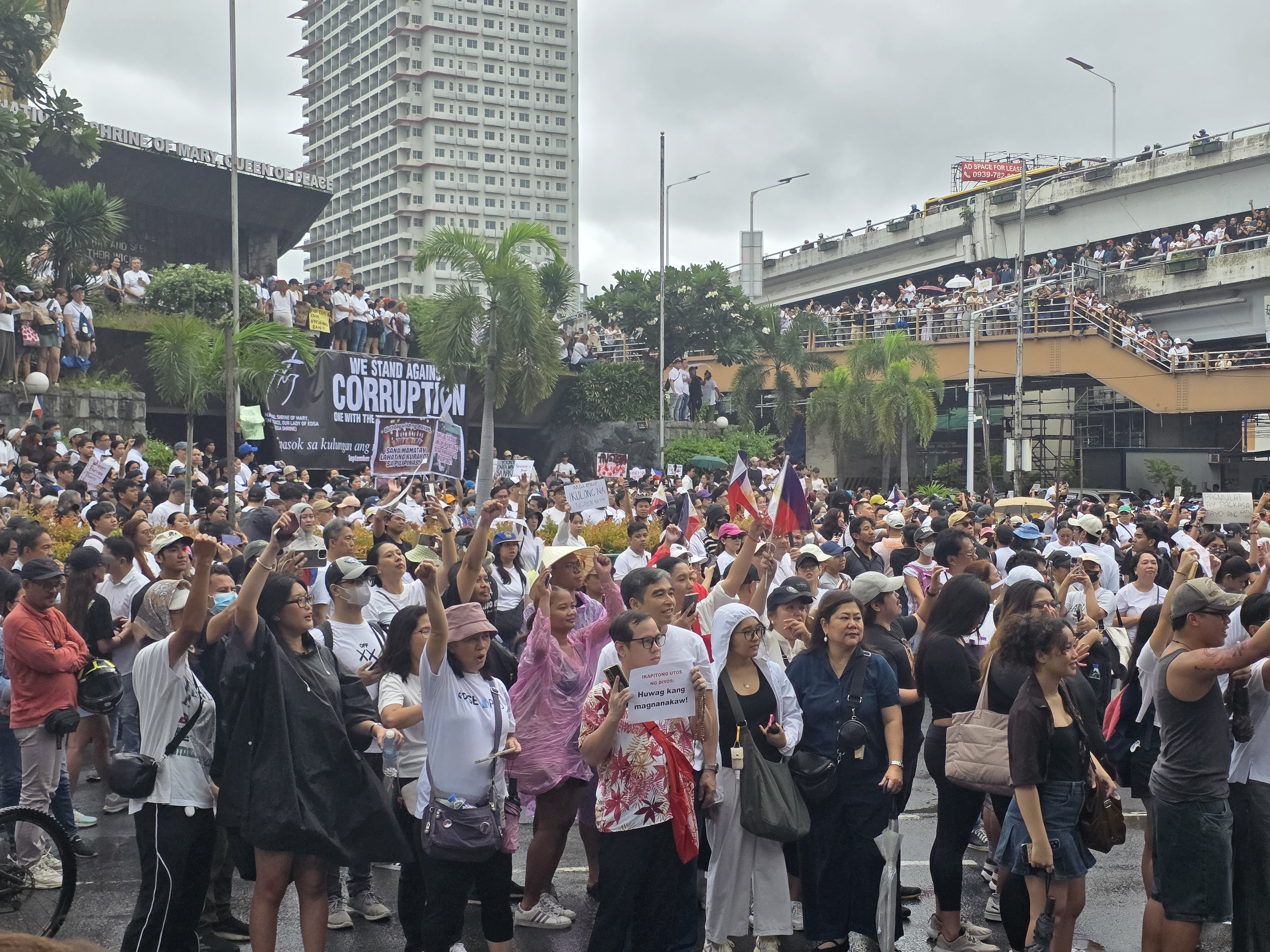
Protestors congregate during the Trillion Peso March at the People Power Monument along EDSA.

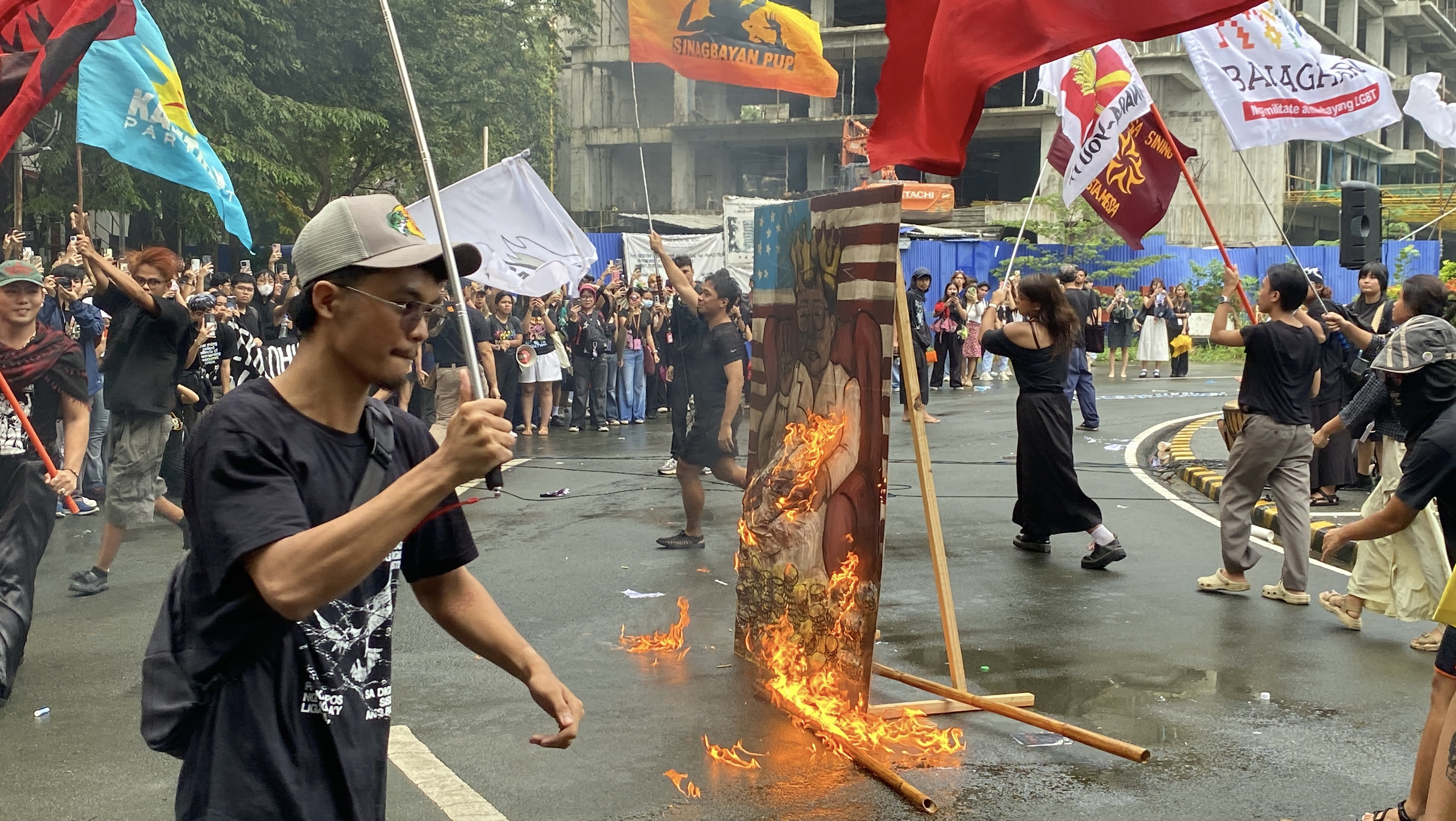
15,000 students of the Polytechnic University of the Philippines walked out on October 10 and burned an effigy of President Marcos Jr.

On September 21, 2025, several mass demonstrations were conducted within the National Capital Region and other locations nationwide to protest anomalies in flood control projects and other issues of systemic corruption. These rallies coincided with the anniversary of the 1972 declaration (Note: While Proclamation No. 1081 was signed on September 21, Martial law was announced via televised address two days later on September 23.) of martial law by former President Ferdinand Marcos Protesters flocked to Rizal Park in Manila to conduct the "Baha sa Luneta: Aksyon Laban sa Korapsyon" (transl. "Flood at Luneta: Action Against Corruption") rally starting at 9 am, led by the Taumbayan Ayaw sa Magnanakaw at Abusado Network Alliance (transl. "People Against Thieves and Abusers Network Alliance"), or TAMA NA. An estimated 49,000 to 100,000 protesters were in attendance. In the afternoon, another large demonstration named the "Trillion Peso March" was led by various civil society groups, political and religious organizations, students and private citizens. The event was conducted at the People Power Monument along EDSA, Quezon City, with around 30,000 participants expected to join. Various organizations also conducted other anti-corruption demonstrations in Laoag, Tuguegarao, San Fernando, La Union, Olongapo, Baguio, Pangasinan, Iloilo City, Bacolod, Cebu City, Dumaguete, and Cagayan de Oro.

In parallel with the September 21 protest rallies, several violent clashes were noted in multiple locations across Manila. Protesters in Mendiola Street threw rocks and alleged Molotov cocktails at police officers guarding the pathway to Malacañang Palace, leading to over 200 arrests and allegedly injuring 39 police officers. Protesters also set ablaze a trailer truck and a police motorcycle on Ayala Bridge. Some police reportedly deployed water cannons and retaliated by throwing rocks and firing tear gas at protesters. A group of teenagers clashed with police along Recto Avenue by hurling objects and reportedly ransacking a Hotel Sogo branch. The National Union of People's Lawyers alleged that police beat up and tortured detainees at the police tent at Mendiola and at the Manila Police District facility. The riots were estimated to have resulted in approximately ₱10.4 million (US$211,167.51) in damage to both public infrastructure and private property. The Manila Police District has arrested 190 protesters as of September 23. The Department of Health recorded 48 individuals hospitalized with one fatality.

Youth groups described the police actions during the anti-corruption demonstrations as violent and "brutal". At a protest rally on September 22 outside the PNP headquarter outside Camp Crame, Samahan ng Progresibong Kabataan (SPARK) called for an investigation of police involved in the dispersal of protests around the country.

==== September 29 ====
Thousands of students from the Far Eastern University and the University of Santo Tomas (UST) organized walkout protests condemning widespread corruption amid the flood control projects controversy. The protest is of particular significance to the UST community given that the university itself is located in a flood-prone area and has experienced frequent flooding during the rainy season.

== Stock market ==
Due to the flood scandals, the Philippine peso weakened as the Philippine Stock Exchange Index fell by 1.5% for a seven straight session and reached a five-month low in September 2025, the worst since around 9 months earlier. The Philippines' Securities and Exchange Commission (SEC) stated that the scandals had impacted public confidence in the country. The SEC initially revealed that ₱1.7 trillion (US$34.52 billion) in market value of Philippine Stock Exchange-listed companies have been "wiped out" in three weeks from August 11 to 29, 2025. This figure was later adjusted to ₱185 billion (US$3.76 billion) in market capitalization after SEC Chairperson Francis Lim announced that the initial estimate was based on an industry report that he later found to be fictitious. In October 2025, the International Monetary Fund (IMF) lowered to the Philippines' 2025 growth forecast from 5.5 percent to 5.4 percent.

== International reactions ==
Filipino business leaders and economists closely paid attention to the flood control controversy due to its impact on foreign investments. The Philippine Chamber of Commerce and Industry (PCCI) warned that if the issue is left unaddressed, foreign institutions will hold back giving loans to the Philippines.

=== South Korea ===
In September 2025, South Korea suspended its US$503 million infrastructure loan to the Philippines for a bridge-building project over corruption concerns. According to The Hankyoreh, the modular bridge project involved building 350 bridges in the Philippines. This suspension by South Korean President Lee Jae Myung came amid allegations of Philippine flood control project anomalies. The Philippines, in response, insisted that no such agreement was signed. The Philippines also claimed that the loan agreement with South Korea was scrapped in 2024.

=== Japan ===
Amid the flood control scandals, Finance Secretary Ralph Recto led a Philippine delegation on September 11, 2025, to court the Japanese government and seek investors. Japan had assured that the state would continue to extend low-cost loans for the Philippines' infrastructure projects.

=== European companies ===
The European Chamber of Commerce of the Philippines (ECCP) noted a reduction in sales among European construction companies due to graft probes conducted by the Philippines, including allegations of their links with certain politicians and contractors in the flood scandals. European Union (EU) Ambassador Massimo Santoro, reflecting on the flood scandals, expressed that corruption is a key concern in the Philippines. He also stated that the EU's Generalised Scheme of Preferences Plus (GSP+) privilege given to the Philippines is not permanent.

== See also ==
- 2025 Philippine anti-corruption protests
- Corruption in the Philippines
- Poverty in the Philippines
- List of -gate scandals and controversies
