= Philippines Witness Protection Program =

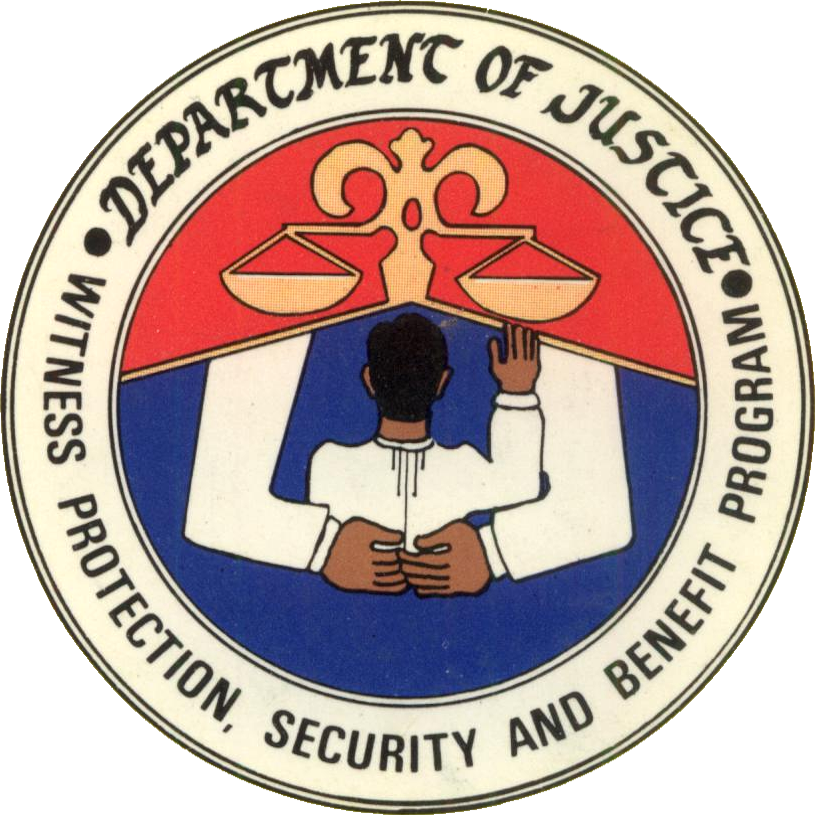
- Administered by: Department of Justice
- Codified under: Republic Act No. 6981
- Year established: 1991
- Annual budget: ₱424.18 million (2025)
- Authorized by: Witness Protection, Security and Benefit Act of 1991

The Witness Protection, Security and Benefit Program (WPSBP) or simply the Witness Protection Program (WPP) is the witness protection scheme by the Philippine government. It is codified under Republic Act No. 6981.

A state witness under the WPP are accused but is determined to be the "least guilty" in a crime. They are free from criminal liability and given protection by the Department of Justice (DOJ) in exchange of full cooperation in investigations. Other persons may be given protection by the DOJ without being a state witness.

== Background ==
The Witness Protection, Security and Benefit Program (WPSBP) or the Witness Protection Program (WPP) was institutionalized by Republic Act No. 6981 or the Witness Protection, Security and Benefit Act on April 21, 1991.

== State witnesses ==
Beneficiaries of the witness protection program are referred to as "state witnesses". They people who express willingness to provide testimony before a court, quasi-judicial body, and investigating authorities. It mandates the Department of Justice to provide protection to witnesses of "grave crimes". A state witness in a case is drawn among the accused.

=== Qualification ===
The qualification to become a state witness are:

- The offense in which his testimony will be used is a grave felony as defined under the Revised Penal Code or its equivalent under special laws;
- There is absolute necessity for their testimony
- There is no other direct evidence available for the proper prosecution of the offense committed:
- Their testimony can be substantially corroborated on its material points
- They do not appear to be most guilty; and
- They have not at any time been convicted of any crime involving moral turpitude

A person is admitted as a state witness upon entering a memorandum of agreement with the Department of Justice where their responsibilities are defined such as compliances with "legal obligations and civil judgments" levied against them.

A key qualification is that a state witness is the "least guilty" and not a principal of a given crime.

Relatives up to the second degree of consanguinity or affinity are also qualified to be state witnesses as long as they face threat on their lives or bodily injury. Law enforcement agents are not qualified to become state witnesses themselves but their relatives could still qualify.

=== Benefits and obligations ===
A state witness is afforded protection by the state and are freed from criminal liability in exchange for full cooperation in investigations.

People who are under the WPP as state witnesses are given housing, security escorts, as well as medical and livelihood assistance. The government provides financial aid for the burial of killed state witnesses as well as their dependent children if any.

In 1995, the Department of Justice entered in an agreement with the Philippine Overseas Employment Administration (POEA), that state witnesses may choose to be relocated and employed abroad.

== Protected witnesses ==
A "protected witness" is an ordinary individual with knowledge of a crime who is willing to make a testimony. They are also provided security and financial and medical aid by the state but are not state witnesses.

== List of state witnesses ==
- Jessica Alfaro – 1991 Vizconde murders
- Aurelio Centeno and Vicencio Malabanan – 1993 Murders of Eileen Sarmenta and Allan Gomez

== Reform ==
Theodore Te of the Free Legal Assistance Group (FLAG) made a proposal in August 2022, that law enforcement agents be made eligible under the WPP so they can testify for extrajudicial killing cases.
