= Manuel Bonoan =

Filipino businessman (born 1945)

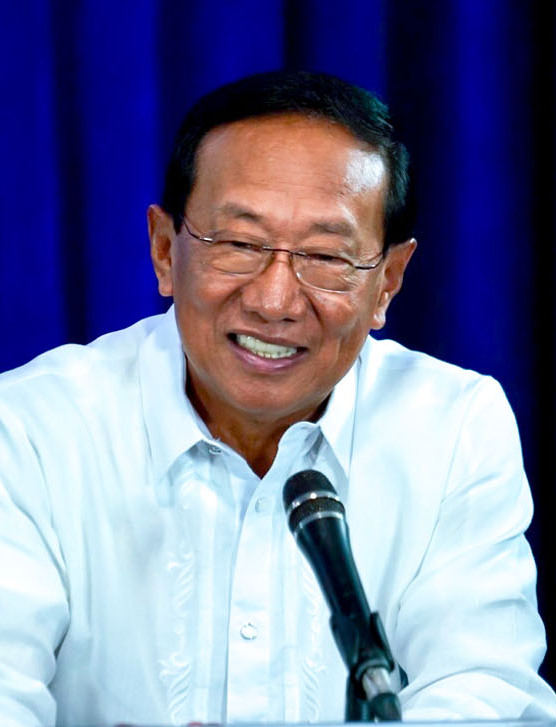
- Bonoan in 2023

40th Secretary of Public Works and Highways
- In office June 30, 2022 – September 1, 2025
- President: Bongbong Marcos
- Preceded by: Roger Mercado (acting)
- Succeeded by: Vince Dizon (Acting)
- Acting; February 1, 2007 – July 4, 2007
- President: Gloria Macapagal Arroyo
- Preceded by: Hermogenes Ebdane Jr.
- Succeeded by: Hermogenes Ebdane Jr.

Personal details
- Born: August 5, 1945 (age 81)
- Spouse: Yolanda S. Bonoan
- Children: 2, inc. Fatima Gay
- Profession: Engineer

Manuel Manligas Bonoan (born August 5, 1945) is a Filipino engineer and businessman who served as the 40th secretary of public works and highways from June 30, 2022 until his resignation on September 1, 2025. An associate of the DPWH since 1967, he had previously served as secretary in an acting capacity in 2007. Bonoan was the president and chief executive officer of SMC Tollways.

== Education ==
Bonoan received his degree in civil engineering from the Mapúa Institute of Technology in the late 1960s.

Bonoan later acquired a graduate degree in highway engineering at the University of New South Wales in Australia.

== Career ==
=== Government ===
Bonoan began working at the Department of Public Works and Highways (DPWH) in 1967, when he was in his senior year in college and the agency was named the Department of Public Works, Transportation and Communications (DPWTC). He served as assistant secretary for planning during the tenures of Presidents Corazon Aquino and Fidel V. Ramos, and as undersecretary during the tenures of Presidents Joseph Estrada and Gloria Macapagal Arroyo. Bonoan also served as acting director of the Mt. Pinatubo Rehabilitation-Project Management Office (MPR-PMO) in 1996 and as chairman of the Pre-qualification, Bids and Awards Committee (PBAC) for Construction Projects in Visayas and Mindanao in the early 2000s. During Arroyo's administration, he served as acting secretary of the DPWH from February to July 2007.

President-elect Bongbong Marcos selected Bonoan to lead the DPWH when Marcos assumed the presidency in June 2022. He succeeded acting secretary Roger Mercado, who had in turn succeeded Mark Villar who resigned for a senatorial campaign in the 2022 elections. He pledged for the continuation of unfinished projects and "public-private partnership[s]" under the Build! Build! Build! program of President Rodrigo Duterte, as well as prioritize the checking of river basins for flood control projects and pursue ventures that would help the agriculture and tourism industries. Bonoan instructed DPWH Undersecretary Cathy Cabral to create the Baselined, Balanced and Managed (BBM) Parametric Formula that was used to compute the DPWH budget beginning 2023 when the Marcos government first enacted a national budget.

During a hearing of the Senate Blue Ribbon committee on August 19, 2025, Bonoan stated that he was aware that the DPWH is implementing "ghost" projects in Bulacan and other locations, including flood control projects awarded to contractor Wawao Builders Corporation. Bonoan formed the DPWH Anti-Graft and Corrupt Practices Committee on August 28, though the committee was dissolved by his successor who said that it was improper for the DPWH to lead the investigation into corruption in the department. On August 30, 2025, announced that he will not resign as DPWH chair following instructions from President Marcos to investigate anomalous, substandard, and ghost projects under his department. He resigned from the post effective September 1, 2025, amidst the flood control projects controversy.

In November 2025, former DPWH undersecretary Roberto Bernardo alleged that Mark Villar, Manuel Bonoan, and Cathy Cabral ran a kickback scheme at the DPWH. Cabral, under Villar and later under Bonoan, made additions or insertions to the proposed national budget to ensure which projects get funded. Cabral and Bonoan also allegedly reserved some DPWH "allocable" budget "for their preferred projects". From 2022 to 2025, Bernardo alleged that he handled 15% kickbacks exceeding ₱5 billion per year.

Ombudsman Jesus Crispin Remulla announced on June 29, 2026 that Bonoan would be a state witness and charges against him will be dropped.

=== Business ===
Bonoan was a president and chief executive officer of SMC Tollways, the operator of Skyway, NAIA Expressway, South Luzon Expressway, the Southern Tagalog Arterial Road, and Tarlac–Pangasinan–La Union Expressway tollways. He was also president of the Skyway O&M Corporation, the operator of Skyway and NAIA Expressway led by Ramon Ang, prior to his involvement with SMC Tollways.

== Personal life ==
Bonoan is married to Yolanda S. Bonoan; they have two children. His daughter, Fatima Gay, is a real estate broker currently serving as COO and treasurer of the MBB Global Properties Corp., which owns the Wyndham Garden hotel in Clark Freeport, Angeles City, Pampanga. Bonoan is a resident of Solsona, Ilocos Norte.

Political offices
Preceded by Hermogenes Ebdane Jr. as Acting Secretary of Public Works and Highways	Secretary of Public Works and Highways; Acting; 2007	Succeeded by Hermogenes Ebdane Jr.
Preceded by Roger Mercado as Acting Secretary of Public Works and Highways	Secretary of Public Works and Highways; 2022–2025	Succeeded by Vince Dizon
