= Rafael Yabut =

Filipino engineer and government official (born 1953)

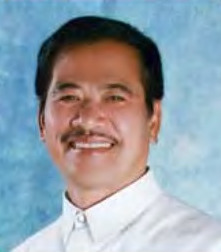
- Yabut in 2008

Secretary of Public Works and Highways
- Acting
- In office June 30, 2016 – July 31, 2016
- President: Rodrigo Duterte
- Preceded by: Rogelio Singson
- Succeeded by: Mark Villar

Undersecretary of the Public Works and Highways
- In office January 14, 2008 – June 30, 2016
- President: Gloria Macapagal Arroyo; Benigno Aquino III

Assistant Secretary of the Public Works and Highways
- In office September 18, 2003 – January 13, 2008
- President: Gloria Macapagal Arroyo

Personal details
- Born: Rafael Cunanan Yabut; April 26, 1953 (age 73) Candaba, Pampanga
- Spouse: Helen P. Drapeza
- Children: 3
- Education: Angeles University Foundation (BS, MPA); Holy Angel University (BS)
- Profession: Engineer

Rafael "Pye" Cunanan Yabut (born April 26, 1953) is a Filipino engineer. He was as the acting secretary of Department of Public Works and Highways for a month and as Undersecretary for Unified Project Management Office Operations of DPWH from January 14, 2008, until his retirement last June 2016. He was also the alternate representative of the Secretary to the Toll Regulatory Board. He served as Acting Secretary under the Duterte administration from July 1, 2016, until Mark Villar assumed the post by end of July 2016.

== Early life and education ==
Yabut was born in Candaba in Pampanga province on April 26, 1953. His parents are Ernesto Yabut and Felipa Cunanan. He took up Bachelor of Science in Civil Engineering at Angeles University Foundation and graduated in 1976. He then took up Bachelor of Science in Sanitary engineering at Holy Angel University in Angeles, Pampanga where he graduated in 1983. He completed his master's degree in Public Administration at Angeles University Foundation in 1996.

== Career ==
Yabut started to work as laborer in DPWH office in Angeles, Pampanga in 1975 a year before his graduation from college. As district engineer of Pampanga First District Engineering Office, he used to supervised the "Operation Baklas Billboards" and cleared the national roads of Pampanga of illegal structures and obstructions. In 2003, he was appointed as Assistant Secretary of DPWH being the youngest among the executive committee. On January 14, 2008, he was appointed as DPWH undersecretary by then President Gloria Macapagal Arroyo. Yabut is known as the main official implementing the department's toll roads, including those projects under the Public-Private Partnership program. His last project was the Cavite–Laguna Expressway before retiring last June 2015 to care for his aging parents. By July 1, 2016, however, he was designated as the acting Secretary of Department of Public Works and Highways until Mark Villar assumes office by July 26 or 27.
