= Secretary for Public Works =

Secretary for Public Works may refer to:

- Secretary for Public Works (New South Wales), a minister in the government of New South Wales, Australia
- Secretary for Public Works (Queensland) a minister in the government of Queensland, Australia

== See also ==
- Secretary of Public Works and Highways, a head of a Filipino government department
