= Secretary of Transportation (Philippines) =

Department of Transportation Secretaries

- Kalihim ng Transportasyon
- Official seal of the Department of Transportation

- Incumbent; Vince Dizon; Acting since October 26, 2026
- Style: The Honorable
- Member of: Cabinet
- Appointer: The president with the consent of the Commission on Appointments
- Term length: No fixed term
- Inaugural holder: Maximino Paterno
- Formation: January 23, 1899 (127 years ago)
- Website: dotr.gov.ph

The secretary of transportation (Filipino: Kalihim ng Transportasyon) is the head of the Department of Transportation and is a member of the president's Cabinet.

The current acting secretary is Vince Dizon since October 26, 2026.

== List of secretaries of transportation ==
=== Secretary of Public Works and Communications (1899) ===
Portrait	Name (Birth–Death)	Took office	Left office	President
	Maximino Paterno	May 7, 1899	November 13, 1899	Emilio Aguinaldo

=== Secretary of Public Works and Communications (1933–1935) ===
Portrait	Name (Birth–Death)	Took office	Left office	Governor-General
	Filemon Perez	January 1, 1933	January 2, 1933	Theodore Roosevelt Jr.
	Antonio de las Alas (1889–1983)	January 26, 1933	November 15, 1935	Theodore Roosevelt Jr.
	Antonio de las Alas (1889–1983)	January 26, 1933	November 15, 1935	Frank Murphy

=== Secretary of Public Works and Communications (1935–1941) ===
Portrait	Name (Birth–Death)	Took office	Left office	President
	Antonio de las Alas (1889–1983)	November 15, 1935	February 18, 1936	Manuel L. Quezon
	Mariano Jesús Cuenco (1888–1964)	1936	1939	Manuel L. Quezon
	José Avelino (1890–1986)	1939	1941	Manuel L. Quezon
	Sotero Baluyut (1889–1975)	1941	1941	Manuel L. Quezon

=== Secretary of National Defense, Public Works, Communications and Labor (1941–1944) ===
Portrait	Name (Birth–Death)	Took office	Left office	President
	Basilio Valdes (1892–1970)	December 24, 1941	August 1, 1944	Manuel L. Quezon

=== Commissioner of Public Works and Communications (1942–1943) ===
Portrait	Name (Birth–Death)	Took office	Left office	Chairman of the Philippine Executive Commission
	Quintín Paredes (1884–1973)	January 26, 1942	October 14, 1943	Jorge B. Vargas

=== Minister of Public Works and Communications (1942–1943) ===
Portrait	Name (Birth–Death)	Took office	Left office	President
	Quintín Paredes (1884–1973)	October 19, 1943	August 24, 1944	Jose P. Laurel
	Jose Paez	August 24, 1944	1945	Jose P. Laurel

=== Secretary of Public Works and Communications (1945–1951) ===
Portrait	Name (Birth–Death)	Took office	Left office	President
	Sotero Cabahug (1891–1963)	March 8, 1945	May 28, 1946	Sergio Osmeña
	Ricardo Nepomuceno	May 28, 1946	1949	Manuel Roxas
	Ricardo Nepomuceno	May 28, 1946	1949	Elpidio Quirino
	Prospero Sanidad (1897–1969)	June 29, 1949	1951	Elpidio Quirino

=== Secretary of Public Works, Transportation and Communications (1951–1978) ===
Portrait	Name (Birth–Death)	Took office	Left office	President
	Sotero Baluyut (1889–1975)	January 6, 1951	1952	Elpidio Quirino
	Pablo Lorenzo	May 6, 1952	1953	Elpidio Quirino
	Vicente Ylagan Orosa Sr.	March 10, 1954	1955	Ramon Magsaysay
	Florencio Moreno	April 30, 1955	December 30, 1961	Ramon Magsaysay
	Florencio Moreno	April 30, 1955	December 30, 1961	Carlos P. Garcia
	Marciano Bautista	1961	1962	Diosdado Macapagal
	Paulino Cases	1962	1962	Diosdado Macapagal
	Brigido Valencia	1962	1963	Diosdado Macapagal
	Jorge Abad	1963	1965	Diosdado Macapagal
	Antonio Raquiza (1908–1999)	August 24, 1966	1968	Ferdinand Marcos
	Rene Espina (1929–2019)	November 1968	September 1969	Ferdinand Marcos
	Manuel Syquio	September 1969	1970	Ferdinand Marcos
	David Consunji (1921–2017)	1970	1975	Ferdinand Marcos
	Alfredo Juinio (1918–2003)	1975	1978	Ferdinand Marcos

=== Minister of Public Works, Transportation and Communications (1978–1979) ===
Portrait	Name (Birth–Death)	Took office	Left office	President
	Alfredo Juinio (1918–2003)	1974	1979	Ferdinand Marcos

=== Minister of Transportation and Communications (1979–1987) ===
Portrait	Name (Birth–Death)	Took office	Left office	President
	Jose Dans Jr (1928-1998)	1979	1986	Ferdinand Marcos
	Hernando Perez (born 1939)	February 25, 1986	February 11, 1987	Corazon Aquino

=== Secretary of Transportation and Communications (1987–2016) ===
Portrait	Name (Birth–Death)	Took office	Left office	President
	Hernando Perez (born 1939)	February 11, 1987	March 16, 1987	Corazon Aquino
	Rainerio Reyes	March 16, 1987	January 3, 1990	Corazon Aquino
	Oscar Orbos (born 1951)	January 3, 1990	December 9, 1990	Corazon Aquino
	Arturo Corona	1990	1992	Corazon Aquino
	Pete Nicomedes Prado	1992	1992	Corazon Aquino
	Jesus Garcia	July 1, 1992	April 1, 1996	Fidel V. Ramos
	Amado Lagdameo Jr.	April 1, 1996	April 16, 1997	Fidel V. Ramos
	Arturo Enrile (1940–1998)	April 16, 1997	January 14, 1998	Fidel V. Ramos
	Josefina Lichauco	January 15, 1998	June 30, 1998	Fidel V. Ramos
	Vicente Rivera	June 30, 1998	January 20, 2001	Joseph Estrada
	Pantaleon Alvarez (born 1958)	January 20, 2001	July 3, 2002	Gloria Macapagal Arroyo
	Leandro Mendoza (1946–2013)	July 3, 2002	February 23, 2010	Gloria Macapagal Arroyo
	Anneli Lontoc; Acting	March 9, 2010	June 30, 2010	Gloria Macapagal Arroyo
	Jose de Jesus	June 30, 2010	July 4, 2011	Benigno Aquino III
	Mar Roxas (born 1957)	July 4, 2011	October 18, 2012	Benigno Aquino III
	Jun Abaya (born 1966)	October 18, 2012	June 30, 2016	Benigno Aquino III

=== Secretary of Transportation (since 2016) ===
Portrait	Name (Birth–Death)	Took office	Left office	President
	Arthur Tugade (born 1946)	June 30, 2016	June 30, 2022	Rodrigo Duterte
	Jaime Bautista (born 1957)	June 30, 2022	February 21, 2025	Bongbong Marcos
	Vince Dizon (born 1974)	February 21, 2025	August 31, 2025	Bongbong Marcos
	Giovanni Z. Lopez (born 1980); Acting	September 1, 2025	October 26, 2026	Bongbong Marcos
	Vince Dizon (born 1974); Acting	October 26, 2026	Incumbent	Bongbong Marcos
