= Vince Dizon =

Filipino government official (born 1974)

- Official portrait, 2026

41st Secretary of Transportation
- Incumbent
- Assumed office October 26, 2026
- President: Bongbong Marcos
- Preceded by: Giovanni Z. Lopez (acting)
- In office February 21, 2025 – September 1, 2025
- President: Bongbong Marcos
- Preceded by: Jaime Bautista
- Succeeded by: Giovanni Z. Lopez (acting)

Secretary of Public Works and Highways
- Acting
- In office September 1, 2025 – October 26, 2026
- President: Bongbong Marcos
- Preceded by: Manuel Bonoan
- Succeeded by: Giovanni Z. Lopez (ad interim)

Presidential Adviser for COVID-19 Response
- In office November 23, 2021 – June 30, 2022
- Appointed by: Rodrigo Duterte
- Preceded by: Position established

IATF-EID Testing Czar
- In office March 16, 2020 – June 30, 2022
- Appointed by: Rodrigo Duterte
- Preceded by: Position established
- Succeeded by: Task force deactivated

Deputy Chief Implementer of the National Task Force Against COVID-19
- In office March 16, 2020 – June 30, 2022
- Appointed by: Rodrigo Duterte
- Preceded by: Position established
- Succeeded by: Task force deactivated

Presidential Adviser for Flagship Programs and Projects
- In office August 27, 2019 – June 30, 2022
- Appointed by: Rodrigo Duterte
- Preceded by: Position established

President and CEO of the Bases Conversion and Development Authority
- In office August 6, 2016 – October 15, 2021
- Appointed by: Rodrigo Duterte
- Preceded by: Arnel Paciano Casanova
- Succeeded by: Aristotle Batuhan

Personal details
- Born: Vivencio Bringas Dizon; August 18, 1974 (age 52) Quezon City, Philippines
- Spouse: Essie Romero
- Children: 1
- Education: De La Salle University (B.A., BComm.); University of Reading (M.S.)
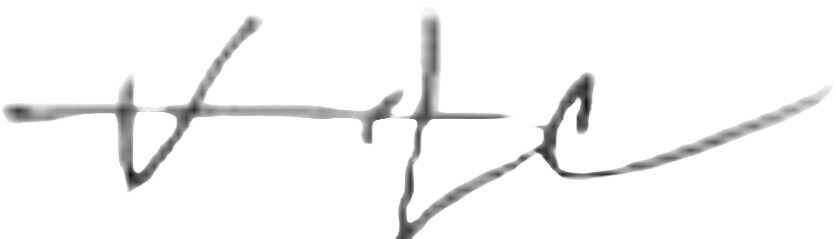
- Signature

Vivencio "Vince" Bringas Dizon GCrL (born August 18, 1974) also known as Vince Dizon, is a Filipino economist, consultant, and political aide who has served as the 41st secretary of transportation since October 2026, a position he previously held from February to September 2025, both times under President Bongbong Marcos. He previously served as the acting secretary of public works and highways under the same president from September 2025 to October 2026. He also served as former president Rodrigo Duterte's adviser on flagship programs and projects, deputy chief implementer of the National Action Plan Against COVID-19, and president and CEO of the Bases Conversion and Development Authority.

== Early life and education ==
Dizon was born on August 18, 1974, in Quezon City to Agustin Coronel Dizon and Melanie Borbon Bringas but spent most of his childhood in Porac, Pampanga.

He attended Don Bosco Technical College for high school. From 1991 to 1996, he studied at De La Salle University (DLSU) where he earned a Bachelor of Arts degree in economics and a Bachelor of Science in Commerce degree in Management of Financial Institutions. While there, he was a representative, and in 1995, became the President of the Student Council of De La Salle University, running under the political party of Alyansang Tapat sa Lasallista. He was a consistent member of the Dean's Honors List and was awarded an Outstanding Thesis in Finance.

From 1998 to 1999, while a recipient of the British Chevening Scholarship Award, Dizon went to the University of Reading for his master's degree. He graduated in December 1999 with a Master of Science degree in Applied Developmental Studies.

== Early career ==
After his undergraduate studies, from 1996 to 1998, Dizon worked as an economic staffer to Senate President Edgardo Angara. He also served as his chief of staff from 2002 to 2004.

From 1999 to 2002, he was an assistant professor of economics at DLSU. In 2004, he worked for the presidential campaign of Fernando Poe Jr. as a close-in assistant. After the 2004 elections, Dizon moved to the Czech Republic, where he worked at the University of Northern Virginia Prague Campus as a senior lecturer in economics, finance, and statistics.

From 2007 to 2011, Dizon was the vice president for Corporate Communications of Strategic Alliance Holdings – Technologies. He then entered government again in 2011, during the term of President Benigno Aquino III, when he became an undersecretary at the Office of the Political Adviser under the Office of the President. He served in that position until 2013, when he then became a consultant to Senate Majority Leader Alan Peter Cayetano. He worked for Cayetano until July 2016.

== Bases Conversion and Development Authority (2016–2021) ==
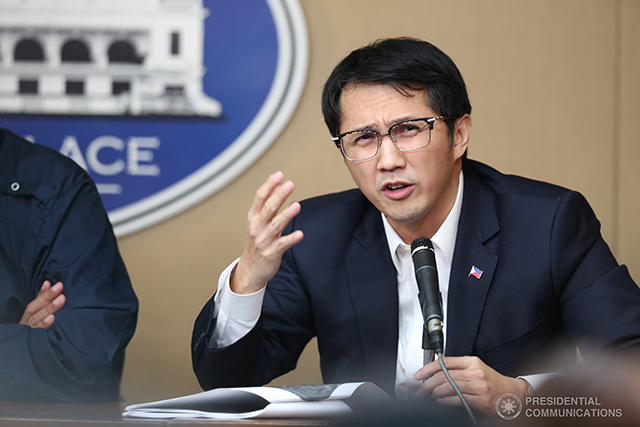
Dizon in 2016

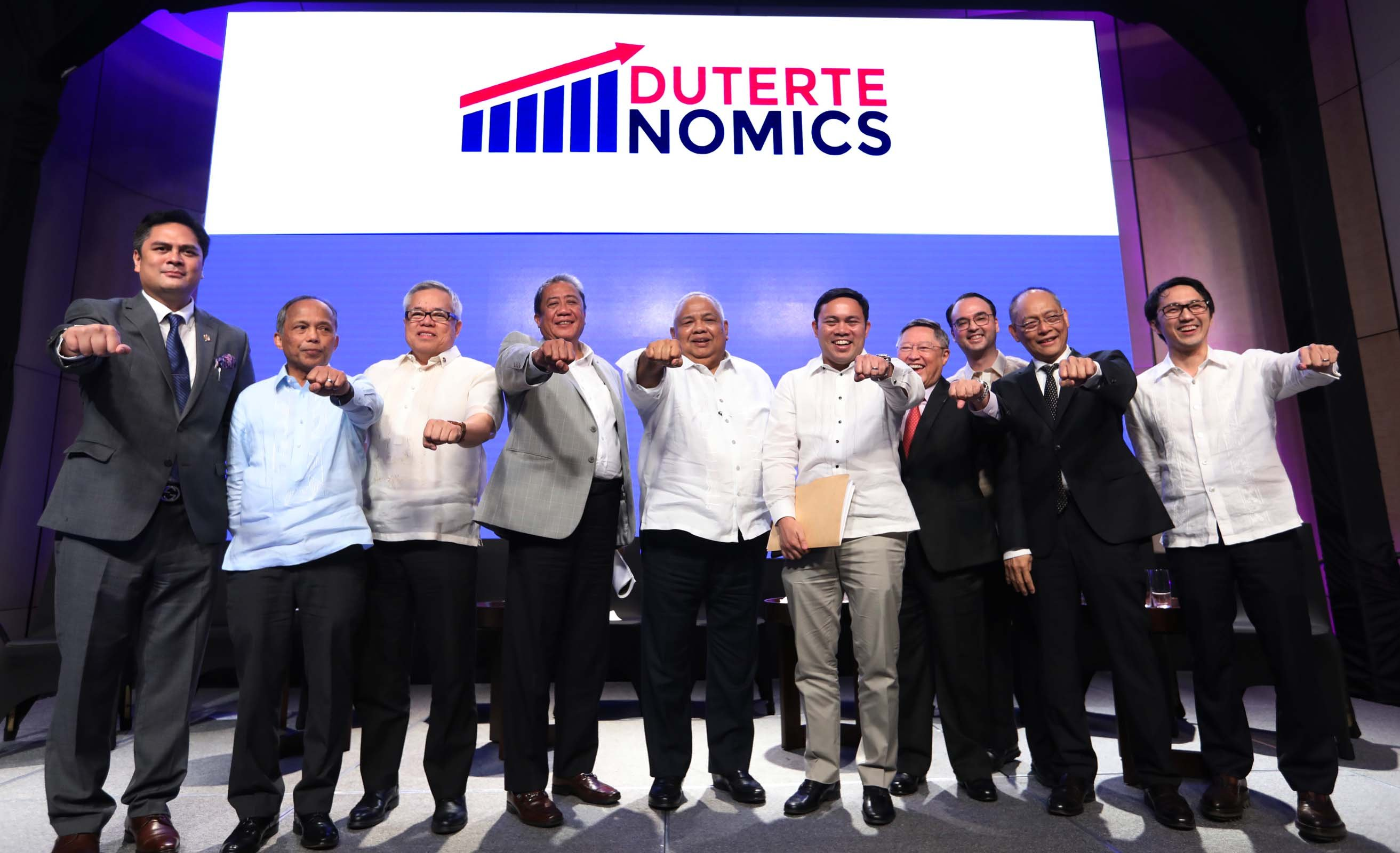
Dizon (1st from right) in 2017

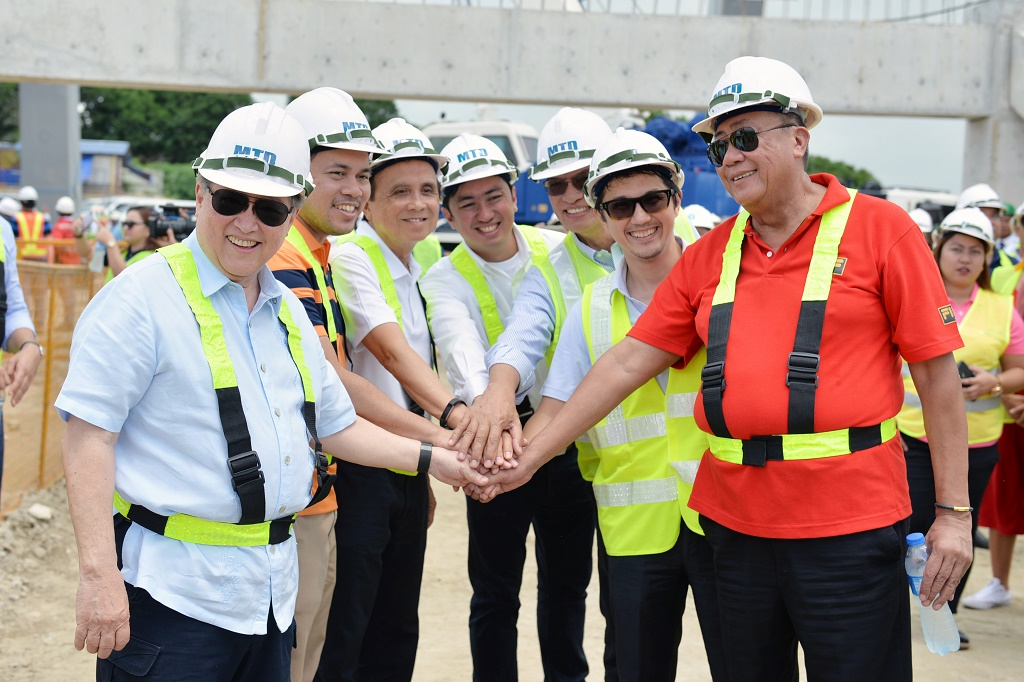
Dizon (foreground, 2nd from right) with the Build! Build! Build! team at New Clark City in 2018

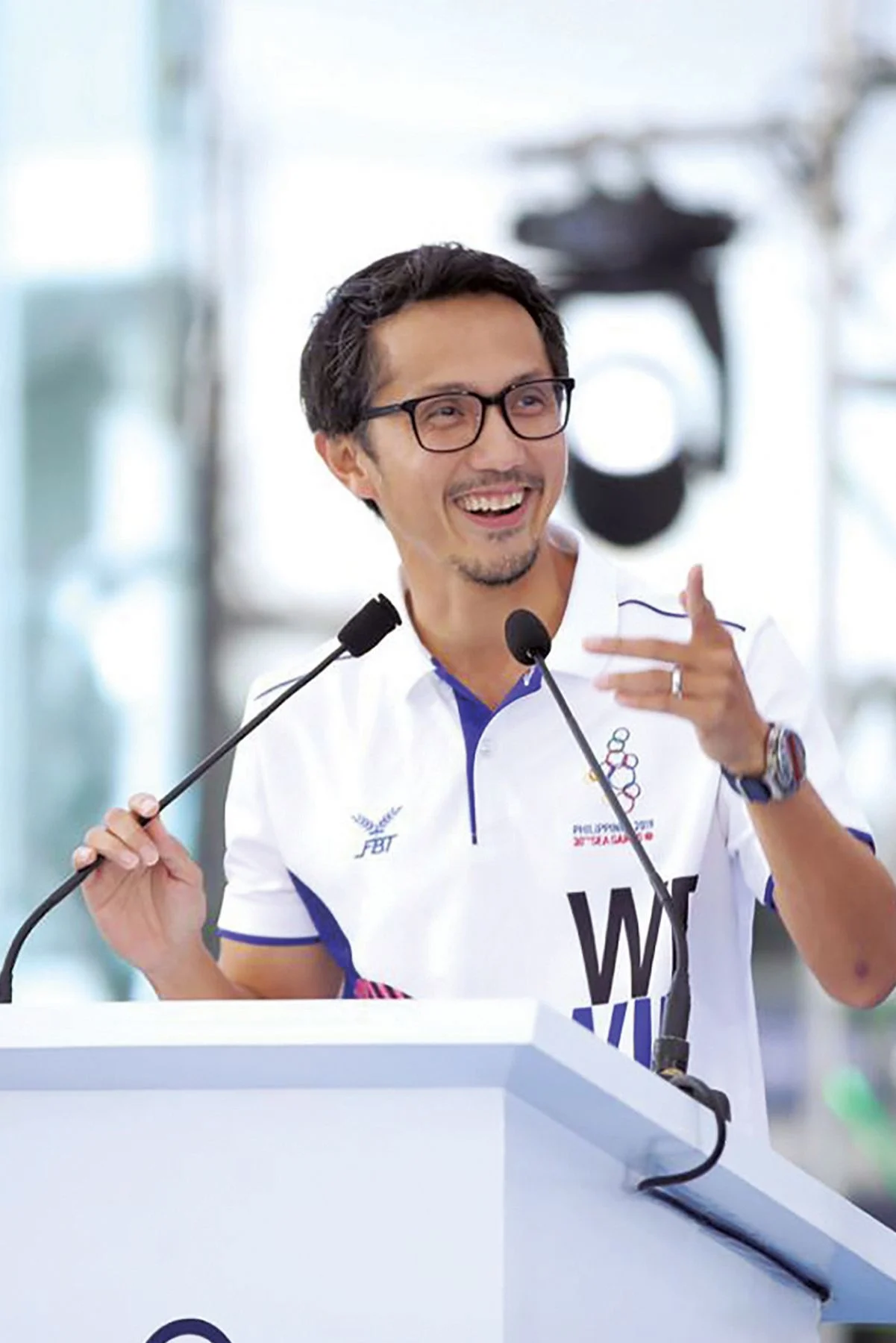
Dizon in 2019

Dizon was appointed president and CEO of the Bases Conversion and Development Authority (BCDA) in August 2016. As such, he also became the chairman of the Subic-Clark Alliance Development, vice-chairman of the Clark International Airport Corporation, BCDA representative to the Clark Development Corporation board, and member of the boards of directors of Fort Bonifacio Development Corporation, Bonifacio Estates Services Corporation and Bonifacio Global City Estates Association.

Upon his assumption of the post, Dizon, together with BCDA Chairman Gregorio Garcia III, revamped BCDA's brand statement, “We Build Great Cities While We Strengthen the Armed Forces” to emphasize the agency's mandate of providing economic opportunities to its military stakeholders while transforming former military camps into centers of growth. During Dizon's term as BCDA chief, the agency posted its highest contribution to its major stakeholder, the Armed Forces of the Philippines (AFP). BCDA remitted ₱15.16 billion to the AFP in the first three years of the Duterte administration alone, accounting for 33 percent of the total contributions made since 1993. Under Dizon, BCDA has remitted a total of ₱16.367 billion to the National Treasury.

BCDA's total assets increased by 7 percent from ₱182 billion in 2018 to ₱195 billion in 2019.

Dizon prioritized the development of Clark which was aligned with President Duterte's plan to decongest Metro Manila, the Philippines' capital region and largest metropolitan area, and develop other potential economic hubs in the regions. On November 27, 2018, BCDA inaugurated its corporate office in Clark Global City and transferred part of its operations there as part of the move to decentralize state offices in Manila. In the same month, Dizon led BCDA's launch of “Clark: It Works, Like a Dream,” a major campaign which integrates four investment districts, namely the Clark Freeport Zone, Clark Global City, Clark International Airport, and the New Clark City.

Dizon saw Clark as one of the most financially viable lands of BCDA and prioritized the expansion of Clark International Airport and the development of the Philippines’ first smart, green, sustainable and resilient metropolis, New Clark City. In October 2020, the government announced that the construction of the new Clark International Airport Passenger Terminal Building is already 100 percent completed, and will be operational by 2021.

His term also saw quick development of New Clark City Phase 1A which served as the main sports hub for the 2019 Southeast Asian Games. The BCDA also hosted other major sporting events in the new sports complex, such as the 1st Philippine National Open Swimming Championships, Philippine Athletics Track and Field Association (PATAFA) qualifiers, and the first New Clark City Triathlon.

President Duterte included Dizon as a member of the Cabinet cluster on infrastructure in July 2019, and in September the same year, he was named Presidential Adviser for Flagship Programs and Projects to oversee the monitoring and implementation of the administration's flagship infrastructure programs, and making recommendations thereto.

In November 2019, during a Senate interpellation for the Philippine Sports Commission Budget for 2020, Dizon was prominently coaching Senator Bong Go on how to answer questions raised by Senator Franklin Drilon on the future financial viability of facilities built in BDCA for the 2019 SEA Games.

In October 2020, the Citizens Crime Watch Association filed before the Office of the Ombudsman a complaint for graft and malversation against Dizon, Government Corporate Counsel Elpidio Vega, and Isaac David, the director of Malaysian firm MTD Capital Berhad – the BCDA's partner in building New Clark over the ₱11-billion facilities in New Clark City used during the 2019 SEA Games.

In December 2020, Dizon was appointed by President Duterte as the officer-in-charge chairperson of the Clark Development Corporation, a subsidiary of the BCDA that manages Clark Freeport Zone.

On October 15, 2021, Dizon filed his resignation as BCDA president.

== National Action Plan Against COVID-19 (2020–2022) ==
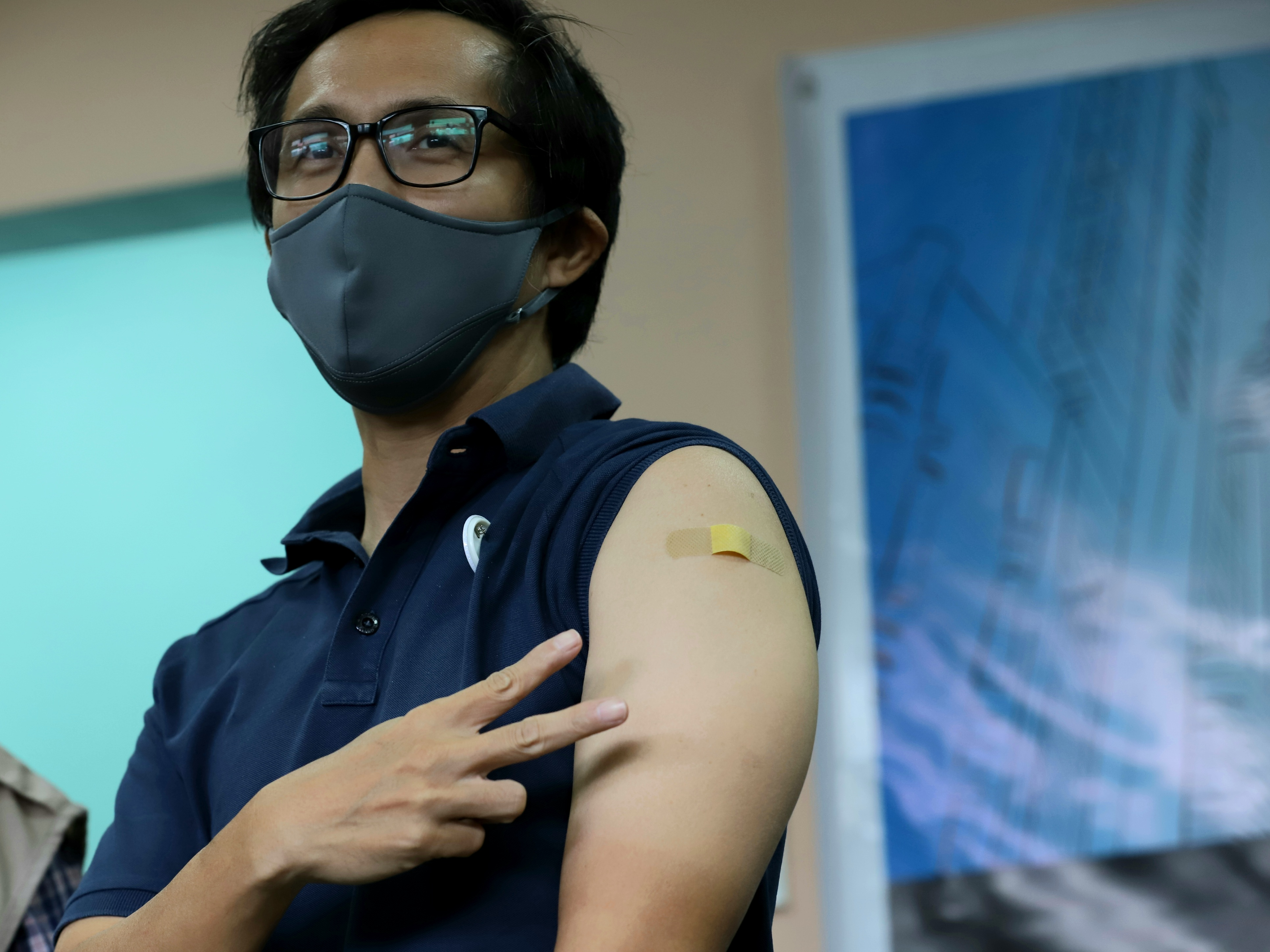
Dizon after being vaccinated with CoronaVac in 2021

During the 2020 COVID-19 pandemic and even while serving as BCDA chief, Dizon was appointed National Action Plan Against COVID-19 Deputy Chief Implementer, contributing to the government's policies in response to COVID-19 and serving as the country's Testing Czar.

As chief coordinator of the government's "Test, Trace and Treat" strategy, Dizon played an active role in improving the Philippines’ COVID-19 testing capacity. In September, Dizon reported that 3 million Filipinos have been tested, with daily testing capacity reaching 42,000. Dizon was also actively involved in the conversion of major facilities to mega quarantine centers for COVID patients.

In Clark, Dizon initiated the setting up of Task Force Clark Safe Haven to assist overseas Filipino workers (OFWs), both those stranded by the lockdown and those returning to the country.

Through Dizon and the Clark Development Corporation (CDC), Clark was able to host the Philippine Basketball Association (PBA) bubble, the first sports event in the country amid the COVID-19 pandemic.

In November 2021, Dizon took his oath of office as the new Presidential Adviser for COVID response. According to acting presidential spokesperson Karlo Nograles, his office is focused on the vaccination efforts of government.

== Secretary of Transportation (2025) ==
=== Appointment ===
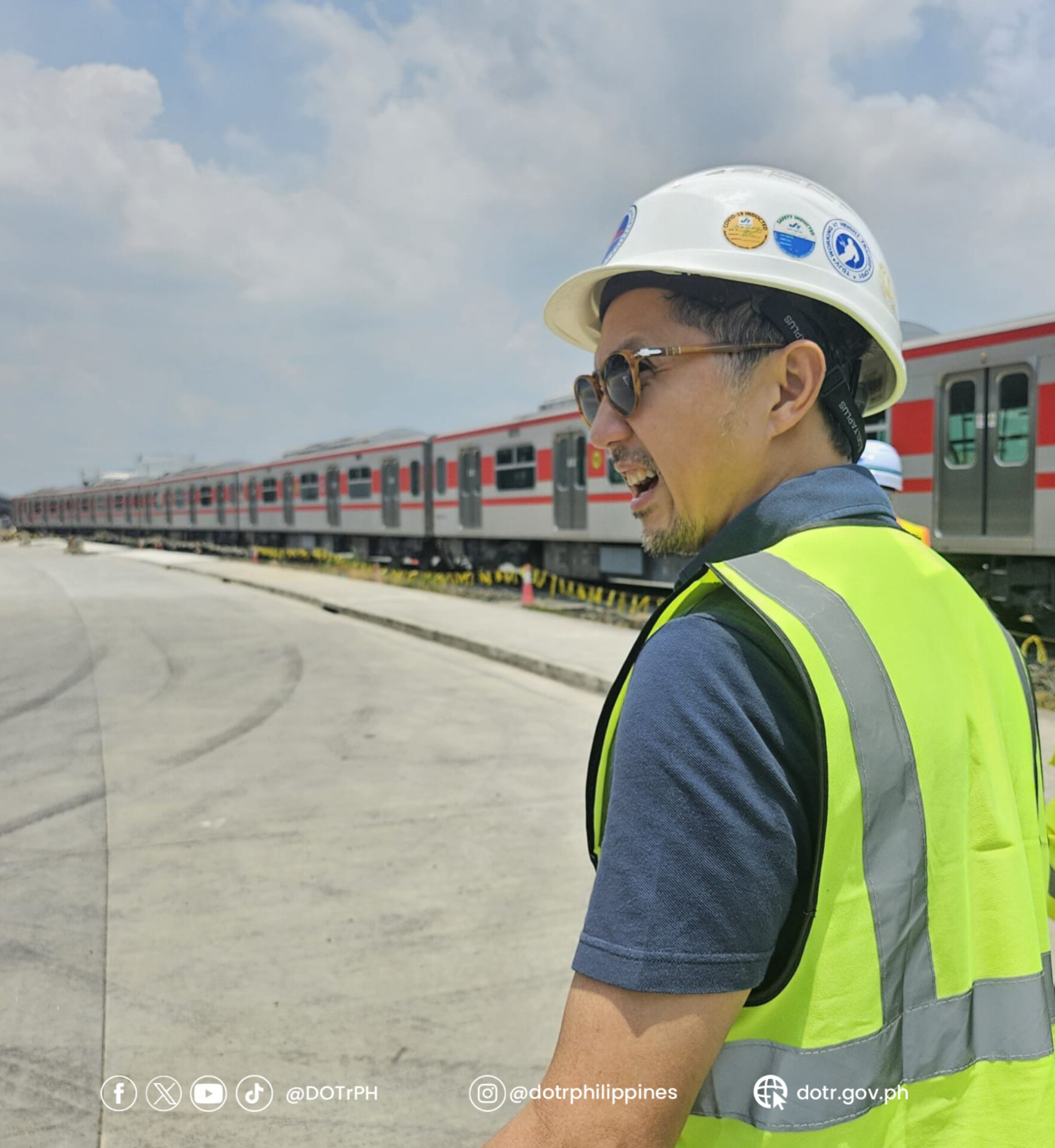
Dizon inspecting the North–South Commuter Railway in 2025

On February 13, 2025, President Bongbong Marcos appointed Dizon as Secretary of Transportation, replacing Jaime Bautista, who resigned citing health reasons. Dizon took his oath of office before President Marcos on February 21. The Commission on Appointments confirmed his appointment on June 3, 2025.

=== Tenure ===
On his first day as secretary, Dizon ordered the Toll Regulatory Board (TRB) to suspend its plan to implement a compulsory cashless payment system on toll roads, describing the proposed system as "anti-poor".

In May 2025, Dizon directed local officials in Eastern Visayas to operationalize the Amandayehan Port in Basey, Samar, within two weeks as part of emergency measures to address logistics disruptions caused by load restrictions on the San Juanico Bridge. During an inter-agency meeting and site inspection, Dizon emphasized President Marcos's instruction to ensure the continuous movement of goods, fuel, and essential supplies between the provinces of Leyte and Samar amid the declaration of states of emergency in Samar and Tacloban. He also recommended that the port's management be transferred to the Philippine Ports Authority (PPA) to enable sustained funding and development beyond the initial works supported by the Department of Public Works and Highways (DPWH).

=== Active Transportation Strategic Master Plan ===
Dizon accompanies President Bongbong Marcos and his family in viewing the Kamuning Footbridge in Quezon City, which the President later ordered to be demolished, citing its poor usability to pedestrians, June 2025

Dizon has reaffirmed his commitment to securing adequate funding for the Department of Transportation's (DOTr) Active Transportation Strategic Master Plan (ATSMP), a national framework aimed at promoting walkability and cyclist-friendly infrastructure throughout the country's urban centers. Dizon has acknowledged the deeply car-centric design of Metro Manila and other cities and stressed the urgent need to reframe transport planning to prioritize the safety and dignity of pedestrians and cyclists. He emphasized the importance of political will and pledged to fight for increased funding in the 2026 budget cycle, following a ₱90 billion (US$1.6 billion) reduction to the DOTr's approved 2025 allocation.

The ATSMP, which is in its consultation phase, is being developed in collaboration with private planning firm Palafox Associates and aims to address gaps in the country's active transport infrastructure. Public consultations are underway in six pilot cities—Iloilo, Mati, Metro Manila, Puerto Princesa, Surigao, and Zamboanga—to shape the plan's priorities and implementation strategies. However, the initiative faces significant budget constraints: for 2026, the ATSMP has been provisionally allocated only ₱69 million ($1.2 million), far below the ₱2.4 billion ($43 million) initially requested. This limited budget would allow for implementation in just one of the six target areas, significantly curbing the nationwide impact of the program and leaving the broader active transport network fragmented.

Dizon acknowledged the limitations imposed by budget constraints but stressed that he would push for restored and increased funding in the 2026 budget, instructing Road Transport Undersecretary Mark Steven Pastor to prioritize active transport in future allocations. He noted that effective use of the current budget would be essential to avoid further reductions and build a stronger case for expanded support. Under Dizon's leadership, the DOTr aimed to institutionalize active transportation planning through interagency collaboration.

Dizon also emphasized the broader societal value of active transport, linking it to health, safety, and sustainability goals. In response to critiques of disjointed planning and poor infrastructure, Dizon urged civil society groups to help gather public feedback on pedestrian facilities and design standards. He stressed that shifting road space to more efficient and inclusive modes of mobility is not only necessary but achievable with political will—a quality he committed to exercising in his role as transport chief.

=== EDSA rehabilitation ===
In May 2025, Dizon announced that rehabilitation work on EDSA, one of Metro Manila's primary thoroughfares, was scheduled to begin in mid-June, with June 13 identified as the tentative start date by the Metropolitan Manila Development Authority (MMDA). Dizon emphasized the urgency of the project, noting that EDSA had not undergone a major renovation in 45 years. To manage anticipated traffic congestion, the DOTr, under Dizon's leadership and in its capacity as chair of the TRB, planned to implement toll-free access to select segments of Skyway Stage 3 to help divert traffic. In addition, an odd-even number coding scheme was set to be enforced along EDSA, while coordination with other agencies and stakeholders continued to finalize the broader traffic management plan.

Dizon stated that the rehabilitation would prioritize not only motorists but also pedestrians and commuters, as part of a broader effort to make EDSA safer and more inclusive. Supporters of the initiative argued that safer pedestrian facilities and improved public transport access help reduce inequalities in mobility by benefiting those who rely most heavily on shared and non-motorized transportation. On May 26, 2025, Dizon joined members of the Move As One Coalition in a community walk along EDSA, where he observed firsthand the hazards faced by pedestrians, including areas with limited protection from vehicles and motorcycles. He emphasized that enhancing pedestrian safety is a central objective of the ₱8.7 billion ($156 million) EDSA rehabilitation.

The rehabilitation, the first of its scale since 1980, was to involve the phased replacement of existing road surfaces with new concrete and asphalt, alongside upgrades to pedestrian walkways and drainage systems. Dizon also confirmed that key commuter services would remain operational throughout the construction period, including the EDSA Carousel bus system, which would retain its dedicated lane, and an expanded Metro Rail Transit Line 3 (MRT-3) service with additional four-car train sets. These measures, he noted, reflect the administration's commitment to prioritizing commuter needs in the modernization of EDSA.

On June 1, 2025, President Marcos ordered the postponement of the rehabilitation to allow for a review of the project's processes.

== Acting Secretary of Public Works and Highways (2025–2026) ==
=== Appointment ===
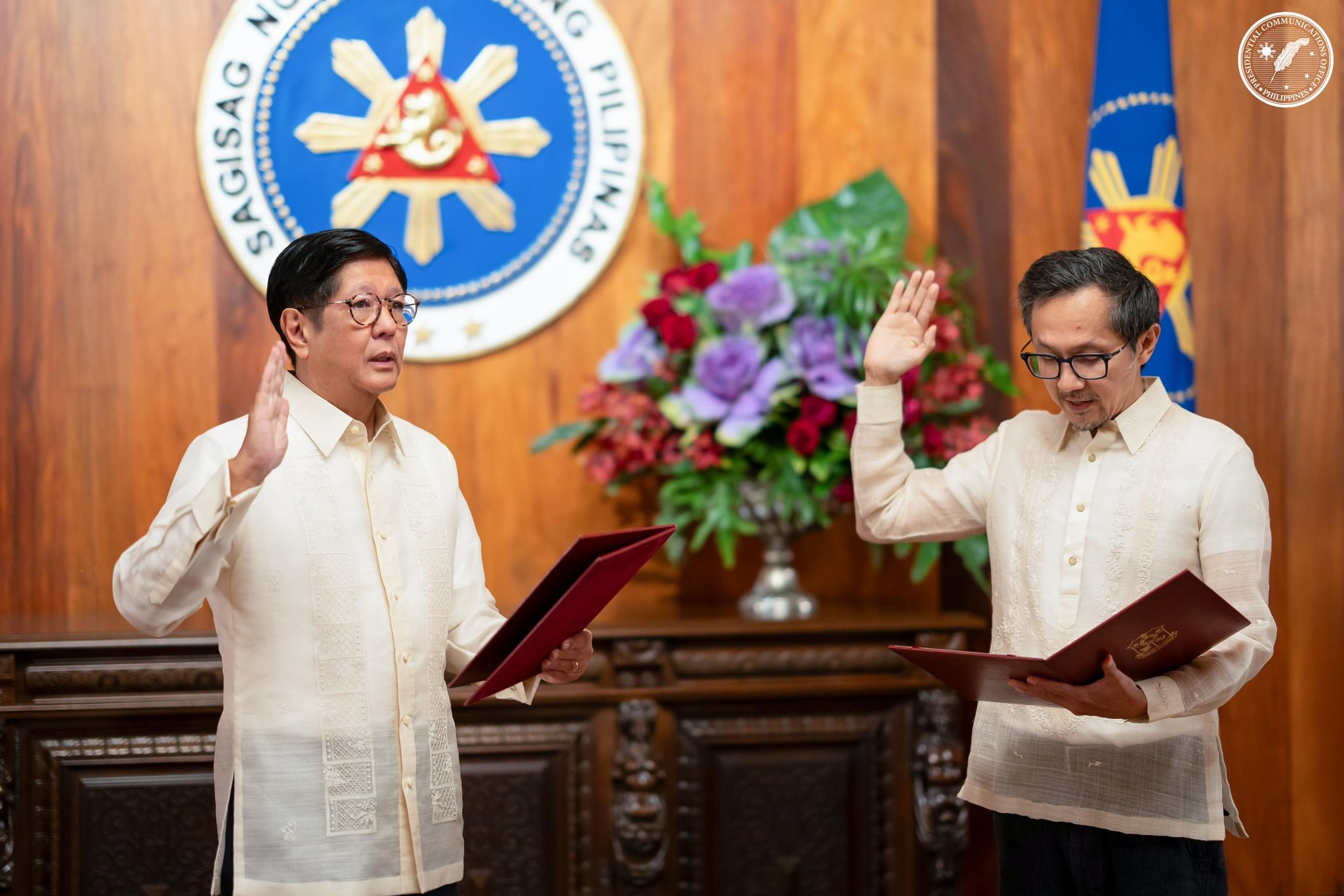
Dizon taking his oath as Secretary of Public Works and Highways before President Bongbong Marcos, September 1, 2025.

On August 31, 2025, President Bongbong Marcos appointed Dizon as the secretary of public works and highways, following the resignation of Manuel Bonoan amidst the flood control projects controversy. In turn, DOTr Finance Undersecretary Giovanni Z. Lopez was named as the Acting Secretary of Transportation. Dizon has served as secretary on an ad interim basis since September 1, 2025, as the Commission on Appointments has yet to schedule his confirmation hearing.

=== Tenure ===
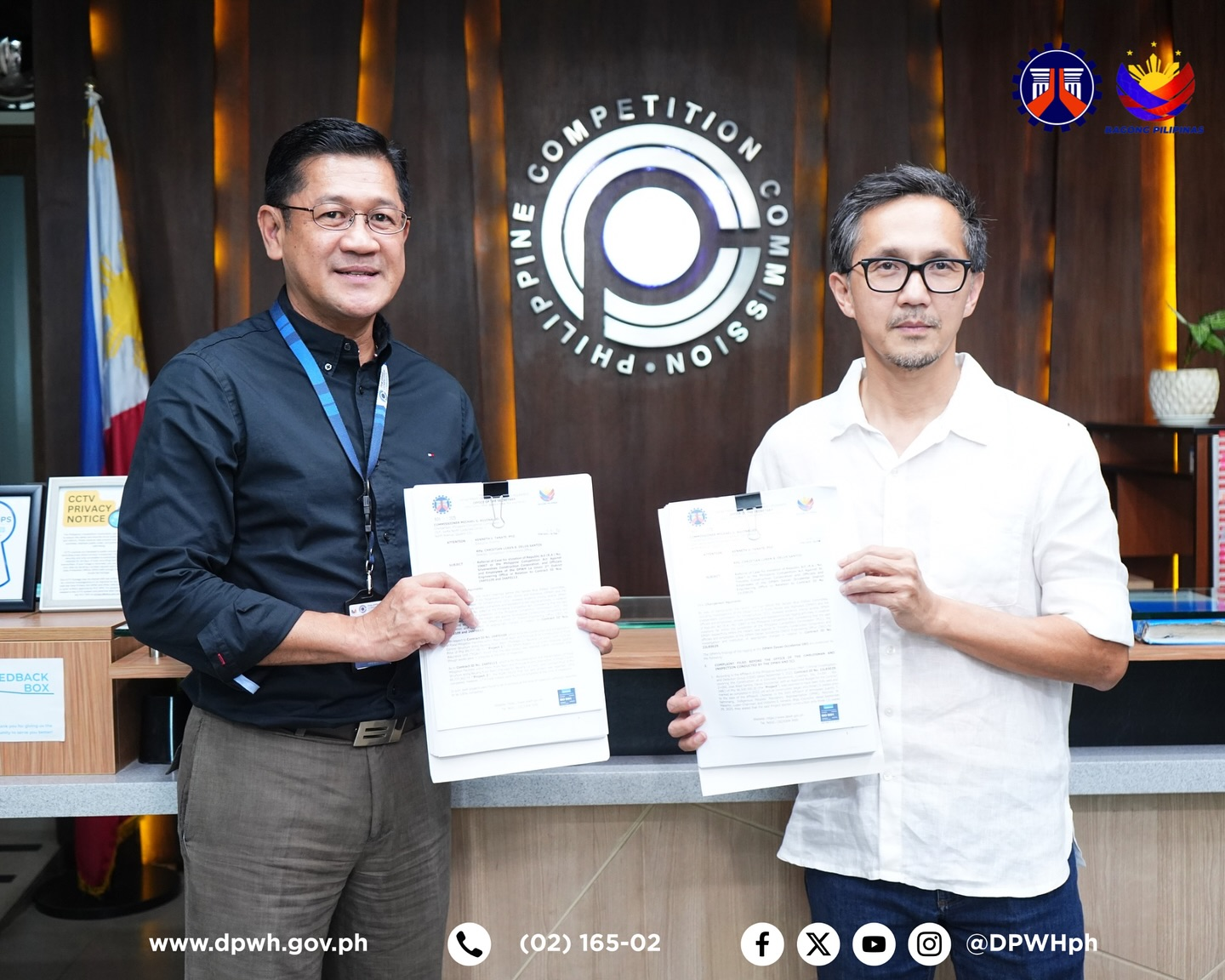
Dizon (right) filed cases against two contractors implicated on bid rigging and manipulation of three contracts in Davao Occidental and La Union, November 2025

Hours after being sworn in by President Marcos on September 1, 2025, Dizon ordered all officials of the Department of Public Works and Highways (DPWH) to submit their courtesy resignations, citing a directive from the President to cleanse the agency of "corrupt officials" following reports of anomalous flood control projects. Dizon added that he would permanently blacklist contractors involved in substandard infrastructure projects.

In an interview over DZMM on September 2, 2025, Dizon said he would dissolve the DPWH's Anti-Graft and Corrupt Practices Committee, which had been established days earlier by his predecessor Manuel Bonoan to investigate anomalies within the agency. He explained that the department should not investigate itself, and instead directed that findings on projects and accountability be turned over to the independent commission created by President Marcos. Dizon added that his focus as secretary would be on internal reforms and cleanup, with the commission tasked to determine responsibility for irregularities.

In a press briefing on September 3, 2025, Dizon announced that all bidding for locally funded DPWH projects at the national, regional, and district levels would be temporarily suspended while the agency reviews ongoing works and introduces safeguards, in line with President Marcos's directive to address alleged anomalies in flood-control programs. Dizon clarified that foreign-assisted projects would proceed, citing oversight by international funders, and said the suspension would last up to two weeks. In the same briefing, Dizon requested the Department of Justice to monitor any future international travels of officials and contractors, including former DPWH Region IV-A assistant regional director Henry Alcantara and construction owner Sarah Discaya, as investigations continued following reports that 15 out of 1,600 validated flood control projects were found to be non-existent.

Dizon inspects the asphalt overlay in the EDSA busway

On August 9, 2026, Dizon inspected EDSA after heavy monsoon rains caused asphalt deterioration on a recently repaired section in Makati. He identified standing water accumulated because concrete barriers along the busway blocked drainage flows. He also added the low point of the first phase of the roadway project as the primary accumulation site. Dizon directed the contractor to fix the damaged pavement at no expense to the state. Workers plan to install temporary drainage ducts and create openings in the barriers to prevent future water pooling.

==== Alleged illegal and ghost reclamation projects in Taguig ====
On August 30, 2026, during the investigation of illegal and ghost projects in Taguig by Senator Panfilo Lacson, Dizon stated that DPWH had already filed cease and desist orders against illegal reclamation projects at Laguna de Bay in Taguig City on August 20, under the directive of the Philippine Reclamation Authority (PRA) after claims that said projects may threaten the ecosystem and displace fisherfolk and poor communities.

However, during Senate deliberations for the proposed 2027 National Budget for DPWH on September 25, 2026, Dizon told Senate Minority Leader Alan Peter Cayetano that there were no ghost projects in Taguig. Undersecretary Ricardo Bernabe III stated further that all 107 projects in Taguig have recorded accomplishments.

On September 28, 2026, Lacson replied to Dizon's statement by citing a project in which the contractor in question is St. Timothy Construction, which is tied to the Discayas. The project's geolocation is tagged to Leyte, approximately 600km away from Taguig. He also commented on the contradictory statements between DPWH site inspection engineers and Dizon and asked the latter to explain himself.

On September 29, 2026, Cayetano fired back at Dizon after the latter retracted his statement regarding ghost projects in Taguig, claiming that the whole investigation was a political move against him.

==== Overdue tenure as acting secretary ====
During Senate deliberations for the proposed 2027 National Budget for DPWH on September 25, 2026, Senator Imee Marcos questioned Dizon's legal basis as Secretary of Public Works and Highways without confirmation from the Commission on Appointments, stating that according to the 1987 Administrative Code, his one year limit as acting secretary has ended since September 1, 2026. Dizon replied by stating that his appointment will continue until the 2nd session of the 20th Congress is in recess and that he will have to consult the Office of the President for the matter as he was not given any reappointment letters. Marcos insists that he was supposed to vacate his post on September 1 and questioned his legal basis for attending the budget hearing.

On September 30, 2026, President Bongbong Marcos extended Dizon's term as the Acting Secretary of Public Works and Highways, along with Giovanni Lopez as the then-Acting Secretary of Transportation, although both appointed positions still have to be confirmed by the Commission on Appointments.

== Acting Secretary of Transportation (2026–) ==
=== Appointment ===
Dizon turns over to Lopez several DPWH documents of corrupt officials linked to irregularities, October 27, 2026

On October 26, 2026, President Bongbong Marcos reappointed Dizon as the Acting Secretary of Transportation, switching with outgoing Acting Transportation Secretary Giovanni Z. Lopez who is reappointed as the Acting Secretary of Public Works and Highways. The decision was made in order to "accelerate reform" in both DOTr and DPWH.

On October 27, 2026, Dizon turned over several documents of corrupt DPWH personnel linked to irregularities to Lopez, formalizing the exchange of the two posts.

=== Tenure ===
On October 28, 2026, after inspecting three bus terminals in Sampaloc, Manila, Dizon issued a show-cause order on two bus companies, namely Ohayami Trans and Victory Liner Inc. for the lack of proper passenger facilities in their bus terminals, with a possible suspension for non-compliance after All Saint's Day. In response, Operations Manager Brix Macalinao of Victory Liner said that they will comply with the secretary's requests.

On October 30, 2026, during his inspection of NAIA Terminal 1 and Terminal 2, Dizon reprimanded some Manila International Airport Authority (MIAA) officials for failing to turn over CCTV operations to New NAIA Infrastructure Corp. (NNIC) after a robbery incident occurred in Terminal 1 wherein the footage cannot be found. He gave MIAA until November 2026 to fully turn over CCTV operations to NNIC, in which MIAA promises to do so. MIAA finally turned over all CCTV operations to NNIC on November 6, 2026.

== Personal life ==
Dizon is married to Christine Marie Romero and they have one daughter.

== Awards and recognitions ==
Dizon received one of the highest civilian honors—the Order of Lakandula with the rank of Bayani—for his contributions to Duterte's Build, Build, Build infrastructure program and the country's response to the COVID-19 pandemic.

Dizon was named one of People Asia's People of the Year in 2019 for his role in the Philippine economic team and his active role in the implementation of Build, Build, Build.

He is also an Asia CEO Awards 2019 Circle of Excellence Awardee and was featured by Pampanga-based newspaper Punto! as "2018 Man of the Year" for the projects he spearheaded in Clark.

== Honors ==
=== National honors ===
- Grand Cross of the Order of Lakandula with Rank of Bayani (2022)

Business positions
Preceded by Arnel Paciano Casanova	President & CEO of the Bases Conversion and Development Authority; 2016–2021	Succeeded by Aristotle Batuhan
Political offices
New title	Presidential Adviser for Flagship Programs and Projects; 2019–2022	Position abolished
New title	Deputy Chief Implementer of the National Task Force Against COVID-19; 2020–2022	Position abolished
New title	IATF-EID Testing Czar; 2020–2022	Position abolished
New title	Presidential Adviser for COVID-19 Response; 2021–2022	Position abolished
Preceded by Jaime Bautista	Secretary of Transportation; 2025	Succeeded by Giovanni Lopez as Acting Secretary of Transportation
Preceded by Manuel Bonoan	Secretary of Public Works and Highways; 2025–2026	Succeeded by Giovanni Z. Lopez
Preceded by Giovanni Z. Lopez	Secretary of Transportation; 2026–present	Incumbent
Order of precedence
Preceded by Dita Angara-Mathay as Secretary of Tourism (Ad interim)	Order of Precedence of the Philippines as Secretary of Transportation	Succeeded by Renato Solidum Jr. as Secretary of Science and Technology
