= Giovanni Z. Lopez =

Filipino government official (born 1980)

Giovanni Z. Lopez CPA, LLB

Secretary of Public Works and Highways
- Incumbent
- Assumed office October 26, 2026
- President: Bongbong Marcos
- Preceded by: Vince Dizon (Acting)

Secretary of Transportation
- Acting
- In office September 1, 2025 – October 26, 2026
- President: Bongbong Marcos
- Preceded by: Vince Dizon
- Succeeded by: Vince Dizon

Personal details
- Born: April 5, 1980 (age 46) Tuguegarao, Cagayan, Philippines
- Education: St. Paul University Philippines (B.S.); San Beda College of Law (LL.B)
- Profession: Lawyer; Certified Public Accountant

Giovanni Zinampan Lopez (born April 5, 1980), also known as Banoy Lopez, is a Filipino lawyer, certified public accountant, and government official who has served as the Secretary of Public Works and Highways since 2026. A longtime aide of former transportation secretary Arthur Tugade, Lopez has served in various senior roles within the Department of Transportation (DOTr).

== Early life and education ==
Lopez is a native of Tuguegarao, Cagayan. He finished high school at University of Saint Louis Tuguegarao in 1996. He also finished BS Accountancy cum laude from St. Paul University Philippines in 2000 and later studied law at San Beda College of Law in 2001.

== Early career ==
In 2007, he founded a law firm in Santa Cruz, Manila named the DVL Law Firm.

== Career in the Department of Transportation (2020–2025) ==
Lopez began his career in the DOTr as Director for Legal Service, later serving as Assistant Secretary for Procurement and Project Implementation, where he oversaw projects in rail, aviation, and maritime transport. He also worked as Chief of Staff to Secretary Arthur Tugade between 2020 and 2022.

During the COVID-19 pandemic, Lopez played a role in the DOTr’s logistical response, including the deployment of a Ford Transit ambulance for quarantine facilities. He also explained the department’s “OPLAN AIR” program in 2021, which sought to improve public transportation through fleet expansion, new routes, and electronic ticketing.

=== Undersecretary for Administration, Finance, and Procurement (2025) ===
In February 2025, he was appointed Undersecretary for Administration, Finance, and Procurement by President Bongbong Marcos, under then-Secretary Vince Dizon.

== Acting Secretary of Transportation (2025–2026) ==
=== Appointment ===
On September 1, 2025, Lopez became the acting secretary of transportation following the reassignment of Secretary Vince Dizon to the Department of Public Works and Highways. His oath of office was administered by President Marcos Jr.

=== Tenure ===
On September 15, 2025, Lopez issued a memorandum requiring all senior road and rail sector officials of the Department of Transportation, including those from the Land Transportation Office, Land Transportation Franchising and Regulatory Board, Light Rail Transit Authority, Philippine National Railways, and DOTr-MRT3 to use public transportation (jeepneys, buses, and trains) at least once a week starting September 17, 2025. The memorandum also requires the mentioned officials to accomplish a weekly report of their observations, recommendations, and plans of actions, which will be tackled during executive meetings.

On September 30, 2026, President Bongbong Marcos extended Lopez's term as the Acting Secretary of Transportation, along with Vince Dizon as then-Acting Secretary of Public Works and Highways, although both roles have yet to be confirmed by the Commission on Appointments.

== Secretary of Public Works and Highways (2026–) ==
=== Appointment ===
On October 26, 2026, President Bongbong Marcos reappointed Lopez as Acting Secretary of Public Works and Highways (then confirmed as full time Secretary), exchanging roles with outgoing Acting Public Works Secretary Vince Dizon, who returned to DOTr as the Secretary of Transportation (formerly in ad interim capacity). This was done in order to "speed up reform" in both DOTr and DPWH.

=== Tenure ===
During his first few days, he overseed the repairs of the C-5 Pasig Boulevard and Bonny Serrano flyovers, which were completed ahead of schedule.

On November 3, 2026, during his joint inspection with Transportation Secretary Vince Dizon, Lopez announced that a 23 kilometer stretch of Circumferential Road 5 (C-5) from Kalayaan Interchange in Taguig to Capitol Hills Drive in Quezon City will undergo a rehabilitation project starting the last week of November. The project implementation will be similar to the EDSA rehabilitation in order to minimize disruption along C-5.

== See also ==
- Department of Transportation (Philippines)
- Secretary of Transportation (Philippines)
- Arthur Tugade
- Vince Dizon

Political offices
Preceded by Vince Dizon	Acting Secretary of Transportation; 2025–2026	Succeeded by Vince Dizon
Preceded by Vince Dizon	Acting Secretary of Public Works and Highways; 2026–present	Incumbent
Order of precedence
Preceded by Francisco Tiu Laurel Jr. as Secretary of Agriculture	Order of Precedence of the Philippines as Secretary of Public Works and Highways	Succeeded by Sonny Angara as Secretary of Education
