= Rogelio Singson =

Filipino politician

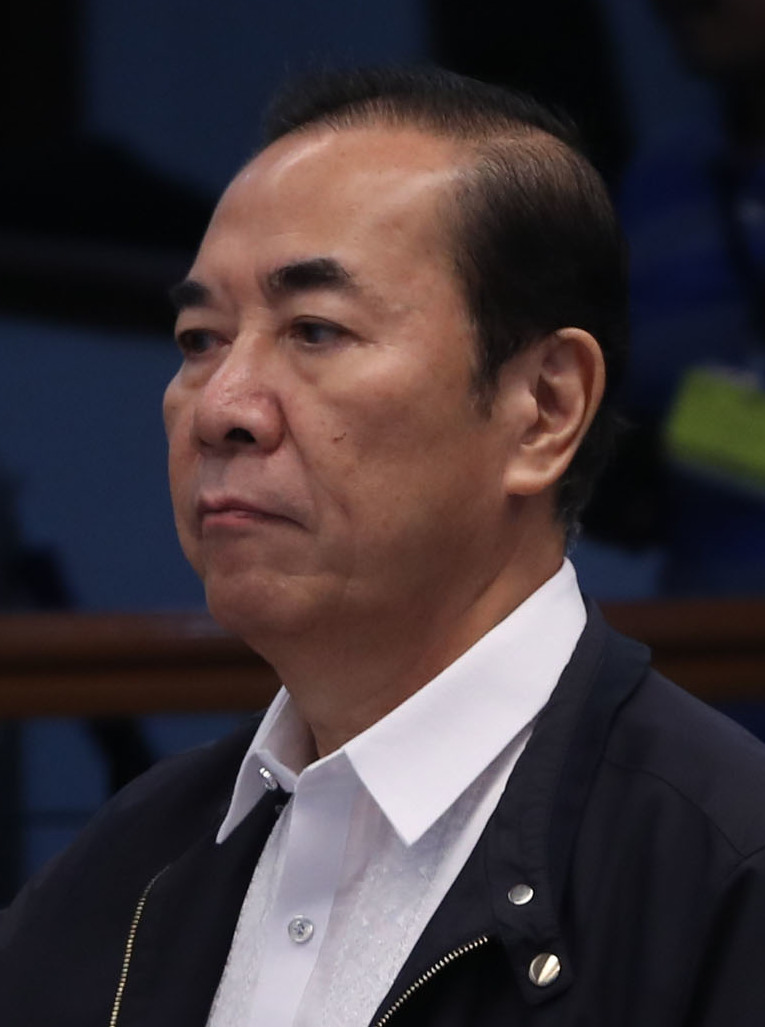
- Singson in 2018

Member of the Independent Commission for Infrastructure
- In office September 15, 2025 – December 15, 2025
- President: Ferdinand R. Marcos Jr.
- Succeeded by: Maoui David (acting)

Secretary of Public Works and Highways
- In office June 30, 2010 – June 30, 2016
- President: Benigno Aquino III
- Preceded by: Victor Domingo
- Succeeded by: Rafael Yabut (acting)

Personal details
- Born: September 16, 1948 (age 78) Vigan, Ilocos Sur, Philippines
- Spouse: Isabel Singson
- Education: University of the Philippines Diliman
- Occupation: Industrial engineer, businessman, public servant
- Profession: Industrial engineer

Rogelio Lazo Singson (born September 16, 1948) is a Filipino industrial engineer, businessman, and public servant. He served as Secretary of Public Works and Highways under President Benigno Aquino III from 2010 to 2016.

== Career ==
Before joining the Cabinet of President Aquino, Singson held several roles in both the public and private sectors. He was Senior Vice President for Business Development, Citadel Holdings, Inc. from July 2002 to May 2007; and Chairman and President of Bases Conversion and Development Authority (BCDA) from 1998 to 2002. He also held concurrent positions at affiliated including John Hay Poro Point Development Corporation, BCDA Management Holdings Inc., and North Luzon Railways Corporation.

As Senior Vice President for Project Development of Citadel Holdings, Inc., he was involved in business development activities, including participation in bids for the electricity transmission company Transco and involvement in a telecommunications project in Micronesia.

As head of BCDA, he was involved in projects focused on the conversion of former military bases - Clark, Subic, John Hay, Poro Point, Fort Bonifacio (Bonifacio Global City) and Villamor - from military to commercial and industrial use as special economic and freeport zones. He promoted the Subic Clark Alliance Development (SCAD) Project and worked on funding arrangements, including a JBIC loan for the Subic Clark Tarlac Toll Road. He was also involved in the bidding process for developments in Fort Bonifacio and in agreements with several international schools.

He also served as Director of Metro Pacific Investments Corporation, Clark Development Corporation, Clark International Airport Corporation, Fort Bonifacio Development Corporation; and board member at Subic Bay Metropolitan Authority, National Power Corporation, and Metropolitan Waterworks & Sewerage System.

In September 2025, he was appointed by President Bongbong Marcos as a member of the Independent Commission for Infrastructure, tasked with investigating irregularities in infrastructure projects. He resigned from the commission in December, citing stress and age-related issues He was Succeeded by Maoui David and Later Abolished.

== Background ==
Before being appointed by Benigno Aquino III to the Public Works and Highways secretary post, Singson was President and Chief Executive Officer of Maynilad from July 1, 2007 to June 30, 2010.

== Personal life ==
Singson is a member of Ang Ligaya ng Panginoon, a Catholic charismatic community affiliated with the Sword of the Spirit movement.

Political offices
Preceded by Victor F. Domingo	Secretary of Public Works and Highways; 2010 – 2016	Succeeded by Rafael Yabut; Acting
