= Secretary of Public Works and Highways =

Head of Filipino government department

- Kalihim ng mga Pagawain at Lansangang Bayan
- Official seal of the Department of Public Works and Highways

- Incumbent; Giovanni Z. Lopez (Ad Interim) since October 26, 2026
- Style: The Honorable
- Member of: Cabinet
- Appointer: The president with the consent of the Commission on Appointments
- Term length: No fixed term
- Inaugural holder: Baldomero Aguinaldo
- Formation: January 21, 1899 (127 years ago)
- Website: www.dpwh.gov.ph

The secretary of public works and highways (Filipino: Kalihim ng mga Pagawain at Lansangang Bayan) is the head of the Department of Public Works and Highways in the national government of the Philippines, and is a member of the president's Cabinet.

The current secretary is Giovanni Z. Lopez who assumed the post on October 26, 2026, on an ad interim basis as he has yet to be confirmed by the Commission on Appointments.

== List of secretaries of public works and highways ==
=== Secretary of Public Works and Communications (1899) ===
Portrait	Name (Birth–Death)	Took office	Left office	President
	Maximino Paterno	May 7, 1899	November 13, 1899	Emilio Aguinaldo

=== Secretary of Public Works and Communications (1933–1935) ===
Portrait	Name (Birth–Death)	Took office	Left office	Governor-General
	Filemon Perez	January 1, 1933	January 2, 1933	Theodore Roosevelt Jr.
	Antonio de las Alas (1889–1983)	January 26, 1933	November 15, 1935	Theodore Roosevelt Jr.
	Antonio de las Alas (1889–1983)	January 26, 1933	November 15, 1935	Frank Murphy

=== Secretary of Public Works and Communications (1935–1941) ===
Portrait	Name (Birth–Death)	Took office	Left office	President
	Antonio de las Alas (1889–1983)	November 15, 1935	February 18, 1936	Manuel L. Quezon
	Mariano Jesús Cuenco (1888–1964)	1936	1939	Manuel L. Quezon
	José Avelino (1890–1986)	1939	1941	Manuel L. Quezon
	Sotero Baluyut (1889–1975)	1941	1941	Manuel L. Quezon

=== Secretary of National Defense, Public Works, Communications and Labor (1941–1944) ===
Portrait	Name (Birth–Death)	Took office	Left office	President
	Basilio Valdes (1892–1970)	December 24, 1941	August 1, 1944	Manuel L. Quezon

=== Commissioner of Public Works and Communications (1942–1943) ===
Portrait	Name (Birth–Death)	Took office	Left office	Chairman of the Philippine Executive Commission
	Quintín Paredes (1884–1973)	January 26, 1942	October 14, 1943	Jorge B. Vargas

=== Minister of Public Works and Communications (1942–1943) ===
Portrait	Name (Birth–Death)	Took office	Left office	President
	Quintín Paredes (1884–1973)	October 19, 1943	August 24, 1944	Jose P. Laurel
	Jose Paez	August 24, 1944	1945	Jose P. Laurel

=== Secretary of Public Works and Communications (1945–1951) ===
Portrait	Name (Birth–Death)	Took office	Left office	President
	Sotero Cabahug (1891–1963)	March 8, 1945	May 28, 1946	Sergio Osmeña
	Ricardo Nepomuceno	May 28, 1946	1949	Manuel Roxas
	Ricardo Nepomuceno	May 28, 1946	1949	Elpidio Quirino
	Prospero Sanidad (1897–1969)	June 29, 1949	1951	Elpidio Quirino

=== Secretary of Public Works, Transportation and Communications (1951–1978) ===
Portrait	Name (Birth–Death)	Took office	Left office	President
	Sotero Baluyut (1889–1975)	January 6, 1951	1952	Elpidio Quirino
	Pablo Lorenzo	May 6, 1952	1953	Elpidio Quirino
	Vicente Ylagan Orosa Sr.	March 10, 1954	1955	Ramon Magsaysay
	Florencio Moreno	April 30, 1955	December 30, 1961	Ramon Magsaysay
	Florencio Moreno	April 30, 1955	December 30, 1961	Carlos P. Garcia
	Marciano Bautista	1961	1962	Diosdado Macapagal
	Paulino T. Cases	1962	May 21, 1962	Diosdado Macapagal
	Brigido R. Valencia	May 21, 1962	1963	Diosdado Macapagal
	Jorge Abad	1963	1965	Diosdado Macapagal
	Antonio Raquiza (1908–1999)	August 24, 1966	1968	Ferdinand Marcos
	Rene Espina (1929–2019)	November 1968	September 1969	Ferdinand Marcos
	Manuel Syquio	September 1969	1970	Ferdinand Marcos
	David Consunji (1921–2017)	1970	1975	Ferdinand Marcos
	Alfredo Juinio (1918–2003)	1975	1978	Ferdinand Marcos

=== Secretary of Public Highways (1974–1978) ===
Portrait	Name (Birth–Death)	Took office	Left office	President
	Baltazar Aquino	1974	1978	Ferdinand Marcos

=== Minister of Public Works, Transportation and Communications (1978–1981) ===
Portrait	Name (Birth–Death)	Took office	Left office	President
	Alfredo Juinio (1918–2003)	1974	1981	Ferdinand Marcos

=== Minister of Public Highways (1978–1981) ===
Portrait	Name (Birth–Death)	Took office	Left office	President
	Baltazar Aquino	1978	1979	Ferdinand Marcos
	Vicente Paterno (1925–2014)	1979	1980	Ferdinand Marcos
	Jesus Hipolito	1980	1981	Ferdinand Marcos

=== Minister of Public Works and Highways (1981–1987) ===
Portrait	Name (Birth–Death)	Took office	Left office	President
	Jesus Hipolito	1981	1986	Ferdinand Marcos
	Rogaciano Mercado	February 25, 1986	November 20, 1986	Corazon Aquino
	Vicente Jayme	December 2, 1986	February 11, 1987	Corazon Aquino

=== Secretary of Public Works and Highways (since 1987) ===
Portrait	Name (Birth–Death)	Took office	Left office	President
	Vicente Jayme	February 11, 1987	September 1, 1987	Corazon Aquino
	Fiorello Estuar	September 21, 1987	October 26, 1987	Corazon Aquino
	Juanito Ferrer	October 27, 1987	November 4, 1988	Corazon Aquino
	Fiorello Estuar	November 5, 1988	December 31, 1990	Corazon Aquino
	Jose de Jesus	January 4, 1991	March 1, 1993	Corazon Aquino
	Jose de Jesus	January 4, 1991	March 1, 1993	Fidel V. Ramos
	Eduardo Mir; Acting	March 1, 1993	June 1, 1993	Fidel V. Ramos
	Gregorio Vigilar	June 1, 1993	January 20, 2001	Fidel V. Ramos
	Gregorio Vigilar	June 1, 1993	January 20, 2001	Joseph Estrada
	Simeon Datumanong (1935–2017)	January 20, 2001	January 15, 2003	Gloria Macapagal Arroyo
	Bayani Fernando (1946–2023)	January 15, 2003	April 15, 2003	Gloria Macapagal Arroyo
	Florante Soriquez; Acting	April 15, 2003	February 15, 2005	Gloria Macapagal Arroyo
	Jun Ebdane (born 1948)	February 15, 2005	February 1, 2007	Gloria Macapagal Arroyo
	Manuel Bonoan (born 1945); Acting	February 5, 2007	July 3, 2007	Gloria Macapagal Arroyo
	Jun Ebdane (born 1948)	July 4, 2007	October 22, 2009	Gloria Macapagal Arroyo
	Victor Domingo	October 22, 2009	June 30, 2010	Gloria Macapagal Arroyo
	Rogelio Singson (born 1948)	June 30, 2010	June 30, 2016	Benigno Aquino III
	Rafael Yabut (born 1953); Acting	June 30, 2016	July 31, 2016	Rodrigo Duterte
	Mark Villar (born 1978)	August 1, 2016	October 6, 2021	Rodrigo Duterte
	Roger Mercado (born 1951); Acting	October 13, 2021	June 30, 2022	Rodrigo Duterte
	Manuel Bonoan (born 1945)	June 30, 2022	August 31, 2025	Bongbong Marcos
	Vince Dizon (born 1974); Acting	September 1, 2025	October 26, 2026	Bongbong Marcos
	Giovanni Z. Lopez (born 1980); Interim	October 26, 2026	Incumbent	Bongbong Marcos
