= David Consunji =

Filipino businessman (1921–2017)

Secretary of Public Works, Transportation and Communications
- In office 1970–1975
- President: Ferdinand Marcos
- Preceded by: Antonio Syquio
- Succeeded by: Alfredo Juinio

Personal details
- Born: David Mendoza Consunji; November 2, 1921 Samal, Bataan, Philippine Islands
- Died: September 4, 2017 (aged 95) Manila, Philippines
- Spouse: Fredesvinda Almeda
- Education: University of the Philippines
- Occupation: Chairman of the Board (DMCI)
- Profession: Businessman, entrepreneur
- Known for: Founder of DMCI
- Website: www.dmcinet.com/dmci.asp

David Mendoza Consunji (November 2, 1921 – September 4, 2017) was a Chinese-Filipino businessman and the chairman of a publicly listed holding firm, DMCI Holdings, Incorporated (PSE: DMC). He was a former secretary of the Department of Public Works, Transportation and Communications from 1970 to 1975, during the Marcos administration. In 2014, Forbes listed him as the 6th richest Filipino, with a net worth of US$3.9 billion.

== Early life and education ==
Consunji was born on November 2, 1921, in Samal, Bataan to Gaudencio Tongco Consunji of Samal and Consuelo Mendoza of Pandacan, Manila. He is the third eldest among at least nine children.

Consunji enrolled at University of the Philippines in 1939 and took up civil engineering and graduated in 1946 and passed the board during the same year.

== Career ==
After graduation, Consunji worked as teacher in Bataan and later a concrete inspector for Kuenzle and Streiff. He founded D.M. Consunji, Incorporated in 1954 and became its chairman since.

In 1995, he established DMCI Holdings, Incorporated, to consolidate his businesses.

Consunji also served as the president of the Philippine Contractors Association, the International Federation of Asian & Western Pacific Contractors' Association and the Philippine Institute of Civil Engineers. In addition, he was also vice-president of the Confederation of International Contractors' Association. Aside from these organizations, he was also the chairman of the Contractors Association, the Philippine Domestic Construction Board and the U. P. Engineering Research and Development Foundation.

== Death ==
Consuji's death was announced on September 4, 2017. He was 95. His cause of death was not disclosed.

Consunji wrote his autobiography, A Passion to Build: A Memoir of David M. Consunji. His son Isidro Consunji is currently the president & chairman of DMCI Holdings, Incorporated. One of his grandchildren, Victor Consunji is married to 2007 Bb. Pilipinas World Maggie Wilson in December 2010.

== Personal life ==
Consunji was married to Fredesvinda Almeda with whom he had eight children.
