= Arthur Tugade =

Filipino businessman and lawyer

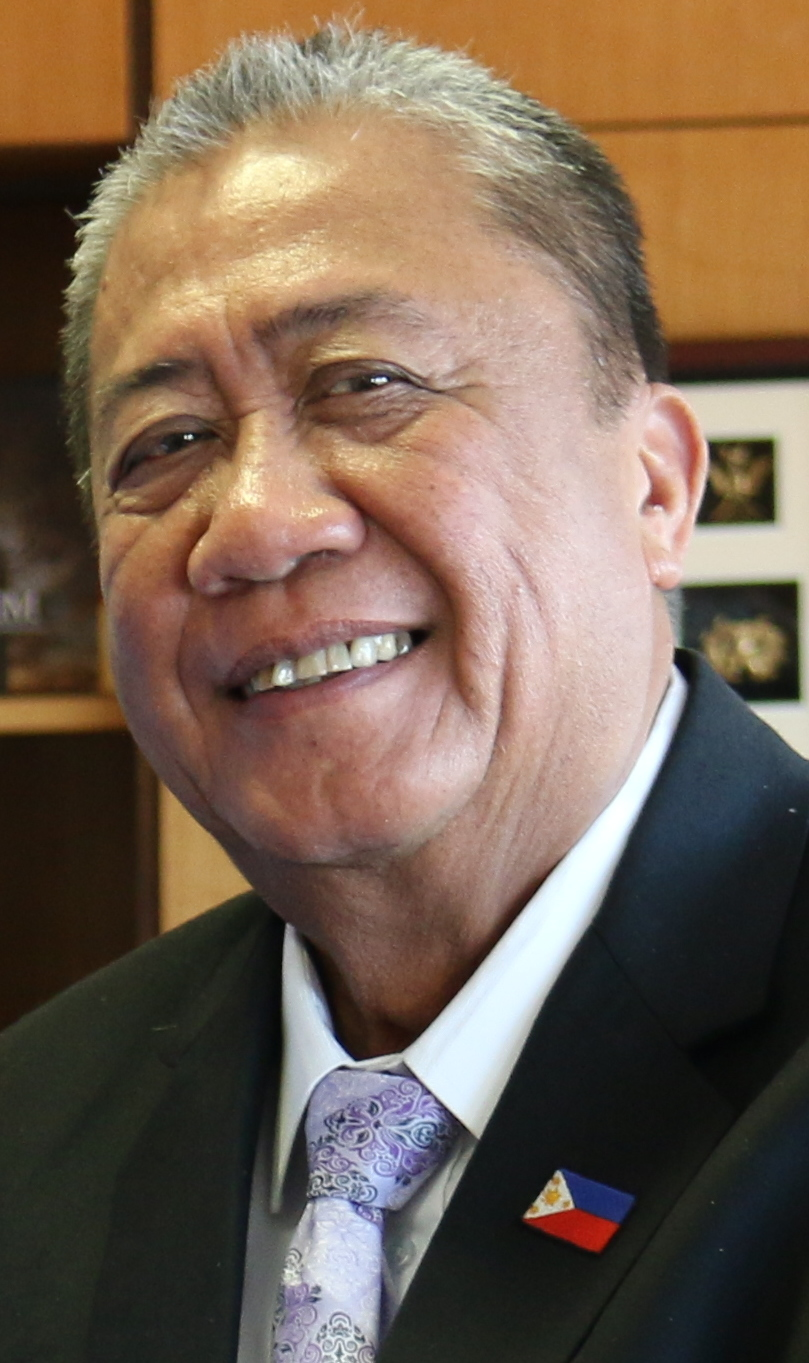
- Tugade in 2018

Secretary of Transportation
- In office June 30, 2016 – June 30, 2022
- President: Rodrigo Duterte
- Preceded by: Joseph Emilio Abaya (as Secretary of Transportation and Communications)
- Succeeded by: Jaime Bautista

Personal details
- Born: Arthur Planta Tugade; January 9, 1946 (age 80) Claveria, Cagayan, Philippines
- Spouse: Maria Soledad Maddela Tugade
- Children: 5
- Education: San Beda College (BA, LL.B)
- Occupation: Businessman
- Profession: Lawyer

Military service
- Allegiance: Philippines
- Branch/service: Philippine Air Force Reserve Command
- Rank: Colonel

Arthur "Art" Planta Tugade (born January 9, 1946) is a Filipino businessman and lawyer from Cagayan who served as the Secretary of the Department of Transportation under the Duterte administration from 2016 to 2022. He previously held the position of President and chief executive officer of Clark Development Corporation, an attached agency of the government-owned Bases Conversion and Development Authority under the late President Benigno Aquino III.

== Early life and education ==
Tugade was born on January 9, 1946, to poor parents from Claveria, Cagayan, Francisco Tugade and Lucefina Planta. His parents were both employed at the Department of Public Works and Communication (now Department of Public Works and Highways) and he was in elementary school when they moved to Sampaloc, Manila.

Tugade attended law school at the San Beda College of Law, where he was classmates with President Rodrigo Duterte. He graduated magna cum laude in 1971. He completed his post-graduate studies at the National University of Singapore under the NUS-Stanford Executive Program in 1985.

== Career and businesses ==
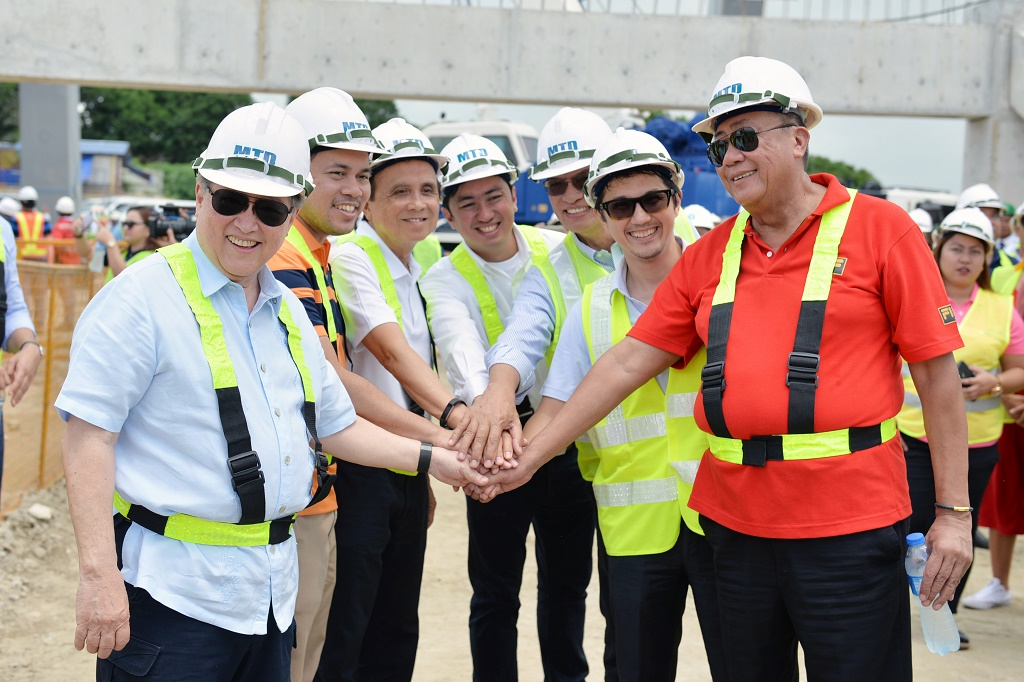
Tugade (in orange shirt) with the Build! Build! Build! team at New Clark City in 2018

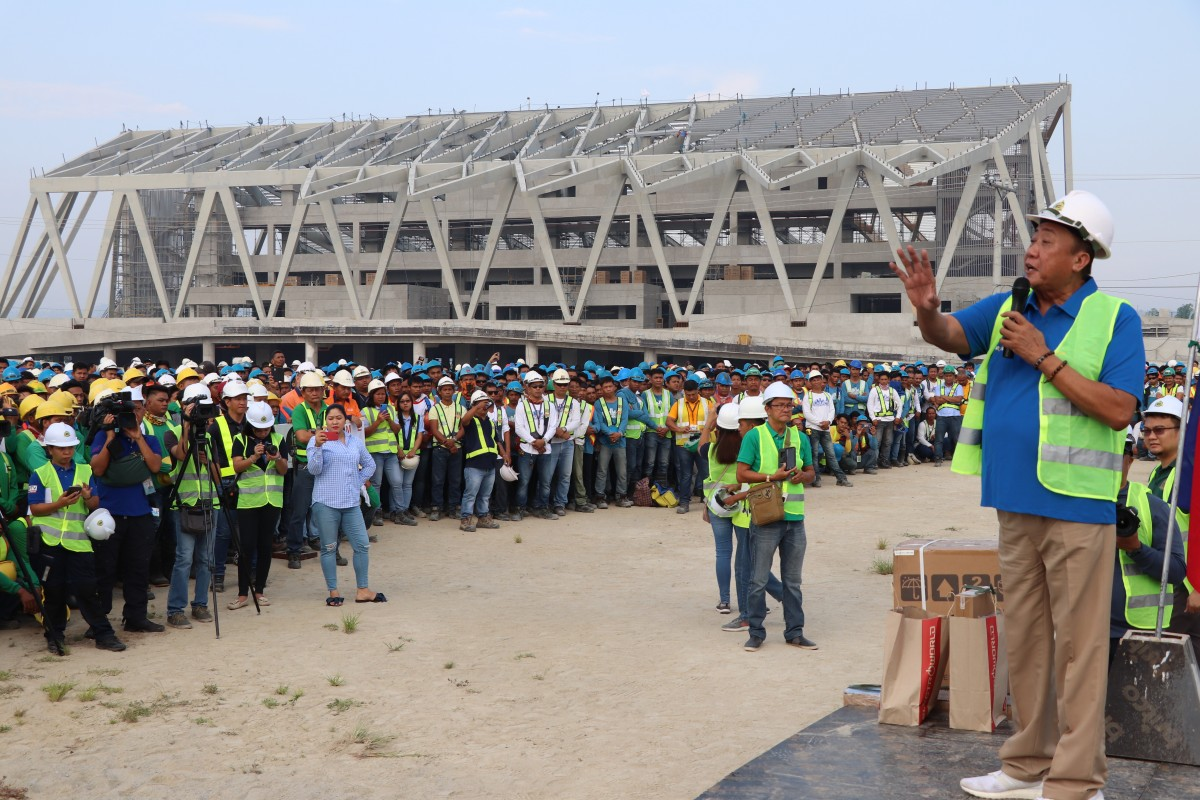
Tugade speaks during a tribute to New Clark City labor force in 2019, with the New Clark City Aquatics Center at the background

Tugade engaged in private law practice before joining government service. He was a partner at Bengzon, Verano, Tugade and Escolin Law Office. He also pursued a career in global logistics, information technology, tourism and consumer products business serving as chairman and president of several firms, including Transnational Diversified Group, Yusen Air and Sea Services, TDG Asia Corporation, Harmony Organic Farms, and Easycall Communications.

Tugade founded Perry's Realty, named after his son who died from an asthma attack at age 12. The company grew to become Perry's Holding Corporation which employs more than 350 employees in 10 corporations of the Perry's Group of Companies which include Transglobal Equipment Leasing, Perry's Technology, ATP Travel, Perryome, Transglobal Trucking and Transglobal Consolidators, Inc.

In 2012, Tugade was named president and chief executive officer of the Clark Development Corporation.

=== Pandora Papers controversy ===
The International Consortium of Investigative Journalists (ICIJ) through Philippine partners Philippine Center for Investigative Journalism (PCIJ) and Rappler released details of offshore companies listed under Tugade's Solart Holdings Limited, a British Virgin Islands-based firm since 2007 as part its investigation into the Pandora Papers. Solart Holdings was incorporated by the Trident Trust Group, the global financial services provider that listed Tugade and his three children as the beneficial owners. The documents detail that Solart had assets worth US$1.5 million (₱75 million) in the form of cash, bonds, and securities received as income from the business entities under the Perry's Group of Companies named after Tugade's late son, Mark Perry. The said company was not listed under his annual Statement of Assets, Liabilities and Net worth (SALN) as required under Philippine anti-corruption legislation.

==== Response ====
In response to his involvement in the Pandora Papers, Tugade said he has been "transparent" on his financial standing, saying the offshore investment organized by his family in 2003 has been disclosed in his 2012 to 2020 SALNs as intangible personal properties categorized as offshore investments. Tugade also claimed that the offshore account had barely been touched during his tenure as a government official, reiterating that he is not hiding any investments and stated that he would be ready to answer any allegations.

The Department of Transportation also issued a statement on the issue warning that a legal team will track down the source of what they referred to as a "malicious" and "well-oiled" report. It said the allegations against the secretary "reeks of black propaganda" for the 2022 Philippine Senate election, where Tugade is running for senator.

== Awards ==
In November 2022, he was awarded the Order of the Rising Sun, 2nd Class, Gold and Silver Star.

Political offices
| Preceded by Joseph Emilio Abaya as Secretary of Transportation and Communications | Secretary of Transportation; 2016–2022 | Succeeded by Jaime Bautista |
