= Jaime Bautista =

Filipino economist

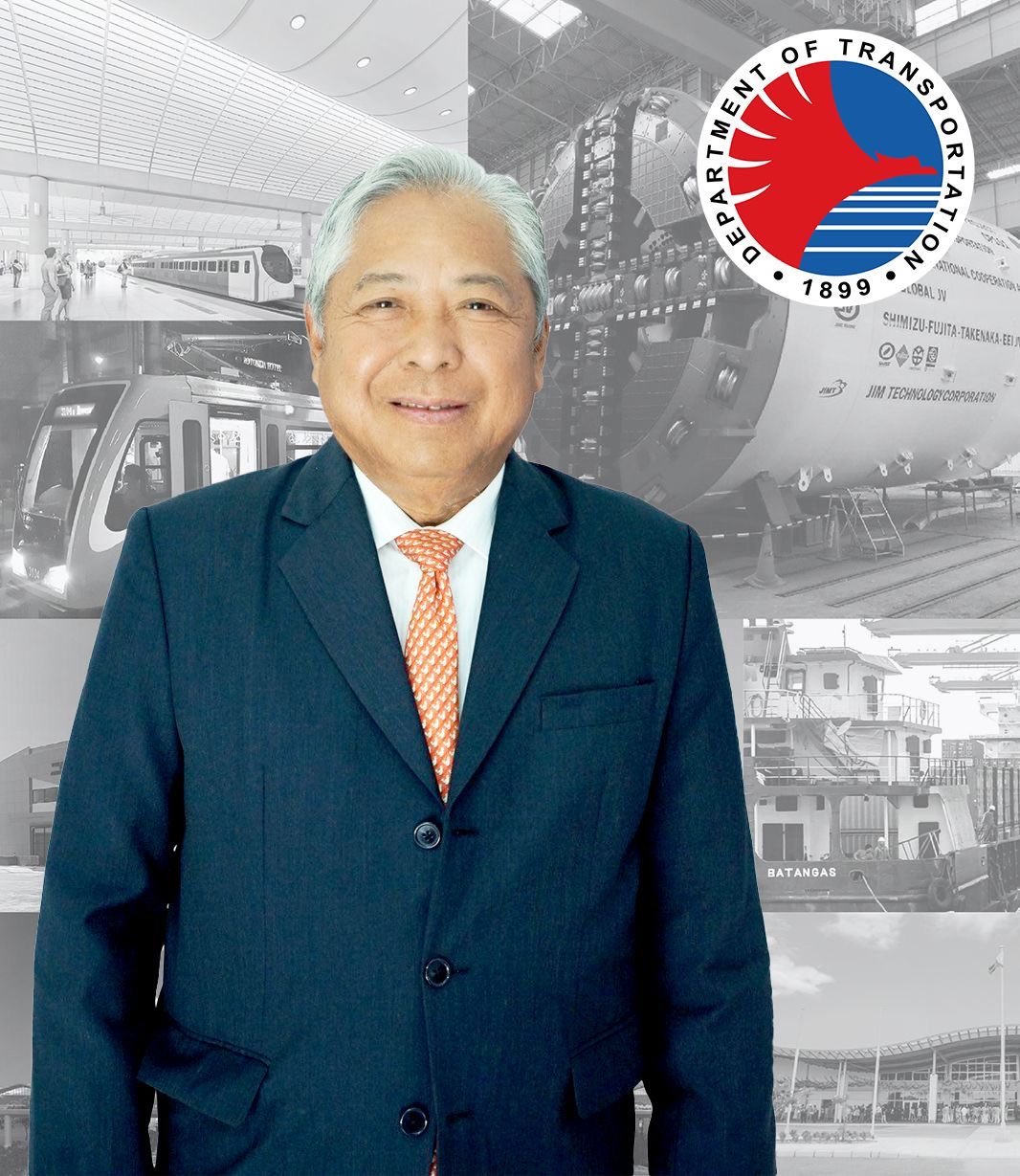
- Official portrait, 2023

40th Secretary of Transportation
- In office June 30, 2022 – February 21, 2025
- President: Bongbong Marcos
- Preceded by: Arthur Tugade
- Succeeded by: Vince Dizon

President of Philippine Airlines
- In office 2004–2012
- Preceded by: Avelino Zapanta
- Succeeded by: Ramon Ang
- In office 2014–2019
- Preceded by: Ramon Ang
- Succeeded by: Gilbert Santa Maria

Personal details
- Born: Jaime Jimenez Bautista; February 10, 1957 (age 69)
- Education: Colegio de San Juan de Letran (B.S.)
- Occupation: Businessman
- Military career
- Allegiance: Philippines
- Branch: Philippine Coast Guard
- Service years: 2024–present
- Unit: Commodore

Jaime "Jimmy" Jimenez Bautista (born February 10, 1957) is a Filipino entrepreneur who previously served as the Secretary of the Department of Transportation of the Philippines from 2022 to 2025. He also served as president and chief operating officer of Philippine Airlines from 2004 to 2012, and again from 2014 up to 2019.

== Background ==
Bautista is an independent director of Premium Leisure Corp. and Nickel Asia Corp. He is the former president and Chief Operating Officer of Philippine Airlines, Inc., as well as a former executive and director in MacroAsia Corporation, Macroasia Airport Services Corporation, Macroasia Properties Development Corporation and ETON Properties Philippines, Inc. He was also a treasurer of Tan Yan Kee Foundation, Inc. He served in various executive capacities in the Lucio Tan group for 39 years, the last 24 years for Philippine Airlines and its subsidiaries.

== Education ==
Bautista graduated magna cum laude from the Colegio de San Juan de Letran in 1977, with a degree of Bachelor of Science in commerce, major in accounting. He is a Certified Public Accountant. In 2018, he was conferred an honorary Doctorate in Humanities (Honoris Causa) by Central Luzon State University in recognition of his contributions to the field.

== Recognition and Local Initiatives ==
In February 2023, Bautista was recognized as a Natatanging Anak ng Cabanatuan (Outstanding Son of Cabanatuan) during the city’s 73rd founding anniversary and Banatu Festival. He expressed gratitude for the recognition and pledged to improve transportation for his fellow Cabanatueños. He also announced that the Department of Transportation had secured funding to study the extension of the Philippine National Railways, with upcoming projects planned from Manila to Ilocos and Manila to Cabanatuan.

Business positions
Preceded by Avelino Zapanta	President of Philippine Airlines; 2004–2012	Succeeded by Ramon Ang
Preceded by Ramon Ang	President of Philippine Airlines; 2014–2019	Succeeded by Gilbert Santa Maria
Political offices
Preceded by Arthur Tugade	Secretary of Transportation; 2022–2025	Succeeded by Vince Dizon
