= Jose de Jesus =

Filipino politician

Secretary of Transportation and Communications
- In office June 30, 2010 – June 30, 2011
- President: Benigno Aquino III
- Preceded by: Anneli R. Lontoc (Acting)
- Succeeded by: Mar Roxas

Secretary of Public Works and Highways
- In office 1990 – March 1, 1993
- President: Corazon Aquino; Fidel Ramos
- Preceded by: Fiorello Estuar
- Succeeded by: Eduardo Mir

Personal details
- Occupation: Meralco COO

Jose de Jesus is a former Philippine Secretary of the Department of Transportation and Communications. On June 29, 2010, President Benigno Aquino III picked him as his Secretary of Transportation and Communications.

== Background ==
Before being appointed by Benigno Aquino III to the Transportation and Communications secretary post, de Jesus is the president and chief operating officer of Meralco Corporation. He previously served as the Secretary of the Philippine Department of Public Works and Highways secretary in the Cabinet of Noynoy's mother, former president Corazon Aquino, and during the time of ex-president Fidel Ramos. He also served as the former president of Manila North Tollways Corporation in 2005.

== DOTC Secretary ==
According to President Benigno Aquino III, de Jesus "is a work-driven individual who will oversee the transformation of DOTC characterized by the NBN-ZTE deal into an agency that truly serves the interests of the people." de Jesus "ensured the affordability of telecommunications services as soon as he gets familiarized with his department."

After one year in office, de Jesus announced his resignation effective June 30, 2011. At the time, de Jesus stated that he wanted to return to the Private sector as the cause of his resignation.

Preceded by Anneli R. Lontoc (Acting)	Secretary of Transportation and Communications; 2010–2011	Succeeded by Mar Roxas
Preceded by Fiorello Estuar	Secretary of Public Works and Highways; 1990–1993	Succeeded by Eduardo Mir
