= Department of Public Works and Highways =

Executive department of the Philippine government

- Kagawaran ng mga Pagawain at Lansangang Bayan
- Logo

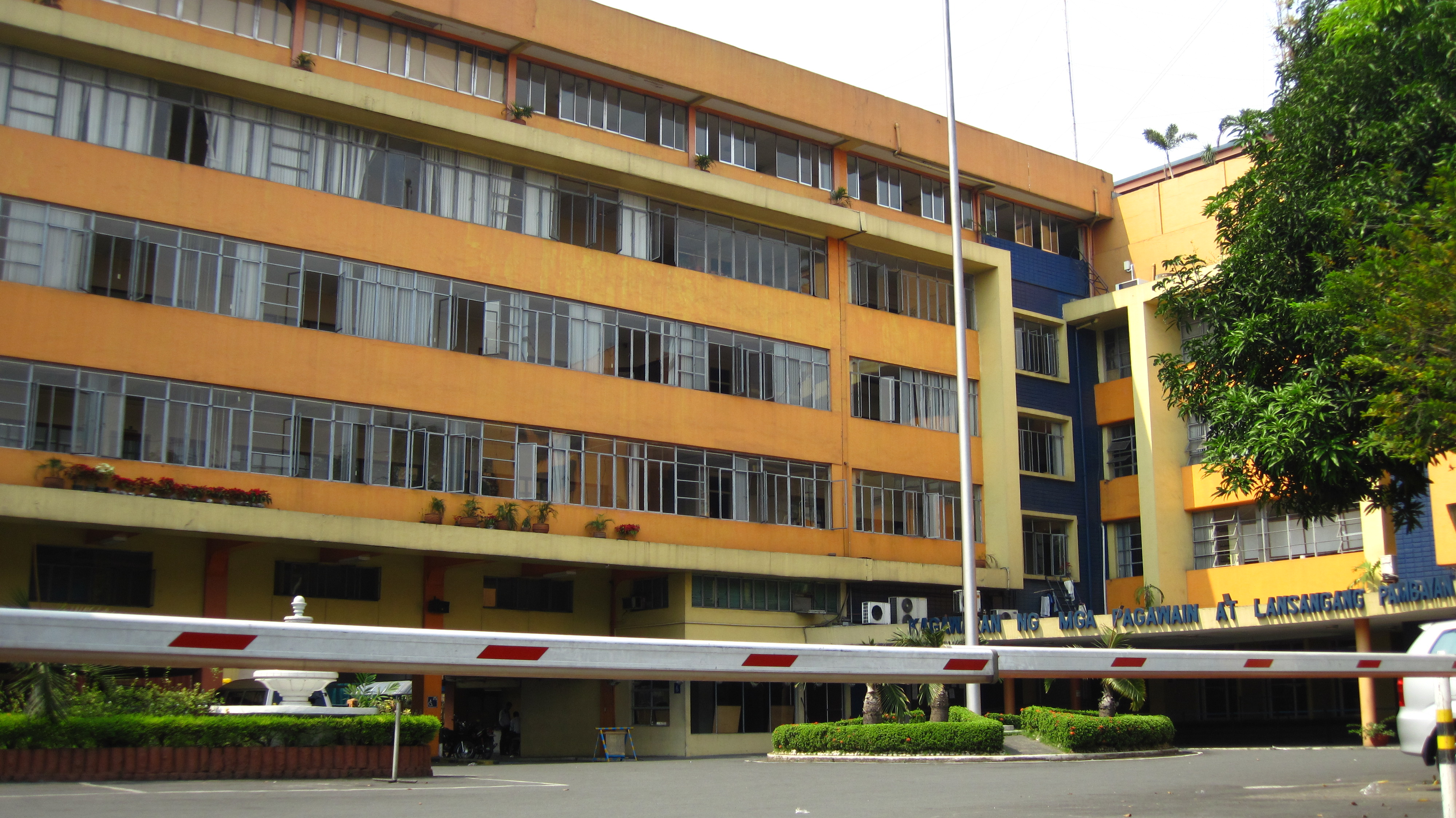
- DPWH building

Department overview
- Formed: June 23, 1898; 128 years ago (under the First Republic); January 30, 1981; 45 years ago (present form)
- Headquarters: Bonifacio Drive, Port Area, Manila
- Employees: 19,969 (2024)
- Annual budget: ▼ ₱718.4 billion (2023)
- Department executives: Giovanni Z. Lopez, Secretary; Carlos G. Mutuc, Chief of Staff, Office of the Secretary and Undersecretary for Special Concerns
- Website: www.dpwh.gov.ph

The Department of Public Works and Highways (DPWH; Filipino: Kagawaran ng mga Pagawain at Lansangang Pambayan) is the executive department of the Philippine government responsible for serving as the country's engineering and construction arm. It is tasked with implementing the government's policy to maintain and develop its engineering capabilities to ensure the safety, efficiency, and quality of public infrastructure and construction projects.

The DPWH oversees the planning, design, construction, and maintenance of infrastructure across the country, particularly national highways, flood control systems, water resources development, and other public works. Its functions are to be carried out in a decentralized manner, as much as possible.

Since 2025, following the flood control projects controversy, the department was again in the spotlight - heavily criticized regarding the mismanagement of aid, including reports of financial corruption and money laundering.

== History ==
History of the DPWH stretches back as far as the history of Philippine government itself. During Spanish times, the Spanish constructed the first roads in the Philippines. These public works projects were not only used in the connection of towns and fortresses, but also in improving communications. As Spain expanded the scale of its public works projects, it resorted to a policy of attraction through public works projects. In 1867, in order to pursue this objective, the King of Spain by decree designated the Spanish Governor-General as the Chief of Public Works assisted by Junta Consultiva through a Royal Degree in 1867.

It was in 1868 that the DPWH was born as the Bureau of Public Works and Highways, or Obras Publicas. Alongside the Bureau of Communications and Transportation (Communicaciones y Meteologia), now the Department of Transportation, the DPWH was organized under a civil engineer known as the “Director General”. It was responsible for all public works projects being done in the islands.

During the Philippine Revolution, public works duties were assumed by a new department known as the Department of War and Public Works (DWPW). Although initially included in the portfolio of the Department of War (now the Department of National Defense), public works projects were so important to the war effort that public works were also prioritized through this department.

During the American period, public works projects were initially put in the hands of the U.S. Army Corps of Engineers. However, this was transferred to a department known as the "Provincial Supervisions" on February 6, 1901. This eventually became the Department of Commerce and Police (DCP) in 1902, with two public works-related agencies, the Bureau of Engineering and Construction for public works projects and the Bureau of Architecture and Construction for the construction of public buildings. Both agencies were eventually merged into a bureau known as the Bureau of Public Works and was eventually subsumed into the DCP during reorganization in 1905. To keep pace with further developments in transportation and communications, the DCP was transformed into the Department of Commerce and Communications (DCC) in 1921.

In 1931, the DCC was renamed by the Philippine Legislature the Department of Public Works and Communication (DPWC). Upon the inauguration of the Commonwealth of the Philippines in 1935, the DPWC was reorganized to contain the following bureaus: the Bureau of Public Works, Ports, Aeronautics, Coast and Geodetic Survey, the Metropolitan Water District Division of Marine, Railway and Repair Shop, National Radio Broadcasting, the Irrigation Council and Board of Examiners for Civil, Mechanical, Chemical and Mining Engineers.

During World War II, the DPWC's offices were destroyed in the Japanese occupation of the Philippines. It resumed operations in 1946, albeit with limited funds and manpower. To assist reconstruction efforts, the U.S. Bureau of Public Roads set up an office in the Philippines to coordinate with the Philippine Bureau of Public Works in implementing the Philippine highway network, which was in ruins.

The DPWC was renamed in 1951 the Department of Public Works, Transportation and Communications, or DPWTC. In 1954, a body named the Bureau of Public Highways was established. This became a separate department on July 1, 1974. Two years later, with the adoption of the 1976 amendments to the 1973 Constitution, the department became the Ministries of Public Works, Transportation and Communications, and Public Highways, respectively. In 1979, the MPWTC was split into two ministries, the Ministry of Public Works (MPW) and the Ministry of Transportation and Communications (MOTC). After two years, the public works and highways ministries were merged, becoming the Ministry of Public Works and Highways in 1981.

On January 30, 1987, with the approval of the 1987 Constitution, the ministry was reconfigured into a department.

In July 1991, the Sandiganbayan issued a warrant of arrest against former minister Jesus Hipolito and former deputy minister Aber Canlas, as well as eight other engineers of MPWH, charging them with graft for their involvement in "ghost" dredging projects meant for improving Metro Manila's rivers in 1985 that cost up to ₱200 million. On December 11, 2008, the Sandiganbayan acquitted seven Marcos-era officials, including Deputy Minister Aber Canlas, of estafa and falsification of public documents related to the dredging of Talayan-Balinghasa Creek and the Lakandula Main outlet at Manila Bay, citing insufficient evidence that the officials had conspired with private contractor Aurora Panlilio to falsify project completion reports. Canlas was recognized during his career for his professional reputation, noted for his integrity and strong work ethic within the Department of Public Works and Highways.

== Declared state policy on public works and highways ==
The State shall maintain an engineering and construction arm and continuously develop its technology, for the purposes of ensuring the safety of all infrastructure facilities and securing for all public works and highways the highest efficiency and the most appropriate quality in construction. The planning, design, construction and maintenance of infrastructure facilities, especially national highways, flood control and water resources development systems, and other public works in accordance with national development objectives, shall be the responsibility of such an engineering and construction arm. However, the exercise of this responsibility shall be decentralized to the fullest extent feasible.

== Mandate of the DPWH ==
The Department of Public Works and Highways shall be the State's engineering and construction arm and is tasked to carry out the policy enunciated above (Section 2, Ibid.).

== Powers and functions of the DPWH ==
The department, in order to carry out its mandate, shall:

1. Provide technical services for the planning, design, construction, maintenance, or operation of infrastructure facilities;
2. Develop and implement effective codes, standards, and reasonable guidelines to ensure the safety of all public and private structures in the country and assure efficiency and proper quality in the construction of public works;
3. Ascertain that all public works plans and project implementation designs are consistent with current standards and guidelines;
4. Identify, plan, secure funding for, program, design, construct or undertake prequalification, bidding, and award of contracts of public works projects with the exception only of specialized projects undertaken by Government corporate entities with established technical capability and as directed by the President of the Philippines or as provided by law;
5. Provide the works supervision function for all public works constructions and ensure that actual construction is done in accordance with approved government plans and specifications;
6. Assist other agencies, including the local governments, in determining the most suitable entity to undertake the actual construction of public works projects;
7. Maintain or cause to be maintained all highways, flood control, and other public works throughout the country except those that are the responsibility of other agencies as directed by the President of the Philippines or as provided by law;
8. Provide an integrated planning for highways, flood control and water resource development systems, and other public works;
9. Classify road and highways into national, regional, provincial, city, municipal, and barangay roads and highways, based on objective criteria it shall adopt; provide or authorize the conversion of roads and highways from one category to another; and
10. Delegate, to any agency it determines to have the adequate technical capability, any of the foregoing powers and functions; and
11. Perform such other functions as may be provided by law (Section 3, Ibid.).

== Organizational structure ==
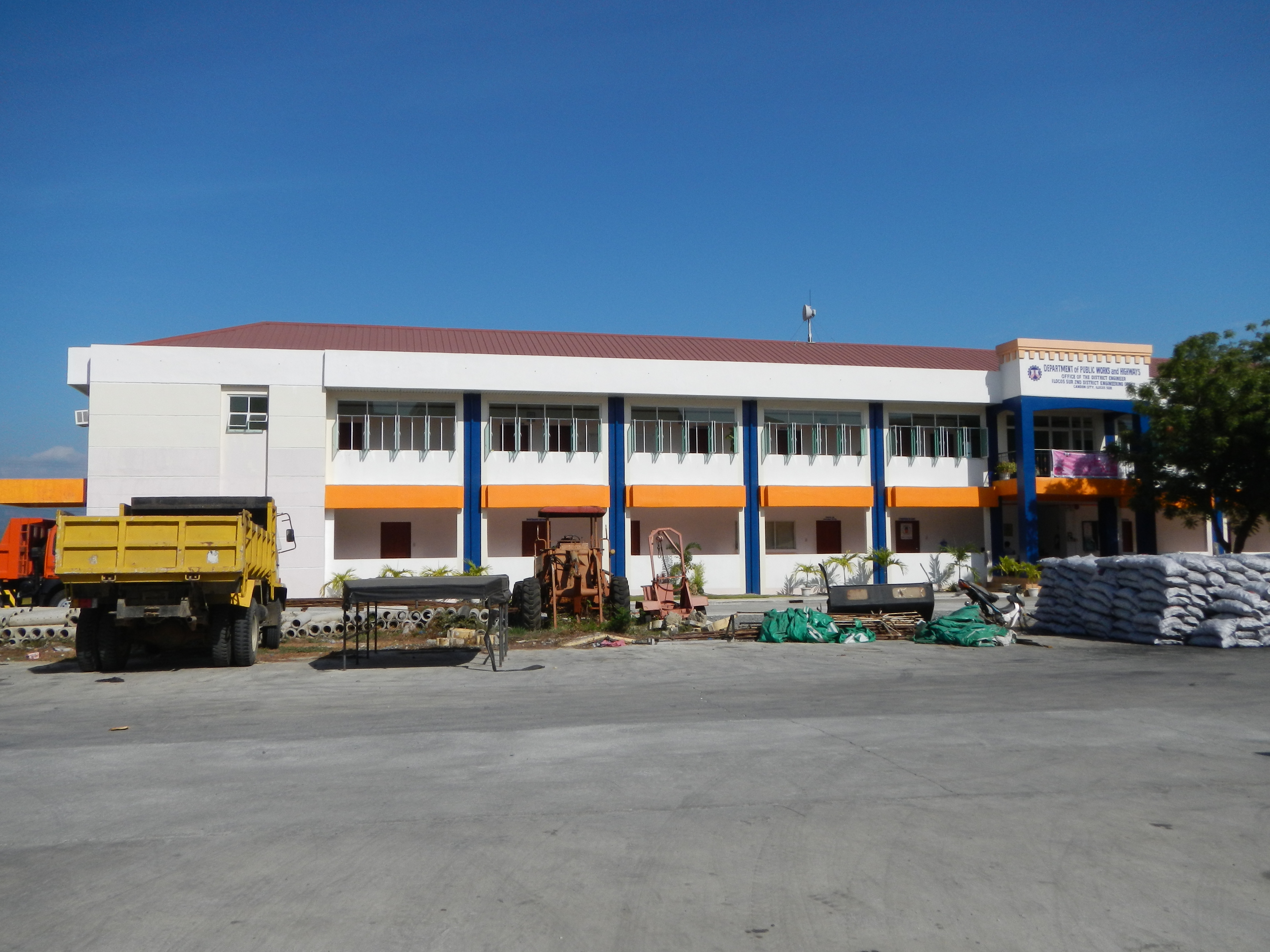
DPWH Ilocos Sur 2nd Engineering District Office in Candon, Ilocos Sur

The department is headed by the Secretary of Public Works and Highways (Philippines), with the following nine undersecretaries and seven assistant secretaries

- Senior Undersecretary
- Undersecretary for Regional Operations in CAR and Regions I, II, and IX to XIII
- Undersecretary for Regional Operations in NCR and Regions III to VIII
- Undersecretary for Information Management and Technical Services
- Undersecretary for Support Services
- Undersecretary for Planning and Public-Private Partnership Services
- Undersecretary for Special Concerns and Chief of Staff, Office of the Secretary
- Undersecretary for Legal Services
- Undersecretary for Operations In Charge of Convergence Projects
- Assistant Secretary for Regional Operations in CAR and Regions I, II, and IX to XIII
- Assistant Secretary for Regional Operations in NCR and Regions III to VIII
- Assistant Secretary for Support Services
- Assistant Secretary for Planning Service
- Assistant Secretary for Legal Service
- Assistant Secretary for Legislative Liaison Office
- Assistant Secretary for Information Management and Technical Services

== Bureaus ==
- Bureau of Construction
- Bureau of Design
- Bureau of Equipment
- Bureau of Maintenance
- Bureau of Quality & Safety
- Bureau of Research & Standards

== Services ==
- Finance Service
- Human Resource and Administrative Service
- Information Management Service
- Internal Audit Service
- Legal Service
- Planning Service
- Procurement Service
- Public-Private Partnership Service
- Stakeholders Relations Service

== Attached agencies ==
- Local Water Utilities Administration (LWUA)

== Statistics ==
=== Budget ===
View source data.
