= Sexual disorder =

A sexual disorder is a type of medical condition which may refer to:

- Sexual dysfunction (e.g., erectile dysfunction, hypoactive sexual desire disorder, female sexual arousal disorder, anorgasmia, delayed ejaculation, premature ejaculation, spontaneous orgasm, sexual anhedonia, dyspareunia, vaginismus)
- Paraphilia
- Hypersexuality
- Sex offending
- Disorders of sex development
- Sexually transmitted infection
- Sexual phobia
- Sexual relationship disorder
- Sexual maturation disorder
- Sexual orientation obsessive–compulsive disorder
