= Sexual maturation disorder =

- Specialty: Psychiatry, Psychology

Sexual maturation disorder was listed in the tenth edition of the World Health Organization's (WHO) International Classification of Diseases, the ICD-10, the most widely used diagnostic manual by psychiatrists and psychologists worldwide. It was described as a disorder of anxiety or depression related to an uncertainty about one's gender identity or sexual orientation. In 2014, it was determined that there was no justification for the existence of this mental disorder category, and the diagnosis was not included in the ICD-11, which went into effect in January 2022.

== History ==
Sexual maturation disorder, along with ego-dystonic sexual orientation and sexual relationship disorder, was introduced to the ICD in 1990, replacing the ICD-9 diagnosis of homosexuality. The following note was applied to the entirety of part F66, the section in which these three diagnoses appeared: "Sexual orientation by itself is not to be regarded as a disorder."

== Removal from ICD ==
As part of the development of the ICD-11, the WHO appointed a Working Group on the Classification of Sexual Disorders and Sexual Health to make recommendations on the disease categories related to sexual orientation (part F66). The working group recommended the entire part F66 be deleted due to a lack of clinical utility, a lack of usefulness in public health data, and the potential for negative consequences, including the risk that these categories might lend support to "ineffective and unethical treatment" such as conversion therapy. It noted that there is no evidence that non-heterosexual sexual orientation is itself a cause of distress; instead, there is robust empirical evidence that psychological symptoms in non-heterosexual people are the product of discrimination, social rejection, and stigma.

In reference to sexual maturation disorder specifically, the working group noted the possibility that this diagnostic category conflated normal developmental patterns with pathological processes, and also noted that people with a non-heterosexual sexual orientation or who are gender nonconforming may experience social stress due to stigma, but such distress is not indicative of a disorder.

Accordingly, the ICD-11 does not include any diagnostic categories that can be applied to people on the basis of sexual orientation, bringing the ICD in line with the DSM-5.

== See also ==
- Homosexuality and psychology
- Questioning (sexuality and gender)
- Homosexuality in the DSM
