= Homosexual panic =

Panic due to the pressure of uncontrollable perverse sexual cravings

"Homosexual panic" is a term coined by American psychiatrist Edward J. Kempf in 1920 for a condition of "panic due to the pressure of uncontrollable perverse sexual cravings". Kempf classified this condition as an acute pernicious dissociative disorder, meaning that it involved a disruption in typical perception and memory functions of an individual. In the psychiatrist's honour, the condition has come to also be known as "Kempf's disease". Although homosexuality itself was removed from the APA's DSM in 1973, some form of homosexual panic was retained in the manual until the release of DSM-V in 2013.

== Signs and symptoms ==
In his case studies, Kempf recorded a variety of symptoms that his patients presented with. Psychotic symptoms included hallucinations and delusions, especially those of persecution. Kempf cites Case PD-14, who insisted he had been framed for his behavior and accused his shipmates of conspiring to harm or kill him. Somatic symptoms were also common, including dizziness, nausea, and vomiting. In 1959, author Burton Glick documented mood-related symptoms, such as self-punishment, suicidal ideation, social withdrawal, and feelings of helplessness. Glick noted that patients appeared passive, and demonstrated an "inability to be aggressive". Ultimately, patients became "unable to function at all". Both Glick and Kempf emphasize their patients' lack of aggression towards homosexual individuals. In a study of college-aged men, Henry Harper Hall found that men who exhibited symptoms in line with homosexual panic never acted out towards homosexual individuals; instead, they blamed themselves for their own cravings. Kempf noted that the difference between patients who fared well after their diagnoses and those who did not was the patient's successful "transference" of such homosexual cravings. If a patient was able to transfer these impulses towards another, more socially appropriate target, the patient would begin to feel less inferior and would thus recover.

== Cause ==
Spending copious amounts of time with members of the same sex in a confined or limited atmosphere was cited by Kempf as a possible reason for the onset of the disorder. Environments where this might occur included but were not limited to army camps, ships, monasteries, schools, asylums, and prisons. Kempf asserted that individuals in these environments who had recently or were currently undergoing stress (due to fatigue, sickness, loss of a love interest, etc.) were more likely to have weak egos. According to the Freudian theory of psychoanalysis, the ego is the part of an individual's mind that mediates between the primitive unconscious and reality. When in such a position, affected individuals would become "eccentric and irritable", tending to feel inferior and weak amongst their companions.

The onset of this condition was not attributed to unwanted homosexual advances. Rather, Kempf stated that it was caused by the individual's own "aroused homosexual cravings". The individual's homosexual feelings as a cause of their symptoms was what differentiated this diagnosis from any other stress-related disorder.

== Diagnosis ==
=== Differential diagnosis ===
Homosexual panic disorder is a separate diagnosis from acute aggression panic disorder. Glick notes that the difference is explained by differing instinctual drives that motivate each disorder. Patients whose primary motivation is a sexual one are experiencing homosexual panic, whereas patients whose motivation is primarily aggression are experiencing acute aggression panic disorder. As stated above, both Glick and Kempf noted in their accounts of patients that those with homosexual panic disorder were not aggressive toward others. Also in concordance with this, Hart's study concluded that those individuals with homosexual panic who chose to satisfy homosexual urges experienced relief from their symptoms.

== History ==
Kempf identified the condition after completing 19 case studies during and after World War I at St. Elizabeths Hospital, a government mental institution in Washington, D.C. The case studies lasted months in some cases, and consisted of extensive unstructured patient interviews. Kempf would, over the course of multiple sessions, investigate the personal history of the patient and the events that led up to hospitalization in order to diagnose them with homosexual panic. Among the cases described by Kempf is a "physician ... who later became a brilliant philologist", born in Ceylon in 1834 to missionary parents, and graduating from Yale Medical School before serving as an army surgeon—an apparent reference to William Chester Minor.

The disorder was included in Appendix C of the DSM-I as a supplementary term, which are terms that may be added on to an existing diagnosis to further explain the patient's condition. In order for mental health professionals to apply a diagnosis to a patient, the diagnosis must appear in the current edition of the DSM. The disorder has not appeared in any subsequent editions of the DSM, and thus is not considered a diagnosable condition.

Although homosexuality was removed from the DSM in 1973, the retaining of "sexual orientation disturbance" as a mental disorder lead to legal protection of discrimination. The New York Times, for example, made a psychological exam a requirement for employment - requiring applicants on penalty of perjury to disclose their sexuality. In one case, editor Abe Rosenthal claimed to want to hire a gay journalist, but the newspaper's staff doctor came into his office stating: "you can't hire this man. He's a homosexual." Rosenthal replied that he already knew, to which the doctor responded, "But don't you know that homosexuals are susceptible to homosexual rage?" Thus, it was through psychiatry homosexuals continued to be banned from employment.

== Legal defense ==
Homosexual panic as a mental health disorder is distinct from the victim blaming homosexual panic defense (HPD) (also known as the gay panic defense) within the legal system. Whereas homosexual panic disorder was at one point considered a diagnosable medical condition, the HPD implies only a temporary loss of self-control. The HPD is used to reduce the sentence against the perpetrator of assault or murder of a homosexual individual. In the US trial for the murder of Larry King, the HPD was used by defendant Brandon McInerny, who was convicted of voluntary manslaughter.

Between 2003 and 2017, both Australia (except South Australia) and New Zealand removed the defense. In September 2014, California became the first state to abolish the HPD in the USA.

== Attitudes about homosexuality ==
The absence of homosexual panic from the DSM-5 reflects changing societal attitudes toward homosexuality. Homosexuality as a mental disorder was removed from the DSM in 1973, a significant event in LGBT history. In 2013, 60% of Americans agreed that homosexuality should be accepted by society: an increase from 49% of Americans in 2007. Changing attitudes toward homosexuality have been influenced by LGBT movements in the United States.

== See also ==
- Homophobia
- Homosexuality in the DSM
- Homosexuality and psychology
- Gay chicken
