= Spann–Fischer Codependency Scale =

- Purpose: Measure co-dependency in order to operationalize it as a personality disorder

The Spann–Fischer Codependency Scale is a 16-item self-report instrument that has been proposed as a measure of co-dependency. The scale is based upon a definition of codependency as "a dysfunctional pattern of relating to others with an extreme focus outside of oneself, lack of expression of feelings, and personal meaning derived from relationships with others." Codependency has no established definition within the mental health community, and is not a recognized diagnosis as a mental health disorder.

Its creators are Judith L. Fischer and Lynda Spann, both from the Department of Human Development and Family Studies at Texas Tech University.

== Scoring ==
Individual items are rated on a 6-point Likert scale, and then summed with two reversed items to describe co-dependency on a scale from a high of 96 to a low of 16. Scores on the codependency scale distinguished known groups; furthermore, scores correlated as expected with intrapersonal measures as well as interpersonal perceptions of parenting in the family of origin.

The mean Spann–Fischer co-dependency score is approximated with a midpoint of 52.6, a "high" score of 67.2 and a "low" score of 37.3 suggested by Fischer, Spann, and Crawford (1991). No significant between-workshop differences were found for Spann–Fischer measures of co-dependency in the cases presented (F = .042, p = n.s.).

== Validation ==
The scale was evaluated through a series of studies, utilizing the definition of co-dependency as a dysfunctional pattern of relating to others with "an extreme focus outside oneself, lack of open expression of feelings, and attempts to derive a sense of purpose [exclusively] through relationships" with others. The Spann–Fischer Scale is reported to have good test-retest reliability ( > .80), and acceptable internal consistency (.62 < < .92), across studies.

Spann–Fischer scores have been associated with membership in Codependents Anonymous, gender, self-esteem, locus of control, depression, relationship with parents, and anxiety; narcissism, parental co-dependency, age, treatment outcomes and education, parenting style; powerlessness in relationships; and risk-taking - but not with parental chemical dependency; the number of family addictions, the severity of dysfunction in the family-of-origin, or alcoholism; childhood trauma; or family cohesion and adaptability.
