= Sexual relationship disorder =

- Specialty: Psychiatry

Sexual relationship disorder was listed in the tenth edition of the World Health Organization's (WHO) International Classification of Diseases, the ICD-10, the most widely used diagnostic manual by psychiatrists and psychologists worldwide. It was described as a disorder where a person has difficulties forming or maintaining a sexual relationship because of their gender identity or sexual orientation. In 2014, it was determined that there was no justification for the existence of this mental disorder category, and the diagnosis was not included in the ICD-11, which went into effect in January 2022.

== History ==
Sexual relationship disorder, along with ego-dystonic sexual orientation and sexual maturation disorder, was introduced to the ICD in 1990, replacing the ICD-9 diagnosis of homosexuality. The following note was applied to the entirety of part F66, the section in which these three diagnoses appeared: "Sexual orientation by itself is not to be regarded as a disorder."

== Removal from ICD ==
As part of the development of the ICD-11, the WHO appointed a Working Group on the Classification of Sexual Disorders and Sexual Health to make recommendations on the disease categories related to sexual orientation (part F66). The working group recommended the entire part F66 be deleted due to a lack of clinical utility, a lack of usefulness in public health data, and the potential for negative consequences, including the risk that these categories might lend support to "ineffective and unethical treatment" such as conversion therapy. It noted that there is no evidence that non-heterosexual sexual orientation is itself a cause of distress; instead, there is robust empirical evidence that psychological symptoms in non-heterosexual people are the product of discrimination, social rejection, and stigma.

In reference to sexual relationship disorder specifically, the working group noted that difficulties in sexual relationships are common and have many causes, and concluded that "there is no justification for creating a mental disorder category that is specifically based on the co-occurrence of relationship problems with sexual orientation or gender identity issues" when no other causes of relationship difficulties receive a diagnostic category.

Accordingly, the ICD-11 does not include any diagnostic categories that can be applied to people on the basis of sexual orientation, bringing the ICD in line with the DSM-5.

== See also ==
- Ego-dystonic sexual orientation
- Homosexuality and psychology
- Mixed-orientation marriage
- Homosexuality in the DSM
