= Sexual phobias =

Sexual phobia may refer to:

- Sex-related phobias
  - Genophobia, fear of sexual relations or intercourse
  - Sexophobia, fear of sex organs
    - Eurotophobia, aversion to, fear of, or dislike of vulvas
    - Phallophobia, fear of penis
  - Erotophobia, fear or aversion to sex or related matters
  - Gymnophobia, fear of nudity
- Phobias that can affect or related to sexual life
  - Philematophobia, fear of kissing
  - Haphephobia, fear of touching
  - Nosophobia, fear of contracting diseases
  - Mysophobia, fear of contamination and germs
  - Philophobia, fear of love
  - Tokophobia, fear of childbirth
  - Sarmassophobia, fear of love game
  - Anthropophobia, fear of people

Non-clinical phobias

- LGBTQ-phobias
  - See Discrimination against LGBTQ people
- Sexual orientation discrimination
- Whorephobia

== See also ==
- Absexual
- Antisexualism
- List of phobias
- Sexual disorder
