= Robert Cabaj =

American psychiatrist (1948–2020)

- Born: Robert Piotr Cabaj; November 28, 1948
- Died: February 24, 2020 (aged 71)
- Education: University of Notre Dame; Harvard Medical School
- Occupation: Psychiatrist
- Employer: University of California, San Francisco

Robert Piotr Cabaj (28 November 1948 – 24 February 2020) was an American psychiatrist, scholar and author, known for his extensive publications on LGBT mental health, including editing one of the early and influential textbooks in the field. He served as president of the Association of Gay and Lesbian Psychiatrists (AGLP) and of the Gay and Lesbian Medical Association.

== Early life ==
Cabaj grew up in Chicago, Illinois. He attended the University of Notre Dame receiving his B.S. in 1970 and then matriculated at Harvard Medical School. He moved to San Francisco in 1991 and lived and worked in the Bay Area for the next three decades. During the 1980s and 1990s, he worked, taught, and wrote on topics of mental health in LGBT people and in mental health in relation to HIV/AIDS.

== Career ==
Cabaj was very active in medical and psychiatric professional societies, including the American Psychiatric Association, the California Psychiatric Association, the Northern California Psychiatric Society, and the American Medical Association. He was president of the American Association of Physicians for Human Rights when it changed its name in 1994 to the Gay and Lesbian Medical Association to more openly reflect its membership and mission of advocating for LGBT physicians. He was quoted in the Los Angeles Times:

"Our name has kept us hidden for the last 12 years or so", Cabaj says. "People in the know knew who we were. But I think we've learned that to fight the impact of homophobia on health care ... It should, hopefully, instill a new sense of pride in the members."

In 1996, he and colleague Terry Stein published one of the first evidence-based textbooks on LGBT mental health. He continued to write and speak on these topics and to be active in LGBT health and mental health organizations. He was frequently quoted on topics of LGBT mental health by outlets ranging from the New York Times to JAMA. He was an advisor on sex and gender considerations in DSM-IV.

In addition to his advocacy for LGBT patients and physicians, he strongly advocated for public psychiatry programs. He served for several years as the Director of the San Francisco Department of Mental Health. At the time of his death, he was chair of psychiatry and medical director for San Mateo County Behavioral Health and Recovery Services, in San Mateo, California, as well as associate clinical professor of psychiatry at University of California, San Francisco. Cabaj died in February 2020 at the age of 72.

== Notable publications ==
- Cabaj Robert P. (1988) "Homosexuality and neurosis: considerations for psychotherapy." Journal of Homosexuality, 15(1-2):13-23.
- Cabaj Robert P. (1989) AIDS and chemical dependency: special issues and treatment barriers for gay and bisexual men. Journal of Psychoactive Drugs; 21:387-393.
- Cabaj, Robert P., and Terry S. Stein, eds. Textbook of homosexuality and mental health. American Psychiatric Association, 1996.
- Cabaj, Robert P., and David W. Purcell, eds. (1998) On the road to same-sex marriage: a supportive guide to psychological, political, and legal issues. San Francisco: Jossey-Bass.
