= Abnormality (behavior) =

Behavioral characteristic

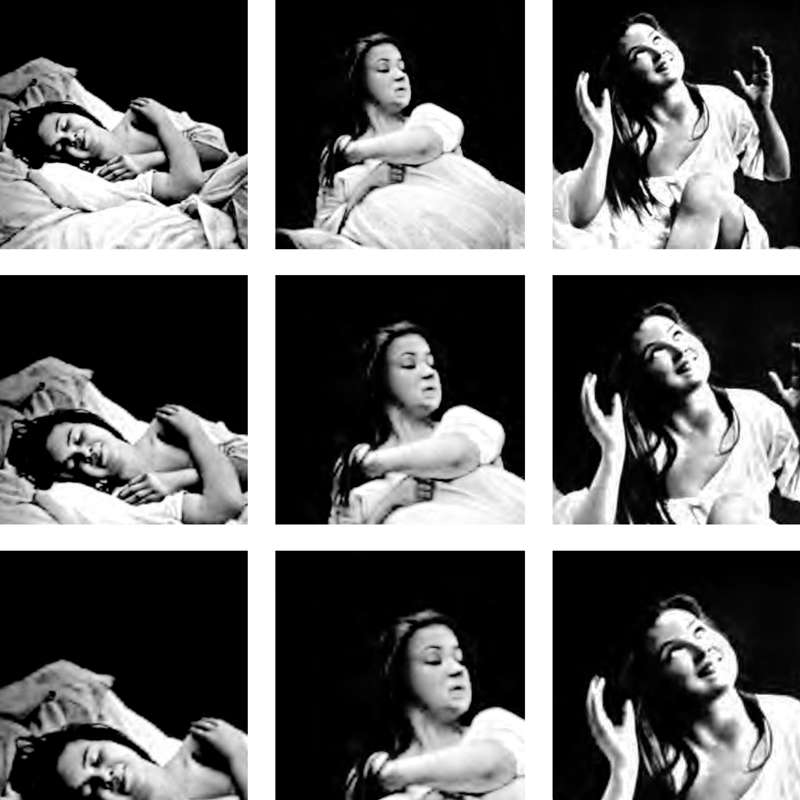
Photographs of a woman suffering from hysteria by Jean-Martin Charcot.

In psychology, abnormality (also dysfunctional behavior, maladaptive behavior, or deviant behavior) is a behavioral characteristic assigned to those with conditions that are regarded as dysfunctional. Behavior is considered to be abnormal when it is atypical or out of the ordinary, consists of undesirable behavior, and results in impairment in the individual's functioning. As applied to humans, abnormality may also encompass deviance, which refers to behavior that is considered to transgress social norms. The definition of abnormal behavior in humans is an often debated issue in abnormal psychology.

Abnormal behavior should not be confused with unusual behavior. Behavior that is out of the ordinary is not necessarily indicative of a mental disorder. Abnormal behavior, on the other hand, while not a mental disorder in itself, is often an indicator of a possible mental or psychological disorder. A psychological disorder is defined as an "ongoing dysfunctional pattern of thought, emotion, and behavior that causes significant distress, and is considered deviant in that person's culture or society". Abnormal behavior, as it relates to psychological disorders, would be "ongoing" and a cause of "significant distress". A mental disorder describes a patient who has a medical condition whereby the medical practitioner makes a judgment that the patient is exhibiting abnormal behavior based on the Diagnostic and Statistical Manual of Mental Disorders, Fifth Edition (DSM-5) criteria. Thus, a behavior simply being unusual does not make it abnormal; it is only considered abnormal if it meets these criteria. The DSM-5 is used by both researchers and clinicians in diagnosing a potential mental disorder. The criteria needed to be met in the DSM-5 vary for each mental disorder.

Unlike physical abnormalities in one's health where symptoms are objective, psychology health professionals cannot use objective symptoms when evaluating someone for abnormalities in behavior.

== Several conventional criteria ==
There are five main criteria of abnormality:

1. Statistical Criterion
2. Social Criterion
3. Personal Discomfort (Distress)
4. Maladaptive Behavior
5. Deviation from Ideal

Abnormal behaviors are "actions that are unexpected and often evaluated negatively because they differ from typical or usual behavior".

The following criteria are subjective:

- Maladaptive and malfunctional behaviors: behaviors, which, due to circumstance, are not fully adapted to the environment. Instead, they become malfunctional and detrimental to the individual, or others. For example, a mouse continuing to attempt to escape when escape is obviously impossible.
- Behavior that violates the standards of society. When people do not follow the conventional social and moral rules of their society, the behavior is considered to be abnormal.
- Observer discomfort. If a person's behavior brings discomfort to those in observation, it is likely to be considered abnormal.

The standard criteria in psychology and psychiatry is that of mental illness or mental disorder. Determination of abnormality in behavior is based upon medical diagnosis.

Other criteria include:

- Statistical infrequency: statistically rare behaviors are called abnormal. Though not always the case, the presence of abnormal behavior in people is usually rare or statistically unusual. Any specific abnormal behavior may be unusual, but it is not uncommon for people to exhibit some form of prolonged abnormal behavior at some point in their lives.
- Deviation from social norms: behavior that is deviant from social norms is defined as the departure or deviation of an individual from society's unwritten rules (norms). For example, if one were to witness a person jumping around, nude, on the streets, the person would likely be perceived as abnormal to most people, as they have broken society's norms about wearing clothing. There are also a number of criteria for one to examine before reaching a judgment as to whether someone has deviated from society's norms:
  - Culture: what may be seen as normal in one culture, may be seen as abnormal in another.
  - Situation & context one is placed in: for example, going to the toilet is a normal human act, but going in the middle of a supermarket would be most likely seen as highly abnormal, i.e., defecating or urinating in public is illegal as a misdemeanor act of indecent public conduct.
  - Age: a child at the age of three could get away with taking off clothing in public, but not a person at the age of twenty.
  - Gender: a male responding with behavior normally reacted to as female, and vice versa, is often likely to be seen as abnormal or deviant from social norms.
  - Historical context: standards of normal behavior change in some societies--sometimes very rapidly.
- Failure to function adequately: behavior that is abnormal. These criteria are necessary to label an abnormality as a disorder, if the individual is unable to cope with the demands of everyday life. Psychologists can disagree on the boundaries that define what is 'functioning' and what is 'adequately', however, as some behaviors that can cause 'failure to function' are not seen as bad. For example, firefighters risking their lives to save people in a blazing fire may be 'failing to function' in the fact that they are risking their lives, and in another context, their actions could be construed as pathological, but within the context of being a firefighter said risks are not at odds with adequate functioning.
- Deviation from ideal mental health: defines abnormality by determining if the behavior the individual is displaying is affecting their mental well-being. As with the failure to function definition, the boundaries that stipulate what 'ideal mental health' is are not clearly defined. A frequent problem with the definition is that all individuals at some point in their life deviate from ideal mental health, but it does not mean the behavior is abnormal. For example, someone who has lost a relative is distressed and deviates from "ideal mental health" for a time, but their distress is not defined as abnormal, as distress is an expected reaction.

A common approach to defining abnormality is a multi-criteria approach, where all definitions of abnormality are used to determine whether an individual's behavior is abnormal. For example, psychologists would be prepared to define an individual's behavior as "abnormal" if the following criteria are met:

- The individual is engaging in behavior that is preventing them from functioning.
- The individual is engaging in behavior that breaks a social norm.
- The individual is engaging in behavior that is statistically infrequent.

A good example of an abnormal behavior assessed by a multi-criteria approach is depression: it is commonly seen as a deviation from ideal mental stability, it often stops the individual from 'functioning' in normal life, and, although it is a relatively common mental disorder, it is still statistically infrequent. Most people do not experience significant major depressive disorder in their lifetime. Thus, depression and its associated behaviors would be considered abnormal.

== Controversy ==
There is some debate among professionals as to what constitutes abnormal behavior. In general, abnormal behavior is often classified under one of the "four D's," which are deviance, dysfunction, distress, and danger. The four D's, as well as the criterion mentioned above, are widely used to diagnose behavior as abnormal. However, the labeling of behaviors as abnormal can be controversial because abnormality is often subjective and what is considered abnormal changes over time. For example, before 1974, homosexuality was considered to be a mental disorder in the DSM. After activist movements and examination within the APA, it was replaced with sexual orientation disturbance, then eventually completely removed from the DSM. Now, the APA and the medical community consider homosexuality normal when it was formerly considered abnormal. Social constructs and culture are often determiners of what is normal and what is abnormal.

Additionally, abnormality in behavior does not necessarily indicate dysfunction. For example, one of the four D's of abnormal behavior is deviance, meaning that the behavior observed is not in alignment with what is the social or cultural norm. This may not imply that the behavior is dysfunctional or undesirable, however— it may simply mean that what is being observed is statistically deviant in a social or cultural context. In fact, deviance can often be positive and accepted by others. This is commonly seen in individuals such as Nobel Prize winners, geniuses, professional athletes, and extremely creative people.

== See also ==
- Anti-social behaviour
- Deviance
- Dysfunctional family
- Eccentricity (behavior)
- List of abnormal behaviors in animals
- Norm (social)
- Normalization (sociology)
- Psychopathy
- Social alienation
