= Homosexuality and psychology =

The field of psychology has extensively studied homosexuality as a human sexual orientation. The American Psychiatric Association listed homosexuality in the DSM-I in 1952 as a "sociopathic personality disturbance," but that classification came under scrutiny in research funded by the National Institute of Mental Health. That research and subsequent studies consistently failed to produce any empirical or scientific basis for regarding homosexuality as anything other than a natural and normal sexual orientation that is a healthy and positive expression of human sexuality.

As a result of this scientific research, the American Psychiatric Association removed homosexuality from the DSM-II in 1973. Upon a thorough review of the scientific data, the American Psychological Association followed in 1975 and also called on all mental health professionals to take the lead in "removing the stigma of mental illness that has long been associated" with homosexuality. In 1993, the National Association of Social Workers adopted the same position as the American Psychiatric Association and the American Psychological Association, in recognition of scientific evidence. The World Health Organization, which listed homosexuality in the ICD-9 in 1977, removed homosexuality from the ICD-10 which was endorsed by the 43rd World Health Assembly on 17 May 1990.

The consensus of scientific research and clinical literature demonstrate that same-sex attractions, feelings, and behaviors are normal and positive variations of human sexuality. There is now a large body of scientific evidence that indicates that being gay, lesbian, or bisexual is compatible with normal mental health and social adjustment.

== Historical background ==
The view of homosexuality as a psychological disorder has been seen in literature since research on homosexuality first began; however, psychology as a discipline has evolved over the years in its position on homosexuality. Current attitudes have their roots in religious, legal, and cultural underpinnings. Some Ancient Near Eastern communities, such as the Israelites, had strict codes forbidding homosexual activity, and when Christianity began, it adopted their Jewish predecessors attitudes surrounding homosexual activities. Among the New Testament authors Paul in particular is notable for his affirmation and reinforcement of such texts in his letters to nascent churches. Later, the Apostolic Fathers and their successors continued to speak against homosexual activity whenever they mentioned it in their writings. In the early Middle Ages the Christian Church ignored homosexuality in secular society; however, by the end of the 12th century, hostility towards homosexuality began to emerge and spread through Europe's secular and religious institutions. There were official expressions condemning the "unnatural" nature of homosexual behavior in the works of Thomas Aquinas and others. Until the 19th century, homosexual activity was referred to as "unnatural, crimes against nature", sodomy or buggery and was punishable by law, sometimes by death.

As people became more interested in discovering the causes of homosexuality, medicine and psychiatry began competing with the law and religion for jurisdiction. In the beginning of the 19th century, people began studying homosexuality scientifically. At this time, most theories regarded homosexuality as a disease, which had a great influence on how it was viewed culturally. There was a paradigm shift in the mid 20th century in psychiatric science in regards to theories of homosexuality. Psychiatrists began to believe homosexuality could be cured through therapy and freedom of self, and other theories about the genetic and hormonal origin of homosexuality were becoming accepted. There were variations of how homosexuality was viewed as pathological. Some early psychiatrists such as Sigmund Freud and Havelock Ellis adopted more tolerant stances on homosexuality. Freud and Ellis believed that homosexuality was not normal, but was "unavoidable" for some people. Alfred Kinsey's research and publications about homosexuality began the social and cultural shift away from viewing homosexuality as an abnormal condition. These shifting viewpoints in the psychological studies of homosexuality are evident in its placement in the first version of the Diagnostic Statistical Manual (DSM) in 1952, and subsequent change in 1973, in which the diagnosis of ego-dystonic homosexuality replaced the DSM-II category of "sexual orientation disturbance". However, it was not until 1987 in DSM-III-R that it was entirely dropped as a mental disorder.

A 2016 survey of the European Union Agency for Fundamental Rights found that many medical professionals in countries such as Bulgaria, Hungary, Italy, Latvia, Poland, Romania and Slovakia believe that homosexuality is a disease and that such interpretations continue to exist in professional materials. This goes against Council of Europe Recommendation 2010(5) which recommends that homosexuality not be treated as a disease. As of 2018, homosexuality was popularly considered a disease in Lebanon.

=== Freud and psychoanalysis ===
Sigmund Freud's views on homosexuality were complex. In his attempts to understand the causes and development of homosexuality, he first explained bisexuality as an "original libido endowment", by which he meant that all humans are born bisexual. He believed that the libido has a homosexual portion and a heterosexual portion, and through the course of development one wins out over the other.

Some other causes of homosexuality for which he advocated included an inverted Oedipus complex where individuals begin to identify with their mother and take themselves as a love object. This love of one's self is defined as narcissism, and Freud thought that people who were high in the trait of narcissism would be more likely to develop homosexuality because loving the same sex is like an extension of loving oneself.

Freud believed treatment of homosexuality was not successful because the individual does not want to give up their homosexual identity because it brings them pleasure. He used psychoanalysis and hypnotic suggestion as treatments, but showed little success. It was through this that Freud arrived at the conclusion that homosexuality was "nothing to be ashamed of, no vice, no degradation, it cannot be classified as an illness, but a variation of sexual function". He further stated that psychoanalysts "should not promise to abolish homosexuality and make normal heterosexuality take its place", as he had concluded in his own practice that attempts to change homosexual orientations were likely to be unsuccessful. While Freud himself may have come to a more accepting view of homosexuality, his legacy in the field of psychoanalysis, especially in the United States, viewed homosexuality as negative, abnormal and caused by family and developmental issues. It was these views that significantly impacted the rationale for putting homosexuality in the first and second publications of the American Psychiatric Association's DSM, conceptualizing it as a mental disorder and further stigmatizing homosexuality in society.

=== Havelock Ellis ===
Havelock Ellis (1859–1939) was working as a teacher in Australia, when he had a revelation that he wanted to dedicate his life to exploring the issue of sexuality. He returned to London in 1879 and enrolled in St. Thomas's Hospital Medical School. He began to write, and in 1896 he co-authored Sexual Inversion with John Addington Symonds. The book was first published in German, and a year later it was translated into English. Their book explored homosexual relationships, and in a progressive approach for their time they refused to criminalize or pathologize the acts and emotions that were present in homosexual relationships.

Ellis disagreed with Freud on a few points regarding homosexuality, especially regarding its development. He argued that homosexuals do not have a clear cut Oedipus complex but they do have strong feelings of inadequacy, born of fears of failure, and may also be afraid of relations with women. Ellis argued that the restrictions of society contributed to the development of same-sex love. He believed that homosexuality is not something people are born with, but that at some point humans are all sexually indiscriminate, and then narrow down and choose which sex acts to stick with. According to Ellis, some people choose to engage in homosexuality, while others will choose heterosexuality. He proposed that being "exclusively homosexual" is to be deviant because the person is a member of a minority and therefore statistically unusual, but that society should accept that deviations from the "normal" were harmless, and maybe even valuable. Ellis believed that psychological problems arose not from homosexual acts alone, but when someone "psychologically harms himself by fearfully limiting his own sex behavior".

Ellis is often credited with coining the term homosexuality but in reality he despised the word because it conflated Latin and Greek roots and instead used the term invert in his published works. Soon after Sexual Inversion was published in England, it was banned as lewd and scandalous. Ellis argued that homosexuality was a characteristic of a minority, and was not acquired or a vice and was not curable. He advocated changing the laws to leave those who chose to practice homosexuality at peace, because at the time it was a punishable crime. He believed societal reform could occur, but only after the public was educated. His book became a landmark in the understanding of homosexuality.

=== Alfred Kinsey ===
Alfred Charles Kinsey (1894–1956) was a sexologist who founded the Institute for Sex Research, which is now known as the Kinsey Institute for Research in Sex, Gender and Reproduction. His explorations into different sexual practices originated from his study of the variations in mating practices among wasps. He developed the Kinsey Scale, which measures sexual orientation in ranges from 0 to 6 with 0 being exclusively heterosexual and 6 being exclusively homosexual. His findings indicated that there was great variability in sexual orientations. Kinsey published the books Sexual Behavior in the Human Male and Sexual Behavior in the Human Female, which brought him both fame and controversy. The prevailing approach to homosexuality at the time was to pathologize and attempt to change homosexuals. Kinsey's book demonstrated that homosexuality was more common than was assumed, suggesting that these behaviors are normal and part of a continuum of sexual behaviors.

=== The Diagnostic and Statistical Manual ===
The social, medical, and legal approach to homosexuality ultimately led to its inclusion in the first and second publications of the American Psychiatric Association's Diagnostic and Statistical Manual (DSM). This served to conceptualize homosexuality as a mental disorder and further stigmatize homosexuality in society. However, the evolution in scientific study and empirical data from Kinsey, Evelyn Hooker, and others confronted these beliefs, and by the 1970s psychiatrists and psychologists were radically altering their views on homosexuality. Tests such as the Rorschach, Thematic Apperception Test (TAT), and the Minnesota Multiphasic Personality Inventory (MMPI) indicated that homosexual men and women were not distinguishable from heterosexual men and women in functioning. These studies failed to support the previous assumptions that family dynamics, trauma, and gender identity were factors in the development of sexual orientation. Many psychologists have differing opinions about same-sex relationships. Some think that it is not healthy at all, some support it, and some cannot support it because of their own personal religious beliefs. Due to lack of supporting data, as well as exponentially increasing pressure from gay rights advocates, the board of directors for the American Psychiatric Association voted to declassify homosexuality as a mental disorder from the DSM-II in 1973, but the DSM retained a diagnosis that could be used for distress due to one's sexual orientation until the DSM-5 (2013).

== Major areas of psychological research ==
Major psychological research into homosexuality is divided into five categories:

1. What causes some people to be attracted to his or her own sex?
2. What causes discrimination against people with a homosexual orientation and how can this be influenced?
3. Does having a homosexual orientation affect one's health status, psychological functioning or general well-being?
4. What determines successful adaptation to rejecting social climates? Why is homosexuality central to the identity of some people, but peripheral to the identity of others?
5. How do the children of homosexual people develop?

Psychological research in these areas has always been important to counteracting prejudicial attitudes and actions, and to the gay and lesbian rights movement generally.

=== Causes of homosexuality ===
Although no single theory on the cause of sexual orientation has yet gained widespread support, scientists favor biologically based theories. There is considerably more evidence supporting nonsocial, biological causes of sexual orientation than social ones, especially for males.

=== Discrimination ===
Anti-gay attitudes and behaviors (sometimes called homophobia or heterosexism) have been objects of psychological research. Such research usually focuses on attitudes hostile to gay men, rather than attitudes hostile to lesbians. Anti-gay attitudes are often found in those who do not know gay people on a personal basis. There is also a high risk for anti-gay bias in psychotherapy with lesbian, gay, and bisexual clients. One study found that nearly half of its sample had been the victim of verbal or physical violence because of their sexual orientation, usually committed by men. Such victimization is related to higher levels of depression, anxiety, anger, and symptoms of post-traumatic stress. Through the 2015 U.S. Transgender Survey, which was conducted by the National Center for Transgender Equality, transgender people of color were found to face disproportionate discrimination because of their overlapping identities. These forms of discrimination included violence, unreasonable unemployment, unfair policing, and unfair medical treatment.

Research suggests that parents who respond negatively to their child's sexual orientation tended to have lower self-esteem and negative attitudes toward women, and that "negative feelings about homosexuality in parents - decreased the longer they were aware of their child's homosexuality".

In addition, while research has suggested that "families with a strong emphasis on traditional values implying the importance of religion, an emphasis on marriage and having children – were less accepting of homosexuality than were low-tradition families", emerging research suggests that this may not be universal. For example, recent research published in APA's Psychology of Religion & Spirituality journal by Chana Etengoff and Colette Daiute suggests that religious family members can alternatively use religious values and texts in support of their sexual minority relative. For example, a Catholic mother of a gay man shared that she focuses on "the greatest commandment of all, which is, love". Similarly, a Methodist mother referenced Jesus in her discussion of loving her gay son, as she said, "I look at Jesus' message of love and forgiveness and that we're friends by the blood, that I don't feel that people are condemned by the actions they have done." These religious values were similarly expressed by a father who is a member of the Church of Jesus Christ of Latter-day Saints who shared the following during his discussion of the biblical prohibition against homosexuality: "Your goal, your reason for being, should be to accept and to love and to lift up ... those in need no matter who they are".

=== Mental health issues ===
Psychological research in this area includes examining mental health issues (including stress, depression, or addictive behavior) faced by gay and lesbian people as a result of the difficulties they experience because of their sexual orientation, physical appearance issues, eating disorders, or gender atypical behavior.

- Psychiatric disorders: in a Dutch study, gay men reported significantly higher rates of mood and anxiety disorders than straight men, and lesbians were significantly more likely to experience depression (but not other mood or anxiety disorders) than straight women. A research paper from the American Journal of Community Psychology states that individuals who face multiple forms of oppression tend to find their hardships more difficult to manage. In this study, it is noted that LGBTQ+ people who are disabled have reported struggling more with their oppressed statuses.
- Physical appearance and eating disorders: gay men tend to be more concerned about their physical appearance than straight men. Lesbian women are at a lower risk for eating disorders than heterosexual women.
- Gender atypical behavior: while this is not a disorder, gay men may face difficulties due to being more likely to display gender atypical behavior than heterosexual men. The difference is less pronounced between lesbians and straight women.
- Minority stress: stress caused from a sexual stigma, manifested as prejudice and discrimination, is a major source of stress for people with a homosexual orientation. Sexual-minority affirming groups and gay peer groups help counteract and buffer minority stress.
- Ego-dystonic sexual orientation: conflict between religious identity and sexual orientation can cause severe stress, causing some people to want to change their sexual orientation. Sexual orientation identity exploration can help individuals evaluate the reasons behind the desire to change and help them resolve the conflict between their religious and sexual identity, either through sexual orientation identity reconstruction or affirmation therapies. Ego-dystonic sexual orientation is a disorder where a person wishes their sexual orientation were different because of associated psychological and behavioral disorders.
- Sexual relationship disorder: people with a homosexual orientation in mixed-orientation marriages may struggle with the fear of the loss of their marriage. Sexual relationship disorder is a disorder where the gender identity or sexual orientation of one of the partners interferes with maintaining or forming of a relationship.

==== Suicide ====
The likelihood of suicide attempts is higher in both gay males and lesbians, as well as bisexual individuals of both sexes, when compared to their heterosexual counterparts. The trend of having a higher incident rate among females encompasses lesbians or bisexual females; when compared with homosexual or bisexual males, lesbians are more likely to attempt suicide. This is likely because of discrimination or in homosexuals, embarrassment of their feelings. At age 11 or 12, if you have feelings toward both or the same gender, this is the age you start to realize it.

Studies dispute the exact difference in suicide rate compared to heterosexuals with a minimum of 0.8–1.1 times more likely for females and 1.5–2.5 times more likely for males. The higher figures reach 4.6 times more likely in females and 14.6 times more likely in males.

Race and age play a factor in the increased risk. The highest ratios for males are attributed to young Caucasians. By the age of 25, their risk is more than halved; however, the risk for black gay males at that age steadily increases to 8.6 times more likely. Over a lifetime, the increased likelihoods are 5.7 times for white and 12.8 for black gay and bisexual males. Lesbian and bisexual females have the opposite trend, with fewer attempts during the teenager years compared to heterosexual females. Through a lifetime, the likelihood for Caucasian females is nearly triple that of their heterosexual counterparts; however, for black females there is minimal change (less than 0.1 to 0.3 difference), with heterosexual black females having a slightly higher risk throughout most of the age-based study.

Gay and lesbian youth who attempt suicide are disproportionately subject to anti-gay attitudes, often have fewer skills for coping with discrimination, isolation, and loneliness, and were more likely to experience family rejection than those who do not attempt suicide. Another study found that gay and bisexual youth who attempted suicide had more feminine gender roles, adopted a non-heterosexual identity at a young age and were more likely than peers to report sexual abuse, drug abuse, and arrests for misconduct. One study found that same-sex sexual behavior, but not homosexual attraction or homosexual identity, was significantly predictive of suicide among Norwegian adolescents.

Government policies have been found to mediate this relationship by legislating structural stigma. One study using cross-country data from 1991 to 2017 for 36 OECD countries established that same-sex marriage legalization is associated with a decline in youth suicide of 1.191 deaths per 100,000 youth, with the impact more pronounced for male youth relative to female youth. Another study of nationwide data from across the United States from January 1999 to December 2015 revealed that same-sex marriage is associated with a significant reduction in the rate of attempted suicide among children, with the effect being concentrated among children of a minority sexual orientation, resulting in about 134,000 fewer children attempting suicide each year in the United States.

=== Sexual orientation identity development ===
- Coming out: many gay, lesbian and bisexual people go through a "coming out" experience at some point in their lives. Psychologists often say this process includes several stages "in which there is an awareness of being different from peers ('sensitization'), and in which people start to question their sexual identity ('identity confusion'). Subsequently, they start to explore practically the option of being gay, lesbian or bisexual and learn to deal with the stigma ('identity assumption'). In the final stage, they integrate their sexual desires into a positive understanding of self ('commitment')." However, the process is not always linear and it may differ for lesbians, gay men and bisexual individuals.
- Different degrees of coming out: one study found that gay men are more likely to be out to friends and siblings than to co-workers, parents, and more distant relatives.
- Coming out and well-being: same-sex couples who are openly gay are more satisfied in their relationships. For women who self-identify as lesbian, the more people know about her sexual orientation, the less anxiety, more positive affectivity, and greater self-esteem she has.
- Rejection of gay identity: various studies report that for some religious people, rejecting a gay identity appears to relieve the distress caused by conflicts between religious values and sexual orientation. After reviewing the research, Judith Glassgold, chair of the American Psychological Association sexuality task force, said some people are content in denying a gay identity and "there is no clear evidence of harm".

=== Fluidity of sexual orientation ===
Often, sexual orientation and sexual orientation identity are not distinguished, which can impact accurately assessing sexual identity and whether or not sexual orientation is able to change; sexual orientation identity can change throughout an individual's life, and may or may not align with biological sex, sexual behavior or actual sexual orientation. Sexual orientation is stable and unlikely to change for the vast majority of people, but some research indicates that some people may experience change in their sexual orientation, and this is more likely for women than for men. The American Psychological Association distinguishes between sexual orientation (an innate attraction) and sexual orientation identity (which may change at any point in a person's life).

In a statement issued jointly with other major American medical organizations, the American Psychological Association states that "different people realize at different points in their lives that they are heterosexual, gay, lesbian, or bisexual". A 2007 report from the Centre for Addiction and Mental Health states that, "For some people, sexual orientation is continuous and fixed throughout their lives. For others, sexual orientation may be fluid and change over time". Lisa Diamond's study "Female bisexuality from adolescence to adulthood" suggests that there is "considerable fluidity in bisexual, unlabeled, and lesbian women's attractions, behaviors, and identities".

=== Parenting ===
LGBT parenting is the parenting of children by lesbian, gay, bisexual, and transgender (LGBT) people, as either biological or non-biological parents. Gay men have options which include "foster care, variations of domestic and international adoption, diverse forms of surrogacy (whether "traditional" or gestational), and kinship arrangements, wherein they might coparent with a woman or women with whom they are intimately but not sexually involved". LGBT parents can also include single parents; to a lesser extent, the term sometimes refers to parents of LGBT children.

In the 2000 U.S. census, 33% of female same-sex couple households and 22% of male same-sex couple households reported at least one child under eighteen living in their home. Some children do not know they have an LGBT parent; coming out issues vary and some parents may never come out to their children. Adoption by LGBT couples and LGBT parenting in general may be controversial in some countries. In January 2008, the European Court of Human Rights ruled that same-sex couples have the right to adopt a child. In the U.S., LGBT people can legally adopt, as individuals, in all fifty states.

Although it is sometimes asserted in policy debates that heterosexual couples are inherently better parents than same-sex couples, or that the children of lesbian or gay parents fare worse than children raised by heterosexual parents, those assertions are not supported by scientific research literature. There is ample evidence to show that children raised by same-gender parents fare as well as those raised by heterosexual parents. Much research has documented the lack of correlation between parents' sexual orientation and any measure of a child's emotional, psychosocial, and behavioral adjustment. These data have demonstrated no risk to children as a result of growing up in a family with one or more gay parents. No research supports the widely held conviction that the gender of parents influences the well-being of the child. If gay, lesbian, or bisexual parents were inherently less capable than otherwise comparable heterosexual parents, their children would present more poorly regardless of the type of sample; this pattern has not been observed.

Professor Judith Stacey of New York University, stated: "Rarely is there as much consensus in any area of social science as in the case of gay parenting, which is why the American Academy of Pediatrics and all of the major professional organizations with expertise in child welfare have issued reports and resolutions in support of gay and lesbian parental rights". These organizations include the American Academy of Pediatrics, the American Academy of Child and Adolescent Psychiatry, the American Psychiatric Association, the American Psychological Association, the American Psychoanalytic Association, the National Association of Social Workers, the Child Welfare League of America, the North American Council on Adoptable Children, and the Canadian Psychological Association (CPA). The CPA is concerned that some persons and institutions are misinterpreting the findings of psychological research to support their positions, when their positions are more accurately based on other systems of belief or values.

The vast majority of families in the United States today are not the "middle-class family with a bread-winning father and a stay-at-home mother, married to each other and raising their biological children" that has been viewed as the norm. Since the end of the 1980s, it has been well established that children and adolescents can adjust just as well in nontraditional settings as in traditional settings.

== Psychotherapy ==
Most people with a homosexual orientation who seek psychotherapy do so for the same reasons as straight people (stress, relationship difficulties, difficulty adjusting to social or work situations, etc.); their sexual orientation may be of primary, incidental, or no importance to their issues and treatment. Regardless of the issue for which psychotherapy is sought, there is a high risk of anti-gay bias being directed at non-heterosexual clients.

=== Relationship counseling ===
Most relationship issues are shared equally among couples regardless of sexual orientation, but LGBT clients additionally have to deal with homophobia, heterosexism, and other societal oppressions. Individuals may also be at different stages in the coming out process. Often, same-sex couples do not have as many role models for successful relationships as opposite-sex couples. There may be issues with gender-role socialization that does not affect opposite-sex couples.

A significant number of men and women experience conflict surrounding homosexual expression within a mixed-orientation marriage. Therapy may include helping the client feel more comfortable and accepting of same-sex feelings and to explore ways of incorporating same-sex and opposite-sex feelings into life patterns. Although a strong homosexual identity was associated with difficulties in marital satisfaction, viewing the same-sex activities as compulsive facilitated commitment to the marriage and to monogamy.

=== Gay affirmative psychotherapy ===
Gay affirmative psychotherapy is a form of psychotherapy for gay, lesbian, and bisexual clients which encourages them to accept their sexual orientation, and does not attempt to change their sexual orientation to heterosexual, or to eliminate or diminish their same-sex desires and behaviors. The American Psychological Association (APA) and the British Psychological Society offer guidelines and materials for gay affirmative psychotherapy. Practitioners of gay affirmative psychotherapy state that homosexuality or bisexuality is not a mental illness, and that embracing and affirming gay identity can be a key component to recovery from other mental illnesses or substance abuse. Some people may find neither gay affirmative therapy nor conversion therapy appropriate, however. Clients whose religious beliefs are inconsistent with homosexual behavior may require some other method of integrating their conflicting religious and sexual selves.

=== Sexual orientation identity exploration ===
The American Psychological Association recommends that if a client wants treatment to change their sexual orientation, the therapist should explore the reasons behind the desire, without favoring any particular outcome. The therapist should neither promote nor reject the idea of celibacy, but help the client come to their own decisions by evaluating the reasons behind the patient's goals. One example of sexual orientation identity exploration is sexual identity therapy.

After exploration, a patient may proceed with sexual orientation identity reconstruction, which helps a patient reconstruct sexual orientation identity. Psychotherapy, support groups, and life events can influence identity development; similarly, self-awareness, self-conception, and identity may evolve during treatment. It can change sexual orientation identity (private and public identification, and group belonging), emotional adjustment (self-stigma and shame reduction), and personal beliefs, values and norms (change of religious and moral belief, behavior and motivation). Some therapies include "gender wholeness therapy".

The American Psychiatric Association states in their official statement release on the matter: "The potential risks of 'reparative therapy' are great and include depression, anxiety, and self-destructive behavior, since therapist alignment with societal prejudices against homosexuality may reinforce self-hatred already experienced by the patient. Many patients who have undergone 'reparative therapy' relate that they were inaccurately told that homosexuals are lonely, unhappy individuals who never achieve acceptance or satisfaction. The possibility that the person might achieve happiness and satisfying interpersonal relationships as a gay man or lesbian are not presented, nor are alternative approaches to dealing with the effects of societal stigmatization discussed. APA recognizes that in the course of ongoing psychiatric treatment, there may be appropriate clinical indications for attempting to change sexual behaviors."

The American Psychological Association aligns with this in a resolution: it "urges all mental health professionals to take the lead in removing the stigma of mental illness that has long been associated with homosexual orientation" and "Therefore be it further resolved that the American Psychological Association opposes portrayals of lesbian, gay, and bisexual youth and adults as mentally ill due to their sexual orientation and supports the dissemination of accurate information about sexual orientation, and mental health, and appropriate interventions in order to counteract bias that is based in ignorance or unfounded beliefs about sexual orientation."

The American Academy of Pediatrics advises lesbian, gay, gynandromorphophilic, and bisexual teenagers struggling with their sexuality: "Homosexuality is not a mental disorder. All of the major medical organizations, including The American Psychiatric Association, The American Psychological Association, and the American Academy of Pediatrics agree that homosexuality is not an illness or disorder, but a form of sexual expression. No one knows what causes a person to be gay, bisexual, or straight. There probably are a number of factors. Some may be biological. Others may be psychological. The reasons can vary from one person to another. The fact is, you do not choose to be gay, bisexual, or straight."

== Developments in individual psychology ==
In contemporary Adlerian thought, homosexuals are not considered within the problematic discourse of the "failures of life". Christopher Shelley, an Adlerian psychotherapist, published a volume of essays in 1998 that feature Freudian, (post)Jungian and Adlerian contributions that demonstrate affirmative shifts in the depth psychologies. These shifts show how depth psychology can be utilized to support rather than pathologize gay and lesbian psychotherapy clients. The Journal of Individual Psychology, the English language flagship publication of Adlerian psychology, released a volume in the summer of 2008 that reviews and corrects Adler's previously held beliefs on the homosexual community.

== See also ==
- Association of Gay and Lesbian Psychiatrists
- Conversion therapy
- Disability and LGBT identities
- Ego-dystonic sexual orientation
- Homosexuality in DSM
- Minority stress
- Timeline of sexual orientation and medicine
- Neuroqueer theory
- LGBTQ psychology
