= Gay affirmative psychotherapy =

Alternative for conversion therapy

Gay affirmative psychotherapy is a form of psychotherapy for non-heterosexual people, specifically gay and lesbian clients, which focuses on client comfort in working towards authenticity and self-acceptance regarding sexual orientation, and does not attempt to "change" them to heterosexual, or to "eliminate or diminish" same-sex "desires and behaviors". The American Psychological Association (APA) offers guidelines and materials for gay affirmative psychotherapy. Affirmative psychotherapy affirms that homosexuality or bisexuality is not a mental disorder, in accordance with global scientific consensus. In fact, embracing and affirming gay identity can be a key component to recovery from other mental illnesses or substance abuse. Clients whose religious beliefs are interpreted as teaching against homosexual behavior may require some other method of integration of their possibly conflicting religious and sexual selves.

== Guidelines ==
For many years, psychiatry viewed homosexuality as a mental illness. Current guidelines instead encourage psychotherapists to assist patients in overcoming the stigma of homosexuality rather than try to change their sexual orientation.

Because some mental health professionals are unfamiliar with the social difficulties of the coming out process, particular to other factors such as age, race, ethnicity, or religious affiliation, they are encouraged by the APA to learn more about how gay, lesbian, and bisexual clients face discrimination in its various forms. Many LGBTQ people are rejected from their own families and form their own familial relationships and support systems that may also be unfamiliar to mental health professionals, who are encouraged to take into account the diversity of extended relationships in lieu of family. In gay affirmative psychotherapy, psychologists are encouraged to recognize how their attitudes and knowledge about homosexual and bisexual issues may be relevant to assessment and treatment and seek consultation or make appropriate referrals when indicated. Psychologists strive to understand the ways in which social stigmatization (i.e., prejudice, discrimination, and violence) poses risks to the mental health and well-being of homosexual and bisexual clients. Psychologists strive to understand how inaccurate or prejudicial views of homosexuality or bisexuality may affect the client's presentation in treatment and the therapeutic process.

== Research ==
The term "gay affirmative therapy" was coined and defined by Alan K. Malyon in 1982 as therapy that challenges the pathological view of homosexuality and has the therapist develop knowledge on gay-specific issues to better treat gay clients. This was five years before ego-dystonic homosexuality was removed from the DSM. This model works to consider the effects of sexuality-based oppression and discrimination on gay individuals' and couples' mental health and affirm individuals in their sexuality-specific experiences.

=== Religious considerations ===
One of the emerging areas of research regarding gay affirmative psychotherapy is related to the process of assisting LGBTQ individuals from religious backgrounds feel comfortable with their sexual and gender orientation. Narrative analyses of clinicians' reports regarding gay affirmative psychotherapy suggest that the majority of conflicts discussed within the therapeutic context by gay men and their relatives from religious backgrounds are related to the interaction between family, self, and religion. Clinicians report that gay men and their families struggle more frequently with the institution, community, and practices of religion rather than directly with God. Chana Etengoff and Colette Daiute report in the Journal of Homosexuality that clinicians most frequently address these tensions by emphasizing the mediational strategies of increasing self-awareness, seeking secular support (e.g., PFLAG), and increasing positive communication between family members.

For some clients, acting on same-sex attraction may not be a fulfilling solution as it may conflict with their religious beliefs; licensed mental health providers may approach such a situation by neither rejecting nor promoting celibacy. Douglas Haldeman has argued that for individuals who seek therapy because of frustration surrounding "seemingly irreconcilable internal differences" between "their sexual and religious selves ... neither a gay-affirmative nor a conversion therapy approach [may be] indicated", and that "[just as] therapists in the religious world [should] refrain from pathologizing their LGB clients ... so, too, should gay-affirmative practitioners refrain from overtly or subtly devaluing those who espouse conservative religious identities." Data suggest that clients generally judge therapists who do not respect religiously-based identity outcomes to be unhelpful.

=== Youth and families ===
In recent years gay affirmative therapy has been adapted for youth populations who are struggling with their sexuality. Research has shown that sexual minority children and adolescents are more likely to develop depression, anxiety, substance use disorders, and attempt suicide. Affirmation of one's sexual orientation and experiences has shown to be effective in treating related mental health concerns. Cognitive behavioral therapy has the most supportive evidence for treating general LGBTQ+ populations and has been extended to youth populations as well. It is currently considered by some psychologists as the best evidence-based practice for working with sexual minority youth.

There is currently little research on affirmative interventions for families, and most research focuses on lesbian, gay, and bisexual individuals becoming parents, with implications that transition to parenting training might be beneficial for sexual minority parents. Little research has been done on family therapy for sexual minority youth and family support.

== German government action ==
In March 2008, the German federal government (CDU/SPD) summarized the professional consensus as indicating that homosexuality is not an illness, and that conversion therapy is dangerous and does not help homosexual people. Voluntary changes to sexual orientation are not an option, according to the administration's answer to parliamentary questioning, as these attempts may cause personal harm. The German government also made the point that gay affirmative psychotherapy can help clients.

== Literature ==
- Adelman, M. (1990). Stigma, gay lifestyles, and adjustment to aging: A study of later-life gay men and lesbians. Journal of Homosexuality, 20(3–4), 7–32.
- Allen, M., & Burrell, N. (1996). Comparing the impact of homosexual and heterosexual parents on children: Meta-analysis of existing research. Journal of Homosexuality, 32(2), 19–35.
- Allison, K., Crawford, I., Echemendia, R., Robinson, L., Knepp, D. (1994). Human diversity and professional competence: Training in clinical and counseling psychology revisited. ..American Psychologist.., 49, 792–796.
- American Psychological Association. (1998). Appropriate therapeutic responses to sexual orientation in the proceedings of the American Psychological Association, Incorporated, for the legislative year 1997. American Psychologist, 53(8), 882–939.
- Browning, C. (1987). Therapeutic issues and intervention strategies with young adult lesbian clients: A developmental approach. Journal of Homosexuality, 14(1/2), 45–52.
- Buhrke, R. (1989). Female student perspectives on training in lesbian and gay issues. Counseling Psychologist, 17, 629–636.
- Cabaj, R., & Klinger, R. (1996). Psychotherapeutic interventions with lesbian and gay couples. In R. Cabaj & T. Stein (Eds.), Textbook of homosexuality and mental health (pp. 485–502). Washington, DC: American Psychiatric Press.
- Canadian Psychological Association. (1995). Canadian code of ethics for psychologists. [On-line]. Available: http://www.cycor.ca/Psych/ethics/html%5B%5D
- Cornett, C. (1993). Affirmative Dynamic Psychotherapy With Gay Men. New York: Jason Aronson Press. ISBN 978-1-56821-001-8
- Etengoff, Chana; Daiute, Colette (2015). "Clinicians' Perspective of the Relational Processes for Family and Individual Development During the Mediation of Religious and Sexual Identity Disclosure". Journal of Homosexuality. 62 (3): 394–426. doi:10.1080/00918369.2014.977115. PMID 25364980. S2CID 10971273.
- Richard Isay, (1993). Schwul sein. Die psychologische Entwicklung des Homosexuellen. München: Piper. ISBN 3-492-11683-3 (Original 1989: Being homosexual. Gay men and their development. New York: Farrar, Straus, and Giroux.)
- Journal of Gay & Lesbian Psychotherapy, Homosexuality and Psychoanalysis revisited, 2002, 6. ed., Nr. 1
- Lebolt, J. (1999). Gay affirmative psychotherapy: A phenomenological study. Clinical Social Work, 27 (4), 355–370.
- Pachankis, J. E., & Goldfried, M. R. (2004). Clinical issues in working with lesbian, gay, and bisexual clients. Psychotherapy: Theory, Research, Practice, and Training, 41, 227–246.
- Udo Rauchfleisch, (2002). Gleich und doch anders: Psychotherapie und Beratung von Lesben, Schwulen, Bisexuellen und ihren Angehörigen. Stuttgart: Klett-Cotta. ISBN 3-608-94236-X
- Kathleen Ritter and Anthony Terndrup, (2002). Handbook of Affirmative Psychotherapy with Lesbians and Gay Men. New York: Guilford. ISBN 1-57230-714-5
