= Association of LGBTQ Psychiatrists =

LGBT advocacy group in the United States

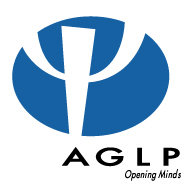
Association of Gay and Lesbian Psychiatrists logo

The Association of LGBTQ Psychiatrists, originally the Association of Gay and Lesbian Psychiatrists (AGLP), is an organization that educates and advocates on lesbian, gay, bisexual, and transgender (LGBTQ) mental health issues.

== History ==
The organization informally began in the late 1960s, when lesbian and gay members of the American Psychiatric Association (APA) met during its annual conferences. Following the APA's declassification of homosexuality as a mental disorder in 1973, the Caucus of Gay, Lesbian, and Bisexual Members of the American Psychiatric Association was officially founded. A primary function of the caucus was to advocate to the APA on LGBT mental health issues. The Association of Gay and Lesbian Psychiatrists grew out of the caucus, and was founded in 1985. The group changed its name in 2015, but continues to be known as "AGLP".

== Activities ==
The AGLP's stated purposes include:

- Publishing a quarterly newsletter and the Journal of Gay and Lesbian Psychotherapy
- Seminars and discussion groups concurrent with the annual meeting of the APA
- Working within the APA on behalf of the LGBT community
- Collaborating with other organizations of LGBT physicians and other minority and advocacy groups
- Referral services for LGBT patients
- Assisting medical students and residents in their professional development
- Encouraging and facilitating the presentation of programs and publications relevant to LGBT concerns at professional meetings.

== Achievements ==
- In 1978, the Caucus successfully petitioned the APA to create a task force on lesbian and gay issues. That task force has since been elevated to a full standing committee in the APA.
- Since 1982, the organization has been recognized as a representative in the Assembly of the APA, speaking directly on matters of special concern to lesbian and gay members of the APA.
- In 1983, the Caucus successfully petitioned the APA to create a task force on psychiatric aspects of AIDS, which ultimately led to the 1984 publication of two important APA volumes: Innovations in Psychotherapy with Homosexuals and Psychiatric Implications of Acquired Immune Deficiency Syndrome. In 1988, that task force was elevated to a full standing committee in the APA.
- The AGLP was influential in the APA's removal of "ego-dystonic homosexuality" from the DSM in 1987.

== Presidents ==
- Amir Ahuja, M.D. (2020- )
- Howard Rubin, M.D.
- Eric Yarbrough, M.D.
- Kenneth Ashley, M.D.
- Ubaldo Leli, M.D.
- Dan Karasic, M.D.
- Mary Barber, M.D.
- Philip A. Bialer, M.D.
- Daniel W. Hicks, M.D.
- David L. Scasta, M.D.
- Margery Sved, M.D.
- Marshal Forstein, M.D.
- Peggy Hackenbruck, M.D.
- Norman B. Hartstein, M.D.
- Robert Cabaj, M.D.
- Terry Stein, M.D.
- David Kessler, M.D.
- James Krajeski, M.D.
- Stuart Nichols, M.D.
- Frank Rundle, M.D

== See also ==
- List of LGBT medical organizations
