= Ego-dystonic sexual orientation =

Psychiatric diagnosis

Ego-dystonic sexual orientation is a highly controversial mental health diagnosis that was included in the American Psychiatric Association's Diagnostic and Statistical Manual of Mental Disorders (DSM) from 1980 to 1987 (under the name ego-dystonic homosexuality) and in the World Health Organization's (WHO) International Classification of Diseases (ICD) from 1990 to 2019. Individuals could be diagnosed with ego-dystonic sexual orientation if their sexual orientation or attractions were at odds with their idealized self-image, causing anxiety and a desire to change their orientation or become more comfortable with it. It describes not innate sexual orientation itself, but a conflict between the sexual orientation a person wishes to have and their actual sexual orientation.

The addition of ego-dystonic homosexuality to the DSM-III in 1980 constituted a political compromise between those who believed that homosexuality was a pathological condition and those who believed it was a normal variant of sexuality. Under pressure from members of the psychiatry and psychology fields and mounting scientific evidence that the desire to be heterosexual is a common phase in a gay (including lesbian) or bisexual person's identity development rather than an indication of mental illness, the diagnosis was removed seven years later, but ego-dystonic sexual orientation was added to the ICD-10 in 1990. Leading up to the publication of the ICD-11, a WHO-appointed working group recommended its deletion, due to a lack of clinical utility, a lack of usefulness in public health data, and the potential for negative consequences. The ICD-11, which was approved in 2019 and went into effect in January 2022, does not include any diagnostic categories that can be applied to people on the basis of same gender attraction, bringing the ICD in line with the DSM-5. Both the ICD-11 and DSM-5 do however continue to list diagnoses relating to low or absent sexual desire, interest or motivation, allowing for the continued medicalization of asexuality.

The diagnostic categories of ego-dystonic homosexuality and ego-dystonic sexual orientation legitimized controversial sexual orientation change efforts, most notably the practice of conversion therapy, even as such practices were being increasingly scientifically debunked. After an extensive review of the research literature, the WHO working group concluded that there are no evidence-based treatments for ego-dystonic sexual orientation, and individuals who exhibit distress or concern over their sexual orientation do not require any unique therapeutic interventions other than common treatments for distress, anxiety, depression, and other conditions.

== History of the diagnosis ==
Ego-dystonic homosexuality was first introduced as a mental health diagnosis in 1980 with the publication of the DSM-III. It was removed from the DSM-III-R in 1987. Ego-dystonic sexual orientation was introduced in the ICD-10 in 1990, and was removed from the ICD-11 in 2019.

The decision to include ego-dystonic homosexuality in the DSM-III came after years of debate and controversy between two competing schools of thought within the psychiatry field: the view that homosexuality was a pathological condition and the view that homosexuality was a normal variation of sexuality. Scientific evidence increasingly challenged the assumption that homosexuality was a disorder, yet many within the psychiatry field adamantly believed it was.

=== Sexual orientation disturbance ===
In 1973, after extensive organizing by gay rights activists, a compromise had been reached of removing homosexuality from the DSM and replacing it with "sexual orientation disturbance," a diagnostic category that could be applied to people with same-sex attractions "who are either disturbed by, in conflict with, or wish to change their sexual orientation. The American Psychiatric Association's (APA) board of trustees voted unanimously in December 1973 in favor of this compromise, and in 1974 the seventh printing of the DSM-II in 1974 included "sexual orientation disturbance" in place of "homosexuality" and a note that homosexuality "by itself does not constitute a psychiatric disorder."

=== DSM-III ===
That same year, a task force was appointed to develop the DSM-III, led by Robert Spitzer, the psychiatrist who had originally drafted the proposal to replace homosexuality with sexual orientation disturbance. Spitzer felt that it was important to take "a middle position regarding the pathological status of homosexuality"; nine members of the task force agreed with him and five disagreed, leading to a deadlock. Classifications of "homodysphilia," "dyshomophilia," and "homosexual conflict disorder" were discussed, until finally, the invented term "ego-dystonic homosexuality" was proposed, along with a barely perceptible conceptual shift: instead of distress about being homosexual, the new classification was about a desire to be heterosexual and distress at one's inability to achieve that desire. A proposal to include additional information such as a note about how internalized homophobia can be a contributing factor eventually swayed enough critics; others, including Richard Green and Richard Pillard, remained opposed to including homosexuality in the DSM in any form, but they were eventually overruled.

The diagnostic criteria listed in the DSM-III for ego-dystonic homosexuality were:

A. The individual complains that heterosexual arousal is persistently absent or weak and significantly interferes with initiating or maintaining wanted heterosexual relationships. B. There is a sustained pattern of homosexual arousal that the individual explicitly states has been unwanted and a persistent source of distress.

=== Removal from the DSM ===
Leading up to the publication of the DSM-III-R, it had become clear to more and more people that the inclusion of "sexual orientation disturbance" and later "ego-dystonic homosexuality" in the DSM was the result of political compromises rather than scientific evidence, and that neither diagnosis actually met the definition of a disorder. Critics pointed out that by the same logic, short people unhappy with their height could be considered mentally ill.

As the DSM-III revision process neared its completion, a growing number of APA members began advocating for deleting the category of ego-dystonic homosexuality, arguing that it was incompatible with the structure of the manual, had not proved useful in research, represented a "value judgment" that homosexuality was a pathology, and contributed to anti-gay stigma. Terry Stein, a member of APA's Committee on Gay, Lesbian, and Bisexual Issues, noted that there was a "vast amount of psychological, sociological and historical literature that documents the fact that the wish not to have a pattern of homosexual arousal can be a normative stage for many individuals who are developing a gay or lesbian identity" rather than such feelings being indicative of a mental disorder, and further noted that such an erroneous diagnosis could hinder treatment of the distress. Robert Cabaj, president of the Association of Gay and Lesbian Psychiatrists, named how refusal to delete the category could contribute to harmful policies: "With the AIDS crisis and the growing attempts by the military and insurance companies to screen out gay people, the diagnosis has very frightening potential for abuse."

Eventually, a new compromise was reached: ego-dystonic homosexuality would be deleted from the DSM-III-R. In its place, "persistent and marked distress about one's sexual orientation" would be added to the description of the category "sexual disorder not otherwise specified" as an example of the disorders that this category could be used to diagnose. What was notable about this change was that it no longer singled out same-sex attraction as the only form of sexuality that might cause distress worthy of a mental health diagnosis. "Persistent and marked distress about one's sexual orientation" remained in the DSM-IV and DSM-IV-TR but was deleted from the DSM-5 in 2013.

=== Addition to the ICD ===
The ninth edition of the ICD (ICD-9), published in 1975, retained homosexuality as a category of mental disorder under "Sexual Deviations and Disorders," in contrast with the APA's 1973 decision to remove homosexuality from the DSM, and the authors seemingly rationalized this decision by way of a confusingly worded disclaimer in the introduction to the section: "The limits and features of normal sexual inclination and behaviour have not been stated absolutely in different societies and cultures but are broadly such as serve approved social and biological purposes." The description of homosexuality also included the line, "Code homosexuality here whether or not it is considered as a mental disorder," which acknowledged the lack of professional consensus on homosexuality as a mental disorder.

After ego-dystonic homosexuality was removed from the DSM-III-R, the American Psychological Association passed a policy statement, drafted by the Committee on Gay, Lesbian, and Bisexual Issues, that urged its members to not use the diagnoses of homosexuality or ego-dystonic homosexuality listed in the ICD-9, DSM-III, or future editions of either manual. It specifically noted: "the next revision of the ICD is not anticipated to be completed until 1992 and may, according to current proposals, then contain the 'ego-dystonic homosexuality' diagnosis which APA also opposes."

In the process of developing the ICD-10 (which was adopted by the WHO in 1990), the authors decided to delete the category of homosexuality. They initially considered replacing it with three diagnoses: "ego-dystonic sexual orientation associated with heterosexuality", "ego-dystonic sexual orientation associated with homosexuality", and "ego-dystonic sexual orientation associated with bisexuality". Eventually the decision was made to simplify these into one category, "ego-dystonic sexual orientation," which was defined in the ICD-10 as:

The gender identity or sexual preference (heterosexual, homosexual, bisexual, or prepubertal) is not in doubt, but the individual wishes it were different because of associated psychological and behavioural disorders, and may seek treatment in order to change it. (F66.1)

The diagnosis was located within section F66, "psychological and behavioural disorders associated with sexual development and orientation," and the following note was included in that section: "Sexual orientation by itself is not to be regarded as a disorder."

=== Removal from the ICD ===
The World Health Organization was increasingly called on to remove ego-dystonic sexual orientation from the ICD, including by the American Psychological Association, which recommended removing the section of categories related to sexual orientation (part F66), noting that they were "historically rooted in and support continuing unscientific stigmatization of homosexuality by health professions."

As part of the development of the ICD-11, the WHO appointed a Working Group on the Classification of Sexual Disorders and Sexual Health to make recommendations on part F66. In 2014 the working group recommended deletion of part F66 due to a lack of clinical utility, a lack of usefulness in public health data, and the potential for negative consequences, including the risk of these categories lending support to "ineffective and unethical treatment" such as conversion therapy.

In reference to ego-dystonic sexual orientation, the working group noted that although the description of the category includes gender identity and also could theoretically be applied to straight people, "the intent, at least historically, was to address a clinical situation in which individuals express a desire to develop heterosexual attractions they do not feel or to relieve distress about an unwanted homosexual orientation."

The working group named that lesbian, gay, and bisexual people often report higher levels of distress than straight people, but research has shown that this distress is due to higher levels of social rejection and discrimination, and distress that stems from societal stigma cannot be considered a mental disorder. It named that stigma around physical illness and poverty is also likely to cause distress, but this distress is not considered a mental disorder under the ICD. Echoing sentiments voiced 30 years before by Robert Cabaj, the working group also noted that "social and political disapproval has at times resulted in the abuse of diagnoses—especially psychiatric diagnoses—to harass, silence or imprison people whose behaviour violates social norms or challenges existing authority structures."

It concluded, "It is not justifiable from a clinical, public health or research perspective for a diagnostic classification to be based on sexual orientation" and that the needs of lesbian, gay, and bisexual people can be addressed under other diagnostic categories, "in a manner consistent with good clinical practice, existing human rights principles and the mission of WHO."

Following the publication of the working group's report in 2014, it was peer reviewed by a variety of other experts from countries around the world, including some that criminalize homosexuality, and none of them argued against the working group's recommendations. The draft ICD-11 was then extensively field tested in countries including Brazil, India, Lebanon, Mexico, and South Africa, and voted on by ministers of health from more than 170 WHO member countries.

Ultimately, the WHO accepted the working group's recommendations and deleted section F66, including ego-dystonic sexual orientation. The ICD-11, which was approved in 2019 and went into effect in January 2022, does not include any diagnostic categories that can be applied to people on the basis of sexual orientation, bringing the ICD in line with the DSM-5.

=== Inclusion in the CCMD-3 ===
The current Chinese Classification of Mental Disorders (CCMD-3), which is styled after the DSM-IV and ICD-10, includes ego-dystonic sexual orientation, with the note that "a person could be conflicted or suffering from mental illness because of their sexuality, and that condition could be treated." Homosexuality and bisexuality were eliminated from the CCMD in 2001.

== Treatments ==
There are no evidence-based treatments for ego-dystonic sexual orientation. As part of its assessment of the ICD-10's diagnostic categories related to sexual orientation, the World Health Organization's Working Group on the Classification of Sexual Disorders and Sexual Health conducted a thorough literature search and found no evidence that a person's concern about their sexual orientation requires any unique therapeutic interventions other than common treatments for distress, anxiety, depression, and other conditions.

For people who are uncomfortable with or distressed by their sexual orientation or by experiencing same-sex attraction, evidence-based strategies for alleviating distress include "challenging negative stereotypes, seeking social support, and self-acceptance." Supportive interventions include gay affirmative psychotherapy, which helps lesbian, gay, and bisexual people examine and accept their sexual orientation and related sexual relationships, and lesbian, gay, and bisexual support groups, which can help counteract and buffer minority stress, marginalization, and isolation.

The current guidelines of many mental health associations direct therapists to recognize that non-heterosexual orientations are not disorders; to understand the effects of stigma on lesbian, gay, and bisexual people; and to recognize that "sexual orientation change efforts" are ineffective and often harmful. In 2009, an American Psychological Association task force reported that offering appropriate therapeutic interventions to individuals who wish they could change their sexual orientation requires "therapist acceptance, support, and understanding of clients and the facilitation of clients' active coping, social support, and identity exploration and development, without imposing a specific sexual orientation identity outcome."

== Negative impacts of the diagnosis ==
The ego-dystonic sexual orientation diagnostic category legitimized controversial sexual orientation change efforts, most notably the practice of conversion therapy, even as such practices were being increasingly scientifically debunked. In 2009, a research study revealed that 1 in 6 psychological therapists in the UK had helped clients in reducing their feelings of same-sex attraction or attempting to change their sexual orientation at some point in their career. The same year, an American Psychological Association task force conducted a systematic review of all available English-language peer-reviewed research literature on sexual orientation change efforts from 1960 to 2017 and found that such efforts are ineffective and likely to cause harm.

Researchers have noted that even the ongoing existence of conversion therapy is partly due to the legacy of diagnostic criteria that allowed a pathological view of same-sex desire to persist long past the point when the international scientific community had concluded that such desires are a normal variant of human sexuality, and that any ability to diagnose people with a disorder related to their sexual orientation, even if "distress" is the presenting problem, incorrectly implies that in some cases it might be reasonable to help a person attempt to develop heterosexual desires.

As part of its recommendation that ego-dystonic sexual orientation and the other diagnostic categories related to sexual orientation be deleted from the ICD-11, the WHO working group tasked with assessing these categories noted that one of its reasons for this recommendation was the potential for negative consequences if they were retained, naming that use of these categories could lead to "mistakes or delays in accurate diagnosis and treatment" for gay, lesbian, and bisexual people, and that "retention of these categories may also be construed as supporting ineffective and unethical treatment that aims to encourage people with a same-sex orientation to adopt a heterosexual orientation or heterosexual behaviour."

In some countries where homosexuality is criminalized, the medical legacy has been drawn on to help justify harsh penalties for people who engage in same-sex sexual activities. In Uganda, the Member of Parliament who introduced the Anti-Homosexuality Bill of 2009, which called for the death penalty for "serial offenders," quoted psychological research that lacked empirical grounding as part of his justification for the bill. A member of the board of the ex-gay organization Exodus International (which later repudiated its aims, apologized for the harm caused, and folded) attended a Ugandan seminar to show support for the bill.

== Hypoactive sexual desire disorder ==
Critics of hypoactive sexual desire disorder have described it as ego-dystonic asexuality in some cases, pointing out that it pathologizes a lack of sexual desire. This could potentially be described as an example of allonormativity, because the individual may experience distress about not fulfilling the norm of experiencing sexual attraction and this could fulfill the distress condition necessary to being diagnosed with HSDD. Unnecessarily medicating asexual people for HSDD could be described as conversion therapy.

== See also ==
- Conversion therapy
- Gay affirmative psychotherapy
- Gender dysphoria
- Homosexuality and psychology
- Homosexuality in the DSM
- Internalized homophobia
- Minority stress
