= Homophobia =

Negative attitudes towards homosexual people

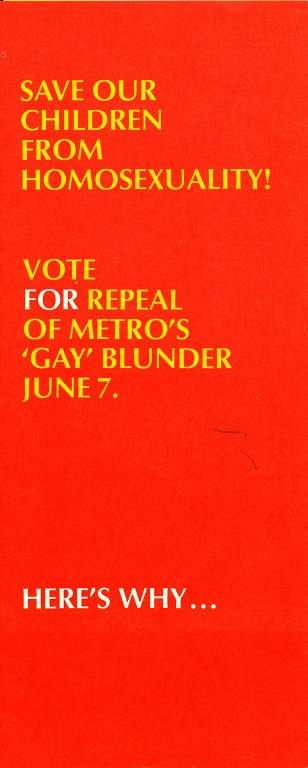
Brochure used by Save Our Children, a political coalition formed in 1977 in Miami, Florida, U.S., to overturn a recently legislated county ordinance that banned discrimination in areas of housing, employment, and public accommodation based on sexual orientation

Homophobia encompasses a range of negative attitudes and feelings toward homosexuality or people who identify or are perceived as being lesbian, gay or bisexual. It has been defined as contempt, prejudice, aversion, hatred, or antipathy, may be based on irrational fear, and may sometimes be attributed to religious beliefs. Homophobia is observable in critical and hostile behavior such as discrimination and violence on the basis of sexual orientations that are non-heterosexual.

Recognized types of homophobia include institutionalized homophobia, e.g. religious homophobia and state-sponsored homophobia, and internalized homophobia, experienced by people who have same-sex attractions, regardless of how they identify. According to 2010 Hate Crimes Statistics released by the FBI National Press Office, 19.3 percent of hate crimes across the United States "were motivated by a sexual orientation bias." Moreover, a Southern Poverty Law Center 2010 Intelligence Report extrapolating data from FBI national hate crime statistics from 1995 to 2008, found that LGBTQ people were "far more likely than any other minority group in the United States to be victimized by violent hate crime."

== Etymology ==
Although prejudice against homosexuality and homosexuals has been recorded since antiquity—first appearing in Ancient Greece and growing notably during the Middle Ages, especially by adherents of Islam and Christianity—the term "homophobia" itself is relatively new. Scholars have used it to describe intolerance towards homosexuality throughout history despite the term's anachronism.

Coined by psychologist George Weinberg in the 1960s, the term homophobia is a portmanteau of (1) the word homosexual, itself a mix of neo-classical morphemes, and (2) phobia from the Greek φόβος phóbos, meaning "fear", "morbid fear" or "aversion". Weinberg is credited as the first person to have used the term in speech. The word homophobia first appeared in print in an article written for the 23 May 1969 edition of the American pornographic magazine Screw, in which the word was used to refer to heterosexual men's fear that others might think they are gay.

Conceptualizing homophobic prejudice as a social problem worthy of scholarly attention was not new. An October 1969 article in Time described examples of negative attitudes toward homosexuality as "homophobia", including "a mixture of revulsion and apprehension" which some called homosexual panic. In 1971, Kenneth Smith used homophobia as a personality profile to describe the psychological aversion to homosexuality. Weinberg also used it this way in his 1972 book Society and the Healthy Homosexual, published one year before the American Psychiatric Association voted to remove homosexuality from its list of mental disorders. Weinberg's term became an important tool for gay and lesbian activists, advocates, and their allies. He describes the concept as a medical phobia:

[A] phobia about homosexuals.... It was a fear of homosexuals which seemed to be associated with a fear of contagion, a fear of reducing the things one fought for — home and family. It was a religious fear and it had led to great brutality as fear always does.

In 1981, homophobia was used for the first time in The Times (of London) to report that the General Synod of the Church of England voted to refuse to condemn homosexuality.

However, when taken literally, homophobia may be a problematic term. Professor David A. F. Haaga says that contemporary usage includes "a wide range of negative emotions, attitudes and behaviours toward homosexual people," which are characteristics that are not consistent with accepted definitions of phobias, that of "an intense, illogical, or abnormal fear of a specified thing."

== Types ==
Homophobia manifests in different forms, and a number of different types have been postulated, among which are internalized homophobia, social homophobia, emotional homophobia, rationalized homophobia, and others. There were also ideas to classify homophobia and other types of bigotry as intolerant personality disorder.

In 1992, the American Psychiatric Association, recognizing the power of the stigma against homosexuality, issued the following statement, reaffirmed by the Board of Trustees in July 2011:

Whereas homosexuality per se implies no impairment in judgment, stability, reliability, or general social or vocational capabilities, the American Psychiatric Association (APA) calls on all international health organizations, psychiatric organizations, and individual psychiatrists in other countries to urge the repeal in their own countries of legislation that penalizes homosexual acts by consenting adults in private. Further, APA calls on these organizations and individuals to do all that is possible to decrease the stigma related to homosexuality wherever and whenever it may occur.

=== Institutional ===
==== Religious attitudes ====
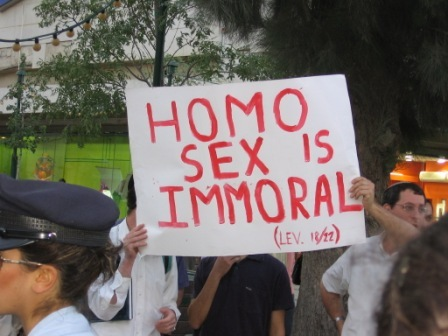
Religious protestors at a pride parade in Jerusalem, with a sign that reads, "Homo sex is immoral (Lev. 18/22)". The association of homosexual sex with immorality or sinfulness is seen by many as a homophobic act.

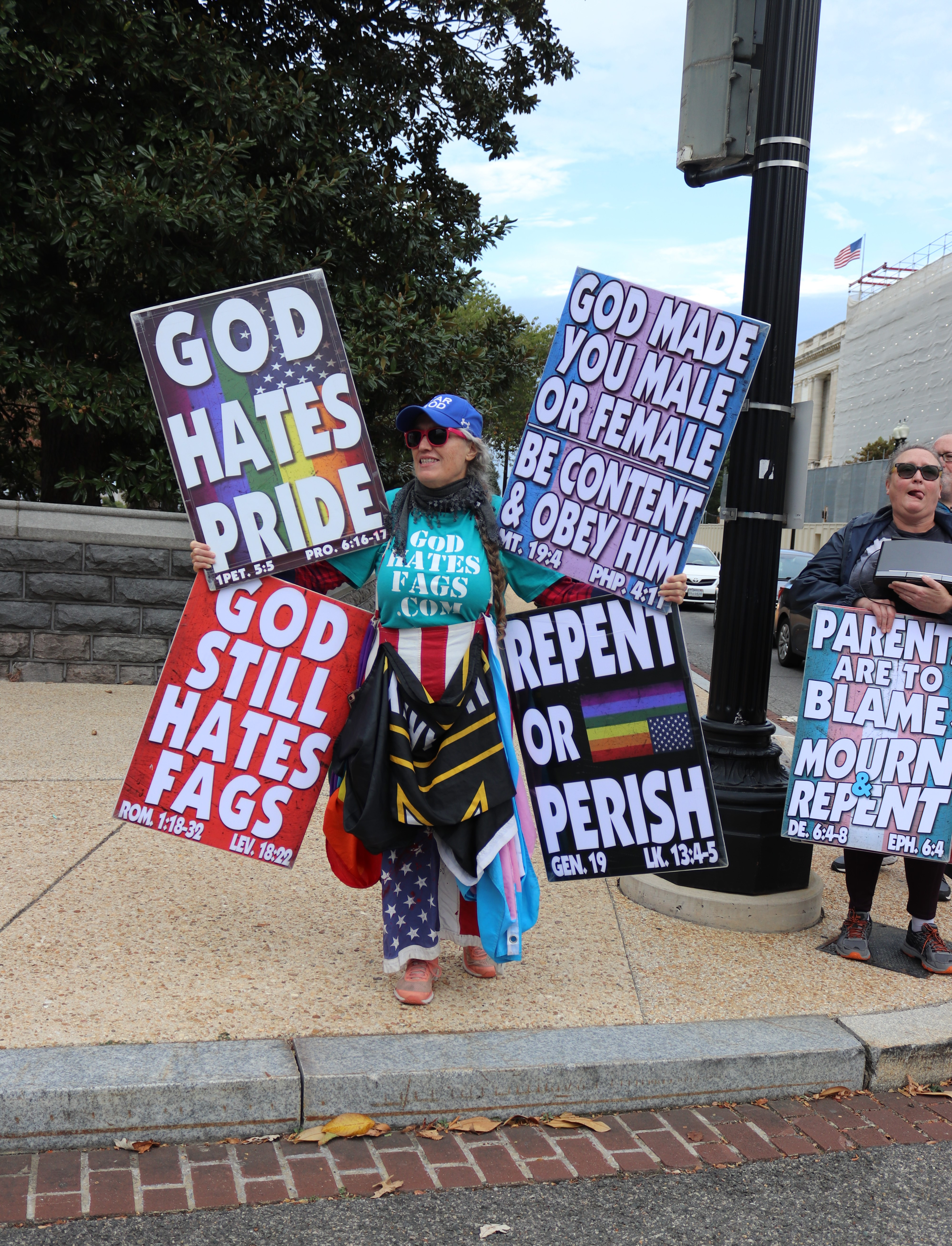
Homophobic Westboro Baptist Church protesters in Washington, D.C., 2019

Some world religions contain anti-homosexual teachings, while other religions have varying degrees of ambivalence, neutrality, or incorporate teachings that regard homosexuals as third gender. Even within some religions which generally discourage homosexuality, there may also be people who view homosexuality positively, and some religious denominations bless or conduct same-sex marriages. There also exist so-called Queer religions, dedicated to serving the spiritual needs of LGBTQ people. Queer theology seeks to provide a counterpoint to religious homophobia. In 2015, attorney and author Roberta Kaplan stated that Kim Davis "is the clearest example of someone who wants to use a religious liberty argument to discriminate [against same-sex couples]."

===== Christianity and the Bible =====
Passages commonly interpreted as condemning homosexuality or same-gender sexual relations are found in both Old and New Testaments of the Bible. Leviticus 18:22 says "Thou shalt not lie with mankind, as with womankind: it is abomination." A similar verse, Leviticus 20:13 says "If a man also lie with mankind, as he lieth with a woman, both of them have committed an abomination: they shall surely be put to death; their blood shall be upon them." The destruction of Sodom and Gomorrah is also commonly seen as a condemnation of homosexuality. Though lesbian sex is not specifically mentioned, Romans 1:26-27 could be interpreted as condemnation of it. Christians and Jews who oppose homosexuality may often cite such passages; the historical context and interpretation of which is more complicated. Scholarly debate over the interpretation of these passages has tended to focus on placing them in proper historical context, for instance pointing out that Sodom's sins are historically interpreted as being other than homosexuality, and on the translation of rare or unusual words in the passages in question. In Religion Dispatches magazine, Candace Chellew-Hodge argues that the six or so verses that are often cited to condemn LGBTQ people are referring instead to "abusive sex". She states that the Bible has no condemnation for "loving, committed, gay and lesbian relationships" and that Jesus was silent on the subject. This view is opposed by a number of conservative evangelicals, including Robert A. J. Gagnon.

The official teaching of the Catholic Church regarding homosexuality is that same-sex behavior should not be expressed. In the United States, a February 2025 Pew Research Center poll shows that 70% of American Catholics support gay marriage. That is a significant shift upwards from 2010, when 46% of Catholics favored gay marriage. The Catechism of the Catholic Church states that, "'homosexual acts are intrinsically disordered.'...They are contrary to the natural law.... Under no circumstances can they be approved."

===== Islam and Sharia =====
In some cases, the distinction between religious homophobia and state-sponsored homophobia is not clear, a key example being territories under Islamic authority. All major Islamic sects forbid homosexuality, which is a crime under Sharia Law and treated as such in most Muslim countries. In Afghanistan, for instance, homosexuality carries the death penalty under Taliban rule. During the Islamic Republic period, it was instead punishable by fine or prison sentence. After the revolution of 1979 in Iran and the establishment of a new government based on Islamic Sharia, the pressure and punishment against LGBTQ people has expanded in this country. The legal situation in the United Arab Emirates, however, is unclear.

In 2009, the International Lesbian and Gay Association (ILGA) published a report entitled State Sponsored Homophobia 2009, which is based on research carried out by Daniel Ottosson at Södertörn University College, Stockholm, Sweden. This research found that of the 80 countries around the world that continue to consider homosexuality illegal:

- Seven carry the death penalty for homosexual activity: Iran, Mauritania, Saudi Arabia, Sudan, Yemen, Afghanistan and Brunei. Since the 1979 Islamic revolution in Iran, the Iranian government has executed more than 4,000 people charged with homosexual acts. In Saudi Arabia, the maximum punishment for homosexuality is public execution, but the government will use other punishments – e.g., fines, jail time, whipping – as alternatives, unless it feels that people engaging in homosexual activity are challenging state authority by engaging in LGBTQ social movements. On the other hand, due to the traditional and religious structure of Islamic societies, people also refuse to accept the identity of homosexuals and have a conservative attitude towards them.
- Two carry the death penalty in certain regions: Nigeria and Somalia.

In some regions, gay people have been persecuted and murdered by Islamist militias, such as Al-Nusra Front and ISIL in parts of Iraq and Syria.

==== State-sponsored ====
Worldwide laws regarding same-sex intercourse, unions and expression. Same-sex intercourse legal. Recognition of unions: Marriage / Extraterritorial marriage^{2}; Civil unions / Limited domestic; Limited foreign / Optional certification; Same-sex intercourse illegal. Penalties: Death / Prison; death not enforced; Death under militias / Prison, with arrests or detention; Prison, not enforced^{1}; Ambiguous.: None / Restriction of expression, not enforced; Restriction of association with arrests or detention^{1}No imprisonment in the past three years or moratorium on law.^{2}Marriage not available locally. Some jurisdictions may perform other types of partnerships.

State-sponsored homophobia includes the criminalization and penalization of homosexuality, hate speech from government figures, and other forms of discrimination, violence, persecution of LGBTQ people.

===== Past governments =====
In medieval Europe, homosexuality was considered sodomy and was punishable by death. Persecutions reached their height during the Medieval Inquisitions, when the sects of Cathars and Waldensians were accused of fornication and sodomy, alongside accusations of Satanism. In 1307, accusations of sodomy and homosexuality were major charges leveled during the Trial of the Knights Templar. The theologian Thomas Aquinas was influential in linking condemnation of homosexuality with the idea of natural law, arguing that "special sins are against nature, as, for instance, those that run counter to the intercourse of male and female natural to animals, and so are peculiarly qualified as unnatural vices."

Although bisexuality was accepted as normal human behavior in Ancient China, homophobia became ingrained in the late Qing dynasty and the Republic of China due to interactions with the Christian West, and homosexual behavior was outlawed in 1740. During the Cultural Revolution, homosexuality was treated by the government as a "social disgrace or a form of mental illness", and individuals who were homosexual widely faced persecution. Although there were no laws specifically against homosexuality, other laws were used to prosecute homosexual people and they were "charged with hooliganism or disturbing public order."

The Soviet Union under Vladimir Lenin decriminalized homosexuality in 1922, long before many other European countries. The Soviet Communist Party effectively legalized no-fault divorce, abortion and homosexuality, when they abolished all the old Tsarist laws and the initial Soviet criminal code kept these liberal sexual policies in place. Lenin's emancipation was reversed a decade later by Joseph Stalin and homosexuality remained illegal under Article 121 until the Yeltsin era.

In Nazi Germany, gay men were persecuted and approximately five to fifteen thousand were imprisoned in Nazi concentration camps.

===== Current governments =====
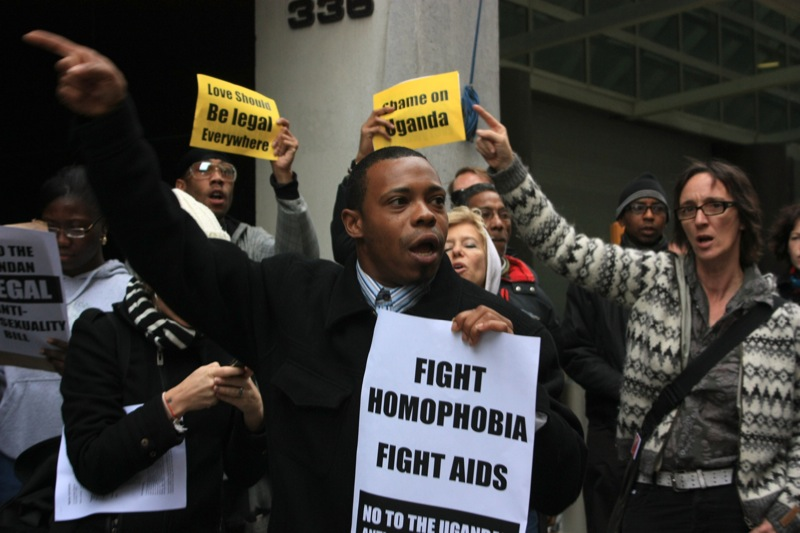
Protests in New York City against Uganda's Anti-Homosexuality Bill

As of May 2016, homosexuality is illegal in 74 countries. The North Korean government condemns Western gay culture as a vice caused by the decadence of a capitalist society, and it denounces it as promoting consumerism, classism, and promiscuity. In North Korea, "violating the rules of collective socialist life" can be punished with up to two years' imprisonment. Park Jeong-Won, a law professor at Kookmin University, said that, while he was not aware of any North Korean laws explicitly prohibiting homosexual relationships, laws against extramarital affairs and breaking moral customs would likely be used to prosecute homosexual acts.

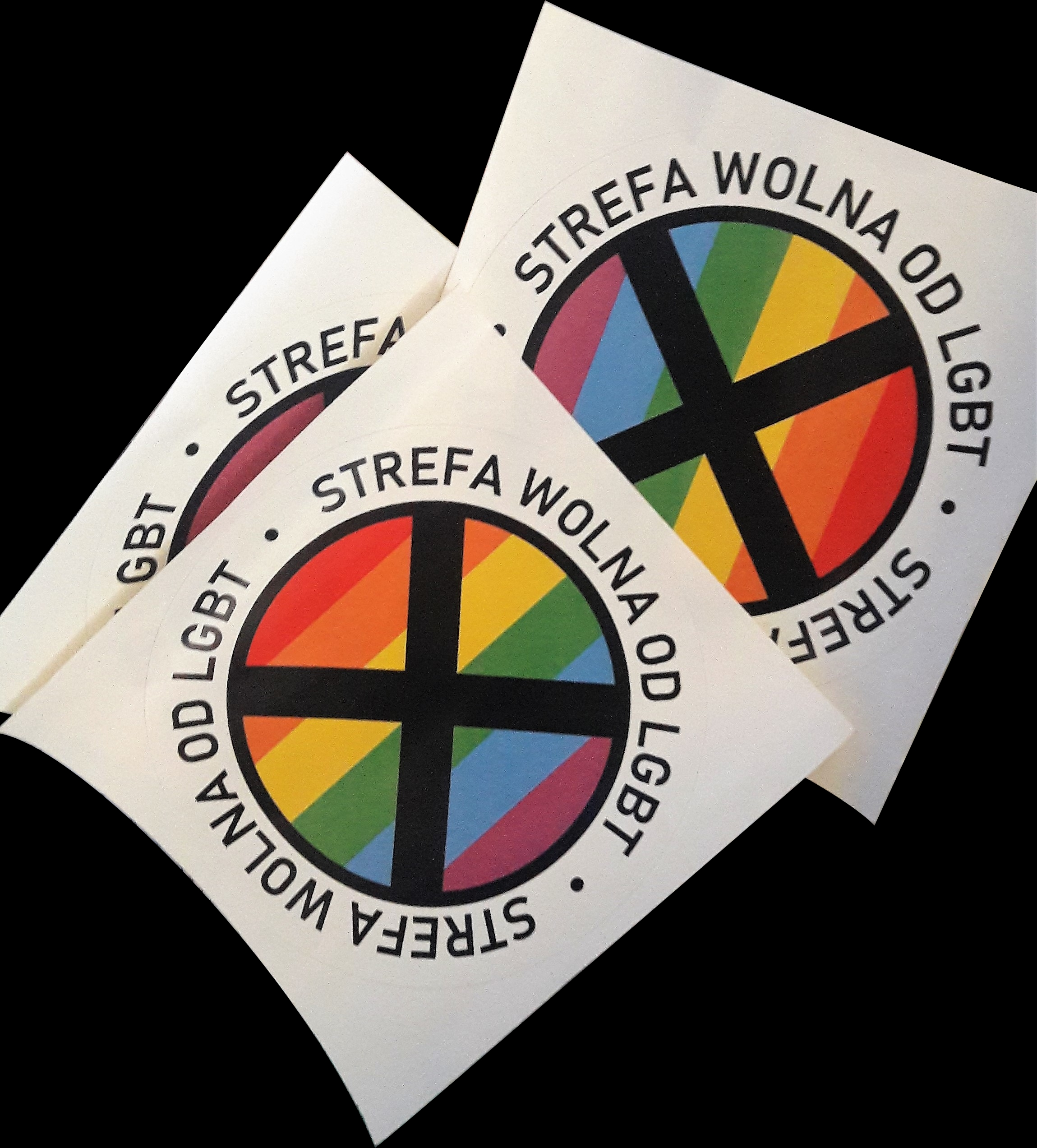
LGBT-free zone stickers distributed by the Gazeta Polska newspaper

Robert Mugabe, the former president of Zimbabwe, waged a violent campaign against LGBTQ people, arguing that before colonisation, Zimbabweans did not engage in homosexual acts. His first major public condemnation of homosexuality was in August 1995, during the Zimbabwe International Book Fair. He told an audience: "If you see people parading themselves as lesbians and gays, arrest them and hand them over to the police!" In September 1995, Zimbabwe's parliament introduced legislation banning homosexual acts. In 1997, a court found Canaan Banana, Mugabe's predecessor and the first President of Zimbabwe, guilty of 11 counts of sodomy and indecent assault.

In Poland, local towns, cities, and Voivodeship sejmiks have declared their respective regions as LGBTQ ideology free zone with the encouragement of the ruling Law and Justice party.

Since 2006, under Vladimir Putin, regions in Russia have enacted varying laws restricting the distribution of materials promoting LGBTQ relationships to minors. In June 2013, a federal law criminalizing the distribution of materials among minors in support of non-traditional sexual relationships was enacted as an amendment to an existing child protection law. The law resulted in the numerous arrests of Russian LGBTQ citizens. In 2023 the Supreme Court of Russia declared that the international LGBTQ rights movement is an extremist organization.

=== Internalized ===
Internalized homophobia encompasses negative stereotypes, beliefs, stigma, and prejudice about homosexuality and LGBTQ people that a person with same-sex attraction turns inward on themselves, whether or not they identify as LGBTQ.

Some studies have shown that people who are homophobic are more likely to have repressed homosexual desires. In 1996, a controlled study of 64 heterosexual men (half said they were homophobic by experience, with self-reported orientation) at the University of Georgia found that men who were found to be homophobic (as measured by the Index of Homophobia) were considerably more likely to experience more erectile responses when exposed to homoerotic images than non-homophobic men. Weinstein and colleagues arrived at similar results when researchers found that students who came from controlling and homophobic homes were most likely to reveal repressed homosexual attraction. The researchers said that this explained why some religious leaders who denounce homosexuality are later revealed to have secret homosexual relations. One co-author said, "In many cases these are people who are at war with themselves and they are turning this internal conflict outward." A 2016 eye-tracking study showed that heterosexual men with high negative impulse reactions toward homosexuals gazed for longer periods at homosexual imagery than other heterosexual men. According to Cheval et al. (2016), these findings reinforce the necessity to consider that homophobia might reflect concerns about sexuality in general and not homosexuality in particular. In contrast, Jesse Marczyk argued in Psychology Today that homophobia is not necessarily repressed homosexuality.

The effect of these ideas depends on how much and which they have consciously and subconsciously internalized. These negative beliefs can be mitigated with education, life experience, and therapy, especially with gay-friendly psychotherapy/analysis. Internalized homophobia also applies to conscious or unconscious behaviors which a person feels the need to promote or conform to cultural expectations of heteronormativity or heterosexism. This can include repression and denial coupled with forced outward displays of heteronormative behavior for the purpose of appearing or attempting to feel "normal" or "accepted". Other expressions of internalized homophobia can also be subtle. Some less overt behaviors may include making assumptions about the gender of a person's romantic partner, or about gender roles. Some researchers also apply this label to LGBTQ people who support "compromise" policies, such as those that find civil unions acceptable in place of same-sex marriage.

Researcher Iain R. Williamson finds the term homophobia to be "highly problematic", but for reasons of continuity and consistency with the majority of other publications on the issue retains its use rather than using more accurate but obscure terminology. The phrase internalized sexual stigma is sometimes used in place to represent internalized homophobia. An internalized stigma arises when a person believes negative stereotypes about themselves, regardless of where the stereotypes come from. It can also refer to many stereotypes beyond sexuality and gender roles. Internalized homophobia can cause discomfort with and disapproval of one's own sexual orientation. Ego-dystonic sexual orientation or egodystonic homophobia, for instance, is a condition characterized by having a sexual orientation or an attraction that is at odds with one's idealized self-image, causing anxiety and a desire to change one's orientation or become more comfortable with one's sexual orientation. Such a situation may cause extreme repression of homosexual desires. In other cases, a conscious internal struggle may occur for some time, often pitting deeply held religious or social beliefs against strong sexual and emotional desires. This discordance can cause clinical depression, and a higher rate of suicide among LGBTQ youth (up to 30 percent of non-heterosexual youth attempt suicide) has been attributed to this phenomenon. Psychotherapy, such as gay affirmative psychotherapy, and participation in a sexual-minority affirming group can help resolve the internal conflicts, such as between religious beliefs and sexual identity. Even informal therapies that address understanding and accepting of non-heterosexual orientations can prove effective. Many diagnostic "Internalized Homophobia Scales" can be used to measure a person's discomfort with their sexuality and some can be used by people regardless of gender or sexual orientation. Critics of the scales note that they presume a discomfort with non-heterosexuality which in itself enforces heteronormativity.

=== Social ===
The fear of being identified as gay can be considered as a form of social homophobia. Theorists including Calvin Thomas and Judith Butler have suggested that homophobia can be rooted in an individual's fear of being identified as gay. Homophobia in men is correlated with insecurity about masculinity. For this reason, homophobia is allegedly rampant in sports, and in the subculture of its supporters that is considered stereotypically male, such as association football and rugby.

Nancy J. Chodorow states that homophobia can be viewed as a method of protection of male masculinity. Various psychoanalytic theories explain homophobia as a threat to an individual's own same-sex impulses, whether those impulses are imminent or merely hypothetical. This threat causes repression, denial or reaction formation.

== Distribution of attitude ==
Boys Beware, a 1961 US social guidance film warning boys to beware the "predatory" dangers of homosexual men. The film pushes the common homophobic tropes that homosexuality is a mental illness, and that gay men are pedophiles.

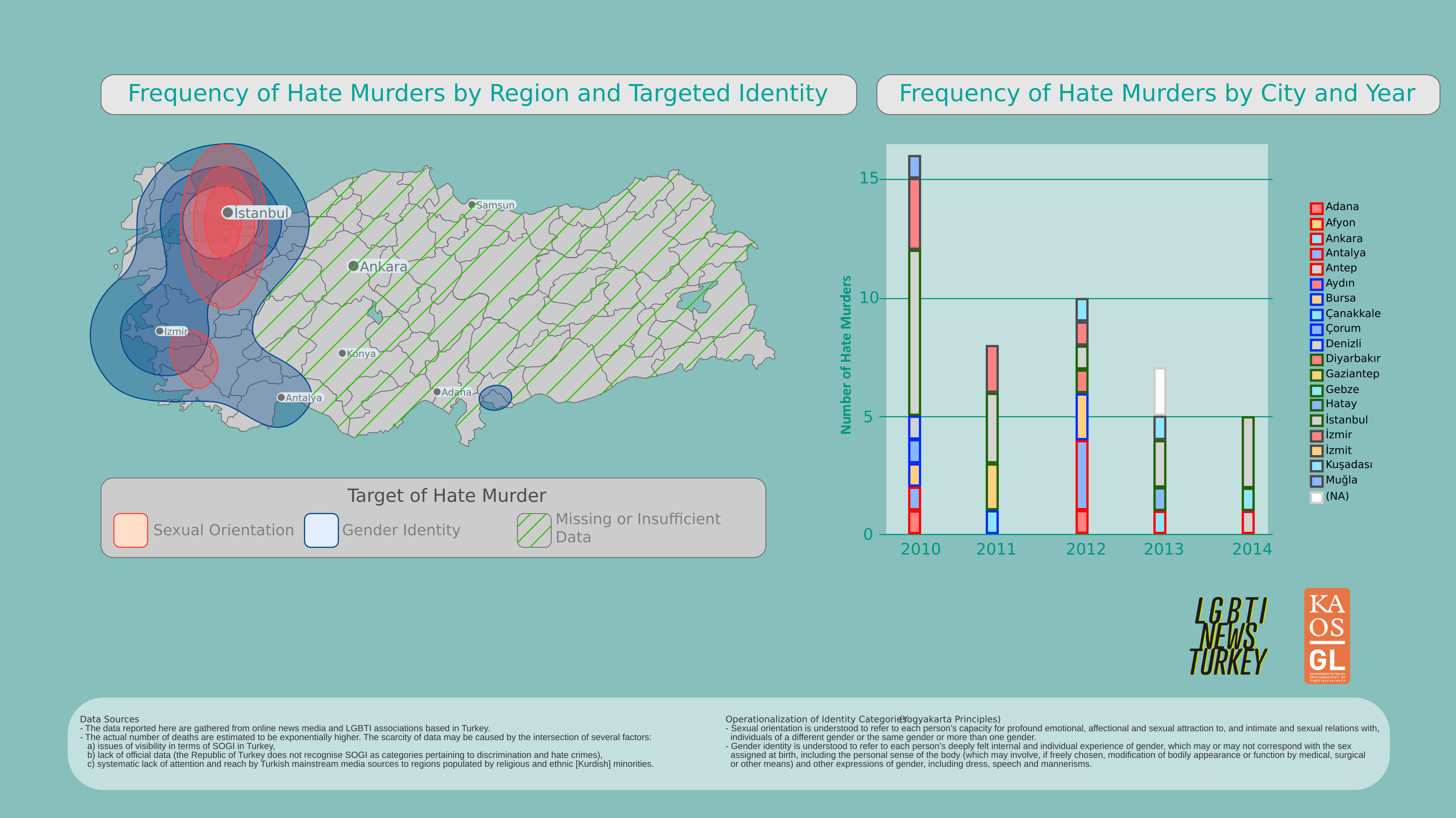
Between January 2010 and November 2014, 47 individuals have been killed due to their real or perceived sexual orientation or gender identity in Turkey according to online news sources.

Homophobia is not evenly distributed throughout society, but is more or less pronounced according to ethnicity, age, geographic location, race, sex, social class, education, partisan identification and religion. According to UK HIV/AIDS charity AVERT, religious views, lack of homosexual feelings or experiences, and lack of interaction with gay people are strongly associated with such views.

The anxiety of heterosexual individuals (particularly adolescents whose construction of heterosexual masculinity is based in part on not being seen as gay) that others may identify them as gay has also been identified by Michael Kimmel as an example of homophobia. The taunting of boys seen as eccentric (and who are not usually gay) is said to be endemic in rural and suburban American schools, and has been associated with risk-taking behavior and outbursts of violence (such as a spate of school shootings) by boys seeking revenge or trying to assert their masculinity. Homophobic bullying is also very common in schools in the United Kingdom. At least 445 LGBTQ Brazilians were either murdered or died of suicide in 2017.

In some cases, the works of authors who merely have the word "Gay" in their name (Gay Talese, Peter Gay) or works about things also contain the name (Enola Gay) have been destroyed because of a perceived pro-homosexual bias.

In the United States, attitudes vary on the basis of partisan identification. Republicans are far more likely than Democrats to have negative attitudes about gays and lesbians, according to surveys conducted by the National Election Studies from 2000 through 2004. Homophobia also varies by region; statistics show that the Southern United States has more reports of anti-gay prejudice than any other region in the US.

In a 1998 address, civil rights leader Coretta Scott King stated, "Homophobia is like racism and anti-Semitism and other forms of bigotry in that it seeks to dehumanize a large group of people, to deny their humanity, their dignity and personhood." One study of white adolescent males conducted at the University of Cincinnati by Janet Baker has been used to argue that negative feelings towards gay people are also associated with other discriminatory behaviors. According to the study, hatred of gay people, antisemitism, and racism are "likely companions". Baker hypothesized "maybe it's a matter of power and looking down on all you think are at the bottom." A study performed in 2007 in the UK for the charity Stonewall reports that up to 90 percent of the population support anti-discrimination laws protecting gay and lesbian people.

== Economic cost ==
There are at least two studies which indicate that homophobia may have a negative economic impact for the countries where it is widespread. In these countries there is a flight of their LGBTQ populations—with the consequent loss of talent—as well as an avoidance of LGBTQ tourism, that leaves the pink money in LGBTQ-friendlier countries. As an example, LGBTQ tourists contribute 6.8 billion dollars every year to the Spanish economy.

As soon as 2005, an editorial from the New York Times related the politics of don't ask, don't tell in the US Army with the lack of translators from Arabic, and with the delay in the translation of Arabic documents, calculated to be about 120,000 hours at the time. Since 1998, with the introduction of the new policy, about 20 Arabic translators had been expelled from the Army, specifically during the years the US was involved in wars in Iraq and Afghanistan.

M. V. Lee Badgett, an economist at the University of Massachusetts Amherst, presented in March 2014 in a meeting of the World Bank the results of a study about the economic impact of homophobia in India. Only in health expenses, caused by depression, suicide, and HIV treatment, India would have spent additional 23,100 million dollars due to homophobia. On top, there would be costs caused by violence, workplace loss, rejection of the family, and bullying at school, that would result in a lower education level, lower productivity, lower wages, worse health, and a lower life expectancy among the LGBTQ population. In total, she estimated for 2014 in India a loss of up to 30,800 million dollars, or 1.7% of the Indian GDP.

The LGBTQ activist Adebisi Alimi, in a preliminary estimation, has calculated that the economic loss due to homophobia in Nigeria is about 1% of its GDP. Taking into account that in 2015 homosexuality is still illegal in 36 of the 54 African countries, the money loss due to homophobia in the continent could amount to hundreds of millions of dollars every year.

Another study regarding socioecological measurement of homophobia and its public health impact for 158 countries was conducted in 2018. It found that the prejudice against gay people has a worldwide economic cost of $119.1 billion. Economical loss in Asia was 88.29 billion dollars due to homophobia, and in Latin America & the Caribbean it was 8.04 billion dollars. Economical cost in East Asia and Middle Asia was 10.85 billion dollars. Economical cost in Middle East and North Africa was 16.92 billion dollars. The researcher suggested that a 1% decrease in the level of homophobia is correlated with a 10% increase in the gross domestic product per capita – though this does not imply causation.

A 2018 study by The Williams Institute (UCLA School of Law) concludes that there is a positive correlation between LGBTQ inclusion and GDP per capita. According to this study, the legal rights of LGBTQ people have a bigger influence than the degree of acceptance in the society, but both effects reinforce each other. A one-point increase in their LGBT Global Acceptance Index (GAI) showed an increase of $1,506 in GDP per capita, and one additional legal right was correlated with an increase of $1,694 in GDP per capita.

== Countermeasures ==
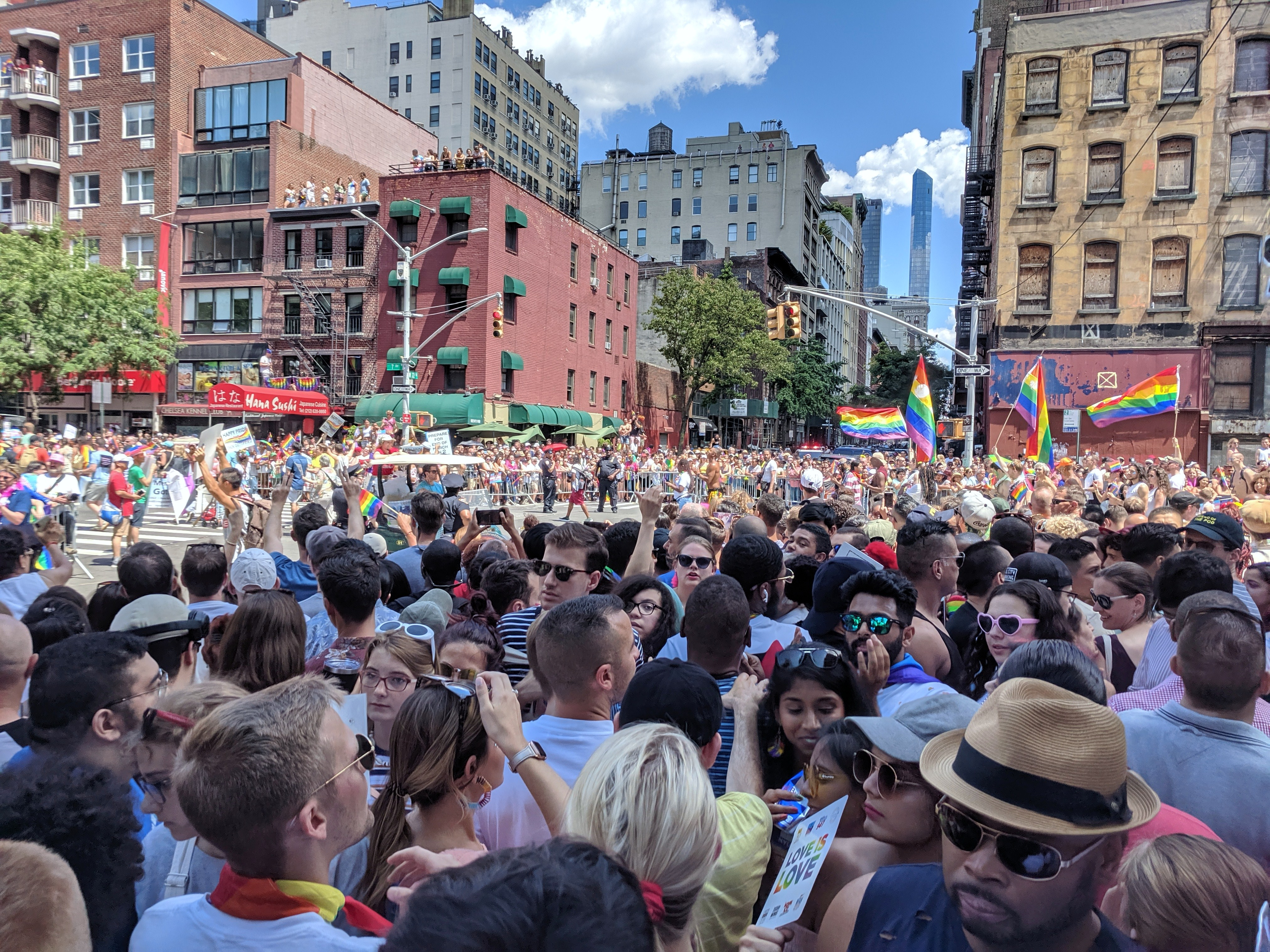
The NYC Pride March is the world's largest LGBTQ event. Regional variation exists with respect to tolerance, the antithesis of homophobic discrimination, in different parts of the world.

Most international human rights organizations, such as Human Rights Watch and Amnesty International, condemn laws that make homosexual relations between consenting adults a crime. Since 1994, the United Nations Human Rights Committee has also ruled that such laws violated the right to privacy guaranteed in the Universal Declaration of Human Rights and the International Covenant on Civil and Political Rights. In 2008, the Roman Catholic Church issued a statement which "urges States to do away with criminal penalties against [homosexual persons]." The statement, however, was addressed to reject a resolution by the UN Assembly that would have precisely called for an end of penalties against homosexuals in the world. In March 2010, the Committee of Ministers of the Council of Europe adopted a recommendation on measures to combat discrimination on grounds of sexual orientation or gender identity, described by CoE Secretary General as the first legal instrument in the world dealing specifically with one of the most long-lasting and difficult forms of discrimination to combat.

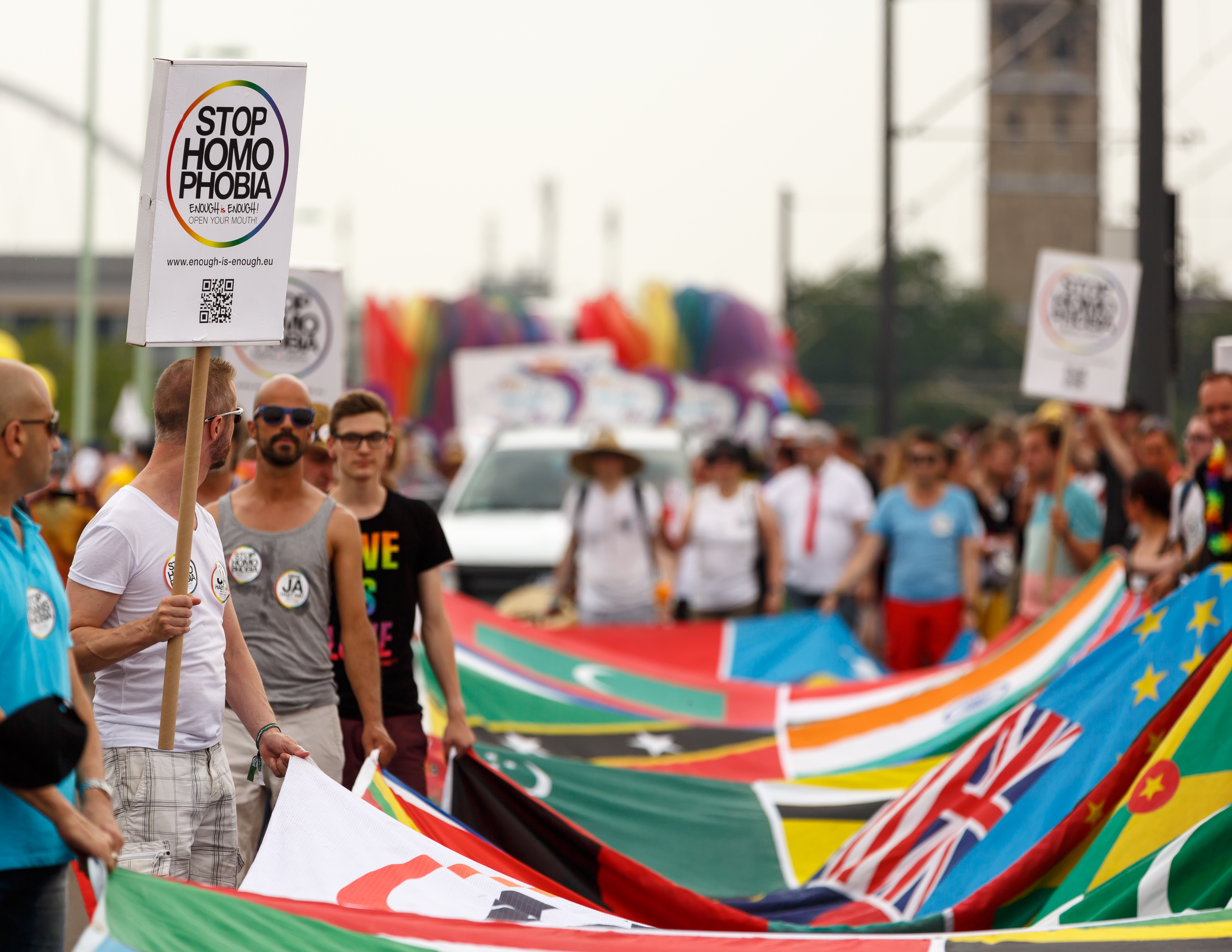
LGBTQ activists at Cologne Pride carrying a banner with the flags of over 70 countries where homosexuality is illegal

To combat homophobia, the LGBTQ community uses events such as gay pride parades and political activism (See gay pride). Cities across the word use crossings repainted in rainbow colors for their annual pride parades. The first permanent crossings have been put on roads in Lambeth, England.

One form of organized resistance to homophobia is the International Day Against Homophobia (or IDAHO), first celebrated 17 May 2005, in related activities in more than 40 countries. The four largest countries of Latin America (Argentina, Brazil, Mexico, and Colombia) developed mass media campaigns against homophobia since 2002.

In addition to public expression, legislation has been designed, controversially, to oppose homophobia, as in hate speech, hate crime, and laws against discrimination on the basis of sexual orientation. Successful preventative strategies against homophobic prejudice and bullying in schools have included teaching pupils about historical figures who were gay, or who suffered discrimination because of their sexuality.

Some argue that anti-LGBTQ prejudice is immoral and goes above and beyond the effects on that class of people. Warren J. Blumenfeld argues that this emotion gains a dimension beyond itself, as a tool for extreme right-wing conservatives and fundamentalist religious groups and as a restricting factor on gender-relations as to the weight associated with performing each role accordingly. Furthermore, Blumenfeld in particular stated:

"Anti-gay bias causes young people to engage in sexual behavior earlier in order to prove that they are straight. Anti-gay bias contributed significantly to the spread of the AIDS epidemic. Anti-gay bias prevents the ability of schools to create effective honest sexual education programs that would save children's lives and prevent STDs (sexually transmitted diseases)."

Drawing upon research by Arizona State University Professor Elizabeth Segal, University of Memphis professors Robin Lennon-Dearing and Elena Delavega argued in a 2016 article published in the Journal of Homosexuality that homophobia could be reduced through exposure (learning about LGBTQ experiences), explanation (understanding the different challenges faced by LGBTQ people), and experience (putting themselves in situations experienced by LGBTQ people by working alongside LGBTQ co-workers or volunteering at an LGBTQ community center).

== Criticism of meaning and purpose ==
=== Distinctions and proposed alternatives ===
Researchers have proposed alternative terms to describe prejudice and discrimination against LGBTQ people. Some of these alternatives show more semantic transparency while others do not include -phobia:

- Homoerotophobia, being a possible precursor term to homophobia, was coined by Wainwright Churchill and documented in Homosexual Behavior Among Males in 1967.
- The etymology of homophobia citing the union of homos and phobos is the basis for LGBTQ historian John Boswell's criticism of the term and for his suggestion in 1980 of the alternative homosexophobia.
- Homonegativity is based on the term homonegativism used by Hudson and Ricketts in a 1980 paper; they coined the term for their research to avoid homophobia, which they regarded as being unscientific in its presumption of motivation.
- Heterosexism refers to a system of negative attitudes, bias, and discrimination in favour of opposite-sex sexual orientation and relationships. It can include the presumption that everyone is heterosexual or that opposite-sex attractions and relationships are the only norm and therefore superior.
- Sexual prejudice – Researcher at the University of California, Davis, Gregory M. Herek preferred sexual prejudice as being descriptive, free of presumptions about motivations, and lacking value judgments as to the irrationality or immorality of those so labeled. He compared homophobia, heterosexism, and sexual prejudice, and, in preferring the third term, noted that homophobia was "probably more widely used and more often criticized." He also observed that "Its critics note that homophobia implicitly suggests that antigay attitudes are best understood as an irrational fear and that they represent a form of individual psychopathology rather than a socially reinforced prejudice."

=== Other names ===
Negative attitudes toward identifiable LGBTQ groups have similar yet specific names: lesbophobia is the intersection of homophobia and sexism directed against lesbians, gayphobia is the dislike or hatred of gay men, biphobia targets bisexuality and bisexual people, and transphobia targets transgender and transsexual people and gender variance or gender role nonconformity.

==== Non-neutral phrasing ====
Use of homophobia, homophobic, and homophobe has been criticized as pejorative against LGBTQ rights opponents. Behavioral scientists William O'Donohue and Christine Caselles stated in 1993 that "as [homophobia] is usually used, [it] makes an illegitimately pejorative evaluation of certain open and debatable value positions, much like the former disease construct of homosexuality" itself, arguing that the term may be used as an ad hominem argument against those who advocate values or positions of which the user does not approve.

Psychologists Gregory M. Herek and Beverly A. Greene also find fault with the term "homophobia:" "Technically, homophobia means fear of sameness, yet its usage implies a fear of homosexuals....the –phobia suffix implies a specific kind of fear... Fear or aversion may comprise one component of beliefs about homosexuality, but other factors are unquestionably important. Several alternative terms have been offered ...These include homonegativism (Hudson & Ricketts, 1980), homosexism (Hansen, 1982), and heterosexism (Herek, 1986a). Unfortunately, none has gained widespread acceptance."

However, neutral use of the term has gained acceptance and usage over time since the 1990s. In 2017, the Associated Press Stylebook added an entry for "homophobia" and "homophobic" for the first time, after having excluded it in 2012. The entry says the terms are "acceptable in broad references or in quotations to the concept of fear or hatred of gays, lesbians and bisexuals."

==== Heterophobia ====
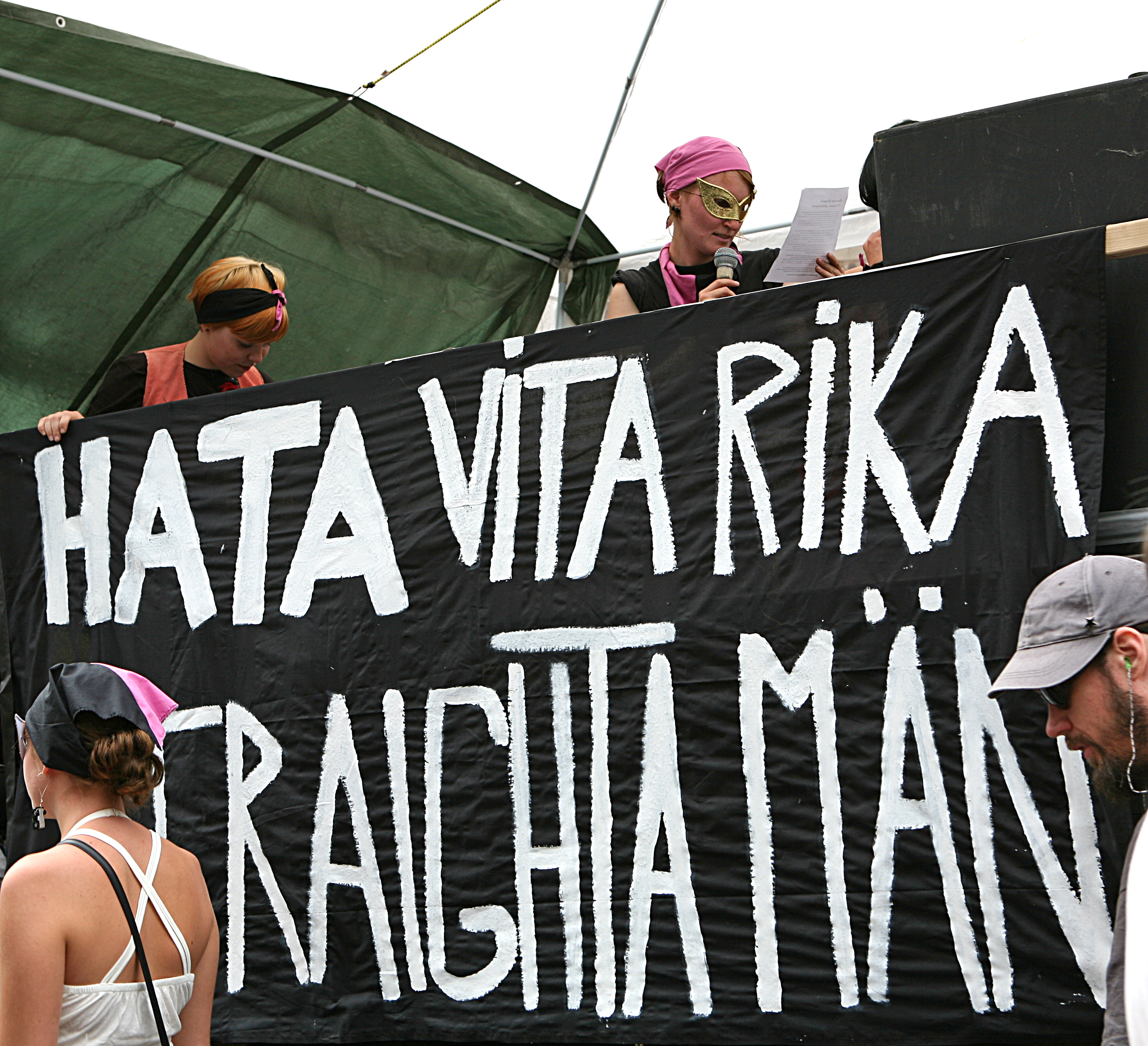
We hate white, rich, heterosexual men – protest slogan of radical feminists at the Stockholm Pride parade (2009)

Heterophobia is defined as the fear, aversion, avoidance, or discrimination against heterosexual individuals. In psychological research, particularly among gay men, heterophobia has been operationalized to include social disconnectedness, expectations of rejection, and unease or avoidance of heterosexual individuals. It has been linked to behavioral health outcomes and may contribute to social isolation, intergroup conflict, and difficulties in forming social or romantic relationships.

The scientific use of heterophobia in sexology remains limited and contested, being restricted to researchers who question Alfred Kinsey's sex research. To date, the existence or extent of heterophobia is mostly unrecognized by sexologists. Beyond sexology, there is no consensus as to the meaning of the term because it is also used to mean "fear of the opposite", such as in Pierre-André Taguieff's The Force of Prejudice: On Racism and Its Doubles (2001).

Stephen M. White and Louis R. Franzini introduced the related term heteronegativism to refer to the range of negative feelings that some gay individuals may hold toward heterosexuals. This term is preferred to heterophobia because it does not imply extreme or irrational fear.

== See also ==
- Anti-LGBTQ rhetoric
- Corrective rape
- Discrimination against non-binary people
- Faggot (slang)
- Gay panic defense
- Homosexual agenda
- Heteropatriarchy
- Homophobia in ethnic minority communities
- Homosexuality and Citizenship in Florida (pamphlet)
- Lavender scare
- Liberal homophobia
- Minority stress
- Riddle scale
- Sexual repression
- Stop Murder Music
- Yogyakarta Principles
