= Homosexuality in the DSM =

History of homosexuality as a diagnosed psychopathology

Homosexuality is not classified as a mental disorder in the current Diagnostic and Statistical Manual of Mental Disorders (DSM); it was removed in the 1970s after activism and research demonstrated it to be a normal variation of human sexuality rather than a pathology. The current DSM does not include any category diagnosing homosexuality, reflecting a broad scientific consensus that non-heterosexuality is not a disorder.

Homosexuality was classified as a mental disorder in the first edition of the DSM, published in 1952 by the American Psychiatric Association (APA). This classification was challenged by gay rights activists during the gay liberation movement especially following the 1969 Stonewall riots, and rendered problematic by research especially by Alfred Kinsey and Evelyn Hooker suggesting homosexuality is normal and non-pathological. In December 1973, the APA board of trustees voted to declassify homosexuality as a mental disorder, and in 1974, the full APA membership voted to confirm this. The DSM was thus updated: in the 1974 seventh printing of the second edition (DSM-II), homosexuality was replaced with a new diagnostic code for individuals distressed by their homosexuality, termed ego-dystonic sexual orientation. Distress over one's sexual orientation remained in the manual, under different names, until the DSM-5 in 2013.

== Before the DSM ==
The DSM's direct predecessor was the Statistical Manual for the Use of Institutions of the Insane, first published in 1918 (by its 10th edition in 1942 it had become called the Statistical Manual for the Use of Hospitals of Mental Diseases). The Statistical Manual was ambiguous on the topic of homosexuality; it included a condition called "constitutional psychopathic inferiority (without psychosis)" that was described as "a large group of pathological personalities" including "sexual perversions". Meanwhile, in the 1935 Standard Classified Nomenclature of Disease, homosexuality was classified as a "pathological sexuality" under the category of "psychopathic personality".

== DSM-I ==
When the APA published the DSM-I in 1952, homosexuality was classified as a "sexual deviation" within the larger "sociopathic personality disturbance" category of personality disorders. The sexual deviation diagnosis included "homosexuality, transvestism, pedophilia, fetishism and sexual sadism" as examples.

Four years prior to the publication of the DSM-I, the first Kinsey Report was published by Alfred Kinsey and his fellow researchers, which found that "only 50 percent of the adult population is exclusively heterosexual throughout its adult life," based on a study of 5,300 men, but the psychiatry field was hostile to the Kinsey Report and the implications that same-sex sexual behavior was far more common than mainstream society had previously believed. In 1957, psychologist Evelyn Hooker published the results of a study that compared the happiness and well-adjusted nature of 30 self-identified homosexual men with 30 heterosexual men and found no difference, which similarly stunned the medical community. Hooker argued that researchers who claimed homosexuality was a mental disorder were drawing a false correlation by only studying homosexuals who had a history of treatment for mental illness. Meanwhile, a study of 106 homosexual men by Irving Bieber and other researchers, published in 1962, was used to justify the inclusion of homosexuality as a pathological hidden fear of the opposite sex caused by traumatic parent–child relationships, a view that was influential in the medical profession.

== DSM-II ==
=== Initial classification ===
The DSM-II, published in 1968, expanded the "sexual deviation" diagnostic category (now located within the larger category of "personality disorders and certain other nonpsychotic mental disorders") so that different "sexual deviations" were listed under ten individual diagnostic codes: homosexuality, fetishism, pedophilia, transvestitism, exhibitionism, voyeurism, sadism, masochism, other sexual deviation, and unspecified sexual deviation. While the DSM-I and its precursor the Statistical Manual included ambiguity in terms of whether homosexuality was a mental disorder, the DSM-II removed that ambiguity and clearly presented homosexuality and the other "sexual deviations" as mental disorders.

=== Sexual orientation disturbance ===
After extensive organizing by gay rights activists during the gay liberation of the 1960s and 1970s, the seventh printing of the DSM-II in 1974 renamed the code "homosexuality" as sexual orientation disturbance, and added descriptive text that noted that homosexuality "by itself does not constitute a psychiatric disorder" and that the renamed code should be used for "individuals whose sexual interests are directed primarily toward people of the same sex and who are either disturbed by, in conflict with, or wish to change their sexual orientation." (Note: Determining the correct DSM-II printing where the change occurred can be confusing because the American Psychiatric Association publication that announced the change is titled, in part, "Proposed change in DSM-II, 6th printing, page 44". However, a notice in that publication indicates that "the change appears on page 44 of this, the seventh printing.") This was considered a major victory by gay activists, because it clearly articulated a shift from considering homosexuality a mental disorder to only characterizing people as unwell if their sexual orientation caused them distress. The change was a compromise between competing schools of thought within the psychiatry field: the view that homosexuality was a pathological condition and the view that homosexuality is a normal variation of sexuality.

=== Background ===
The activism that resulted in changing the seventh printing of the DSM-II began in earnest in the wake of the Stonewall riots in 1969. Specific protests by gay rights activists against the APA began in 1970, when the organization held its convention in San Francisco. The activists disrupted the conference by interrupting speakers and shouting down and ridiculing psychiatrists who viewed homosexuality as a mental disorder. At the 1971 conference, gay rights activist Frank Kameny, working with the Gay Liberation Front to demonstrate against the convention, grabbed the microphone and yelled: "Psychiatry is the enemy incarnate. Psychiatry has waged a relentless war of extermination against us. You may take this as a declaration of war against you." At the 1972 conference, gay psychiatrist John E. Fryer spoke to the audience about what it was like for the many gay psychiatrists in the APA who had to hide their sexuality due to anti-gay prejudice within the field; he wore a mask and a wig and used a voice distorter to conceal his identity. This activism occurred in the context of a broader anti-psychiatry movement that had come to the fore in the 1960s and was challenging the legitimacy of psychiatric diagnosis. Anti-psychiatry activists protested at the same APA conventions, with some shared slogans and intellectual foundations.

Psychiatrist Robert Spitzer, who served as technical consultant to the DSM-II Committee on Nomenclature and Statistics, became a go-between in the dispute. Spitzer originally believed that homosexuality belonged in the DSM, but after meeting with gay activists, including a secret group of gay APA members later known as the Association of Gay and Lesbian Psychiatrists, and faced with data from researchers such as Kinsey and Hooker, he drafted the compromise of removing homosexuality itself from the DSM and replacing it with "sexual orientation disturbance". After a vote by the APA board of trustees in December 1973, and confirmed by the wider APA membership in 1974, this change was made. Psychiatrist Richard Green, who had argued forcefully in favor of declassifying homosexuality as a mental disorder, viewed Spitzer's insistence on including a diagnosis for homosexuals who were distressed by their sexuality as a poorly disguised attempt to maintain homophobic bias in the DSM, and publicly resigned from the APA nomenclature committee over it. Meanwhile, critics argued that declassifying homosexuality was a result of pressure from gay activists and demanded a referendum among voting members of the APA. The referendum was held in 1974 and the APA's decision was upheld by a 58% majority.

Despite the retention of "sexual orientation disturbance", gay activists celebrated the removal of homosexuality from the APA's list of mental disorders and declared victory. Kameny, now the head of the Mattachine Society of Washington, said, "This represents the culmination of a decade-long battle," and Ronald Gold of the National Gay Task Force declared, "We've won."

The APA published a position statement that urged an end to anti-homosexual discrimination and called for decriminalizing private sexual acts between consenting adults. However, the APA also made it clear that it did not endorse the view that homosexuality was a normal variant of sexuality.

== DSM-III ==
=== Classification ===
In the DSM-III, published in 1980, "sexual orientation disorder" was reworked as "ego-dystonic homosexuality" and the overarching categories were reorganized. While homosexuality was reintroduced into the name of the diagnosis, its criteria were stricter, in that it required that the subject must strongly want to change their orientation. The DSM-III included the completely new overarching diagnostic category "psychosexual disorders", which was divided into four subcategories:

- "gender identity disorders" (e.g., "transsexualism")
- "paraphilias" (which included everything previously called "sexual deviations" except for sexual orientation disturbance, with the addition of "zoophilia")
- "psychosexual dysfunctions" (e.g., "inhibited sexual desire" and "premature ejaculation")
- "other psychosexual disorders" (which consisted of two diagnoses: "ego-dystonic homosexuality" and "psychosexual disorder not elsewhere classified")

Ego-dystonic homosexuality was defined as having a desire to be heterosexual but not experiencing heterosexual arousal, or experiencing unwanted or distressing homosexual arousal that gets in the way of being heterosexual.

=== Background ===
The decision to include this reworked diagnosis in the DSM-III came after years of continued debate and controversy, both public and private. More and more scientific evidence challenged the assumption that homosexuality was a pathological condition, yet many within the psychiatric field adamantly believed it was. Robert Spitzer was chosen to lead the DSM-III's Task Force on Nomenclature, and he continued to feel that it was important to take "a middle position regarding the pathological status of homosexuality"; nine members of the task force agreed with him and five disagreed, leading to a deadlock. Classifications of "homodysphilia", "dyshomophilia", and "homosexual conflict disorder" were discussed, until finally, "ego-dystonic homosexuality" was proposed, along with a conceptual shift: instead of focusing on distress about being homosexual, the new classification was about a desire to be heterosexual and distress at one's inability to achieve that desire. A proposal to include additional information such as a note about how internalized homophobia can be a contributing factor eventually swayed enough critics; others, including Richard Green and Richard Pillard, remained adamantly opposed to including homosexuality in the DSM in any form, but they were eventually overruled.

Ego-dystonic homosexuality and its predecessor, sexual orientation disturbance, both legitimized sexual conversion therapies.

== DSM-III-R ==
=== Classification ===
In 1987, the APA published a major revision of the DSM-III (the DSM-III-R), again under the leadership of Robert Spitzer. In this edition, the "ego-dystonic homosexuality" classification was removed. In its place, "persistent and marked distress about one's sexual orientation" was added as one of three examples of the classification "sexual disorder not otherwise specified". The overarching section was renamed "sexual disorders" and the subsection "gender identity disorders" was moved to a different category—"disorders usually first evident in infancy, childhood, or adolescence"—and the "paraphilias" subsection was slightly reorganized.

=== Background ===
Leading up to the publication of the DSM-III-R, it had become clear to more and more people that the inclusion of "sexual orientation disturbance" and later "ego-dystonic homosexuality" in the DSM was the result of political compromises rather than scientific evidence, and that neither diagnosis actually met the definition of a disorder; critics pointed out that by the same logic, short people unhappy with their height could be considered mentally ill. Also influential was that it had been proven that psychological therapies could not "cure" homosexuality.

Just like in 1974 with the substitution of "sexual orientation disturbance" for homosexuality, in 1987 many people saw the removal of "ego-dystonic homosexuality" as the APA removing homosexuality from the DSM, but although the word "homosexuality" was removed, treatment was still provided. Mental health professionals could—and did—still diagnose LGB people with "sexual disorder not otherwise specified", thanks to the retention of "distress about one's sexual orientation" as part of that diagnostic category.

== DSM-IV and DSM-IV-TR ==
No change was made to the "sexual disorder not otherwise specified" category in either the DSM-IV, published in 1994, or the text revision of the manual in 2000 (the DSM-IV-TR). "Persistent and marked distress about sexual orientation" was still included as one of that category's examples. The overarching section of the manual was renamed "sexual and gender identity disorders" and the "gender identity disorders" subsection was moved back into this section.

== DSM-5 and DSM-5-TR ==
The DSM-5, published in 2013, and its 2022 revision (DSM-5-TR), does not include any diagnostic category that can be applied to people based on their sexual orientation. Some scholars have argued that only this can be considered "complete declassification" of non-heterosexual sexual orientations as mental disorders.

== See also ==
- Homosexuality and psychology
- Heteronormativity
- Timeline of sexual orientation and medicine
- Association of LGBTQ Psychiatrists
- Conversion therapy
- Gender dysphoria
