= GMA =

GMA or gma may refer to:

== Broadcasting ==
- GMA Network (company), a Philippine media company
  - GMA Network
- Good Morning America, a morning show on ABC
- Good Morning Australia (1981 TV program)
- Good Morning Australia (1992 TV program)

== Music ==
- GMA Music, a Philippine record label
- Genie Music Awards, in South Korea
- Golden Melody Awards, in Taiwan
- Gospel Music Association

== Places ==
- Greater Manila Area, Philippines
- General Mariano Alvarez, Cavite, Philippines
- Greater Moncton Area, New-Brunswick, Canada

== Other uses ==
- The Gautrain Management Agency in South Africa
- Gloria Macapagal Arroyo (born 1947), a Filipina politician and former President of the Philippines
- German Association for Medical Education (Gesellschaft für Medizinische Ausbildung, GMA)
- Glasgow Mid Argyll, a shinty club in Scotland
- Glycidyl methacrylate, an ester
- Grocery Manufacturers Association
- Gordon Murray Automotive, a British car manufacturer
- Intel GMA, a series of integrated graphics processors
- GEMS Modern Academy, a private school in the United Arab Emirates
- Gambera language, an ISO 639-3 code
- GLADD, previously known as the Gay Medical Association
- GMA TV, a fake news website in the Philippines that mimics GMA Network

== See also ==
- Sparkle GMA Artist Center, a talent agency in the Philippines
