= Timeline of sexual orientation and medicine =

Timeline of events related to sexual orientation and medicine

== 19th century ==
1886

- Richard Freiherr von Krafft-Ebing, a German psychiatrist, published a study of sexual perversity: Psychopathia Sexualis.

== 20th century ==
1948

- Sexual Behavior in the Human Male, the first "Kinsey Report", was published by Alfred Kinsey.

1953

- Sexual Behavior in the Human Female, the second "Kinsey Report", was published by Alfred Kinsey.

1957

- The Society for the Scientific Study of Sexuality was founded to encourage the rigorous systematic study of sexuality.

1973

- The American Psychiatric Association voted to remove homosexuality from the Diagnostic and Statistical Manual of Mental Disorders (DSM).

1975

- The Gay and Lesbian Health Caucus of the American Public Health Association is founded.

1977

- The Bay Area Physicians for Human Rights was founded in San Francisco as a support group for gay and lesbian medical students, residents, and other health care providers. The group claims to be the first LGBT medical society in the US.

1981

- The Gay and Lesbian Medical Association was founded in 1981 as the American Association of Physicians for Human Rights.
- The first cases of gay related immunodeficiency, now known as AIDS, were first reported 5 June 1981, when the US Centers for Disease Control and Prevention recorded a cluster of Pneumocystis carinii pneumonia in five homosexual men in Los Angeles.

1987

- The diagnosis of ego-dystonic homosexuality was dropped from the DSM.

1990

- The World Health Organization replaced its categorization of homosexuality as a mental illness with the diagnosis of ego-dystonic sexual orientation.

1991

- The American Psychoanalytic Association issued a statement allowing training of gay psychoanalysts.

1992

- The American Psychoanalytic Association prohibited discrimination against gay people when selecting teaching faculty.

1993

- Dean Hamer published a paper suggesting a genetic component to sexual orientation.

1995

- Saquinavir, the first protease inhibitor, was approved for public use by the FDA. HAART radically changes the prognosis of HIV/AIDS.

1996

- The US Department of Defense included homosexuality in a list of "mental disorders", in a document known as "directive 1332.38: physical disability evaluation".

== 21st century ==
2002

- The United States Department of Health and Human Services published Healthy People 2010, with the goals of increasing the quality and years of healthy life and eliminating health disparities in America. It identified sexual orientation as one of 6 demographic factors contributing to health disparities.

America's gay and lesbian population comprises a diverse community with disparate health concerns. Major health issues for gay men are HIV/AIDS and other sexually transmitted diseases, substance use, depression, and suicide. Gay male adolescents are two to three times more likely than their peers to attempt suicide. Some evidence suggests lesbians have higher rates of smoking, overweight, alcohol use disorder, and stress than heterosexual women. The issues surrounding personal, family, and social acceptance of sexual orientation can place a significant burden on mental health and personal safety.

— Healthy People 2010

2004

- New York Medical College revoked the charter of its LGBT medical student group after the group applies to change its name from Student Help Organization to Lesbian, Gay, Bisexual & Transgender People in Medicine. School officials claimed "the organization and its leader would advocate and promote activities inconsistent with the values of NYMC." In an interview with the Westchester Journal News, then AMA president John Nelson said that as a private institution the college has the right to set and enforce its own policies. The AMA organization did not support the ban, and the organization released a statement claiming the president's views were not representative of AMA policy.

If you own a business or if you have a private entity, and there are rules for membership there, you have to follow the rules or you can't be a member. For example, if you come to Brigham Young University, where my children happen to go to school, there are certain things you do not do, among which is, you do not drink Coca-Cola on campus because that's against the rules. ...

— John Nelson, president AMA

- The American Academy of Pediatrics published "Sexual orientation and adolescents", a report on the state of health of LGBT youth in the United States.

These [LGBT] adolescents may experience profound isolation and fear of discovery, which interferes with achieving developmental tasks of adolescence related to self-esteem, identity, and intimacy. Nonheterosexual youth often are subjected to harassment and violence; 45% of gay men and 20% of lesbians surveyed were victims of verbal and physical assaults in secondary school specifically because of their sexual orientation. Nonheterosexual youth are at higher risk of dropping out of school, being kicked out of their homes, and turning to life on the streets for survival. Some of these youth engage in substance use, and they are more likely than heterosexual peers to start using tobacco, alcohol, and illegal drugs at an earlier age. Youth in high school who identify themselves as gay, lesbian, or bisexual; engage in sexual activity with persons of the same sex; or report same-sex romantic attractions or relationships are more likely to attempt suicide, be victimized, and abuse substances. . . . School-based studies have found that these adolescents, compared with heterosexual peers, are 2 to 7 times more likely to attempt suicide [and] are 2 to 4 times more likely to be threatened with a weapon at school.

— American Academy of Pediatrics

2005

- American Medical Association president Edward Hill became the first AMA president to address the Gay and Lesbian Medical Association in a speech entitled "Understanding, Advocacy, Leadership: The AMA Perspective on LGBT Health."

I know that GLMA members and LGBT physicians have been treated unfairly by the AMA in the past. There is simply no excuse for discriminatory actions or exclusions based on sexual orientation or gender identity -- none. First, GLMA has opened [the AMA's] eyes to the diverse needs of LGBT patients, and second -- and just as important -- GLMA has told patients that they have the right to expect a health care system filled with openness, fairness and equality."

— Edward Hill, MD, president American Medical Association

2006

- Touro University, a medical school in California, revoked the charter of its LGBT student organization. After an outcry of protest from various groups, the school restored the group and school officials apologized.

2007

- The American Medical Student Association membership voted to create an action committee on LGBT health issues and elected Brian Hurley to the office of national vice-president, the first LGBT person to hold the office.
- The US Food and Drug Administration re-affirmed its policy prohibiting men who have sex with men (MSM) from donating blood despite recommendations from the American Red Cross, and the American Association of Blood Banks.
- James Holsinger was nominated by President George W. Bush to be US surgeon general. Because of Holsinger's alleged support of the ex-gay movement, his nomination drew sharp criticism from groups like the Gay and Lesbian Medical Association and the Human Rights Campaign.

2013

- The National Library of Medicine created the medical subject heading "Homophobia". The new medical topic was meant to catalog scientific reporting on "Differential treatment or unequal access to opportunities or services based on perceived homosexual preference or orientation."

2014

- The American Medical Association elected its first LGBTQ officer, Jesse Ehrenfeld to its Board of Trustees.

2019

- The American Psychoanalytic Association apologized for having treated homosexuality as a mental illness.

== See also ==
- List of LGBT medical organizations
- Homosexuality and psychology
- Homosexuality in DSM
