= GLADD =

British association for LGBTQ+ doctors and dentists

- The Association of LGBTQ+ Doctors and Dentists
- Predecessor: Lesbian & Gay Medical Association
- Formation: April 1, 1995; 31 years ago
- Founded at: London
- Type: Voluntary association
- Purpose: Support and advocacy for LGBTQ+ medical and dental professionals
- Fields: Medicine and Dentistry
- Co-Chairs: Raphael Kohn & Julia Alsop (2026)
- Affiliations: National Council for Voluntary Organisations
- Website: https://gladd.co.uk
- Formerly called: Gay & Lesbian Association of Doctors and Dentists

The Association of LGBTQ+ Doctors and Dentists, more commonly known as GLADD, is a voluntary association in the United Kingdom which represents doctors, dentists, dental students, and medical students who identify as LGBTQ+. The organisation provides professional and social support to LGBT medical and dental professionals, as well as campaigning for and raising awareness of LGBT issues as they relate to medicine and dentistry, such as homophobia or transphobia in medical care or in the workplace, blood donation restrictions on men who have sex with men, gender-affirming care, and discrimination against people with HIV/AIDS. Established in 1995 as the Gay & Lesbian Association of Doctors and Dentists, the organisation brought together several previous groups representing LGBTQ+ medical and dental professionals.

== History ==
The roots of the association lie with the Gay Medics and Dentals Society of the University of London Union, established by Martin Hamilton-Farrell in 1975 to support gay and lesbian clinical students at the university, a role in which it participated in some of the earliest pride marches in London and distributed posters stating "you are not alone" across the London medical schools, as well as to advocate for the health needs of gays and lesbians to medical professionals across London, regularly sending information booklets and questionnaires to medical professionals (in particular doctors in psychiatry, obstetrics & gynaecology, and sexual health) testing their knowledge of homosexuality. One of its main acts was to distribute the "Guide to counselling agencies for homosexual people in London" in December 1977 to over 10,000 GPs and consultants across London. The society was at times criticised by the more radical Gay Liberation Front for elitism amongst its mainly middle and upper-class members. At its peak, the organisation had over 150 members, the list of which was kept strictly confidential for well-founded fears that the release of information of members' sexualities would prove career-destroying. Eventually, in 1978 the society closed after the majority of its members had graduated and were unable to maintain it under the pressure of junior doctor work life.

In 1980, both the British Medical Journal and the British Dental Journal refused to publish an advertisement by the Gay Medics and Dentists Group in Scotland on the grounds that its publication would be offensive to the majority of the BMA and BDA's members; in response, Dr Hamilton-Farrell published an open letter in the BMJ criticising the decision, calling it offensive to gay doctors and patients alike and calling for greater acceptance of gay and lesbian doctors amongst the profession. This letter was well received, and in response Hamilton-Farrell founded the Gay Medical Information Society alongside fellow gay doctor David Harvey, which in 1983 would become the Gay Medical Association, at which time its membership was reported as approximately 150 members. Around the same time, the association published the leaflet "AIDS: Acquired Immune Deficiency Syndrome" in response to some of the first HIV/AIDS cases in the UK, possibly the first leaflet of its kind in the country; it was distributed in gay bars and nightclubs across the country, however only one print run was produced as the printer (who also produced gay pornography) was raided by the police after the first run, and the remaining leaflets were confiscated and destroyed under the Obscene Publications Act. Further attempts to produce a leaflet in cooperation with the Health Education Council were rebuffed, but that same year the association partnered with the Terrence Higgins Trust and London Lesbian and Gay Switchboard to host the first public conference on HIV/AIDS in the country in Conway Hall, and the year after produced a second leaflet also supported by the THT.

In 1986, the GMA hosted the first international conference on Homosexuality and Medicine at the Royal Society of Medicine in conjunction with the American Association of Physicians for Human Rights. This brought new publicity and prestige to the association, who then played a key role in the founding of Stonewall in 1989, a prolific LGBTQ+ rights organisation in the UK to this day; Peter Rivas, the then-chair of the association became a founding member of Stonewall, and the association contributed funds to the Stonewall's establishment. The early 1980s also saw the establishment of Women in Medicine (a radical alternative to the mainstream Medical Women's Federation) by lesbian doctor Susan Bewley, who saw the GMA as too male-dominated; in response, and to recognise its lesbian members, the GMA changed its name to the Lesbian and Gay Medical Association in 1988.

In 1994, the modern Gay & Lesbian Association of Doctors and Dentists was formed as a new organisation, however it largely absorbed the funds and membership of the LGMA alongside other smaller organisations established for gay and lesbian medical and dental professionals; the new organisation, formally established by constitution in 1995, aimed to be more accepting, as highlighted by the inclusion of lesbians and dentists within the name, as well as the appointment of Dr Bewley as one of the new co-chairs.

In 2010, Dr Harvey, the co-founder of the original LGMA, died of a chest infection and complications of his Parkinson's Disease; to honour his contributions, the annual prize of GLADD was subsequently named the David Harvey Award, which continues to be awarded every year to doctors and dentists who have made significant contributions towards LGBTQ+ health. Finally, in 2020, the organisation was renamed to the LGBTQ+ Association for Doctors and Dentists to better represent its role in advocacy for all LGBTQ+ medical and dental professionals, including bisexual and transgender medics and dentists (which it had been undertaking for some time), however the association continues to primarily go by the initialism GLADD to this day.

== Organisation & Aims ==
Today, GLADD exists to build community and provide support for LGBTQ+ medical and dental professionals across the UK, as well as to promote better understanding of LGBTQ+ issues as they relate to healthcare. The association's specific aims are:

- To provide professional and social support for LGBTQ+ doctors, dentists and medical and dental students,
- To collect and disseminate information on LGBTQ+ issues relevant to the practice of medicine and dentistry, and
- To combat discrimination against LGBTQ+ people, particularly if expressed by doctors and dentists or toward doctors and dentists.

The association is headed by an executive committee elected by its members; it hosts an annual general meeting each year, at which the executive committee members are elected, accounts and executive reports are presented, and at which members may propose resolutions to be voted on by the membership. Membership is open to any doctor, dentist, dental student, or medical student who identifies as LGBTQ+ and/or who supports the aim of the organisation, however special membership is also available to those who are not in any of the above professions but who are involved in healthcare or medical/dental education and are involved in LGBTQ+ advocacy, as well as honorary membership which can be bestowed by the executive committee to recognise contributions to LGBTQ+ health. The executive committee is supported by an advisory group which establishes working groups for various projects and has representatives for minority subsets of the membership, such as women, transgender members, students, and retired members. The association is also a member of the National Council for Voluntary Organisations

== Activities ==
GLADD plays a significant educational role in the UK, delivering talks to employers, health organisations, and the public educating them on LGBTQ+ issues; in particular, the association often delivers talks for healthcare students promoting inclusive practice and providing information about LGBTQ+ specific topics in healthcare, such as gender-affirming healthcare and inclusive sexual health services. The association also produces a curriculum guide for course directors to help them broach LGBTQ+ issues in a useful and sensitive manner.

GLADD also has a significant activism role, often responding to topical LGBTQ+ issues in the health field by publishing responses and petitioning organisations and the government to enact change. Some issues the association has undertaken activism regarding include:

- Support for a comprehensive trans-inclusive ban on conversion therapy
- Support for free access to and greater provision of gender-affirming healthcare
- EDI roles alongside the General Medical Council and Professional Standards Authority
- Periodic surveys on the experience of LGBTQ+ medical and dental professionals
- Support for formal apologies from regulators for historical license sanctions against LGBTQ+ medical and dental professionals
- Support for easing blood donation restrictions on men who have sex with men
- Support for the disclosure of pronouns on ID badges, letters, and emails in health settings

In 2024, the association responded to the Cass Review; it expressed concern at what it called "a significant disconnect" between the evidence reviewed in the body of the report and the report's conclusions, as well as "narratives which may implicitly pathologise trans and non-binary identities", a preference for biological determinism, and "an ingrained bias against the autonomy of trans people" throughout the narrative text. It also heavily criticised a supporting BMJ article which compared gender-affirming healthcare to gay conversion therapy.

== See also ==
- LGBTQ health
- LGBTQ rights in the United Kingdom
- Transgender rights in the United Kingdom
- Anti-transgender movement in the United Kingdom

=== Similar organisations ===
- List of LGBTQ medical organizations
- Association of LGBTQ Psychiatrists
- GLMA: Health Professionals Advancing LGBTQ+ Equality
- Gay Doctors Ireland
