= National LGBT Cancer Network =

Organization supporting LGBT cancer victims

The National LGBT Cancer Network Logo

The National LGBTQI+ Cancer Network (formerly called "The National LGBT Cancer Network") is a nonprofit organization launched in September 2007. It is one of the first programs in the United States that addresses the needs of lesbian, gay, bisexual and transgender (LGBTQ) cancer survivors and those at risk and the only one founded and directed by members of the LGBT community. The Network was founded by Liz Margolies, LCSW.

== Establishment ==
There are a number of local lesbian cancer programs and national lesbian health organizations such as the Mautner Project. The National LGBT Cancer Network contains an online cancer screening and referral program, entitled "Take Care of That Body", original articles on cancer risks and survivorship experiences of the LGBT community, and links to resources for both LGBT people and health professionals.

The Network aims to educate the LGBT community of increased cancer risks and the importance of early screening and detection, to offer training initiatives for healthcare providers, and to advocate for the inclusion of the LGBT community in national cancer organizations, research, and media.

== Recent work with the NYC Health and Hospitals Corporation ==
In 2010, the National LGBT Cancer Network was selected to develop an LGBT cultural competence in healthcare curriculum that became mandatory for all 38,000 employees of the municipal hospital system.

== Cancer in the LGBT community ==
Lesbians, gay men and transgender men and women experience disparities in availability of health insurance and are considered to be at increased risk for multiple types of cancer, based on behaviors such as high smoking and drinking rates, high fat diet, receptive anal intercourse and positive HIV status. Increased risks are coupled with decreased screening behaviors, resulting in cancers being detected at a later stage when it is more difficult to treat. Decreased screening is linked to lower insurance rates and perceived homophobia in health care. LGBT people experience extra challenges in cancer survivorship, including acceptance of their families by oncologists and emergency rooms and information about the effect of treatment on sexuality, relationships and fertility.

== See also ==
- List of LGBT medical organizations
