= Rail transportation in the Greater Manila Area =

Greater Capital Region Railway System
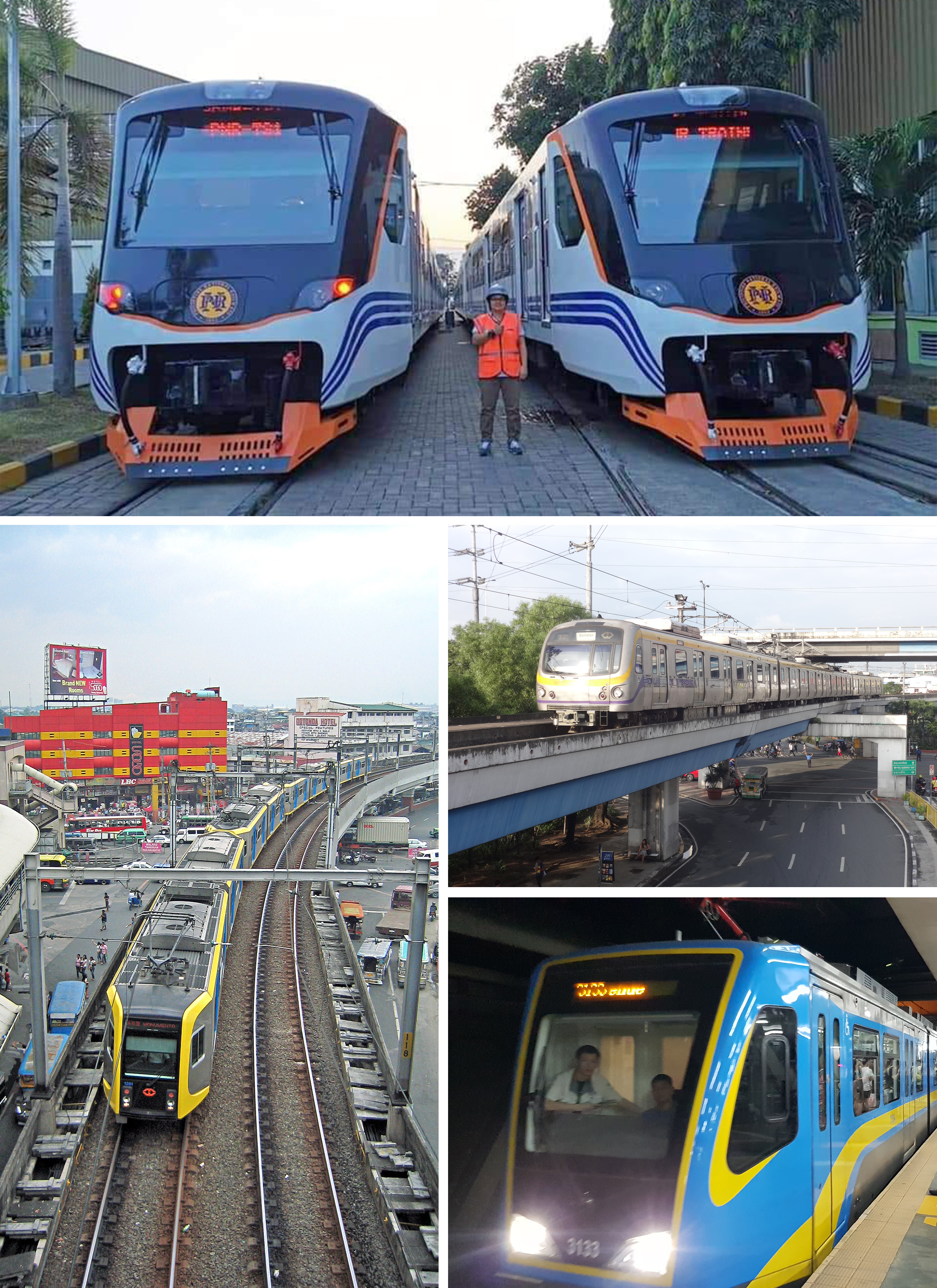
- Clockwise (from top): PNR Metro Commuter, LRT Line 2, MRT Line 3, LRT Line 1

Overview
- Owner: Government of the Philippines; Department of Transportation
- Locale: Greater Manila Area, Philippines
- Transit type: Urban rail transit
- Number of lines: 9 (4 currently operational)
- Number of stations: 63 (operational)
- Daily ridership: 845,000 (2024)
- Annual ridership: 304 million (2024)

Technical
- System length: 60.2 km (37.4 mi) (operational); 232.36 km (144.38 mi) (under construction)
- Track gauge: 1,067 mm (3 ft 6 in) (PNR); 1,435 mm (4 ft 8 1/2 in) standard gauge (current and future lines)

The rail transportation in the Greater Manila Area is a major part of the transportation system in Metro Manila and its surrounding areas. The railway network, collectively known as the Greater Capital Region Railway System, consists of the Manila Light Rail Transit System (LRT), Manila Metro Rail Transit System (MRT), and Philippine National Railways lines within the region.

The network makes up the majority of active railways in the country and bear the brunt of providing the metropolis with rail as a faster alternative mode of transport other than buses and jeepneys. However, these systems are currently insufficient for the rapidly expanding metropolis; to address this, new lines and line extensions are under construction, which will extend the system far out into neighboring regions.

== Network ==
There are three primary rail systems in the region:

- Manila Light Rail Transit System (LRT) – owned by the Light Rail Transit Authority, a government-owned and controlled corporation under the Department of Transportation.
- Manila Metro Rail Transit System (MRT) – includes lines not owned by the LRTA, such as MRT Line 3 and MRT Line 7.
- Philippine National Railways – includes the PNR Metro Commuter Line from Governor Pascual station in Malabon to IRRI station in Laguna. Both North and South commuter lines closed in 2024 to give way for the construction of the North–South Commuter Railway.

In 2024, the system served 845,000 passengers daily on average.

All lines are open every day of the year from 4:30 am PST (UTC+8) at the earliest until 10:15 pm at the latest. During Holy Week, a public holiday in the Philippines, the rail system is closed for annual maintenance, owing to fewer commuters and traffic around the metro. Normal operation resumes after Easter Sunday. During the Christmas and year-end holidays, the operating hours of the system are shortened due to the low ridership of the system during the holidays.

Line color	Line name	Opened	Last extension	Termini		Stations	Length	Type
Rapid transit lines
Green	LRT Line 1	December 1, 1984	November 16, 2024	Fernando Poe Jr.	Dr. Santos	25	25.7 km (16.0 mi)	Light rail
Purple	LRT Line 2	April 5, 2003	July 5, 2021	Recto	Antipolo	13	17.6 km (10.9 mi)	Heavy rail
Yellow	MRT Line 3	December 15, 1999	—	North Avenue	Taft Avenue	13	16.9 km (10.5 mi)	Light rail
Orange	MRT Line 4	2033 (projected)	—	EDSA	Taytay	10	15.56 km (9.67 mi)	Heavy rail
Maroon	MRT Line 7	2027 (projected)	—	North EDSA	San Jose Del Monte	14	22.8 km (14.2 mi)	Heavy rail
Blue	Metro Manila Subway	2032 (projected)	—	East Valenzuela	Bicutan; NAIA Terminal 3	17	36 km (22 mi)	Heavy rail
Philippine National Railways lines
Red	North–South Commuter Railway	2027 (West Valenzuela to Malolos); 2028 (Malolos to Clark International Airport); 2032 (full operations)	—	New Clark City (Note: Located outside of the Greater Manila Area.); Clark International Airport	Calamba	36	147 km (91 mi)	Commuter rail
Orange	Inter-Provincial Commuter	October 7, 2022	—	Calamba	Lucena	3	86 km (53 mi)	Commuter rail
Other rail lines
TBD	SkyTrain	—	—	Guadalupe	Uptown Bonifacio	2	TBD	People mover
Lines and stations in italics are either under construction, not yet operational, or have been closed.

=== Stations ===
There are 63 operational stations on the Greater Manila Area's rail network, with 38 from the LRT's two lines, 13 from the MRT's one line, and 12 from the PNR. There were also previously 35 operational PNR stations, but operations were suspended to give way for the construction of the North–South Commuter Railway (NSCR). In the future, 88 new stations are under construction and are planned to be opened: 39 for the MRT, 8 for the LRT, and 36 for the PNR, bringing the total to 146 stations. (Note: Six future stations of the PNR are located outside of the Greater Manila Area. However, these stations are still considered part of the rail network and are listed below.)

All stations, except for Antipolo and the 12 operational stations of the PNR, are situated within Metro Manila, with several future stations planned for the surrounding regions. Six stations serve as interchanges where commuters can switch lines. However, these stations are distinct structures from one another and are considered independent of each other.

Stations often derive their names from the streets or localities they serve. Consequently, it is possible for two separate stations to have identical names even though they are not in proximity to each other. For instance, the PNR EDSA station is situated near the Magallanes Interchange, while the LRT EDSA station can be found on the intersection between Taft Avenue and EDSA.

== Administration ==
The administration of the region's railway network is overseen by the national government's Department of Transportation (DOTr). However, each line is operated and managed by a different entity. While the Light Rail Transit Authority owns the LRT, it only operates LRT Line 2, while LRT Line 1 is operated by the Light Rail Manila Corporation. Meanwhile, the lines under the MRT are owned and operated independently by several private companies; the Metro Rail Transit Corporation owns MRT Line 3 while SMC Mass Rail Transit 7 owns the MRT Line 7. As a result, each line in the network operates with its own infrastructure and system distinct from one another, creating a fragmented, "piecemeal" network.

Although the lines are unified by coordinated numbers, colors, and the Beep payment system for automated fare collection, the railway network remains loosely integrated, which has resulted in several issues. Interchanges between lines are poorly connected, requiring passengers to exit the paid area of one system, enter another, and pay a separate fare for each transfer. Furthermore, the lines display the network inconsistently across station maps, diagrams, and other informational materials.

== History ==
=== Early rail systems ===
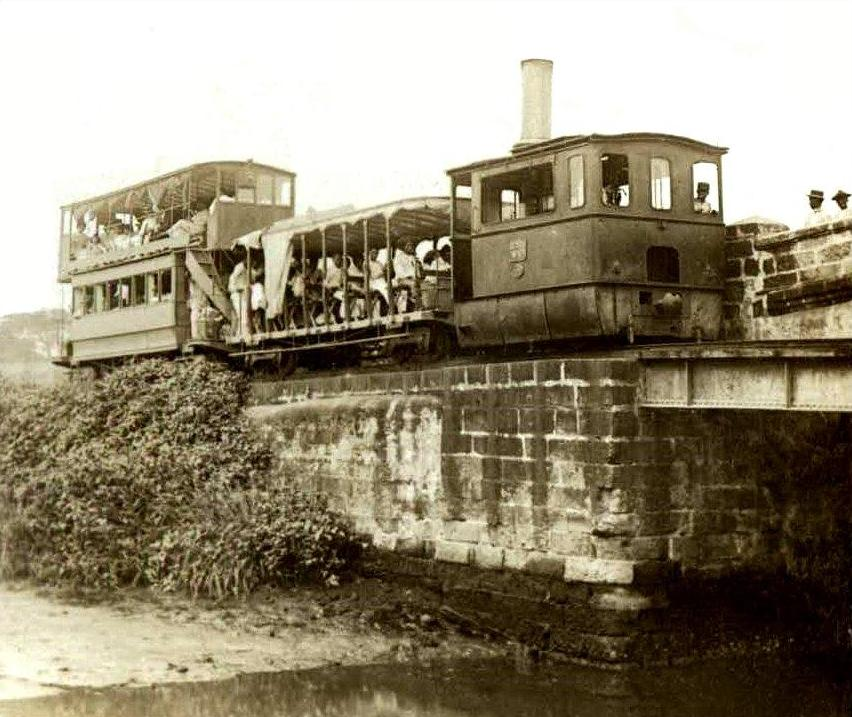
The first steam-powered trains in the country ran on the Malabon Tranvía line.

Rail transportation in the Manila area dates back to 1878 when an official from Spain's Department of Public Works for the Philippines submitted a proposal for a Manila streetcar system, now referred to as the Tranvía. The system proposed was a five-line network emanating from Plaza San Gabriel in Binondo, running to Intramuros, Malate, Malacañan Palace, Sampaloc and Tondo. The project was approved and in 1882, Spanish-German businessman Jacobo Zóbel de Zangroniz, Spanish engineer Luciano M. Bremon, and Spanish banker Adolfo Bayo, founded the Compañia de los Tranvias de Filipinas to operate the concession granted by the Spanish colonial government. The first line opened in the system, the Tondo line, would open on December 9, 1883, predating the Ferrocarril de Manila–Dagupan by nine years, serving as the first rail transport in the country. Numerous other lines would open in the following years; the Intramuros line would open in 1886, the Sampaloc line in 1887, and the Malabón line in 1888.

The Ferrocarril de Manila–Dagupan, which constitutes much of the PNR North Main Line today, began construction on July 31, 1887, with the laying of the cornerstone for Tutuban station, and the 195-kilometer (121 mi) line opened on November 24, 1892. Expansion of the Philippine railway network would not begin until the American colonial period, when on December 8, 1902, the Philippine Commission passed legislation authorizing the construction of another railway line from Manila to Southern Luzon.

=== American period ===
With the American takeover of the Philippines, legislation was passed in 1909 authorizing further railway construction and the use of government bonds to finance them, and by 1916, 792.5 kilometers (492.4 mi) of track had been built by the company, which had reorganized itself as the Manila Railroad Company of New Jersey (MRR). The Manila Railroad Company, which preceded the PNR, operated various local trains between Manila and its neighboring provinces. Trains from Tutuban lead to Naic in Cavite, Pagsanjan in Laguna, Montalban in Rizal, and Bulacan during the 1920s.

Meanwhile, the Philippine Commission allowed the Manila Electric Railroad and Light Company (Meralco) to take over the properties of the Compañia de los Tranvias de Filipinas, with the first of twelve mandated electric tranvia (tram) lines operated by MERALCO opening in Manila in 1905. At the end of the first year around 63 kilometers (39 mi) of track had been laid. A five-year reconstruction program was initiated in 1920, and by 1924, 170 cars serviced many parts of the city and its outskirts. Although it was an efficient system for the city's 220,000 inhabitants, by the 1930s the streetcar network had stopped expanding. Much of the Tranvía network and rail services would be destroyed during World War II.

=== Post-war period ===
Following the war, the MRR was able to restore limited services, using surplus military equipment and payments made by the United States Army and the Philippine Commonwealth Army for use of railway facilities in the Philippines Campaign. However, the tram network was damaged beyond repair and was dismantled; jeepneys became the city's primary form of transportation, plying the routes once served by the tram lines. With the return of buses and cars to the streets, traffic congestion became a problem.

In 1966, the Philippine government granted a franchise to Philippine Monorail Transport Systems (PMTS) for the operation of an inner-city monorail. The monorail's feasibility was still being evaluated when the government asked the Japan International Cooperation Agency (JICA) to conduct a separate transport study. Prepared between 1971 and 1973, the JICA study proposed a series of circumferential and radial roads, an inner-city rapid transit system, a commuter railway, and an expressway with three branches. After further examination, many recommendations were adopted; however, none of them involved rapid transit and the monorail was never built. PMTS' franchise subsequently expired in 1974.

Meanwhile, the MRR's successor, the Philippine National Railways, opened its commuter service from Manila North Harbor to Biñan, Laguna. During this decade, more stations were opened although some were either closed or relocated. In 1976, the commuter system peaked and extended as far north as San Fernando, Pampanga, Guadalupe (located in Mandaluyong on the other side of Pasig River) to the east, and College to the south. There were also services in the now-defunct Carmona branch line.

Another study was performed between 1976 and 1977, this time by Freeman Fox and Associates and funded by the World Bank. It originally suggested a street-level railway, but its recommendations were revised by the newly formed Ministry of Transportation and Communications (now the Department of Transportation). The ministry instead called for an elevated system because of the city's many intersections. However, the revisions increased the price of the project from ₱1.5 billion to ₱2 billion. A supplementary study was conducted and completed within three months.

In 1978, at the request of the Philippine government, the Japan International Cooperation Agency conducted a study on the electrification of the PNR's north and south commuter lines in Metro Manila. The plan, formulated to keep up with the increasing demand for transportation in the Manila area, called for the replacement of the diesel-run trains and the electrification of the PNR commuter line. Two experts from the Japanese National Railways were sent to conduct the study.

=== Introduction of rapid transit ===
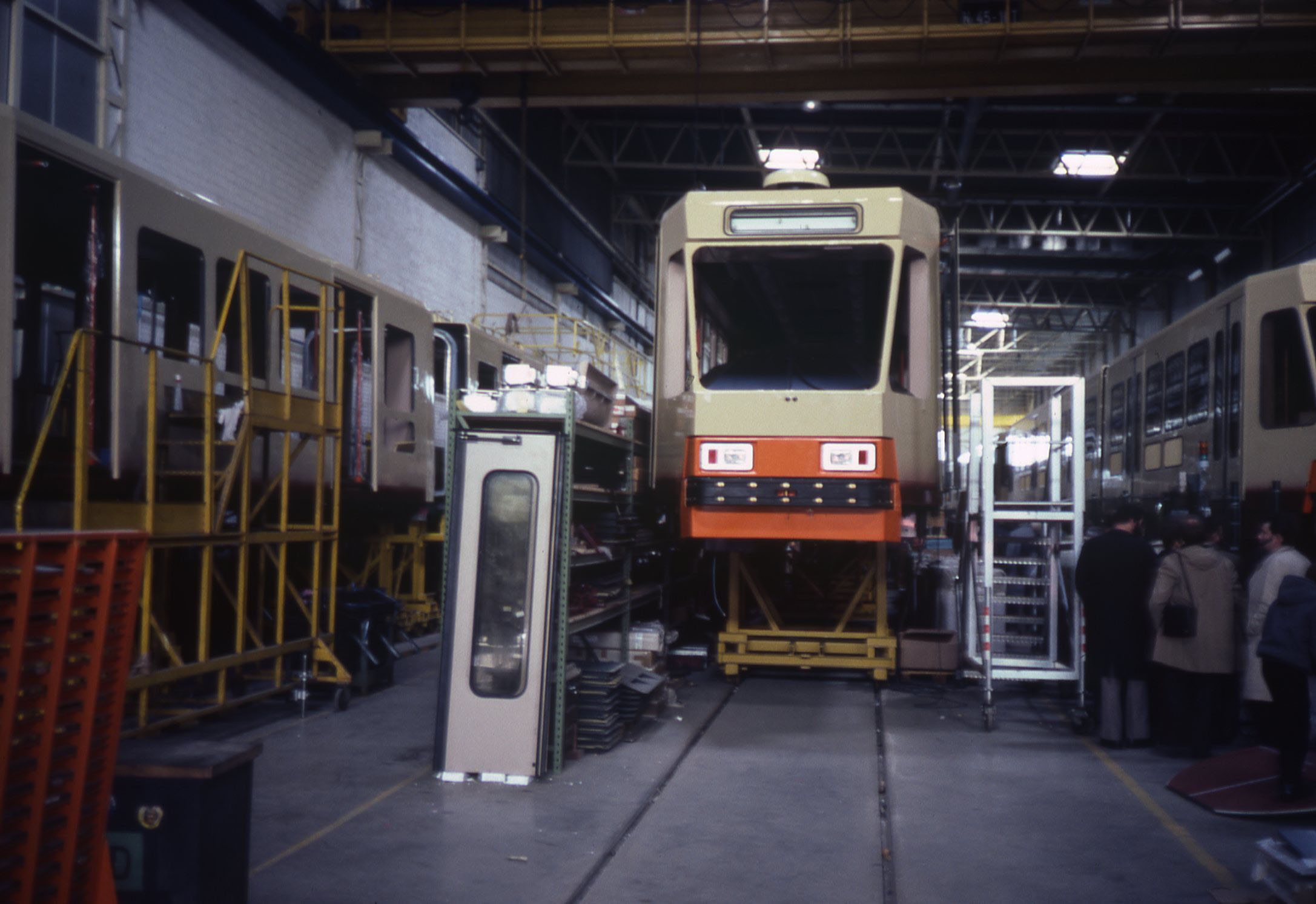
LRTA Class 1000 being built in Bruges in 1982

President Ferdinand Marcos created the Light Rail Transit Authority (LRTA) on July 12, 1980, by virtue of Executive Order No. 603 giving birth to what was then dubbed the "Metrorail". Construction of Metrorail started in September 1981. The line was test-run in March 1984, and the first half of the line from Baclaran to Central Terminal was opened on December 1, 1984. With the opening of its first segment, LRT Line 1 became the first rapid transit service in Southeast Asia. The second half, from Central Terminal to Monumento, was opened on May 12, 1985. Overcrowding and poor maintenance resulted in the system's inefficiency and disruptions to operations. The premature aging of Line 1 led to an extensive refurbishing and structural capacity expansion program with the help of Japan's ODA.

During the construction of the LRT Line 1, Electrowatt Engineering Services of Zürich also designed a comprehensive plan for metro service in Metro Manila. The plan—still used as the basis for planning new metro lines—consisted of a 150-kilometer (93 mi) network of rapid transit lines spanning all major corridors within 20 years. The plan would be revised in 1999 as the Metro Manila Urban Transportation Integration Study by the Japan International Cooperation Agency.

In the 1993 Updated Traffic and Transport Management Plan, which proposes the network of five LRT lines that were approved in 1995:

- LRT-1: Baclaran to Monumento, 15 km; existing
- LRT-2: Old Bilibid to Katipunan, 11.76 km
- LRT-3: Monumento to F.B. Harrison, 22 km
- LRT-4: Welcome Rotonda to Novaliches, 18.35 km
- LRT-5: España Boulevard to Shaw/EDSA, 7.55 km
- LRT-6: Baclaran to Zapote, 8 km

For the 1995 and 1999 MMUTIS master plans of a network, which revise the routes, they are:

- LRT-1: Baclaran to Monumento, 15 km; existing
- LRT-2: Recto to Katipunan, 10 km, later extended to Santolan for 2 km (12 km) as part of its revision
- MRT-3: Monumento to Taft Avenue, 21 km
- LRT-4: Old Bilibid to Batasan, 15 km, including a 7 km extension to Novaliches
- LRT-5: Santa Mesa to Shaw/EDSA, 4 km, later removed from the government's project's list and omitted from the MMUTIS to merge with the extension of the planned Northrail
- LRT-6: Baclaran to Zapote, 8 km, but the actual route is 12–15 km, and this line leads to Imus.

The construction of the Metro Rail Transit system's first line, MRT Line 3, would officially began in 1989 under the name "LRT-3" with the Hong Kong-based EDSA LRT Corporation winning the public bidding for the line's construction during the term of President Corazon Aquino. However, construction could not commence, with the project stalled as the Philippine government conducted several investigations into alleged irregularities with the project's contract. In 1995, the Supreme Court upheld the regularity of the project (G.R. No. 114222, April 6, 1995) which paved the way for construction to finally begin during the term of President Fidel V. Ramos. A consortium of local companies, led by Fil-Estate Management was later joined by Ayala Land, and 5 others, later formed the Metro Rail Transit Corporation (MRTC) in June 1995 and took over the EDSA LRT Corporation. Construction began on October 15, 1996, with a BLT agreement signed between the Philippine government and the MRTC. On December 15, 1999, the initial section from North Avenue to Buendia was inaugurated by President Joseph Estrada.

In 1990, the PNR's commuter system underwent renovations under the working title of Metrotrak. By May of that year, the system was inaugurated as Metrotren to distinguish it from the LRT Line 1, then named "Metrorail". However, the Metrotren system eventually suffered neglect due to lack of funding and maintenance. Plans for expansion and rehabilitation such as the Manila–Clark rapid railway project and Guadalupe line revival was also never realized. In addition, numerous natural disasters and neglect forced the line from Manila to Northern Luzon to close.

LRT Line 2 would begin construction in 1996, twelve years after the opening of LRT Line 1, with the granting of the soft loans for the line's construction. However, construction barely commenced, with the project stalled as the Philippine government conducted several investigations into alleged irregularities with the project's contract. The consortium of local and foreign companies, led by Marubeni Corporation, formed the Asia-Europe MRT Consortium (AEMC) which won the contract and restarted the project in 2000 after getting cleared from the allegations.

=== Expansion ===
Numerous rail projects would be completed in the early 2000s. On July 20, 2000, the rest of the MRT Line 3 stations opened a little over a month past the original deadline, due to DOTC's inclusion of additional work orders such as the Tramo overpass in Pasay leading to NAIA. Initially having low ridership due to high fares, the government subsidized fares to reduce the line's ticket prices, causing ridership to increase. On April 5, 2003, LRT Line 2's initial section, from Santolan to Araneta Center-Cubao was inaugurated by President Gloria Macapagal Arroyo, with all remaining stations opening on April 5, 2004, except for Recto which opened on October 29, 2004.

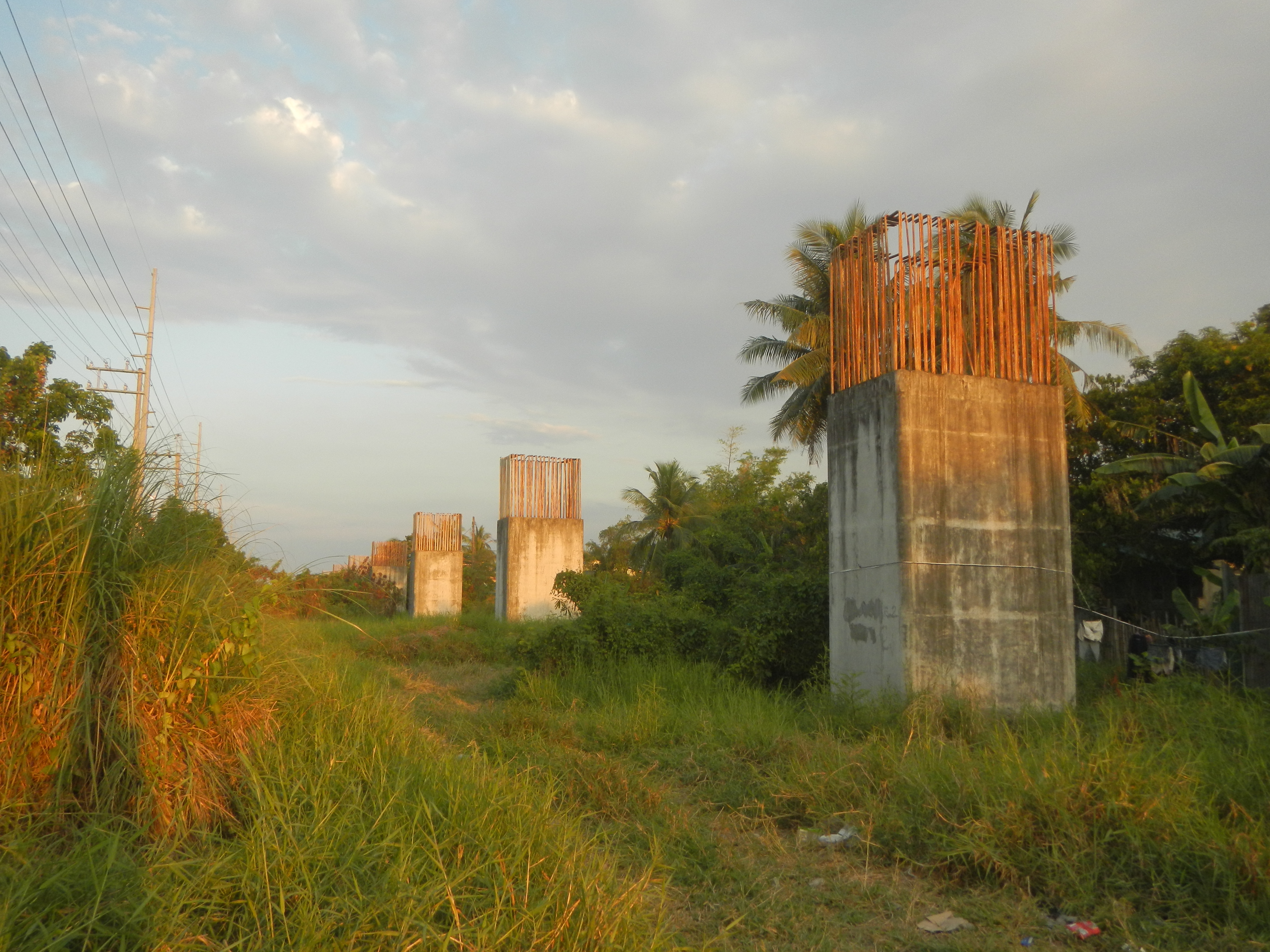
The NorthRail project was halted in 2011 and only a few pillars for the railway viaduct were built.

==== Rehabilitation of the PNR and Northrail ====
The Arroyo administration attempted to modernize the PNR system by rebuilding the lines and purchasing new rolling stock. PNR purchased 6 brand new diesel multiple units from South Korea and became its first order in 35 years. The government also started the Northrail project, which would have revived the North Main Line from Tutuban to Malolos, with the first phase covering Caloocan to Malolos segment. The project was estimated to cost around US$500 million, and the funding was to be covered by a US$400 million by the Export–Import Bank of China, and the rest to be shouldered by the government through BCDA and NLRC. However, due to allegations of overpricing and other problems, the line's construction was repeatedly halted, until it was finally discontinued in 2011. The succeeding Aquino administration rebuilt the stations along the line to accommodate high-floor trains. PNR also acquired second-hand multiple units from Japan as stopgap measures to its train fleet, ending the Metrotren era.

==== Strong Republic Transit System ====
The Strong Republic Transit System was launched in 2004 to integrate the various rail lines providing public transport in Manila in the Philippines. The program was initiated by former president Gloria Macapagal-Arroyo on June 14, 2003. It aimed to provide a "reliable, seamless and integrated mass transit system that would be at par with international standards" through the unification of already-existing rail infrastructure under one transit system and fare structure. The Manila Light Rail Transit System (Line 1 and Line 2), the Manila Metro Rail Transit System (Line 3) and the Philippine National Railways (PNR) Northrail and Southrail lines were covered by the SRTS project.

These are the existing and proposed lines under the SRTS:

- LRT-1: Baclaran to Monumento and the extensions to North Avenue (its future terminus) and Cavite
- LRT-2: Recto to Antipolo and the Pier 4 and planned Cogeo extension
- MRT-3: North Avenue (later on North Triangle Common Station) to Taft Avenue
- MRT-4: EDSA Shrine to Taytay/Angono
- MRT-7: North Triangle CS to San Jose del Monte and planned extensions to western, eastern and northern Metro Manila
- MRT-8: Lerma-Quezon Boulevard to UP Campus, may use portions of MRT-7 line
- Metro Manila Subway: Valenzuela to Newport City with spur line to PTIX and planned integration branch with NSCR
- Under North-South Commuter Railway and ground level diesel services of PNR:
  - Northrail: Caloocan/Tutuban to Clark International/New Clark City
  - Southrail: Caloocan/Tutuban to Calamba with planned Batangas extension

=== Contemporary history ===
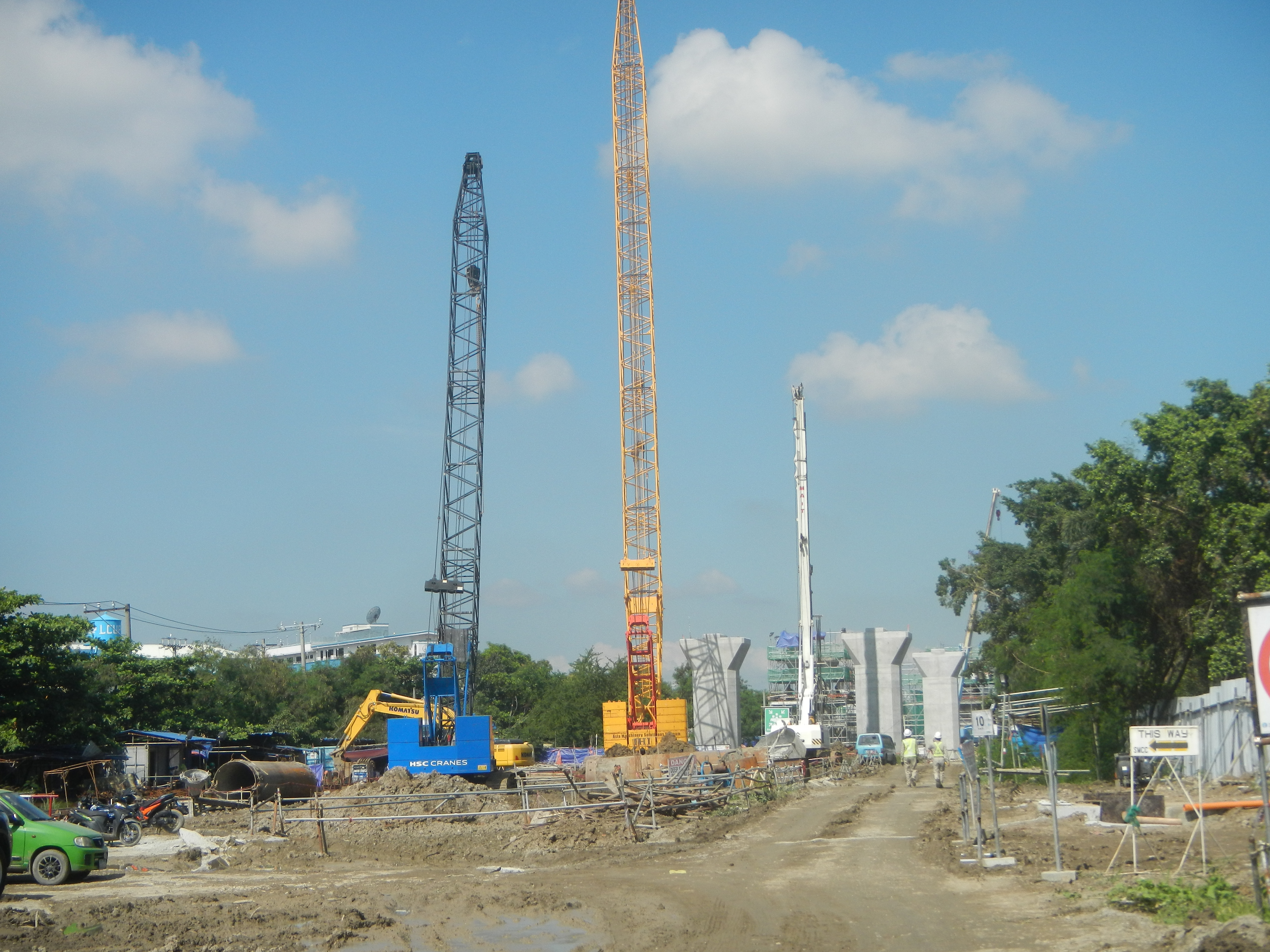
Construction of the North–South Commuter Railway in Malolos, Bulacan.

Numerous extensions to the existing lines would be opened beginning in 2010. The construction of LRT Line 1's north extension to Roosevelt began in 2007 and would be completed by 2010. Originally supposed to end at North Avenue, bureaucracy in the Department of Transportation, corporate feud, and issues related to its proposed location hindered the station's construction, which would only begin in 2017. However following the termination of its contractor due to repeated delays, resulted to opening date pushed back to 2027. LRT Line 1 would also be privatized in 2015. Construction of another extension of the line up to Cavite began in 2019, partially opening in 2024 until Sucat. On July 5, 2021, the east extension of the LRT Line 2, which began construction in 2015, was opened to the public. The extension adds the Marikina and Antipolo stations, with the latter being the first rail transit station to be opened outside of Metro Manila.

However, the early 2010s were also marked by the deterioration of some lines. PNR's commuter line in the region would further decline as services were further suspended to Santa Rosa in 2014, and to Alabang in 2015 due to safety issues and accidents on the line. The national government would later procure new rolling stock and rehabilitate the line, enabling services to Governor Pascual in the north and IRRI in the south to be reopened by 2019. Meanwhile, MRT Line 3 deteriorated due to poor maintenance and overcrowding. As a response, the government started procuring additional trainsets in 2013, with the first trainsets received in 2016. However, various compatibility issues and the line's poor condition led to the trainsets only being used in limited capacity beginning in 2020. The rehabilitation of the line started in 2019 and was completed in 2021.

Several new railway projects are being undertaken by the national government and the private sector. These include the North–South Commuter Railway, the Metro Manila Subway, and MRT Line 7, all of which are under construction. Other line extensions and railway lines are in the planning stage.

For the 2020s proposal, the Greater Capital Region Railway System consists of seven lines:

- LRT-1: North Triangle Common Station to Niog
- LRT-2: Pier 4 to Antipolo
- MRT-3: North Triangle Common Station to Taft Avenue
- MRT-4: EDSA/Ortigas Center to Taytay
- MRT-7: North Triangle Common Station to San Jose del Monte
- Metro Manila Subway: East Valenzuela to NAIA Terminal 3 and Bicutan
- North–South Commuter Railway: Clark to Calamba

Insiders within the DOTr indicate that completing major rail infrastructure before the end of President Bongbong Marcos' administration is improbable. This slowdown stems from a Department of Justice (DOJ) legal assessment that effectively frozen right of way procurement, sparing only active expropriation lawsuits and underground property acquisitions.

The adoption of bus rapid transit (BRT) is anticipated despite the delays in railway construction. The Institute for Transportation and Development Policy (ITDP)'s Gonggom Sitanggang stated “Metro Manila urgently needs a scalable, inclusive and efficient mass transport system. The BRT is a tested model that can be built faster and cheaper than rail, while still carrying more people than traditional bus systems.” According to Transportation Undersecretary Mark Steven Pastor, Katipunan Avenue is a potential candidate. Should this initiative prove successful, the metropolis will pivot away from the construction of elevated urban rail systems. This approach aligns with the precedent set by Bogota, which established an independent transit framework during the pre-development phase of its metro system.

== Rolling stock ==
The railway systems in the Greater Manila Area use multiple types of rolling stock.

=== Manila LRT ===
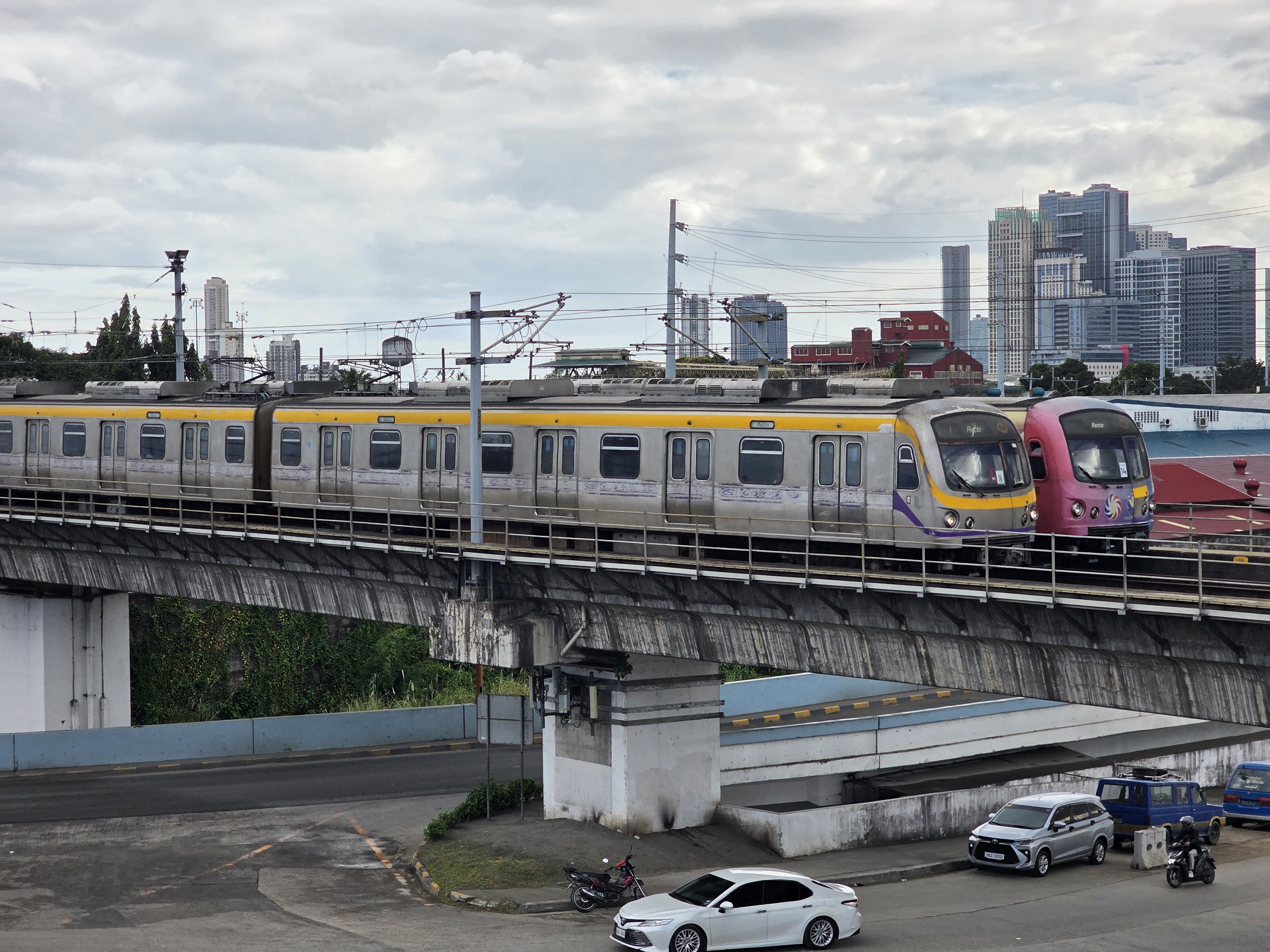
LRTA 2000 class trains near Santolan station

Five types of rolling stock run on the system, with three types used on Line 1 and another used on Line 2. Line 1 railway cars were made either in Belgium by La Bruggeoise et Nivelle, South Korea by Hyundai Precision and Adtranz (La bruggeoise et Nivelle and Adtranz are now part of Bombardier Transportation), Japan by Kinki Sharyo and Nippon Sharyo, or Spain by Construcciones y Auxiliar de Ferrocarriles. The Line 2, unlike the Line 1, runs heavy rail metro cars made in South Korea by Hyundai Rotem and provided by the Asia-Europe MRT Consortium led by Marubeni Corporation that have higher passenger capacity and maximum speed. All four types of rolling stock are powered by electricity supplied through overhead wires.

Of the two LRTA lines, the Line 2 prominently employs wrap advertising in its rolling stock. LRT Line 1 have also begun using wrap advertising as well initially for their second-generation trains, followed by their third and fourth-generation trains.

=== Manila MRT ===
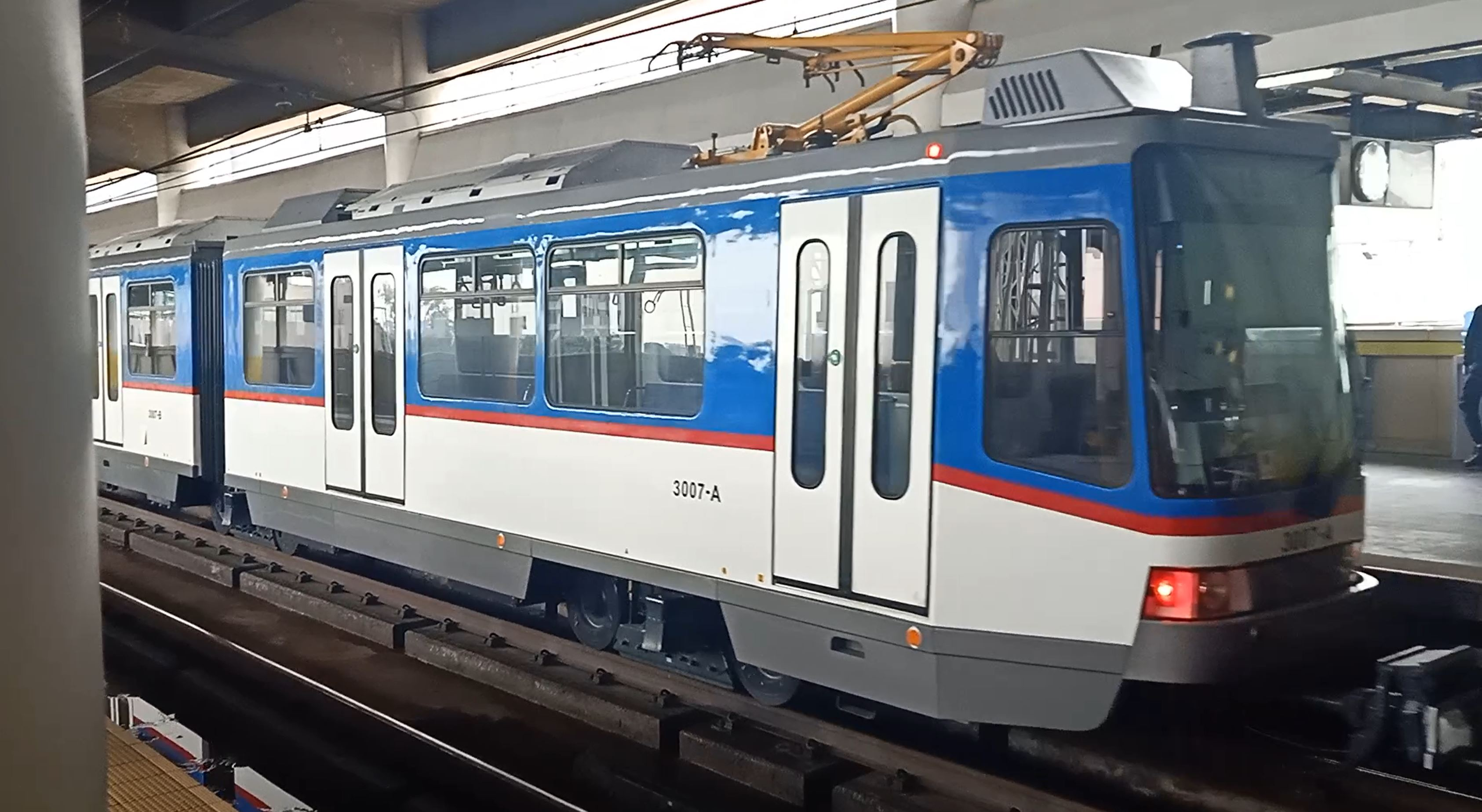
A newly overhauled MRTC 3000 class train at North Avenue station

Currently, the system uses two types of rolling stock on its single line, MRT Line 3. Like LRT Line 1, the line uses light rail vehicles. The first railway cars were manufactured by ČKD Tatra in 1999. The second railway cars, commonly referred to as the Dalian Train, were manufactured by CRRC Dalian in 2016. The deployment of the Dalian trainsets was delayed due to several factors, including weight limits on existing tracks and inconsistencies in production, which has since been corrected. Though some train cars have passed validation tests, none of the Dalian trains are in operation for daily revenue services.

The MRT Line 4, Line 7, and the Metro Manila Subway will use heavy rail metro cars unlike Line 3, with the trains of the Metro Manila Subway being similar to that of the North–South Commuter Railway.

=== Philippine National Railways ===
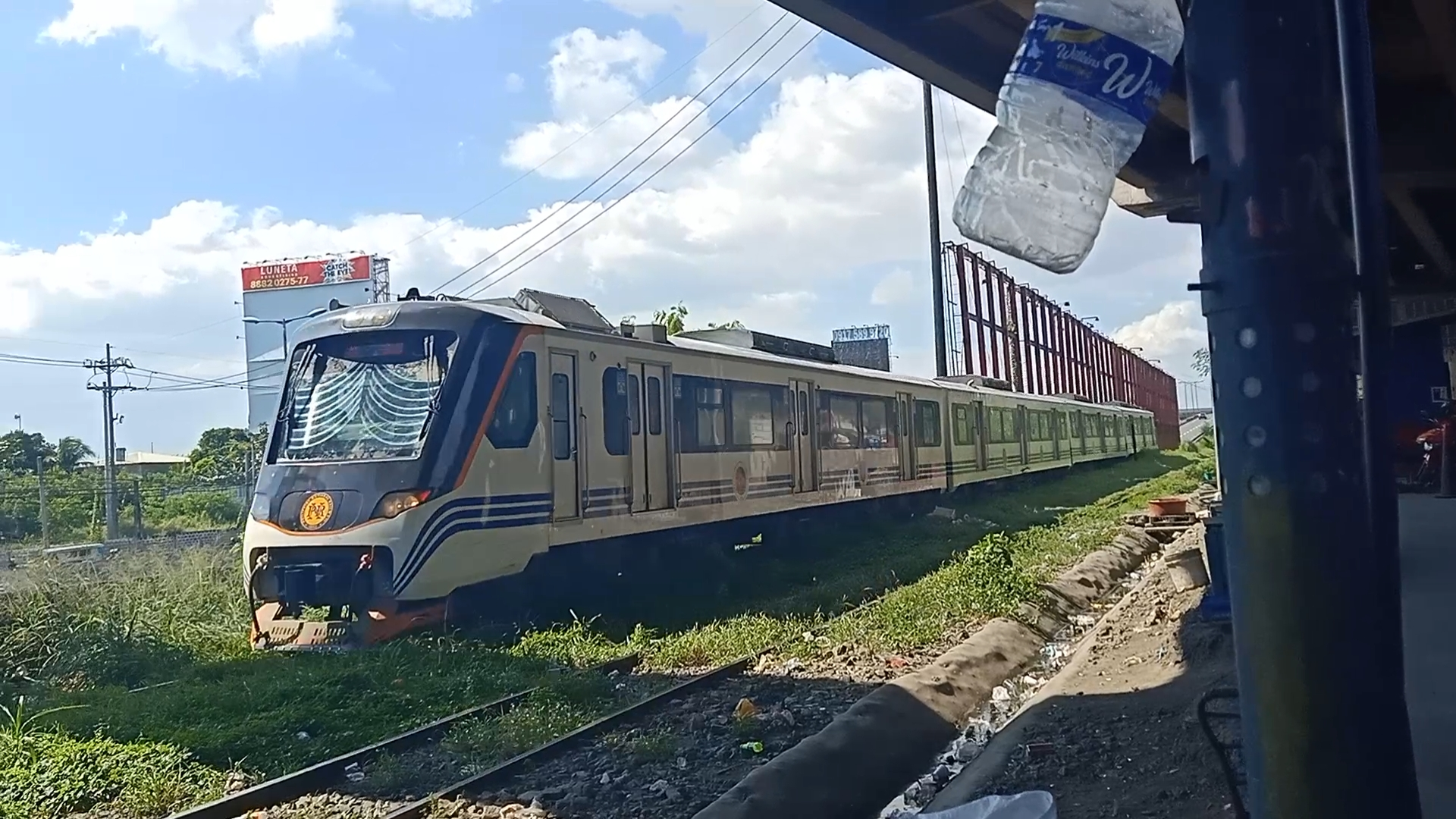
A PNR 8100 class train near FTI station

The Metro Commuter Line has always used diesel-powered rolling stock since the services were opened in 1970. There were no new orders until 2009 when PNR ordered the Hyundai Rotem DMUs, followed by second-hand multiple units and coaches from Japan. PNR later ordered 7 new trains from Indonesian manufacturer PT INKA in 2018, subsequently increased to 9. The DOST Hybrid Electric Train also entered trial service the same year. The agency then commenced the refurbishment of its entire fleet the following year, which introduced polycarbonate windows that can resist stoning as well as a new livery. After all the INKA trainsets have arrived and the refurbishment of older trains are completed, the Hyundai Rotem DMUs and the INKA trainsets will become the Metro Commuter fleet while the older Japanese trainsets will be transferred to the Bicol Region for its new commuter service unless PNR decides otherwise.

The North–South Commuter Railway will use a total of 464 electric multiple unit train cars, equivalent to 58 train sets. 104 of these are the thirteen 8-car EM10000 class trainsets being built by the Japan Transport Engineering Company (J-TREC), while the other 304 will also be built by J-TREC with the same design and specifications to the EM10000 class trains. The trainsets are based on JR East commuter stock such as the E233 series but adopted to standard gauge. The first commuter train arrived on November 21, 2021. On the other hand, an order for 56 airport express trainsets (7 sets) was awarded to Mitsubishi Corporation and Spanish railcar manufacturer CAF in 2023.
