= John Nelson (physician) =

American physician

John C. Nelson is a physician who served as president of the American Medical Association.

== Tenure as president ==
While president of the American Medical Association in 2005, he was quoted supporting New York Medical College's decision to ban a gay student group. The college is affiliated with New York's Roman Catholic archdiocese. He later said his remarks were misrepresented. The AMA officially came out against the ban.

Following Nelson's comments, the Gay and Lesbian Medical Association requested a meeting with the AMA leadership regarding his comments and the NYMC decision. According to the AMA, Nelson apologized for his comments and gave his support for addressing issues important to gay, lesbian, bisexual and transgender (GLBT) physicians. The AMA agreed to include LGBT health in its Commission to End Health Care Disparities, which had previously focused on race and ethnicity.

Nelson was succeeded as AMA president by Edward Hill.

In 2008, Nelson was appointed to the Whole Child Committee for the national children's charity Operation Kids.
