= List of LGBTQ medical organizations =

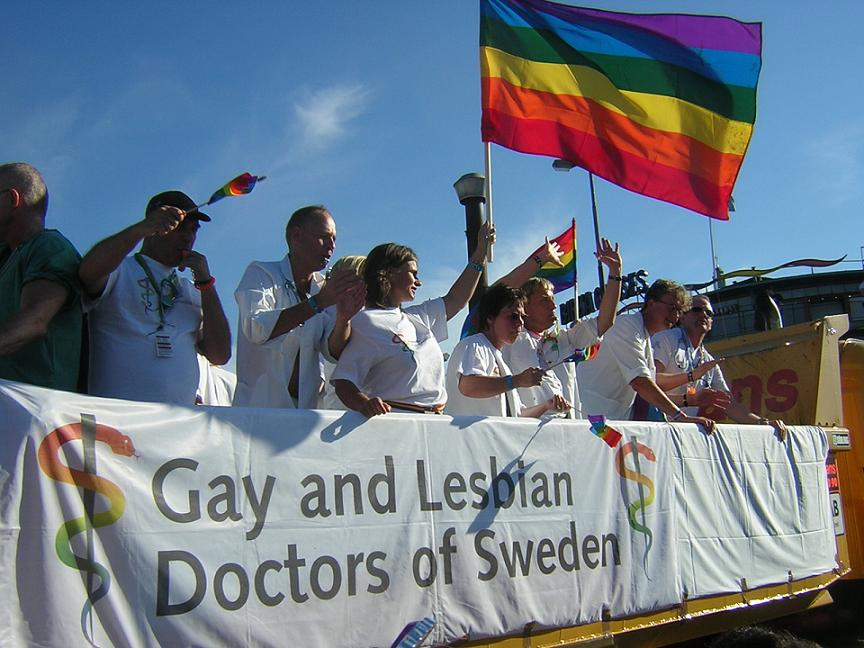
Gay and Lesbian Doctors of Sweden at an LGBT pride event

LGBTQ medical organizations, consisting of lesbian, gay, bisexual, transgender and queer (LGBTQ) medical professionals, promoting LGBTQ health, or supportive and affirming of the LGBTQ community, are worldwide.

== International ==
- GLMA: Health Professionals Advancing LGBTQ+ Equality
- World Professional Association for Transgender Health

== Australia and Oceania ==
=== Australia ===
- LGBTIQ+ Health Australia

== Europe ==
=== Ireland ===
- Gay Doctors Ireland
- The Rainbow Project

=== United Kingdom ===
- LGBT Foundation
- CHAPS
- GMFA
- LGBTI Health Summit

== North America ==
=== United States ===
- Association of LGBTQ Psychiatrists
- Callen-Lorde Community Health Center
- Fenway Health
- Gay City Health Project
- GMHC
- Howard Brown Health
- LGBTI Health Summit
- Mazzoni Center
- The Mpowerment Project
- National LGBT Cancer Network
- UCSF Alliance Health Project
- Whitman-Walker Health

== See also ==
- Timeline of sexual orientation and medicine
