= Journal of the Gay and Lesbian Medical Association =

Peer-reviewed medical journal

- Discipline: Gay and Lesbian Health
- Language: English
- Edited by: Vincent Silenzio

Publication details
- History: 1997-2002
- Publisher: Springer Science+Business Media
- Frequency: Quarterly

Standard abbreviations
- ISO 4: J. Gay Lesbian Med. Assoc.

Indexing
- CODEN: JGLAFX
- ISSN: 1090-7173 (print); 1573-3637 (web)
- OCLC no.: 35446123

Links
- Journal homepage; Online access

The Journal of the Gay and Lesbian Medical Association was a peer-reviewed medical journal devoted to the healthcare needs of LGBT people, published by Plenum Publishing Corporation until 2002. The journal published a variety of clinical research, review articles, and essays. It was the official journal of the Gay and Lesbian Medical Association. Vincent Silenzio served as co-editor in chief.
