= Edward Hill (physician) =

American physician

John Edward Hill
- Born: Omaha, Nebraska
- Education: University of Mississippi
- Occupation: Physician

John Edward Hill is an American family physician in Tupelo, Mississippi.

== Early life and education ==
Born in Omaha, Nebraska, Hill was educated in the public schools of Vicksburg, Mississippi and received both his B.S. and M.D. degrees from the University of Mississippi.

== Career ==
A board certified family physician, Hill began his professional career in the rural Mississippi Delta where he practiced for 27 years. In addition to his full-service family practice, Hill developed and directed a local maternal child health program that resulted in lowering the fetal mortality rate from one of the highest in the United States to below the national average, where it remained. Hill was asked in January 1995 to become the director of the Family Practice Residency Program at North Mississippi Medical Center, which is the nation's largest rural hospital.

=== AMA president ===
In a speech entitled "Understanding, Advocacy, Leadership: The AMA Perspective on LGBT Health," Hill became the first president of the AMA to address the Gay and Lesbian Medical Association.

I know that GLMA members and LGBT physicians have been treated unfairly by the AMA in the past. There is simply no excuse for discriminatory actions or exclusions based on sexual orientation or gender identity -- none. First, GLMA has opened [the AMA's] eyes to the diverse needs of LGBT patients, and second -- and just as important -- GLMA has told patients that they have the right to expect a health care system filled with openness, fairness and equality."

— Edward Hill, M.D., president American Medical Association

His speech is considered by some as an historic turning point in the policy of the AMA's towards LGBT physicians after the events at New York Medical College during the tenure of the previous AMA president John Nelson.
