= Transportation in Metro Manila =

Overview of Metro Manila's transportation system

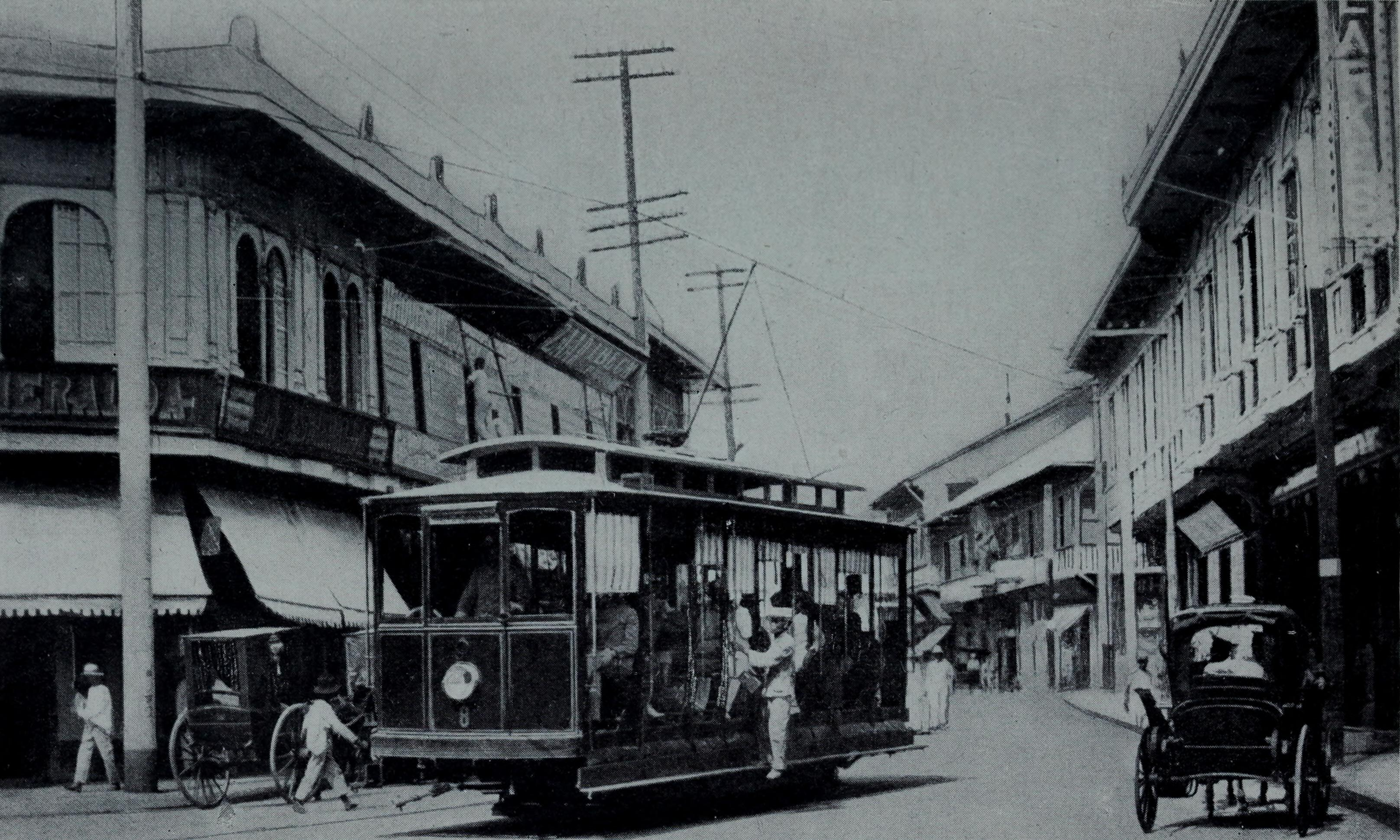
An American trolley in a Manila street, 1905

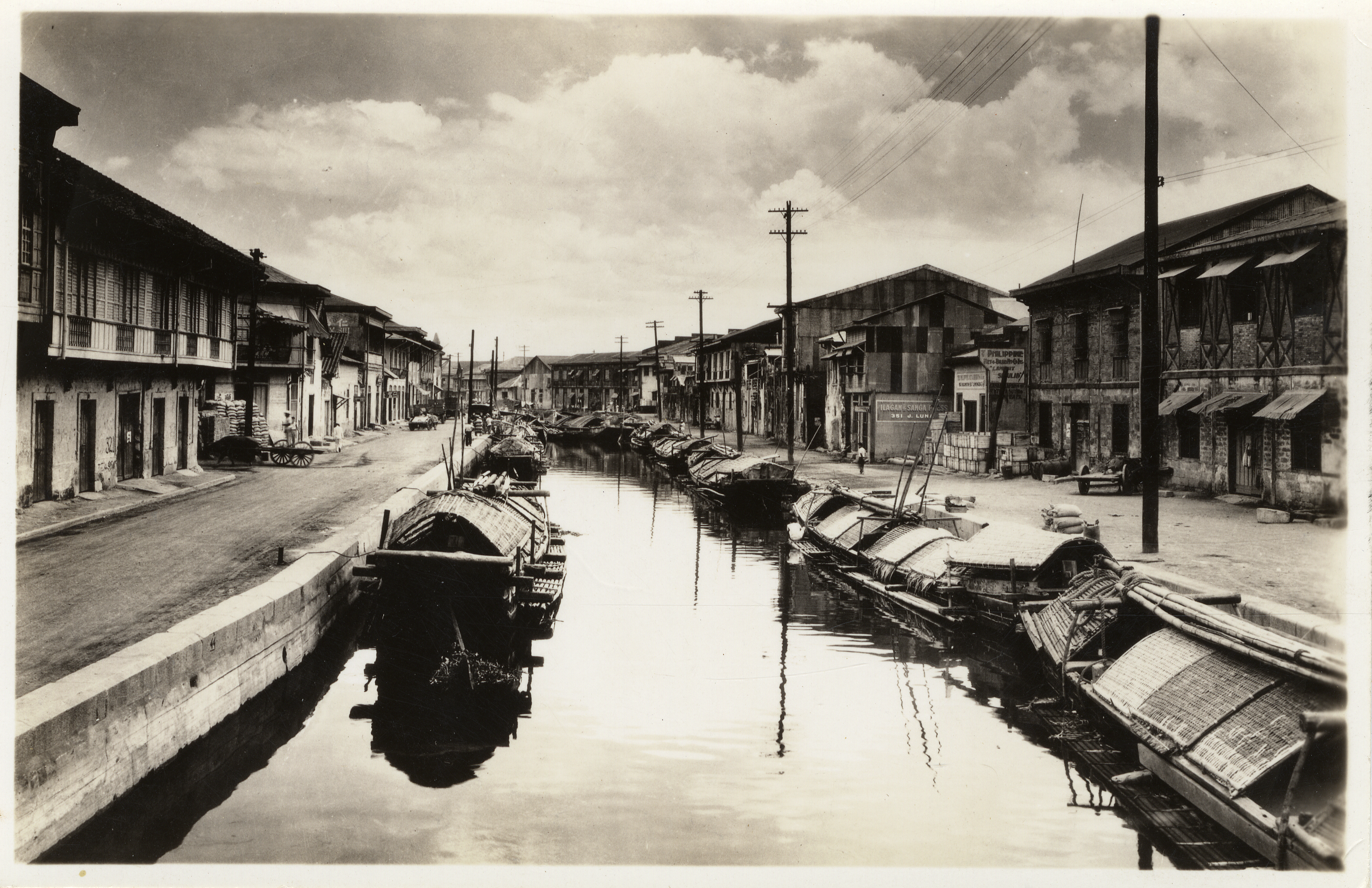
Canoes in a river in Manila, circa pre-1935

The transportation system in Metro Manila covers the road network, rail network, ferries, ports and airports located within the metropolitan Manila area. Road transportation in Metro Manila is diverse, composed of many types of private and public transport vehicles. These include taxis, buses, jeepneys, tricycles (auto rickshaws) and pedicabs. In some areas, especially in Divisoria and large public markets, two-stroke motors are fitted in the pedicabs and are used for goods transport. Regardless of modernity, horse-drawn kalesas are still used in the streets of Binondo and Intramuros. Ridesharing services such as Grab also operate within Metro Manila.

Rail transport was a historically important mode of transport in Manila and its surrounding areas, with both the Philippine National Railways (PNR) and Tranvía systems serving numerous parts capital and the region. However, these systems declined post-World War 2 due to various factors and were replaced by road-based modes of transportation. The PNR Metro Commuter Line, a commuter rail service connecting Metro Manila to the adjacent province of Laguna has been in service since 1970. A modern rapid transit system was established in 1984 with the LRT Line 1 which was followed by LRT Line 2 and MRT Line 3. Additional rail lines such as MRT Line 7 the Metro Manila Subway and the Makati Intra-city Subway are planned or under construction.

Private car ownership is significant and has grown over time. In recent years, however, the Philippine government has been pushing to improve the mass transit system through various infrastructure projects, hoping to solve the interlinked problems of transportation, land use and environment. However, similarly to most of the ASEAN member state capitals, public transportation is underprioritized in Manila.

Transport management in the region is decentralized, with the Department of Transportation (DOTr), the Department of Public Works and Highways (DPWH), and the Metropolitan Manila Development Authority (MMDA) all responsible for managing the system in the region.

== Infrastructure ==
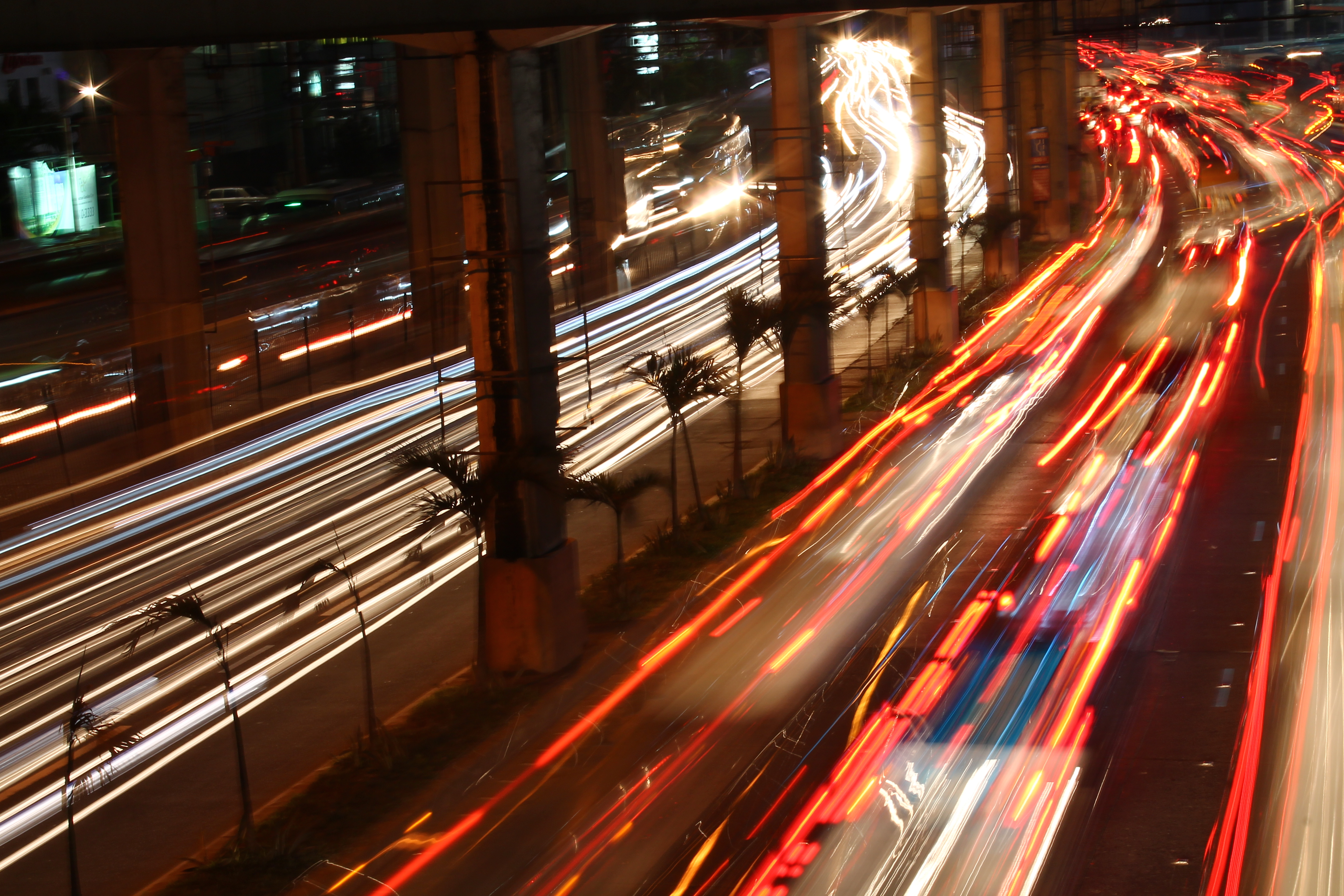
EDSA, the longest and most congested highway in the metropolis

=== Roads ===
The existing main roads of Metro Manila are organized around a set of Radial and Circumferential roads established during the American period in the country's history. All radial roads originate from various points in the city of Manila and radiate south, east or north to the other cities in Metro Manila and end farther out into the Greater Manila Area and beyond. In a similar way, all circumferential roads run in a half circle that begins and ends at Manila Bay, with Manila at the innermost circle.

The only major thoroughfare in Metro Manila not included in the arterial road system is Dr. Arcadio Santos Avenue (formerly Sucat Road) in Parañaque, designated as Highway N63

=== Expressways ===
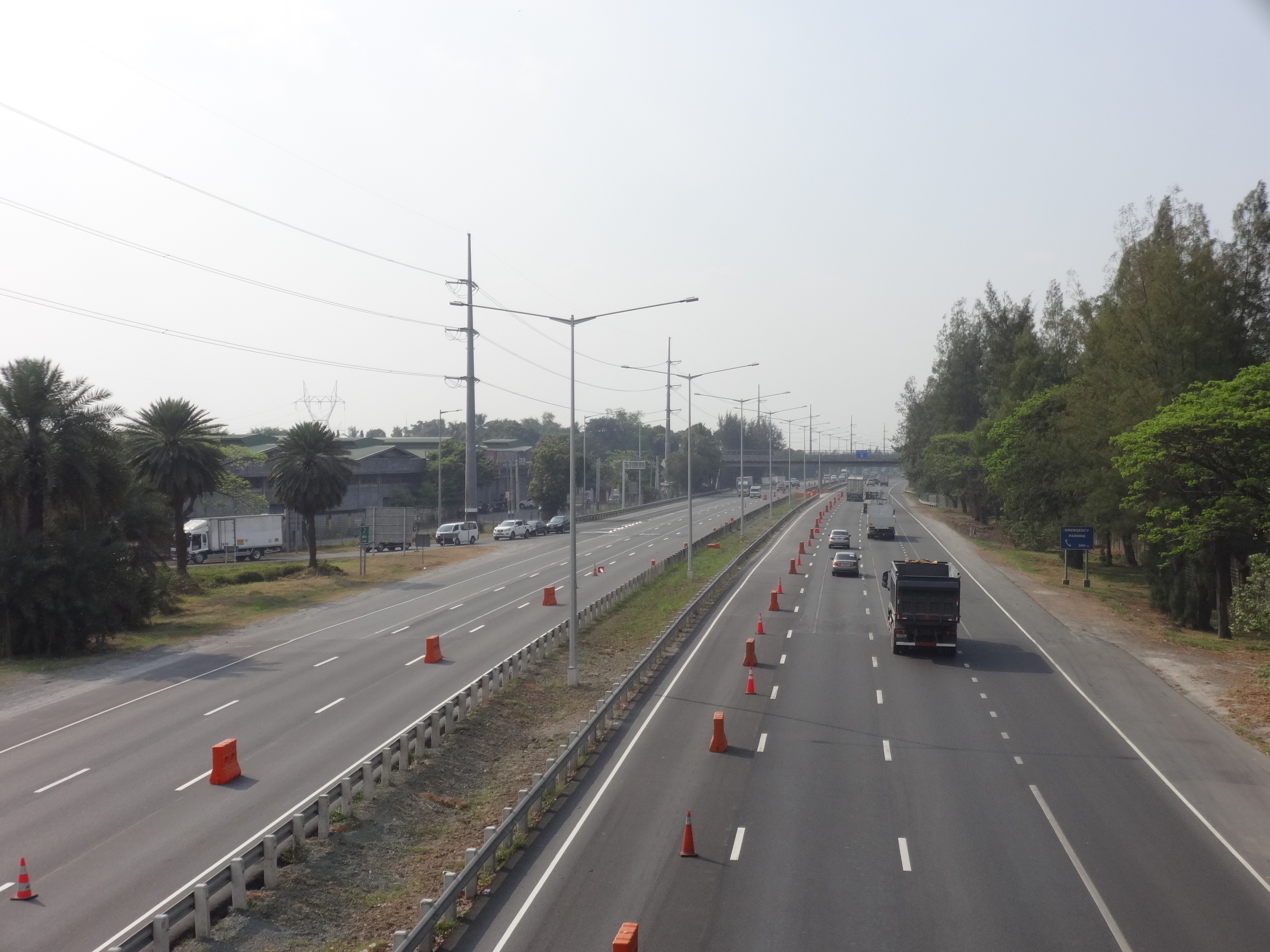
North Luzon Expressway

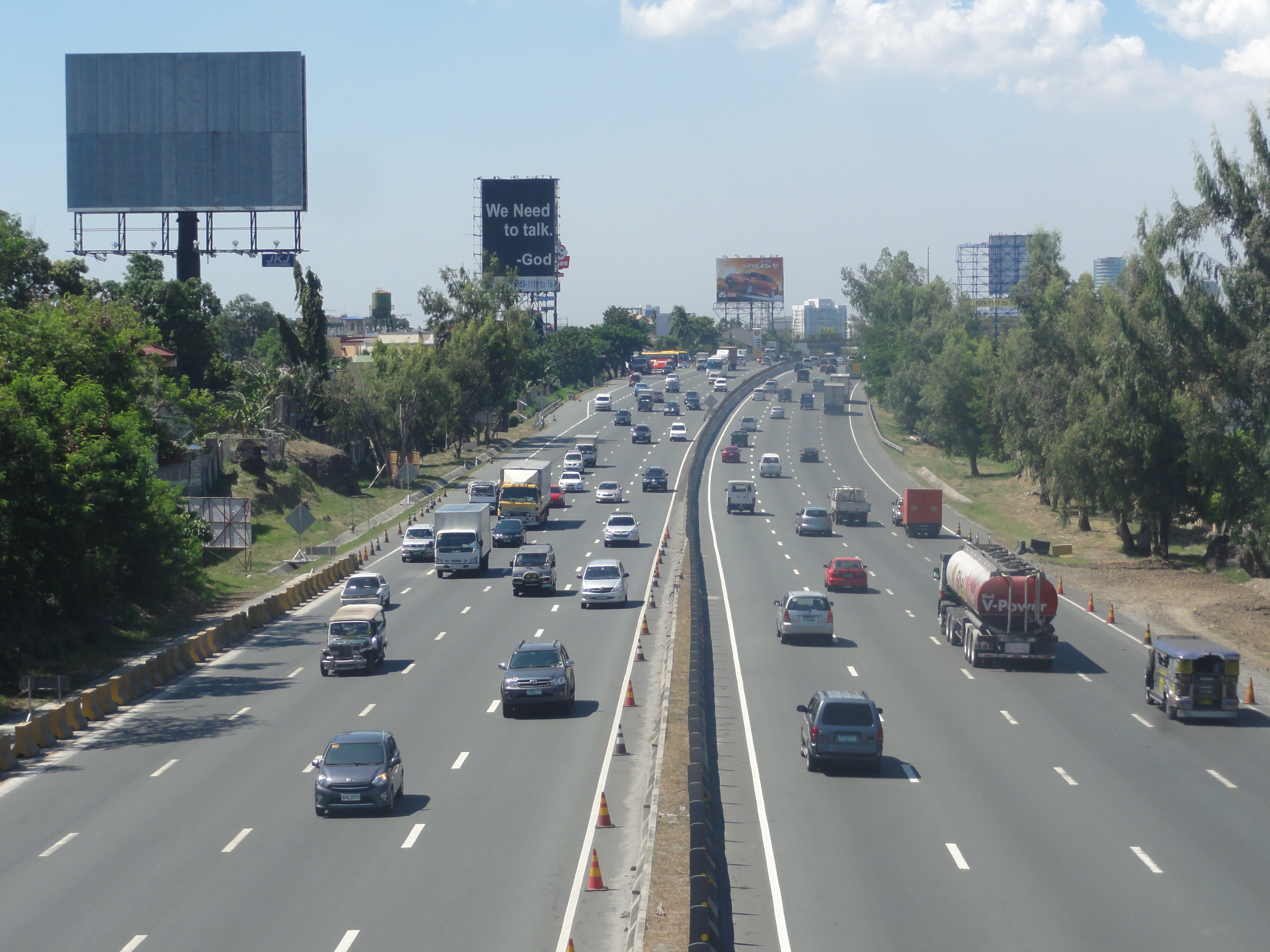
South Luzon Expressway

Expressways are controlled-access highways, with crossing traffic limited to overpasses, underpasses, and interchanges. Metro Manila is served by the North Luzon Expressway to the north and South Luzon Expressway to the south. Connecting the two is the Skyway, an elevated expressway that runs through the metropolis by going above the existing alignment of major thoroughfares in the region. Other expressways include the Muntinlupa–Cavite Expressway and the NAIA Expressway, with other expressways such as the Southeast Metro Manila Expressway, C-5 Southlink Expressway, C-5 Expressway, Pasig River Expressway, and the R-7 Expressway all in various stages of development and construction.

=== Bridges ===
There are a total of 33 bridge spans in Metro Manila that cross the Pasig and Marikina rivers, including one tollway bridge and four railway bridges.

== Public transportation ==
=== Buses ===
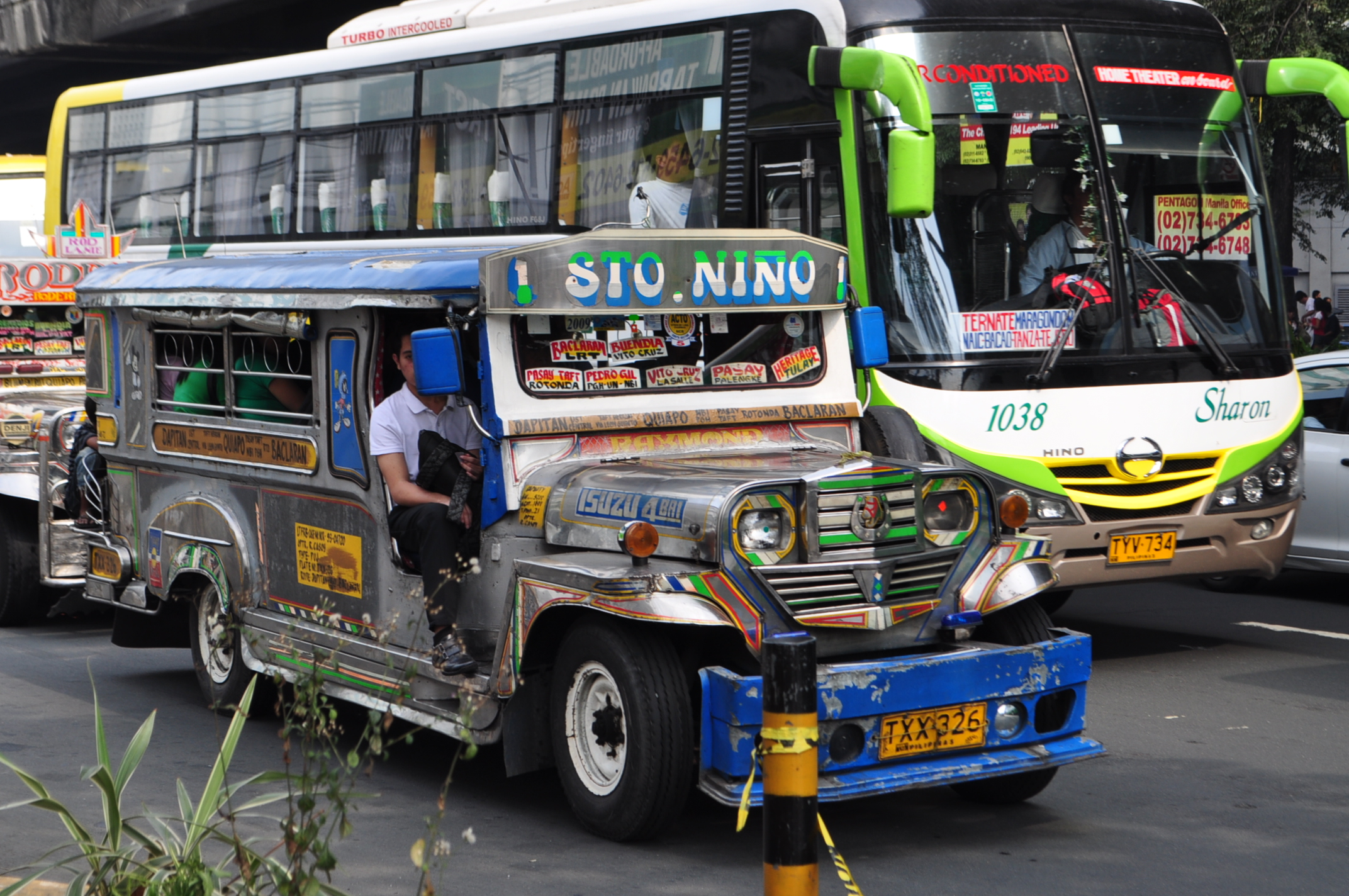
Buses and jeepneys share Manila's roads.

Bus services in Metro Manila are regulated by the Department of Transportation (DOTr) and the Metropolitan Manila Development Authority (MMDA) and operated by private bus operators.

Before the rationalization program, the region had more than 900 public transport routes operated by 830 bus franchises and more than 43,000 jeepney franchises competing with each other. This extremely deregulated public transport environment has made managing public transport services a challenge for the government for many years. The oversupply of public utility vehicles as well as redundant and overlapping transport routes have also led to severe road congestions. This meant that buses were the bane of Metro Manila's congested roads due to their numbers, their sheer physical size, and the methods of bus drivers and conductors of loading and unloading passengers.

In response, the national government instituted various reforms. By 2019, the MMDA ordered the removal of all provincial bus terminals along EDSA. In June 2020, the DOTr launched the Metro Manila Bus Rationalization Program, completely overhauling Manila's bus transport network. The program was a follow through of the 2017 Public Utility Vehicle Modernization Program and coincided with the government's gradual and calibrated resumption of Manila's public transport following more than two months under coronavirus restrictions. There are 35 rationalized bus routes currently operating in the Greater Manila Area.

In addition to the regular bus routes, there are three franchised city buses. These are BGC Bus, Citylink Coach Services, and HM Transport.

==== Bus rapid transit ====
A planned introduction to the metropolis is the bus rapid transit system (BRT), which makes use of a dedicated lane, buses with large traffic volume, suitable stations and employs an intelligent transportation system. Several BRT lines have been discussed and proposed, all are pending approval.

- BGC Bus
- C-5
- Quezon City Hall to Manila City Hall
- EDSA BRT
- Skyway BRT

The EDSA Carousel line, which starts from Monumento in Caloocan and ends at Parañaque Integrated Terminal Exchange (PITX), contains elements of a BRT system. However, the DOTr has stated that the busway is distinct from the World Bank-funded EDSA BRT.

==== Point-to-point buses (express buses) ====
Express point-to-point buses provide non-stop or limited stop travel along Metro Manila. As of 2023, there are 44 points in the Greater Manila Area served by P2P buses. Majority of the routes are served by single decker buses with just two served by double deckers.

=== Jeepneys ===
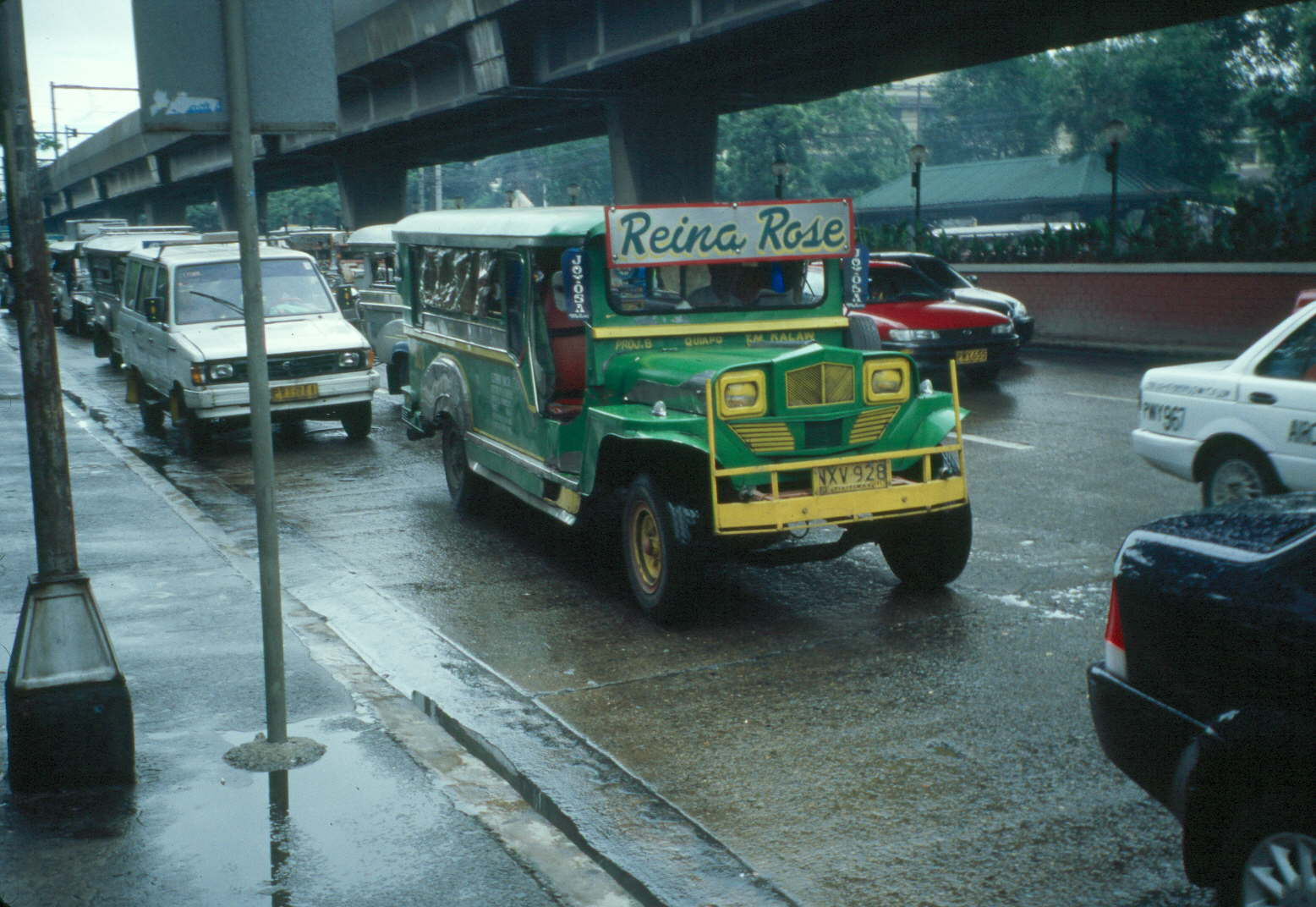
A jeepney in Manila.

Jeepneys are the most popular mode of public transportation in the Philippines and have also become a ubiquitous symbol of the Philippine culture. According to the Metro Manila Dream Plan report by the Japan International Cooperation Agency (JICA), a survey made in 2007 came out with 48,366 public utility jeepneys plying some 600 routes nationwide, with 61% serving the Greater Capital Region, which includes Metro Manila. In 2000, jeepneys and tricycles topped all modes of travel in Metro Manila at 46%, before light rail became popular, followed by buses at 24% and private vehicles at 21%. At present, there are around 270,000 franchised jeepney units on the road across the country, with some 75,000 units in Metro Manila alone.

In 2016, the DOTr imposed an age limit on jeepneys of 15 years, with older jeepneys starting to be phased out. The Public Utility Vehicle Modernization Program was formally launched in 2017, beginning the gradual phaseout of old jeepneys. As part of the PUV modernization program, all new and existing vehicles must be fitted with a tap card system which allows commuters to pay for their trip. The system would enable journey details to be recorded and the appropriate fare deducted from the stored value on the card. The majority of jeepney operators have voiced support, with a few groups voicing their opposition, leading to transport strikes in 2017–2019 and 2023–2024. Some politicians have urged the government to drop the jeepney modernization program. A 2019 study also showed that a majority of commuters prefer to ride an e-jeepney than a conventional jeepney in areas where it is available, as it provides a safer, environment-friendly, and more comfortable ride.

=== Rail transportation ===
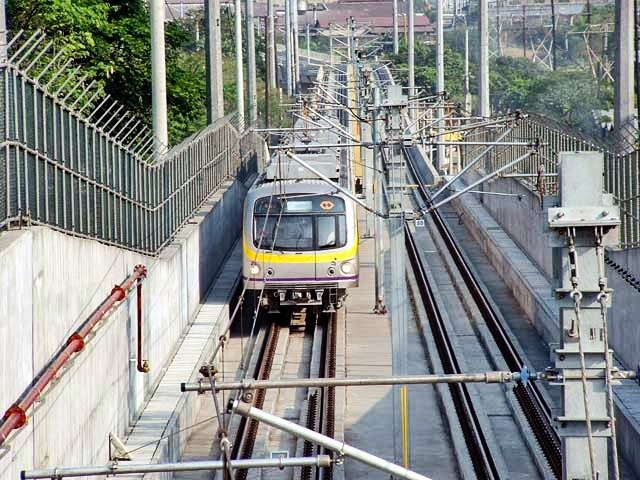
An LRTA 2000 class train approaching Katipunan station

System map of the Metro Manila railway network (current as of July 2021)

Rail transportation in the Greater Manila Area is a major part of the transportation system in Metro Manila and its surrounding areas. It consists of the Manila Light Rail Transit System, Manila Metro Rail Transit System, and the PNR Metro Commuter Line. The network makes up the majority of active railways in the country and bear the brunt of providing the metropolis with rail as a faster alternative mode of transport other than buses and jeepneys. However, these systems are currently insufficient for the rapidly expanding metropolis; to address this, new lines and line extensions are under construction, which will extend the system far out into neighboring regions.

While early rail systems have been operating in the region since 1883, the development of mass transit had its inception in the 1970 when the Philippine National Railways offered among its services the first Metro Commuter line. LRT Line 1, which is the first rail line operated by the Light Rail Transit Authority, a government corporation, opened in 1984, making it the first rapid rail transport in Southeast Asia. It was followed in 1999 by MRT Line 3 along EDSA operated by the private company, Metro Rail Transit Corporation, before LRT Line 2 was completed in 2003.

=== Major intermodal terminals ===
Name	Connections	Location	Notes
Araneta City Bus Port (ACBP)	Rail: Araneta Center–Cubao; 3 Araneta Center–Cubao; Bus routes: 3 Gateway Mall 51 53 61 ACBP; Other modes: Jeepney, taxi, UV Express	Quezon City	Opened on March 14, 2017.
Plaza Lawton	Rail: Central Terminal; Bus routes: 5 6 7 14 17 23 24 25 27 34 38 40 42 48 49 52 53 54 Lawton; Pasig River Ferry Service: Lawton Ferry Station; Other modes: Jeepney, taxi, UV Express	Manila	
North Triangle Common Station	Rail: 3 North Triangle; MMS North Avenue; EDSA Carousel: 1 North Avenue; Bus routes: 18 33 64 SM North EDSA; Other modes: Jeepney, taxi, UV Express	Quezon City	Under construction
One Ayala	Rail: 3 Ayala; EDSA Carousel: 1 Ayala; BGC Bus: EX01 NX01 WX01 L01 NR01 AX01 BA01 WE01 Ayala; Bus routes: 10 11 12 38 40 45 46 59 One Ayala 62 63 Ayala; Other modes: Jeepney, taxi, UV Express	Makati	Opened on July 18, 2022
Parañaque Integrated Terminal Exchange (PITX)	Rail: PITX; EDSA Carousel: 1 PITX; Bus routes: 4 5 6 7 14 18 22 23 26 27 28 29 30 31 32 34 43 47 52 55 65; Other modes: Jeepney, taxi, UV Express	Parañaque	Opened on November 5, 2018
Taguig Integrated Terminal Exchange (TITX)	Rail: FTI; NSCR MMS FTI; Bus routes: 41 45 62 PNR 1 FTI; Other modes: Jeepney, taxi, UV Express	Taguig	Under construction
Valenzuela Gateway Complex (VGC)	Bus routes: 13 20 37 50 51 52 Paso De Blas; Other modes: Jeepney, taxi, UV Express	Valenzuela	Opened on August 15, 2018
Vista Terminal Exchange (VTX)	Rail: Alabang; NSCR MMS Alabang; Bus routes: 10 15 23 24 36 40 44 50 58 PNR 2; Other modes: Jeepney, taxi, UV Express	Muntinlupa	
Note: Terminals and lines in italics are under construction

== Air transportation ==
=== Airports ===
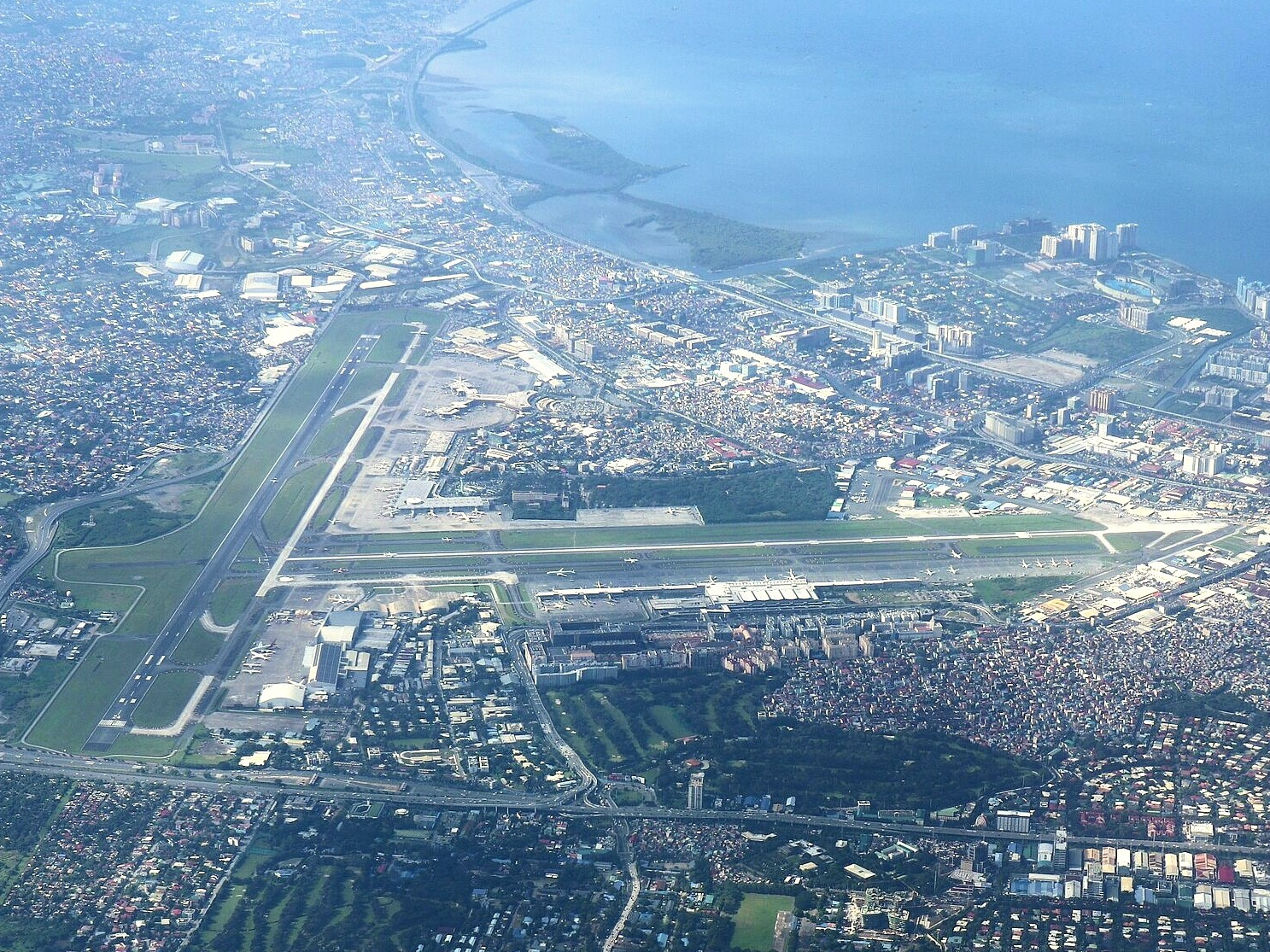
Ninoy Aquino International Airport serves as the main airport of Metro Manila.

Ninoy Aquino International Airport (IATA: MNL, ICAO: RPLL) is the main international gateway to the Philippines and Metro Manila. The airport is located between Pasay and Parañaque, about seven kilometers south of Manila city proper and southwest of Makati. It is managed by the Manila International Airport Authority (MIAA), an attached agency of the Department of Transportation (DOTr).

With a record-breaking 47-million people using the airport in 2019, NAIA has long breached the 30-million combined passenger capacity of its four terminals. While numerous proposals from the private sector to expand NAIA have been put forward, none have been implemented. There are also exploratory talks to transfer terminal assignments among airlines.

Officially, NAIA is the only airport serving the Manila area. However, in practice, both NAIA and Clark International Airport, located in the Clark Freeport Zone in Pampanga, serve the Manila area, with Clark catering mostly to low-cost carriers because of its lower landing fees compared to those charged at NAIA. In 2018, Clark handled 2.6 million passengers, all the while undergoing expansion to bring capacity to 12 million with the addition of a second terminal to be finished by 2021.

=== Proposed airports ===
In June 2014, JICA formally recommended the construction of a new airport in the vicinity of Sangley Point, Cavite City to replace the space-constricted NAIA. The recommendation involved the reclamation of Manila Bay to locate the new airport. This is contained in JICA's Metro Manila Dream Plan roadmap.

San Miguel Corporation, builders and concessionaires of the Manila Skyway and other infrastructure projects, submitted another unsolicited proposal in April 2018 to build an airport in northeast Manila Bay. In July 2019, the Swiss challenge period ended with no rival bids, and in September 2019 was given the Notice to Proceed from the Department of Transportation to build, operate and maintain New Manila International Airport. Pre-construction activities, including dredging of the rivers and canals leading to the site, began in October 2020. The first phase, consisting of two runways and the terminal buildings, is scheduled for completion by 2026.

== Water transportation ==
=== Seaports and piers ===
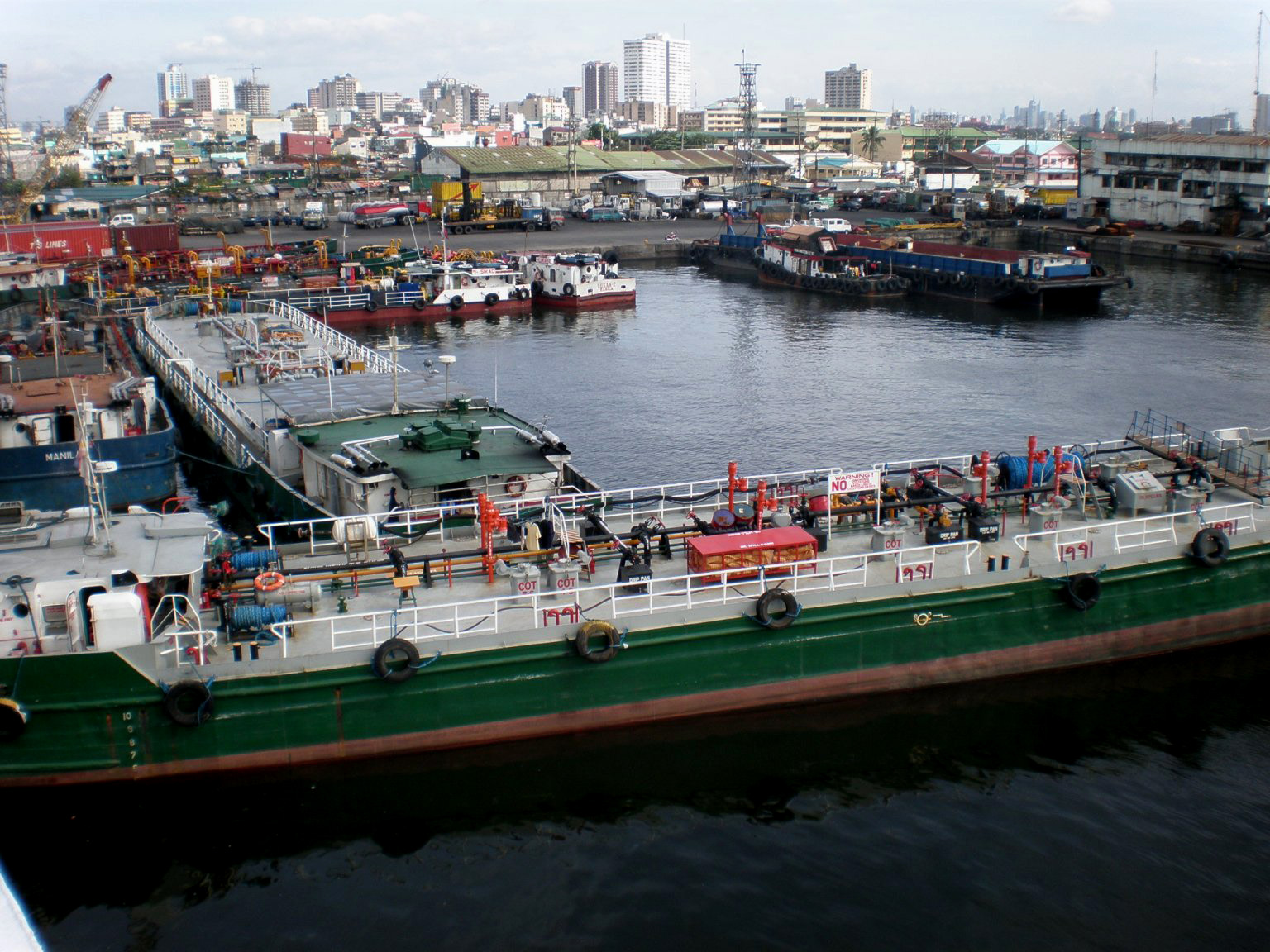
The Manila North Harbor.

The Port of Manila, located in the vicinity of Manila Bay, is the chief seaport of the Philippines. It primarily serves the city's commercial needs. North Harbor and South Harbor experience busy periods during long holidays such as Holy Week, All Saints Day and the Christmas holidays.

=== Pasig River Ferry ===
The Pasig River Ferry Service operates 17 stations along the Pasig River from Escolta Street in Manila to Pinagbuhatan in Pasig. The ferry service is the only water-based transportation that cruises the length of the Pasig River, apart from local bangka (boat) services that allow people to cross the river in specific areas.

== See also ==
- List of rail transit stations in the Greater Manila Area
- Traffic in Metro Manila
- Public Utility Vehicle Modernization Program
- Transportation in the Philippines
- Department of Public Works and Highways
- Department of Transportation
- Philippine highway network
- Philippine Nautical Highway System
