= David Harvey (paediatrician) =

British paediatrician

- David Harvey at the RCPCH
- Born: 7 December 1936; Bromley
- Died: 10 April 2010 (aged 73)
- Known for: pioneering the training of doctors in neonatal medicine
- Scientific career
- Fields: Pediatrics

David Robert Harvey FRCP (born 7 December 1936 in Bromley, died 10 April 2010) was a British paediatrician and considered by his peers to be a champion of the less privileged. Harvey was most notable for developing the training of neonatal medicine doctors at a time when the speciality had no official recognition. Harvey was homosexual and never afraid to disclose it, even at the beginning of his career, when homophobia was more prominent.

== Life ==
Harvey was the son of Cyril Francis Harvey, a diamond merchant. His early education was completed in Dulwich College and his clinical training at the University of London and Guy's Hospital Medical School qualifying in 1960.

Harvey suffered from Parkinson's disease in later life and in 1998 had to leave Hammersmith Hospital and Queen Charlotte's and Chelsea Hospitals due to the effects of the disease. Harvey was promoted to emeritus professor of paediatrics and neonatal medicine at Imperial College London. In 2004 his long time partner Teck Ong died. After becoming increasingly debilitated and immobile, he was cared for by his cousin, Anthony Stranger-Jones.

== Career ==
Harvey was then employed in several junior positions at Guy's Hospital, before becoming a registrar at Hammersmith Hospital. From 1963 to 1970 he worked at Guy's Hospital as a senior registrar specialising in paediatrics. While at Guy's Hospital, Harvey underwent training with some of the most prestigious paediatricians including Pamela Davies, Peter Tizard, Otto Wolff, John Davis and Geoffrey Dawes. In 1970, Harvey was appointed to a consultant paediatrician post at Queen Charlotte's Maternity Hospital and St Charles’ Hospital a year later, a position he held until 2002.

== Contributions ==
Harvey was appointed to the founding advisory committee of the premature baby medical care charity, Bliss in 1979. He was principally notable for advocating research that was then considered unimportant, compared to the core research used to treat brain and life support functions.

One of these treatments which made him well known was the storage and provisioning of donor breast milk for use by premature babies, an issue that is still relevant and unsolved today. The discovery and effects of HIV led to the inevitable closure of many breast milk banks around the UK and it was only thanks to the support of Harvey that the human milk storage bank at Queen Charlotte's and Chelsea hospital survived.

== Royal confinements ==
Harvey was the court appointed consultant paediatrician for the birth of Princess Anne's children, Peter Phillips in 1977 and Zara Phillips in 1981. Harvey was further appointed as consultant paediatrician for the births of Diana, Princess of Wales's children, Prince William, Duke of Cambridge in 1982 and Prince Harry, Duke of Sussex in 1984.

== Memberships and associations ==
Harvey was active in establishing the Gay and Lesbian Association of Doctors and Dentists (GLADD), becoming a founder member, later became treasurer and co-chair. Harvey also had a position as director of the charity, the Terence Higgins Trust.

== Bibliography ==
- Neonatal Clinical Pharmacology and Therapeutics., G Rylance; David R Harvey; Jacob V Aranda. Kent:Elsevier Science, 2014.
- Neonatology., Roslyn Thomas; David Harvey. Edinburgh; New York : Churchill Livingstone, 1998.
- The baby book., David Harvey. London; New York : M. Cavendish, 1975.
- Paediatrics., Roslyn Thomas; David Harvey. Edinburgh; New York : Churchill Livingstone, 1997.
- Biology of play., Barbara Tizard, David Robert Harvey. London : William Heinemann, 1977
- The sick newborn baby., Christopher J H Kelnar; David Harvey; C Simpson. Edinburgh : W.B.Saunders, 1995.

== Awards and honours ==
Harvey was awarded the James Spence Medal in 1999 by the Royal College of Paediatrics and Child Healthfh for outstanding contributions to the advancement of paediatric knowledge.
