= German Association for Medical Education =

- Gesellschaft für Medizinische Ausbildung
- Abbreviation: GMA
- Formation: April 22, 1978; 48 years ago
- Founded at: Germany
- Headquarters: Erlangen
- Members: 950 (2012)
- Official language: German
- President: Martin R. Fischer
- Website: gesellschaft-medizinische-ausbildung.org

The German Association for Medical Education (German: Gesellschaft für Medizinische Ausbildung) is a non-profit organization to promote interdisciplinary advancement of medical education in German speaking countries. GMA is a member of the Association of the Scientific Medical Societies in Germany and the Association for Medical Education in Europe (AMEE). It was founded on April 22, 1978.

== Cooperations ==
Among other organizations, the GMA cooperates with:

- Medizinischer Fakultätentag (MFT)
- Association of the Scientific Medical Societies in Germany (AWMF)
- Bundesvertretung der Medizinstudierenden in Deutschland (bvmd)
- Association for Medical Education in Europe (AMEE)

== Presidents ==
- Fritz Kemper (1978 – 1982)
- Jörg-Dietrich Hoppe (1982 – 1986)
- Dietrich Habeck (1986 – 1994)
- Florian Eitel (1994 – 2003)
- Eckard G. Hahn (2003 – 2011)
- Martin R. Fischer (2011 – present)

== Annual conferences ==
1. 2004: Berlin, Germany
2. 2005: Münster, Germany
3. 2006: Cologne, Germany
4. 2007: Hanover, Germany
5. 2008: Greifswald, Germany
6. 2009: Freiburg, Germany
7. 2010: Bochum, Germany
8. 2011: Munich, Germany
9. 2012: Aachen, Germany
10. 2013: Graz, Austria
11. 2014: Hamburg, Germany
12. 2015: Leipzig, Germany
13. 2016: Bern, Switzerland
14. 2017: Münster, Germany
15. 2018: Vienna, Austria
16. 2019: Frankfurt, Germany
17. 2020: Zürich, Switzerland (cancelled)
18. 2021: online
19. 2022: Halle (Saale), Germany
20. 2023: Osnabrück, Germany
