= Gay Doctors Ireland =

Irish LGBT organization

Gay Doctors Ireland (GDI) is an organisation of gay, lesbian, bisexual and transgender (LGBTQ) physicians and medical students in Ireland. It was founded in Dublin by Conor Malone in 2010 as Ireland's first association for LGBT doctors.

== Activity ==
GDI was created to provide an educational, professional and social support network for LGBT doctors and medical students. In 2010, the group's inaugural annual general meeting featured Doctor Jesse Ehrenfeld of Harvard University.

Among the issues addressed by the group is the Irish Blood Transfusion Service controversial ban on gay men donating blood. GDI argued the policies stigmatise gay men, and are a form of government-sponsored homophobia In September 2011, GDI criticised Deputy Brian Walsh's efforts to deny surgery to transgender patients.

In April 2011, GDI announced an annual LGBT Health Research Bursary for medical students, the first of its kind in Ireland. Its purpose is to sponsor undergraduate medical students in Ireland to undertake a summer research project focussed on LGBT health.

== See also ==
- List of LGBT medical organizations
- Gay and Lesbian Medical Association
