= Greater Manila Area =

Contiguous urbanized region surrounding Metro Manila

Greater Manila Area Malawakang Maynila
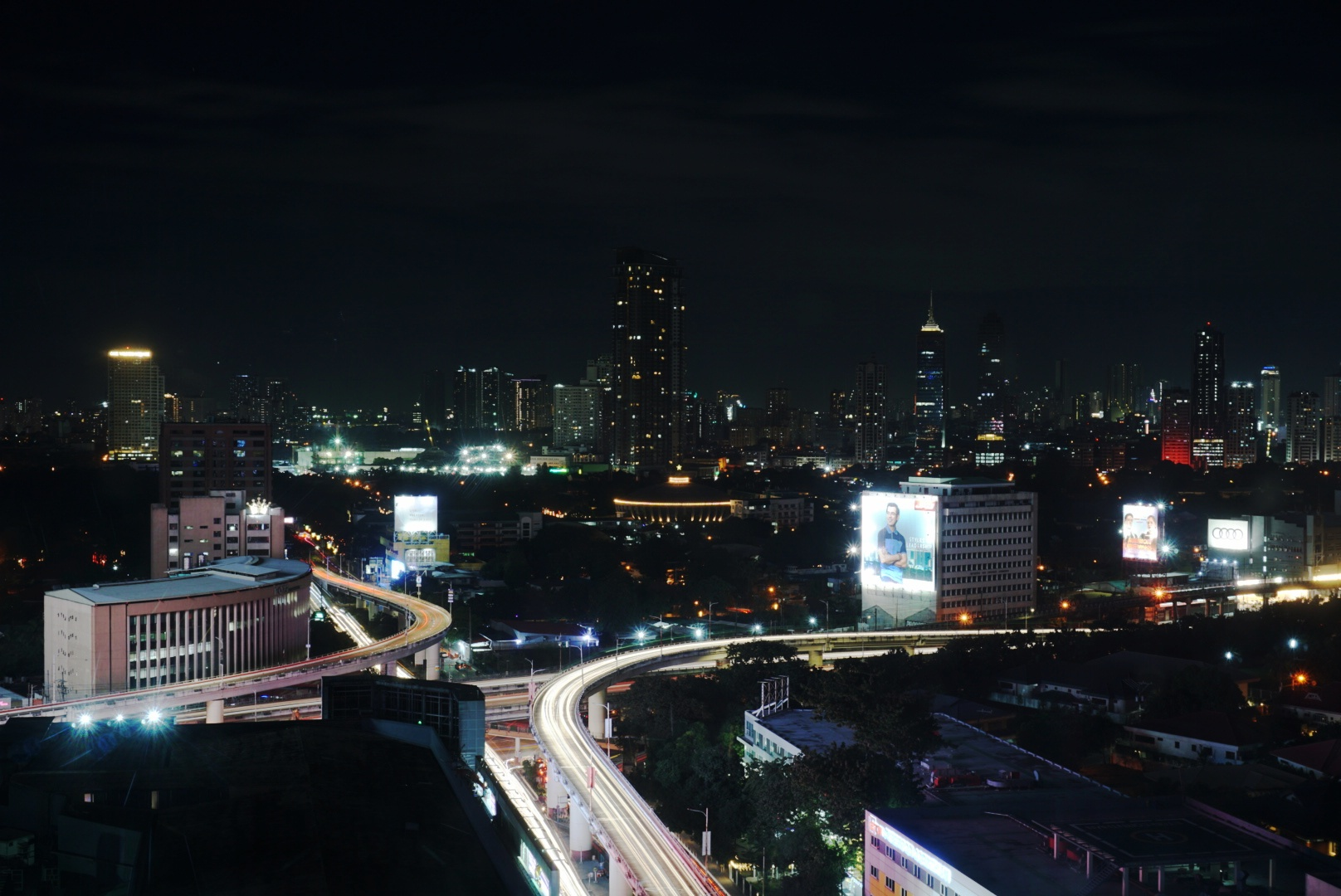
- The Metro Manila skyline seen from Ortigas Center

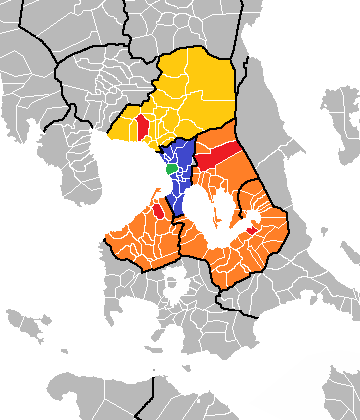
- Location of the Greater Manila Area within Luzon: Metro Manila; Manila; Central Luzon (Bulacan); Calabarzon (Cavite, Laguna, Rizal); Provincial capitals (Antipolo, Imus, Malolos, Santa Cruz)
- Country: Philippines
- Provinces: Metro Manila; Bulacan; Cavite; Laguna; Rizal

Area
  - Metro: 7,967.95 km^{2} (3,076.44 sq mi)

Population
  - Urban: 24,922,000
  - Metro: 30,785,176
  - Metro density: 3,863.63/km^{2} (10,006.7/sq mi)

The Greater Manila Area (Filipino: Malawakang Maynila) is the contiguous urbanized region surrounding the Metropolitan Manila in the Philippines. This built-up zone includes Metro Manila and the neighboring provinces of Bulacan to the north, Cavite and Laguna to the south, and Rizal to the east. While urban sprawl continues to absorb new zones, some areas remain as independent settlement clusters separated by non-urban land.

In early 2021, during the COVID-19 pandemic, the area was also referred to as "NCR Plus" or "NCR+" (National Capital Region Plus) by authorities, in connection with the designation of community quarantines.

== Definition and scope ==
The Greater Manila Area refers to the continuous urbanized region extending beyond the official boundaries of Metro Manila, encompassing adjacent portions of Bulacan to the north, Cavite and Laguna to the south, and Rizal to the east.

The broader term "Mega Manila" is often used by agencies such as the Department of Economy, Planning, and Development (DEPDev) to include Central Luzon and Calabarzon, but "Greater Manila Area" specifically refers to the contiguous built-up zone around Metro Manila.

== Demographics ==
As of the 2020 Census, the combined population of Metro Manila, Bulacan, Cavite, Laguna, and Rizal was approximately 26.7 million. By mid-2025, the urban population of the Philippines reached 57.6 million, representing about 49.3% of the total population of 116.8 million.

The Manila urban agglomeration alone is projected to reach 14.8 million in 2025.

=== Statistics ===
Province or region	Population (2015)	Population (2020)	Population (2024)	Area	Density (2020)	Region	Mun	Cities	Brgy
Metro Manila	12,877,253	13,484,462	14,001,751	619.57 km^{2} (239.22 sq mi)	21,764/km^{2} (56,369/sq mi)	NCR	1	16	1,706
Bulacan	3,292,071	3,708,890	3,876,806	2,796.10 km^{2} (1,079.58 sq mi)	1,326/km^{2} (3,435/sq mi)	III	20	4	572
Cavite	3,678,301	4,344,829	4,573,884	1,574.17 km^{2} (607.79 sq mi)	2,760/km^{2} (7,149/sq mi)	IV-A	16	7	829
Laguna	3,035,081	3,382,193	3,687,345	1,917.85 km^{2} (740.49 sq mi)	1,764/km^{2} (4,568/sq mi)	IV-A	24	6	681
Rizal	2,884,227	3,330,143	3,416,541	1,191.94 km^{2} (460.21 sq mi)	2,794/km^{2} (7,236/sq mi)	IV-A	13	1	188
Total	25,766,933	28,250,517	29,556,327	8,099.63 km^{2} (3,127.28 sq mi)	3,488/km^{2} (9,034/sq mi)	GMA	74	34	3,973

The Greater Manila Area is composed of 34 cities (16 highly urbanized cities and 18 component cities) and 74 municipalities.

== Economy ==
Metro Manila contributes about 31% of the Philippines' GDP, while Calabarzon accounts for 14.1% and Central Luzon for 10.9%, underscoring the Greater Manila Area's central role in the national economy.

In 2024, NEDA (now DEPDev) estimated that the broader "Mega Manila" corridor, consisting of these three regions, generated over half (56%) of the country's GDP, amounting to approximately US$260 billion.

== Urbanization and land use ==
Urban sprawl from Metro Manila has accelerated since the late 20th century, driven by expressway construction and real estate development. Built-up areas now extend across southern Bulacan, western Laguna, northern Cavite, and western Rizal, with large residential subdivisions, malls, and mixed-use complexes replacing agricultural land.

== Transportation ==
=== Air ===
The majority of passenger traffic goes through Metro Manila's Ninoy Aquino International Airport (NAIA), which is the Philippines' busiest airport and major hub. Clark International Airport, which has been developed into an alternate international gateway, also sees a significant amount of traffic. Subic Bay International Airport (SBIA), although classified as an international airport by the Civil Aviation Authority of the Philippines (CAAP), currently only hosts domestic flights.

=== Road ===
The Greater Manila Area is linked by several expressways, including the North Luzon Expressway, South Luzon Expressway, Skyway, Manila–Cavite Expressway (CAVITEX), and Cavite–Laguna Expressway (CALAX).

=== Rail ===
The rail transportation in the Greater Manila Area is a major part of the transportation system in Metro Manila and its surrounding areas. The railway network, collectively known as the Greater Capital Region Railway System, consists of the Manila Light Rail Transit System (LRT), Manila Metro Rail Transit System (MRT), and Philippine National Railways lines within the region.

The network makes up the majority of active railways in the country and bear the brunt of providing the metropolis with rail as a faster alternative mode of transport other than buses and jeepneys. However, these systems are currently insufficient for the rapidly expanding metropolis; to address this, new lines and line extensions are under construction, which will extend the system far out into neighboring regions.

== Governance and planning ==
Unlike Metro Manila, which is managed by the Metropolitan Manila Development Authority (MMDA), the Greater Manila Area lacks a central governing body. Coordination is carried out through the Department of Economy, Planning, and Development (DEPDev) along with provincial governments.

The Luzon Urban Beltway has been a recurring feature in national development strategies, conceived to promote industrial clustering and global competitiveness.

== Environmental and social issues ==
Traffic congestion in Metro Manila remains among the worst globally. In 2024, the TomTom Traffic Index ranked Metro Manila as the most congested city in the world. Economic losses due to congestion were already estimated at ₱3 billion per day in 2012, with projections that this could double by 2030.

Air quality remains a major concern, with vehicle emissions accounting for over 80% of air pollution in Metro Manila. A 2023 policy paper estimated thousands of premature deaths annually in the capital region due to particulate matter exposure.

== Culture and identity ==
The Greater Manila Area is the cultural, educational, and media hub of the Philippines, hosting leading universities, hospitals, and broadcast networks. Its influence extends well into Cavite, Laguna, Bulacan, and Rizal. While Tagalog is the dominant language, localized dialects coexist with the Manila standard. The area continues to serve as the center of Philippine television, film, and print industries.
