= LGBTI Health Summit =

The LGBTI Health Summits are an opportunity for individuals working for the health of intersex, trans, bisexual, lesbian and gay people to meet and share ideas. Attendees are mostly health activists, a mix of medical care professionals, alternative and complementary health providers, outreach workers, volunteers, and other interested parties.

The LGBTI Health Summits grew out of a resurgence in queer health movements which looked beyond a victim deficit based model of disease, using an asset based approach.

The LGBTI Health Summits grew out of the first Gay Men's Health Summit, held in Boulder, Colorado, in 1999.

The first National LGBTI Health Summit was held in Boulder, Colorado, in 2002. The second was held in Cambridge, Massachusetts, in 2004. The third was held in Philadelphia, Pennsylvania, in 2007. The fourth was held in Chicago, Illinois, August 14–18, 2009. The fifth summit took place in Bloomington, Indiana, July 16–19, 2011.

Gay Men's Health Summits have been held in Boulder, Colorado, in 1999 and 2000, and Gay, Bisexual and Trans Men's Summits in Raleigh, North Carolina, in 2003, and Salt Lake City, Utah, in 2006; a Gay Men's Health Summit was held in Seattle, Washington, in October 2008, and another was held in Fort Lauderdale, Florida, in August 2010.

== See also ==
- Healthcare and the LGBT community
- LGBT rights by country or territory
