= GLMA: Health Professionals Advancing LGBTQ+ Equality =

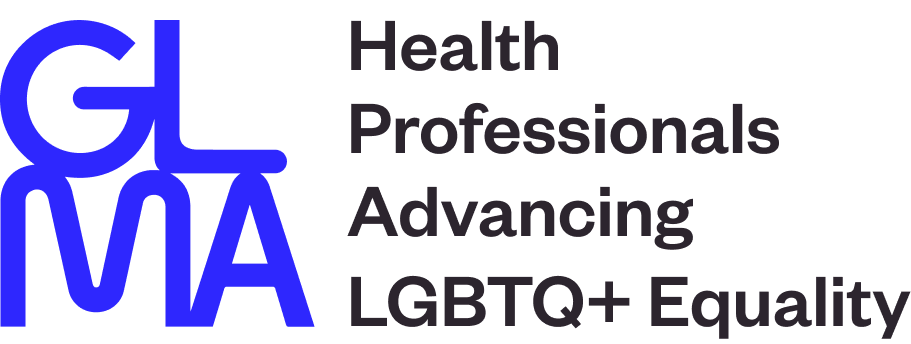
- Abbreviation: GLMA
- Formation: 1981; 45 years ago
- Type: Voluntary association
- Fields: Health care
- President: Jona Tanguay (2025)
- Executive Director: Alex Sheldon (2025)
- Website: https://glma.org/
- Formerly called: American Association of Physicians for Human Rights; Gay & Lesbian Medical Association

GLMA: Health Professionals Advancing LGBTQ+ Equality is a voluntary association in the United States which represents healthcare professionals who identify as LGBTQ+. The association today provides support support for education and research in the field of healthcare regarding LGBTQ+ issues, as well as engaging in advocacy around LGBTQ+ issues as they related to healthcare and in support of LGBTQ+ healthcare professionals. Founded in 1981 as the American Association of Physicians for Human Rights, the organisation today is the world's largest and oldest association of LGBTQ+ healthcare professionals and represents LGBTQ+ people from all healthcare professions, not just medical doctors.

== History ==
GLMA was originally founded in 1981 as the American Association of Physicians for Human Rights to promote equality for LGBTQ+ patients and healthcare professionals. The original organisation was associated with the Bay Area Physicians for Human Rights (BAPHR) out of San Francisco, California. In the early years of the association, much of the focus was on responding to the emergence of HIV/AIDS in the United States amongst the queer community and the ensuing rise of homophobia directed towards LGBTQ+ patients, as well as supporting LGBTQ+ medical professionals to come out in the workplace. In 1986, the AAPHR collaborated with the UK's Gay Medical Association (today GLADD: The Association of LGBTQ+ Doctors and Dentists) in order to host the first international conference on Homosexuality and Medicine at the Royal Society of Medicine in London.

The association was later renamed to the Gay & Lesbian Medical Association. As the name suggested, the organisation was initially targeted at medical practitioners, with membership only being open to doctors and medical students; this state of affairs continued until 2002, when membership became open to all healthcare professionals and supporters of LGBTQ+ health. Today, the association is home to members from multiple professional groups, including nurses, physician assistants, clinical researchers, and allied health professionals, as well as those who are not healthcare professionals but who wish to support the group's aims. In 2012, the organisation officially changed their name to GLMA: Health Professionals Advancing LGBT Equality in order to better represent its diverse membership, with the addition of "Q+" to the end of the name following on in 2018 to better represent the wider community.

== Research activities ==
In the summer of 2006, GLMA undertook a project funded by a $320,000 grant from healthcare services management company Hythiam to investigate the causes and extent of methamphetamine use among gay men and other men who have sex with men, options for treating methamphetamine dependence, and how best to get methamphetamine-dependent gay men into appropriate treatment, as well as to explore other issues and controversies associated with these issues.

The Lesbian Health Fund (LHF), a GLMA program, is dedicated to enhancing the health and well-being of LGBTQ+ women and girls by funding robust scientific research. Since its establishment in 1992, LHF has supported 134 research projects, distributing over $1.2 million in grants.

Up until at least 2002, the association produced the Journal of the Gay and Lesbian Medical Association, a peer reviewed medical journal dedicated to the healthcare needs of LGBTQ+ people.

== See also ==
- LGBTQ health
- LGBTQ rights in the United States
- Transgender rights in the United States
- Journal of the Gay and Lesbian Medical Association

=== Similar organisations ===
- List of LGBTQ medical organizations
- Association of LGBTQ Psychiatrists
- Gay Doctors Ireland
- GLADD
