= SMX Convention Center (company) =

Philippine event hall management company

- Type: Subsidiary
- Industry: Events
- Founded: 1992; 34 years ago in the Philippines
- Headquarters: Pasay, Philippines
- Area served: Philippines
- Services: Event halls and convention center management
- Parent: SM Prime Holdings
- Website: www.smxconventioncenter.com

The SMX Convention Center is an events venue management company which manages convention and exhibition venues. It is a subsidiary of SM Prime Holdings and the flagship convention center brand under SM Hotels & Conventions Corporation.

Its primary venue is the SMX Convention Center Manila, which is located within the SM Mall of Asia complex in Pasay, Metro Manila.

== History ==
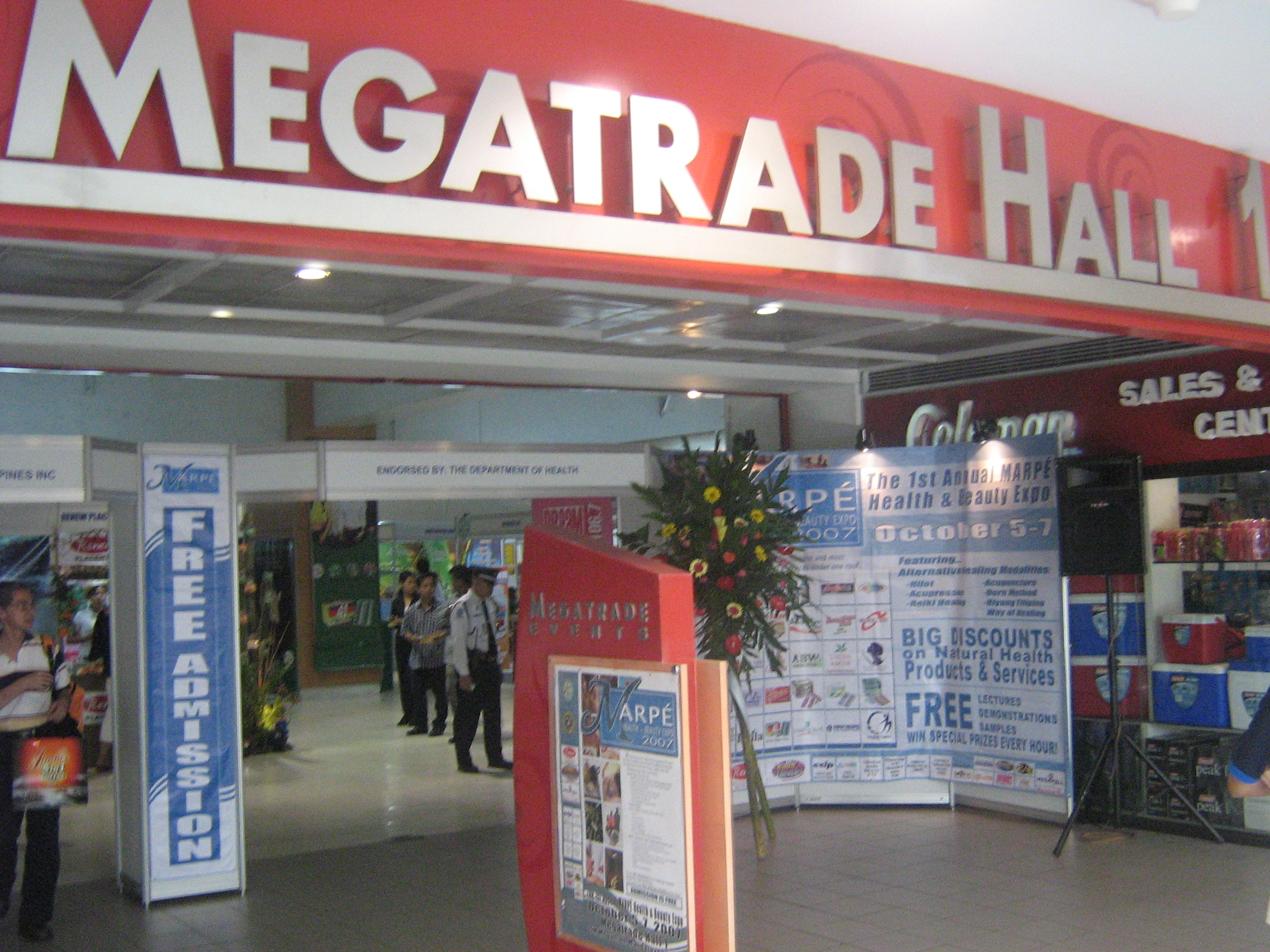
Megatrade Hall in SM Megamall in 2007

The SM brand initially entered the Meetings, Incentives, Conventions, and Exhibitions (MICE) industry with the opening of Cebu Trade Hall at SM City Cebu in Cebu City in 1993, followed by Megatrade Hall at SM Megamall in Mandaluyong in 1994. The success of these venues later led to the current SMX Convention Center brand, starting with its flagship location, now SMX Convention Center Manila, at the SM Mall of Asia complex in Pasay, which opened on November 5, 2007. SMX began expanding with the opening of SMX Convention Center Davao at SM Lanang Premier, Davao City, on December 17, 2012.

== Venues ==
=== SMX Convention Center Manila ===
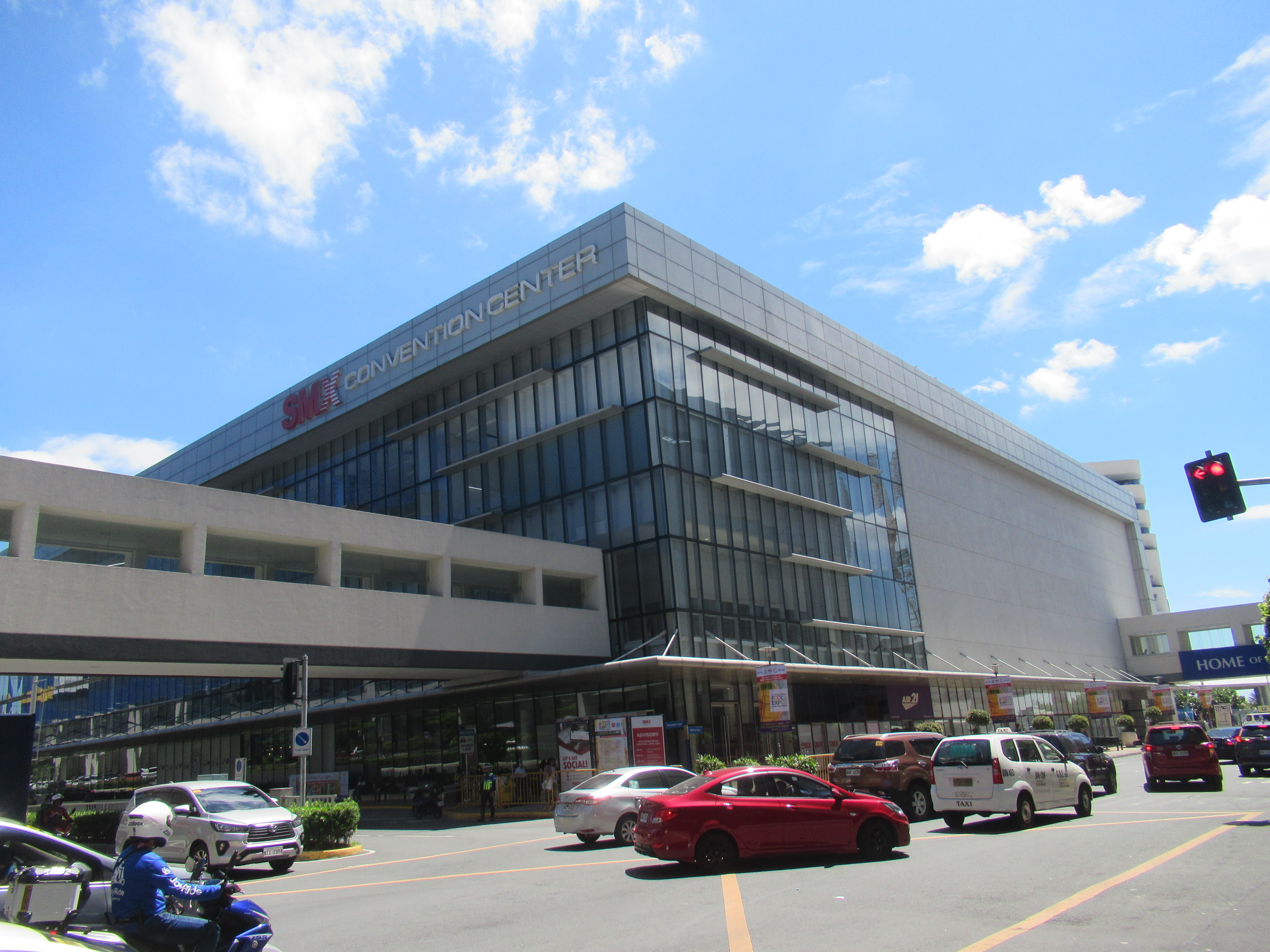
SMX Convention Center Manila

The SMX Convention Center Manila is an exhibition venue and is the first and main venue under the SMX Convention Center brand. It is hosted in a dedicated building within the SM Mall of Asia complex in Pasay.

=== Other exhibition halls ===
SMX Convention Center Bacolod

Other events venue under the SMX Convention Center brand are hosted mostly inside SM Supermalls, such as:

- SMX Convention Center Aura (SM Aura)
- SMX Convention Center Bacolod (SM City Bacolod)
- SMX Convention Center Davao (SM Lanang)
- SMX Convention Center Olongapo (SM City Olongapo Central)
- SMX Convention Center Clark (SM City Clark), but, unlike the above branches, is detached from the main mall.

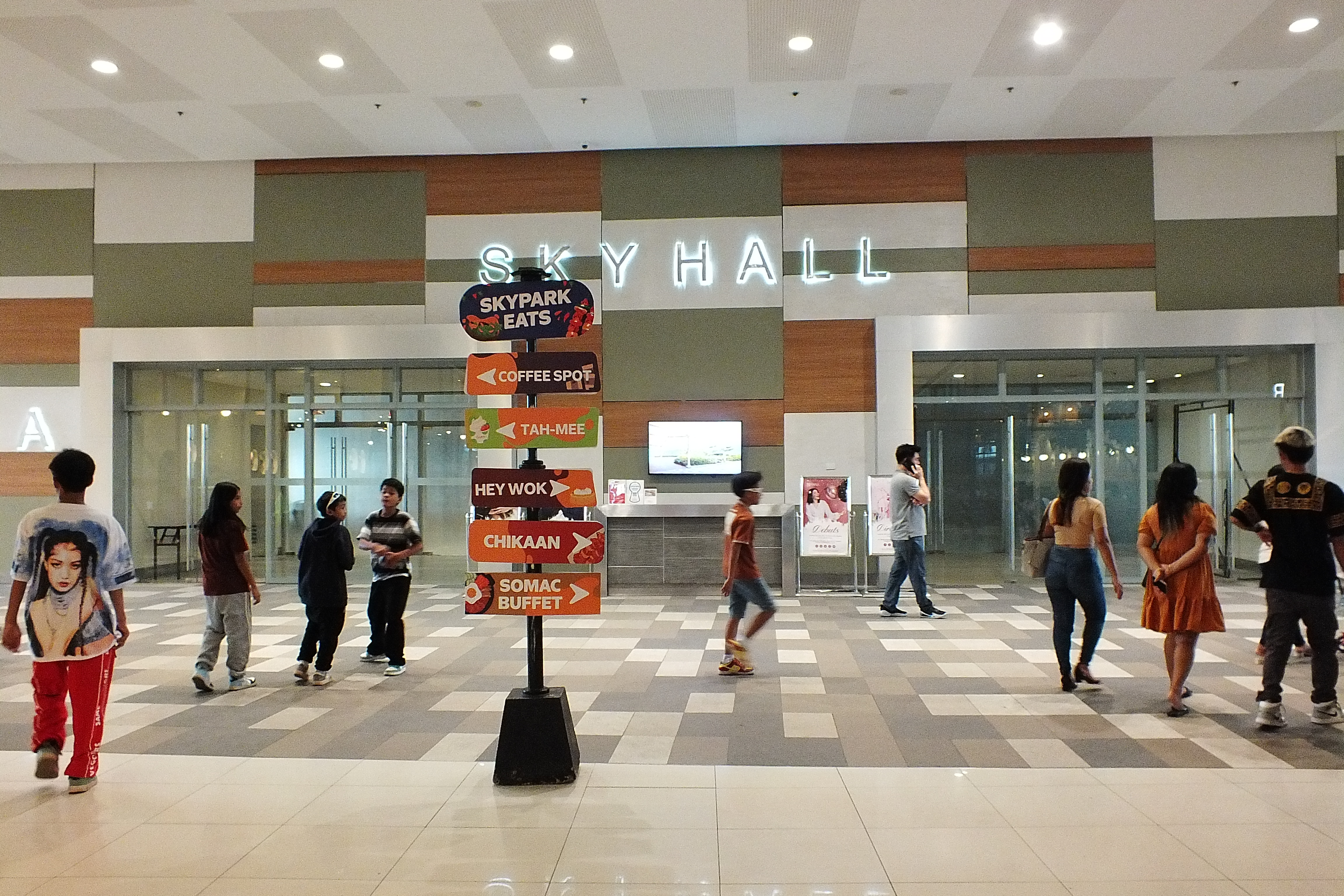
Sky Hall Seaside Cebu

SMX also manages the following event or trade halls:

- Megatrade Hall (SM Megamall)
- Cebu Trade Hall (SM City Cebu; now defunct)
- Sky Hall Seaside Cebu (SM Seaside City Cebu)
- Trade Hall (SM City General Santos)
- CDO Downtown Event Hall (SM CDO Downtown)

=== Future Venues ===
There are plans to open new SMX venues such as:

- SMX Convention Center Seaside Cebu (SM Seaside City Cebu)
- SMX Convention Center Santa Rosa (SM Nuvali), which is detached from the main mall and situated inside the Park Inn hotel
- SMX Convention Center Sto. Tomas (SM City Sto. Tomas)
- SMX Center for International Trade and Exhibitions (SMXCITE; near SM Mall of Asia)
- SMX Trade Hall Cabanatuan (SM City Cabanatuan)
