= Abreeza =

Shopping mall in the Philippines

Ayala Malls Abreeza

- Abreeza in April 2023.
- Location: Abreeza Ayala Business Park, J.P. Laurel Ave., Bajada, Davao City, Philippines
- Coordinates: 7°5′29.2″N 125°36′39.39″E
- Opened: May 12, 2011; 15 years ago
- Developer: Ayala Land; Anflocor
- Manager: Ayala Malls
- Owner: Accendo Commercial Corporation (a joint venture company of Ayala Land and Anflocor)
- Num. of stores: ~300
- Floors: 4-Main Building; 8-Corporate Center; 10-Corporate Center 2 (proposed); 12-Seda Hotel; 24-Avida Abreeza tower 4; 26-Abreeza Residences; 26-Avida Abreeza tower 1; 26-Avida Abreeza tower 2; 26-Avida Abreeza tower 3; 27-Abreeza Place tower 1; 27-Abreeza Place tower 2; 28 Patio Suites Abreeza 1; 28 Patio Suites Abreeza 2
- Parking: 1200 cars
- Public transit: Buhangin via JP Laurel Catitipan via JP Laurel Landmark 3 Cabantian Country Homes Emily Homes Juliville Tigatto Communal Mandug; Sasa via JP Laurel Doña Pilar-Roxas Ave.; Panacan via JP Laurel Panacan-SM City Panacan-Ilustre; Tibungco-Roxas Ave. Bunawan-Roxas Ave. Lasang-Roxas Ave.; Route 4 Route 10; R603 Buhangin R763 Panacan (via Buhangin); Future: M3 Abreeza
- Website: www.ayalamalls.com.ph/malls-philippines/abreeza-davao

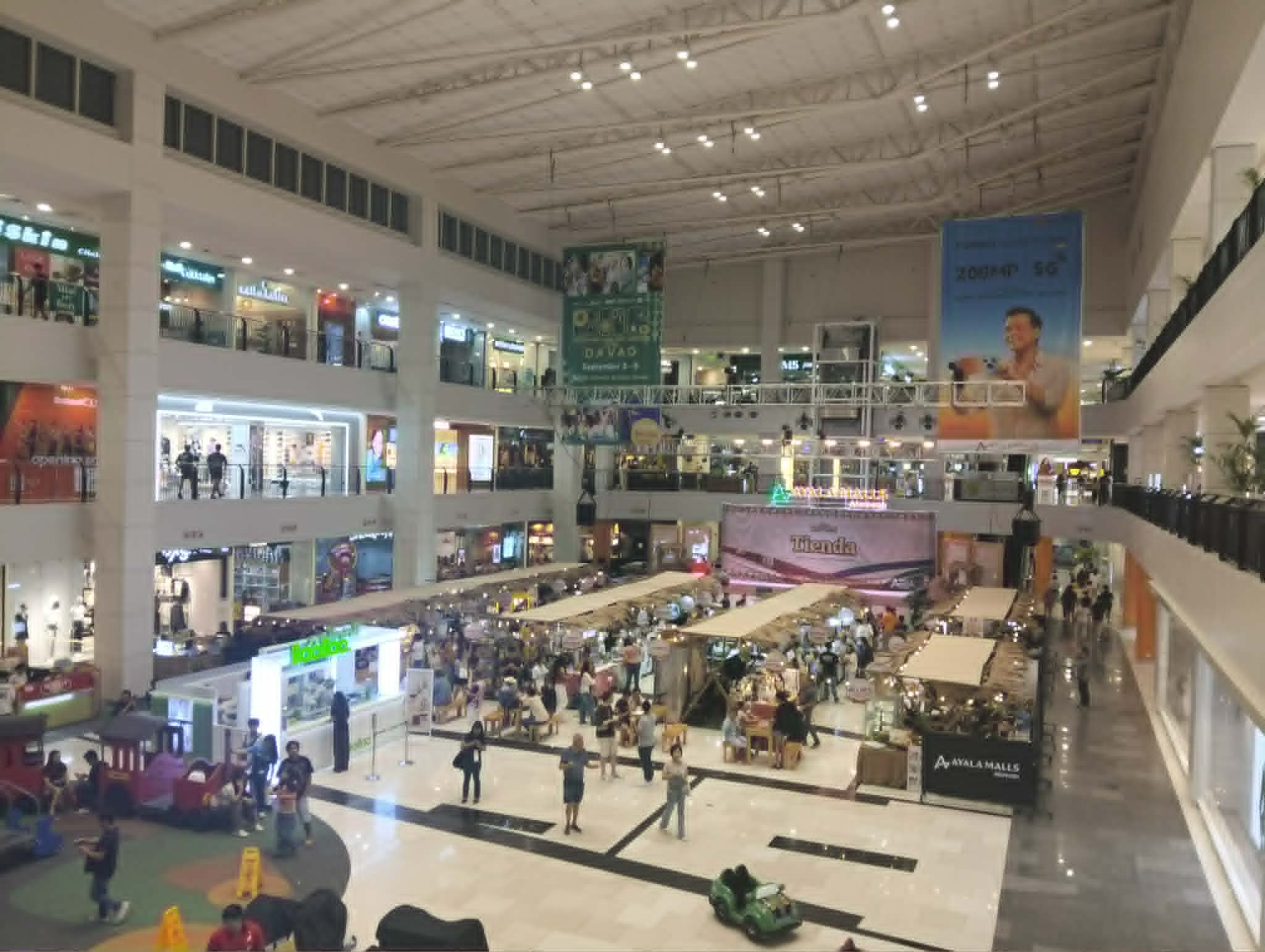
The atrium of Ayala Malls Abreeza as of August 2026.

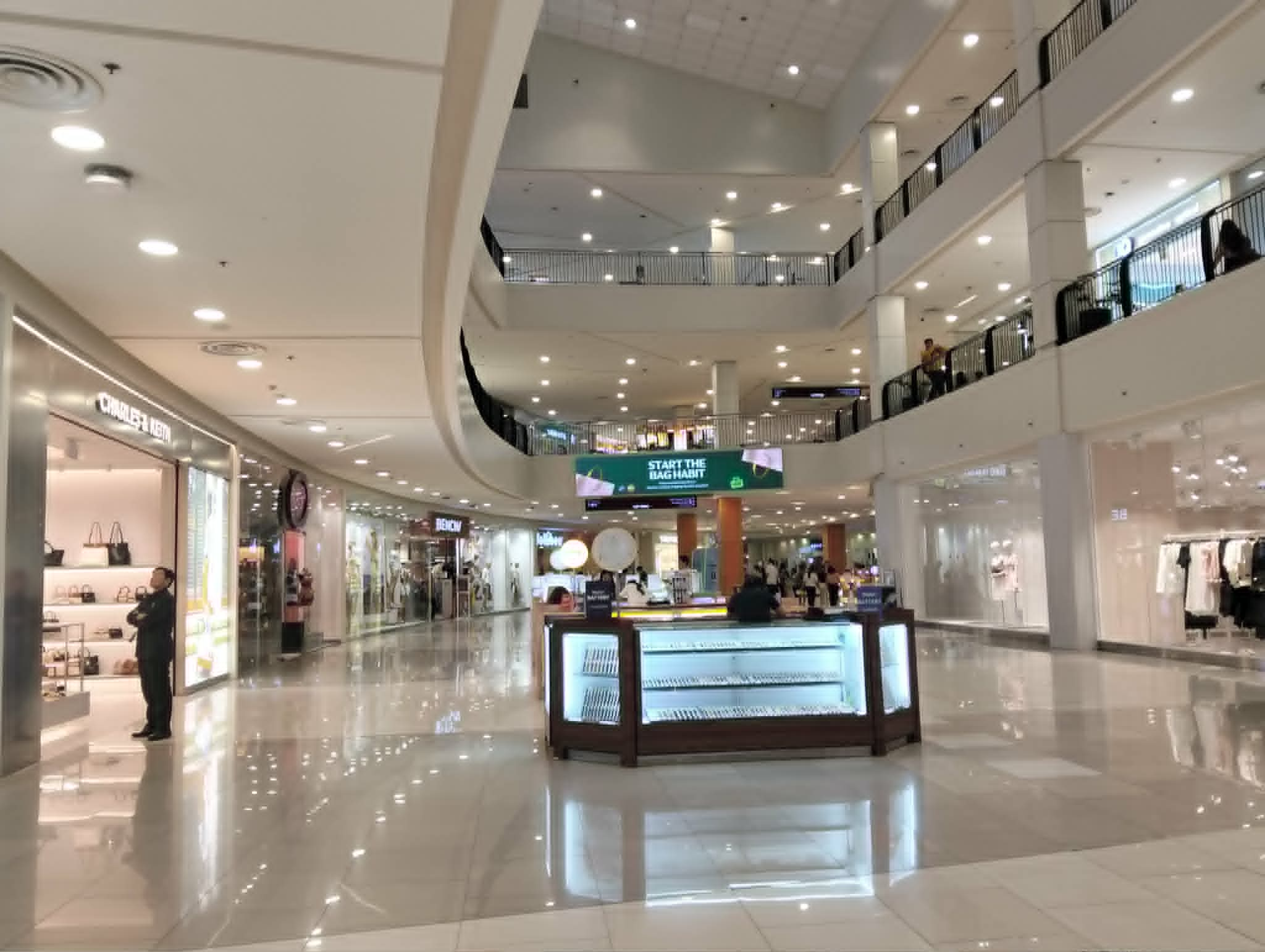
The concourse approaching the atrium in Abreeza.

Ayala Malls Abreeza or simply known as Abreeza is a large shopping mall complex located at J.P. Laurel Avenue, Bajada in Davao City, Philippines. It is the first Ayala Shopping Center located in Mindanao. It opened on May 12, 2011. It is owned by Accendo Commercial Corporation, a joint venture company of Ayala Land and Anflocor.

The 4-story mall lies within a 4-hectare space of the 10-hectare commercial complex. Also in the same complex stands a 4-storey Robinson's Mall. At least three hectares of the entire property will be sold for residential or commercial purposes, including a hotel and residential condominium projects Abreeza Residences and Abreeza Place.

== Abreeza-Ayala Corporate Center ==
Abreeza Corporate Center is an 8-story information technology (IT) center right beside the existing Abreeza Mall. The first three floors of the IT center will be dedicated to the retail expansion of the mall within the project. The remaining floors will be the office portion of the building that accommodates the business process outsourcing companies.

== Seda hotel Abreeza ==
Seda Hotel is a 12-storey hotel owned by Ayala Land which has 186 rooms.

== Future redevelopment ==
Ayala Malls Abreeza is undergoing a 15,000 sqm expansion set to be completed in the second half of 2028 to house more retail spaces. The expansion wing encompasses of 5 floors with the first 3 floors dedicated to retail areas and the 4th and 5th floors being used for offices spaces.

There will also be an overhaul of the interior of the main mall that includes modernized restrooms, a basement parking facelift, redesigned roof garden with an overhead canopy, etc.

The mall will introduce new brands like Footlocker, Hoka, Flying Tiger Copenhagen, Oakley, Bandai Gashapon, and Maison Margiela.

== Incidents ==
=== 2025 Davao Oriental Earthquakes ===
During the 2025 Davao Oriental Earthquakes, several ceiling tiles in the concourse fell while people were still inside the mall. This causes panic among those who are inside the mall. No injuries or casualties were reported.

=== 2026 Mindanao earthquake ===
Following the 2026 Mindanao earthquake, the mall sustained structural damage, including the cracks on its walls and the collapse of several ceiling tiles. As a result, the Office of the City Building Official (OCBO) issued a yellow tag in the affected section of the mall, specifically the area facing H&M and Fully Booked, a bookstore. No casualties were reported, as the mall was closed and no one occupied the mall when the earthquake happened.

== Gallery ==
Concourse

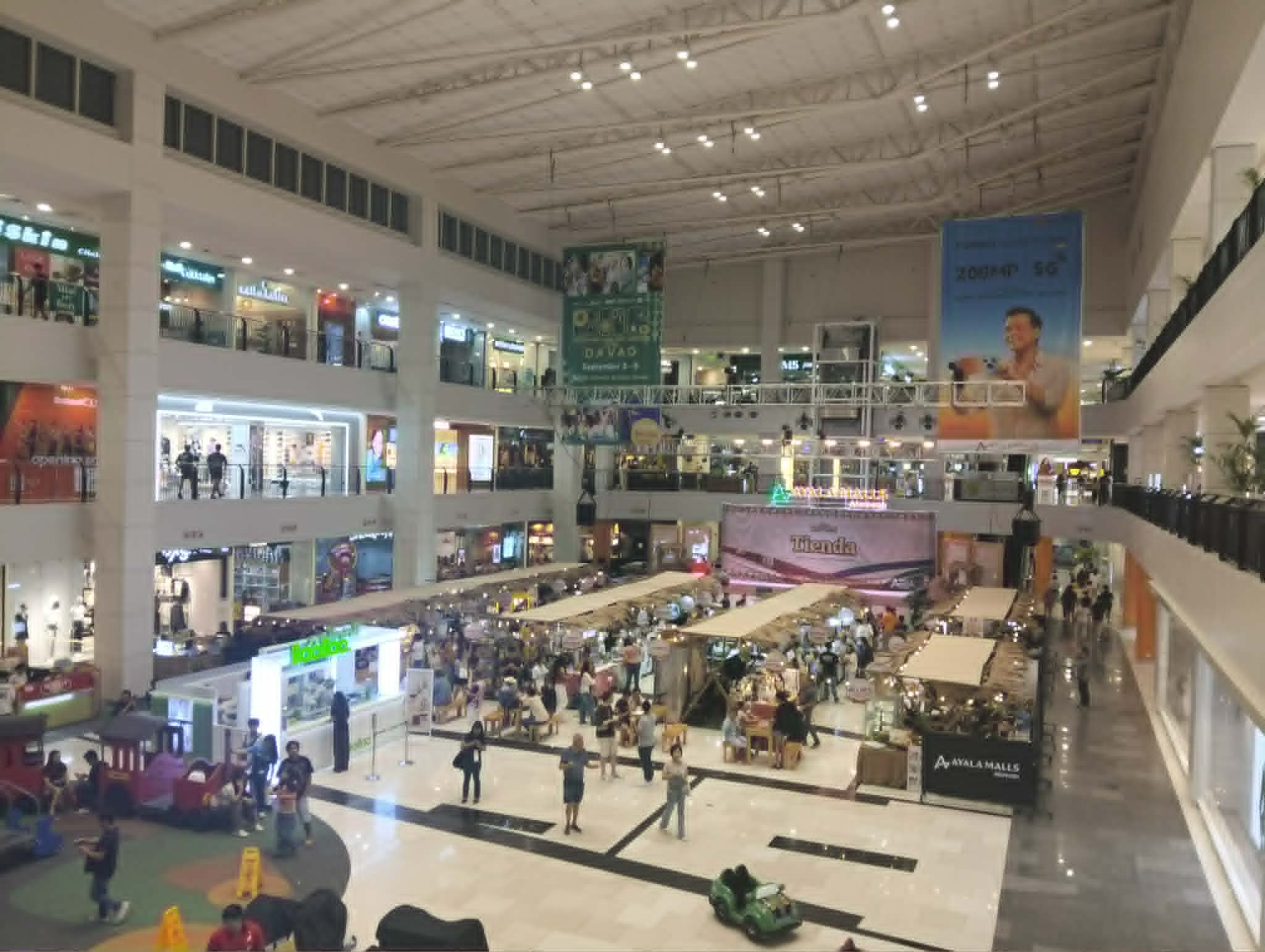
Activity Center

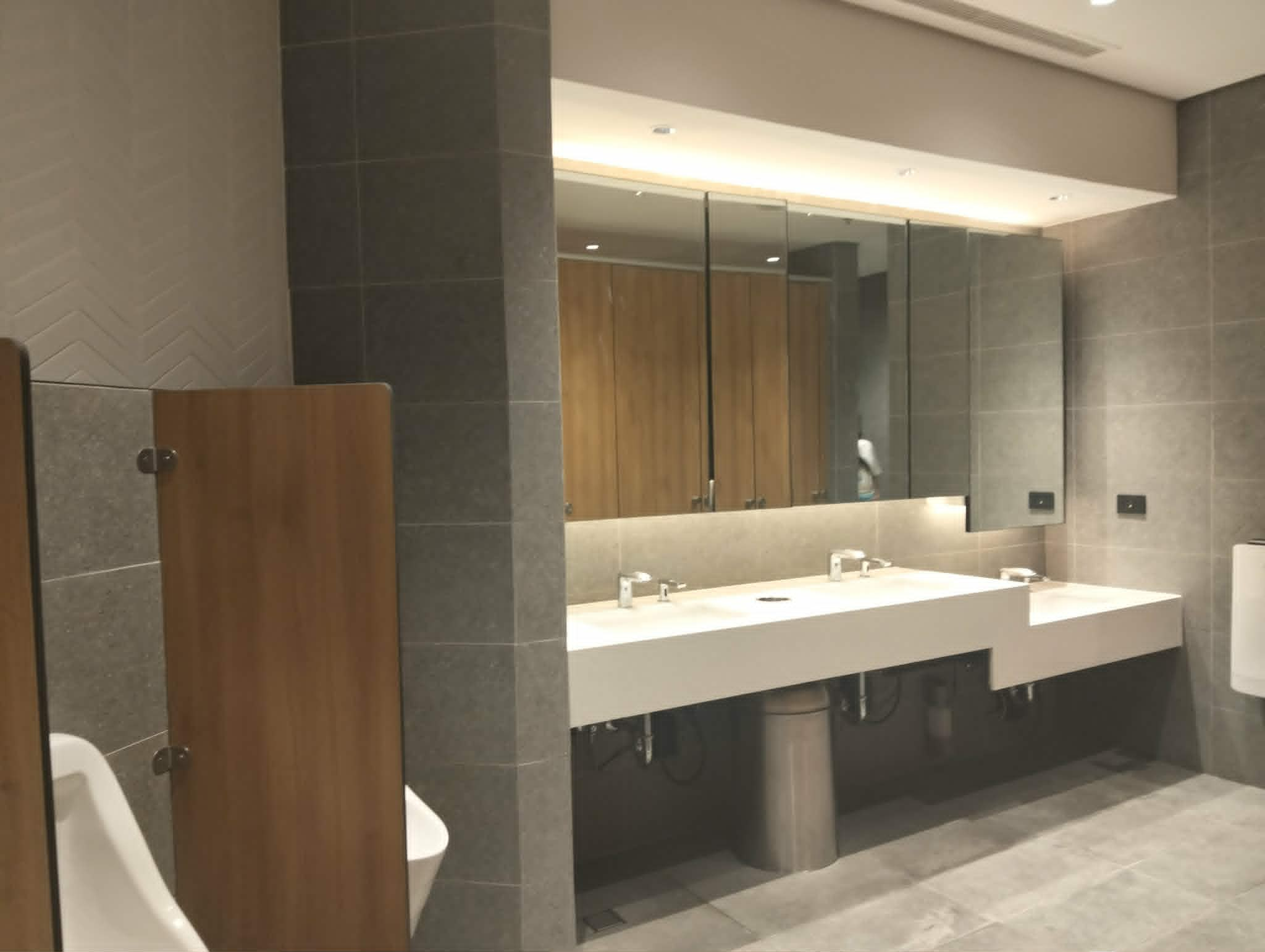
Refreshed Comfort room

Underground Parking lot

H&M

== See also ==
- Ayala Malls
- SM Lanang Premier
- SM City Davao
- Davao City
