= SM Lanang =

Shopping mall in Davao City, Philippines

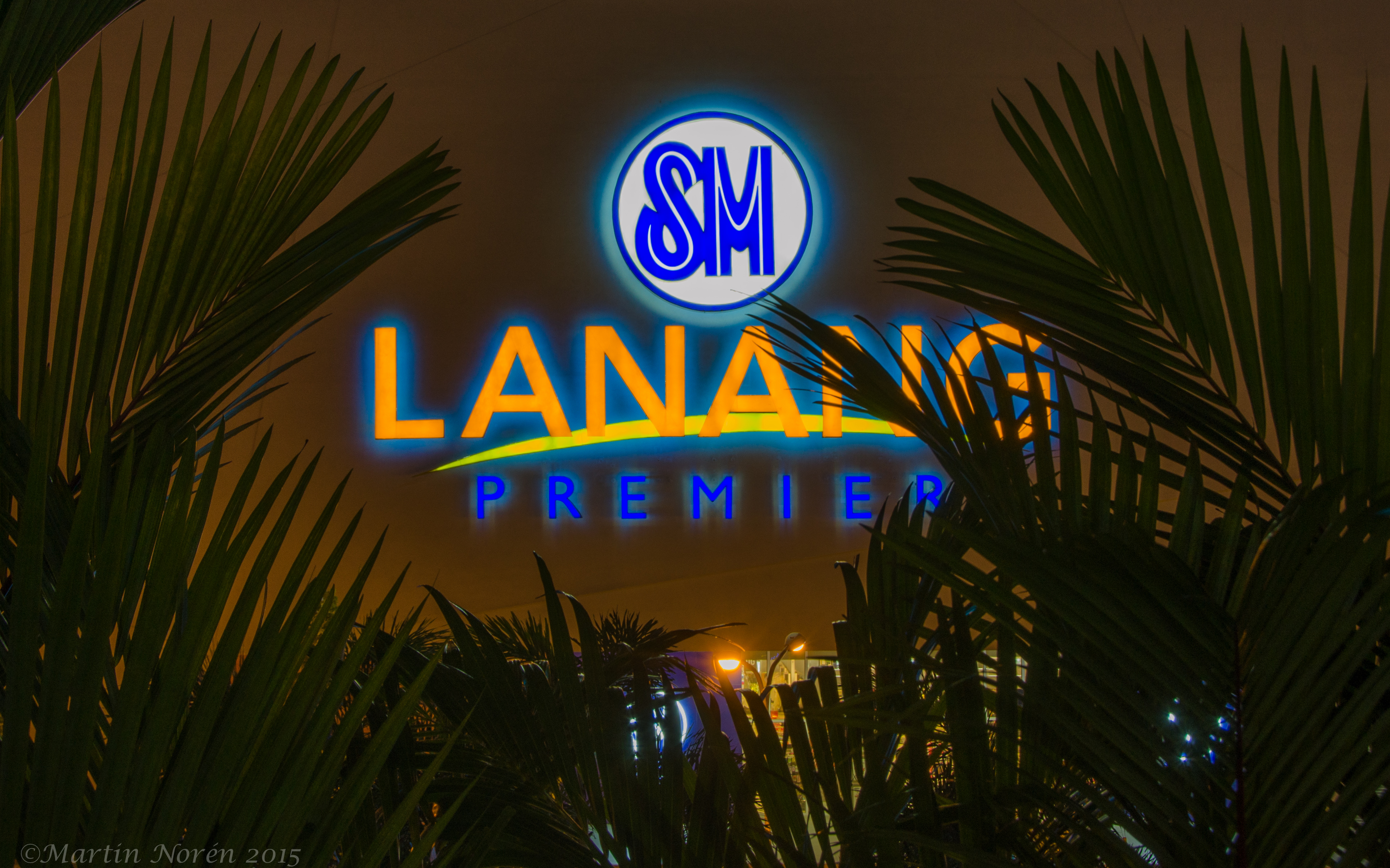
- The facade of SM Lanang in December 2014
- Location: Davao City, Philippines
- Coordinates: 7°05′55.67″N 125°37′52.11″E
- Address: J.P. Laurel Avenue, Brgy. San Antonio, Agdao District
- Opened: February 28, 2012; 14 years ago
- Previous names: SM Lanang Premier (2011–2023)
- Developer: SM Prime Holdings
- Manager: SM Prime Holdings
- Architect: Point Design Inc.
- Num. of stores: 273
- Num. of anchor tenants: 2
- Floor area: 133,000 m^{2} (1,430,000 sq ft)
- Floors: 4
- Public transit: Sasa via JP Laurel Sasa via R Castillo Doña Pilar-Roxas Ave.; Panacan via JP Laurel Panacan-SM City; Tibungco-Roxas Ave. Bunawan-Roxas Ave. Lasang-Roxas Ave.; R783 Panacan (via Angliongto) R793 Panacan (via R. Castillo); Future: M3 M4 SM Lanang
- Website: SM Lanang

SM Lanang, formerly known as SM Lanang Premier, is an indoor four-story shopping mall in Lanang, Davao City, Philippines along Jose P. Laurel Avenue and within S.P Dakudao loop. It was the first SM Supermall under the "Premier" branding (now discontinued). The mall is owned by Henry Sy, Sr. and managed by SM Prime Holdings. Construction of the mall started in 2011 and opened to the public on February 28, 2012, on the site of the former Lanang Golf and Country Club.

The mall has a gross floor area of 133,000 m^{2} (1,430,000 sq ft) making it one of the largest shopping malls in Mindanao. The mall has 273 stores along with several restaurants. The mall has the SM Store and SM Supermarket as anchor stores. It features six cinemas, an IMAX Theater, SMX Convention Center, SM Science Discovery Center (now closed since 2015), a bowling center, and an Al fresco dining situated along the fountain court, located at the back of the mall. SM Lanang is the 4th largest taxpayer in Davao City along with SM City Davao.

== History ==
SM Lanang Premier's first logo from 2011 to 2022.

=== Planning and construction ===
Front facade with SM Lanang Premier branding in December 2012

SM Prime Holdings developed SM Lanang, a Philippine-based shopping center management firm. In 2008, SM Prime Holdings bought 10 hectares out of the 40-hectare property of Lanang Golf and Country Club from Dakudao and Sons for the mall. SM Prime Holdings saw potential in the upscale northern sections of the city. The mall was to be an SM City Mall, a shopping mall with SM Store, SM Supermarket or SM Hypermarket and SM Cinemas together with retail shops, and it was scheduled to open in 2011. The management planned that the mall would be bigger than SM City Davao, the first SM Mall in Mindanao. This original plan would have generated over 1,000 jobs. Moreover, local people unofficially named the mall as SM North Davao. Officers of SM Prime Holdings requested anonymity because they could not discuss project details. The administration planned to start the mall project in January 2010. However, the management moved the start to 2011, together with SM City General Santos.

Tenant partners, retailers, food chains, service centers and merchants attended the tenant's preview of SM Lanang on March 22, 2012. SM Prime Holdings announced the mall's name as SM Lanang Premier. Point Design, Inc. designed the mall. G&W Architects was the Architect of Record; NGCB was the General Contractor; D.A. Abcede and Associates was the Project Manager; Edge its Cinema Designer; Abesamis-Guerrero was the SMX Convention Center Designer, (Note: SMX Convention Center and Trade Hall do have the same functions but do not have the same branding and both are managed by SMX Convention Specialist Corporation (SMX Corp.) under SM Hotels and Conventions Corporation.) and HBO+EMTB was the Cyberzone designer.

In 2023, the mall was renamed to SM Lanang as part of a rebrand of Premier SM malls that don't carry the said branding.

=== Opening ===
SM Lanang Premier's second logo from 2022 to 2023.

Eight days before it opened, SM Lanang had 160 out of 273 stores occupied. The mall opened to the public on September 28, 2012. Its operating hours are from 10:00 am until 9:00 pm A sellout crowd filled the mall during its opening, causing motorists and commuters trouble as they got stuck in heavy traffic along Jose P. Laurel Avenue. At the time it opened, the mall's occupancy rate was 91%.

=== Expansion ===
There are plans to expand the mall that is set to begin around 2026, starting at the right side of the mall between the existing structure and SMDC's upcoming Lane Residences..

== Location ==
SM Lanang is SM Prime Holdings' fourth mall in Mindanao after SM City Davao, SM City CDO Uptown and SM City General Santos and also second mall in Davao City and region. It is on the site of the previous Lanang Golf and Country Club in Lanang, Davao City. It is 2.5 km (1.6 mi) away from Francisco Bangoy International Airport and 4 km (2.5 mi) away from Port of Davao. (Note: Although reference states that SMX Convention Center is 2.5 and 4 km (1.6 and 2.5 mi) respectively, it is stated that SMX Convention Center is inside of SM Lanang Premier, in which those facts for SMX Convention Center Davao can also be applied for SM Lanang Premier, given it is inside of SM Lanang Premier.) Additionally, S.P Dakudao loop bordered the mall and Jose P. Laurel Avenue to its north. The mall is near AH26 and R. Castillo Street, which vehicles use as an access and exit point. The mall is also near to Davao Museum.

== Features ==
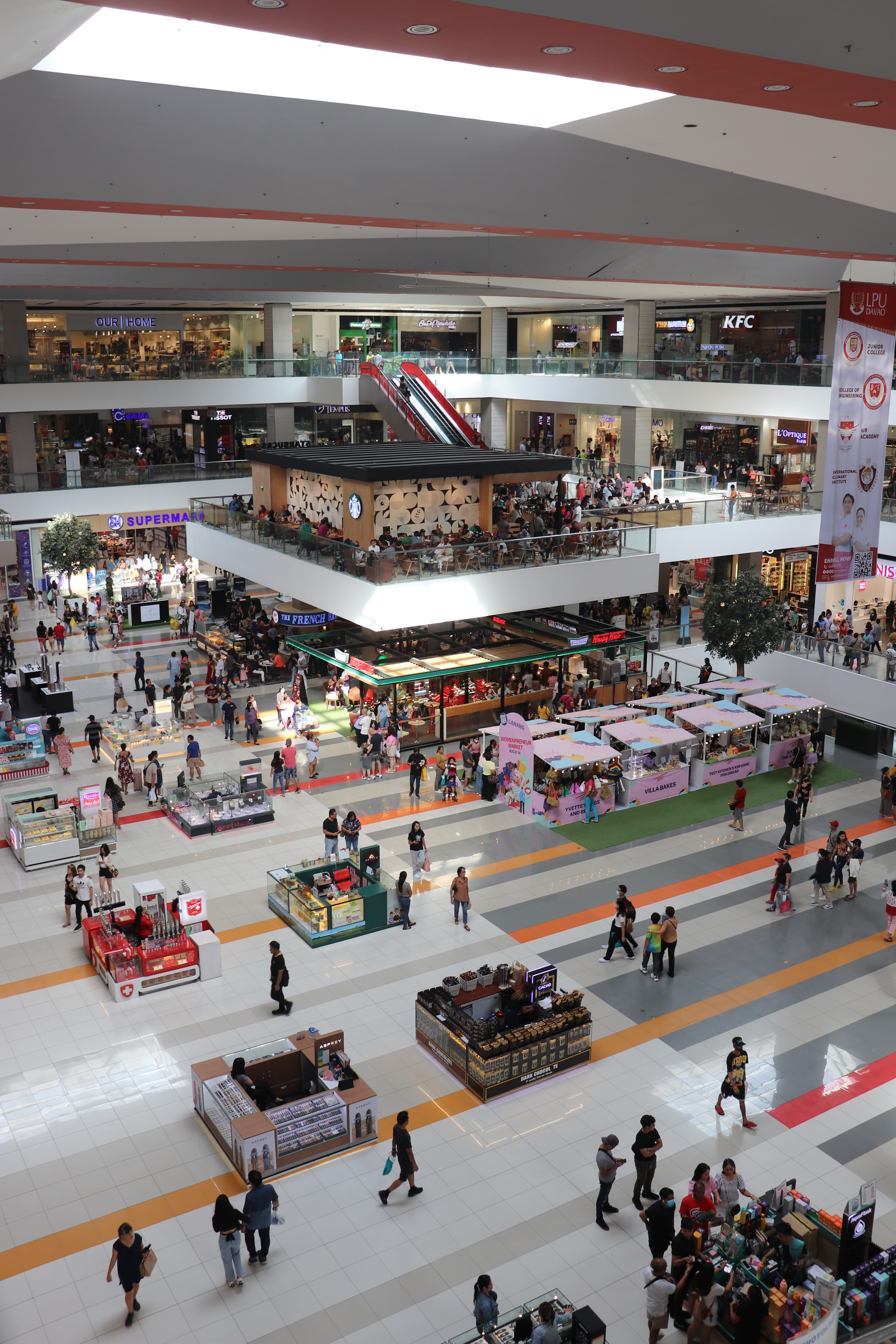
Interior of SM Lanang in August 2023.

=== Design ===
Origami, the traditional Japanese art of paper folding, became the inspiration for the mall's exterior design. Thus, the mall's north, south, and west facades employed the use of various asymmetric lines.

=== Operations ===
In March 2013, SM Lanang hosted the M.I.C.E convention along with the annual Philippine Advertising Congress, accommodating 5,000 people. As of August 2013, the mall's daily foot traffic has seen 20,000 people on weekdays and 40,000 on weekends.

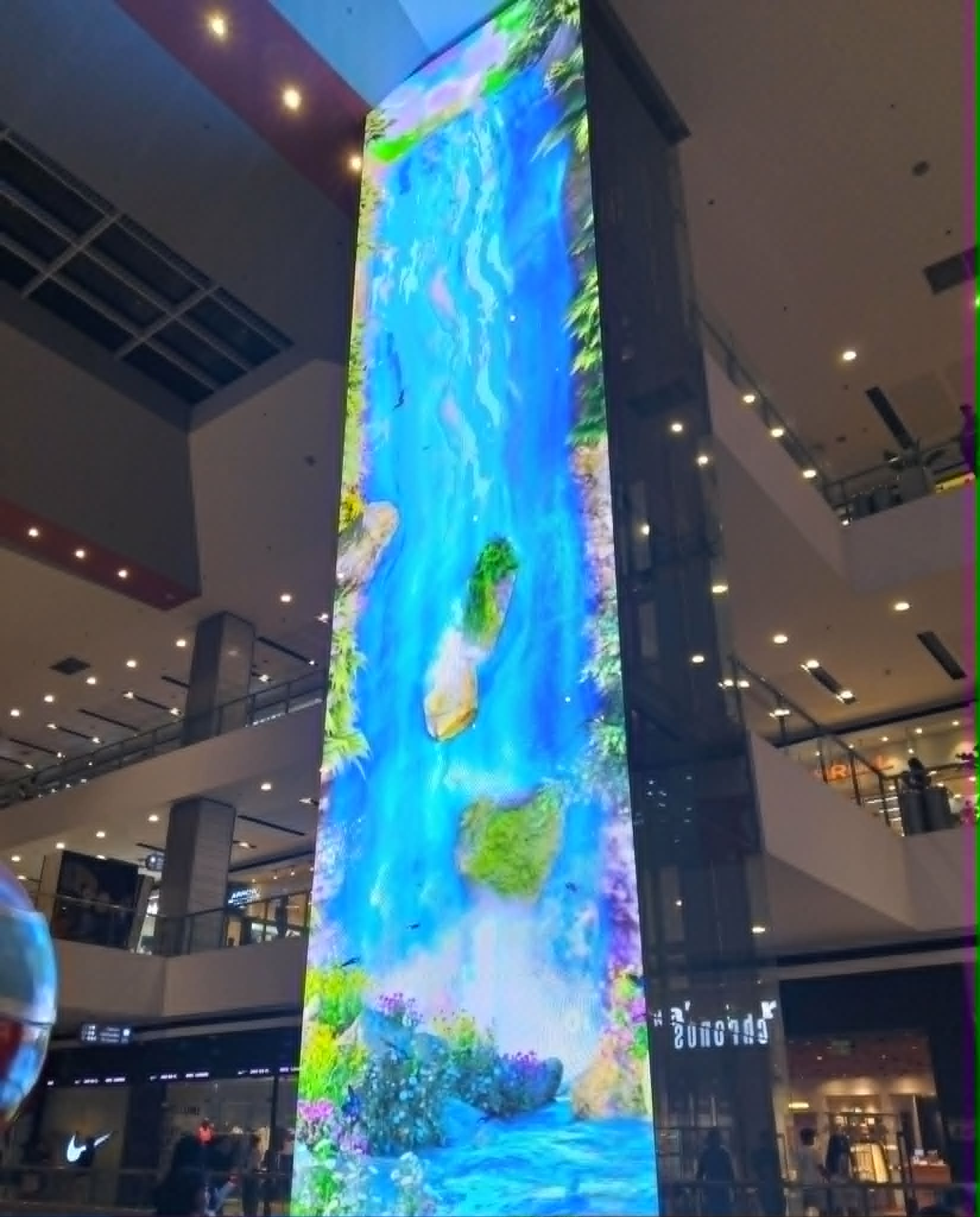
The semi-transparent led screen that was inaugurated in August 2025.

=== LED-Screen ===
On August 2025, SM Lanang inaugurated the 17-meter-tall indoor Semi-transparent "Visions of paradise" LED-Screen. it is considered to be the first and largest led screen on the island of Mindanao.

== Economic impact ==
SM Lanang serves as a major tourist attraction in Davao City and is the 4th largest taxpayer in the area, together with SM City Davao. As of 2013, it has an income tax return of ₱8 million. The mall employed 10,000 people in 2012. IBEX Global Solutions opened a Business process outsourcing within the mall last October 2013 with a gross floor area of 3,500 m^{2} (38,000 sq ft) which employed additional 700 people. As a result of SM Lanang's very strong profit and Mindanao's growing economy, SM Prime Holdings opened 2 more malls in Mindanao area, one in Butuan and a second mall in Cagayan de Oro. MegaWorld Corporation is planning to open a residential building within the mall's vicinity, with an investment amounting to ₱15 billion. SM Lanang together with SM City Davao accounts for 80% of total profit of SM Prime Holdings in Mindanao.

== See also ==
- List of largest shopping malls in the world
- List of largest shopping malls in the Philippines
- List of shopping malls in the Philippines

== Notes ==
Preceded by SM City General Santos	46th SM Supermall; 2012	Succeeded by SM Aura
