= SM City Bacolod =

- Location: Bacolod, Negros Occidental, Philippines
- Coordinates: 10°40′20″N 122°56′39″E
- Address: Rizal Street, Reclamation Area
- Opened: March 1, 2007; 19 years ago
- Developer: SM Prime Holdings
- Manager: SM Prime Holdings
- Num. of stores: 300+
- Num. of anchor tenants: 8 (including 6 junior anchors)
- Floor area: 133,894 m^{2} (1,441,220 sq ft)
- Floors: South Wing: 2; North Wing: 3; North Block: 9
- Parking: Surrounding lots around the complex and a 4-level parking area at the North Block
- Website: SM City Bacolod

SM City Bacolod is a supermall in Bacolod, Negros Occidental, Philippines. It is the 29th supermall of SM Prime Holdings, the first SM supermall in Negros, and the 3rd in the Visayas. It opened on March 1, 2007 and currently has a total land area of 161,096.60 square meters (1,734,029.4 sq ft) and a total floor area of 133,894 square meters (1,441,220 sq ft).

== Location ==
The mall is located in the Reclamation Area of Bacolod City, close to multiple bus stops and a seaport. Drop-offs for most vehicles are found at all main entrances. The mall is just a few meters away from the Bacolod Public Plaza and the San Sebastian Cathedral.

== Mall features ==
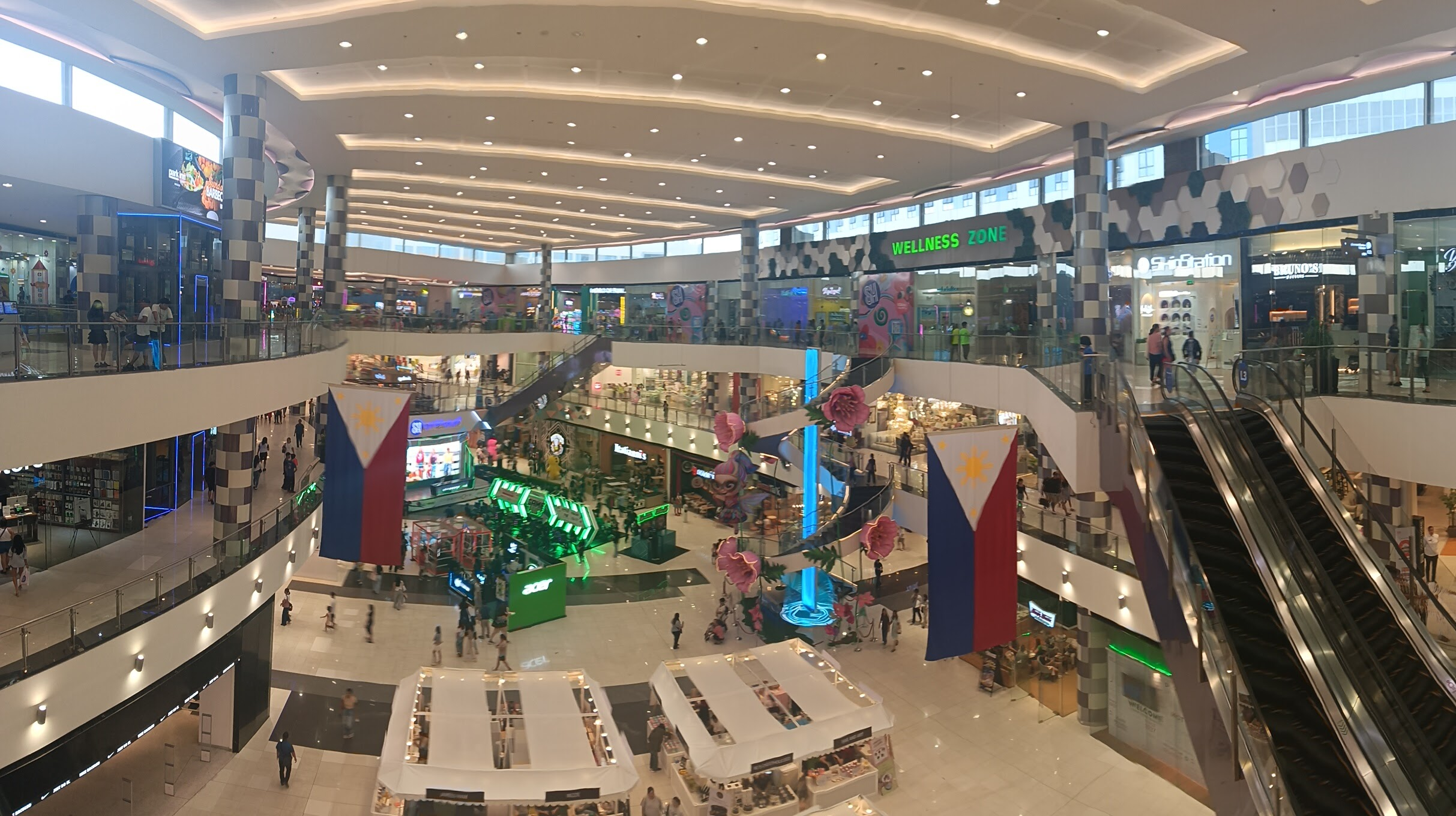
SM City Bacolod Main Atrium

SM City Bacolod is divided into two buildings, called the "North Wing" and the "South Wing". The two buildings are connected by two bridges that allow patrons to walk between the two structures.

Interior of the bridge connecting the North and South wings

Every entrance of the mall is guarded by a security guard. Some entrances have guards that carry a sensor to detect a firearm or another unwanted item inside the mall. Remaining entrances have a security guard present with a screening sensor a customer must walk through.

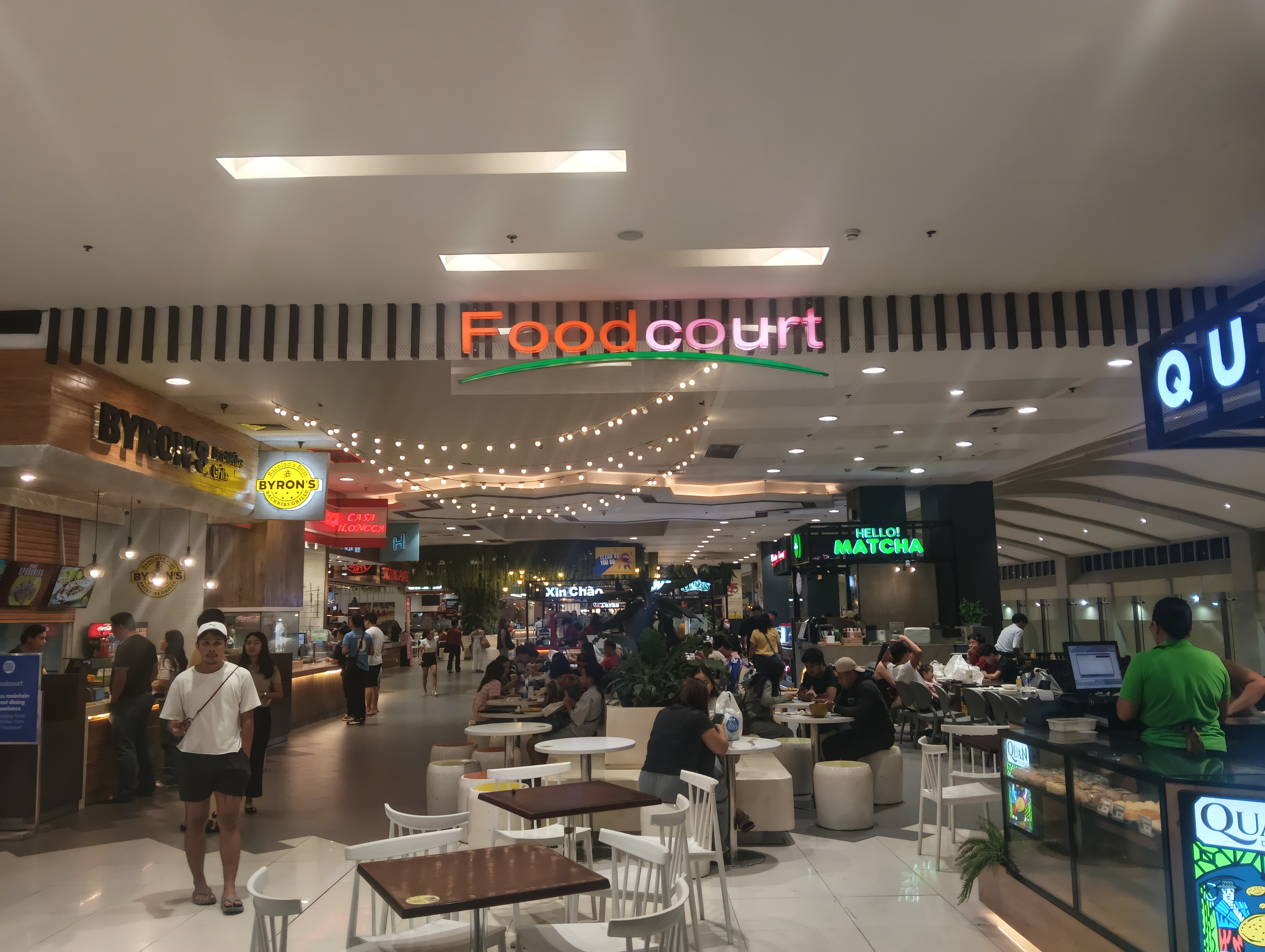
SM Foodcourt

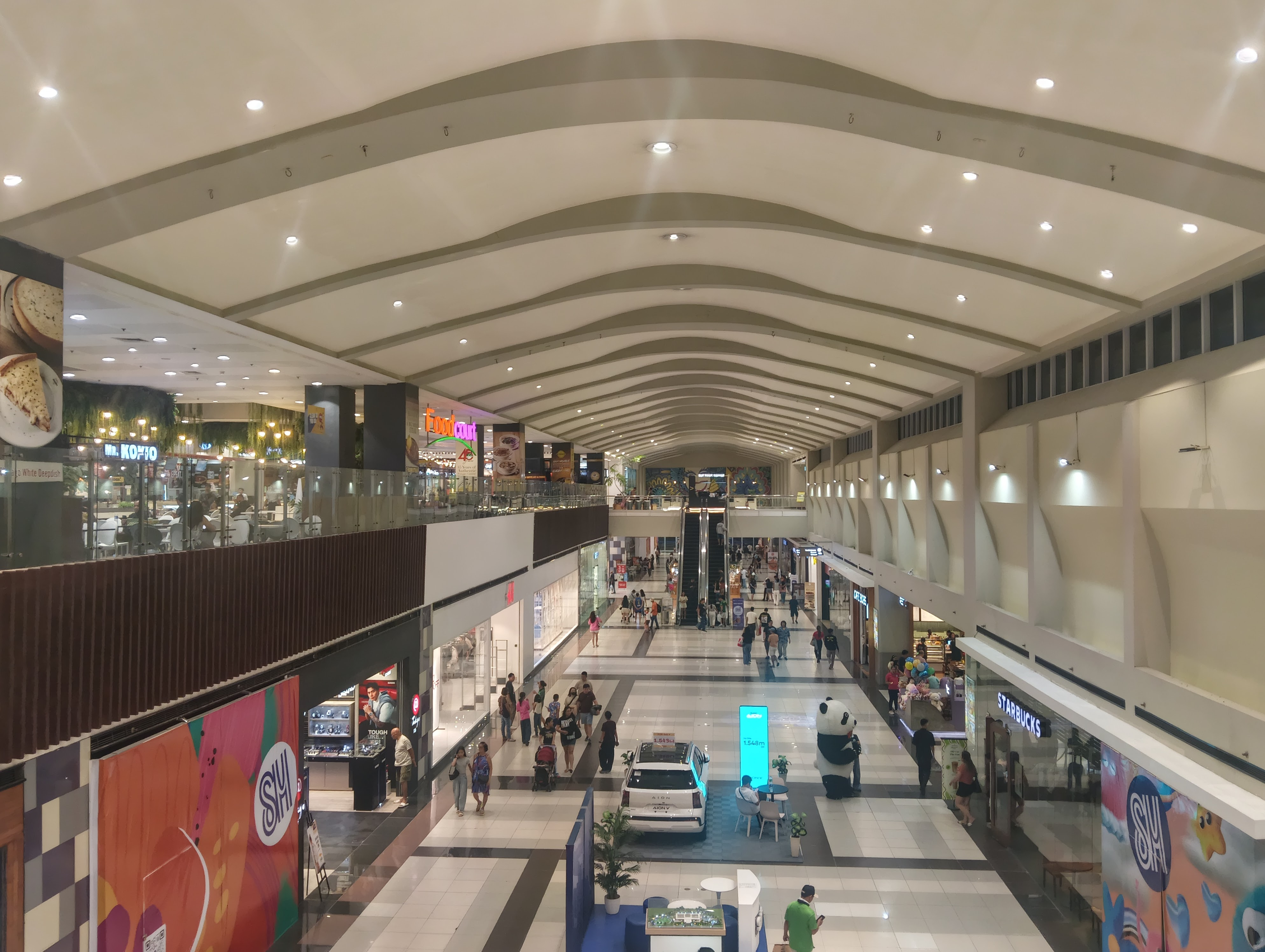
SM City Bacolod Northwing Interior

Both wings feature a variety of restaurants. The North Wing features most of the other storefronts, including department stores, home goods, fashion stores, and arcades. The North Wing also contains the SMX Convention Center Bacolod. The South Wing features four movie theatres and a supermarket. The connecting walkways also contain a few stores and stands.

The North Block beside the North Wing expansion, features additional dining spaces, parking facilities, office spaces, and a campus of National University. The building also features a multi-purpose event venue called the SM Skyhall.

The mall is also generally a location to host festivities. One notable event hosted by the mall was the 2026 MassKara Festival Arena Competition.

== History and expansions ==
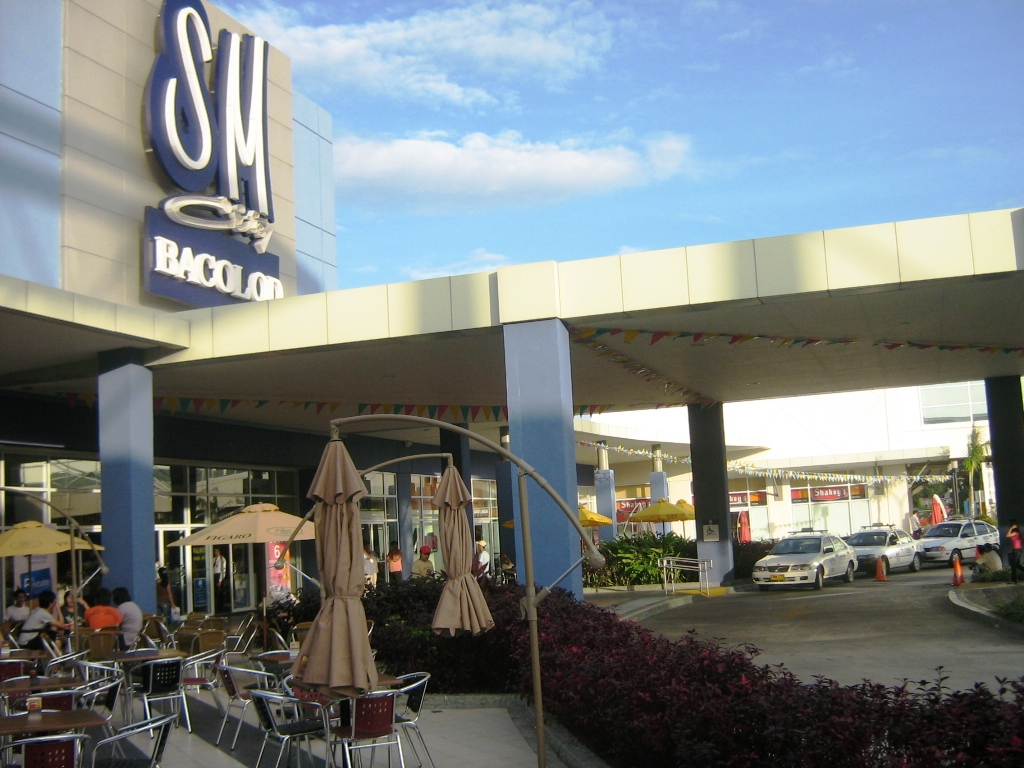
SM City Bacolod in 2007

Originally, SM City Bacolod was composed of two one storey wings (the North and the South). The mall size was 71,759 m^{2} (772,410 sq ft) before any further expansions. Each wing had one major hallway that fit all its stores at the time, and escalators that lead up to the bridges that connect the entire mall.

Expansion of the North Wing began in 2012. In 2013, the mall opened a bigger 3-storey department store on the North Wing.

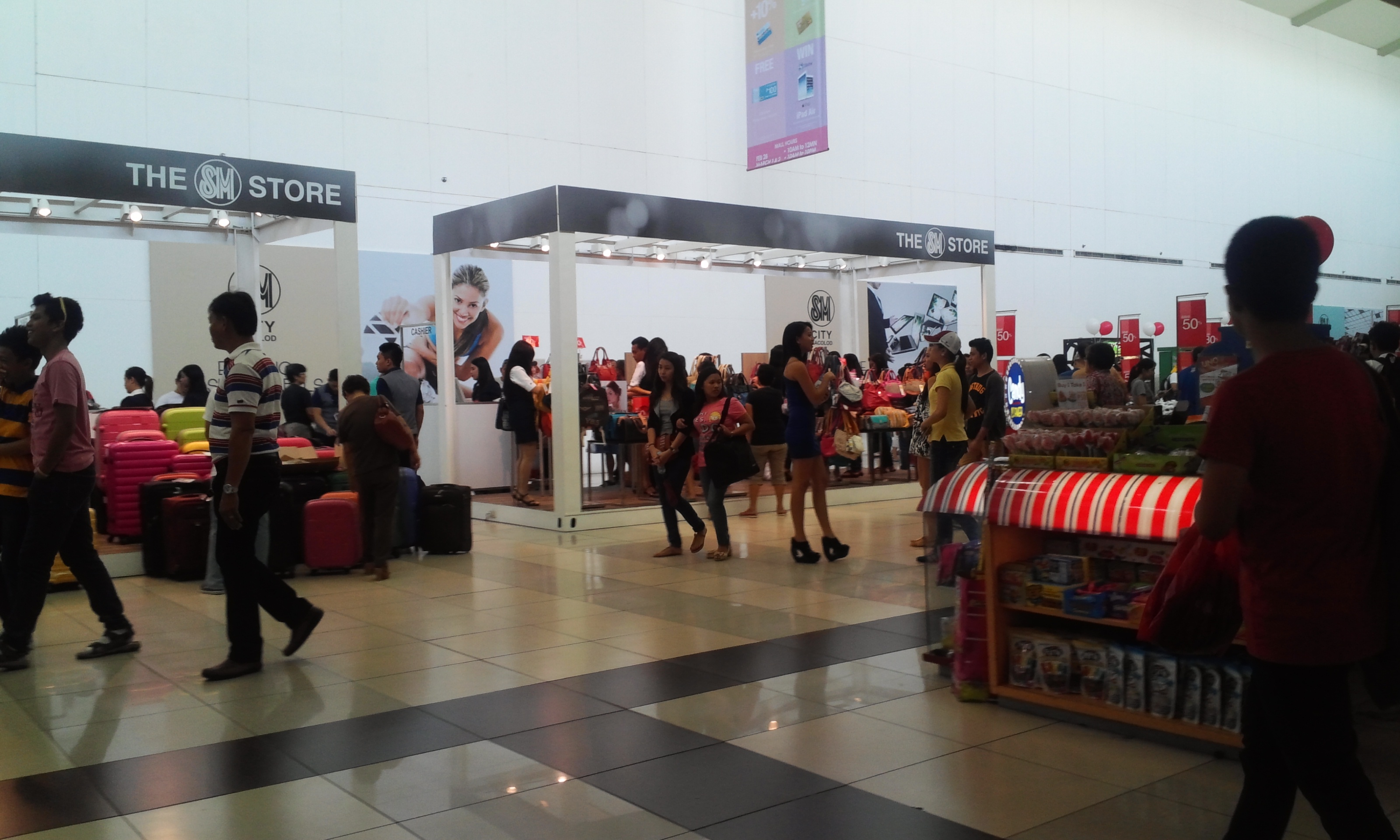
Interior of SM City Bacolod's North Wing during its expansion in 2014

In 2014, the North Wing expansion doubled the mall's floor area. The expansion includes more retail spaces, a larger food court, an expanded Cyberzone, and the SMX Convention Center.

The North Wing section of SM City Bacolod was the main focus of the renovation in 2016.

Plans from the parent company, SM Prime Holdings, have been made for a ₱2.5 billion three-story expansion plan on South wing while the existing mall structure will be extended to two storeys. The expansion will accommodate 150 more store tenants, and is set to be completed in phases. Some tenants have already opened their stores.

In 2023, a government service office was opened on the third floor of the mall.

In 2024, the Bacolod city government closed down 24 stores nearby to make way for a mixed-use building being built by SM Prime Holdings. Tenants of the closed stores were offered temporary space at SM City Bacolod, however nobody accepted the offer.

In 2025, SM officially opened The North Block beside the North Wing expansion, introducing additional dining spaces, parking facilities, office spaces, and a campus of National University. In October 2025, SM further expanded the development with the opening of SM Skyhall, a multi-purpose events venue designed to host sporting events, concerts, graduations, conventions, and other large-scale gatherings.

== Mall complex developments ==
=== Park inn by Radisson Bacolod ===
Park inn by Radisson Bacolod

Opened in 2020, the hotel is built next to the North Wing and features 153 rooms.

=== Smile Residences ===
Currently under construction, it is the first SMDC development in Bacolod, it is a three 10-storey condominium complex located in front of the South Wing.

== Gallery ==
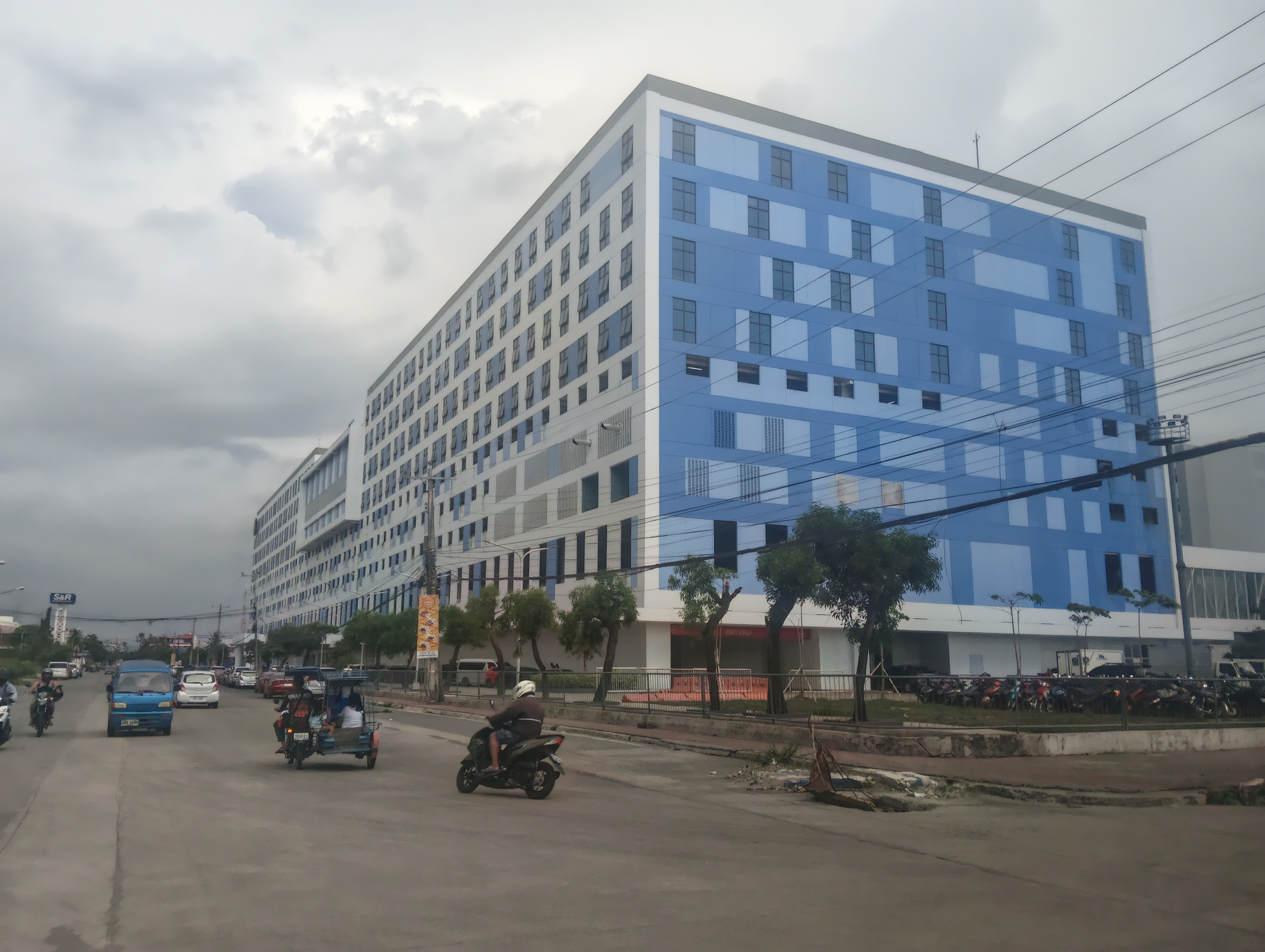
SM City Bacolod North Block, opened in 2025

Interior of SM North Block

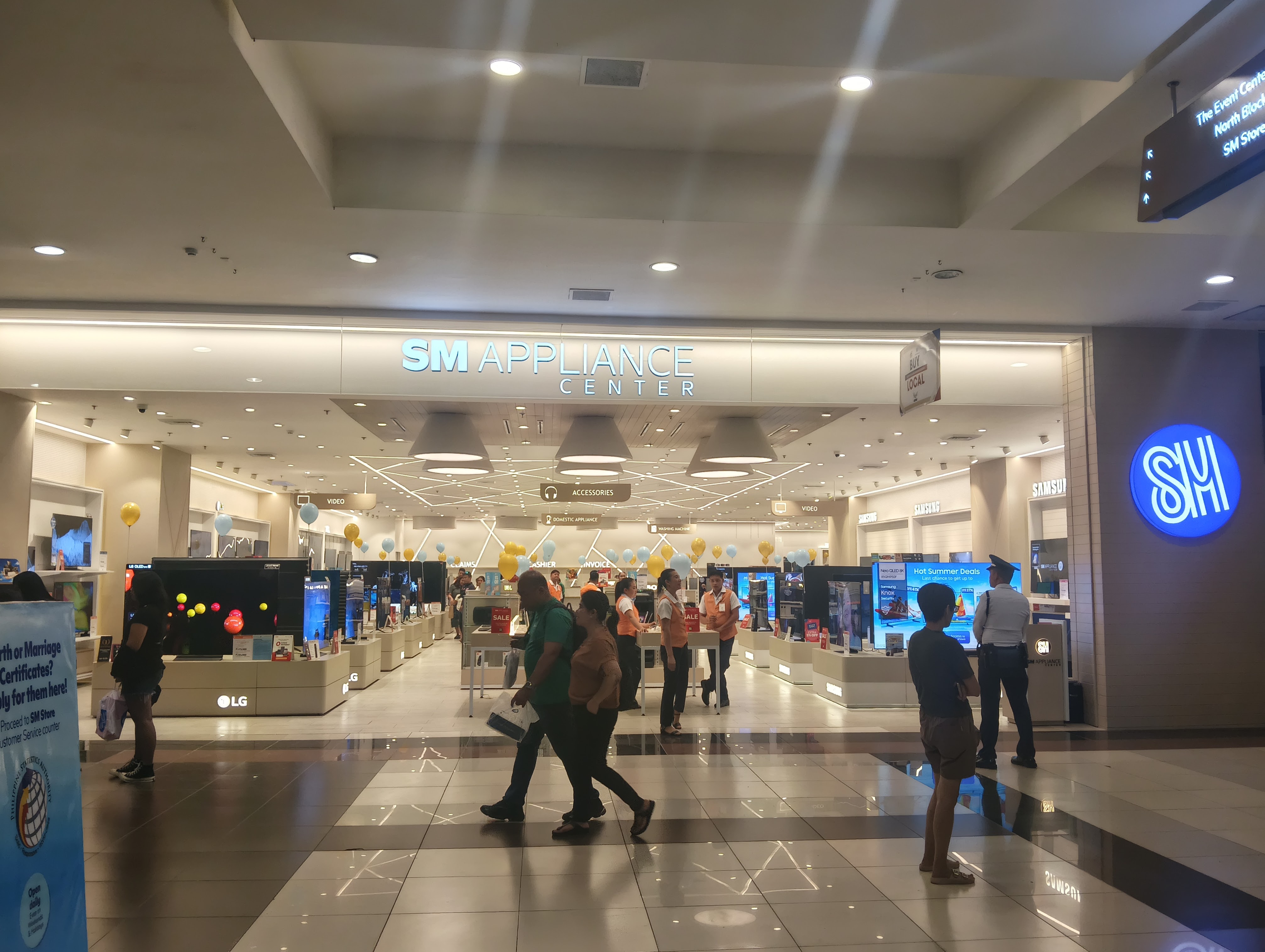
SM Appliance Center

SM Store Bacolod

SM Cinema

The annual MassKara Festival Streetdance and Arena Competition was held SM City Bacolod for the first time in 2026

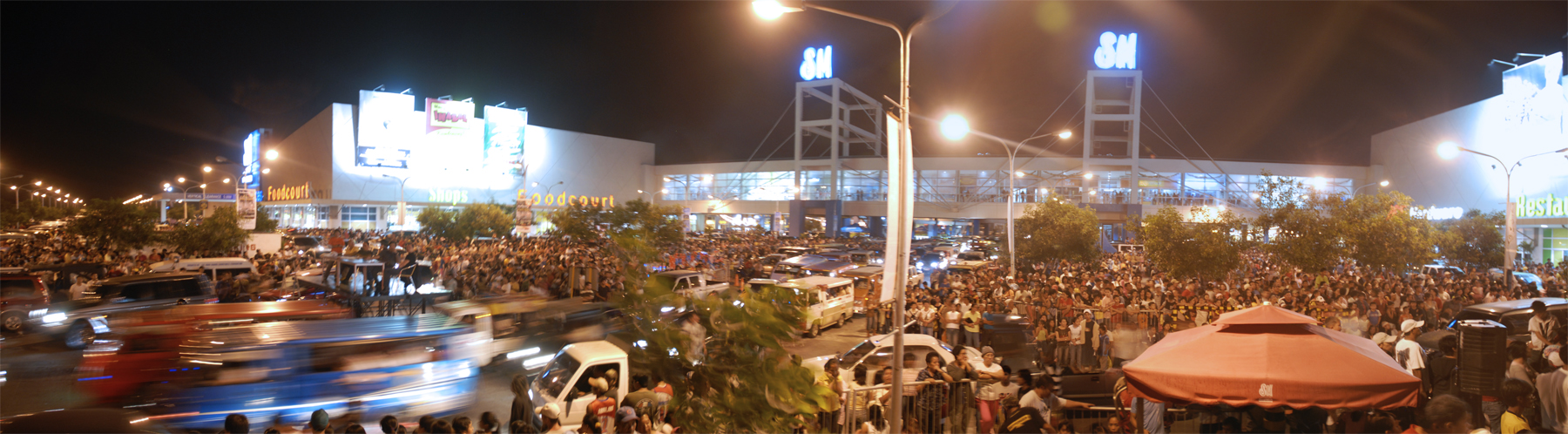
Panoramic view of the mall in 2007

Aerial view of SM City Bacolod in 2023

== See also ==
- SM City Cebu
- SM City Davao
- SM City Iloilo
- SM Seaside City
- SM J Mall
- Capitol Central

Preceded by SM City Lipa	28th SM Supermall; 2007	Succeeded by SM City Taytay
