= SM Aura =

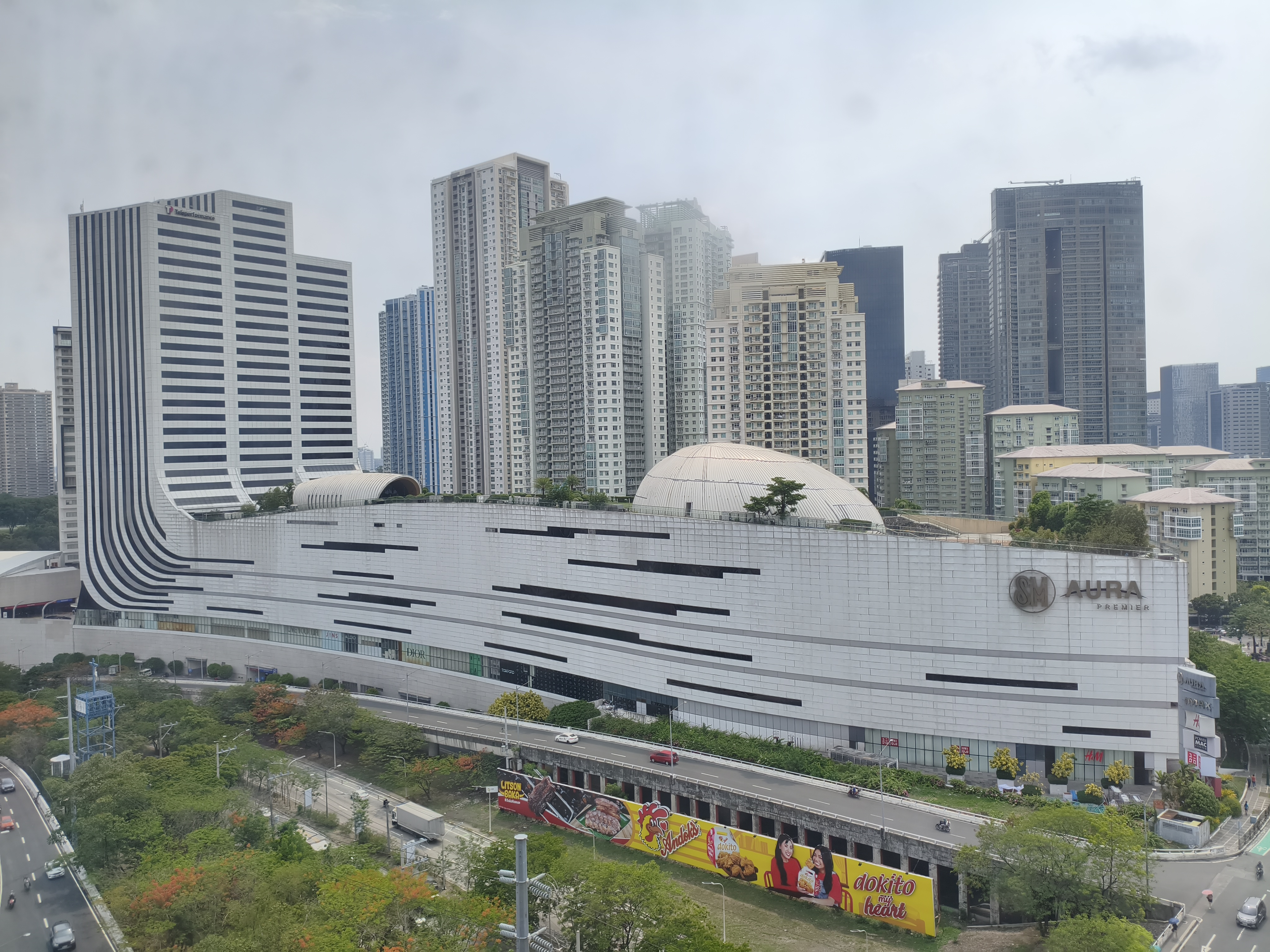
- SM Aura In June 2025
- Location: Bonifacio Global City, Taguig, Philippines
- Coordinates: 14°32′50″N 121°03′15″E
- Address: 26th Street corner McKinley Parkway
- Opened: May 17, 2013; 13 years ago
- Previous names: SM Aura at the Civic Center (c. 2011); SM Aura Premier at the Bonifacio Civic Center (c. 2013); SM Aura Premier at the Fort (2013); SM Aura Premier (2013–2023)
- Developer: SM Prime Holdings
- Manager: SM Prime Holdings
- Owner: SM Prime Holdings
- Architect: Arquitectonica
- Num. of stores: 300+
- Num. of anchor tenants: 8
- Floor area: 200,000 m^{2} (2,200,000 sq ft)
- Floors: Mall: 8 upper + 3 basement Tower: 29 upper
- Parking: ≈ 1,700 slots
- Public transit: Market! Market!: AS02 AS10 C01 EX02 NR11 WR12; 15 16 Market! Market! Future: MMS Bonifacio Global City
- Website: SM Aura

SM Aura ([ˈaʊɾa]; formerly SM Aura Premier) is a large upscale shopping mall located at 26th Street corner McKinley Parkway, Bonifacio Global City, Barangay Fort Bonifacio, Taguig, Philippines, owned by SM Prime Holdings, the country's largest mall developer. It is the 13th SM Supermall in Metro Manila and 47th SM Prime mall in the Philippines. It was the 2nd SM Supermall under the "Premier" branding (now discontinued) after SM Lanang. The shopping center is situated near its rival mall Market! Market!, owned by Ayala Malls, a real estate subsidiary of Ayala Land, and affiliate of Ayala Corporation. It is designed by EDGE Interior Designers and Arquitectonica.

== Etymology ==
The name of SM Aura is derived from chemical symbols Au (gold) and Ra (radium). According to SM Prime Holdings, Inc., the name defines "luxury and elegance that emanates from within."

== History ==
=== Land dispute ===
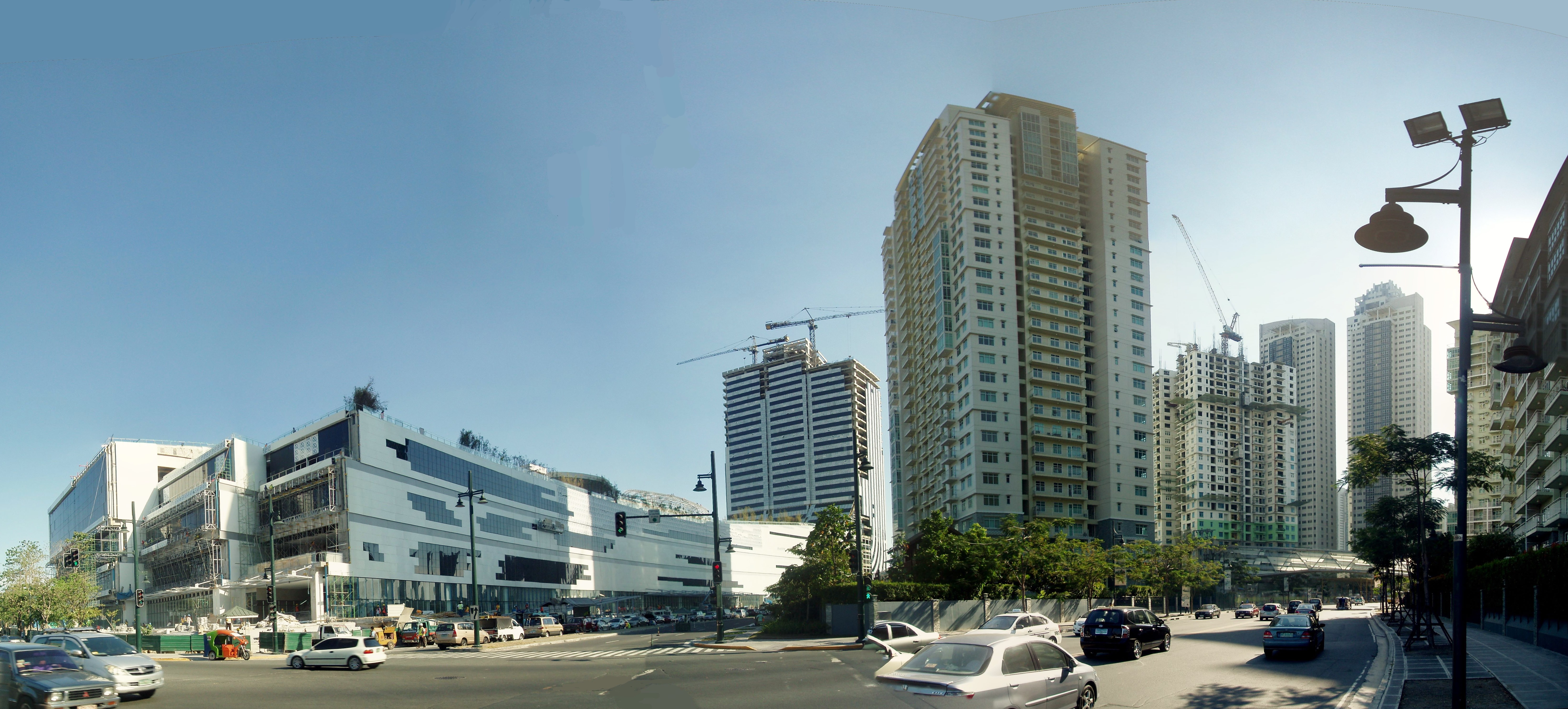
SM Aura Tower under construction in 2013 as seen from 26th Street

SM Aura is built on a land that was involved in a dispute between the Bases Conversion and Development Authority (BCDA) and the Taguig local government. The issue originated from the encroachment of the Manila American Cemetery, under the BCDA, on land designated for a civic center. This was resolved when the BCDA and the local government signed agreements in 1999 and 2004, transferring several parcels of land in Fort Bonifacio to Taguig in exchange for the encroached area.

In 2007, SM Prime Holdings, Inc. (SMPHI) won a public bid to lease and develop a 1.5-hectare (3.7-acre) portion of the property into a mixed-use complex. The local government and SMPHI entered a lease agreement on November 21, 2007, and August 1, 2008, with the Deed of Conveyance (DOC) in 2008 transferring the land to Taguig without restrictions on its use. However, the BCDA later claimed that the construction was illegal, which SMPHI denied, and refuted SMPHI's claim that SM Aura was fully compliant with the DOC between the local government and BCDA.

During his term, Taguig Mayor Sigfrido Tiñga initially went into discussions with the Ayala Group on the use of land. However, the discussions on land use were carried over to the term of his successor, Lani Cayetano.

=== Mall development ===
Logo from 2022 to 2023

The mall was known as SM Aura at the Civic Center or SM Aura Premier at the Bonifacio Civic Center before its formal opening. Construction began in 2011. The mall, named as SM Aura Premier [at the Fort], had its inaugural blessing on May 16, 2013, a day before the grand opening. Numerous celebrities, government officials including Senator Alan Peter Cayetano, Taguig Mayor Lani Cayetano, company officials, and VIP guests attended the blessing, including SM Prime's Henry Sy and Hans Sy, and American actress Sarah Jessica Parker. Parker cut the ribbon for The SM Store, and was the newest endorser for their "Love to Shop" campaign.

The mall went through a renovation in 2023. Updates on the Director's Club Cinema and the rebranded food court known as Food on Four were completed in January and April 2024, respectively.

== Mall features ==
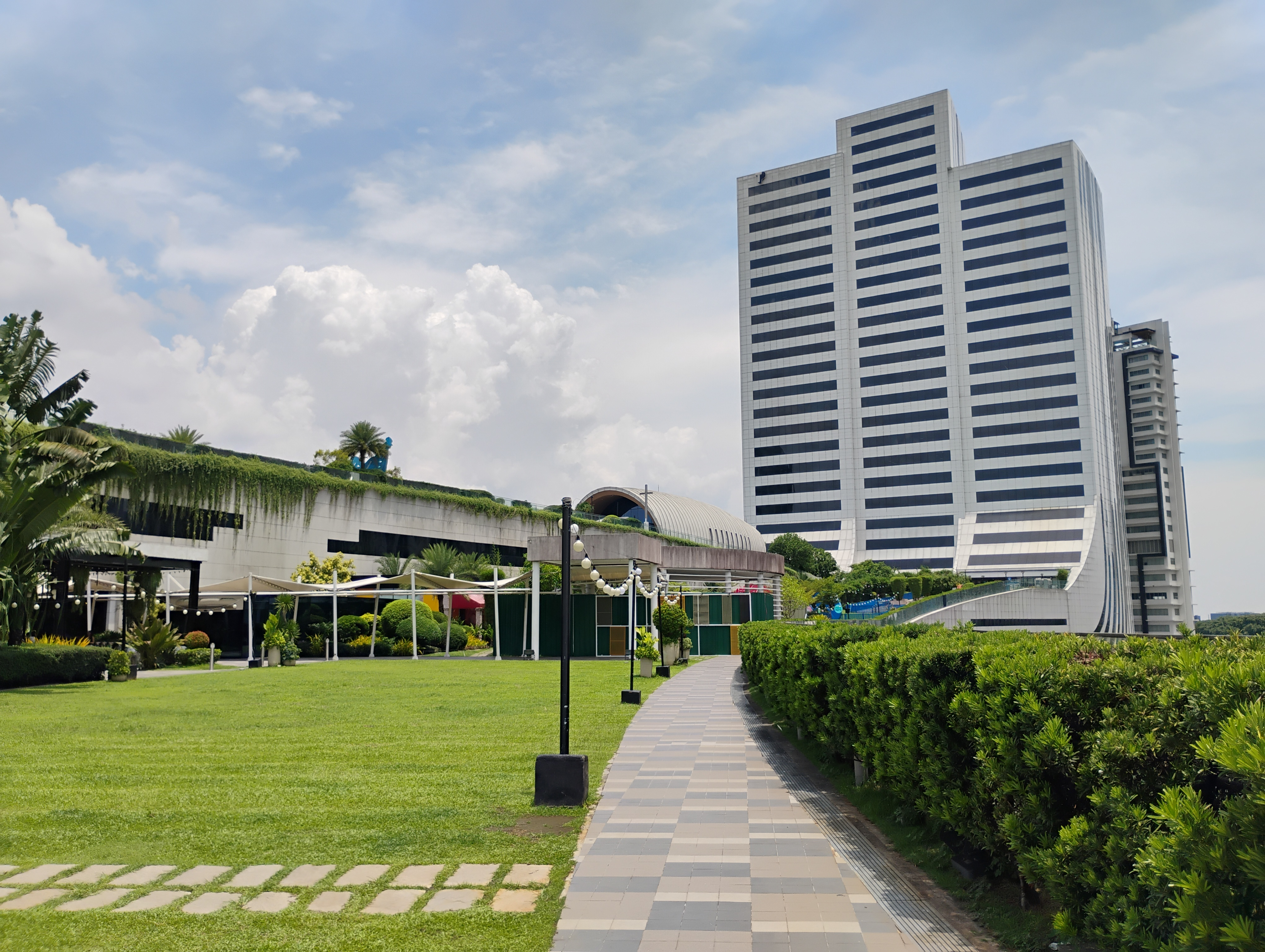
Skypark

Interior of SM Aura

The development includes the Skypark, a multi-level green roof from the fifth to seventh level. It has al fresco bars & restaurants, sculptures and botanical gardens, a 1,000-seat performance hall called Samsung Hall, the 250-seat Chapel of San Pedro Calungsod, and a mini-golf course. A high-end food court named Food on Four is located on the fourth level, while restaurants on the fifth level collectively consist the Dine at the Fifth.

Designed by Miami-based architectural firm Arquitectonica, the structure would be a basic “dumbbell” arrangement determined by the narrow site, with the main entry at the north corner along 26th Street and the office tower located at the southern end. The main vehicular drop-off is provided on the western side accessible through McKinley Parkway, with taxi stations on the first basement level. It also has a three-level basement parking accessible via Minipark Road, McKinley Parkway, and Carlos P. Garcia Avenue's (C-5 Road) southbound service road.

The high-end mall consists high-end and international fashion brands such as Stuart Weitzman, Joseph (UK), Calvin Klein, Stradivarius, Uniqlo, Topman, and Topshop. Other tenants include Crate & Barrel, Ramen Nagi, Todd English Food Hall Manila (now The Food Hall), and Fitness First Platinum. Anchors at the mall include SM Supermarket and The SM Store.

=== SMX Convention Center Aura ===
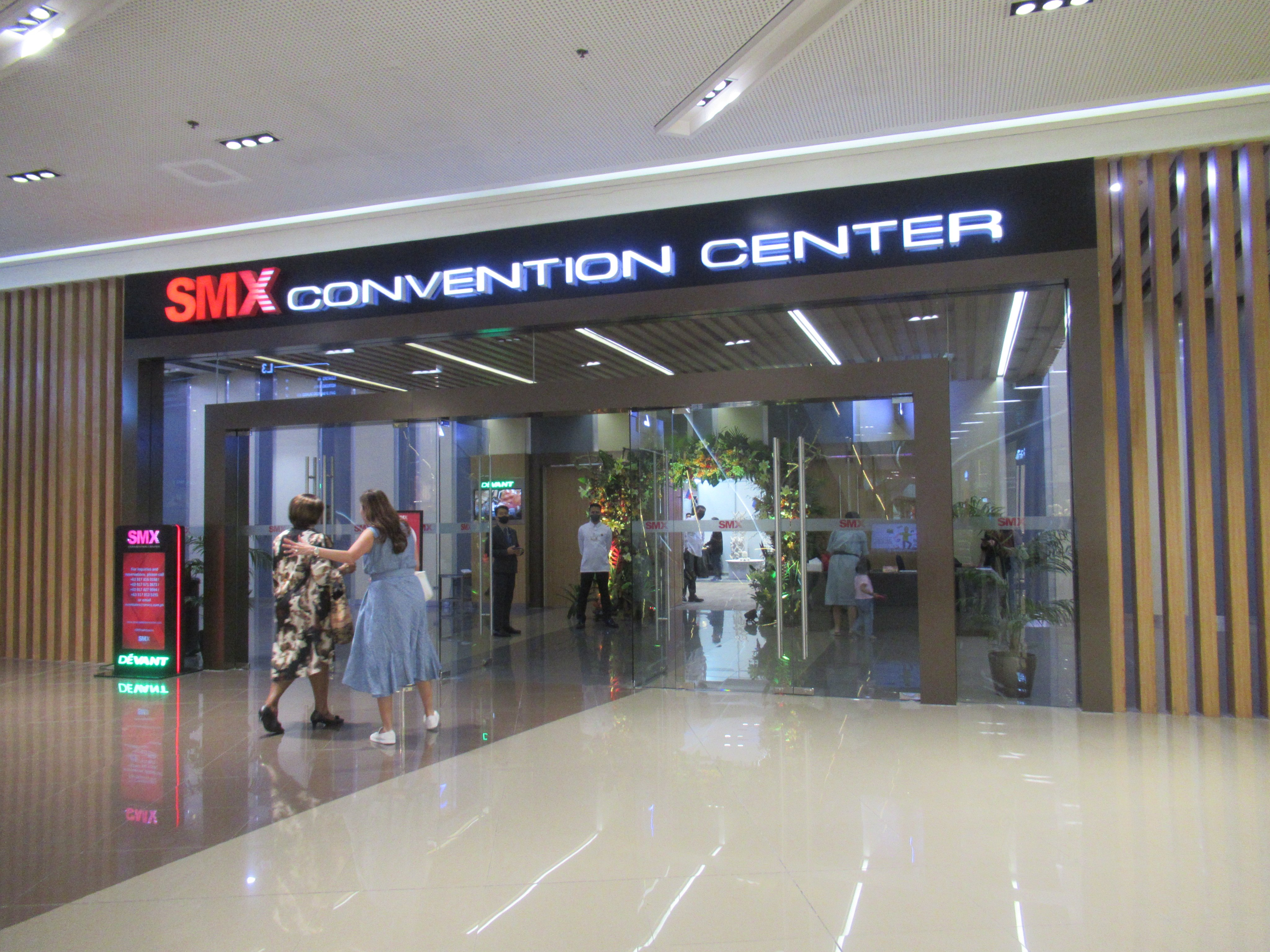
SMX Convention Center Aura

The third branch of SMX Convention Center is located at the third and fourth levels of SM Aura. Occupying 6,148 square meters (66,180 sq ft), it comprises 3 function rooms at the third level and 8 meeting rooms at the fourth level. It has a gross leasable area (GLA) of 3,136 square meters (33,760 sq ft) and a total capacity of up to 2,480.

=== SM Cinema ===
SM Aura offers a total of six state-of-the-art cinemas with two regular cinemas, three Director's Club Cinemas equipped with Dolby Atmos sound system, and an IMAX theater at the fourth level.

==== Director's Club ====
SM Aura offers three Director's Club Cinemas with in-butler service. It is the second Director's Club Cinema branch after SM Mall of Asia. It originally had two cinemas formerly located at the now-occupied renovated regular cinemas.

The Director's Club was closed in May 2023 and relocated at the area of the former regular cinemas and re-opened in December 2023, equipped with Ferco Verona recliner seats and Dolby Atmos surround sound system. A third Director's Club was opened on 2024.

==== IMAX ====
SM Aura offers an IMAX theater that is the seventh of its kind in the country. In January 2022, the IMAX theater temporarily operated as a "Large Screen Format" (with films shown in non-IMAX DMR releases) due to undisclosed reasons. The IMAX theater resumed regular operations with IMAX DMR releases on May 4, 2022, along with the release of Doctor Strange in the Multiverse of Madness.

Following SM Cinema's expanded partnership with IMAX Corporation that will bring IMAX with Laser upgrades to existing IMAX locations, the IMAX was temporarily closed on June 28, 2024, for renovation and upgrade to IMAX with Laser. It re-opened on September 17, 2024, following the red carpet premiere of Transformers One.

==== Event Screen ====
The Event Screen opened on September 17, 2024, at the former IMAX lobby.

=== Samsung Hall ===
Samsung Hall is a 1,000-seat performance theater located at the 6th level of SM Aura. Built through the partnership of SM Group and Samsung Electronics Philippines Corporation, it opened on October 25, 2013. It has a capacity of 1,000 people. It has been graced by multiple international acts such as D'Sound (first performers at the venue), Sungha Jung, Mayday Parade, Charli XCX, Metric, Before You Exit, Oh Wonder, Why Don't We, iKon, Prep, and Anna Akana.

=== Chapel of San Pedro Calungsod ===
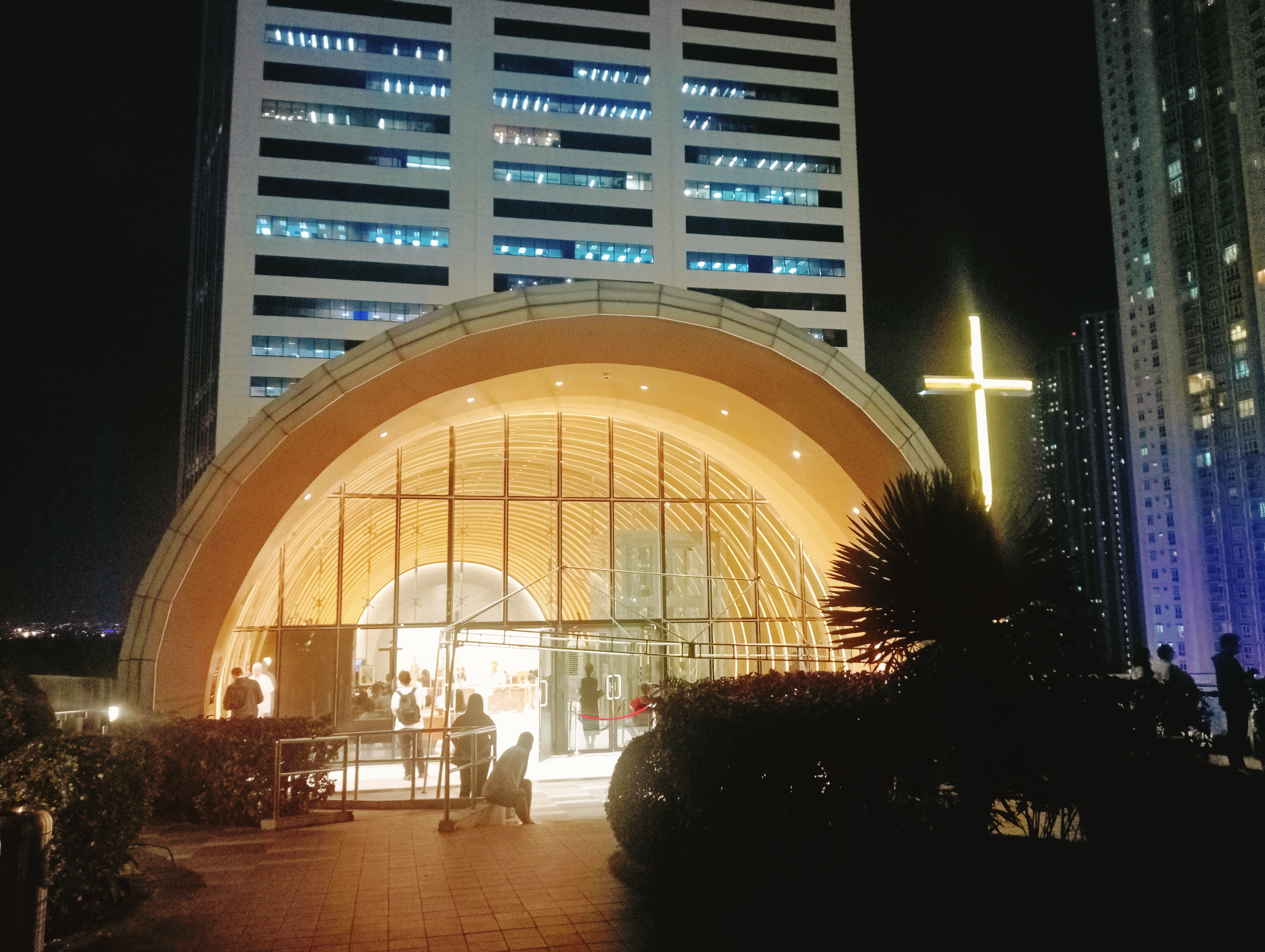
Façade of the Chapel of San Pedro Calungsod

Chapel of San Pedro Calungsod is a 250-seat Roman Catholic chapel located at the 7th level of SM Aura. Opened in May 2013, it is named in honor of the Filipino saint Pedro Calungsod. Shaped like an abstract cave, it has a semi-circular opening that references to the cave of the Resurrection.

=== SM Aura Tower ===
The mall is connected to a 29-story office tower named SM Aura Tower, which has an area of 40,424 square meters (435,120 sq ft) and a GLA of 39,654 square meters (426,830 sq ft). Opened in September 2014, the SM Aura Tower is built according to international green standards, with efficient use of energy and sustainable operation features. The Office Tower is also home to one of the largest serviced offices in the Philippines, with 400 seats in a 20,000-square-meter (220,000 sq ft) office space. As part of Bonifacio Civic Center, the tower also houses several government offices such as Social Security System, PhilHealth, Pag-IBIG Fund (Home Development Mutual Fund), Philippine Postal Corporation, Bureau of Immigration, Land Registration Authority and Taguig City Government, where the Taguig City Council also holds sessions. The tower also houses corporate offices such as Uber, Lixil Philippines, Cisco Systems Management, Inc., Regent Foods Corporation, Teleperformance, and Ezaki Glico International.

SM Aura Tower

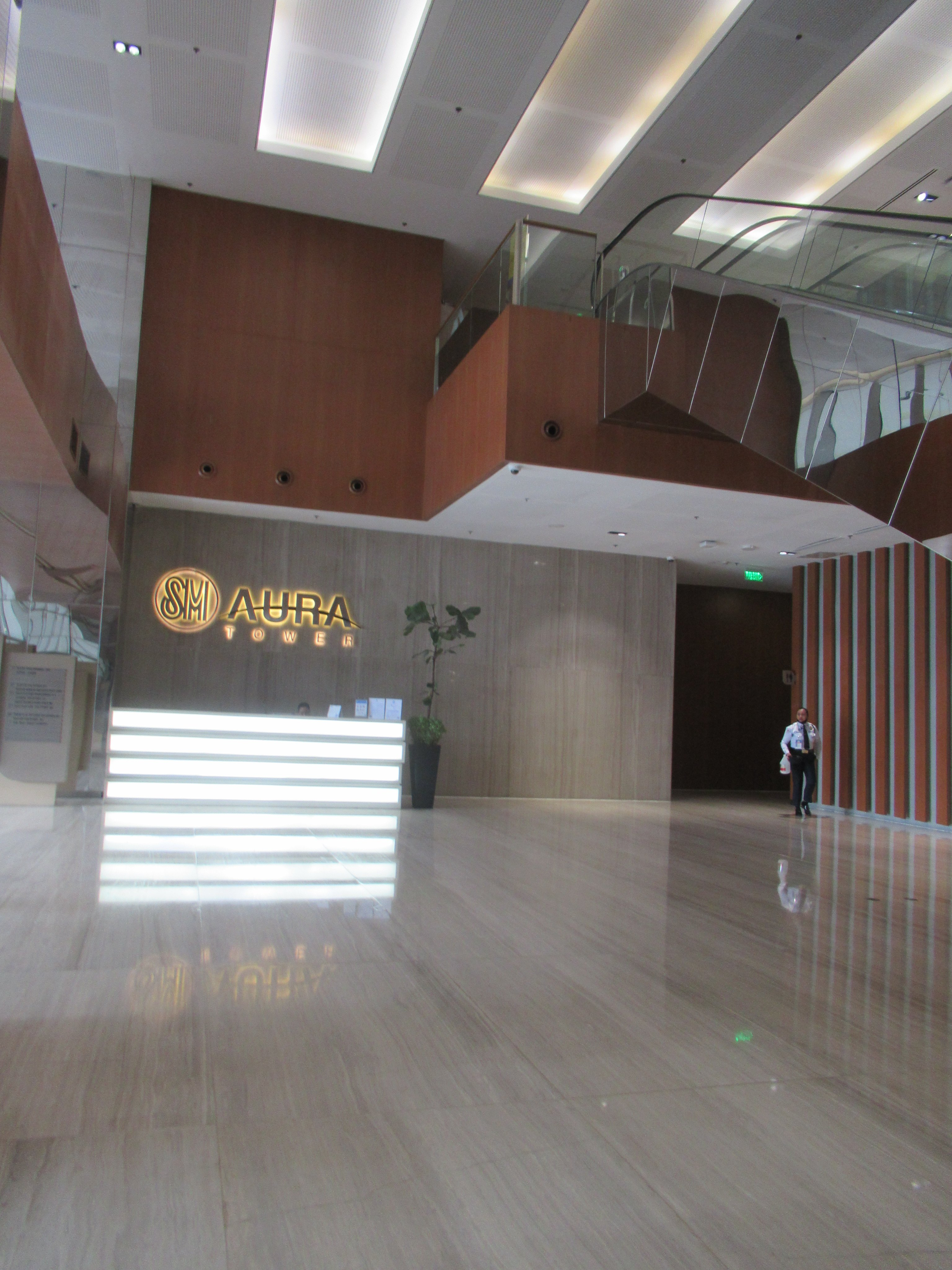
SM Aura Tower lobby

== Awards and recognition ==
SM Aura is also the first and sole mall to be certified Gold under Leadership in Energy and Environmental Design (LEED) for its green features in the retail sector in the Philippines. The LEED Certification is an internationally recognized standard awarded to institutions that follow the strict regulations governing green architecture and construction. It is a citation awarded to a distinct few by the US Green Building Council.

== Incident ==
On June 18, 2013, two window cleaners were injured when the gondola carrying them detached from its cables at the mall. Both were rushed to the nearby St. Luke's Medical Center – Global City.

Preceded by SM Lanang	47th SM Supermall; 2013	Succeeded by SM City BF Parañaque
