= SM City CDO Uptown =

- The façade of the mall in December 2023
- Location: Cagayan de Oro, Philippines
- Coordinates: 8°27′21″N 124°37′24″E
- Address: Fr. Masterson Avenue corner Gran Via Street, Pueblo de Oro Township, Uptown Carmen
- Opened: November 15, 2002; 23 years ago
- Previous names: SM City Cagayan de Oro (2002–2022)
- Developer: SM Prime Holdings
- Owner: SM Prime Holdings
- Num. of stores: 300+
- Num. of anchor tenants: 9 (as of 2012)
- Floor area: 111,837 m^{2} (1,203,800 sq ft)
- Floors: Main Building: 3; Carpark Building: 4; Northwing: 4
- Parking: 2,300 slots
- Website: SM City CDO Uptown

SM City CDO Uptown, formerly known as SM City Cagayan de Oro and also known by the locals as SM Uptown, is a shopping mall located in Carmen, Cagayan de Oro, Philippines. It is owned and operated by SM Prime Holdings and is the first SM Supermall in Northern Mindanao. It opened on November 15, 2002 with a total gross floor area of 111,837 square meters (1,203,800 sq ft) on a 5.2-hectare (13-acre) land.

In June 2022, the mall was renamed to SM City CDO Uptown to distinguish it from SM CDO Downtown, which is also located in the city. It is the first mall to bear the new SM logo.

== Physical details ==
SM City CDO Uptown in 2013

=== Main Mall ===
The main mall, with a gross floor area of 87,837 square meters (945,470 sq ft), features major and minor anchors such as SM Store, SM Supermarket, Cyberzone, SM Appliance Center, Ace Hardware, Our Home, Toy Kingdom, and four SM Cinema. It has service centers, specialty stores and restaurants. It also has indoor and outdoor parking spaces. The mall's exterior facade and interior has similarities to SM City Pampanga and SM City Davao. Some tenants were already moved to the Northwing building to make way for the major renovation and expansion of the main mall building, which is now ongoing. Such changes include: the location swap between SM Store and SM Supermarket, temporary relocation of shops on the east and north side of SM Store to the 2nd floor, construction of 2 new bridges connecting both the Main Mall and North Wing buildings, repainting the main mall to feature a new, sleek design, possible 2nd floor expansion with a new food court, with a new temporary building to manage construction, and modifications to the malls' main entrance.

=== Car park ===
The four-storey car park building was converted to housing apparel stores on its first level and a kart racing track on its roof deck. The stores at the car park had moved to the main mall, except for Bingo Bonanza in which is now Bingo Plus, to pave way for the new Ace Hardware and SM Appliance Center. The old locations are now a part of the SM Store's "Fashion Wing".

=== Northwing ===
The four-storey Northwing with a gross floor area of 24,000 square meters and a gross leasable area of 8,000 square meters is an expansion building of SM City CDO Uptown. The first floor is filled with restaurants and shops, while the second floor includes a "Wellness Zone" to house salons, spas, and optical centers. The building has over 300 parking spaces located on its third and fourth floors.

The Northwing includes dual-sided drive-thru outlets, outdoor dining spaces, and landscaped greenery, providing visitors with an open and accessible shopping environment.

The Northwing opened on June 30, 2022.

=== Main Building Expansion ===
The main building will be expanded to upgrade the mall, starting from the part across the Northwing. Demolition works are in progress to rebuild and replace the original structure.

=== Vail Residences ===
The first SMDC project in Cagayan de Oro and Northern Mindanao as a whole, it is located across SM City CDO Uptown. It is divided into 2 phases. The first one are 14 low-rise 4-storey buildings with studio, studio end, and 1 bedroom units. The 2nd phase is a 10-storey twin-tower project connected in the first 3 floors, with retail spaces on the ground floor.

| Preceded by SM City Davao | 13th SM Supermall; 2002 | Succeeded by SM City Bicutan |
