= SM City General Santos =

Shopping mall in General Santos

- The mall’s facade of SM City General Santos in 2023
- Location: General Santos, South Cotabato, Philippines
- Coordinates: 6°6′58″N 125°10′52″E
- Address: San Miguel Street, Lagao
- Opened: August 10, 2012; 14 years ago
- Developer: SM Prime Holdings
- Owner: SM Prime Holdings
- Architect: JSLA Architects
- Num. of stores: 150+
- Num. of anchor tenants: 6+
- Floor area: 125,245 m^{2} (1,348,130 sq ft)
- Floors: 3 Main Mall, 5 Parking Building
- Parking: 1,500
- Website: SM City General Santos

SM City General Santos is a large shopping mall in General Santos, South Cotabato. It is the 45th shopping mall by SM Prime Holdings, the Philippines' largest shopping mall and retail operator. Making it the largest mall in Soccsksargen. It has a gross floor area of 125,245 square meters (1,348,130 sq ft).

It opened to the public on August 10, 2012.

== History ==
=== Planning ===
It was reported in 2008 that SM Prime Holdings, the Philippines' largest shopping mall and retail operator, was interested in developing a shopping mall in General Santos. Rival developer Robinsons Land had started construction on a ₱1 trillion (US$75.2 billion) shopping mall set to open in 2009, challenging long-established malls Gaisano and KCC Mall.

=== Construction ===
In September 2011, four construction workers working on the mall were injured when a portion of the third floor collapsed as the workers were pouring wet cement. The floor crashed down to the second floor, pinning the workers below. The workers were confined in a local hospital for treatment.

Another construction accident occurred in December 2011, when a platform collapsed as construction workers were installing insulators on the ceiling of the third floor. The workers, who were not wearing safety belts, fell to the concrete floor, resulting in seven workers sustaining varying degrees of injury. The victims were employees of Irvine Construction, one of the construction firms hired by SM Prime Holdings to build the mall.

=== Opening ===
SM City General Santos opened on August 10, 2012. At the time of its opening, it was 80% occupied.

== Mall Features ==
The mall features a wide range of facilities and a spacious layout. It houses numerous retail stores and dining establishments, anchored by The SM Store and an SM Supermarket, along with a Food Court and other international and local dining options.

For entertainment, it boasts 4 cinemas under SM Cinema, and a Cyberzone for gadgets and technology. The mall's architectural features include the Fountain Court, an al fresco area with a dancing fountain and restaurants for customers to enjoy meals outdoors, and a large oval atrium, which is a central event space for promotional activities and shows. The complex also includes a five-level carpark building.

A unique feature of the mall is the Trade Hall, located on the 3rd Level, which serves as a venue for various events, exhibits, and trade fairs. The Trade Hall has a total floor area of 3,131 square meters. It can be converted into two exhibit halls, each approximately 1,300 square meters. Additionally, the facility includes two meeting rooms: Meeting Room 1 is around 116 square meters, and Meeting Room 2 is about 195 square meters.

Other notable facilities includes The Medical City Clinic on the second floor.

== Incidents ==
- In 2019, the mall was slightly damaged outside and the ceiling collapse following a magnitude 6.2 earthquake.
- On November 17, 2023, the mall was once again partially damaged by an earthquake and the mall's ceiling collapsed, causing the mall to be temporarily closed for a few days.
- On June 8, 2026, the mall again sustained heavy damage due to a magnitude 7.8 earthquake, causing the mall to be closed temporarily pending further assessments.

| Preceded by SM City San Fernando Downtown | 45th SM Supermall; 2012 | Succeeded by SM Lanang |
