= SM City Davao =

- The facade of SM City Davao in September 2023
- Location: Davao City, Philippines
- Coordinates: 7°2′57″N 125°35′18″E
- Address: Quimpo Blvd. corner Eco West Drive, Matina
- Opened: Main mall: November 17, 2001; 24 years ago The Annex: March 9, 2012; 14 years ago Expansion Wing: July 29, 2025; 15 months ago
- Developer: SM Prime Holdings
- Manager: SM Prime Holdings
- Num. of stores: 700+
- Floor area: 120,000 m^{2} (1,300,000 sq ft)
- Floors: Main Mall: 3; The Annex: 4; Expansion 1: 8; BPO + Carpark Building: 4
- Public transit: Mintal-Roxas Ave. Tugbok-Roxas Ave. Calinan-Roxas Ave.; Toril-Roxas Ave.; Toril-Bankerohan; Panacan-SM City; Ecoland-SM City; Bangkal-Magsaysay Ave. Puan-Magsaysay Ave. Bago Aplaya-Roxas Ave.; Future: M2 SM City Davao
- Website: SM City Davao

SM City Davao, also known locally as SM Ecoland, is an indoor shopping mall in Quimpo Boulevard, Matina, Davao City, Philippines. SM Prime Holdings developed and manages the mall. It is the first SM Mall in Mindanao, opening to the public on November 17, 2001. As of 2026 it has a gross floor area (GFA) of approximately 120,000 square meters

== Location ==
SM City Davao's 2nd logo from 2010 to 2022.

SM City Davao in 2008

SM City Davao is built on 13.2 hectares (33 acres) of land. The mall is at Quimpo Boulevard. A transportation terminal constructed beside the mall accommodates visitors (demolished to make way for the expansion building).

The mall's exterior facade and interior have similarities to SM City Pampanga and SM City CDO Uptown.

== Physical details ==
=== Main Mall ===
The Main Mall is a 3-level square-shaped building with anchor tenants The SM Store and SM Supermarket It also features six digital cinemas. Main Building of the mall has a total gross floor area of 70,000 square metres (750,000 ft^{2}). It has many local and international store brands along with the old Entertainment Center, and the former Cyberzone. A passport office of the Department of Foreign Affairs occupies the 3,400 square metres (37,000 ft^{2}) of space at the mall's third level which opened in September 2012.

=== The Annex ===
The Annex is an expansion building of SM City Davao. This 20,000 square metres (220,000 ft^{2}) building has hundreds of tenants. It has shops on its 1st and 2nd floors, while business process outsourcing facilities are on its 3rd and 4th floors.

=== 2023 Expansion Building ===
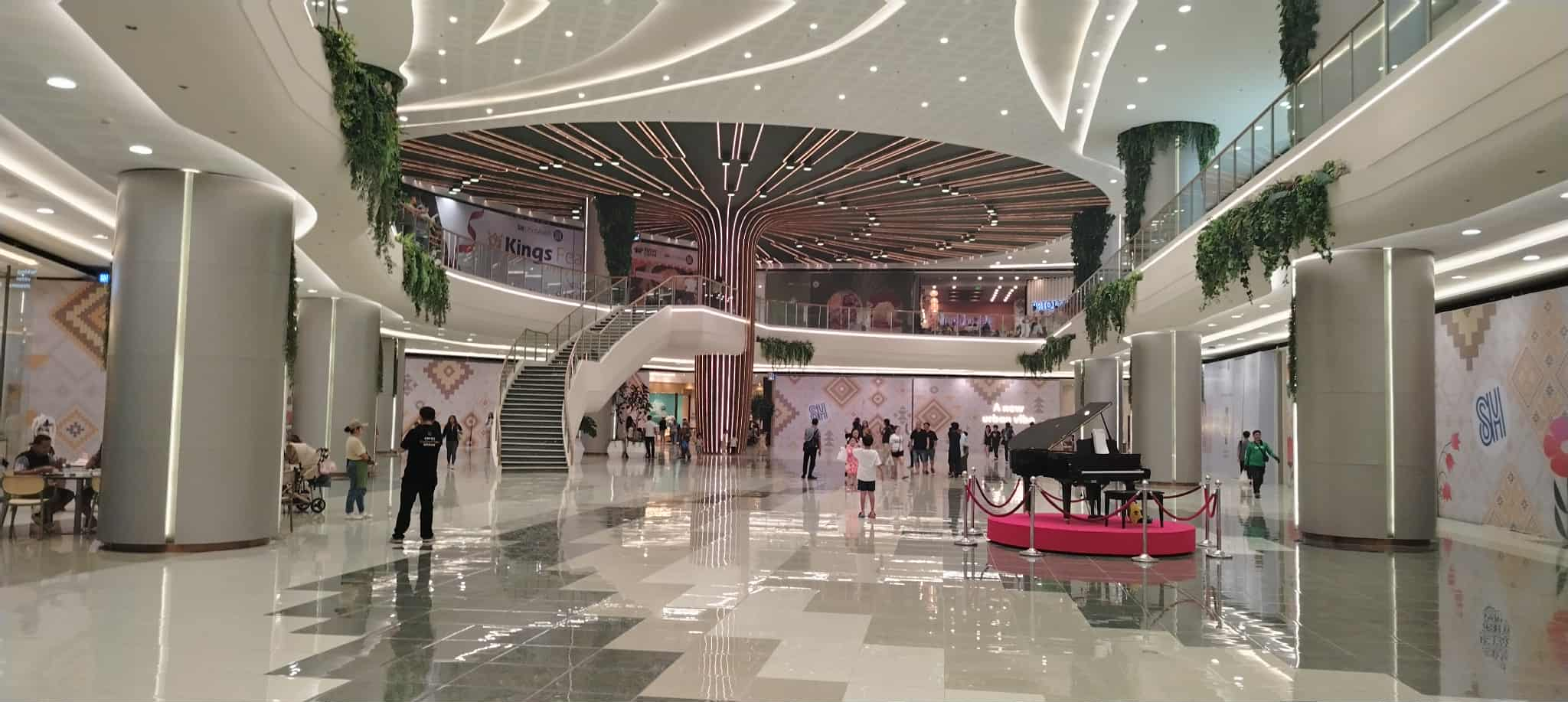
The interior of SM City Davao's 2023 expansion building in September 2025.

in the first quarter of 2023, works began for the expansion building on the left side of the mall which was once a parking lot and a transport terminal. It had an allotted budget of Php 2,389,016,973, with a proposed area of more than 30,000m². bringing the entire mall's gross floor area to square meters of 120,000m² when completed in 2nd quarter of 2025.

The expansion is composed of 3 levels of commercial space, 5 levels for parking, and 2 levels for the first Mindanao branch of National University. Included in the project was a 4-level parking building with EM (two levels with mall provision and 2 levels with EMB).

The new expansion wing had its soft opening on July 29, 2025.

== Incidents ==
=== Annex Construction collapse incident ===
Five construction workers were removing the scaffolding of the cemented steel canopy when the canopy collapsed due to metal fatigue. The victims were Prudencio Custorio, Alvin Rapista, Ronie Mosqueda, Rogelio Piodo, and Ruel Inampas. They suffered bruises and wounds, and the rescue team brought them to the Southern Philippines Medical Center. Mayor Sara Duterte ordered construction stopped during the investigation. The reason of the collapsed canopy was due to an error in construction method, according to Engineer Jaime Adalin, the chief of Davao City Building Office.

=== 2013 Davao City bombings ===
The mall was subjected to one of the two terrorist bombings that occurred on September 17, 2013, the other one being at Gaisano Mall of Davao after the blast site. It happened during the time of armed crisis in Zamboanga City, which involved elements of the Moro National Liberation Front (MNLF); however, the MNLF Davao Regional Command denied that they were behind the bombings. The incident happened at the Cinema 1.

=== 2019 earthquake ===
After the 2019 Davao del Sur earthquake, the mall building incurred damage, particularly at the top of Annex Building and the ceilings outside the mall collapsed. No deaths and injuries were reported.

Preceded by SM City Sucat	12th SM Supermall; 2001	Succeeded by SM City CDO Uptown
