= Davao Public Transport Modernization Project =

Bus route network in the Philippines

Davao Bus Project
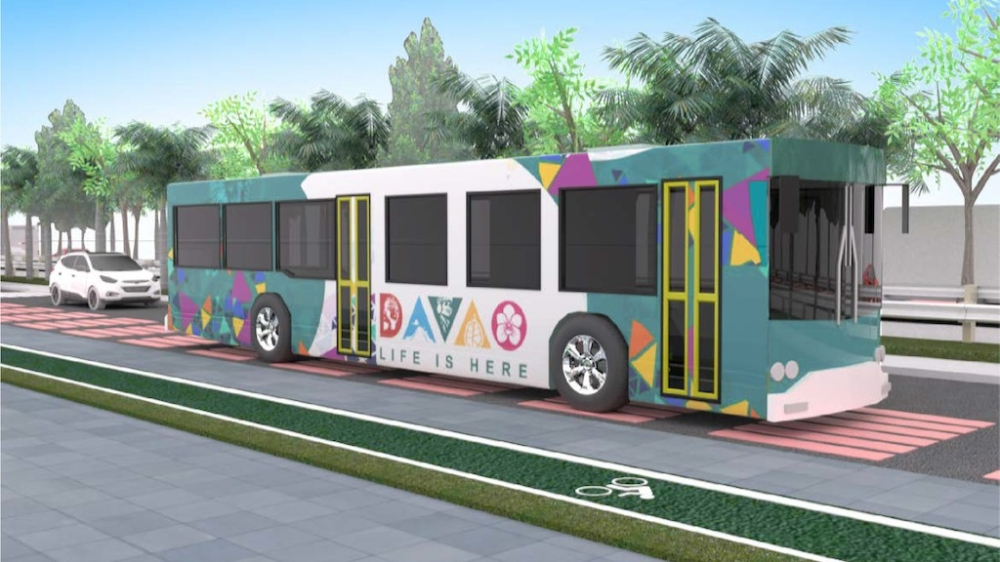

Overview
- Owner: Department of Transportation (DOTr)
- Area served: Davao City and Panabo City, Philippines
- Transit type: Bus rapid transit
- Number of lines: 31
- Number of stations: 1,074
- Daily ridership: ~800,000
- Chief executive: Tristan Dwight Domingo (City Government of Davao) & Nestor Kilian Tabada (DOTr)

Operation
- Operation will start: 2026 (partial)
- Number of vehicles: 380 electric and 720 Euro-V compliant diesel

Technical
- System length: 672 km (418 mi)

The Davao Public Transport Modernization Project (DPTMP) or simply the Davao Bus Project and formerly known as the High Priority Bus System (HPBS), is a 672-kilometer bus route network under construction in Davao City, Philippines. This project is part of the Public Transport Modernization Program of the Department of Transportation (DOTr).

== Background ==
To address worsening urban transport problems, the Government of the Philippines has developed its National Environmentally Sustainable Transport Strategy, which includes Davao as one of the focus cities. Extensive consultation has occurred between the government and the Asian Development Bank (ADB) under the ADB-supported Promoting Sustainable Urban Transport in Asia Project, which included Davao as one of the three case study cities.

The study of Davao, completed in July 2011, recommended addressing the urgent requirement to modernize the city’s public transport system and operations. In line with this recommendation, ADB fielded a reconnaissance mission to Davao on 12–13 July 2012 to discuss with government officials urban transport issues and reach agreement on the impact, outcome, outputs, implementation arrangements, cost, financing arrangements, and terms of reference of policy and advisory technical assistance (TA) for the Davao Sustainable Urban Transport Project. The TA is included in ADB’s 2012–2014 country operations business plan for the Philippines.

On August 10, 2015, a Project Preparatory Technical Assistance (PPTA) was approved for the HPBS project and became effective on February 15, 2016. Later that year, the project enlisted GHD Pty. Ltd. to undertake the consulting services for the PPTA.

Coordination between the ADB and the City Government of Davao progressed in 2017 during the term of former mayor Sara Duterte. In 2018, GHD Pty. developed the first iteration of the Social Development Program (SDP) report, which subsequently led to the approval of the HPBS project by the National Economic Department Authority (NEDA) Board within that year.

Also in 2018, ADB reported that the High Priority Bus Project (HPBS) project for this city is already on the design stage and they are closely working with the city government. The project's target implementation date was moved. The estimated cost of the project was also estimated to be at ₱3.6 billion courtesy of the loan from ADB, and had only 5 routes in total. By then, the project also coincided with the Public Utility Vehicle Modernization Program (PUVMP) of the Philippines under president Rodrigo Duterte.

Implementation of the HPBS was expected to begin in 2019 with the funding of ADB through an Official Development Assistance agreement. But it was delayed due to the late approval of the project by the NEDA in that year.

In 2019, the local city government allocated ₱100 million for the preliminary implementation of HPBS. It was counterpart of the said loan from the ADB. The target year of implementation of the project was set by 2022. With the approval of the National Economic and Development Authority on the project, the budget was expanded to ₱18.6 billion, with 29 routes throughout the city and is divided into 4 tiers.

In 2020, the project was formally known as the "Davao Public Transport Modernization Project". But with the outbreak of COVID-19, the implementation of the project was uncertain and put on hold due to lockdowns and resources being diverted to curb the effect of the pandemic. In 2021, the project's full operation date was again moved to the 3rd quarter of 2023. An Interim Bus System was launched in preparation to the project with routes to Toril and Catalunan Grande.

In 2023, NEDA granted the secondary approval of the DPTMP and approved the expansion of the project which saw the budget of the project increase to almost ₱73 billion. The expected contribution of the local government increased to ₱1.5 billion throughout the whole project implementation. The formal contract signing of the loan agreement happened in July with ADB officials and the Philippine Government led by president Bongbong Marcos.

In 2024, contracts for the civil works of the project which includes bus stops, bus lanes, depots, and terminals of the projects were signed. However, the project has been hounded with postponements caused by right of way issues concerning 32 landowners.

In 2025, DOTr Secretary Vince Dizon’s inspected the project’s Bus Driving Academy site in Calinan District, in line with the President’s directives to fast track the highly anticipated project. The DavaoBus Driving Academy will be the first of its kind in the Philippines. It aims to professionalize public transport driving, ensuring safer roads for both commuters and motorists. In August 22, he also confirmed that approximately 60% of the necessary ROW has been secured since the groundwork began in March, with efforts underway to finalize the remaining 40% within the year. The DavaoBus is set to start its pilot operations in 2027 with full implementation to start in 2028.

== Routes ==
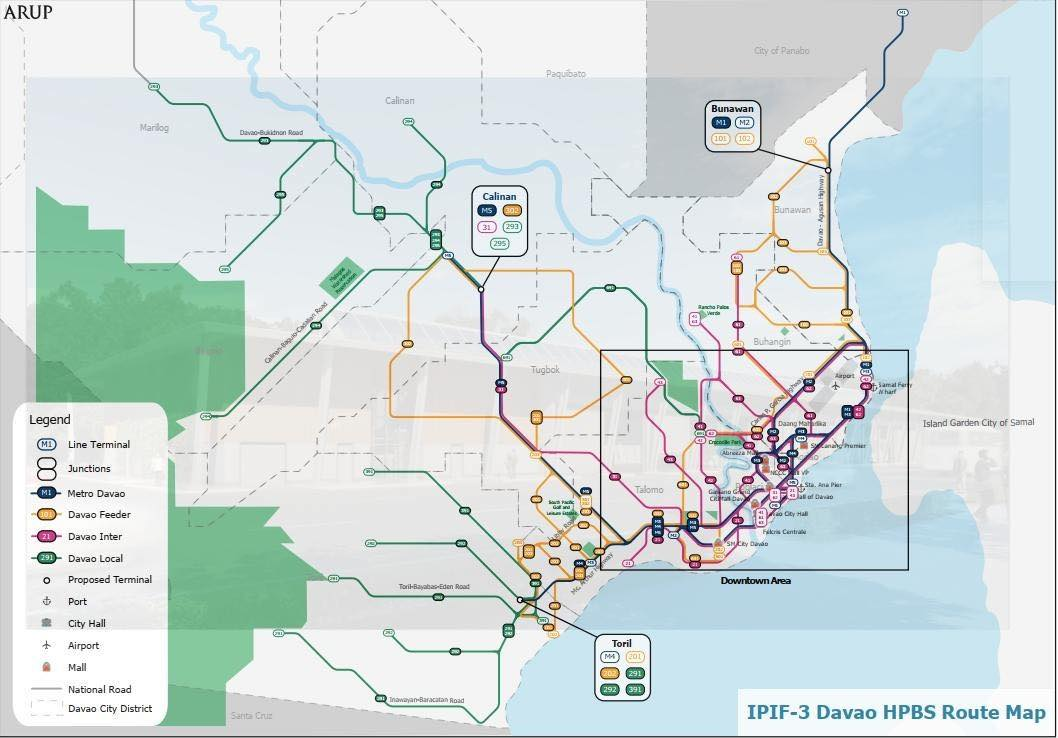
Routes of Davao Bus Project. Posted by former DOTr Secretary Art Tugade.

The HPBS will have a 4-tier system with 12 interchange locations.

=== Metro Davao ===
Metro Davao
Route	Origin and Destination (vice versa)	Notes
M1	Panabo City ↔ Roxas Avenue	
M2	Matina Aplaya ↔ Bunawan	
M3	Bago Aplaya ↔ Sasa Port	
M4	Toril ↔ SM Lanang	
M5	Calinan ↔ Sta. Ana Avenue	

=== Davao Inter ===
Route	Origin and Destination (vice versa)	Notes
21	Talomo Proper ↔ Sta. Ana Avenue	
31	Calinan ↔ Roxas Avenue	
41	Mandug ↔ Davao City Hall	
42	Maa ↔ Sasa	
43	Langub ↔ Magsaysay Park	
61	Acacia ↔ Davao City Hall	
62	Buhangin Proper ↔ Roxas Avenue	
63	Mandug ↔ Davao City Hall	

=== Davao Feeder ===
Route	Origin and Destination (vice versa)	Notes
101	San Isidro ↔ Francisco Bangoy International Airport	
102	Bunawan ↔ Terminal Sasa Port	
103	Tibungco ↔ Panacan	
201	Toril Terminal ↔ Mintal	
202	Toril Fish Port ↔ Ecoland Drive	
203	Bangkal ↔ Mintal	
301	Mintal ↔ Calinan	
302	Calinan Terminal ↔ Mintal	
601	Cabantian ↔ Matina Aplaya	

=== Davao Local ===
Route	Origin and Destination (vice versa)	Notes
291	Baracatan ↔ Eden	
292	Catigan ↔ Tagurano	
293	Lumondao ↔ Calinan	
294	Carmen ↔ Inayangan	
295	Tambobong ↔ Calinan	
391	Daliaon Plantation ↔ Toril Fish Port	
691	Tugbok Davao ↔ MRP Station	

== Funding and planning ==
The whole project will have an estimated cost of ₱73.37 Billion.

== Project contract packages ==
The planned construction is divided into eleven Contract Packages (CP). The Department of Transportation (DOTr) awarded three contracts to China International Water & Electrical Corporation. CP01 is for designing and building Buhangin and Calinan Depot, and for a driving school. CP02 is for Toril Depot and Terminal, and Bunawan and Calinan Terminals. CP03 is for roadworks and pedestrian infrastructure such as bus stops and bus lanes. The CP04 was awarded to the joint-venture of China Wu Yi, Fujian Construction and Engineering, and Vicente Lao Construction, which is the contract for Sasa and Sto. Niño Depot.

Contract Packages 5 up to 8 are still on the bidding processes. CP05 deals with the supply and maintenance services for the diesel bus fleet, meanwhile CP06 is for the electric bus fleet. CP07 is for the Intelligent Transport Systems (ITS). The last package, CP08 is for setting up the Automatic Fare Collection Systems (AFCS).

The rest of the CP are for consultancy services. CP09 is for the General Consultant, CP10 is for Systems Administration Consultant, CP11 is for Evaluation and Monitoring Consultants for Resettlement and the Social Development Program.

== Issues and criticisms ==
For its implementation, various infrastructure must be built such as bus depots and terminal. Several Indigenous People's communities are expected to be affected by the said constructions. It includes IP tribes in the Districts of Baguio, Calinan, Marilog, and Toril in Davao City.

Various transport groups in the city such as PISTON-Southern Mindanao expressed their opposition to the project, citing that it will kill the livelihood of all jeepney drivers in the city. They raised concern on the challenges the project may impose for small operators and drivers in the city.

Despite the Public Utility Vehicle Modernization Program which imposed consolidation among individual jeepney operators, Davao City is exempted from such consolidation due to DPTMP taking place. Making it the only city in the country to be exempted drew flak from various transport cooperatives nationwide.

== DC Bus (Davao City Interim Bus Service) ==
In 2021, an Interim Bus System was launched in preparation to the project with routes to Toril and Catalunan Grande.

In 2025, the City Government of Davao purchased 10 units of Yutong ZK6126HG to serve the DC Bus service. These are low-entry buses have features such as GPS, CCTVs, TV screen, and bicycle racks. Each unit costs ₱9.9 million, funded through the City's Supplemental Budget No. 3, FY 2024.

An additional 20 low-floor electric bus is set for procurement, and is expected to arrive by December 2026. Upon their arrival, there will be 30 units that will be serving the Interim Bus Service.

=== Routes ===
The Davao City Interim Bus Service (DIBS) commenced operations on 5 December 2025.

DC Bus
Route	Origin and Destination (vice versa)	Notes
R102	Toril ↔ GE Torres (Sandawa)	
R103	Toril ↔ Roxas	
R402	Mintal ↔ GE Torres (Sandawa)	
R403	Mintal ↔ Roxas	
R503	Bangkal ↔ Roxas	
R603	Buhangin ↔ Roxas	
R763	Panacan (via Buhangin) ↔ Roxas	
R783	Panacan (via Angliongto) ↔ Roxas	
R793	Panacan (via R. Castillo) ↔ Roxas	
