= SM Prime =

Property developer and a subsidiary of SM Investments Corporation

SM Prime Holdings, Inc.

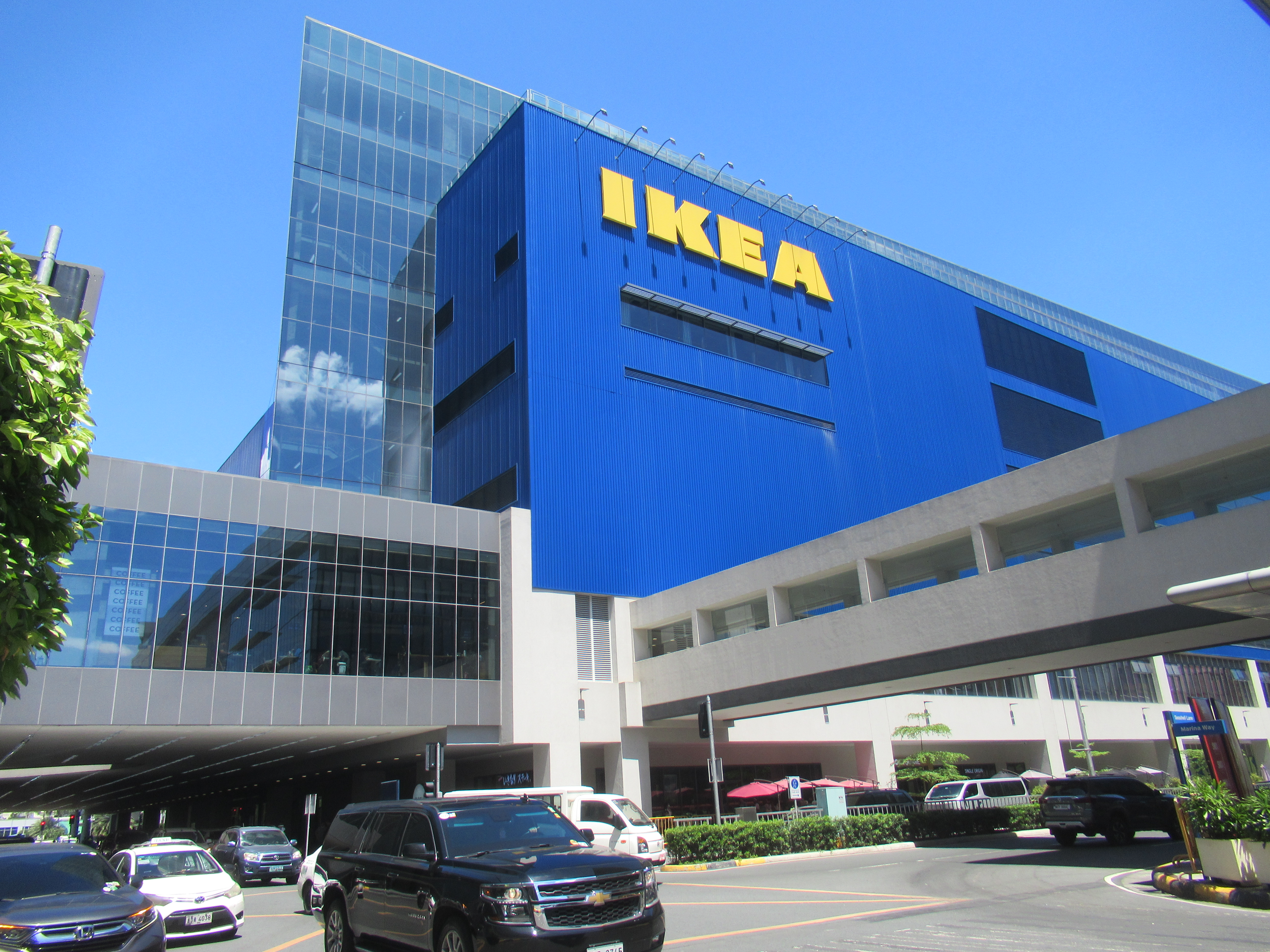
- MOA Square, site of the headquarters of SM Prime Holdings
- Type: Public
- Traded as: PSE: SMPH
- Industry: Property, shopping malls and retailing
- Founded: February 6, 1958; 68 years ago in Manila, Philippines
- Founder: Henry Sy Sr.
- Headquarters: 7th Floor, MOA Square, Seashell Lane corner Coral Way, SM Mall of Asia Complex, Pasay City, Metro Manila, Philippines
- Number of locations: 88 malls 2,303 stores nationwide 48 SM Supermarkets, 44 SM Hypermarkets, 156 Savemore stores, 39 Walter Mart stores, 210 Alfamart stores, and 1,749 specialty stores
- Area served: Philippines; China; Guam
- Key people: Henry Sy Jr. (Chairman); Amando Tetangco Jr. (Vice Chairman); Jeffrey C. Lim (President)
- Revenue: ▲ ₱142.62 billion (2024)
- Operating income: ▲ ₱56.84 billion (2024)
- Net income: ▲ ₱45.63 billion (2024)
- Parent: SM Investments (49.70%)
- Website: www.smprime.com

SM Prime Holdings, Inc. (SMPH) is a Filipino integrated property developer and a public subsidiary of SM Investments Corporation. It was incorporated on January 6, 1994, to develop, conduct, operate, and maintain the SM commercial shopping centers and all businesses related thereto, such as the lease of commercial spaces within the compound of shopping centers. It went public on July 5, 1994, and subsequently grew to become the largest company listed on the Philippine Stock Exchange in terms of revenue. The company's main sources of revenues primarily include rental income from mall and food courts, as well as from cinema ticket sales and amusement income.

== History ==
The roots of SM date back to the 1950s when entrepreneur Henry Sy, Sr. established a shoe store at Carriedo Street in Quiapo, Manila. His store was established as ShoeMart, which was originally located at Carlos Palanca Sr. Street. His aggressive and adamant strategy helped him gain large profits within a few years and he later expanded his business to become a fully functioning department store named ShoeMart, which specializes in the sale of shoes, the sector of which the store originally was. ShoeMart soon became known by its abbreviation, SM, in Manila. The abbreviation SM has become an orphan initialism. The first ShoeMart outlet was abandoned and the department store moved to a new site along the nearby Carriedo Street. The old site was demolished in 1982 and was turned into its Clearance Outlet. In 1979, ShoeMart made its first expansion outside Metro Manila with the opening of SM Iloilo.

The first SM Mall, the SM North EDSA, was opened in 1985. Followed by the establishment of a second mall, the SM Centerpoint, in 1990. Since then, the company has expanded by establishing malls nationwide.

SM Prime logo (2010–2022)

On May 17, 2013, SM opened the SM Aura Premier. The same year, the company announced a merger with SM Land, which owns SM Development and Commercial Properties Group. As a result, upon approval by Securities and Exchange Commission, SM Prime is one of the largest property companies in the Southeast Asia region, competing with Gokongwei-led Robinsons Land (which owns Robinsons Malls) and Tan-led Megaworld Corporation.

== Subsidiaries ==
=== SM Supermalls ===
SM Supermalls is a chain of shopping malls with a total of 98 malls, 89 of which are in the Philippines, and 9 in China as of January 2026. According to the company, the malls attract an average foot traffic of 3.5 million daily and has over 5,000 tenant partners.

=== SM Offices ===
SM Offices is SM Prime's commercial development arm responsible for the development various commercial properties and office tower developments across the country. Their key office properties include the E-Com Center towers at the SM Mall of Asia Complex, the Mega Tower located beside SM Megamall, the North Towers at the SM North EDSA Complex, the SM Fairview Towers at the SM City Fairview Complex, and the SM Aura Tower at the SM Aura complex.

=== SM Development Corporation (SMDC) ===
SM Development Corporation (SMDC) is a wholly owned subsidiary and the real estate arm of SMPH. Its properties are strategically situated in key areas across Metro Manila specifically the Central Business Districts of Mall of Asia Complex, Makati, Ortigas, Taguig, Quezon City, Manila, Pasay, Parañaque and Las Piñas, as well as nearby provinces like Cavite, Bulacan, Pampanga and in Visayan locations Iloilo, Cebu City and Bacolod.

Back in 2020, SMDC bagged the most-coveted Best Developer of the Year award in the annual PropertyGuru Asia Property Awards alongside other recognitions:

SM Development Corporation 8th PropertyGuru Asia Property Awards Recognitions
Best Developer	Winner	SMDC
Best Lifestyle Developer	Winner	SMDC
Special Recognition in CSR	Winner	SMDC
Best Condo Development (Luzon)	Winner	Park Residences
Best Mid-End Condo Development (Metro Manila)	Winner	Charm Residences
Best Condo Architectural Design	Winner	Sail Residences
Best Landscape Architectural Design	Winner	Sail Residences
Best Lifestyle Development	Winner	Fern at Grass Residences
Best Affordable Condo Development (Metro Manila)	Highly Commended	Bloom Residences
Best Affordable Condo Development (Metro Manila)	Highly Commended	Vine Residences
Best Affordable Condo Development (Metro Manila)	Highly Commended	Fern at Grass Residences
Best Affordable Condo Development (Metro Manila)	Highly Commended	Field Residences Building 5 and 6
Best Condo Architectural Design	Highly Commended	S Residences
Best Condo Development (Luzon)	Highly Commended	Hope Residences
Best Condo Development (Luzon)	Highly Commended	Green 2 Residences
Best Condo Development (Visayas)	Highly Commended	Style Residences
Best Condo Development (Visayas)	Highly Commended	Smile Residences
Best Condo Interior Design	Highly Commended	S Residences
Best Condo Interior Design	Highly Commended	Sail Residences
Best Condo Interior Design	Highly Commended	Shore 3 Residences
Best High-End Condo Development (Metro Manila)	Highly Commended	S Residences
Best Landscape Architectural Design	Highly Commended	S Residences
Best Lifestyle Development	Highly Commended	Sail Residences
Best Lifestyle Development	Highly Commended	S Residences
Best Mid-End Condo Development (Metro Manila)	Highly Commended	Leaf Residences

== See also ==
- SM Supermalls
- SM Store
- List of shopping malls in the Philippines
- List of largest shopping malls in the Philippines
