= Sy siblings =

Filipino business family

- Born: Teresita, Elizabeth, Henry Jr., Hans, Herbert, and Harley; October 1950–1959 (ages 67–75)
- Education: Assumption College (Teresita); Maryknoll College (Elizabeth); De La Salle University (Sy brothers)
- Occupation: Businesspeople
- Years active: 1970s–present
- Known for: Richest people in the Philippines (2019–2024) as per Forbes by net worth; executives of the SM Group
- Parents: Henry Sy (father); Felicidad Tan (mother)

The Sy siblings are a group of six Filipino-Chinese businesspeople who are children of Henry Sy Sr. and Felicidad Tan. Recognized as belonging to the richest family in the Philippines, they as collective have often been noted by Forbes magazine to be the richest in terms of net worth since Henry Sy Sr's death in 2019 until 2024. Each of the six siblings are U.S. dollar billionaires in their own right as of 2025 and are among the 15 wealthiest Filipino individuals, according to Forbes.

== Early lives ==
The Sy siblings are children of Henry Sy Sr. and Felicidad Tan. Henry Sr., a migrant from Fukien, China (now Fujian, P.R. China) is known for his role in developing the SM Supermalls brand from a shoe store which opened in Carriedo, Manila in 1958. The siblings were born within the first nine years of marriage of Herny Sy and Felicia Tan – Teresita (1950), Elizabeth (1952), Henry Jr. (1953), Hans (1955), Herbert (1956), and Harley (1959).

Henry Sr. starts training the Sy siblings in the family business when they reach 13-years old. They are often given tours in SM stores during the weekends and are given menial tasks. Hans Sy recalled working as a trash can cleaner, cash clerk and sales clerk within the family business.

Teresita attended the Assumption College while her younger sister Elizabeth graduated from Maryknoll College (now Miriam College). All four brothers attended the De La Salle University.

== Members ==
All six siblings grew up to be businesspeople who have executive roles within their family's SM Group.

=== Teresita Sy ===
Teresita Sy-Coson (born October 1950) is the eldest among six siblings. At 22-years old, she was entrusted to by his father to help open the first branch of SM Department Store two months into the Martial law era under president Ferdinand Marcos. Sy-Coson is the chairperson of Banco de Oro (BDO) and oversaw the bank's merger with Equitable PCI Bank which was initiated in 2004. She was married to lumber businessman Louis Coson who died in 2003.

=== Elizabeth Sy ===
Elizabeth Sy (born 1952) is the president of SM Hotels and Conventions Corp. (SMHCC), the arm of the SM Group which manages hotels and convention centers established in 2008.

=== Henry Sy Jr. ===
Henry "Bigboy" Sy Jr. (born 1953) became the director of SM Prime in 1994 and later its board chairman in 2014.

Sy Jr. was the third president and CEO for eight years from June 20, 2010 to March 7, 2018 of the National Grid Corporation of the Philippines (NGCP), a privately-owned transmission company which operates and maintains, and owns the Philippine power grid components both entirely new and secondhand that abandoned their pre-concession period or start date original designation or usage and Philippine government ownership (National Power Corporation (NAPOCOR/NPC) and National Transmission Corporation (TransCo)-era) and their exact lands or locations, and rights of ways or power line portions acquired and designated from its turnover from TransCo under the national government's Department of Energy on January 15, 2009 that marked TransCo's privatization in grid operations, maintenance, construction, expansion, and eminent domain. An exception to NGCP's ownership to the grid are portions with acquisition and designation made until the said date of January 2009 by its predecessors NAPOCOR/NPC (November 3, 1936–March 1, 2003) and TransCo itself (March 2003–January 15, 2009) as they are still owned by TransCo with NGCP only granted O&M and construction rights for them as such the only remaining part of TransCo that was not privatized.

He is also the founder of the Big Boss Cement which he set up in 2017. Big Boss' products are based on pozzolanic sand rather than limestone-derived clinker.

Sy Jr. is a member of the Christ's Commission Fellowship.

=== Hans Sy ===
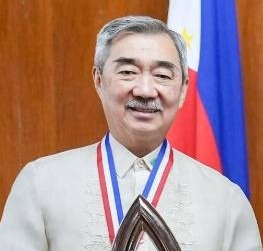
Hans Sy in 2023

Hans Sy (born 1955) is the fourth eldest. He is the chairman of SM Prime. He has been director of the company since 1994. Hans was also president of SM Prime until 2016.

He was entrusted by Henry Sr. that oversaw the construction of The SM Center North EDSA (now SM North EDSA) which opened in 1985.

Sy is also chairman of China Bank and the National University.

=== Herbert Sy ===
Herbert Sy (born 1956) is the second youngest son among the siblings. He is the director of SM Prime.

=== Harley Sy ===
Harley Sy (born 1959) is the youngest among the siblings and fourth son of Henry Sy. He is the executive director of SM Investments and director of China Bank.

== Wealth ==
The Sy siblings are grouped as one entry by Forbes in wealth rankings. In 2024, they collectively are the top entry in Forbes Asia's 'Philippines' 50 Richest' list with the net worth of $11.1 billion as of 2024. They were first recognized as the richest in the Philippines in 2019 following their father's death with a collective net worth of $17.2 billion.

In the 2025 Forbes’ Billionaires, however, the Sy siblings were listed separately – Henry Sy Jr. ($2.3-billion), Hans Sy ($2.2-billion), Herbert Sy ($2.1-billion), Harley Sy ($1.9-billion), Teresita Sy-Coson ($1.9-billion) and Elizabeth Sy ($1.7-billion). They ranked sixth to eleventh richest in the Philippines. Manny Villar is the top Filipino entry at $17.2-billion.
