= SM Quiapo =

Department store in Manila, Philippines

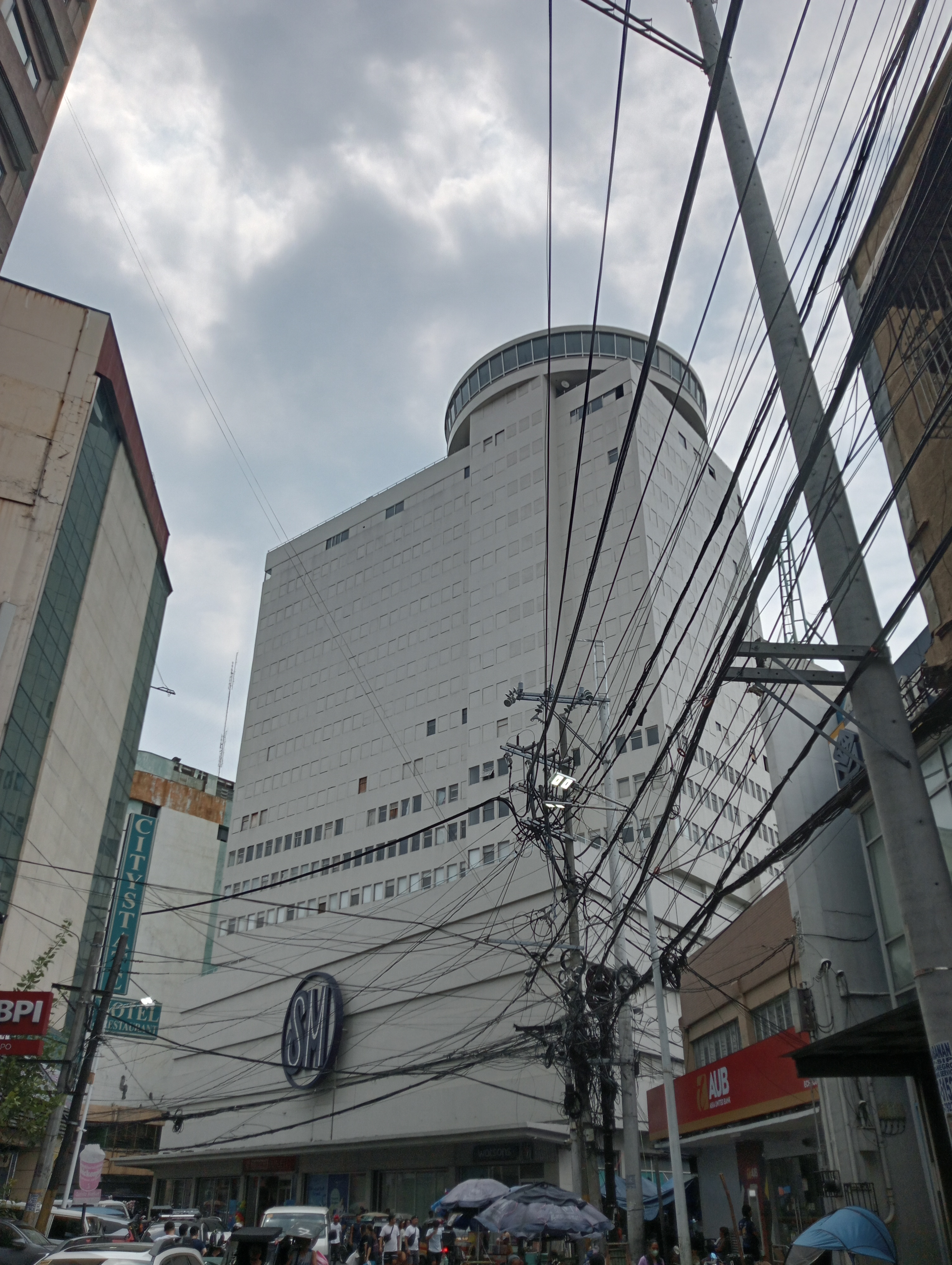
- The facade of SM Store Quiapo as SM Clearance Outlet in June 2024
- Location: Carlos Palanca Street, Quiapo, Manila, Philippines
- Coordinates: 14°35′55.09″N 120°58′54.60″E
- Opened: 1958; 68 years ago (as Shoemart)
- Manager: SM Investments
- Num. of anchor tenants: 1
- Floors: 4
- Public transit: Carriedo; Quinta Ferry Station

SM Quiapo (also known as SM Clearance Outlet and SM Carriedo) is the oldest active SM department store, opened in November 1972. The store was owned by the Chinese-Filipino billionaire Henry Sy and it is currently being managed by SM Investments's foundation, SM Department Store Inc. The store has been renovated and relaunched under the name SM Clearance Outlet.

== History ==
Henry Sy established shoe stores in Manila which were Plaza, Paris and Park Avenue which started with letter "P" prior to establishing the store that would be known as SM Quiapo. In 1958, he established a shoe store in Carriedo, Manila, which he named Shoemart after he was not able to come up with a name starting in "P".

The current occupied structure was once the Manila Royal Hotel; opened in 1971 and was famous for having one of the first circular viewing deck and revolving restaurants in the country. Other circular decks being the Hotel Enrico (1971) located in Ermita, Manila and the Mutya ng Pasig Tower (1974) in Pasig. Due to the economic collapse of the 1980s, the Manila Royal Hotel closed doors while the podium was rented and then eventually purchased by Sy.

The store was later expanded and began to sell clothes and accessories aside from just shoes. In 1972, Shoemart was expanded and became the first SM Department Store.

== See also ==
- SM North EDSA
