= SM Delgado =

Shopping mall in Iloilo City, Philippines

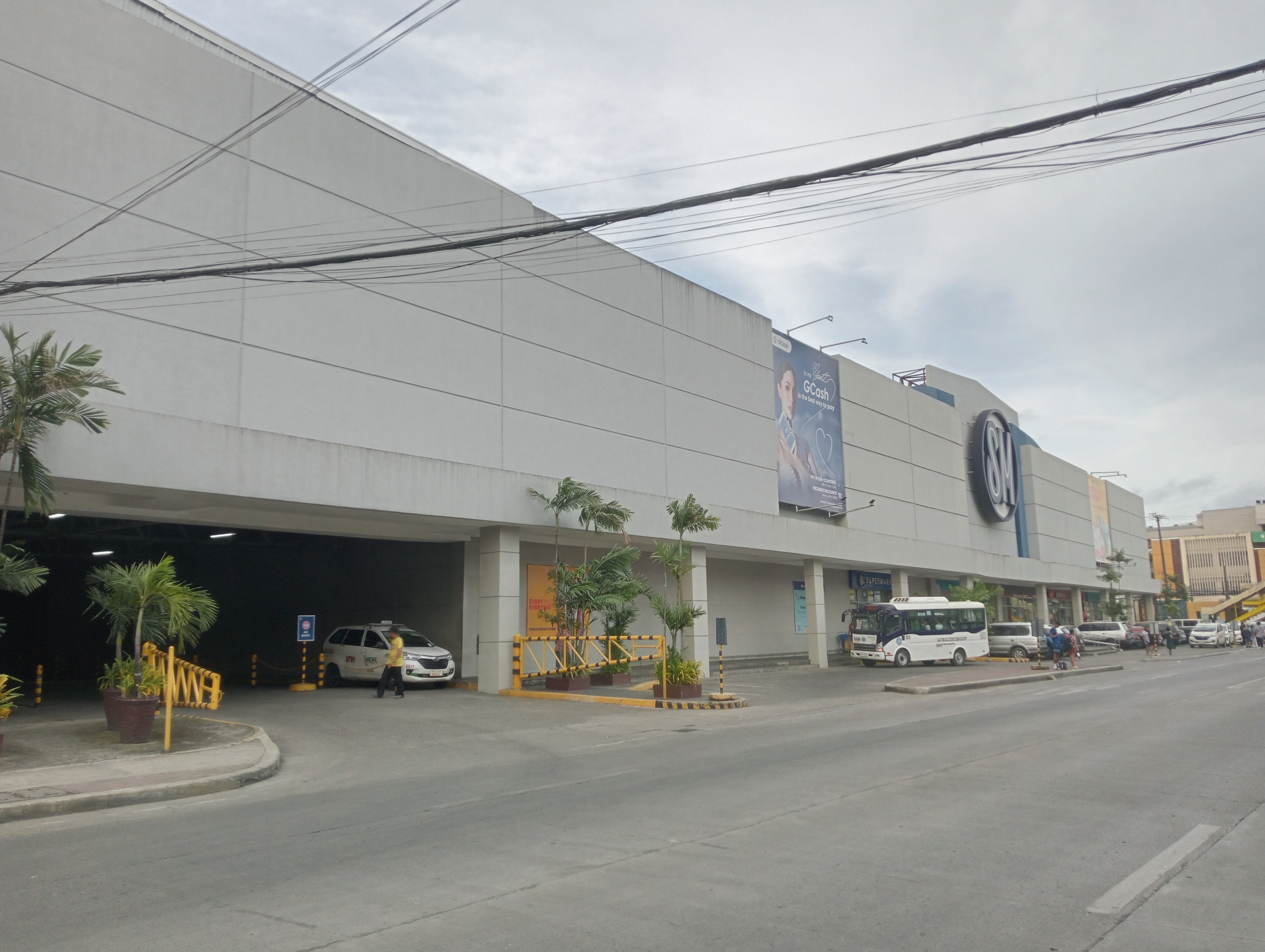
- SM Delgado in 2024
- Location: Delgado corner Valeria Sts., Iloilo City, Philippines
- Coordinates: 10°41′55″N 122°34′02″E
- Opened: May 15, 1979; 47 years ago (opened); December 8, 2004; 21 years ago (relaunched)
- Developer: SM Prime Holdings
- Owner: Henry Sy, Sr.
- Architect: JRP Design Inc.
- Num. of anchor tenants: 4
- Floor area: 28,000 m^{2} (300,000 sq ft)
- Floors: Main Building: 2; Annex Building: 1
- Parking: 200 slots

SM Delgado is a shopping mall in downtown Iloilo City, Philippines, owned by SM Land Inc. and operated by Metro Manila Shopping Mecca Corporation, the same SM Group arm that manages SM City Manila and SM City Santa Rosa. Located within Iloilo City Proper's commercial district along Delgado and Valeria Streets, it is the oldest SM Store and the first SM branch built outside Metro Manila, as well as the fourth SM Store developed by Henry Sy Sr. Originally a department store, SM Supermarket was later conceptualized and opened at the site in 1985.

Prior to the opening of SM City Iloilo on June 11, 1999, SM Delgado was originally known as SM Iloilo.

== History ==
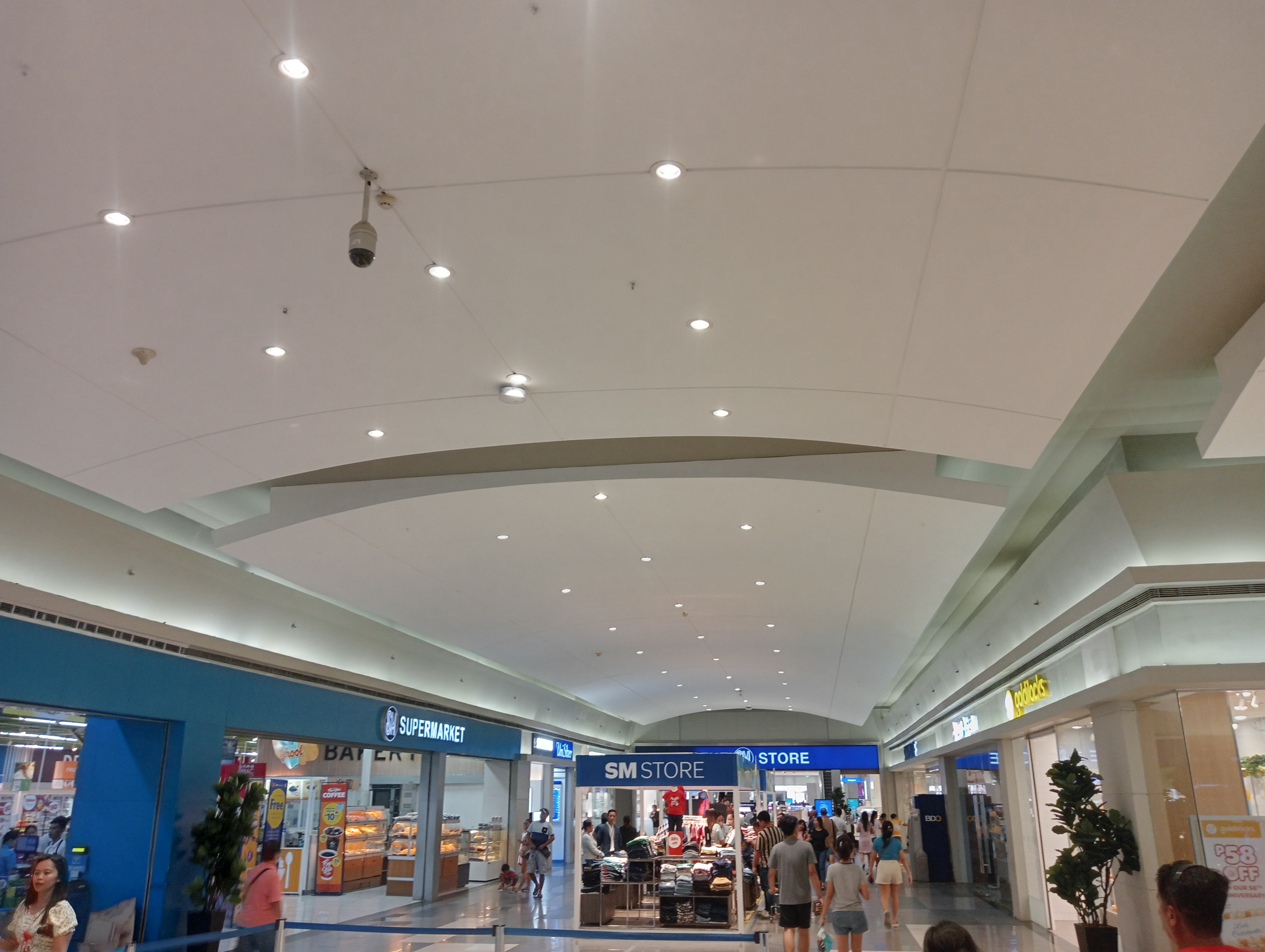
SM Delgado interior

By the mid‑1970s, ShoeMart was transitioning into a full‑line department store as SM and exploring opportunities to expand outside Metro Manila. Local business figures in Iloilo, particularly the Jamora family, owners of the Marymart Shopping Center, actively courted SM, as there were vacancies in their property following a 1966 fire. According to accounts of the store's early history, Henry Sy Sr. personally visited Iloilo, liked what he saw, and agreed to open a store there. The lease was signed in September 1978, and planning proceeded with the site chosen adjacent to the existing Marymart complex on Delgado Street. Construction and preparations led to the opening of SM Iloilo on May 15, 1979, as the fourth SM Store developed by Henry Sy Sr. and the first SM branch outside Metro Manila.

During the 1980s, the store expanded physically, growing from a single building to multiple interconnected buildings with mezzanine levels. In 1985, SM Supermarket was conceptualized and opened within the same complex. Following the opening of SM City Iloilo in Mandurriao on June 11, 1999, the mall was renamed SM Delgado.

In the early 2000s, plans were made to modernize SM Delgado. The original structure was demolished on February 2, 2004, to make way for a redesigned shopping complex. The rebuilt mall reopened on December 8, 2004, marking its formal relaunch with updated interiors and a broader mix of tenants. An annex building was later added in 2007, completing the mall's redevelopment.

== See also ==
- SM City Iloilo
