= List of Filipinos by net worth =

This is a list of the wealthiest Filipinos ranked by net worth based on an annual assessment of wealth and assets compiled and published by Forbes magazine in 2026. As of March 2026, there were 15 billionaires in the Philippines.

== Top 15 richest Filipinos ==
According to Forbes, as of March 2026, the 15 wealthiest individuals in the Philippines are as follows:

15 wealthiest people in the United States as of March 2026
Rank	2025 rank	Name	Net worth (US$ billions)	Primary source of wealth	Age
1 ▲	2	Enrique K. Razon	16.5	International Container Terminal Services, Bloomberry	66
2 ▲	3	Ramon Ang	3.6	San Miguel	72
3 ▲	4	Lucio Tan	3.5	LT Group	90
4 ▼	1	Manny Villar	3.1	Villar Group	76
5	5	Henry Sy Jr.	2.5	SM	72
6	6	Hans Sy	1.8	SM	70
6 ▲	7	Herbert Sy	1.8	SM	69
8	8	Harley Sy	1.7	SM	67
8 ▲	11	Andrew Tan	1.7	Alliance Global, Megaworld	74
10 ▲	12	Lucio Co	1.6	Cosco Capital	71
10 ▼	8	Teresita Sy-Coson	1.6	SM	75
12 ▼	10	Elizabeth Sy	1.5	SM	74
12 ▲	13	Susan Co	1.5	Cosco Capital	68
14	14	Tony Tan Caktiong	1.1	Jollibee	73
15	15	Eusebio Tanco	1.0	DigiPlus, STI College	76

== See also ==
- The World's Billionaires
- List of countries by the number of billionaires
