= SM City Fairview =

Shopping mall in Quezon City, Philippines

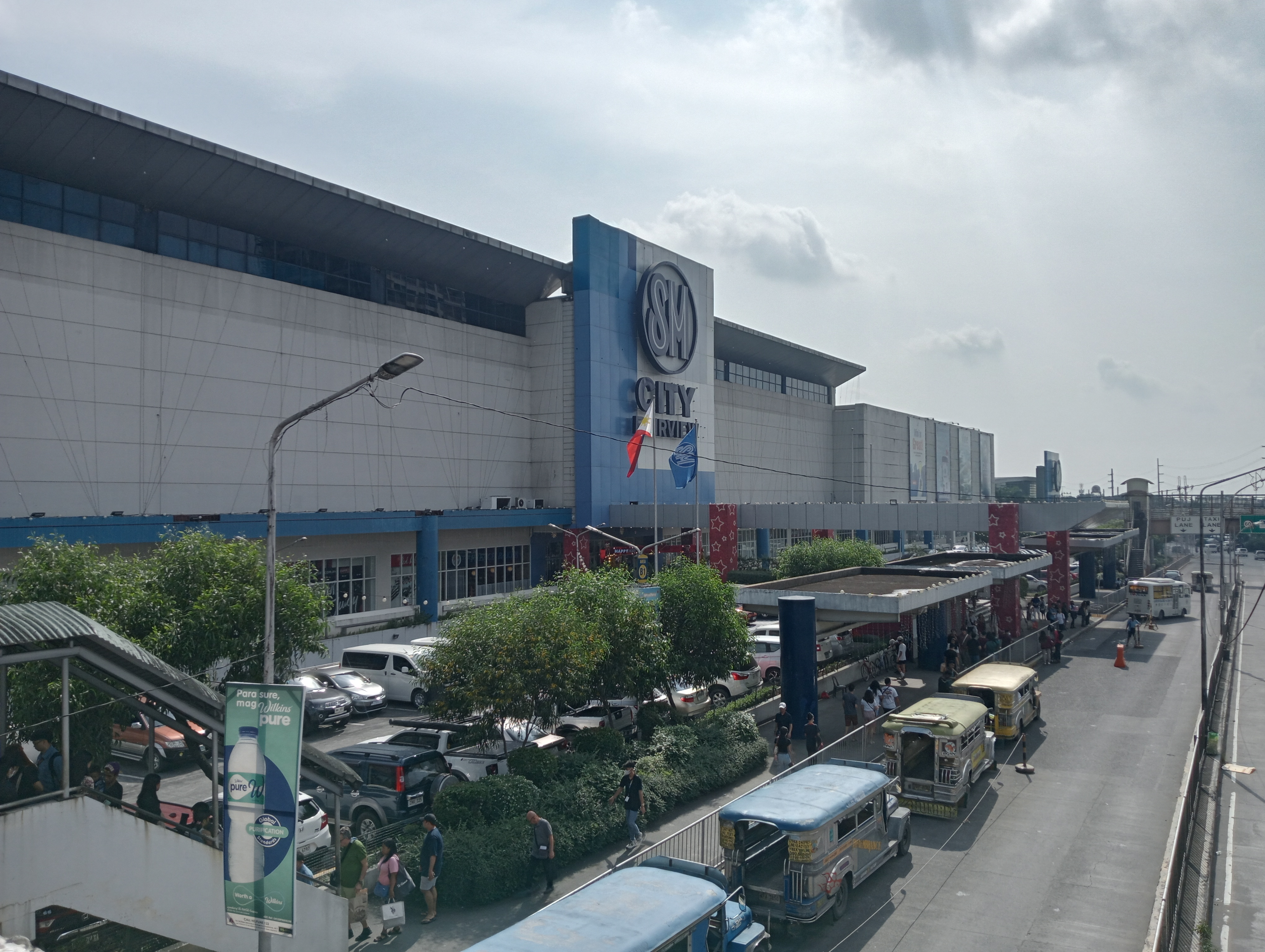
- The facade of SM City Fairview in September 2023
- Location: Quezon City, Metro Manila, Philippines
- Coordinates: 14°44′01″N 121°03′31″E
- Address: Quirino Highway corner Regalado Avenue, Barangays Greater Lagro and Pasong Putik
- Opened: October 25, 1997; 29 years ago
- Developer: SM Prime Holdings
- Manager: SM Prime Holdings
- Architect: Palafox & Associates (old main building); Point Design Inc. (renovations & annex)
- Num. of stores: 700+ shops and restaurants
- Num. of anchor tenants: 20+
- Floor area: 280,000 m^{2} (3,000,000 sq ft)
- Floors: Main Building: 4; Annex One: 2; Annex Two: 3; Parkway: 3; Fairview Towers (BPO Towers): 5
- Parking: Outdoor Parking: 2,000+ Parking Building: 600+
- Public transit: 6 17 39 41 49 SM City Fairview; 7 36 37 38 40 Robinsons Novaliches; Future: Mindanao Avenue
- Website: SM City Fairview

SM City Fairview is a large shopping mall located in Quezon City, Metro Manila, Philippines. It is owned and operated by SM Prime Holdings. It is the third SM Supermall in Quezon City, after SM North EDSA and SM City Sta. Mesa. This mall has approximately 130,000 daily visitors. It has a gross floor area of 280,000 square meters (3,000,000 sq ft). It is named after the nearby Fairview area or barangay, it is located in Barangays Greater Lagro and Pasong Putik.

Since September 2025, ongoing redevelopments, including a major expansion project, aim to integrate offices, hotels, and improved connectivity such as an intermodal terminal by 2028, with the total project gross floor area projected to reach 854,477 square meters.

== History ==
SM City Fairview is a part of the SM mall triplets designed by Palafox and Associates, a concept that was employed by SM at the height of the 1997 Asian financial crisis, of building three shopping malls in different areas under one design template. Thus, the mall's exterior facade and interior has similarities to SM City Bacoor and SM City Iloilo. The groundbreaking for SM City Fairview took place in late 1995. The mall opened on October 25, 1997, and underwent expansions in three annexes in 2004, 2009, and 2019. The mall initially consists of a rectangular-shaped building.

== Mall complex ==
SM City Fairview is a four-building, four-level complex with a gross floor area of 280,000 m^{2} (3,000,000 sq ft) located on a 20.2 ha (50 acres) site in Quezon City, Metro Manila. The mall has 4 major tenant zones: SM Foodcourt on the ground level of the main building, Cyberzone at the third Level of the main building and the Health and Wellness Zones.

Built atop the main and both annex buildings is SM Supermalls' largest solar panel system. Launched on July 24, 2025, it comprises 6,882 panels at 3.785 MWp capacity.

=== Main building ===
The main building measured 130,000 m^{2} (1,400,000 sq ft). It features mall tenants such as The SM Store and SM Supermarket, 8 cinemas, a 14-lane bowling center, billiard center, archery center, food court, Cyberzone, amusement areas, and international stores such as H&M, Uniqlo, Forever 21, etc. The second Health and Wellness Zone is located at the second level of the main building and was launched on July 16, 2010, after the opening of the Cyberzone. The mall formerly had an amusement center (SM Storyland) located on the third floor before it was close down in April 2014 and was renovated for the expansion of Cyberzone.

==== SM Cinema renovation ====
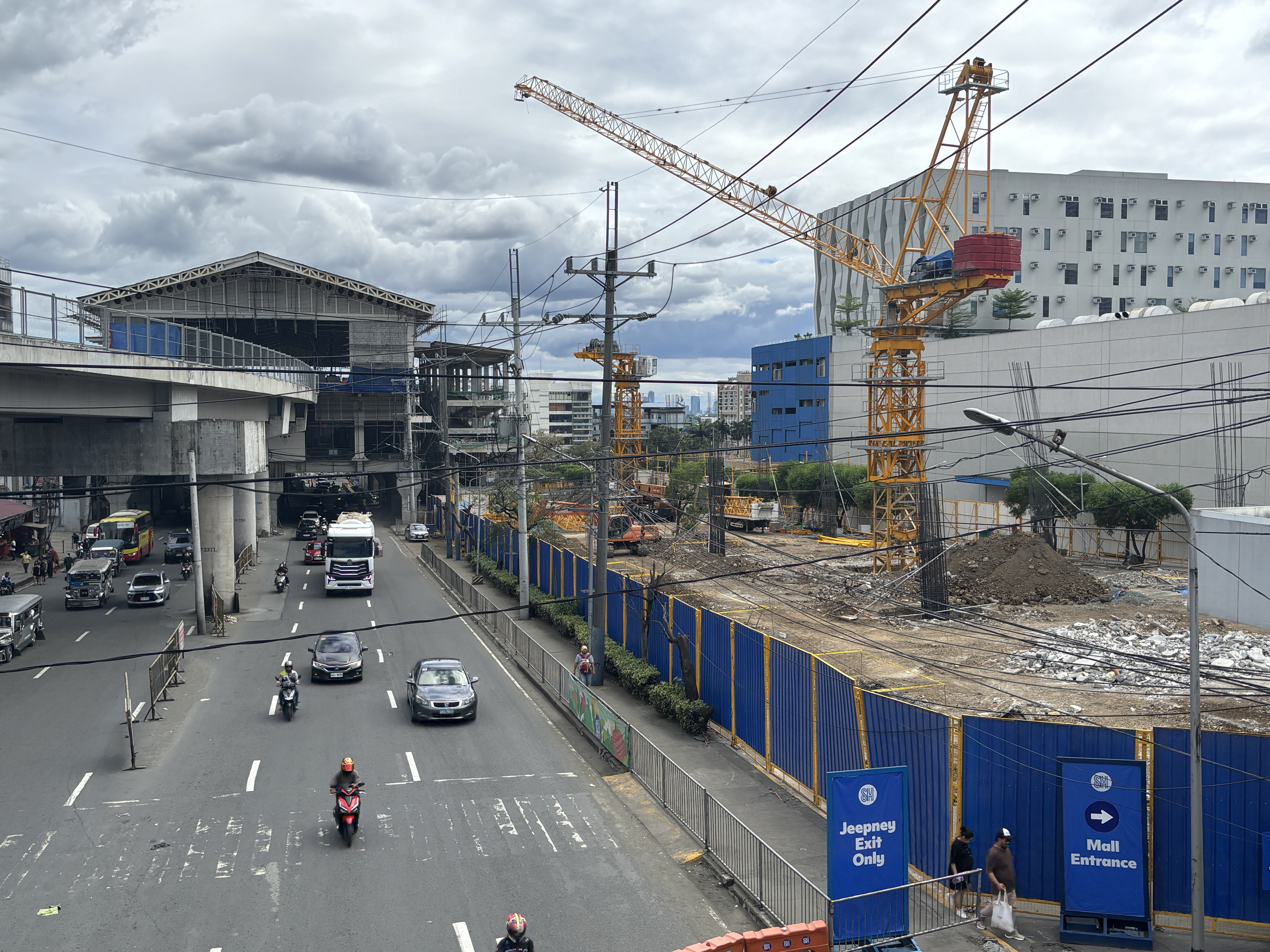
MRT-7 connection under construction between the mall and Mindanao Avenue station as of March 2025

The main building formerly had 12 cinemas, renovated in 2010 and half of the cinema area was closed in 2018 and reopened on November 22, 2019. The former Cinemas 7 to 12 is now home to a Large Format Theater (Megascreen, under new Cinema 1), 5 digital cinemas (under new Cinemas 2 to 6), and 2 Director's Club cinemas with Dolby Atmos sound system (under new Cinemas 7 and 8). The former Cinemas 2 to 5 in the other wing were closed for the continuation of the renovations, while the other two remain in temporary operations (Cinemas 9 and 10, which was formerly Cinemas 1 and 6) and they were closed on January 8, 2020, after the 2019 Metro Manila Film Festival. The former cinema wing will be renovated and planned as a retail space for MRT-7 connection. SM Game Park is one of the new tenants in this wing, relocating from the lower ground floor.

=== Annex 1 ===
The Annex 1 of the mall is a two-story building that opened on May 24, 2004. This 25,000 m^{2} (270,000 sq ft) building has two levels of retail shops and restaurants. Annex 1 has a large scale oval atrium that has a curved hallway and serves as one of the central hub for luxury shopping and events.

It also features a 9,000 m^{2} (97,000 sq ft) SM Hypermarket located on the lower ground level, the Palm Strip, and more shops and services. The Event Center and Ace Builders Center were once located in Annex 1 before they were relocated to Annex 2.

=== Annex 2 ===
Annex 2

Annex 2 of the mall opened on January 15, 2009. The current Annex 2 Mall measured 31,000 m^{2} (330,000 sq ft).

It is a three-story building with a large, semi-circle atrium it has a straight hallway typically runs along the flat edge of the semi-circle, and a longer curved hallway wraps around the rounded edge. It hosted major and big events, mall concerts, and product launches. Ace Builders Center and the first Health and Wellness Zone are located on the lower ground level of the Annex 2.

=== Parkway (Annex 3) ===
Annex 3 or the Parkway measured a total gross floor area of 94,000 m^{2} (1,010,000 sq ft). The Parkway (Annex 3) has a long hallway to connect three buildings at the back. The new expansion building has a house of few hundreds of tenants, a 2-floor parking building, five BPO towers and a rooftop garden. The SM Supermarket and SM Hypermarket has built their new entrance and exit to access The Parkway. It has been relaunched the same day when The Parkway opened.

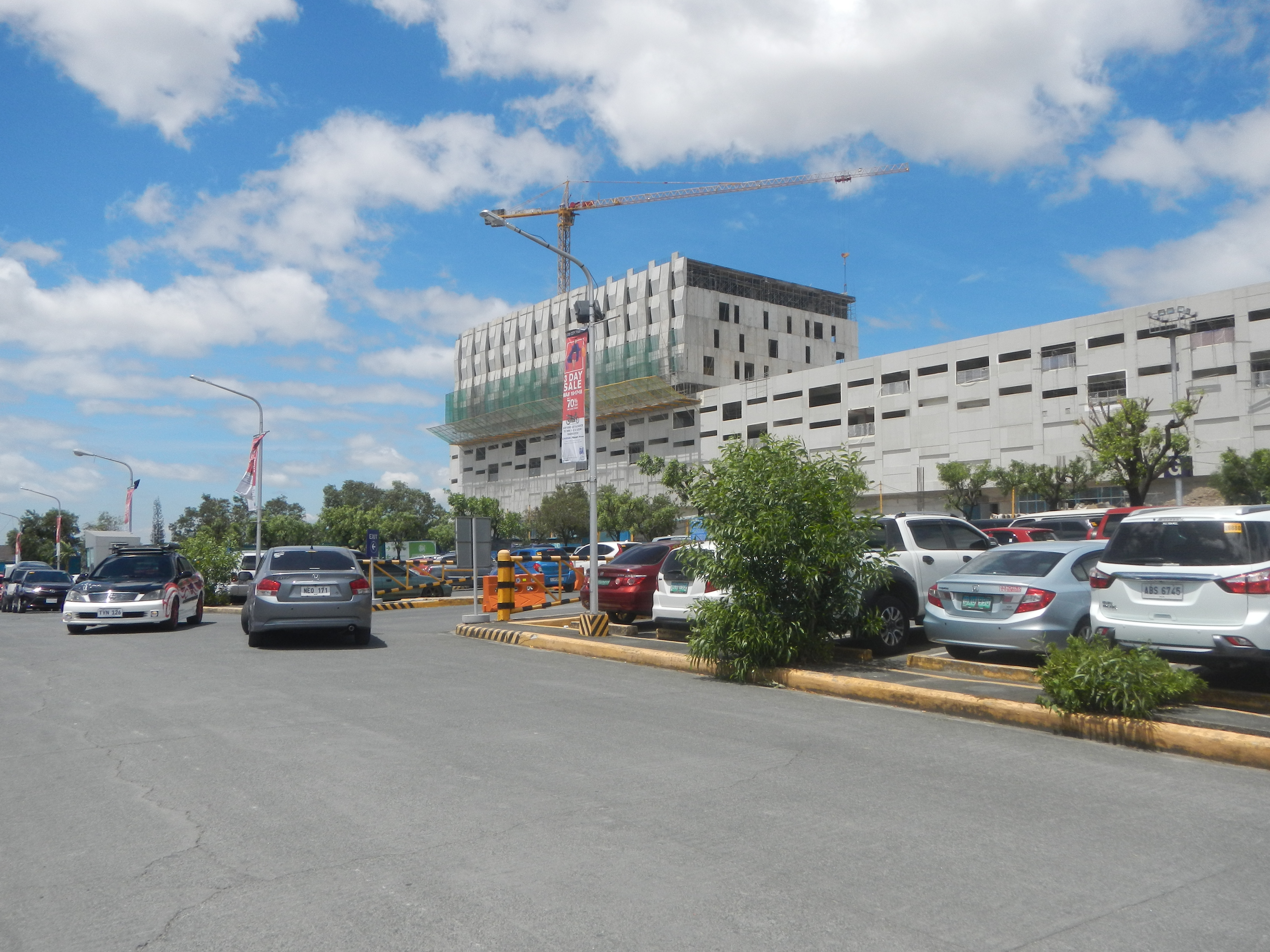
Fairview Towers under construction in 2018

The Fairview campus of the National University is located in one of the Fairview Towers, the mall's BPO towers. The first BPO Tower (Belfast Side) has been occupied by a private company and is operating since 2019. The remaining three towers were completed in 2021, 2022, and 2023 respectively. The Parkway officially opened its doors on April 27, 2019, with many activities and guests.

== Incidents ==
- December 24, 2019: A minor fire broke out at a Mang Inasal branch in the main building of the mall. The fire started at the kitchen of the said famous fastfood chain branch. After the fire, the mall temporarily closed and eventually opened later that afternoon. Some stalls were closed but some major tenants of the mall reopened again. The mall officials made an investigation regarding to the incident. The ill-fated branch has been closed for business.

== See also ==
- SM North EDSA
- Fairview Terraces
- Robinsons Novaliches

Preceded by SM City Bacoor	7th SM Supermall; 1997	Succeeded by SM City Iloilo
