= Toys "R" Us Asia =

Asian franchise headquartered in Hong Kong

Toys“R”Us Asia (Holding) Limited
- Type: Subsidiary
- Industry: Retail
- Area served: China (including Hong Kong); Japan; Malaysia; Singapore; Taiwan; Thailand; Brunei; Philippines (sub-franchised); Macau (sub-franchised); South Korea (separate)
- Owner: Fung Group; Lotte Mart (South Korea)
- Website: toysrus.com.hk

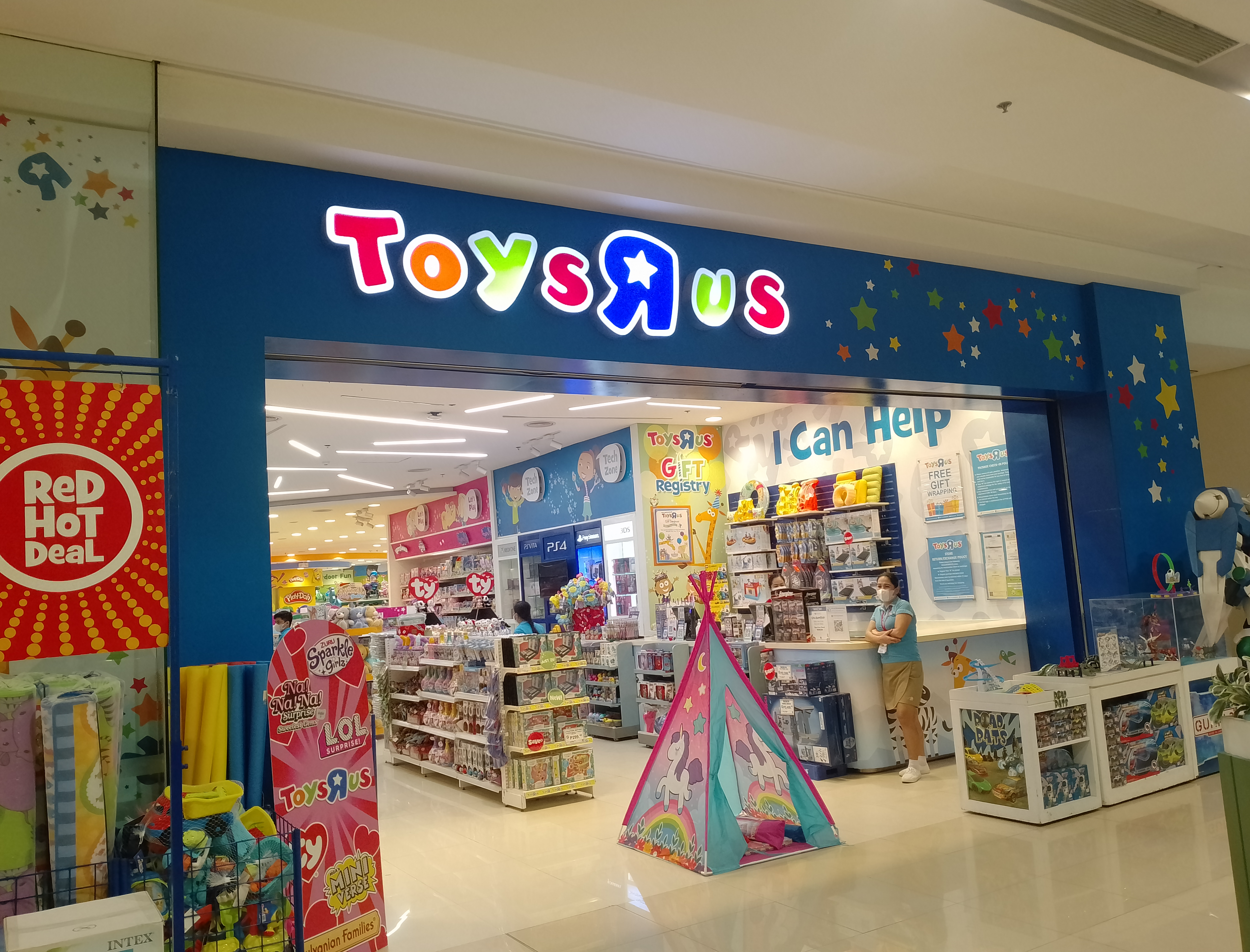
Toys "R" Us in Robinsons Galleria Cebu, Cebu City, Philippines, in 2023.

Toys“R”Us Asia (Holding) Limited is a multinational toy retailer headquartered in Hong Kong. Since November 2018, the company has been owned by Fung Group and a consortium of investors, operating as the regional Toys "R" Us franchisee under an agreement with Tru Kids, Inc.

The retailer operates in seven Asian countries, alongside overseeing sub-franchisees based in the Philippines and Macau.

The agreement between Fung Group and Tru Kids, Inc. excludes the Toys "R" Us locations in South Korea, which have been franchised and operated by Lotte Mart since December 2007.

== History ==
=== Early joint ventures ===
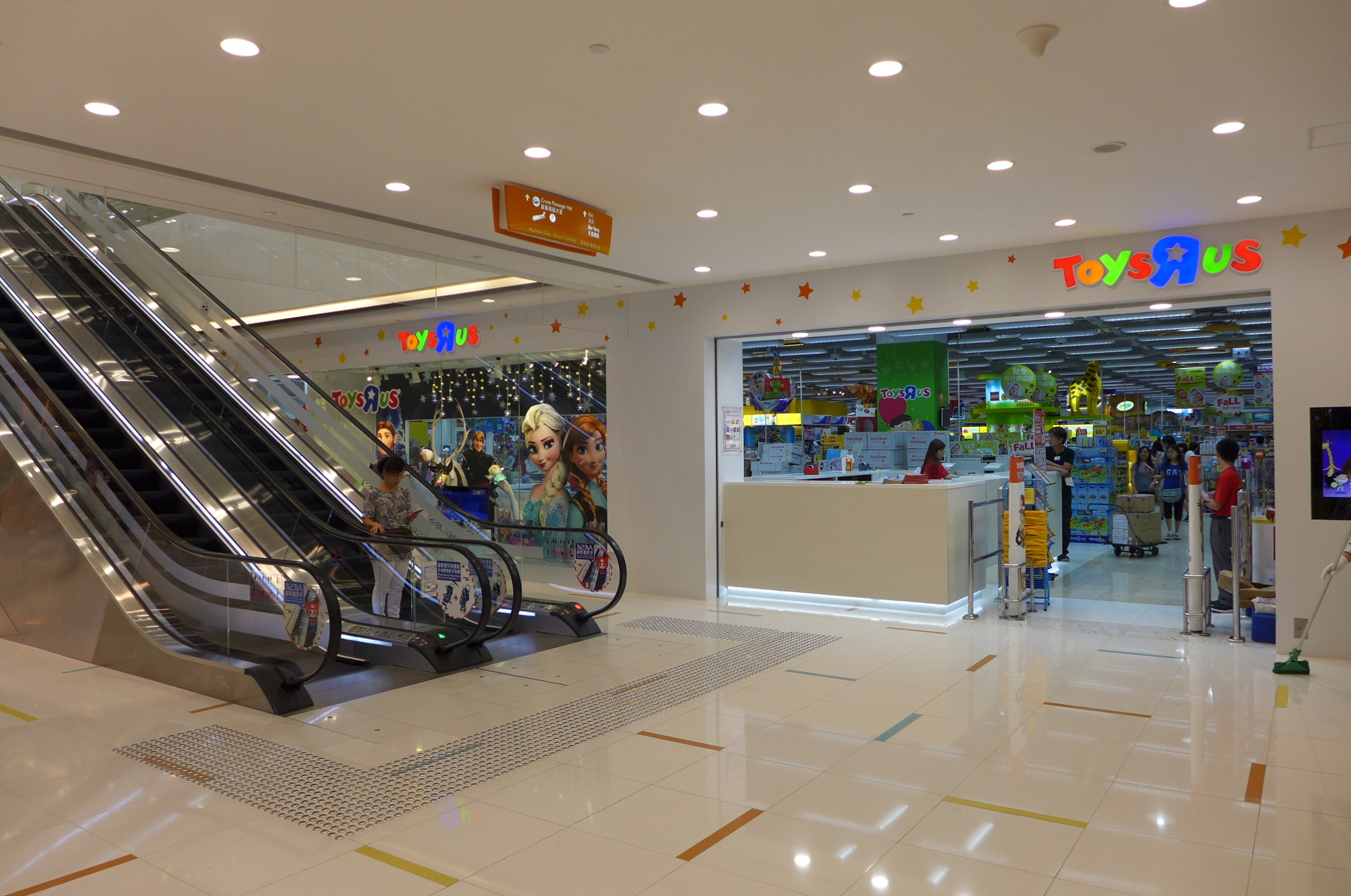
Toys "R" Us in Ocean Terminal, Tsim Sha Tsui, Hong Kong, China, in 2014.

The Asian unit was originally established in 1985 as a partnership between Toys "R" Us and Fung Retailing, the retail subsidiary of the Fung Group (a Hong Kong-based conglomerate that also owns Li & Fung, a major retail distributor), with the parent company owning a majority 85% stake while Fung Retailing owns the remainder of the shares.

The Singaporean operations of Toys "R" Us began in 1984 as a joint venture with Metro Holdings of Singapore, while the Malaysian operations was with Metro Holdings' Malaysian counterpart Metrojaya. Its first store was at the Marina Parade and the second was at Forum Galleria at Orchard Road. It expanded to Malaysia in November 1988 with its first outlet at Subang Parade. The Singaporean venture was terminated in 1993 when Metro Holdings sold its shares back to the parent company of Toys ‘R’ Us Inc. In September 1994, Metro Holdings sold 60% of its stake in Toys "R" Us Malaysia to Toys "R" Us Singapore.

Toys "R" Us expanded to Japan in 1991 as a joint venture with McDonald's Holdings Company (Japan), Ltd.. Its first store in Ami opened in November 1991 with 3,000 square meters of space, being the largest toy store in the country. Its second store in Kashihara opened in January 1992. The joint venture was supposed to last until 2018, but Toys "R" Us withdrew in 2006; after suing for breach of contract, McDonald's Holdings was awarded an ¥1.38 billion ($13.35 million) settlement in 2008. After their joint venture ended, Toys "R" Us increased their ownership from approximately 48% to about 61%, and integrated it into their overall Asian operation in 2017.

For RRHI to compete with SM Retail's Toy Kingdom, in 2006, RRHI obtained the license to operate Toys "R" Us stores in the Philippines, with the first location to open in Robinsons Galleria that same year. Locations in South Korea and India are established through joint ventures formed in conjunction with Lotte Mart in 2007 and Lulu Hypermarket in 2017, respectively.

=== Retail performance and sale to Fung Retailing ===
Buoyed by increasing demand for toys in the Asia Pacific region, the Asian and Japanese arms of Toys "R" Us are among the Toys "R" Us subsidiaries that have remained profitable into the 2000s and 2010s, registering "double-digit" revenue growth through the mid-to-late 2010s. In 2015, Toys "R" Us Asia posted a total turnover of US$1.85 billion; for the year ended January 2017, net sales from China and Southeast Asia totaled at approximately US$375 million while the Japanese arm would net sales of US$1.3 billion from Toys "R" Us, despite recently declining yearly profits, and US$20.3 million from Babies "R" Us.

While representatives of the Asian arm of Toys "R" Us have consistently cited that they operate as a separate legal entity from the parent company and are unaffected by events at the parent company, Toys "R" Us had engaged in talks since February 2018 to offload Toys "R" Us Asia's majority stake to a bidder for a proposed US$1 billion while outlets in Asia continue to operate unaffected. The planned bid was revised downwards to US$760 million in August and scheduled for September while Toys "R" Us sought a United States court order to strip Fung Retailing of its right-of-first-refusal purchase option and force Fung Retailing to release its share of the unit. This follows allegations by Toys "R" Us of Fung Retailing delaying the sale via court proceedings filed through the Hong Kong judiciary system to discourage rival bidders and acquire Toys "R" Us share at a lower price; the Eastern District of Virginia bankruptcy court would subsequently issue an order for Fung Retailing to drop its court order for the delay in a September 28, 2018, report.

On November 16, 2018, Toys "R" Us Asia announced that the parent company has formally sold the Asian unit to Fung Retailing and multiple Toys "R" Us lenders at a valuation of US$900 million (later revised to US$760 million), with Fung Retailing receiving an increase in shares of the unit to become the lead shareholder of Toys "R" Us Asia while securing the licensing rights to retain the Toys "R" Us namebrand.

in June 2021, Toys "R" Us stores in India were rebranded.

In September 2026, Toys "R" Us Asia announced that they were considering exiting the Japanese market at the end of the year by announcing a plan to sell the stores to Pan Pacific International Holdings, the owner of the Don Quijote discount store chain. The decision was made following years of continued profit losses mainly caused by a decline in birth rates in the country and an increased interest in online shopping. On 1 October 2026, the Japanese division officially filed for civil rehabilitation and a transfer of its retail and online businesses to Pan Pacific International Holdings division Operation Shared Service. The sale is due to close on 30 October, subject to court permission and other conditions. Toys "R" Us Asia said that its operations outside Japan were unaffected.
