= Toy Kingdom =

Philippine toy store chain

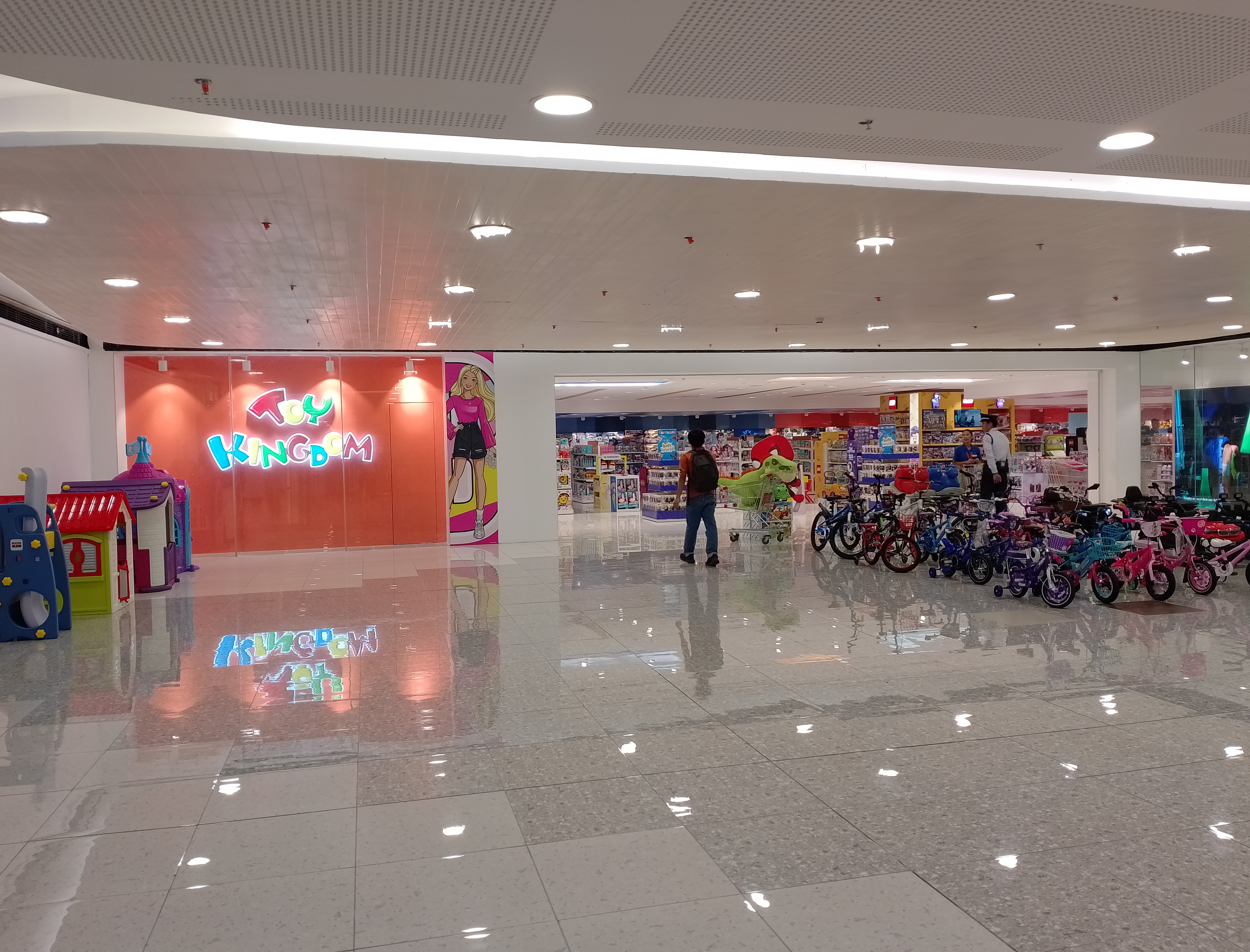
- Toy Kingdom branch at SM City Cebu
- Type: Subsidiary
- Industry: Retail
- Founded: 1991
- Headquarters: SM Retail Headquarters, J.W. Diokno Boulevard corner Bayshore Ave. MOA Complex, Pasay City, Philippines
- Area served: Nationwide
- Products: Toys
- Owner: SM Retail
- Number of employees: 59,000
- Website: toykingdom.com.ph

International Toyworld Inc., doing business as Toy Kingdom, is a large Philippine toy store chain owned and developed by the SM Group by the late Chinese Filipino businessman, Henry Sy, Sr. It features a variety of toys marketed towards children of all age groups. The first branch opened at SM Megamall in 1991. Now more than 20 branches are opened inside and outside SM Supermalls. Aside from the regular Toy Kingdom stores, SM Stores have smaller toy sections called Toy Kingdom Express.

Toy Kingdom's main rivals in the Philippines are Toys "R" Us (located at several Robinsons Malls, and Ayala Malls) and ToyTown (with branches at Glorietta, Festival Alabang, and Market! Market!). Kidz Station (with three locations in Makati and one at the Shangri-La Plaza in Mandaluyong) was also a rival store until Toys "R" Us acquired them in November 2010.

As of 2026, International Toyworld Inc. co-operates Nintendo Authorized Stores in the country.

== History ==
In March 2020, Toy Kingdom temporarily shut down its stores and paused their operations in Metro Manila, Luzon and Cagayan de Oro due to the implementation of the community quarantine and the enhanced community quarantine caused by the COVID-19 pandemic in the country. Later however, all other Toy Kingdom stores nationwide, along with their online stores in Lazada and Metromart, as well as customer service support, followed closure and also ceased operations due to the pandemic.

=== Expo involvement ===
Toy Kingdom holds the biennial major event Toy Expo Philippines, which gathers toy brands to showcase their latest offerings through exhibit set-ups and activities. A free-admission event, usually held during August at the SMX Convention Center in the Mall of Asia Complex, Toy Expo Philippines started in 2012. It held its 4th edition in 2018 from August 24 to 26 participated by brands such as Peppa Pig, My Little Pony, Play-Doh, Shopkins, Littlest Pet Shop, PAW Patrol, Super Wings, Lego, Hot Wheels, Matchbox, Maisto, Kultura Toy Souvenirs, Barbie, Polly Pocket, Monster High, Transformers, and many more.

== Toy Kingdom Amazing Card ==
The Toy Kingdom Amazing Card is a loyalty program in which members are able to earn reward points, savings, and are entitled to exclusive privileges throughout the membership period.

== See also ==
- Toys "R" Us Philippines, Toy Kingdom's main competitor
