= Delgado (disambiguation) =

Delgado is a Spanish and Portuguese surname.

Delgado may also refer to:

- Delgado, San Salvador, a city of about 175,000 in El Salvador, located to the east of the capital, San Salvador
- Delgado (footballer) (born 1957), Portuguese footballer
- The Delgados, a Scottish indie rock band
- Delgado Community College, a community college in the New Orleans, Louisiana area

== See also ==
- Cabo Delgado Province, a province of Mozambique
- Cape Delgado, a coastal headland on the border of Mozambique and Tanzania
- SM Delgado, a department store in Iloilo City, Philippines
