= Henry Sy Sr. Hall =

Research facility in Manila, Philippines

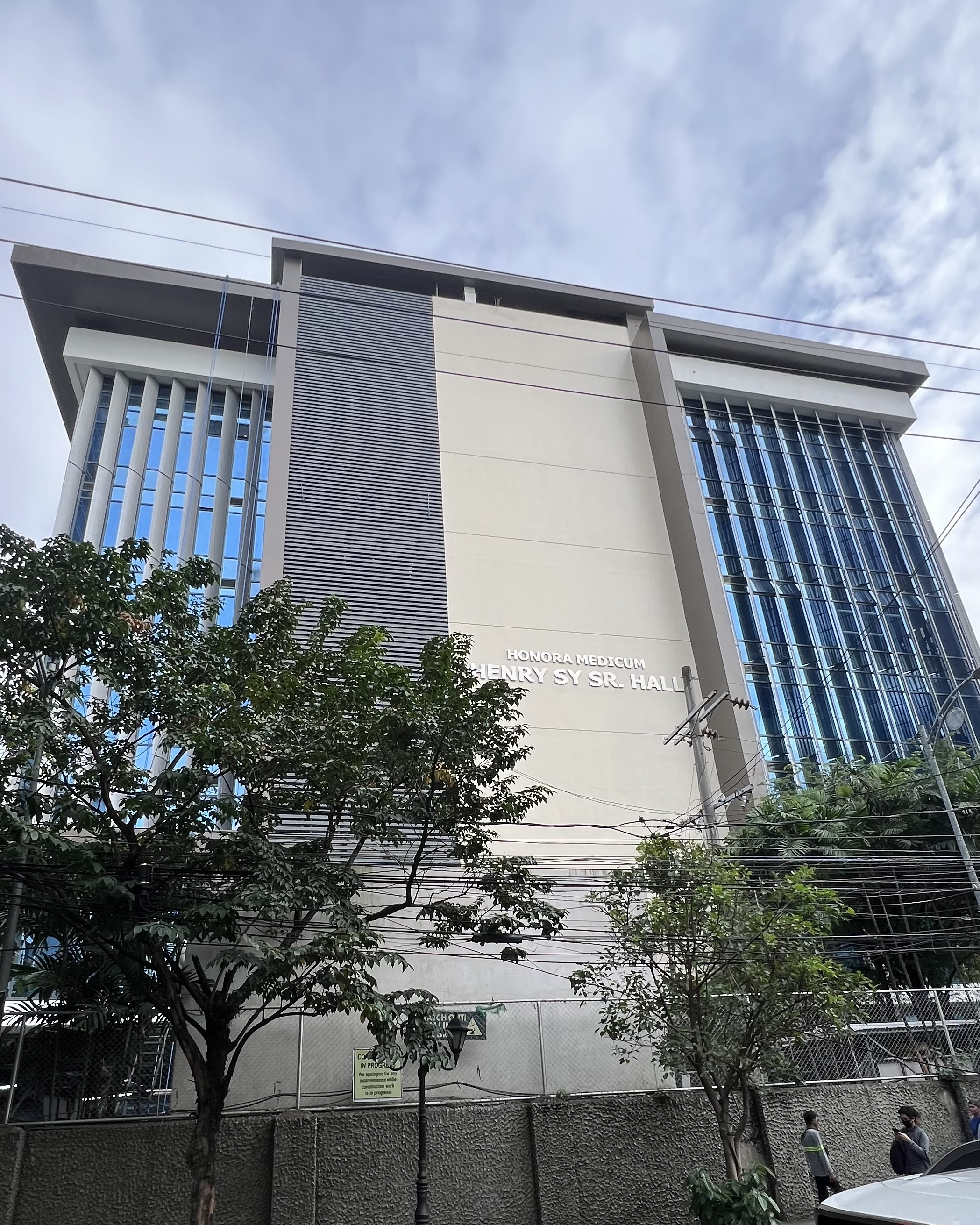
- The Henry Sy Sr. Hall as seen from the Dapitan Street
- Interactive map of the Henry Sy Sr. Hall area

General information
- Type: Educational
- Location: University of Santo Tomas; Manila, Philippines
- Coordinates: 14°36′40″N 120°59′17″E
- Named for: Henry Sy
- Construction started: January 2020
- Completed: September 2024

Technical details
- Floor count: 7

Design and construction
- Architects: Rodolfo Ventura of CA Ventura & Partners
- Other designers: Multi-Line Building Systems, Inc.
- Main contractor: AIMM Builders and Construction Supply

The Henry Sy Sr. Hall is an academic and research building on the campus of the University of Santo Tomas in Manila, Philippines. It houses the Saints Cosmas and Damian Center for Simulation and Research of the Faculty of Medicine and Surgery and the William F. Austin Center for Ear and Hearing Healthcare. It is named after the founder of the SM Investments, Henry Sy.

== History ==
The construction of the building broke ground in January 2020 coinciding with the opening of the sesquicentennial celebration of the Faculty of Medicine Surgery (FMS). The building was initially named as Saints Cosmas and Damian Simulation and Research Building, after the patron saints of the faculty.

In October 2022, the faculty launched the Go Further: Beyond 150 Years – A Capital Campaign project that would fund the educational development, scholarships, and the building's construction. The Anargyroi: FMS Foundation, Inc. (AFI) headed the project, which sought to raise ₱1.2 billion in funds.

The topping off of the building was held on October 7, 2023. It was inaugurated on September 28, 2024 by the SM Foundation to commemorate Sy Sr.’s centennial.

=== Fundraising ===
- Henry Sy Foundation (₱300M)
- Drs. Peter and Linda Fang ($4M)
- Family of Dr. Eduardo Gotamco Tan
- Sesquicentennial Watch Group
- Starkey Hearing Technologies ($200K)
- UST Medicine Class of 1982
- UST Medicine Class of 1986
- Family of Dr. Alfredo Ang Kian To
- Family of Tanya Lim Ong
- Family of Eng Ho Tan & Kee Hui Eng
- Family of Cua Bun Kim and Delfina Co Cuaso
- Dr. Visitacion Alcalde Aromin and Ms. Irene Safran
- Megaworld Corporation

== Building ==
The hall has dedicated floors for the faculty's research centers, graduate programs, and the Ethics Review Board. It also houses the Eduardo Gotamco Tan Study Hall, which is an alternative study space for medicine students.

The seven-story building was designed by Rodolfo Ventura, the dean of the UST College of Architecture and the principal architect of C.A. Ventura and Partners.

It also features the CME auditorium on the seventh floor.

== Saints Cosmas and Damian Center for Simulation and Research ==
The center is named after Saints Cosmas and Damian, the patron saints of the faculty. It features simulated emergency rooms, surgical suites, delivery rooms, intensive care units, patient wards, and doctors' consultation rooms.

== William F. Austin Center for Ear and Hearing Healthcare ==
In 2022, the US-based Starkey Hearing Technologies donated $200,000 for the naming rights of a dedicated audiology laboratory.

== Gallery ==
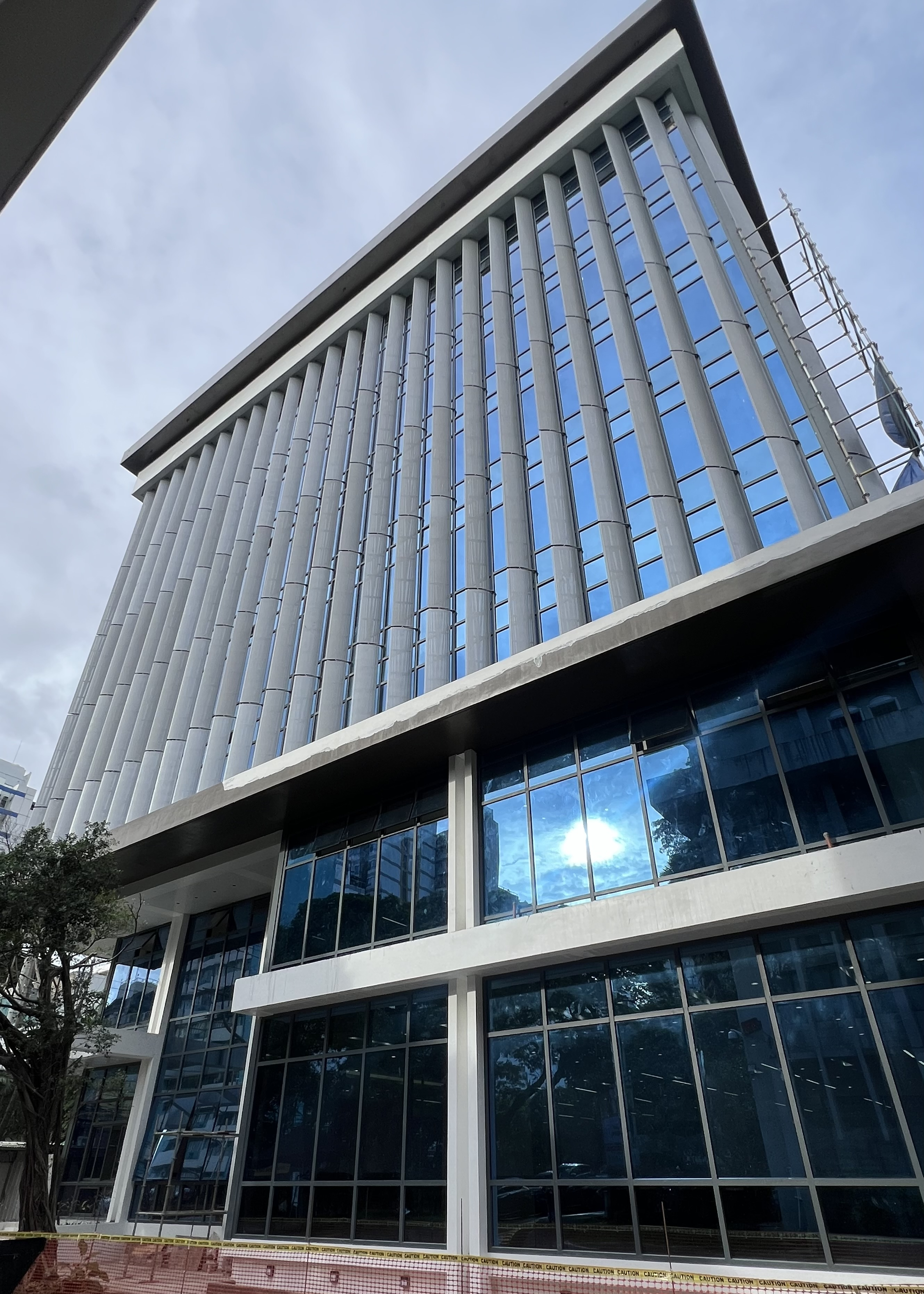
The brise soleil details as viewed from the Benavides Building

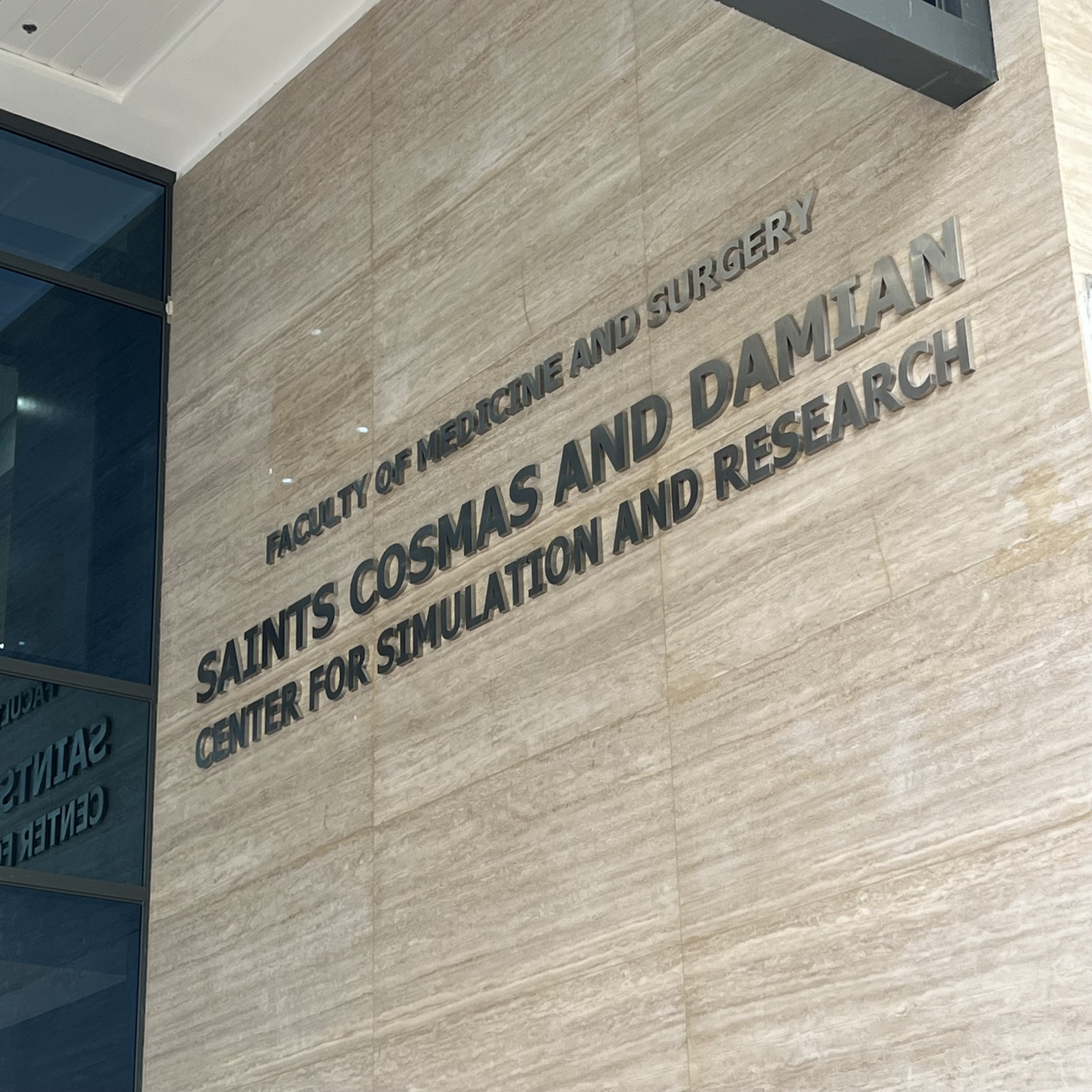
The entrance to the hall
