= SM City Iloilo =

- The facade of SM City Iloilo in May 2024
- Location: Mandurriao, Iloilo City, Philippines
- Coordinates: 10°42′52″N 122°33′04″E
- Address: Senator Benigno S. Aquino Jr. Avenue, Mandurriao
- Opened: June 11, 1999; 27 years ago
- Developer: SM Prime Holdings
- Owner: SM Prime Holdings
- Architect: Palafox Associates; D.A. Abcede & Associates
- Num. of stores: 450+
- Num. of anchor tenants: 7 (+ SM Savemore Strata)
- Floor area: 105,953 m^{2} (1,140,470 sq ft)
- Floors: Main Building and expansion wing : 4; South Point buildings : 2; North Block: 10
- Parking: Outdoor Parking : 2000+; Parking Building : 650+
- Website: SM City Iloilo

SM City Iloilo, also known locally as SM Mandurriao, is a large shopping mall in Mandurriao, Iloilo City, Philippines, owned and operated by SM Prime Holdings. It is the 8th SM Supermall built by the company. It is located along Senator Benigno S. Aquino Jr. Avenue (Diversion Road) in the district of Mandurriao. It has a land area of 183,281 m^{2} (1,972,820 sq ft) and a total gross floor area of 105,953 m^{2} (1,140,470 sq ft). Since its opening in 1999, it has been the largest mall in Iloilo and Western Visayas.

== Mall features ==
SM City Iloilo is a four-level complex consisting of the lower ground level, upper ground level, second level, and third level, with a total retail floor area of 105,953 m^{2} (1,140,470 sq ft). It is located in Mandurriao, Iloilo City. The mall features a department store, supermarket, six cinemas (including an IMAX theater), an appliance center, a food hall, a food court, and a Cyberzone. The SM Foodcourt is located on the lower ground level of the Main Building, SM Cyberzone on the third level of the North Point, and SM Food Hall on the second level of the North Point.

== History ==
=== Initial development ===
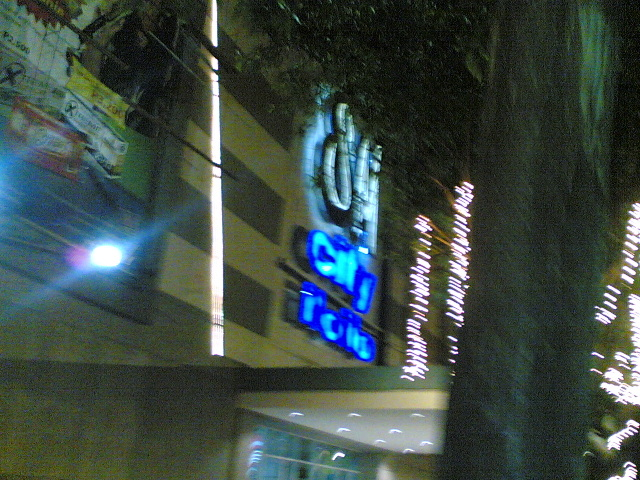
The mall's earlier façade in 2009

The mall complex was designed by Palafox Associates with D.A. Abcede & Associates as consultants, and Young Builders Corporation as the contractor. Built on the same design template as SM City Fairview and SM City Bacoor at the height of the Asian Financial Crisis, although a bit smaller than the two other malls at the time it was built. Its interior and external façade bear a resemblance to the two other malls, with a larger perron on its main entrance. SM City Iloilo was opened to the public on June 11, 1999. The mall features main anchors like The SM Store, SM Supermarket, SM Cinemas, SM Food Hall, and SM Foodcourt. The mall underwent a major renovation in the second quarter of 2008 and was completed in the first quarter of 2009. TeleTech Customer Care Management Philippines Inc., a BPO company, used to occupy the entire third level of the mall (not including the expansion wing) until 2021. The former area has been converted to tenant spaces consisting of leisure and technology shops. The expanded SM Cyberzone occupying parts of the Main Wing area in third level opened on August 28, 2025. On December 30, 2025, the remaining area on the same level opened, which consists of Fantasy World and some other leisure tenants. With its completion, it fully opened up the third level of the Main Mall to the public for the first time since the mall originally opened.

The main building is currently under renovation as of October 2024 and is set to be completed within 2026.

=== Expansion ===
SM Iloilo complex featuring Park Inn by Radisson Hotel (left side back of the mall) and SMDC's Style Residences (center back of the mall)

==== South Point ====
In 2009, an annex (The South Point) with a floor area of 4,218 m^{2} (45,400 sq ft), adjacent to the main mall building was built to house some food-based tenants.

==== North Point ====
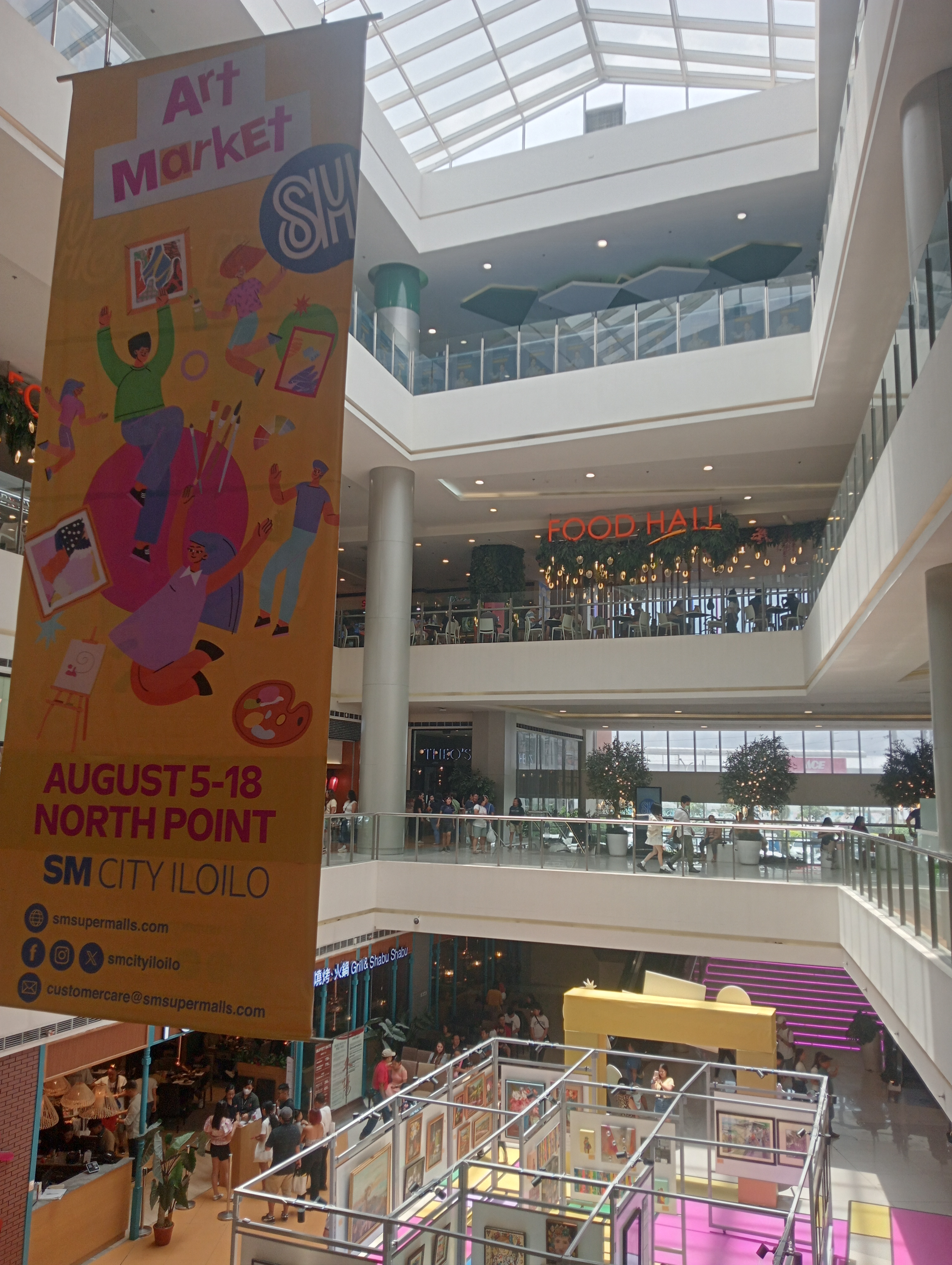
North Point interior

In 2015, the new expansion wing (also known as North Point in SM City Iloilo's Facebook posts) was opened on the north side of the mall to accommodate more than 165 local and international shops and restaurants. It also featured the third SM Food Hall in the country after SM Megamall and SM Aura and a larger Cyberzone in the third level. The expansion is seamlessly connected to the main building.

==== South Point expansion ====
On November 11, 2016, the South Point expansion with a floor area of 24,854.93 m^{2} (267,536.2 sq ft) opened and is located near the south entrance of the main mall. The area was formerly occupied by a parking area. It was built to house additional food-based tenants. The South Point expansion is connected to the Main Mall through a bridge. It also has a mini park with the fountain court.

==== North Block ====
Set to be completed in 2026, the 10-storey expansion beside North Point will feature retail spaces, a multilevel car park, and a campus of National University, which is scheduled to open in academic year 2027.

The new car park soft-opened on December 6, 2025, in time for the holiday season. A bridge connecting parking level 3 of the new car park to the second level of North Point opened a week later.

=== Cinema renovation ===
The mall's Cinemas 1 to 4 closed for renovation in 2022 and reopened on February 28, 2023, initially with three regular cinemas, including a large-format auditorium designated as Cinema 3.

Two Director's Club cinemas opened on April 22, 2023.

An IMAX with Laser theater, located on the site of the former Cinema 4, opened on November 15, 2023. It is equipped with an IMAX with Laser XT projector, a lower-cost variant of IMAX's laser projection system. It is the first IMAX with Laser theater owned and operated by SM Cinema. The former Cinemas 5 to 8 were converted into tenant spaces.

== Mall complex developments ==
=== SM Strata ===
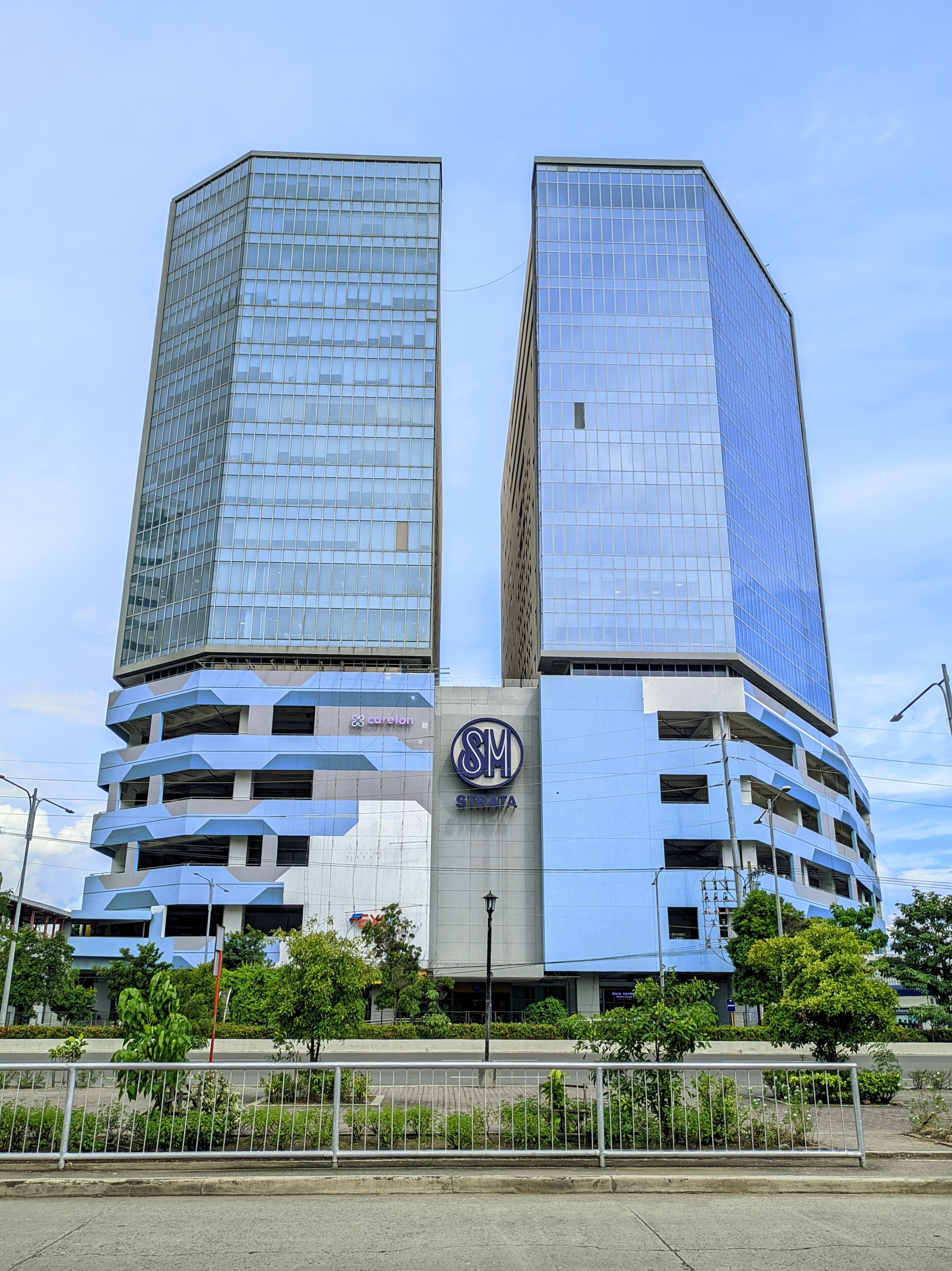
SM Strata houses IT-BPO companies like Teletech, EXL Service, Hinduja, and Carelon Global Solutions.

SM Strata, a business process outsourcing (BPO) twin towers and parking garage, is located at the northeastern side (at the Northbound section of Diversion Road) facing the main mall. The first 6 parking levels were opened on November 11, 2017, with a connection from the footbridge in the 2nd floor. It has 18 floors, the ground level will serve as a transportation terminal, the 2nd to 5th floors serve as a parking area for SM Clients, and the 6th to 18th floors that are reserved for BPO offices. It also hosts the first Telus International Philippines contact center outside Metro Manila, along with Teletech (which relocated from the 3rd Level of the mall), EXL, and Carelon Global Solutions (formerly Legato Technologies). The building has a GFA of 45,000 sqm.

The second tower was completed in mid-2024.

=== Park Inn by Radisson Iloilo ===
Known as the first Park Inn Hotel in the Visayas, the 10-storey hotel is built next to the mall's South Point expansion and has 199 rooms.

=== Style Residences ===
The first SMDC development in Iloilo, it is a five 16-storey condominium complex located at the back of the mall. The buildings have been turned over to residents since the fourth quarter of 2023.

== See also ==
- SM Delgado

Preceded by SM City Fairview	8th SM Supermall; 1999	Succeeded by SM City Manila
