= Lotte Mart =

South Korean hypermarket chain

- Type: Division
- Industry: Retail
- Founded: 1998; 28 years ago
- Founder: Shin Kyuk-Ho
- Number of locations: 175 (2023)
- Area served: East Asia and Southeast Asia
- Products: Fresh foods, processed foods, household goods, clothing and miscellaneous
- Brands: Toys "R" Us Asia
- Owner: Lotte Shopping

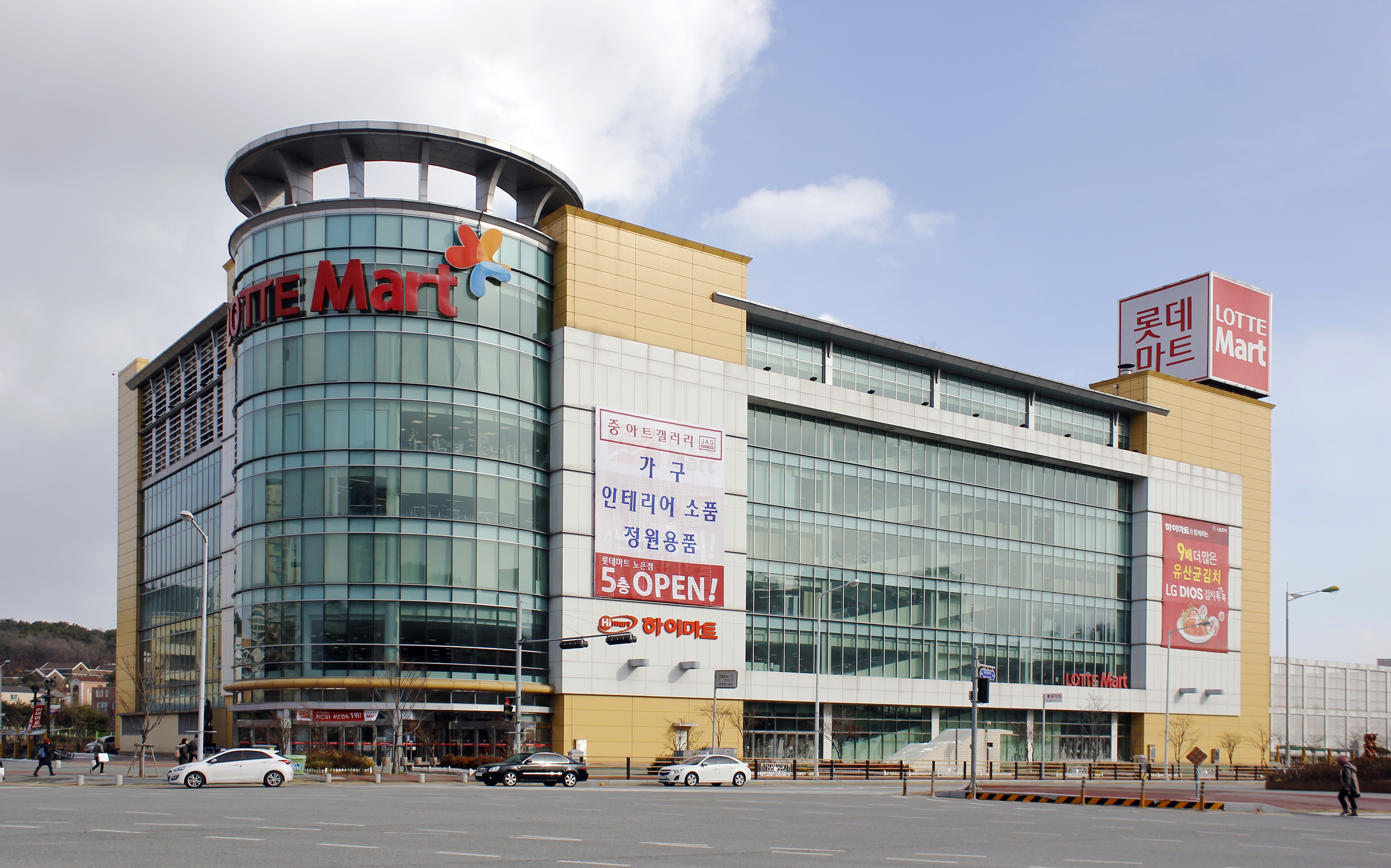
A Lotte Mart in Yuseong District, Daejeon, South Korea

Lotte Mart (Korean: 롯데마트) is a South Korean hypermarket that sells a variety of groceries, clothing, toys, electronics, and other goods, with headquarters in South Korea. Lotte Mart is a division of the Lotte Co., Ltd. which sells food and shopping services in South Korea and Japan. Lotte Mart, part of the Korean conglomerate "Lotte", opened its first branch at Guui-dong, GangByeon, Seoul, Korea on April 1, 1998. In 2006, Lotte Mart opened its first overseas branch. As of August 8, 2011, Lotte Mart had 199 branches (92 branches in Korea, 82 branches in China, 23 branches in Indonesia, and 13 branches in Vietnam). Store brands include Herbon, Wiselect, Withone, Basicicon, Tasse Tasse, and Gerard Darel.

== Operating divisions ==
=== International locations ===
==== China ====
In December 2007, Lotte Mart bought out Makro, an established supermarket chain from the Netherlands. By purchasing Makro, Lotte Mart was able to gain access to the Chinese market. This was the first time a Korean retailer had entered the Chinese market. There are now 82 branches of Lotte Mart in China.

In April 2018, Lotte Mart confirmed to exit Beijing operations by selling its 21 Beijing stores to Chinese supermarket operator Wumei Holdings Inc.

Lotte Mart exited the Chinese market in 2022 to focus on its business in Southeast Asia.

==== Indonesia ====
Continuing their expansion plans, in October 2008, Lotte bought PT Makro Indonesia. PT Makro Indonesia, who operated Makro stores, ran 19 stores in Indonesia. This was also the first time Korean retail had entered the Indonesian market. As of 2019 there are 50 stores in Indonesia. Since then, as of 2024, it runs 36 wholesale marts and 12 retail stores, similar to discount marts in Korea.

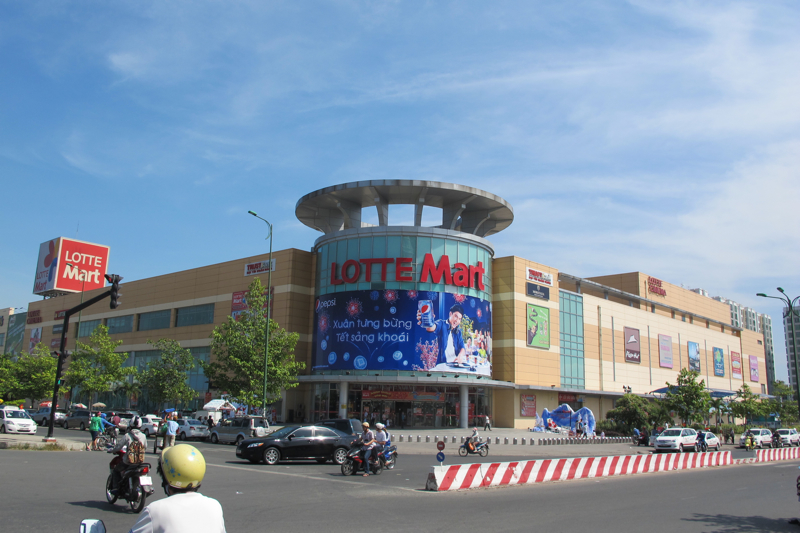
Lotte Mart South Saigon in Tân Hưng, Ho Chi Minh City

==== Vietnam ====
On December 18, 2008, Lotte Mart established its first Vietnamese branch in District 7, Ho Chi Minh City as Lotte Mart South Saigon. As of 2025, there are 15 stores in Vietnam, including cities are Ho Chi Minh City, Hanoi, Cần Thơ, Biên Hòa, Thuận An, Bình Dương, Vinh, Vũng Tàu, Nha Trang, Phan Thiết. The Lotte Mart West Lake is part of the Lotte Mall West Lake Hanoi, the first Lotte Mall complex in the nation.

=== Toys "R" Us ===
Lotte Mart made a licensed contract with Toys "R" Us in December 2007. The first Toys R Us opened in South Korea on December 8, 2007. It was opened in the 37,000 sq ft (3,400 m^{2}) Lotte Mart Guro Branch in Seoul, Korea. Other Toys R Us locations are in Guri, Incheon, Samsan, and Jamsil. The Lotte Mart Company planned to open 20 more Toys R Us stores by 2012.
