= SM City Bacoor =

Shopping mall in the Philippines

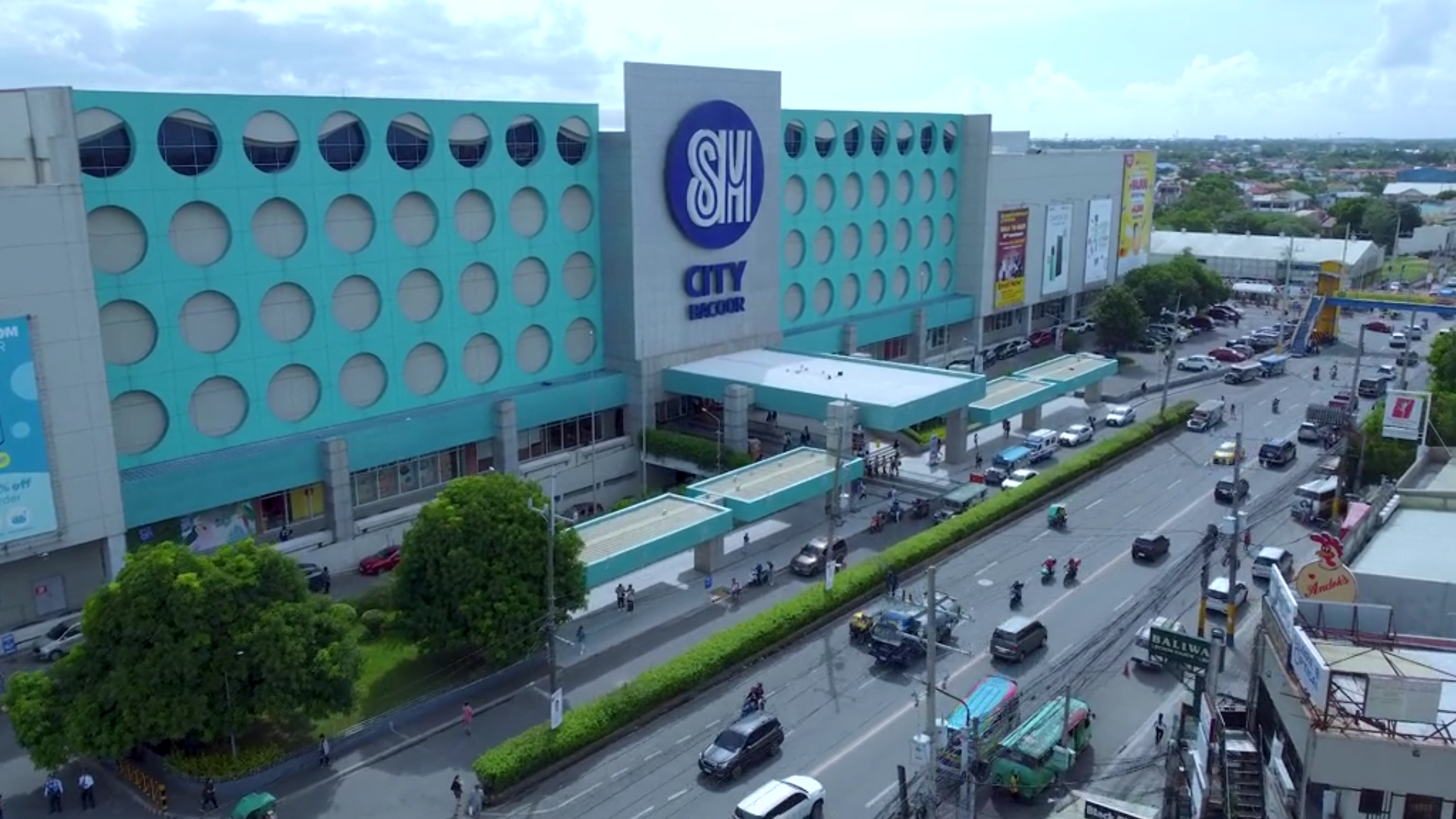
- Facade of SM City Bacoor in October 2024
- Location: Bacoor, Cavite Philippines
- Coordinates: 14°26′42″N 120°57′03″E
- Address: Barangay Habay, Gen. Emilio Aguinaldo Highway, cor Tirona Highway, Bacoor, 4102 Cavite
- Opened: July 25, 1997; 29 years ago
- Developer: SM Prime Holdings
- Manager: SM Prime Holdings
- Floor area: 120,202 m^{2} (1,293,840 sq ft)
- Public transit: 27 PITX/Lawton 29 PITX/Lawton
- Website: SM City Bacoor

SM City Bacoor is a shopping mall owned and operated by SM Prime Holdings. Opened in 1997, it is the first SM Supermall in the entire Luzon region outside of Metro Manila, as well as the first SM mall established in the province of Cavite. The five-level commercial complex has a gross floor area (GFA) of 120,202 square meters.

== History ==
SM City Bacoor in 2015 facing Tirona Highway

SM City Bacoor officially opened to the public in 1997, marking the initial expansion of SM Supermalls into provincial regions outside the capital. It is a part of the SM mall triplets designed by Palafox and Associates, a concept that was employed by SM at the height of the 1997 Asian financial crisis, of building three shopping malls in different areas under one design template. Thus, the mall's exterior facade and interior has similarities to SM City Fairview and SM City Iloilo.

On April 30, 2007, President Gloria Macapagal Arroyo signed Proclamation No. 1283, officially designating SM City Bacoor as an Information Technology Center. Pursuant to Republic Act No. 7916 (the Special Economic Zone Act of 1995), as amended by Republic Act No. 8748, this executive issuance granted special economic zone status to the mall's designated tech and office spaces under the management of the Philippine Economic Zone Authority (PEZA).

In May 2021, the mall transitioned toward renewable energy infrastructure by installing a solar power system. Partnering with Solar Philippines, SM Prime Holdings deployed 3,142 solar panels on the mall's roof deck, generating a total capacity of 1.3 megawatts to supply a portion of the complex's peak electricity requirements.

== Features ==
The commercial complex consists of five levels accommodating retail, dining, and entertainment facilities. The primary anchor tenants include The SM Store, SM Supermarket, Ace Hardware, and the SM Appliance Center. For recreation and entertainment, the mall houses a dedicated food court, amusement centers, and an eight-screen cinema complex.

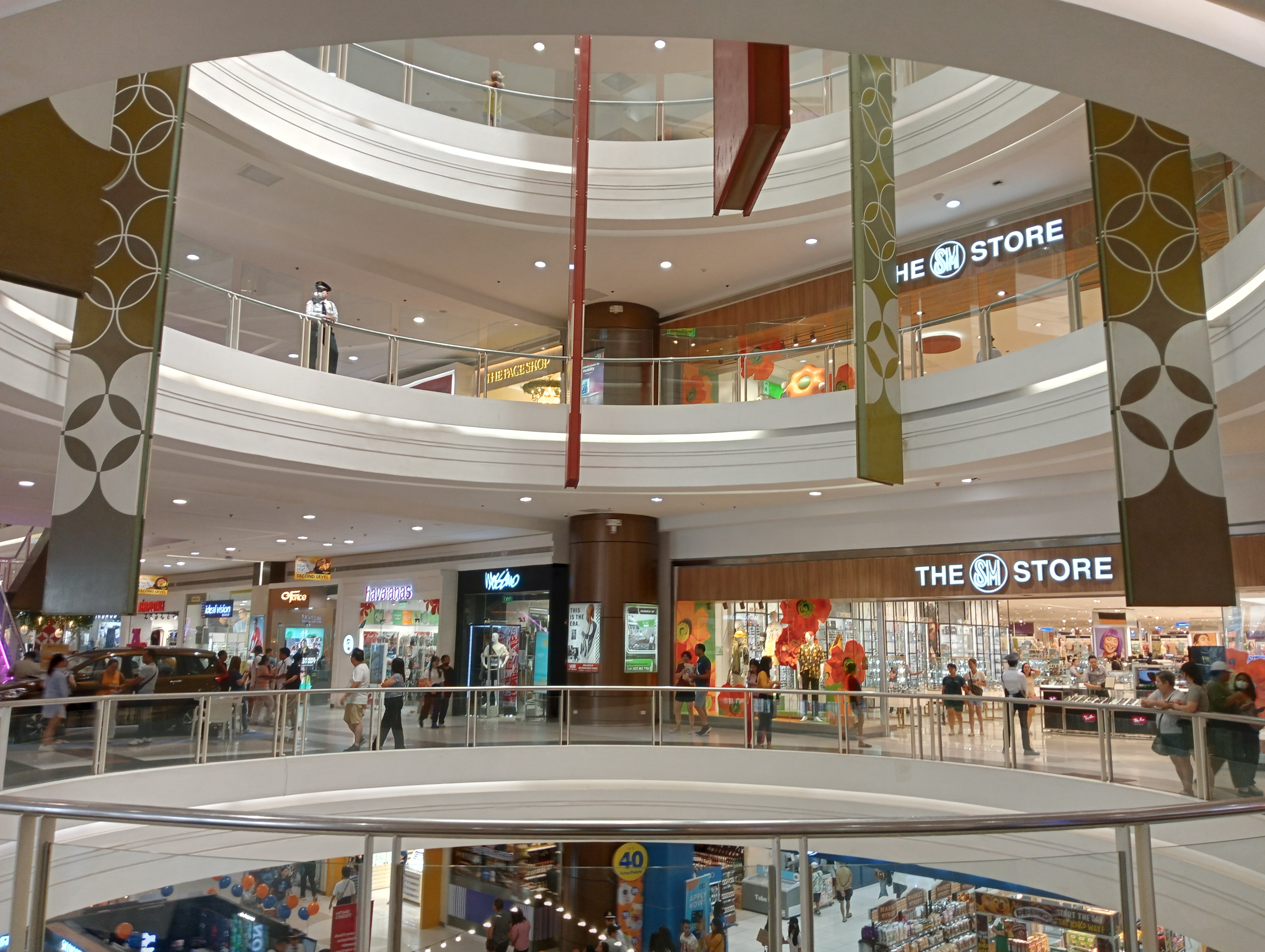
SM City Bacoor interior, 2024

The property is situated at the intersection of General Emilio Aguinaldo Highway and Tirona Highway in Barangay Habay II, Bacoor City, Cavite. To facilitate regional commuters, the complex features dedicated transport terminals that service public utility vehicles traveling across Cavite and neighboring locations in Metro Manila.

== Incidents ==
On August 29, 2017, a massive crowd gathered at the mall due to a localized promotional event offering discounted burgers at Zark's Burgers. The high volume of customers caused a rush at the entrance gates, leading to a minor stampede. Mall security and local authorities intervened to disperse the crowd and manage the congestion; no severe injuries were reported.

== Future development ==
In late 2023, discussions were held between the city government of Bacoor, led by Mayor Strike B. Revilla, and executives from SM Prime Holdings regarding long-term infrastructure and commercial footprint expansions within the city. The consultation covered plans for future commercial projects, including preliminary logistical assessments for a projected third SM mall branch within the jurisdiction of Bacoor City.

== See also ==
- SM City Dasmariñas
- SM City Tanza
- SM Supermalls

Preceded by SM Southmall	6th SM Supermall; 1997	Succeeded by SM City Fairview
