= Teresita Sy-Coson =

Filipino businesswoman

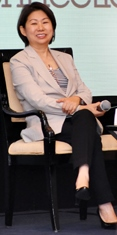
- Teresita Sy-Coson (2012)
- Born: Teresita Tan Sy; October 1950 (age 75–76); Plaridel, Bulacan, Philippines
- Education: Immaculate Conception Academy–Greenhills; Assumption College San Lorenzo
- Occupations: Vice Chairperson - SM Investments Corporation; Chairwoman - BDO Unibank
- Years active: 1977
- Spouse: Louis Coson (d. 2003)
- Children: 3
- Father: Henry Sy (d. 2019)

Teresita "Tessie" Tan Sy-Coson (born October 1950) is a Filipino businesswoman, the daughter of Henry Sy. The vice chairwoman of SM Investments Corporation (SMIC)—one of the Philippines' largest publicly traded holding companies with interests in retail, banking, property and portfolio investments, She is also the chairwoman of BDO Unibank, Inc. (BDO), the Philippines' largest bank in terms of total resources, capital, loans, total deposits, and assets-under-management as of the end of 2015. She is one of the billionaires included in Forbes magazine's 50 richest people in the Philippines in 2020.

== Career ==
Apart from these two key positions, Sy-Coson also holds important board and management positions in various subsidiaries and affiliates of BDO and the SM Group. These include BDO Private Bank, Inc.; BDO Leasing and Finance, Inc.; BDO Capital & Investment Corporation; and BDO Foundation, Inc. For the SM Group side, she is an integral figure as adviser to the Board of SM Prime Holdings, Inc. She is also part of the three-member Philippine delegation to the ASEAN Business Advisory Council (ABAC), an organization formed in 2003 by the leaders of ASEAN to provide private sector feedback and guidance to boost the alliance's efforts towards economic integration.

== Awards and recognition ==
Over the years, Sy-Coson has been a recipient of various awards in recognition of her leadership in the banking and retail sectors.

These recognitions include an Asia's Best CEO award and an Asian Corporate Director of the Year award, both from Corporate Governance Asia; being named 2012's Best Retail Banker of the Year by The Asian Banker; being listed in Fortune magazine's 50 Most Powerful Women in the World from 2001 to 2010; being included in Forbes Asia's list of the 50 Power Business Women; and being a recipient of the Philippine Retailers Association (PRA) President's Award in 2014.

== Personal life ==
She was married to a Filipino Chinese businessman Louis Coson, until his death in 2003.
