= Henry Sy =

Filipino business magnate (1924–2019)

- 施至成
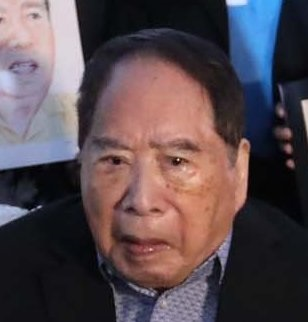
- Sy in 2017
- Born: Sy Chi Sieng (Shī Zhìchéng); October 15, 1924; Jinjiang, Fukien, Republic of China
- Died: January 19, 2019 (aged 94); Makati, Philippines
- Resting place: Heritage Park; Taguig, Metro Manila, Philippines
- Education: Chiang Kai Shek College; Far Eastern University (AA)
- Occupation: Businessman
- Known for: Founder of SM Investments
- Spouse: Felicidad Tan
- Children: 6, including Teresita Sy-Coson

Chinese name
- Traditional Chinese: 施至成
- Simplified Chinese: 施至成
Transcriptions
Standard Mandarin
- Hanyu Pinyin: Shī Zhìchéng
- Bopomofo: ㄕ ㄓˋ ㄔㄥˊ
- Wade–Giles: Shih^{1} Chih^{4}-chʻeng^{2}
- Tongyong Pinyin: Shih Jhìh-chéng
- IPA: [ʂɻ̩́ ʈʂɻ̩̂.ʈʂʰə̌ŋ]
Southern Min
- Hokkien POJ: Si Chì-sêng

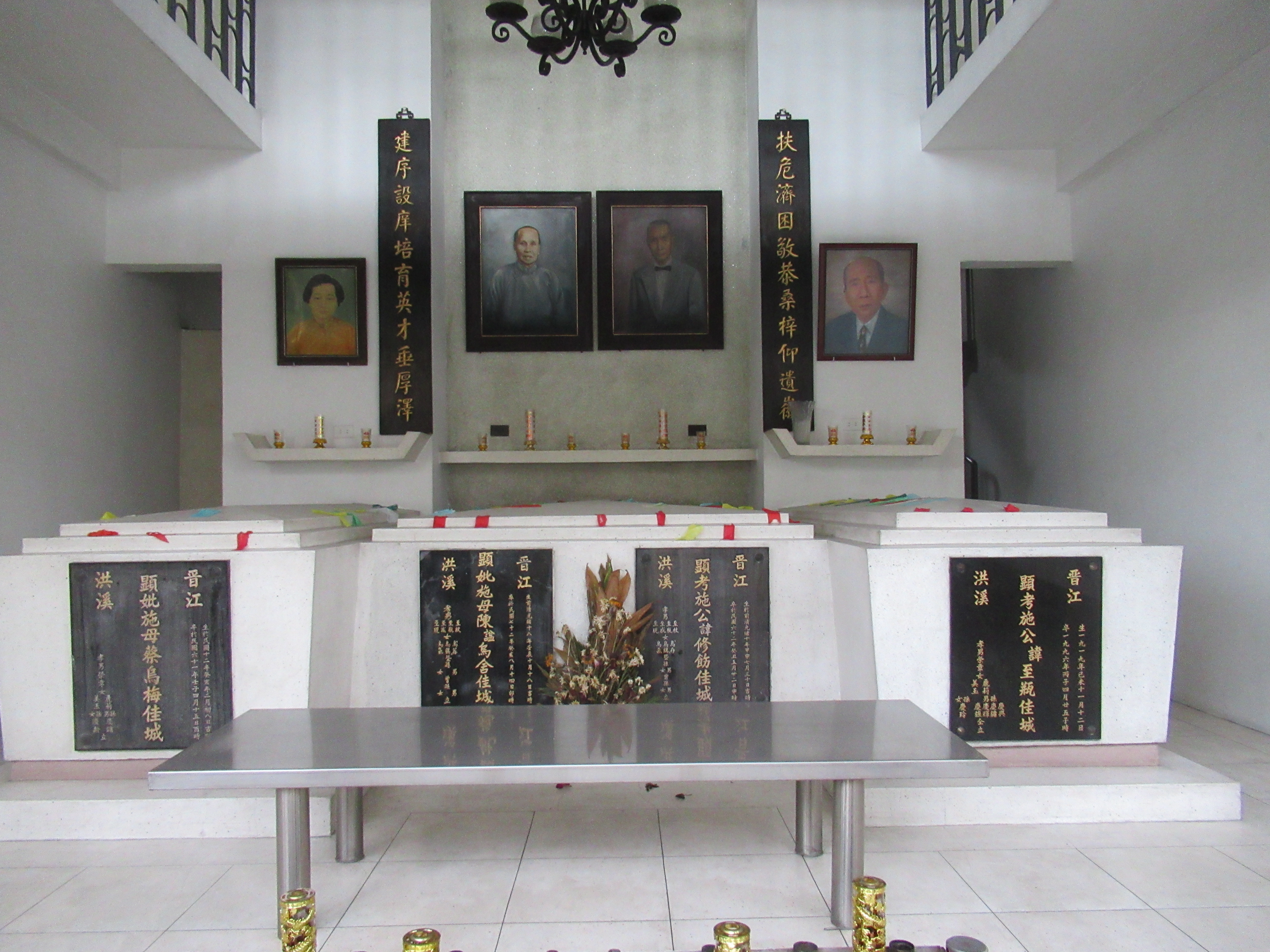
Henry H. Sy and Tan O Sia - Adrian Sy & Encarnacion Sy (Garcia) Mausoleum, Manila Chinese Cemetery

Henry Tan Sy Sr. (/siː/; Chinese: 施至成; Pe̍h-ōe-jī: Si Chì-sêng; pinyin: Shī Zhìchéng; Zhuyin Fuhao: ㄕ ㄓˋ ㄔㄥˊ; October 15, 1924 – January 19, 2019) was a Filipino businessman.

Born in Fujian, he moved with his family to the Philippines at age 12. His family would later return to China, with Henry staying behind to establish ShoeMart, a small Manila shoe store, in 1958. Over the decades he developed ShoeMart into SM Investments, one of the largest conglomerates in the Philippines, including 49 SM malls in the Philippines and China, 62 department stores, 56 supermarkets and over 200 grocery stores. SM also owns Banco de Oro, the largest bank in the Philippines, as well as real estate holdings.

For eleven straight years until his death, Sy was named by Forbes as the richest person in the Philippines. When he died, his net worth was estimated at US$19 billion.

== Early life and education ==
Henry Sy, also known as Sy Chi Sieng in Philippine Hokkien (Shī Zhìchéng in Mandarin), was born in Jinjiang in Fujian, then still under the Republic of China (ROC), on October 15, 1924. At age 12, he and his family moved to the Philippines during the Commonwealth Era in the American colonial period, where his father set up a shop that sold various household items. At his father's store, Sy helped his father sell rice, sardines and other items. During World War II, the store was obliterated along with the rest of the capital during the 1945 Battle of Manila. His family decided to return to China, but Sy stayed in the Philippines, where he completed his secondary education at an institution now known as the Chiang Kai Shek College in Tondo, Manila, and earned his Associate of Arts degree in commercial studies at Far Eastern University in 1950. At school, he learned English and Filipino (Tagalog).

== Career ==
In his twenties, Sy became a store manager working for an American business involved in the local shoe industry in the Philippines; he opened his first sole-proprietorship store in Quiapo, Manila in 1948. He opened at least three shoe stores in the Carriedo area which was then known for its heavy pedestrian traffic. His decision to sell shoes was due to the losses his family experienced in World War II thinking that everyone would need shoes in the aftermath of the war.

He sold surplus G.I. boots, bankrolled the profits and was able to secure credit (like ₱1 million/US$500,000 from Chinabank in 1949 when US$1=₱2, roughly ₱385.17 million in 2024 when US$=~₱56.91, adjusted for inflation of the US dollar) prior to establishing Shoemart in 1958, his own small shoe store in Quiapo, which marked the beginnings of SM Prime. He later encountered difficulties in sourcing shoes locally and decided to import shoes from outside the country.

Sy became involved in the Filipino banking industry when he acquired Acme Savings Bank (later renamed Banco de Oro or BDO) in 1967.

In November 1972, he opened SM Quiapo, SM's first standalone department store, and entrusted his 22-year-old daughter Teresita to run the store. On November 8, 1985, he established his first SM Supermall, SM City North EDSA. In the early 1990s, SM expanded with two malls in Metro Manila and a one in Cebu City. SM Prime Holdings was incorporated in 1994 and went public.

Sy was named "Richest Man of the Year" by the Makati Business Club in 1999 and was conferred an Honorary Doctorate in Business Management by De La Salle University in January of that year. He and his wife Felicidad established the SM Foundation Inc., which helps underprivileged youths, the disabled and the elderly. He established business presence in mainland China when the SM Group opened its first shopping mall in his native Xiamen. Other malls were later set up in other parts of Southern China.

Sy in 2009

In August 2005, Sy's stake in the San Miguel Corporation, Southeast Asia's largest food and beverage conglomerate, reached 11%. He sold that stake in October 2007 for $680 million.

Sy's holding company, SM Investments (also known as SM Group), has been frequently named as one of the best managed companies in the Philippines. SM Investments is the operator of Banco de Oro (BDO) and owner of Chinabank. In 2006, Sy bought the remaining 66% of Equitable PCI Bank, the Philippines' third largest lender, and merged it into BDO the following year. The transaction turned BDO into the second largest financial company in the country.

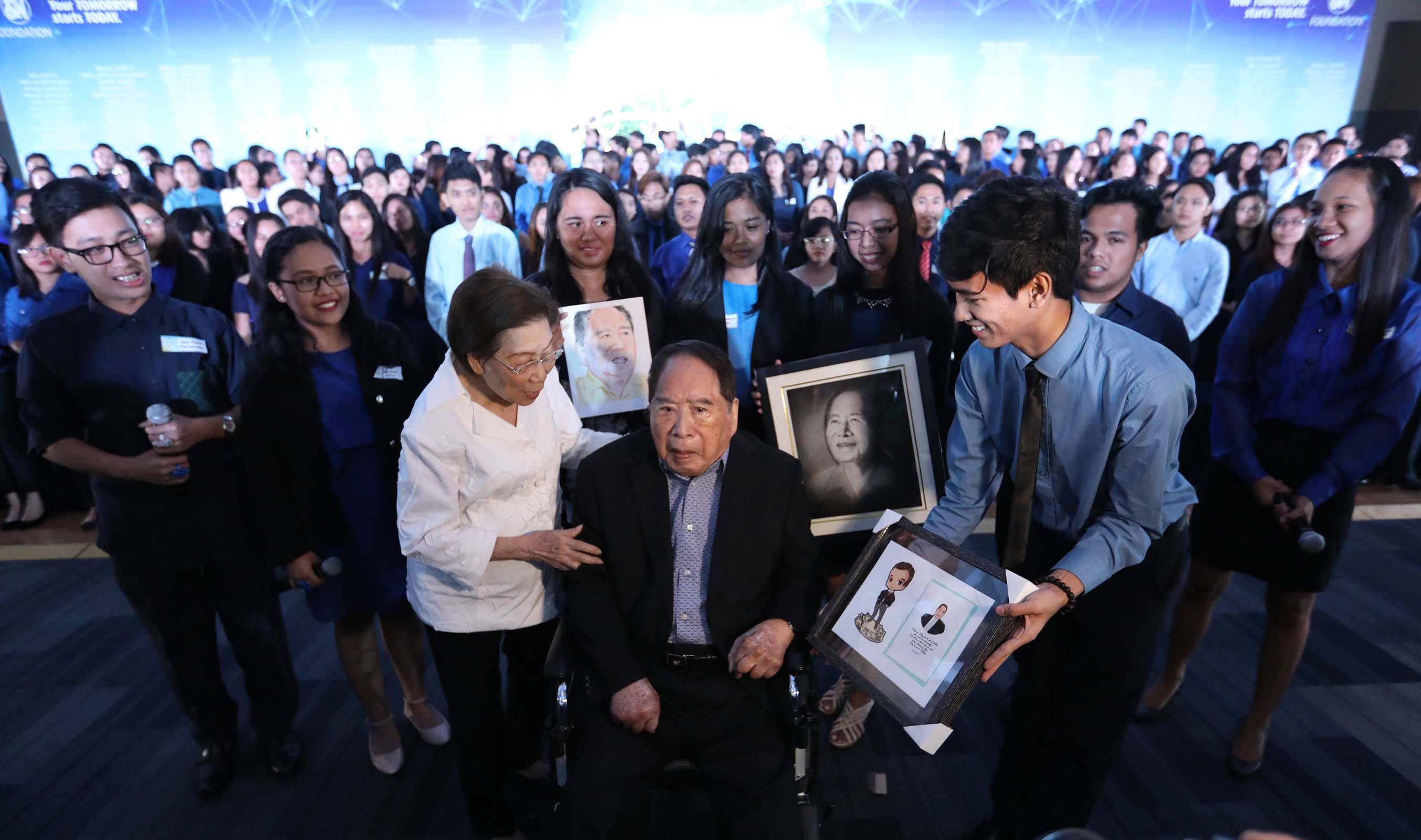
Sy during the SM Scholar Graduates Batch of 2017

In 2017, Sy stepped down as chairman of SM Investments Corporation and was given the honorary title of Chairman Emeritus as recognition for being the founder of the SM Group. Jose Sio succeeded Sy as chairman.

He was the Philippines' richest man, gaining $5 billion in 2010, after the 2008 financial crisis. The huge gain was due to his holding company, SM Investments, which possessed interests in BDO, inter alia. For 11 straight years until his death in 2019, Forbes ranked him as the richest person in the Philippines, with an estimated net worth of US$19 billion in 2019.

== Personal life ==
Sy was married to Felicidad Tan, who was a shoelace vendor. The couple had six children: Teresita, Elizabeth, Henry Jr., Hans, Herbert, and Harley. Teresita and Henry Jr. are vice chairpersons of SM Investments, under chairman Jose Sio, a longtime lieutenant of Henry Sr. Harley is executive director of SM.

Sy had several grandchildren, including the deceased Jan Catherine Sy, from his son Henry Jr.

== Death and legacy ==
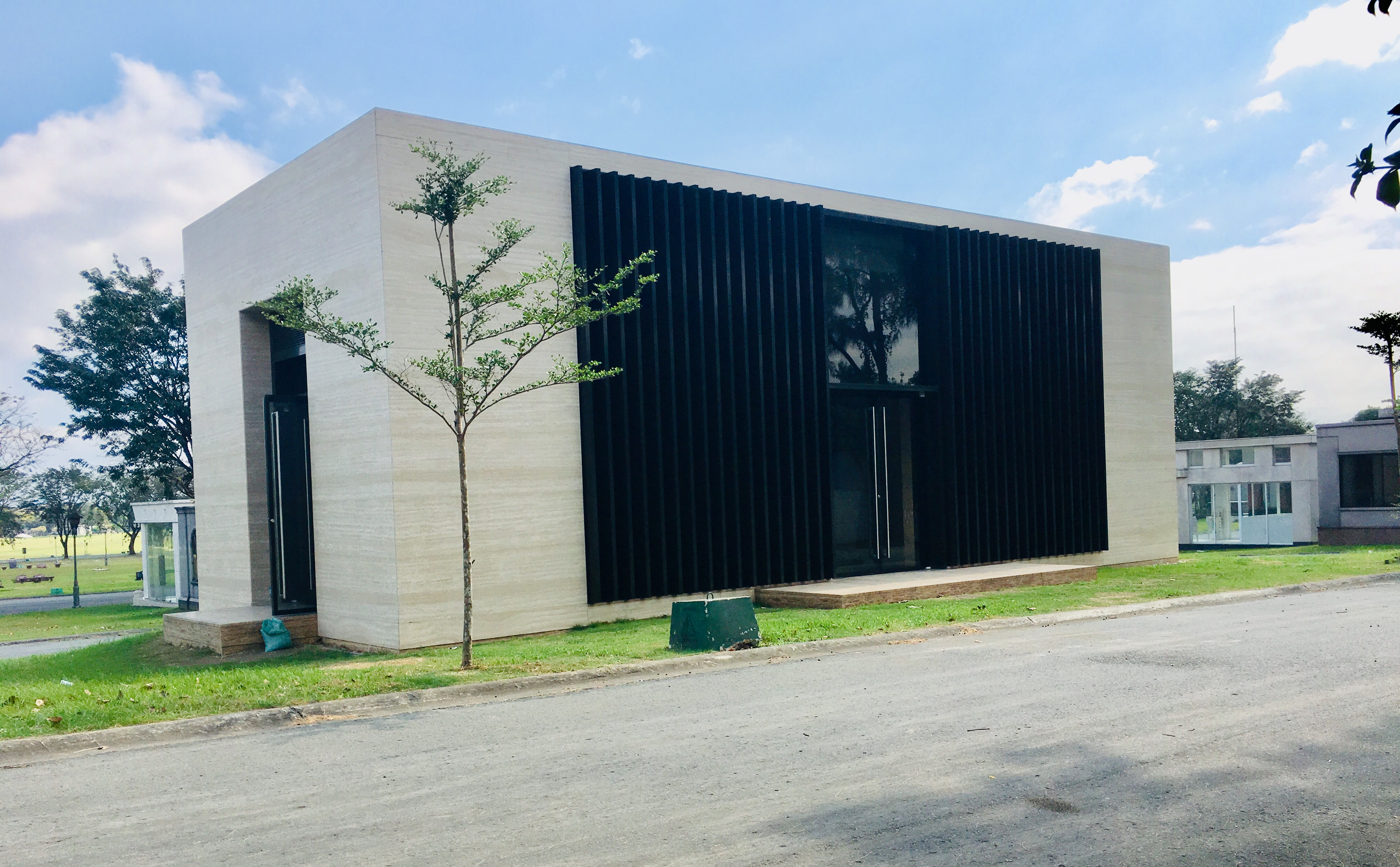
Tomb at the Heritage Memorial Park, Fort Bonifacio, Taguig, Metro Manila

Sy died in his sleep on January 19, 2019, aged 94. He was discovered on the morning of that day, in his home in Forbes Park, Makati. The interment took place at the Heritage Memorial Park in Taguig, on January 24.

The Henry Sy Sr. Hall inside the University of Santo Tomas campus was inaugurated on September 28, 2024, by the SM Foundation to commemorate Sy Sr.’s centennial.
