= SM Retail =

Philippine retail holding company

SM Retail Inc.
- Type: Subsidiary
- Industry: Retail, wholesale
- Headquarters: SM Retail Headquarters Complex; Sunrise Drive Cor. Bayshore Ave., JW Diokno Blvd., Mall of Asia Complex, Pasay City, Philippines
- Key people: Teresita Sy-Coson (Chairperson)
- Revenue: ▲ ₱276.5 billion (2016)
- Net income: ▲ ₱10.6 billion (2016)
- Parent: SM Investments Corporation
- Website: sminvestments.com/retail

SM Retail Inc. is a retail holding company based in Pasay, Philippines. It is a subsidiary of the conglomerate SM Investments Corporation. SM Retail has been a member of the International Association of Department Stores since 2009.

== History ==
The company was founded by Henry Sy, Sr. on January 15, 1960. Initially, he named his business Shoemart and focused on buying large supplies of shoes from the United States. His business grew until he was able to open a department store. He named his second company SM Department Store Inc.

In 2006, the board of directors of the SM Investments Corporation announced that it will undergo a corporate restructuring. Under the restructuring, two companies were established: SM Retail Inc. and SM Land Inc. The SM Supermarket, SM Hypermarket, and SM Department Store (now SM Store) retail chains were placed under the ownership of SM Retail while SM Land Inc. is responsible for managing the real estate assets of the parent corporation. SM Prime Holdings remains the sole operator of the SM Groups' SM Supermalls shopping mall chain (SM Prime later bought out and merged SM Group's land property division (SM Land) in 2013, which owns SM Development Corporation, Highlands Prime, Inc., SM Hotels and Convention and SM Commercial Properties Group). In 2016, SM Retail through Macquarie Capital underwent a merger with various local retailers.

== Retail brands ==
SM Retail has ownership over SM Supermarket, SM Hypermarket and Savemore chains which would later be called collectively as SM Markets. It also owns SM Store department stores and food retail stores under Walter Mart and Alfamart (joint venture between SM and the Indonesian-based mini-mart/convenience store chain for Philippine franchise).

Since the company underwent a merger in February 2016 with various local retail companies, SM Retail has ownership over other retail brands such as Ace Hardware, SM Appliance Center, Homeworld, Our Home, Toy Kingdom, Watsons, Kultura, Baby Company, Sports Central, and Pet Express. It also has majority stakes in the local operations of Alfamart, Forever 21, and Crate & Barrel.

== Gallery ==
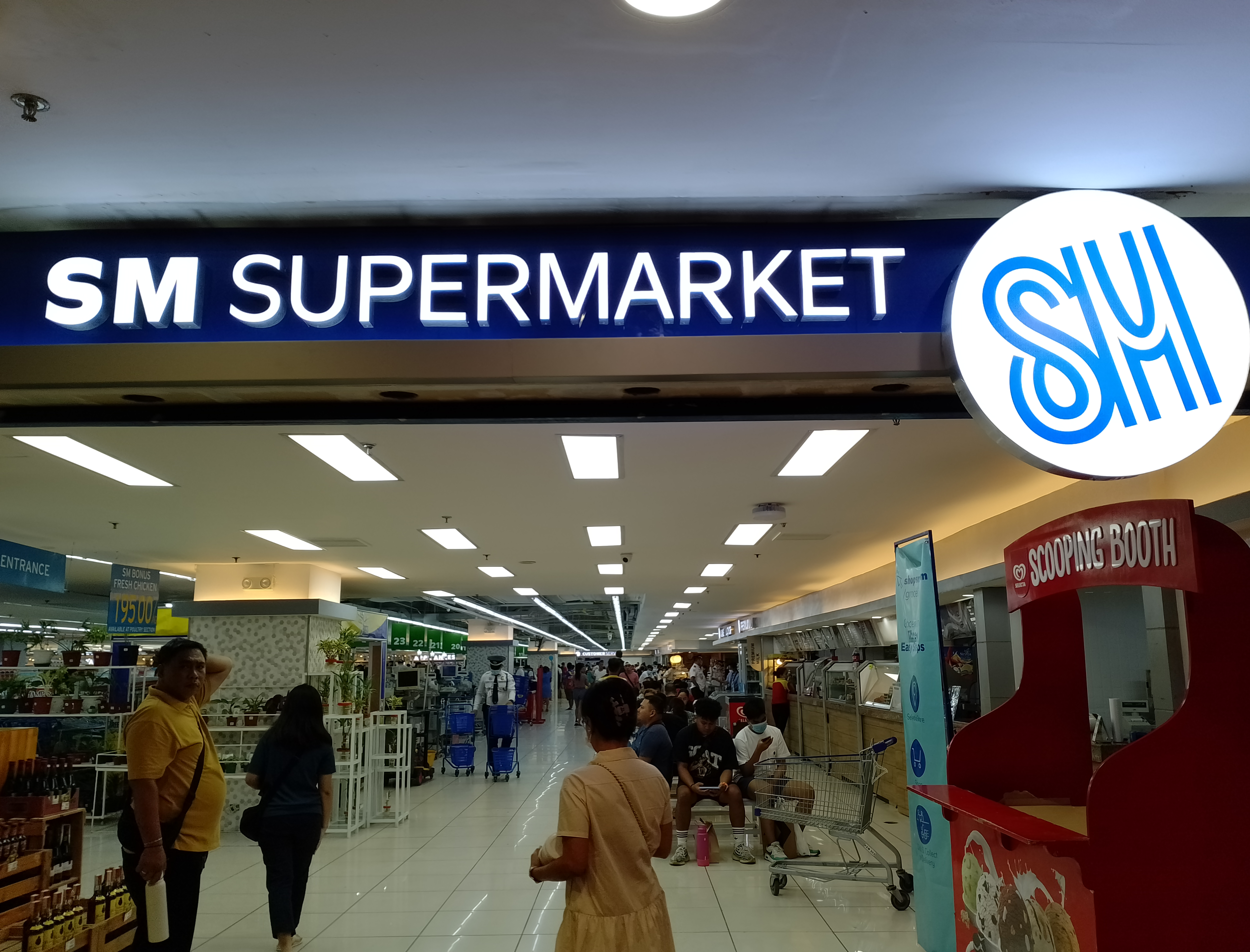
SM Supermarket branch at SM City Cebu

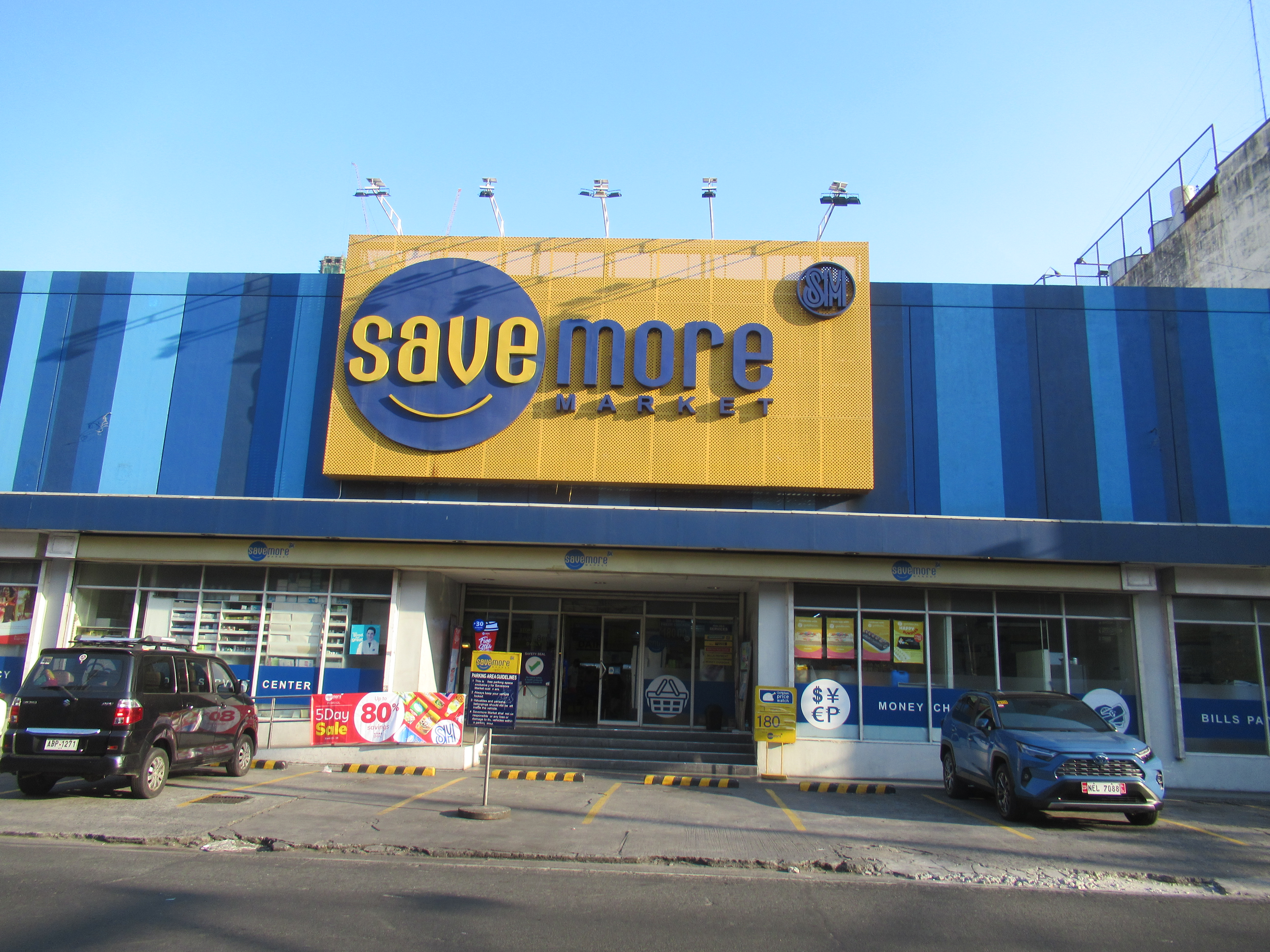
Savemore Market branch in Malate, Manila

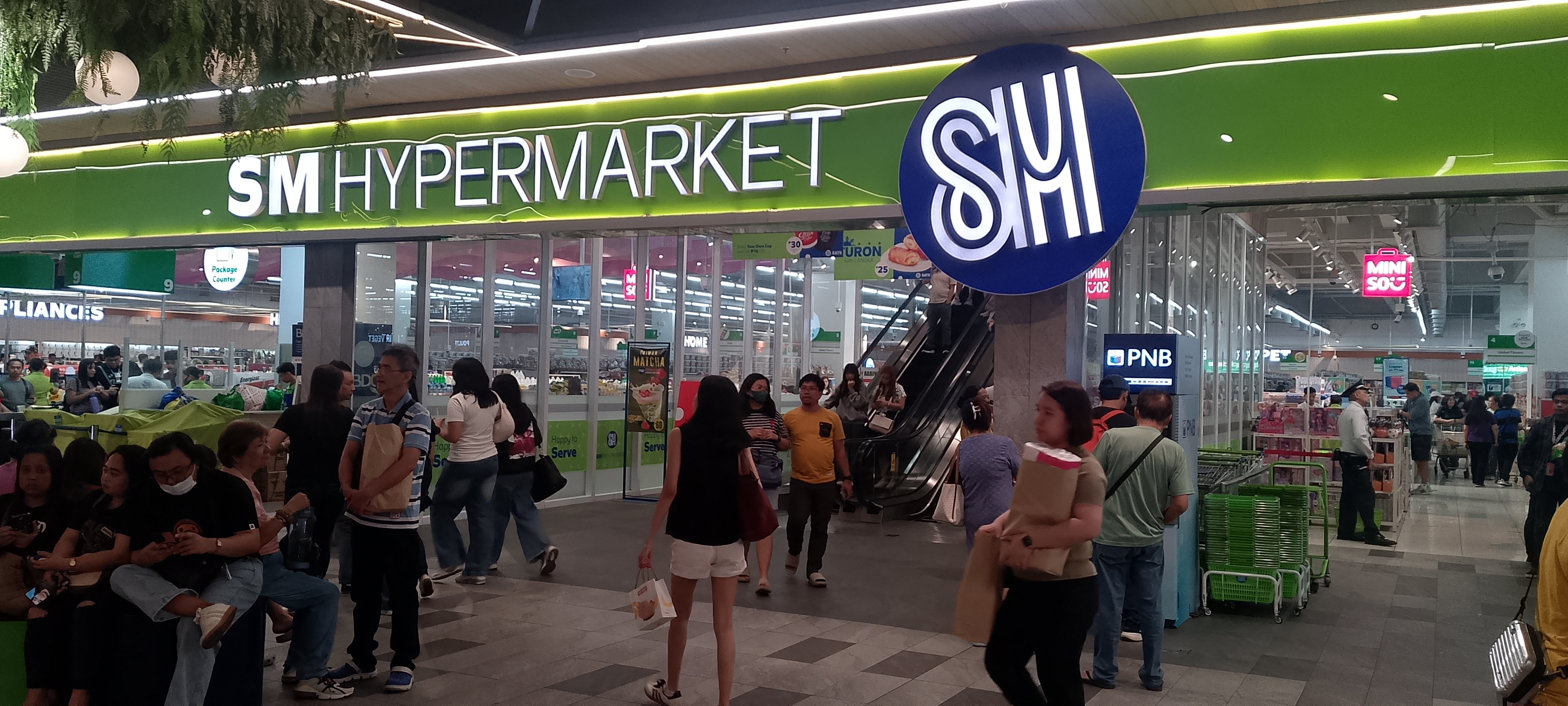
SM Hypermarket branch at SM North EDSA
