= SM Investments =

Philippine conglomerate

SM Investments Corporation
- Type: Public
- Traded as: PSE: SM
- Industry: Conglomerate
- Founded: February 6, 1958; 68 years ago, in Manila, Philippines
- Founder: Henry Sy
- Headquarters: 10th Floor, One E-Com Center, Harbor Drive Mall of Asia Complex, CBP-IA, Pasay, Philippines
- Area served: Philippines
- Key people: Amando Tetangco Jr. (Chairman); Teresita Sy-Coson (Vice Chairperson); Henry Sy Jr. (Vice Chairman); Frederick Dy Buncio (President and CEO)
- Owners: Sy family (43.69%)
- Subsidiaries: SM Prime Holdings; SM Retail; SM Land; BDO Unibank and other subsidiaries
- Website: sminvestments.com

SM Investments Corporation (SMIC), also known as SM Group, is a Filipino conglomerate with interests in various sectors, mostly in shopping mall development and management, retail, real estate development, banking, and tourism. Founded by Henry Sy, it has become one of the largest conglomerates in the Philippines, being the country's dominant player in retail with 208 stores nationwide. Of these, 47 are SM Department Stores; 38 are SM Supermarkets; 37 are SM Hypermarkets, and 86 are SaveMore branches.

It is the largest company in the Philippines in terms of market capitalization, and has repeatedly ranked as the top Philippine company in the Forbes Global 2000.

== History ==
In 1958, Henry Sy Sr. started his first company, ShoeMart (SM), a small shoe store in Carriedo, Manila, Philippines. He initially focused on buying large supplies of shoes from the United States. His business expanded as he transformed his shoe store into a department store.

At this point, Sy set up his second company, SM Department Store Inc., and began selling stocks to department stores. In 1978, he began buying supermarkets at the northern end of EDSA in Quezon City. During the 90s when he opened SM Megamall, his companies were listed in the Philippine Stock Exchange, SM Prime Holdings Inc. By 2005, the SM Investments Corporation was inaugurated.

In April 2017, SMIC appointed Jose Sio as CEO.

== Subsidiaries ==
=== Retail ===
- SM Markets – a chain of food retail stores consisting of SM Supermarket, SM Hypermarket and Savemore.
- SM Store – a department store
- Walter Mart – a shopping mall owned by a joint venture between SM and a local company.
- Alfamart – a convenience store owned by a joint venture between SM and an Indonesian company.
- Mindpro - a Zamboanga-based retail company that operates Mindpro Supermarket, and 30% of SM City Mindpro.
- Specialty Stores – SM operates leading local retail chains such as Ace Hardware, SM Appliances, Homeworld, Our Home, Toy Kingdom (International Toyworld Inc.), Kultura, Baby Company, Sports Central, Pet Express, Miniso, Watsons, Uniqlo, etc.
- Gentree Fund – a venture capital fund investing in early-stage all the way to pre-IPO companies.

=== Banking ===
- BDO Unibank – one of the largest banks in the Philippines
- ChinaBank – the first privately owned local commercial bank in the Philippines – (SM owns 30% of the company)

=== Property ===
- SM Supermalls – operated by its subsidiary, SM Prime Holdings.
- SM Development Corporation (SMDC) – is a residential property developer which focuses on the premium middle market.
- Mall of Asia Complex – is an alternative business and tourism district, as well as the home of the SM Mall of Asia, SMX Convention Center (the largest private venue in the Philippines), E-com Center and SM Mall of Asia Arena (one of the largest private sports venues in the Philippines). The Mall of Asia Complex occupies 60 hectares of land along the coast of Manila Bay, offering locations for business, tourism, retail, and leisure projects.
- OCLP Holdings – the parent of Ortigas & Company Limited Partnership. Since November 2014, the consortium of SM Investments and the family of Francisco Ortigas has owned 37% of the holding.
- NEO Group - the owner, developer and manager of several office buildings located in Bonifacio Global City. SM partnered with the company in 2013.

=== Lifestyle Entertainment ===
- SM Cinema – includes Director's Club Cinema, IMAX Theatre, WM Cinemas, Blink, ePlus, and Snack Time.
- SM Skating
- SM Game Park
- SM Tickets
- SM Mall of Asia Arena - is a venue which hosts concerts and other big events, opened on June 16, 2012. Its seating capacity is 16,000 and it hosted the 2013 FIBA Asia Championship. It is one of the largest arenas in the Philippines.
- SM Arena Seaside Cebu - the company's second arena is located in Cebu City. Plans for the arena were first made in 2013, but were reportedly canceled in 2017, but were eventually resumed later on. The arena is slated to open by 2026.
- SM Food Court
- SM Appliance Center

=== Leisure ===
- Costa del Hamilo Inc – is a large-scale eco-tourism project to develop in phases 5,700 hectares of land by the sea in Nasugbu, Batangas into a network of coastal resort communities.
- Highlands Prime, Inc. – is a residential developer in Tagaytay Highlands, a mountainside resort and residential complex.

=== Mining ===
- Atlas Consolidated Mining and Development Corporation – is engaged in gold mining operations.

=== Hotels and Convention Centers ===
- SM Hotels
  - Conrad Manila in Pasay
  - Taal Vista Hotel in Tagaytay City
  - Pico Sands Hotel in Nasugbu
  - Pico de Loro
  - Radisson Blu Hotel in Cebu
  - Park Inn by Radisson in Davao
  - Park Inn by Radisson in Clark
  - Park Inn by Radisson in North Edsa
  - Park Inn by Radisson in Iloilo
- SMX Convention Center (SMX) is a convention center used for hosting conventions, seminars, and conferences.
  - SM Mall of Asia complex in Pasay
  - SM Lanang in Davao City
  - SM Aura in Taguig City
  - SM City Bacolod
  - SM Seaside City
  - SM City Clark
  - Megatrade Hall in Mandaluyong
  - Cebu Trade Hall in Cebu City

=== Education ===
- National University at Manila – a private non–sectarian coeducational institution in Manila.
- Asia Pacific College – a joint venture between SM and IBM Philippines.

=== Gaming ===
- Belle Corporation is Henry Sy's foray into the gaming industry in the Philippines, hoping to capitalize on the future of Pagcor's entertainment city. It is the developer of leisure and tourism destinations in the country. – (SM owns 27%)

=== Other investments and affiliations ===
- 2GO - supply chain operating in shipping, freight, warehousing and express delivery. - (SM owns 67.2%)
- Airspeed - an express courier company. - (SM owns 51%)
- Atlas Consolidated Mining and Development Corporation - mining company with significant holdings of Philippine mineral resources. - (SM owns 34.1%)
- CityMall - commercial centers owned by a joint venture between SM and DoubleDragon Properties Corp. - (SM owns 34%)
- Goldilocks - a leading Filipino bakeshop heritage brand trusted by Filipino consumers for over 50 years. - (SM owns 74%)
- MyTown - Dormitories owned by Philippines Urban Living Solutions, Inc. - (SM owns 71.3%)
- National Grid Corporation of the Philippines (NGCP) - privately owned power transmission company established in January 15, 2009 through Republic Act (RA) 9511 that took over from National Transmission Corporation (TransCo) under Department of Energy (DOE) of the Philippine government during the administration of President Gloria Macapagal Arroyo which privatized the Philippine power grid and its related assets and facilities operations, maintenance, management, expansion, construction, and eminent domain of TransCo. It is the temporary owner of grid components and their exact lands or locations, pedestals, and rights-of-ways (ROWs) which are specific portions of a power line acquired and designated since its turnover from TransCo at the said date of January 2009. Assuming it secures a renewal, NGCP has a 50-year concession period from January 15, 2009 to December 1, 2058. It is 30% owned by SM Group (other 30% with Filipino-Chinese businessman Robert Coyiuto), in joint venture with the State Grid Corporation of China (SGCC) which has the rest of constitutionally mandated maximum foreign allowable percentage of 40% of the total voting eligible shareholdings.
- Neo - is the owner, developer, and manager of the Philippines' top certified green buildings located in Bonifacio Global City. - (SM owns 95% in Neo Subsidiaries and 34% in Neo Associates)
- Philippine Geothermal Production Company (PGPC) - geothermal development company owned by Allfirst Equity Holdings (AEH) - (SM owns 100%)

=== Dissolved ===
- Pilipinas Makro - A former warehouse club that most of its locations were converted to SM Hypermarket and SM Savemore.
- Supersale Club - A former annex that was located northeast of the SM North EDSA Complex. (The site of the building is now The North Towers)
- Equitable PCI Bank - A former bank which later merged with BDO.
- Exploreum - a science and technology museum.

== Social involvement ==
SM Foundation

SM Foundation is the corporate responsibility arm of the SM Group of Companies. The foundation has various areas of advocacy: education, scholarship programs, building schools, disaster response, health care, medical missions, mobile clinics, and religious community projects.

SM Cares

SM Cares is a program created to consolidate and coordinate all of SM Prime's corporate social responsibility (CSR) initiatives. Carried out in all SM malls nationwide, SM Cares' CSR projects cover environmental conservation (energy, air and water), and assistance to customers of SM malls with special needs such as the disabled, special children, the elderly and nursing mothers.
