= Santa Rosa =

Santa Rosa is the Italian, Portuguese, and Spanish name for Saint Rose.

Santa Rosa may also refer to:

== Places ==
=== Argentina ===
- Santa Rosa, Mendoza, a city
- Santa Rosa, Tinogasta, Catamarca
- Santa Rosa, Valle Viejo, Catamarca
- Santa Rosa, La Pampa
- Santa Rosa, Salta
- Santa Rosa de Calamuchita, Córdoba
- Santa Rosa de Calchines, Santa Fe
- Santa Rosa de Río Primero, Córdoba
- Santa Rosa Department, Catamarca
- Santa Rosa Department, Mendoza

=== Bolivia ===
- Santa Rosa, Bolivia, a remote rural village in Santa Cruz
- Santa Rosa, Mapiri
- Santa Rosa de Yacuma
- Santa Rosa Municipality, Beni

=== Brazil ===
- Santa Rosa, Rio Grande do Sul
- Santa Rosa, Goiás
- Santa Rosa de Viterbo, São Paulo
- Santa Rosa do Purus (Acre)
- Santa Rosa de Lima, Sergipe
- Santa Rosa da Serra (Minas Gerais)

=== Chile ===
- Santa Rosa, Arauco

=== Colombia ===
- Santa Rosa, Bolívar
- Santa Rosa, Cauca
- Santa Rosa de Osos (Antioquia)
- Santa Rosa de Cabal (Risaralda)
- Santa Rosa de Viterbo, Boyacá
- Santa Rosa del Sur (Bolívar)

=== Costa Rica ===
- Santa Rosa Abajo
- Santa Rosa National Park, site of the 1856 Battle of Santa Rosa

=== Curaçao ===
- Santa Rosa, Curaçao

=== Ecuador ===
- Santa Rosa, El Oro
- Santa Rosa Canton, El Oro Province
- Santa Rosa de Yanamaru, site of a March 2008 Colombian border raid

=== El Salvador ===
- Santa Rosa de Lima
- Santa Rosa Guachipilín

=== Guatemala ===
- Santa Rosa Cuilapa, Santa Rosa
- Santa Rosa de Lima, Santa Rosa
- Santa Rosa Department, Guatemala

=== Guyana ===
- Santa Rosa, Guyana

=== Honduras ===
- Santa Rosa de Aguán, Colón
- Santa Rosa de Copán, Copán

=== Mexico ===
- Santa Rosa Jáuregui, Querétaro
- Santa Rosa, former name of Clarion Island in the Revillagigedo Islands

=== Nicaragua ===
- Santa Rosa del Peñón, León

=== Panama ===
- Santa Rosa, Chiriquí
- Santa Rosa, Colón
- Santa Rosa, Panamá Oeste

=== Paraguay ===
- Santa Rosa, Paraguay or Santa Rosa de Lima, a town and district in Misiones Department
- Santa Rosa, Asunción, a neighbourhood (barrio)
- Santa Rosa del Aguaray a district in the San Pedro Department
- Santa Rosa del Mbutuy a town and district in the Caaguazú department
- Santa Rosa del Monday, a town and district in Alto Paraná Department

=== Peru ===
- Santa Rosa de Yavarí, a town in Loreto
- Santa Rosa District (disambiguation), districts in Peru

=== Philippines ===
- Santa Rosa, Laguna
  - Santa Rosa railway station, Laguna
  - Santa Rosa Integrated Terminal, a bus station
  - SM City Santa Rosa, a shopping mall
- Santa Rosa, Nueva Ecija
- Santa Rosa del Sur, village in Pasacao, Camarines Sur

=== Puerto Rico ===
- Santa Rosa, Guaynabo, Puerto Rico, a barrio in Puerto Rico
- Santa Rosa, Lajas, Puerto Rico, a barrio in Puerto Rico
- Santa Rosa, Utuado, Puerto Rico, a barrio in Puerto Rico

=== Spain ===
- Santa Rosa (Mieres), a parish in Asturias

=== United States ===
- Santa Rosa, Arizona, also known as Kaij Mek
- Santa Rosa, California
- Santa Rosa Valley, California, an unincorporated census-designated place east of Camarillo, California
- Santa Rosa Valley, the eponymous valley in the unincorporated area east of Camarillo, California
- Santa Rosa Island, California, one of the Channel Islands of California
- Santa Rosa Creek in Sonoma County, California
- Santa Rosa Rancheria, an Indian Reservation in Central California
- Santa Rosa Mountains (California), a short mountain range in the Peninsular Ranges system
- Santa Rosa Island, Florida, a barrier island
- Santa Rosa County, Florida
- Santa Rosa, Missouri
- Santa Rosa Range, a mountain range in northern Nevada
- Santa Rosa, New Mexico
- Santa Rosa, Texas, in Cameron County
- Santa Rosa, Starr County, Texas, a census-designated place

=== Uruguay ===
- Santa Rosa, Uruguay, a small city in the Canelones Department

== Other uses ==
- Portuguese galleon Santa Rosa, a Portuguese galleon
- SS Santa Rosa, a list of steamships that share the name Santa Rosa
- Ferryboat Santa Rosa, an American ferry
- "Santa Rosa" (ABBA song), song by ABBA, b-side of "He Is Your Brother" single
- Santa Rosa (Barcelona Metro), a station in Santa Coloma de Gramenet, Spain
- Santa Rosa station (Lima Metro), a station in Lima, Peru
- Santa Rosa (mountain), an Andean peak in Peru
- Santa Rosa Church, Florence, a sanctuary church in Tuscany, Italy
- Santa Rosa Church, Paramaribo, a church in Paramaribo
- Santa Rosa Esporte Clube, a Brazilian soccer club
- Santa Rosa platform, code name for Intel's Centrino platform
- Santa Rosa storm, a storm occurring in the Southern Hemisphere on or around August 30 each year
- Santa Rosa First Peoples Community, an organisation of indigenous people in Trinidad and Tobago
- FM Santa Rosa, a local radio station broadcasting from the city of Pilar, Buenos Aires, Argentina
- Macchina di Santa Rosa, a perennially rebuilt tower in Viterbo, Italy

== See also ==
- Battle of Santa Rosa, an 1856 conflict in Costa Rica
- Battle of Santa Rosa Island, an 1861 American Civil War conflict in Florida
- Saint Rose (disambiguation)
- Santa Rosa Cathedral (disambiguation)
- Santa Rosa Department (disambiguation)
- Santa Rosa Island (disambiguation)
