= SM Estates =

SM Estates (formerly SM Lifestyle Cities), are integrated mixed-used developments of SM Prime Holdings. The Estates combine elements of SM Prime's core segments such shopping malls, residential development, commercial development, hotels and conventions, and leisure areas and resorts. SM Prime plans to develop more "estates" similar to the 60-hectare Mall of Asia Complex in Pasay which will optimize land where premiere malls currently stand. Subsequent Estates are planned for SM City Clark in Angeles City, SM North EDSA, SM Lanang in Davao, SM Southmall and in its rising development SM Seaside City. Disney Store will open at all SM Estates as Mall of Asia opened on September 27, 2024 and soon on North EDSA.

As of end-2019, SM Prime has 10 integrated property developments in Metro Manila and 11 in key provincial cities.

== Branches ==
These SM Estates have shopping malls as their initial and main anchor development. Malls in lifestyle cities are among the biggest in their respective regions and include residential and office spaces, hotels and convention centers.

Locations of SM Estates within Metro Manila and surrounding areas
Locations of SM Estates within the rest of the Philippines; blue pogs denote lifestyle cities in Luzon, orange in Visayas and green in Mindanao.

=== Metro Manila ===
Name	Image	Location	Developments	Mall floor area (m^{2})	Land area
SM Mall of Asia		Jose W. Diokno Boulevard, Bay City, Pasay	SM Mall of Asia, Sea Residences, Shell Residences, Shore Residences, Shore 2 Residences, Mall of Asia Arena, SMX Convention Center, OneE-Com Center, TwoE-com Center, ThreeE-com Center, FourE-com Center, FiveE-com Center, SM By The Bay, Microtel Hotel, Conrad Hotel Manila	589,891	60 hectares
SM North EDSA		EDSA cor. North Avenue, Quezon City	SM North EDSA, Grass Residences, SM Cyber West, Park-Inn Hotel, BPO Office Building (proposed)	498,000	17 hectares
SM City Fairview		Quirino Highway, Brgy. Greater Lagro, Novaliches, Quezon City	SM City Fairview, National University Fairview, Fairview Towers, Trees Residences	312,749	20.2 hectares
SM City Sta. Mesa		Magsaysay Boulevard cor. Gregorio Araneta Avenue, Brgy. Doña Imelda, Quezon City	SM City Sta. Mesa, Mezza Residences	133,894	
SM City Novaliches		Quirino Highway, Brgy. San Bartolome, Novaliches, Quezon City	SM City Novaliches, Vine Residences	60,044	
SM Megamall		EDSA cor. Doña Julia Vargas Avenue, Ortigas Center, Mandaluyong	SM Megamall, Mega Tower, Megatrade Hall	474,225	
SM Southmall		Alabang-Zapote Road, Brgy. Pilar Village, Las Piñas	SM Southmall, South Tower, South Residences, South Residences 2, National University Las Piñas	198,000	20 hectares
SM City Bicutan		Doña Soledad Avenue cor. West Service Road, Brgy. Don Bosco, Parañaque	SM City Bicutan, Bicutan Tower, Spring Residences	113,214	
SM City Sucat		Dr. A. Santos Ave. cor C-5 Road Extension, Brgy. San Dionisio, Parañaque	SM City Sucat, Field Residences	96,277	
SM Aura		McKinley Parkway, Bonifacio Global City, Taguig	SM Aura, SM Aura Tower, SMX Aura	198,257	

=== Luzon ===
Name	Image	Location	Developments	Mall floor area (m^{2})	Land area
SM City Clark		Manuel A. Roxas Highway, Brgy. Malabanias, Angeles City	SM City Clark, Park Inn Clark, SMX Clark, Tech Hub Buildings, SM Grand Terminal Clark, Skyline	308,909	16.5 hectares
SM City Marilao		MacArthur Highway, Brgy. Ibayo, Marilao, Bulacan	SM City Marilao, Cheer Residences	93,910	
SM City Olongapo Central		Rizal Avenue, Brgy. East Tapinac, Olongapo	SM City Olongapo Central, SMX Olongapo	92,345	
SM City Taytay		Manila East Road, Brgy. Dolores, Taytay, Rizal	SM City Taytay, SM BPO Building	97,467	
SM City Trece Martires		Governor's Drive, Trece Martires, Cavite	SM City Trece Martires, Hope Residences	83,783	
SM City Santa Rosa		Manila South Road, Brgy. Tagapo, Santa Rosa, Laguna	SM City Santa Rosa, The Core (BPO Building), Park Residences (under construction), Santa Rosa Integrated Terminal	137,463	17 hectares
SM Nuvali		Santa Rosa–Tagaytay Road, Brgy. Santo Domingo, Santa Rosa, Laguna	SM Nuvali (under construction), NV Tower (under construction), Park Inn (proposed), SMX Santa Rosa (proposed)	190,000	

=== Visayas ===
Name	Image	Location	Developments	Mall floor area (m^{2})	Land area
SM Seaside City		Cebu South Road Properties, Cebu City	SM Seaside City, Sky Hall Seaside Cebu, SM Seaside Arena (under construction), SMX Convention Center Seaside Cebu (under construction)	470,000	32 hectares
SM City Iloilo		Senator Benigno S. Aquino Jr. Avenue, Mandurriao, Iloilo City	SM City Iloilo, SM Strata, Style Residences, National University Iloilo, Park Inn by Radisson Iloilo, SMX Convention Center Iloilo (proposed)	255,918	18 hectares

=== Mindanao ===
Name	Image	Location	Developments	Mall floor area (m^{2})	Land area
SM Lanang		Jose P. Laurel Avenue, Lanang, Davao City	SM Lanang Premier, SMX Davao, Park Inn, Lane Residences	145,174	10 hectares
SM CDO Downtown		Claro M. Recto Avenue cor. Osmena Street, Cagayan de Oro	SM CDO Downtown, SM CDO Downtown Tower (BPO Tower)	169,984	
