= Santa Rosa Department, Argentina =

Santa Rosa Department may refer to one of two departments in Argentina:

- Santa Rosa Department, Catamarca
- Santa Rosa Department, Mendoza

== See also ==
- Santa Rosa (disambiguation)
