= Santa Rosa Cathedral =

Santa Rosa Cathedral or Cathedral of Santa Rosa, or variants thereof, may refer to:

- Santa Rosa Cathedral (California), United States
- Santa Rosa Cathedral (Carúpano), Venezuela
- Santa Rosa Cathedral (La Pampa), Argentina; see Roman Catholic Diocese of Santa Rosa in Argentina
- Santa Rosa de Osos Cathedral, Colombia
- Santa Rosa de Copán Cathedral, Honduras

== See also ==
- Saint Rose (disambiguation) or Santa Rosa
- Santa Rosa (disambiguation)
- St. Rose's Church (disambiguation)
