= Saint Rose =

Saint Rose may refer to:

== People ==
- Saint Rose of Rozoy (1050?-1130)
- Saint Rose of Viterbo (1235–1252)
- Saint Rose of Lima (1586–1617)
- Saint Rose Philippine Duchesne (1759–1862)
- Saint Rose Kim (1784–1839)
- Saint Rose Fan Hui (1855?-1900)
- Saint Rose Chen Aijie (1878?-1900)
- Saint Rose Zhao (1878?-1900)

== Places ==
=== Canada ===
==== Manitoba ====
- Sainte Rose du Lac, Manitoba, a small French-speaking town
  - Ste. Rose du Lac Airport
  - Ste. Rose (electoral district), a provincial electoral division

==== Nova Scotia ====
- St. Rose, Nova Scotia

==== Quebec ====
- Sainte-Rose, Quebec, a former city that is now a district of Laval, Quebec
- Sainte-Rose (electoral district), an electoral district within Laval, Quebec
- Sainte-Rose-de-Watford, Quebec, a municipality
- Sainte-Rose-du-Nord, Quebec, a parish

=== Guadeloupe ===
- Sainte-Rose, Guadeloupe, a commune

=== Réunion ===
- Sainte-Rose, Réunion, a commune in Réunion

=== United States ===
- Saint Rose, Illinois, a village
- St. Rose, Louisiana, a census-designated place in Saint Charles Parish
- St. Rose, Ohio, an unincorporated community
- Saint Rose, Wisconsin, an unincorporated community

== Other uses ==
- College of Saint Rose, in Albany, New York, U.S.
- Saint Rose Academy, a private elementary school in Birmingham, Alabama
- St. Rose Church (disambiguation), various churches
- St. Rose Dominican Hospital – Rose de Lima Campus, in Henderson, Nevada, U.S.
- St. Rose Hospital, in Hayward, California, U.S.
- St. Rose Parish, a men's soccer team that participated in the 1904 Summer Olympics

== See also ==
- Santa Rosa (disambiguation)
- Santa Rosa Cathedral (disambiguation)
