= Santa Rosa Department =

Santa Rosa Department may refer to:

- Santa Rosa Department, Catamarca, Argentina
- Santa Rosa Department, Mendoza, Argentina
- Santa Rosa Department, Guatemala, Guatemala
