= Diocese of Carúpano =

Latin Catholic diocese in Venezuela

Coordinates: 10.6648°N 63.2481°W

Diocese of Carúpano Dioecesis Carupaensis

Catholic

Location
- Country: Venezuela
- Ecclesiastical province: Cumaná

Statistics
- Area: 5,638 km^{2} (2,177 sq mi)
- Population: Total; Catholics: (as of 2004); 432,147; 429,107 (99.3%)

Information
- Denomination: Catholic Church
- Sui iuris church: Latin Church
- Rite: Roman Rite
- Established: 4 April 2000 (26 years ago)
- Cathedral: St. Rose of Lima Cathedral

Current leadership
- Pope: Leo XIV
- Bishop: Jaime Villarroel Rodríguez

Map

The Diocese of Carúpano (Latin: Dioecesis Carupaensis) is a Latin Church diocese of the Catholic Church located in the city of Carúpano in the ecclesiastical province of Cumaná in Venezuela.

== History ==
On 4 April 2000, Pope John Paul II established the Diocese of Carúpano from the Metropolitan Archdiocese of Cumaná.

Many parishioners of the Diocese have died trying to escape from their oppressive economic conditions by boat to Trinidad and Tobago, dozens drowning in the process.

== Ordinaries ==
- Manuel Felipe Díaz Sánchez (4 Apr 2000 – 10 Dec 2008) Appointed, Archbishop of Calabozo
- Jaime José Villarroel Rodríguez (10 Apr 2010 – present)

== See also ==
- Catholic Church in Venezuela
