= Santa Rosa Island =

Santa Rosa Island may refer to:

== Mexico ==
- Clarion Island, formerly Santa Rosa

== Peru ==
- Santa Rosa Island (Amazon River)

== United States ==
- Santa Rosa Island (California), one of the Channel Islands
- Santa Rosa Island (Florida)
  - Battle of Santa Rosa Island, a battle of the American Civil War

== See also ==
- Santa Rosa (disambiguation)
