= St. Rose Church =

St. Rose's Church, Saint Rose of Lima Church, or variations, may refer to:

== Churches ==
=== United States ===
- St. Rose of Lima Church (Newtown, Connecticut)
- St. Rose Priory, in the St. Rose Roman Catholic Church Complex in Springfield, Kentucky
- St. Rose of Lima Catholic Church (Gaithersburg, Maryland)
- St. Rose of Lima Mission, Roman Catholic Church (Silver Lake, Missouri)
- St. Rose of Lima Catholic Church and School Complex, Crofton, Nebraska
- Saint Rose of Lima Catholic Church Reno Nevada
- St. Rose Roman Catholic Church Complex (Lima, New York)
- St. Rose of Lima Church (Manhattan), New York
- St. Rose of Lima Old Church (New York City)
- St. Rose Church (Cincinnati, Ohio)
- St. Rose's Catholic Church (St. Rose, Ohio)
- St. Rose of Lima Roman Catholic Church (Queens), New York.

=== Elsewhere ===
- St. Rose of Lima Parish Church, Santa Rosa, Laguna
- St. Rose of Lima Parish Church, Santa Rosa, Nueva Ecija
- St. Rose Cathedral, Santa Rosa de Copán, Honduras
- St. Rose of Lima Cathedral, Carúpano, Venezuela

== Other ==
- Sainte-Rose-de-Lima, French Guiana, a village

== See also ==
- Santa Rosa Cathedral (disambiguation)
- Rose of Lima
