= Bañado de Ovanta =

- Location in Argentina
- Coordinates: 28°06′S 65°19′W
- Country: Argentina
- Province: Catamarca
- Department: Santa Rosa
- 2nd level Municipality: Bañado de Ovanta
- Founded: 1981
- Elevation: 443 m (1,453 ft)

Population (2001 census [INDEC])
  - Total: 971
- CPA Base: K 4726
- Area code: +54 3833

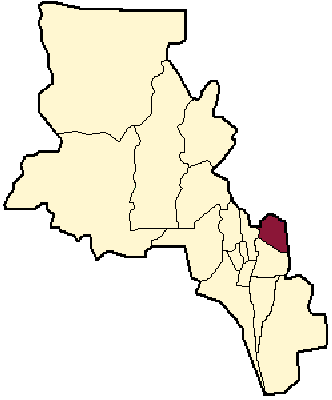
Santa Rosa Department (Catamarca - Argentina)

Bañado de Ovanta is a town in Catamarca Province, Argentina. It is the head town of the Santa Rosa Department. The town was established in 1981 by Provincial decree.
