= SM Southmall =

Shopping mall in Las Piñas, Philippines

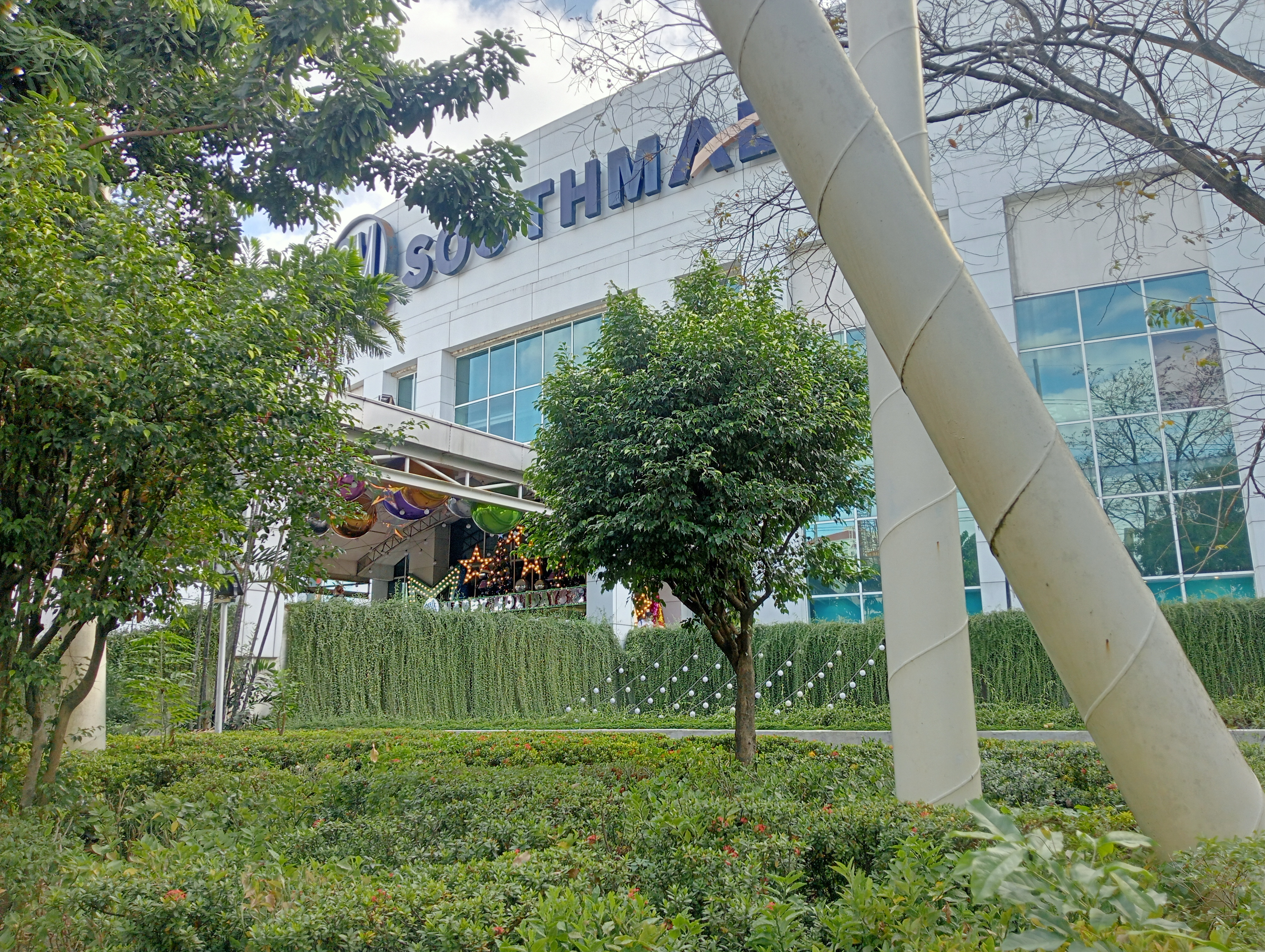
- SM Southmall in 2023; Before Logo Changed.
- Location: Las Piñas, Metro Manila, Philippines
- Coordinates: 14°26′00″N 121°00′38″E
- Address: Alabang–Zapote Road, Almanza Uno
- Opened: April 2, 1995; 31 years ago
- Previous names: SM Southmall Las Piñas
- Developer: SM Prime Holdings
- Manager: SM Prime Holdings
- Num. of stores: 400+
- Num. of anchor tenants: 6
- Floor area: 198,000 m^{2} (2,130,000 sq ft)
- Floors: 4
- Public transit: 24 SM Southmall
- Website: SM Southmall

SM Southmall, formerly known as SM Southmall Las Piñas and SM City Southmall, is a shopping mall in the Philippines, owned and operated by SM Prime Holdings. The mall is located along the Alabang–Zapote Road in Las Piñas. The mall has 200,000 m^{2} (2,200,000 sq ft) of land area, a total floor area of approximately 198,000 m^{2} (2,130,000 sq ft).

== History ==
SM Southmall Las Piñas in 2008

Construction for SM Southmall began in November 1993. The mall later opened on April 2, 1995, and is the first SM Supermall in the southern region of Metro Manila and the 5th SM Supermall ever built by Chinese-Filipino businessman, Henry Sy. It is the second SM Supermall to feature an Ice Skating Rink after SM Megamall.

In March 2010, renovations for SM Southmall began, with many stores on the second floor have closed with some stalls on the sides offering small items on sale. The redevelopment saw a newly refurbished SM Store, which relocated from the center of the mall to the side to accommodate more fashion stores, and the addition of the IMAX cinema which was opened last July 14, 2011. The fashion stores opened in December 2011 along with the grand re-launch in November 2012 (which formally ended the renovation process and declared the mall as a 'premier SM mall').

SM Southmall attracts global retailers including Swedish fashion giant H&M which opened on October 29, 2015, and Uniqlo which opened on November 7, 2014.

Miss World 2013 Megan Young became the new mall brand ambassador as part of the #SeeYouDownSouth campaign on August 7, 2019.

== Features ==
SM Southmall has over 400 shops and service outlets, with six anchor stores. Among the noteworthy features of the mall are its center and south atriums. The center atrium, which once housed a large indoor fountain, is used for events such as concerts and presentations. The mall also features a skating rink at the second level and a bowling center at the lower ground level, that opened in May 2013 and closed in March 2020.

=== Food Street ===
The Food Street which is located at the back of the main mall is a group of restaurants which offers outdoor dining amid plants and an LED-lighted fountain.

=== SM Game Park ===
The SM Game Park is an entertainment facility located at the East Wing of the mall, occupying the original Cinema 4 and opened on December 3, 2021. It features a 14-lane bowling area (relocated from the lower ground floor, which the former space was now a Driftito indoor go-kart center), billiards, archery, table tennis, and a videoke bar. The SM Game Park is also the home of the UFC Gym which opened on June 18, 2022.

=== SM Cinema ===
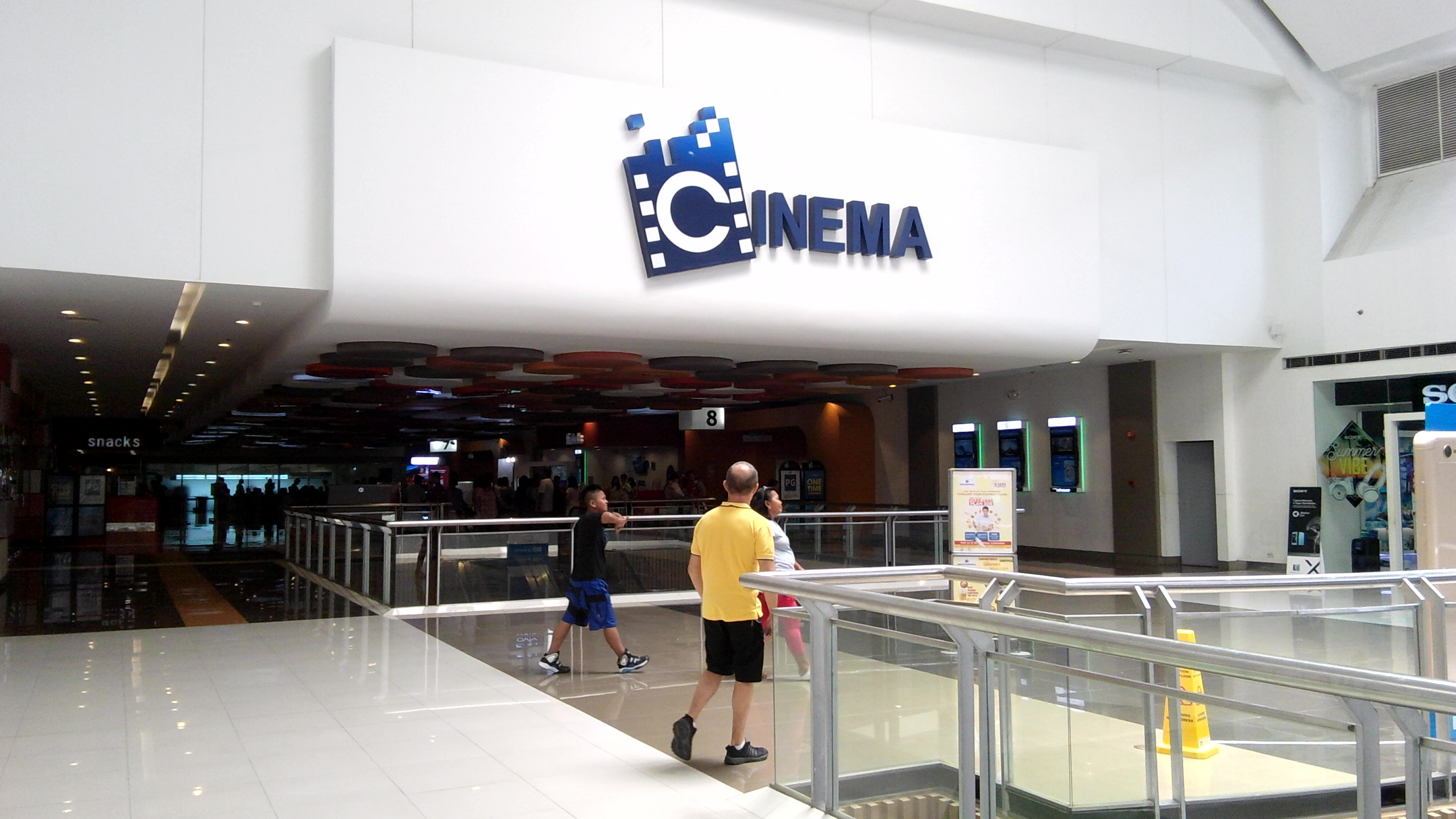
SM Cinema Southmall; old facade, West Wing

SM Cinema Southmall, which formally opened in late 1995, consists of eight cinemas with six regular cinemas (including Event Cinema) and two Director's Club Cinemas, it originally features 10 regular cinemas, the mall had an IMAX theater until 2025.

==== Director's Club Cinema ====
Two Director's Club Cinemas were opened on April 24, 2019, along with the premiere day of Avengers: Endgame, equipped with Dolby Atmos sound system and Christie CP2320-RGB pure laser cinema projector.

==== Redevelopment and renovation ====
Three cinemas in the West Wing (Cinemas 6 to 8) were closed on February 18, 2019, for renovation works, and re-opened on December 25 (Christmas Day), 2019, along with the celebration of the 2019 Metro Manila Film Festival (5 days after SM Mall of Asia opened their new cinemas on soft opening), with the new Cinemas 1 and 2 equipped with digital surround sound, premium seating and advanced laser projection, and a 45-seat Event Cinema (also the second Event Cinema branch after SM Mall of Asia that opened on December 12, 2018). The Cinemas 6 and 7, which were the old Cinemas 1 and 2 at the East Wing, remained open in temporary operations and were closed on February 27, 2020. The rest of the cinemas in the East Wing were permanently closed in February 2020 with the renovated cinemas opened in the West Wing on the same date. The former cinema wing is now occupied by SM Game Park at the former Cinema 4 and an Events Hall beside it.

=== Events Hall ===
The Events Hall is a 1,900 square meter multi-purpose function hall opened on October 11, 2023, at the former cinema area in the East Wing occupying the original Cinemas 1-3, featured with a basketball court that can accommodate up to 1,000 people for sporting events and 1,800 to 2,000 people for concert events.

== Former features ==
=== SM Storyland ===
The SM Storyland was an indoor theme park that opened in 1995 and is one of the mall's main attractions before the 2010 redevelopment. It features arcades, rides like roller coaster and bumper car.

The SM Storyland theme park was closed in May 2011 and was part of the renovation, however, some of its rides and attractions were moved at the SM By the Bay Amusement Park at the Mall of Asia Complex. Its space has been replaced with an outdoor parking.

=== SM Skating Rink ===
The SM Skating Rink was located at the second floor of the mall. The skating rink was permanently closed in 2022 and replaced with a space of the redeveloped food court.

=== IMAX ===
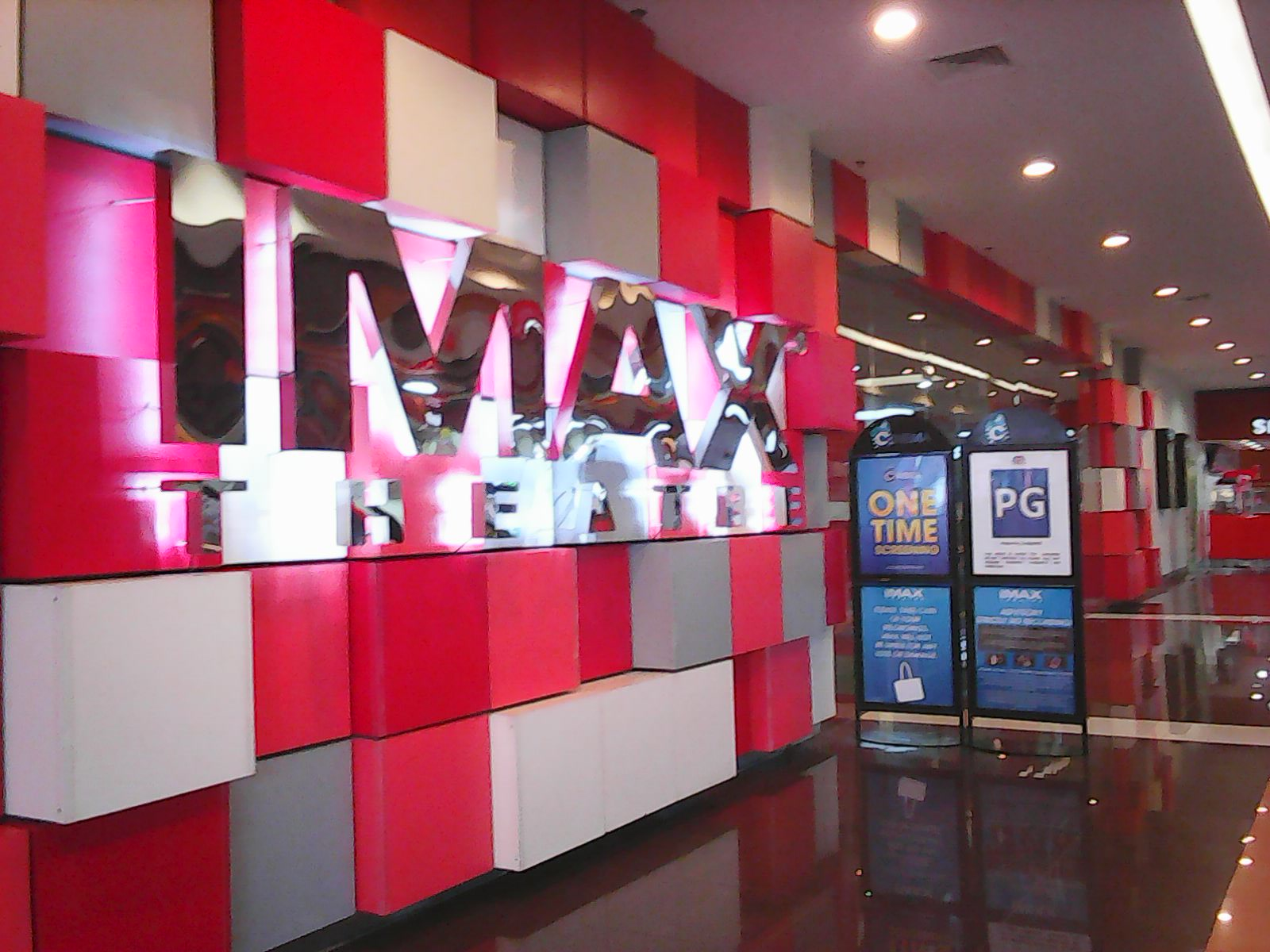
IMAX theater; old entrance

The IMAX theater opened on July 14, 2011, along with the release of Harry Potter and the Deathly Hallows – Part 2, it has a seating capacity of 440, and it is located at the West Wing of the mall. It is the fourth IMAX theater in the country after SM Mall of Asia, SM North EDSA, and SM City Cebu.

The IMAX discontinued operations on February 1, 2025, for unknown reasons most likely due to low sales compared to other IMAX locations in SM Mall of Asia and SM Aura which are best-selling IMAX locations as well as blockbuster movies and the focus of the upcoming IMAX location for South moviegoers in SM Nuvali in Santa Rosa, Laguna that is set to open on November 27, 2026, and its space is being occupied by the upcoming Fantasy World amusement park. The last showing of the film in this theater is the 10th anniversary re-release of Interstellar

== Mall complex developments ==
SM South Tower

=== South Residences at SM Southmall ===
The South Residences at SM Southmall is a condominium with four 15-storey towers. It is located at the south parking area near the entrance gate to Pilar Village.

=== SM South Tower ===
The SM South Tower was established last November 16, 2017. It is a two-tower, eight-storey BPO and carpark building, with parking on its four lower levels and offices above. with a total floor area of 55,092 m^{2} (593,010 sq ft). One of the main attractions in this building was the Bounce trampoline park, which was now closed due to the COVID-19 pandemic in the Philippines.

== Incidents ==
- August 2, 2004: Five security guards and bank escorts were wounded when 10 armed men fired shots at them before taking two bags of cash from Banco de Oro.
- April 11, 2012: A 55-year-old woman leapt to her death from the third floor at approximately 3:30 PM. Her son was questioned and added that his mother had been taking antidepressant drugs for an unspecified mental health condition.
- April 24, 2014: A 17-year-old male died after jumping from the third floor and landing on the lower ground level. According to the police, he was a resident of Metrocor Homes-B in Las Piñas. He was brought to a hospital where he was declared dead.
- August 5, 2017: A councilor from Pasay was hurt in a shooting incident at the mall's driveway near Door 4 (back entrance) at around 8:30 PM. Senior Superintendent Marion Balonglong, Las Piñas City Police chief, identified the injured local official as Borbie Rivera. He was declared dead on arrival at the Asian Hospital and Medical Center in Muntinlupa.

== Gallery ==
SM Southmall South Wing

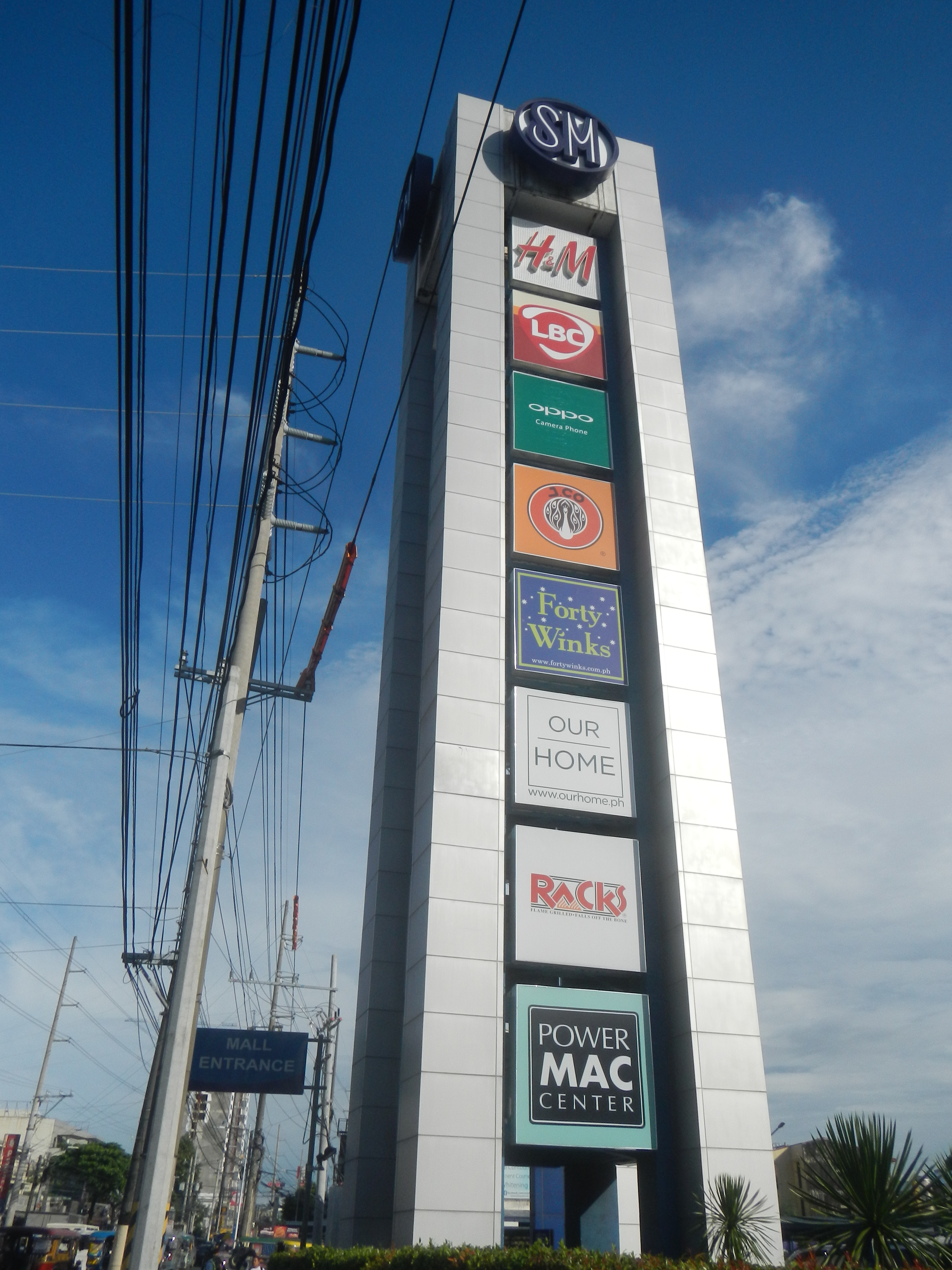
Obelisk

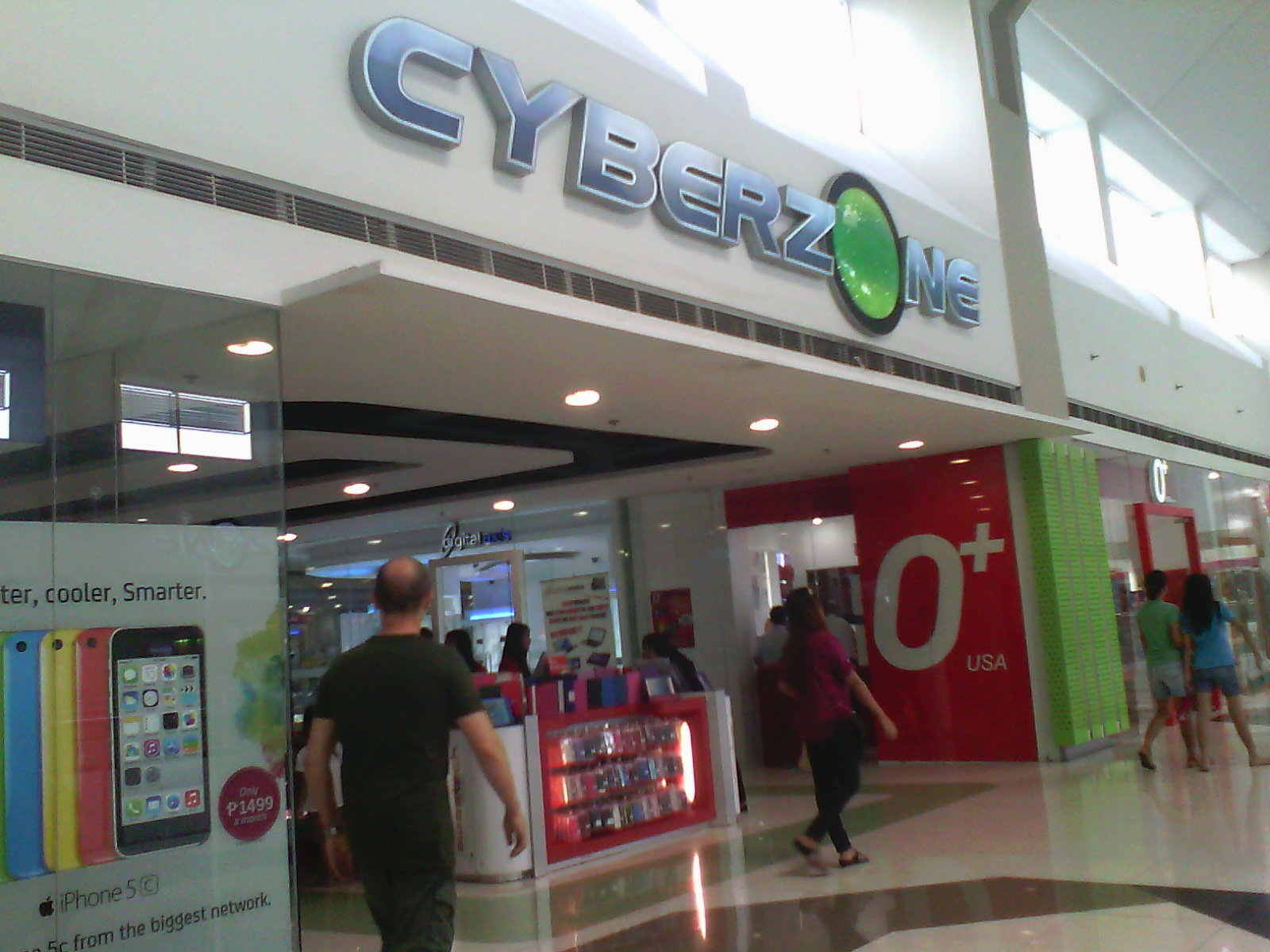
SM Cyberzone

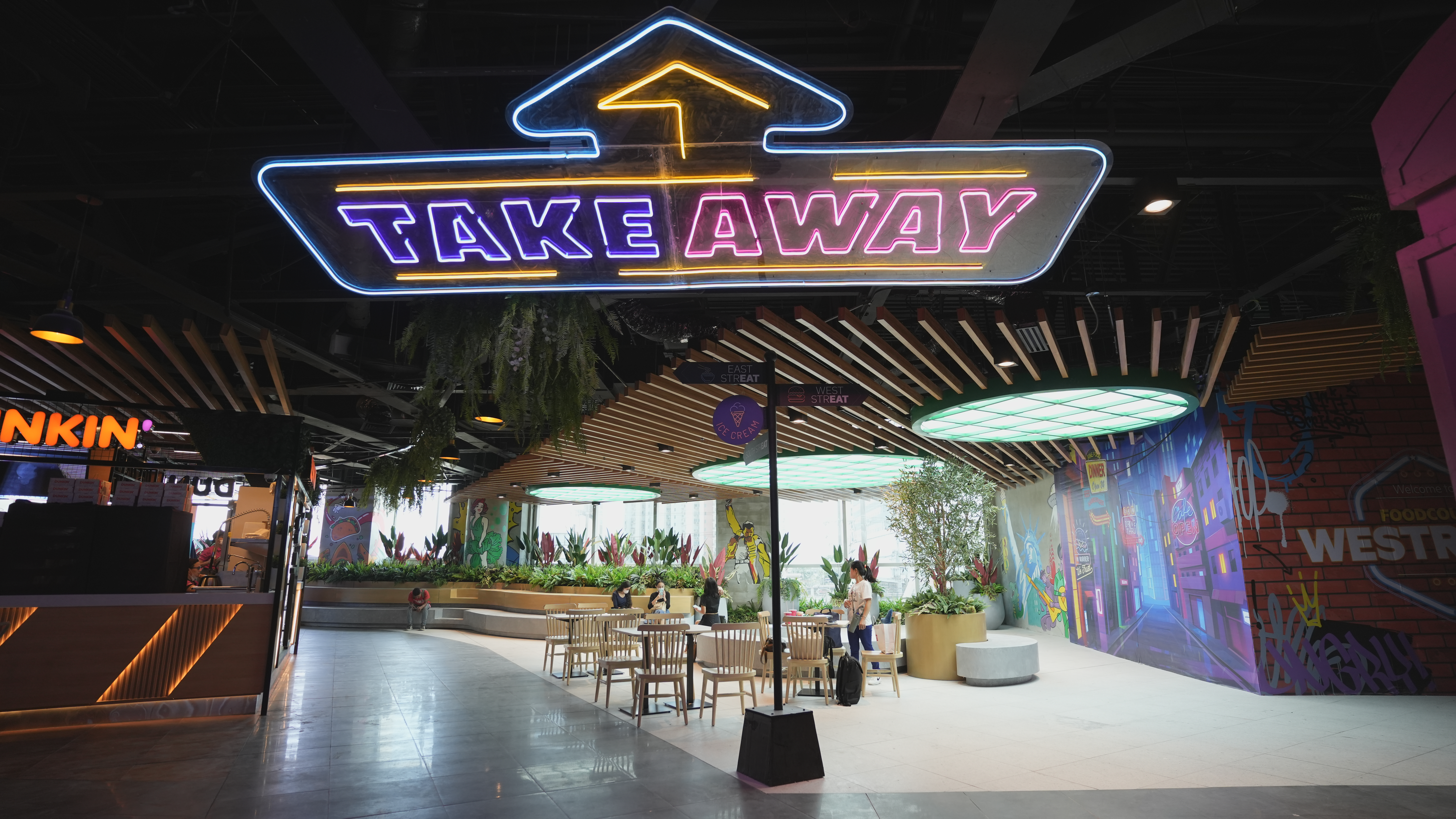
Newly renovated SM Foodcourt at SM Southmall last September 15, 2023

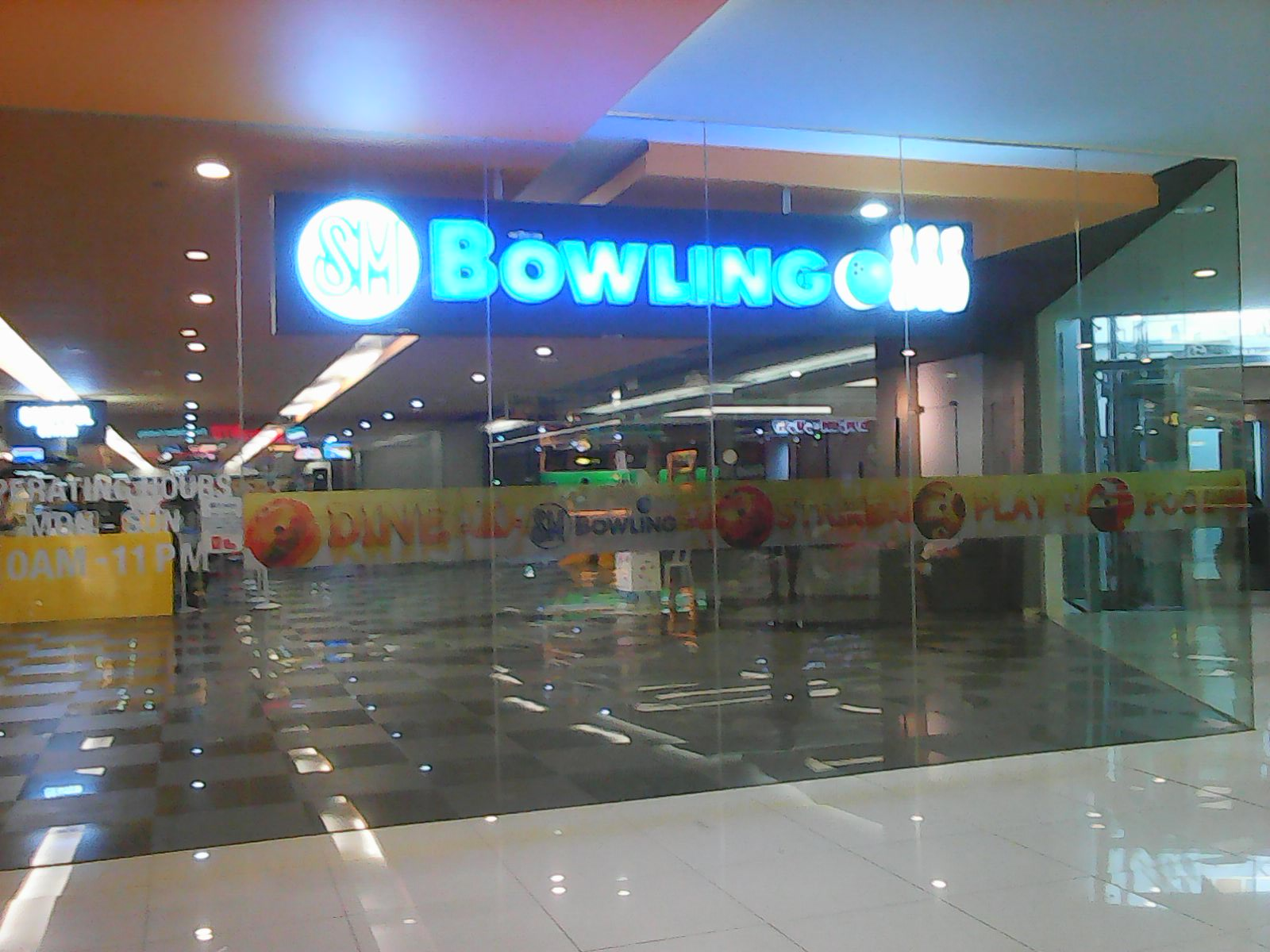
SM Bowling Center; old location, now relocated at third floor at SM Game Park at the occupied cinemas in the East Wing, old space is now a Driftito indoor go-kart attraction.

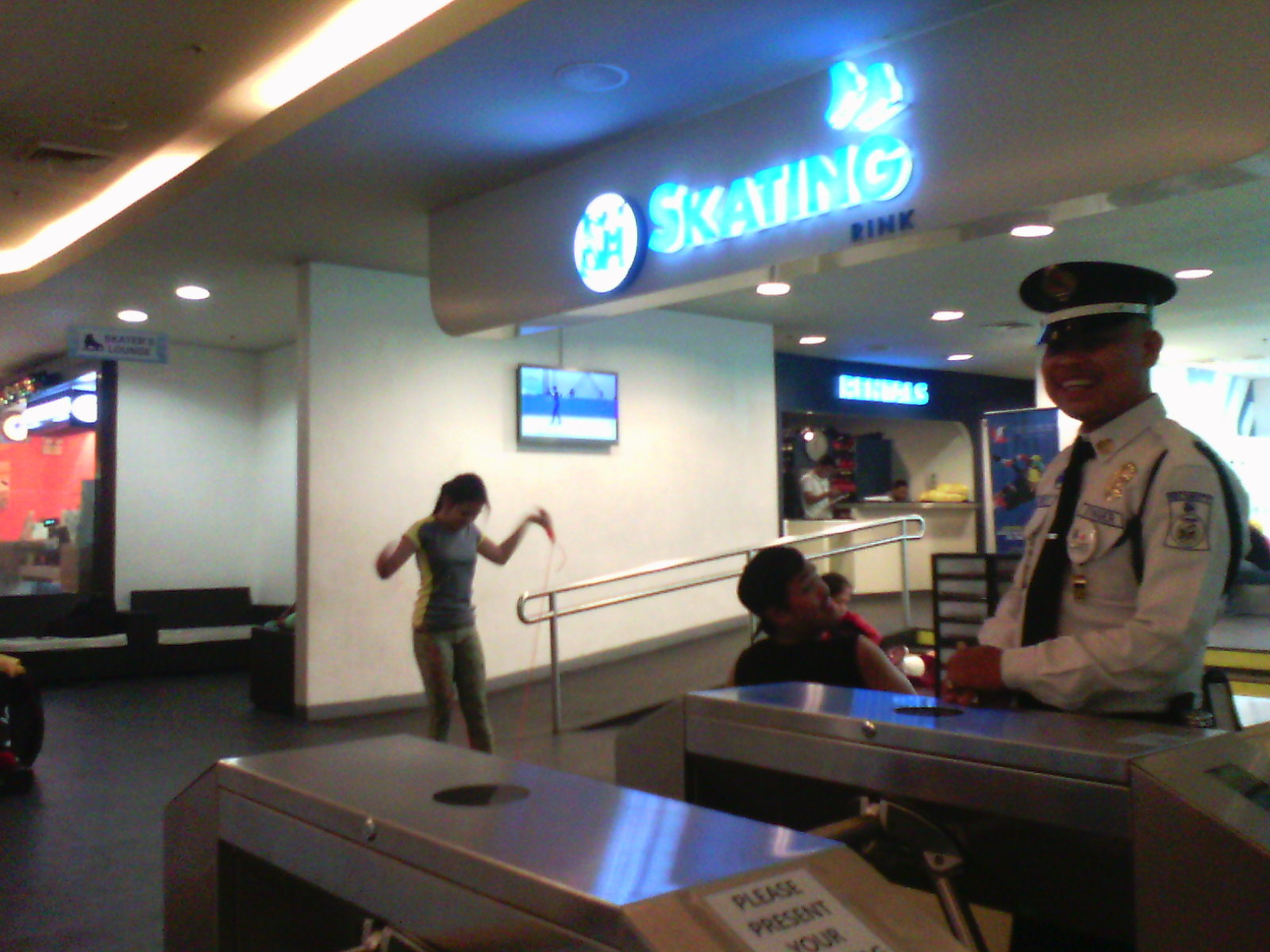
SM Skating Rink entrance

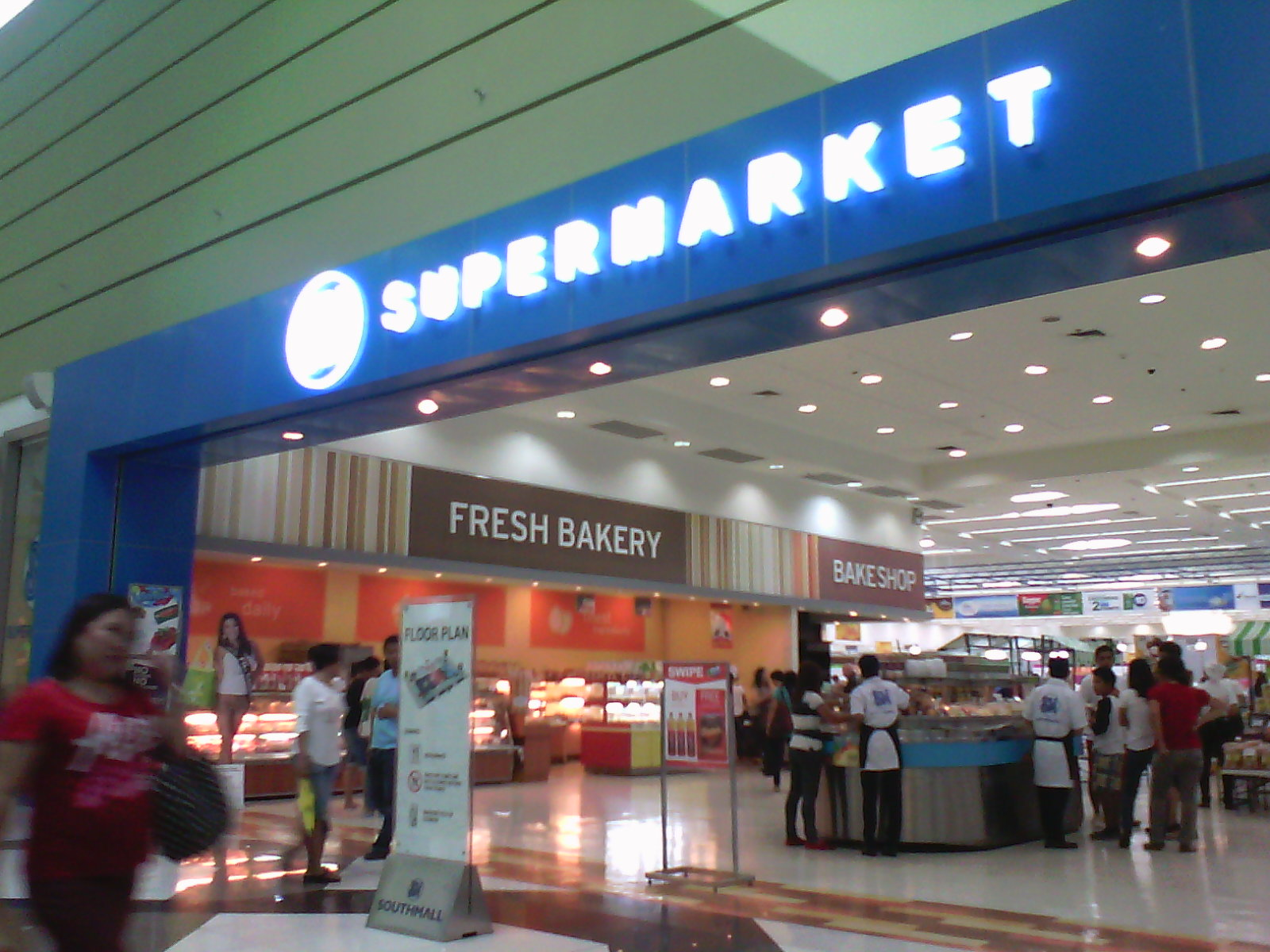
SM Supermarket

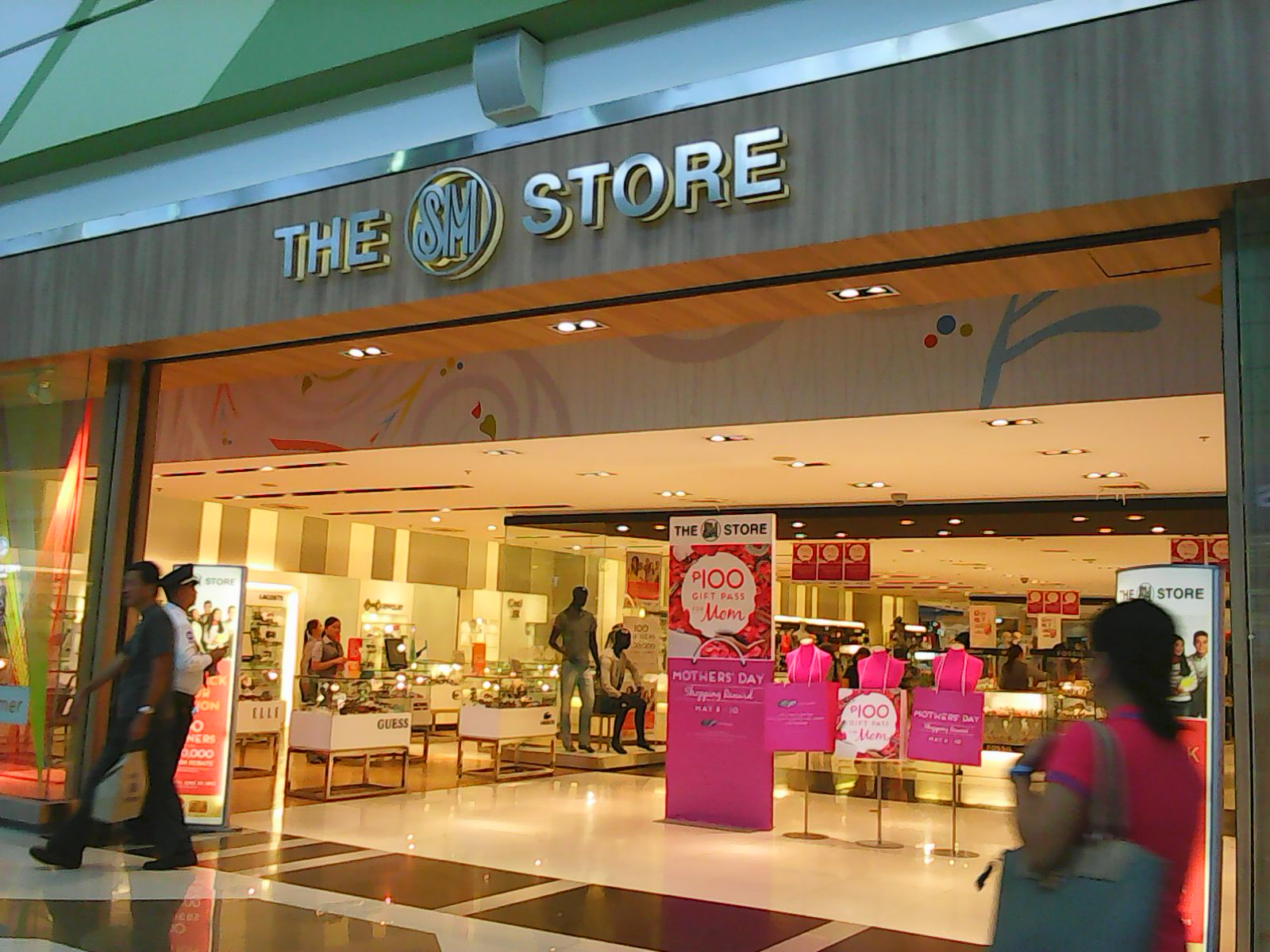
The SM Store

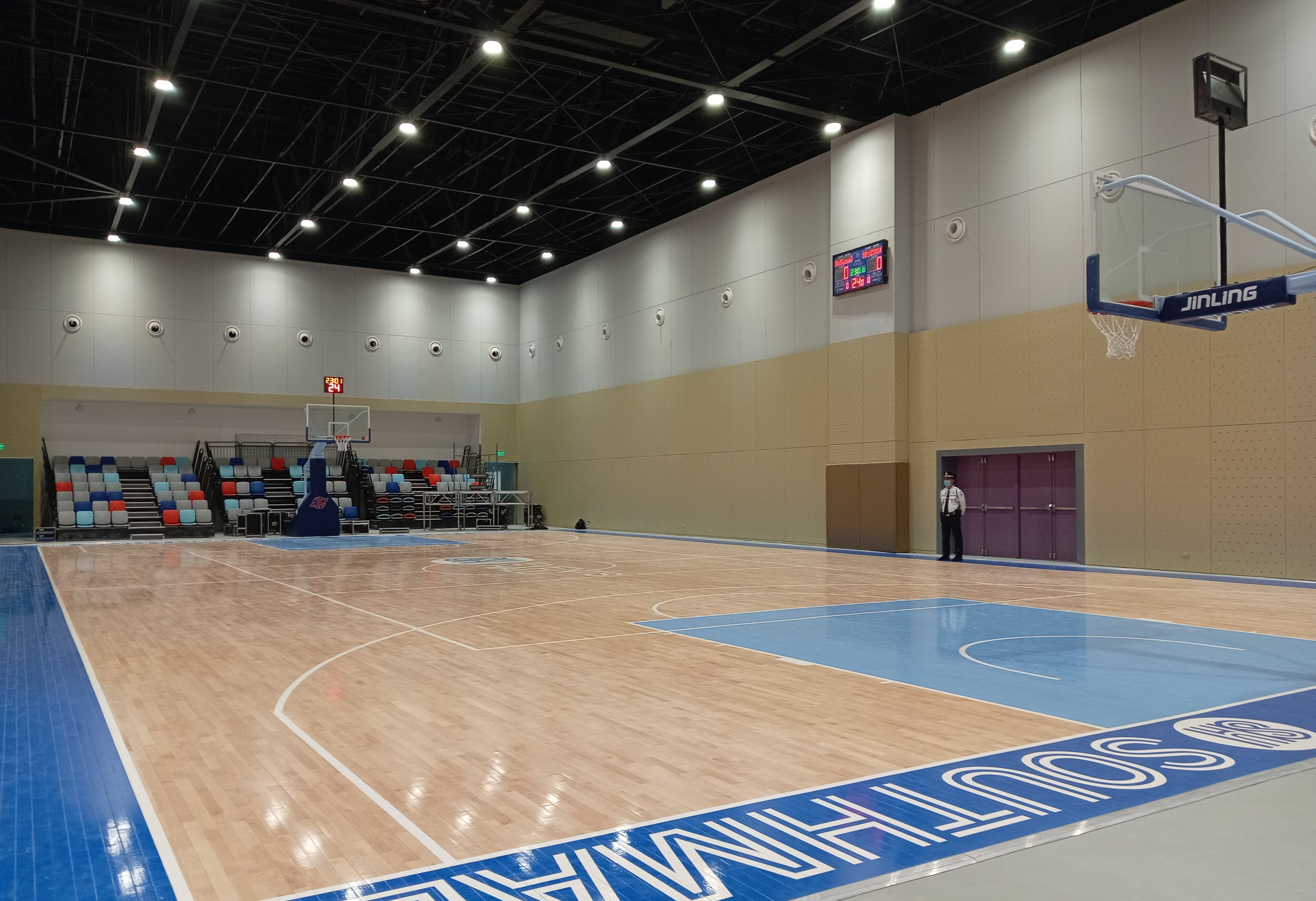
Events Hall was opened on October 11, 2023

Entry sign for SM Southmall

== See also ==
- SM Supermalls
- Alabang Town Center
- Festival Alabang
- List of shopping malls in Metro Manila

Preceded by SM City Cebu	5th SM Supermall; 1995	Succeeded by SM City Bacoor
