= Santa Rosa, Mapiri =

Santa Rosa (Mapiri)
- Town
- Nickname: फफं
- Location within Bolivia
- Coordinates: 15°19′S 68°20′W
- Country: Bolivia
- Department: La Paz Department
- Province: Larecaja Province
- Municipality: Mapiri Municipality

Population (2001)
  - Total: 1,433
- Time zone: UTC-4 (BOT)

Santa Rosa is a small town in Bolivia.
