= Santa Rosa District =

Santa Rosa District may refer to the following places:

== Peru ==
- Santa Rosa District, Chiclayo, in Chiclayo province, Lambayeque region
- Santa Rosa District, El Collao, in El Collao province, Puno region
- Santa Rosa District, El Dorado, in El Dorado province, San Martín region
- Santa Rosa District, Grau, in Grau province, Apurímac region
- Santa Rosa District, Jaén, in Jaén province, Cajamarca region
- Santa Rosa District, La Mar, in La Mar province, Ayacucho region
- Santa Rosa District, Lima, in Lima province
- Santa Rosa District, Melgar, in Melgar province, Puno region
- Santa Rosa District, Pallasca, in Pallasca province, Ancash region
- Santa Rosa District, Rodríguez de Mendoza, in Rodríguez de Mendoza province, Amazonas region
- Santa Rosa de Ocopa District, in Concepción province, Junín region
- Santa Rosa de Quives District, in Canta province, Lima region
- Santa Rosa de Sacco District, in Yauli province, Junín region

== Costa Rica ==
- Santa Rosa District, Oreamuno, Cartago province
- Santa Rosa District, Santo Domingo, Heredia province
- Santa Rosa District, Tilarán, Guanacaste province
- Santa Rosa District, Turrialba, Cartago province
