= Santa Rosa (Asunción) =

- Barrio
- Interactive map of Santa Rosa
- Country: Paraguay
- Autonomous Capital District: Gran Asunción
- City: Asunción

Area
  - Total: 0.43 km^{2} (0.17 sq mi)
- Elevation: 43 m (141 ft)

Population
  - Total: 1,950
  - Density: 4,500/km^{2} (12,000/sq mi)

Santa Rosa is a neighbourhood (barrio) of Asunción, Paraguay.
