= SS Santa Rosa =

SS Santa Rosa may refer to:

- SS Santa Rosa (1884), a screw steamer launched in 1884 and wrecked in 1911
- SS Santa Rosa (1916), was a passenger and cargo ocean liner built in 1916 and sunk in 1942
- SS Santa Rosa (1932), was a passenger and cargo ocean liner built in 1932 and scrapped in 1989
- SS Santa Rosa (1958) was a passenger and cargo ocean liner built in 1958 and scrapped in 2012.

== See also ==
- Ferryboat Santa Rosa
