= SM City Santa Rosa =

Shopping mall in Laguna, Philippines

- The facade of SM City Santa Rosa
- Location: Old National Highway, Brgy. Tagapo, Santa Rosa, Laguna
- Coordinates: 14°18′46″N 121°5′55″E
- Opened: Main Mall: February 17, 2006; 20 years ago Expansion Wing: June 24, 2022; 4 years ago
- Developer: SM Prime Holdings
- Manager: SM Prime Holdings
- Architect: Expansion Wing: ASYA Design
- Num. of stores: 350+
- Floor area: 137,463 m^{2} (1,479,640 sq ft)
- Floors: Mall: 2; The Core: 8
- Parking: 3,351
- Public transit: SRIT; Future: NSCR Santa Rosa
- Website: SM City Santa Rosa

SM City Santa Rosa is a shopping mall owned and operated by SM Prime Holdings. It is located along Old National Highway (Manila South Road), Barangay Tagapo, Santa Rosa, Laguna, Philippines. Opened in 2006, it is the first SM Supermall in the province of Laguna.

== Physical details ==
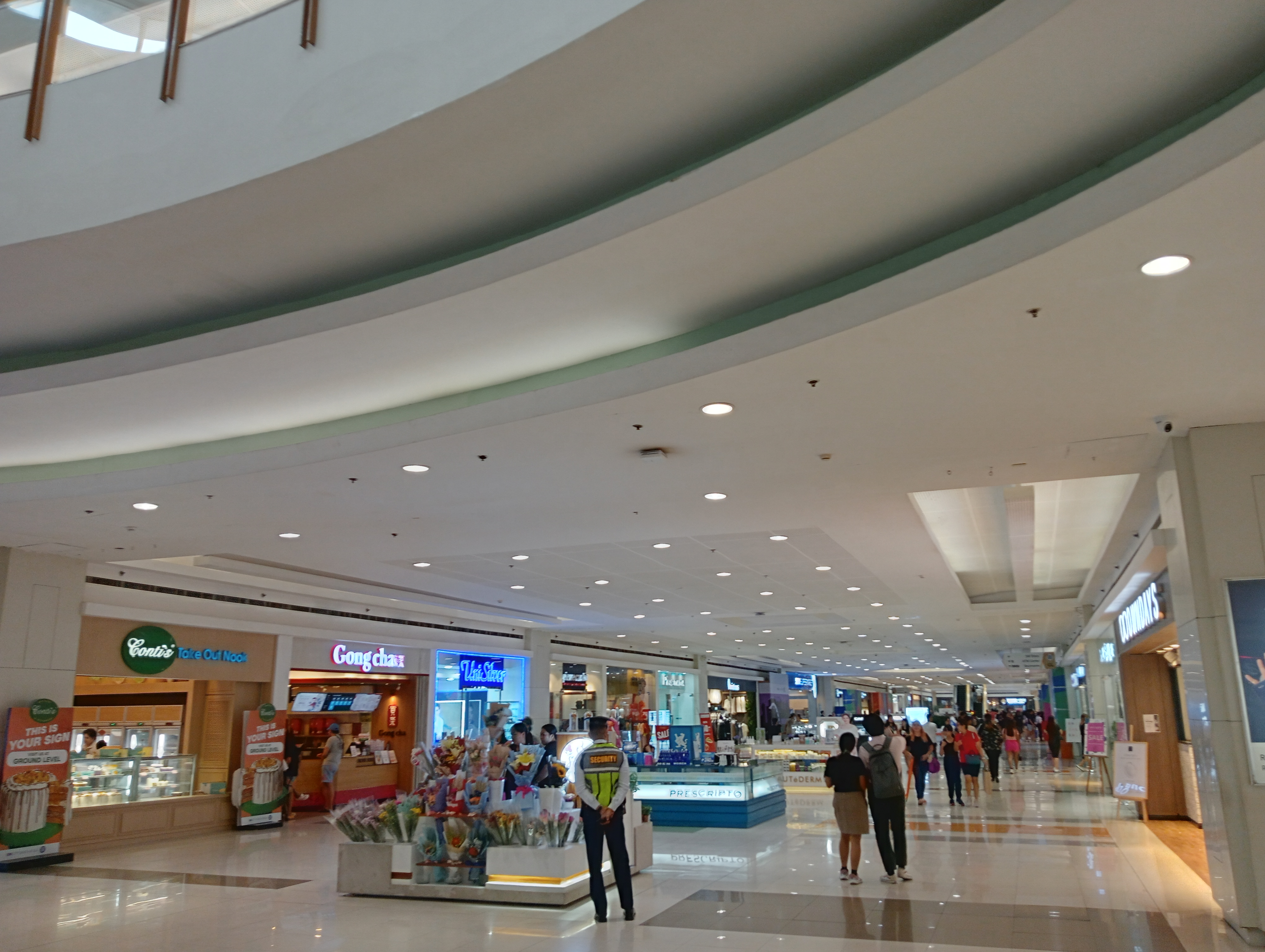
Interior of the main mall building

Opened on February 17, 2006, SM City Santa Rosa has a land area of 17 hectares (42 acres) and a total gross floor area of an estimated 170,000 square meters (1,800,000 sq ft). It is located at Manila South Road (Old National Highway or National Highway) corner Biñan–Santa Rosa Access Road in Barangay Tagapo, Santa Rosa, Laguna. It features more than 350 shops and various dining establishments. Anchors for SM City Santa Rosa are SM Supermarket, The SM Store, Ace Hardware, SM Appliance Center and a food court. The mall also includes retail anchors such as Uniqlo and Miniso, along with four digital cinemas on the second floor and a central garden known as The Rainforest.

The Cyberzone was opened in October 2012 at the former area of The Event Center.

=== Expansion Wing ===
Interior of the Expansion Wing

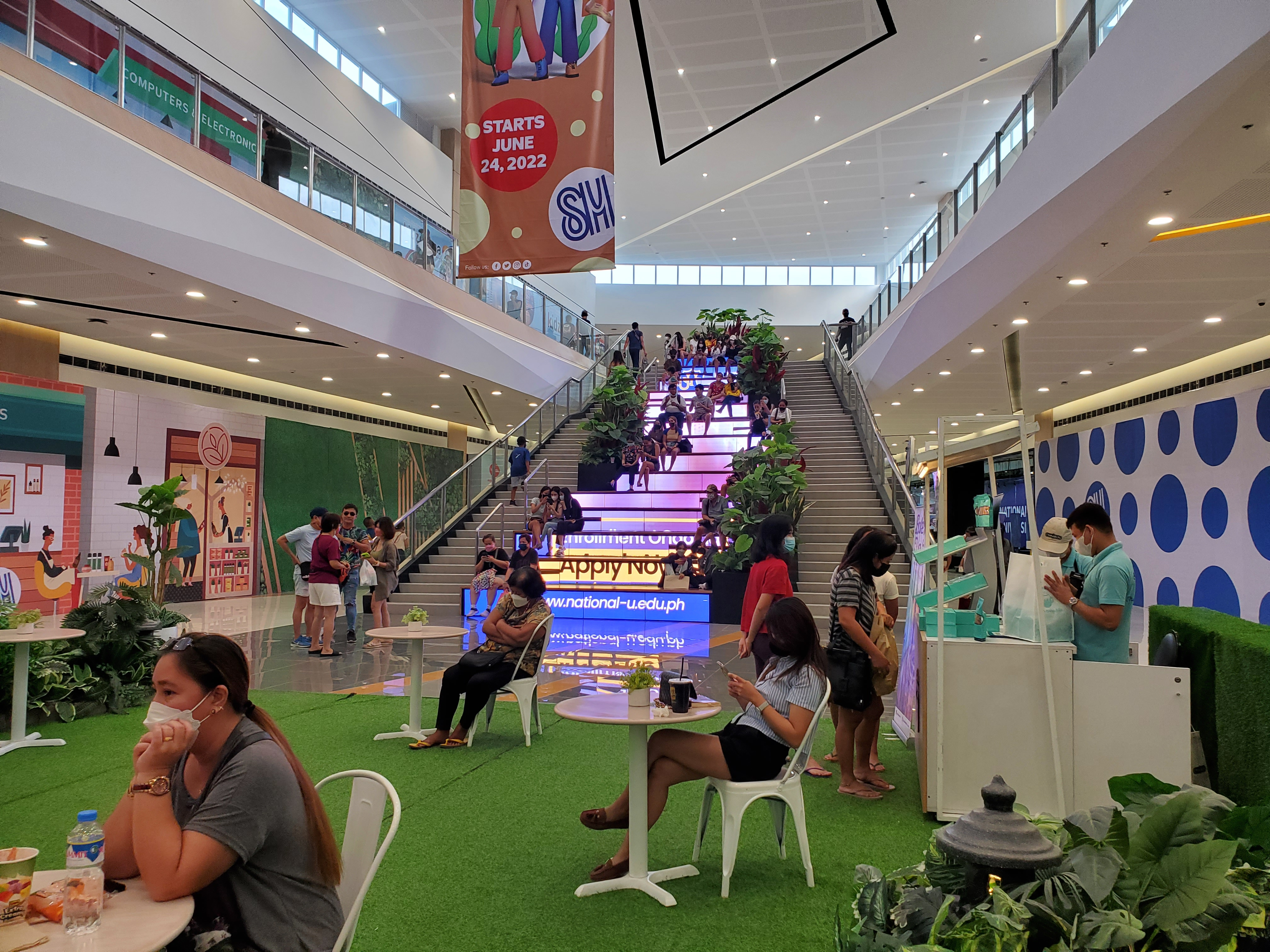
The LED staircase is the main feature of the Expansion Wing

SM City Santa Rosa's Expansion Wing is a 51,000 m^{2} (550,000 sq ft) expansion building that added up to the mall complex's area, totaling to 137,463 m^{2} (1,479,640 sq ft). It opened on June 24, 2022. Highlighted by a prominent LED staircase, it features an ice skating rink by SM Storyland and branches of H&M and Decathlon on the ground floor, along with an SM Game Park branch on the second floor.

Built atop the Expansion Wing is SM Supermalls' second-largest solar panel system, which previously held the title of the largest until it was surpassed by SM City Fairview in 2025. It comprises 5,772 panels at 3.088 MWp capacity and an annual solar energy production of up to 4.292 GWh, providing 15% of the mall's power.

== Mall complex developments ==
Currently undergoing expansion, the SM City Santa Rosa mall complex is one of integrated mixed-used developments known as SM Estates or SM Lifestyle Cities.

A 12,092-square-meter (130,160 sq ft) portion of the mall complex is the SM City Santa Rosa IT Center, which was designated as a special Information Technology Economic Zone under the Philippine Economic Zone Authority (PEZA) in June 2025. This portion includes The Core.

=== The Core ===
The Core is a three-tower BPO office building with a leasable area of at least 27,000 m^{2} (290,000 sq ft), of which majority is allotted solely to BPO companies. Each tower has four storeys. One tower is complete, while two other towers are under construction. It also contains a four-level parking space on its podium and is interconnected to the mall through a footbridge with the Expansion Wing.

iQor, a global managed services provider, celebrated the opening of its new center with a ribbon-cutting ceremony on April 27, 2018.

=== SMDC Park Residences ===
SM City Santa Rosa at night

The Park Residences at SM City Santa Rosa has a 14-tower, mid-rise residential condominium project with a total of 1,864 residential units and is located at the back of the mall. It also features an expansive central park that is inspired by New York City's Central Park.

=== Transportation ===
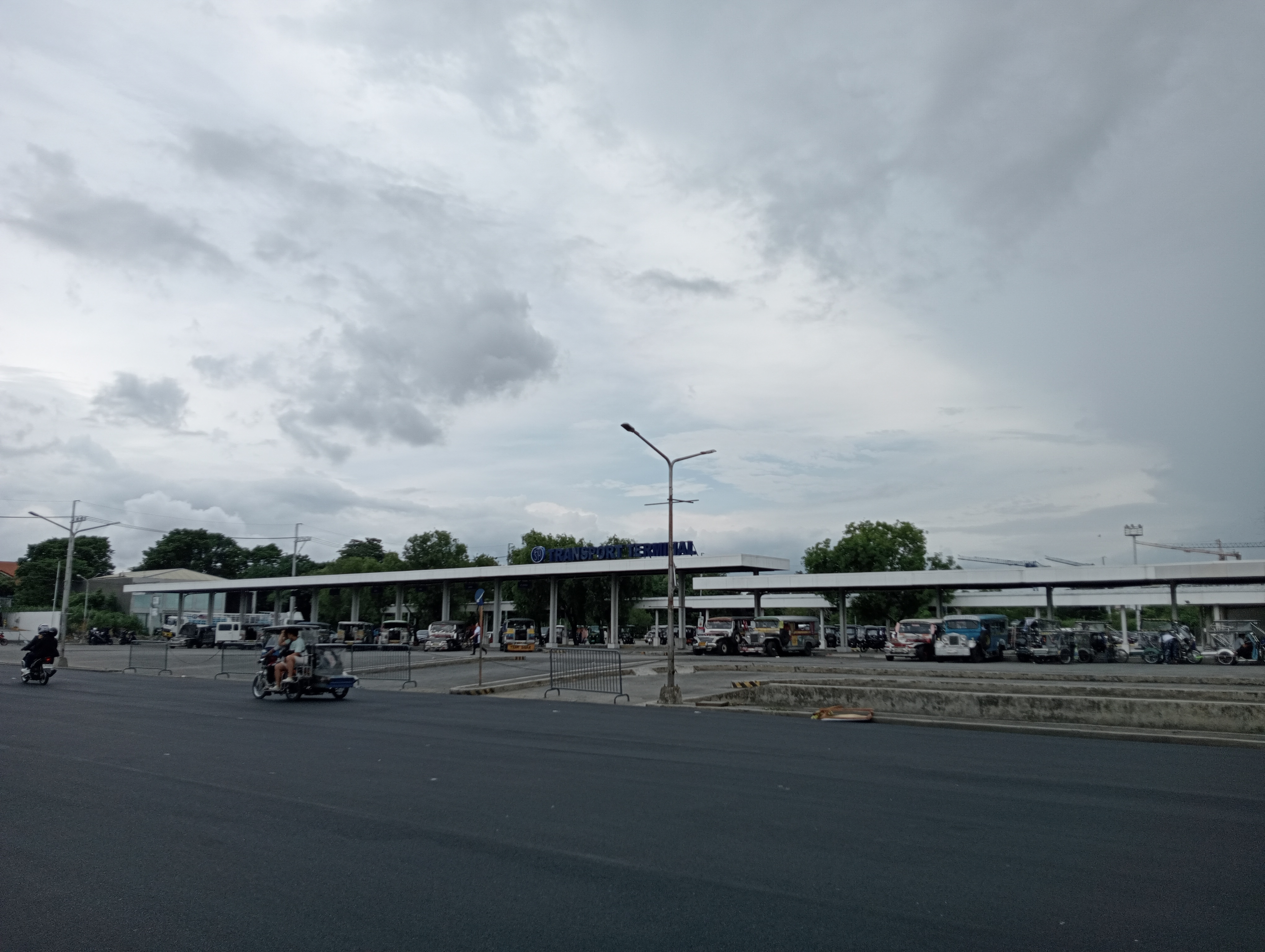
Transport terminal

The mall also features a Santa Rosa Integrated Terminal located at the former south parking area of the mall. It is the second of three planned provincial intermodal terminals for the south of Manila under a public-private partnership arrangement and opened on March 26, 2019.

Additionally, the mall is served by its transport terminal, which is also plied by tricycles. Jeepneys and mini-buses plying the Manila South Road route also stop in front of the mall.

The future Santa Rosa station of the North–South Commuter Railway will be located adjacent to the mall complex, just across the Manila South Road.

== Incidents ==
- February 3, 2015: A shootout occurred at one of the mall's entrances when a 16-year-old male suspect, carrying a bladed weapon, attempted to enter but was denied access. The suspect seized a handgun, fatally shooting a passing policeman before being shot dead by other policemen.
- March 5, 2023: About 20 mallgoers were injured when an upward escalator in the main mall malfunctioned and reversed around 5:00 p.m. PHT.
- August 3, 2023: Two subcontractor workers were found dead at the mall's septic tank on its driveway. According to a police investigation, the two may have suffocated while cleaning the septic tank.

== See also ==
- SM Supermalls
- SM Nuvali

| Preceded by SM City Molino | 23rd SM Supermall; 2006 | Succeeded by SM City Clark |
