= Santa Rosa, Mendoza =

Santa Rosa
- City
- Location of Santa Rosa in Argentina
- Coordinates: 33°15′S 68°9′W
- Country: Argentina
- Province: Mendoza
- Department: Santa Rosa

Population
  - Total: 15,818
- Time zone: UTC−3 (ART)
- CPA base: M5596
- Dialing code: +54 2623
- Climate: BWk

Santa Rosa is a city in the center-north of the province of Mendoza, Argentina, located on the northern shore of the Tunuyán River, by National Route 7, south-east from the provincial capital Mendoza. It has 15,818 inhabitants as per the 2001 census [INDEC], and is the head town of the Santa Rosa Department.
