= Santa Rosa, El Oro =

City in Ecuador

Santa Rosa
- City
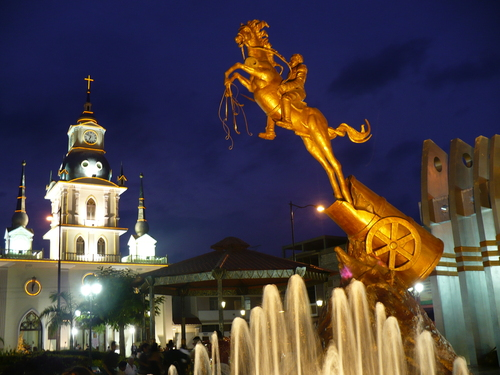
- Main square in Santa Rosa

- Flag
- Nicknames: La Benemérita (The Meritorious), Lídice de América (Lidice of America)
- Location within Ecuador
- Country: Ecuador
- Province: El Oro
- Canton: Santa Rosa

Government
  - Mayor: Larry Vite Cevallos

Area
  - City: 14.78 km^{2} (5.71 sq mi)
- Elevation: 10 m (33 ft)

Population (2022 census)
  - City: 56,842
  - Density: 3,846/km^{2} (9,961/sq mi)
- Demonym(s): Santarroseño, -a
- Time zone: UTC-5 (ECT)
- Website: http://www.santarosa.gob.ec/

Santa Rosa is a city in Ecuador located in the Santa Rosa Canton of El Oro Province. It is located in the south of the coastal region of Ecuador, in an extensive plain, on the right bank of the Santa Rosa River.

== Transport ==
Santa Rosa counts with the Santa Rosa International Airport, formerly known as the South Ecuador International Airport (Spanish: Aeropuerto Regional del Sur Ecuatoriano). Planning for the airport began in 2002.

== Festivities ==
The festivities in Santa Rosa are celebrated every year in August and last ten days. Events take place in front of the main Catholic Church where tourists can witness fireworks, folk music, typical dances, and local traditional games.

== Schools ==
High Schools Colegio National Tecnico Jambeli, Colegio Zoila Ugarte de Landivar, Colegio Wenceslay Oyague.

Middle schools and Elementaries Herminia Grunauer, Santa Teresita, Sucre, Alcidez Pesantes, Wenceslao.

== See also ==
- Santa Rosa (Spanish Wikipedia)
