= Santa Rosa, Valle Viejo =

Coordinates: 28°27′S 65°43′W

Santa Rosa (Valle Viejo)
- Municipality
- Interactive map of Santa Rosa (Valle Viejo)
- Country: Argentina
- Province: Catamarca Province
- Department: Greater San Fernando del Valle de Catamarca
- Time zone: UTC−3 (ART)

Santa Rosa (Valle Viejo) is a municipality in Catamarca Province in northwestern Argentina. It is located within the Greater San Fernando del Valle de Catamarca area.
