= SM City Clark =

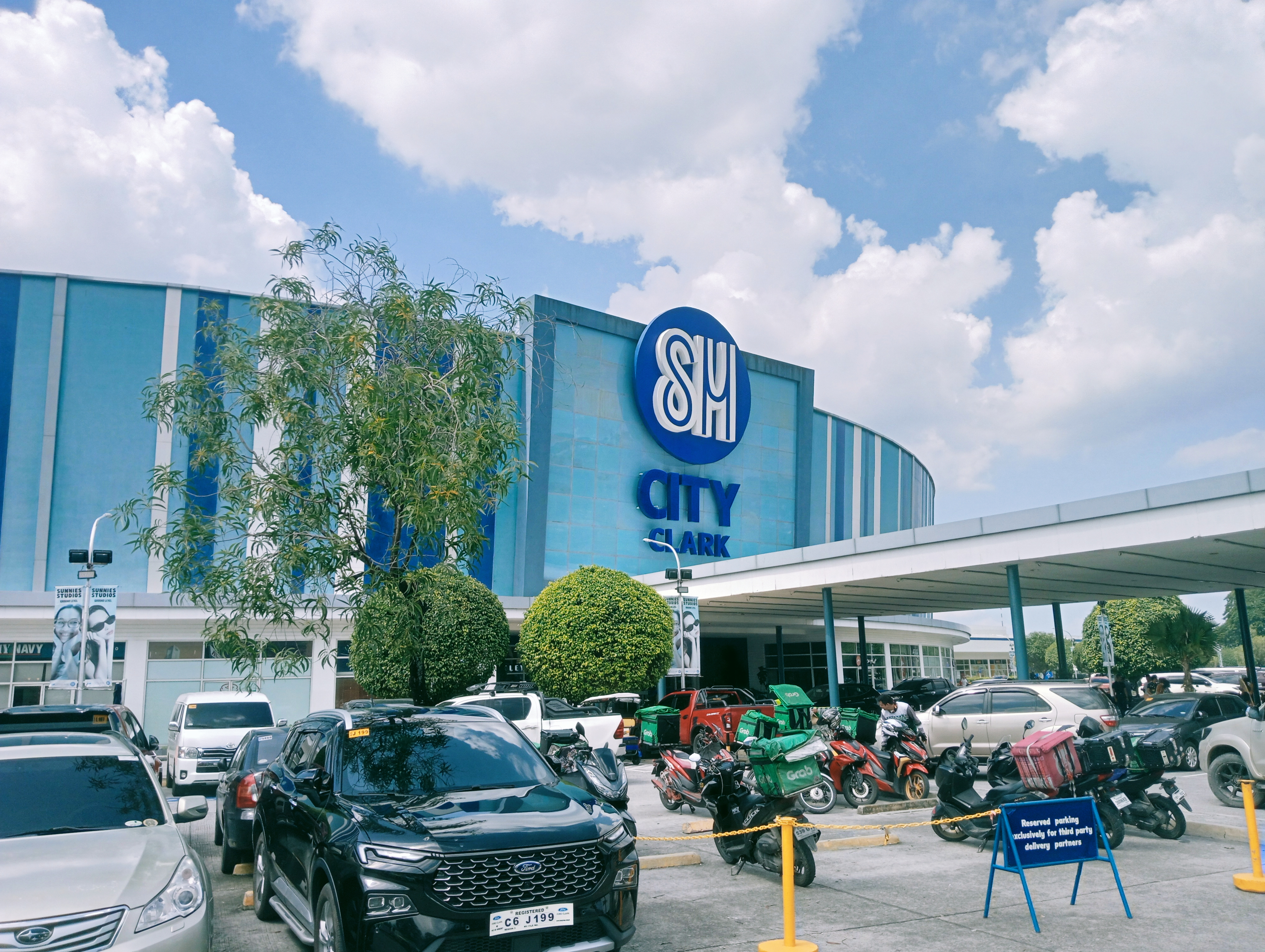
- The facade of SM City Clark in August 2024
- Location: Angeles City, Philippines
- Coordinates: 15°10′06″N 120°34′49″E
- Address: Manuel A. Roxas Highway, Barangay Malabanias, Clark Special Economic Zone
- Opened: May 12, 2006; 20 years ago
- Developer: SM Prime Holdings
- Manager: SM Prime Holdings
- Floor area: 154,000 m^{2} (1,660,000 sq ft)
- Floors: 2 (mall proper)
- Public transit: TriNoma Quezon City NAIA Pasay City West Aeropark Check Point Holy Check Point Balibago Dau
- Website: www.smsupermalls.com

SM City Clark is a shopping mall owned and operated by SM Prime in Angeles City, Pampanga, Philippines. This mall has a total gross floor area of 154,000 m^{2} (1,660,000 sq ft). It is located along M.A. Roxas Highway within the Clark Special Economic Zone adjacent to the Clark Freeport Zone.

== History ==
=== Development ===
The Clark Development Corporation (CDC) allowed Premier Central Inc. (PCI) to build and operate a shopping mall under SM Prime within the Clark area on August 7, 2003. In 2002, president Henry Sy Jr. made an ocular visit to select the location of the mall.

The mall project was met with opposition from a group of locators in the Clark Freeport Zone (CFZ) who are worried that the opening of the mall would drive them bankrupt. The CDC assured that the future shopping mall would not benefit from special tax privileges given to businesses within the CFZ. The main gate of the CFZ was moved inward to place the mall outside the zone.

=== Opening ===
SM City Clark in 2009.

The two-storey mall eventually opened as SM City Clark on May 12, 2006. SM Clark started with 101,000 square meters (1,090,000 sq ft). The mall proper is located at the Clark Special Economic Zone within the boundaries of Angeles City but outside the CFZ. The mall pays taxes to Angeles City. SM City Clark is the 24th mall overall for SM Prime, and the second mall in Pampanga after SM City Pampanga.

=== Operation and expansion ===
Since then mall compound has been expanded. In 2013, SM Group and Carlson Rezidor signed a deal which leads to the development of a Park Inn by Radisson within the mall complex. The hotel opened on December 10, 2015. A office complex for information technology and business process outsourcing has begun to be developed with six buildings built by 2016. SM Prime was subleased additional 10 hectares (25 acres) of land under the Clark Global City.

A branch of the SMX Convention Center broke ground in late 2018. The convention center opened on May 23, 2022.

By June 2022, the shopping mall has added 53,000 square meters (570,000 sq ft) complex. National University Clark opened its campus within the complex in August 2023.

== Mall proper ==
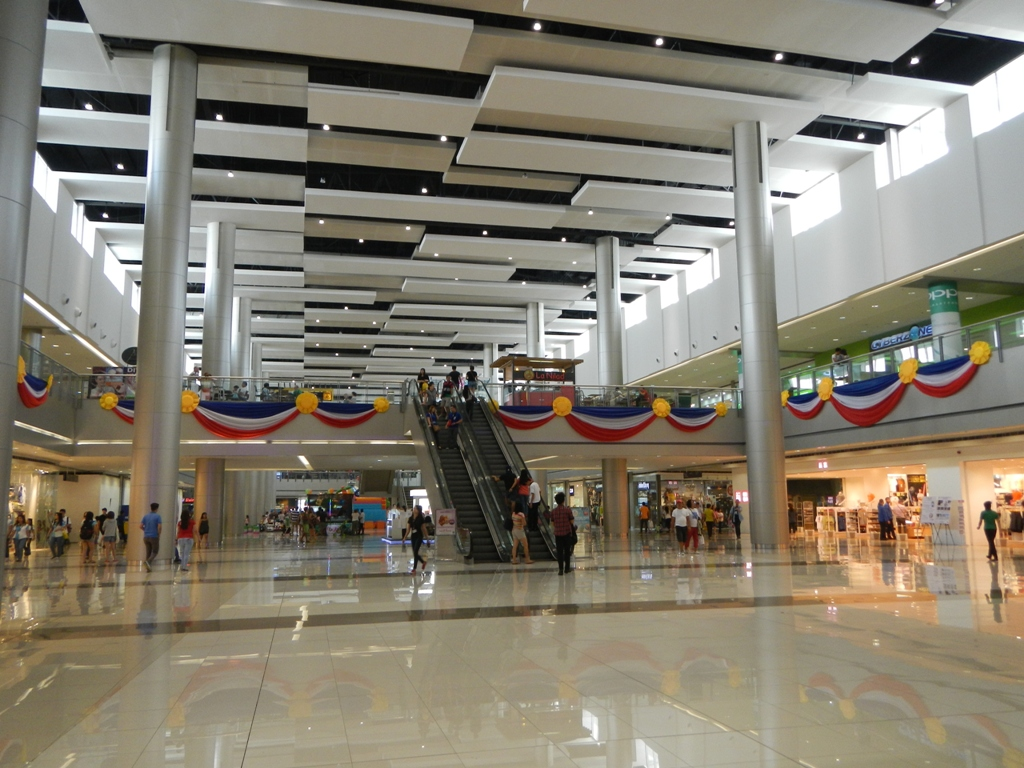
Mall interior in 2015.

The building proper of the SM City Clark has two-storeys with its main structure being circular in shape in different shades of blue. It was designed by Jose Siao Ling and Associates with the architect of record being D.A. Abcede and Associates. It has a department store, a supermarket, and a foodcourt. It also have cinemas including an IMAX theater. The mall also hosts a check-in facility for travelers of the Clark International Airport since March 2025.

== SM City Clark Complex ==
=== Clark Tech Hub ===
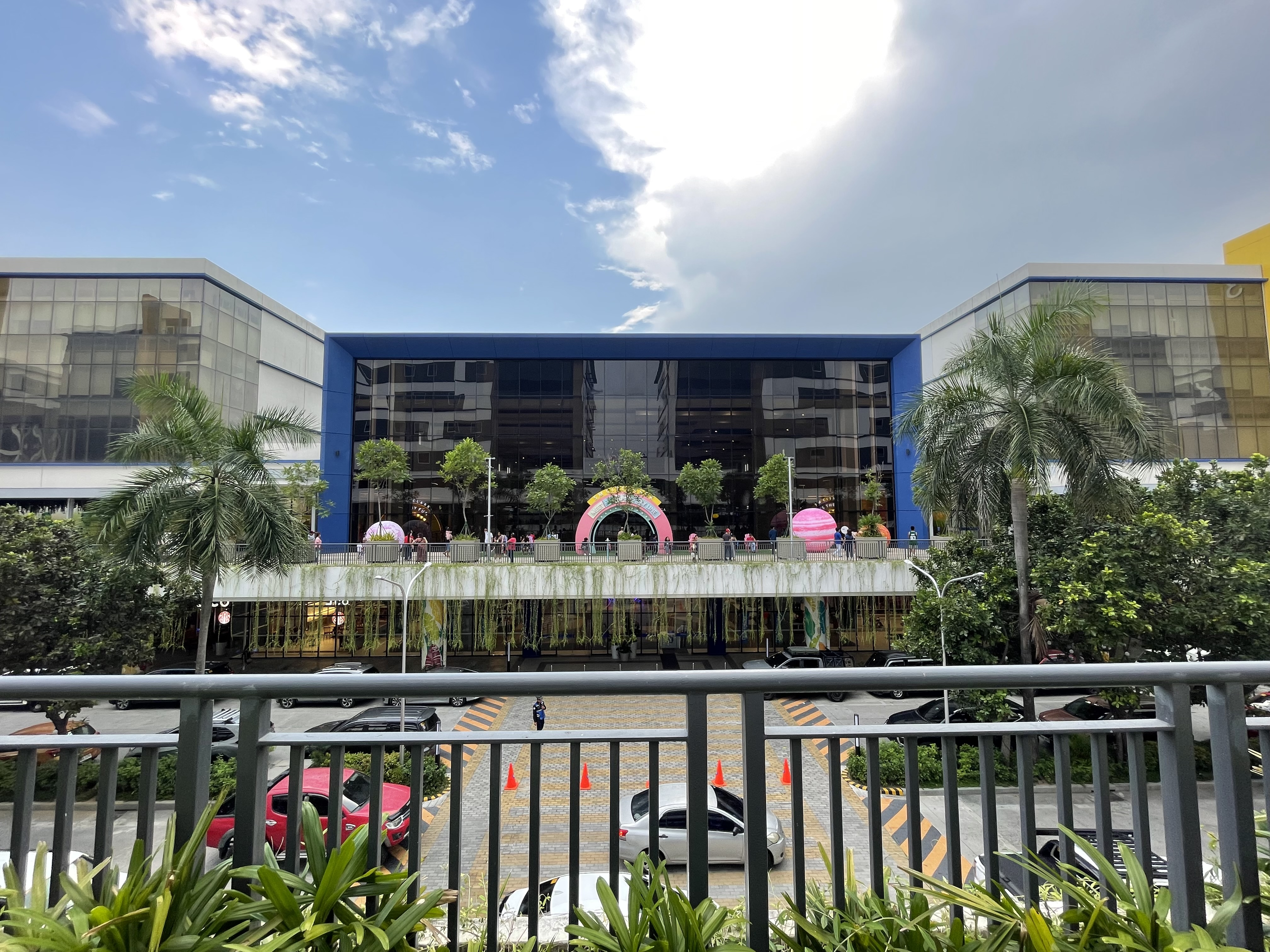
The Meeting Place between two buildings of the Clark Tech Hub.

The SM City Clark complex hosts ten office building towers which hosts firms engaged in business process outsourcing. The office complex is called the Clark Tech Hub and has ten buildings as of 2026.

Clark Tech Hub No. 8 also hosts the Clark campus of the National University (NU) which opened in August 2023. It is the 10th campus of NU. The SM Group owns a majority ownership of NU.

=== Park Inn by Radisson Clark ===
The Park Inn by Radisson Clark is a 254-room hotel within the SM City Clark complex. The north wing opened first in December 2015 and has 154-room. The hotel expanded with the opening of the 100-room south wing in 2021.

=== SMX Convention Center ===
The SMX Convention Center Clark is a convention center within the SM City Clark complex. It has a gross floor area of 4,000 square meters (43,000 sq ft). It has three halls with a total floor area of 1,466 m^{2} (15,780 sq ft), three function rooms which can accommodate 450 to 1,000 people, and 14 meeting rooms which can be modified to accommodate up to 700 people.

=== Skyline ===
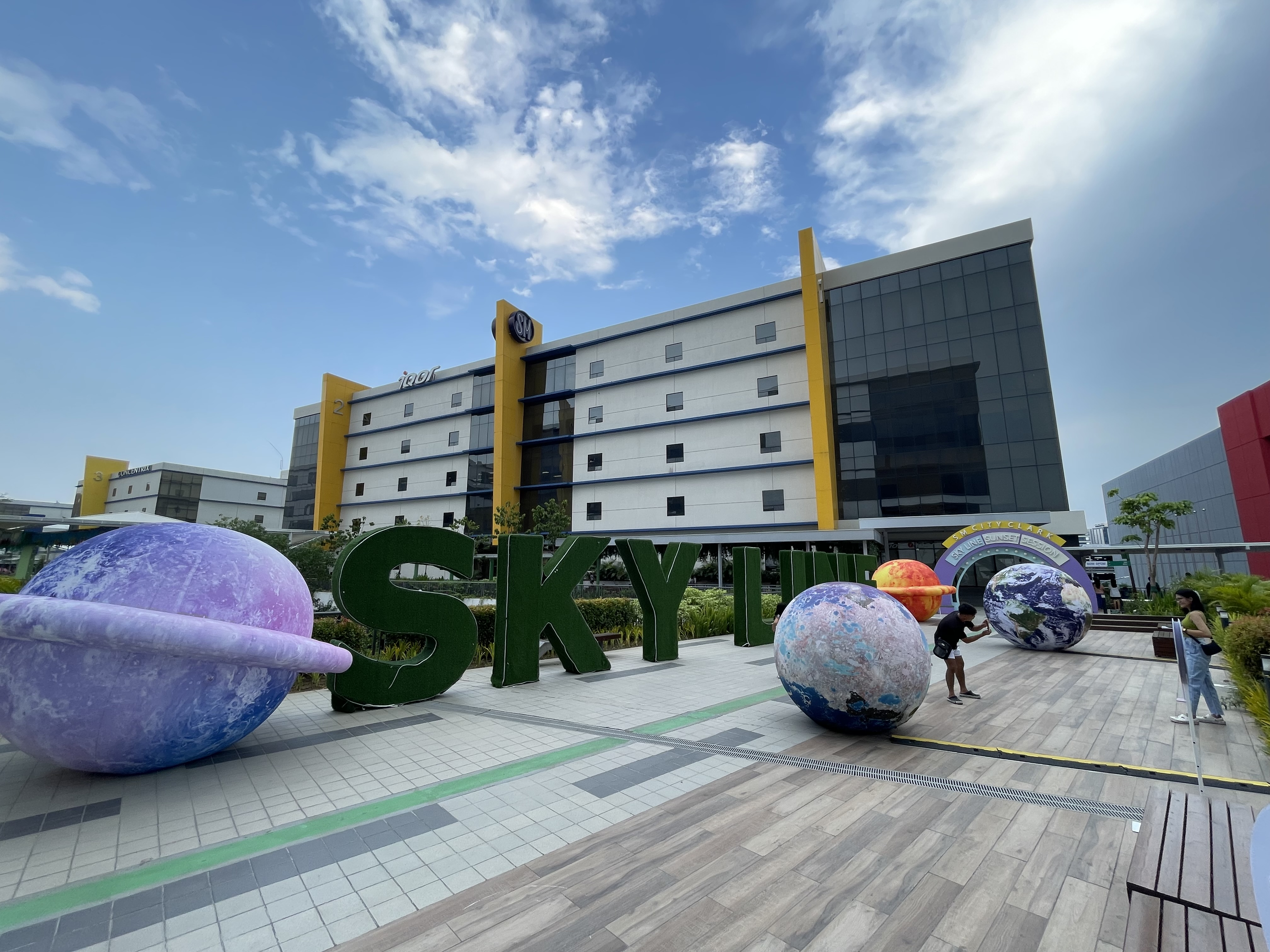
Skyline at the SM City Clark

The Skyline is a network of bridgeway and elevated park connecting the buildings of the SM City Clark complex. Situated on the northern edge of the mall proper, Skyline is 4 meters (13 ft) above-ground and covers an area of 9,018 m^{2} (97,070 sq ft).

=== SM Grand Terminal Clark ===
The mall complex will host the SM Grand Terminal Clark, an multimodal transport terminal. The groundbreaking for the facility took place in late 2021.

== Events ==
- The mall held the PyroFest, the biggest fireworks festival every year of November at 'The Meeting Place'.
- The mall held the 10th Philippine International Pyromusical Competition on February to March 2019. This was supposed to be at the SM Mall of Asia bayside area, but was postponed in support for the Manila Bay Rehabilitation Program by the Department of Environment and Natural Resources or DENR.
- On December 28, 2024, the mall held a fireworks display at Skyline, the Skyline Fireworks Festival.

Preceded by SM City Santa Rosa	24th SM Supermall; 2006	Succeeded by SM Mall of Asia
