= St. Rose Cathedral, Santa Rosa de Copán =

Coordinates: 14.7674°N 88.7776°W

St. Rose Cathedral
- Catedral de Santa Rosa
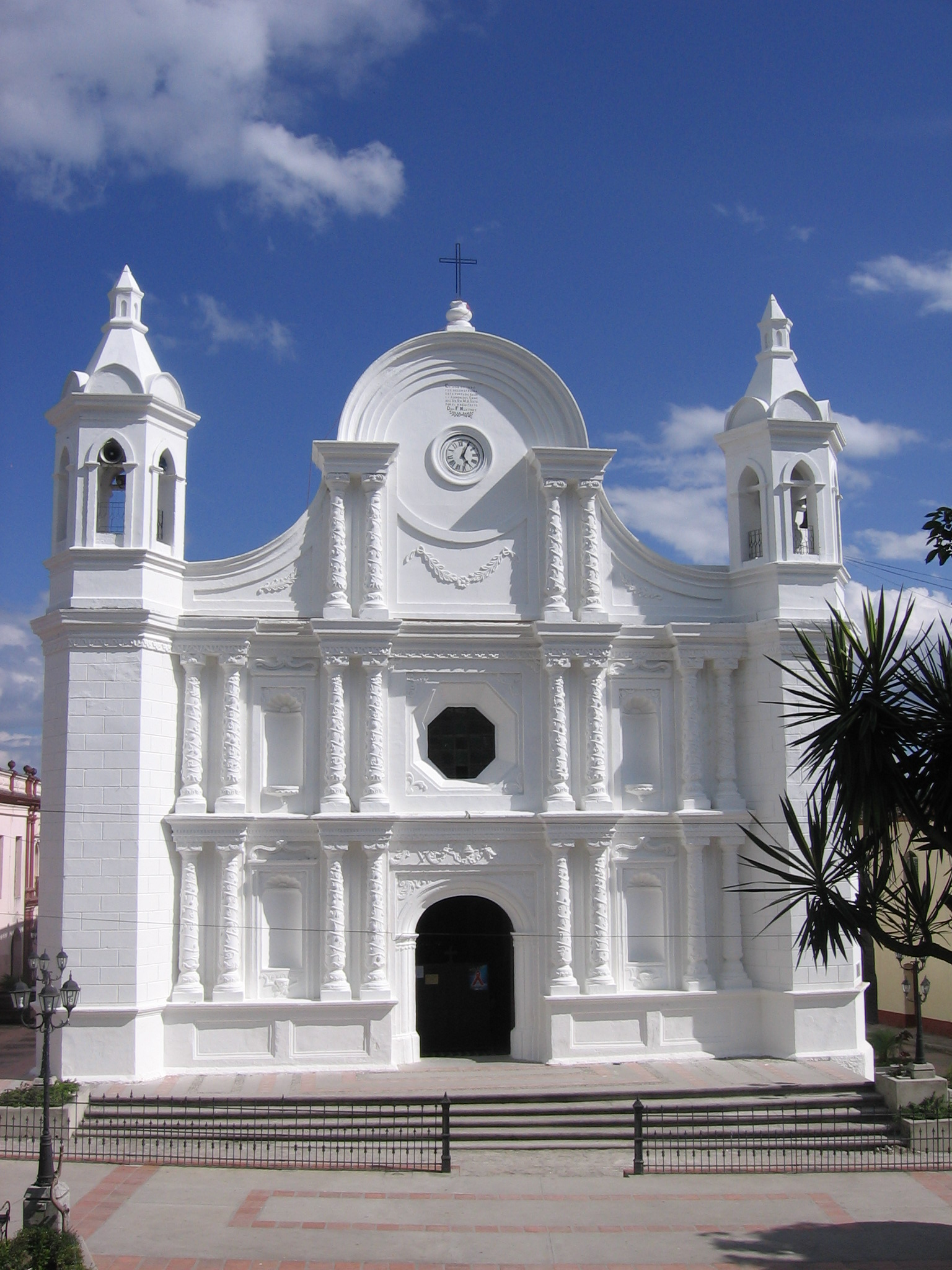
- St. Rose Cathedral
- Location: Santa Rosa de Copán
- Country: Honduras
- Denomination: Roman Catholic Church

Architecture
- Architect: church

St. Rose Cathedral (Spanish: Catedral de Santa Rosa), also called Santa Rosa de Copán Cathedral, is the main church of the Roman Catholic Diocese of Santa Rosa de Copán in the city of Santa Rosa de Copán in the Central American country of Honduras. The church is dedicated to St. Rose of Lima.

The first church was built between 1798 and 1803. The building suffered some serious damage as a result of a strong earthquake on 21 November 1877. In 1880 the architect Francisco Martínez was employed to repair the cathedral, partially reconstructing it while maintaining the baroque style. On 26 December 1915 another strong earthquake caused damage to the cathedral, the repairing of which in 1916 coincided with the founding of the Diocese of Santa Rosa d Copán.

== See also ==
- List of cathedrals in Honduras
- Roman Catholicism in Honduras
- St. Rose's Church (disambiguation)
