= Santa Rosa, Tinogasta =

Coordinates: 28°02′S 67°37′W

Santa Rosa (Tinogasta)
- Municipality and town
- Interactive map of Santa Rosa (Tinogasta)
- Country: Argentina
- Province: Catamarca Province
- Time zone: UTC−3 (ART)

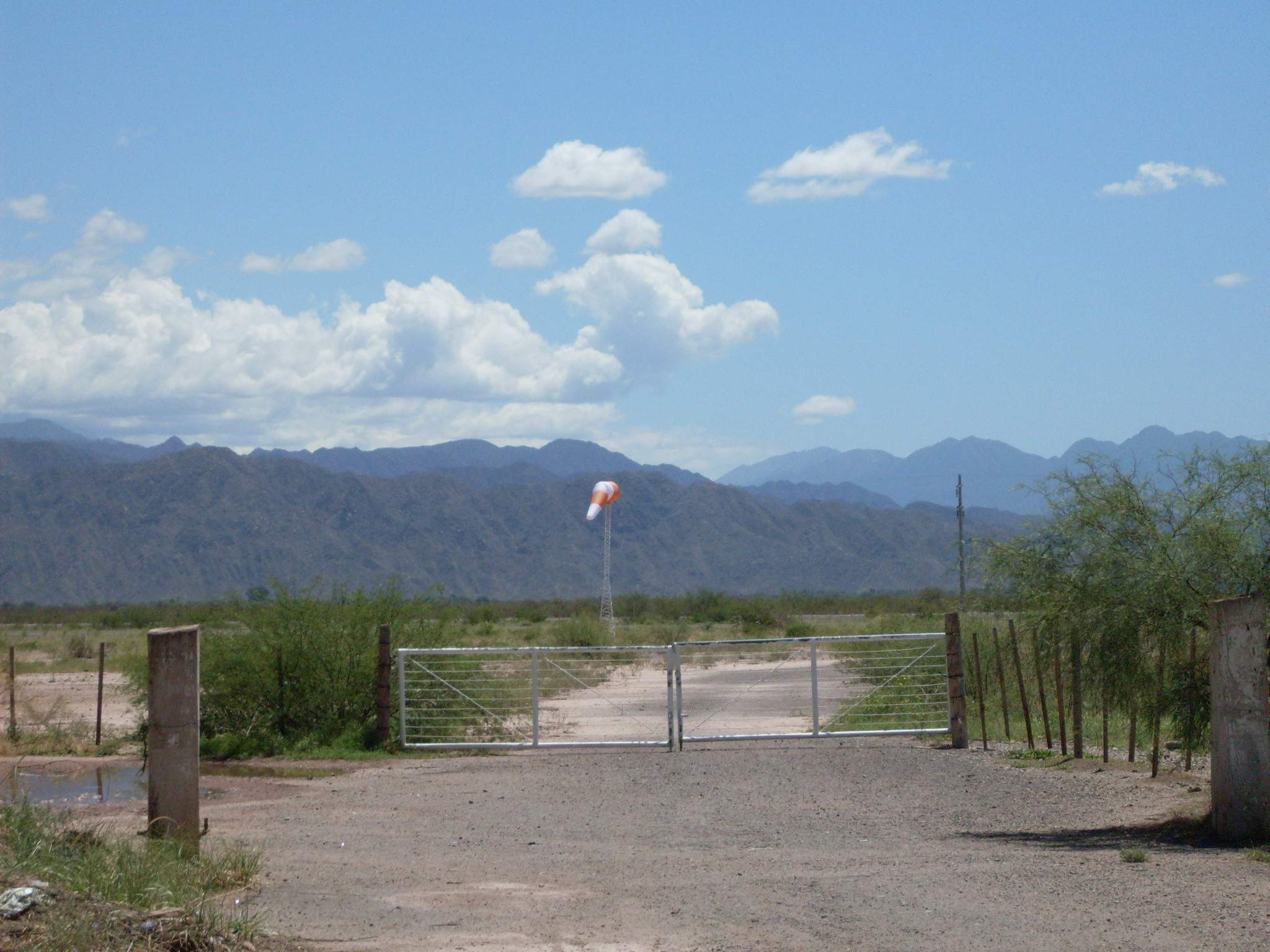

Santa Rosa (Tinogasta) is a town and municipality in Catamarca Province in northwestern Argentina.
