= Santa Rosa Canton =

- Canton
- Location of El Oro Province in Ecuador.

- Santa Rosa Canton in El Oro Province
- Coordinates: 3°27′8″S 79°57′42″W
- Country: Ecuador
- Province: El Oro Province

Area
  - Total: 897.1 km^{2} (346.4 sq mi)

Population (2022 census)
  - Total: 80,299
  - Density: 89.51/km^{2} (231.8/sq mi)
- Time zone: UTC-5 (ECT)

Santa Rosa Canton is a canton of Ecuador, located in the El Oro Province. Its capital is the town of Santa Rosa. Its population at the 2001 census was 60,388.

== Demographics ==
Ethnic groups as of the Ecuadorian census of 2010:

- Mestizo 83.6%
- Afro-Ecuadorian 7.2%
- White 6.6%
- Montubio 1.7%
- Indigenous 0.6%
- Other 0.3%
