= SM Nuvali =

Under construction shopping mall in Santa Rosa, Laguna, Philippines

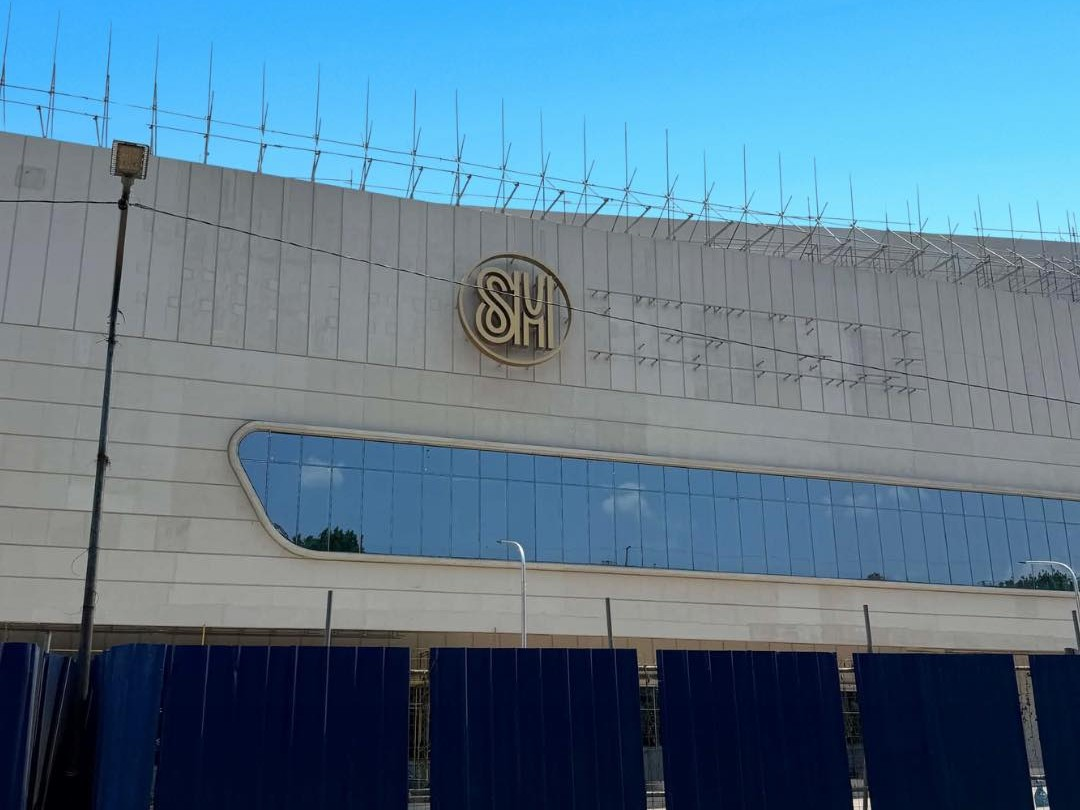
- The facade of the mall as of March 30, 2026
- Location: Santa Rosa, Laguna, Philippines
- Address: Santa Rosa–Tagaytay Road, Barangay Santo Domingo
- Opened: November 27, 2026; 5 days' time
- Previous names: SM Santa Rosa Yulo; SM Neo Verde
- Developer: SM Prime Holdings (under a brand license agreement with Ayala Land)
- Manager: SM Supermalls
- Architect: Arquitectonica International
- Num. of stores: TBA
- Floor area: 190,000 m^{2} (2,000,000 sq ft) (approximate)
- Floors: 5 levels (1 basement)
- Parking: TBA
- Website: www.smsupermalls.com

SM Nuvali is an under-construction shopping mall located along the Santa Rosa–Tagaytay Road in the Nuvali estate in Barangay Santo Domingo, Santa Rosa, Laguna. It is the fifth SM Supermall in the province of Laguna and the second SM Supermall in Santa Rosa, after SM City Santa Rosa. The mall is owned by SM Prime Holdings.

It is slated to open in November 27, 2026. Once opened, it will be the largest mall in the city and in the province, with a gross floor area of approximately 190,000 m^{2} (2,000,000 sq ft).

== Etymology ==
The mall was previously referred to as SM Santa Rosa Yulo or simply SM Yulo, derived from its location on the former Yulo Estate, an agricultural property associated with José Yulo, who acquired the nearby Canlubang Sugar Estate in 1948.

The project also carried the "Premier" branding, appearing as SM Santa Rosa Yulo Premier and SM Yulo Premier, until SM discontinued the branding across its malls in 2023. It was also informally referred to as SM City Santa Rosa 2, being the second SM Supermall in Santa Rosa.

In 2025, social media posts from construction workers at the site suggested that the mall may be named SM Neo Verde, a name derived from "new green" or "modified green" in Romance languages. However, this name has not been officially confirmed.

SM Supermalls announced that the mall's name is SM Nuvali, posted by a job hiring on the Facebook page of their sister mall, SM City Santa Rosa.

== History ==
In an interview with ABS-CBN News Channel (ANC), SM Supermalls President Steven Tan mentioned that the mall will be a "premier mall" with a one-hectare (2.5-acre) air-conditioned indoor garden at the center of the mall, where all the shops and restaurants will be looking into to cater the more affluent market in the high-end Nuvali territory.

== Mall features ==
SM Prime expects the new four-level mall to rise as a new lifestyle landmark in the city. Unlike its sister mall, SM City Santa Rosa, which has an attraction at the center of the main mall called The Rainforest, the mall will feature a one-hectare (2.5-acre) air-conditioned garden in the middle of the mall. It will also feature 24 EV charging stations at the basement parking, as well as solar panels on top of the mall, similar to SM City Santa Rosa’s Expansion Wing. It will also feature a Roman Catholic chapel called Chapel of Our Lady of the Most Holy Rosary.

=== Dining ===
SM Nuvali features a variety of world-class restaurants seen in other premier malls.

The mall is expected to have an upscale food hall with gourmet dining options instead of a traditional foodcourt found in most SM malls. It will be the third SM mall in South Luzon (after SM City Legazpi and SM City Naga) and the first SM mall in Calabarzon with a Food Hall branding. The Food Hall is integrated within the SM Game Park describing as a "flagship eat-and-play" experience which is similar to the concept of the foodcourt and Game Park integrated together in SM City East Ortigas.

=== Book Nook ===
A Book Nook community library will be opening on the mall's second floor. It is the first Book Nook branch outside Metro Manila.

=== Tenants ===
==== Retail ====
The mall will also house SM Supermarket and SM Store as anchor tenants. SM Supermarket will be on the lower ground level, while the SM Store will have two floors located on the upper ground and second levels.

The mall will host a full-scale Disney Store. It is the first branch outside of Metro Manila (though SM Seaside City launched a pop-up Disney Store from May 15 to July 14, 2026) and the third location in the country after SM Mall of Asia and SM North EDSA.

=== Cinemas ===
The mall is expected to have seven state-of-the-art cinemas located at the third floor including:

- Four regular cinemas equipped with laser projection systems and Dolby Surround 7.1
- IMAX with Laser (marking the first IMAX location in South Luzon) with their latest single-laser model paired with 6-channel precise audio.
- Two Director's Club cinemas equipped with LED screens paired with Dolby Atmos, marking the first LED-screen cinema in the country.

=== SM Game Park ===
The mall will feature SM Game Park as its main amusement center on the second floor. It is the second SM Game Park location in Laguna after SM City Santa Rosa. Unlike its sister location in SM City Santa Rosa, this location doesn't have bowling lanes, but will only feature archery, billiards, darts, and similar games. The Game Park is also integrated within the Food Hall.

== Mall complex developments ==
=== Park Inn ===
SM Hotels and Conventions Corp. (SMHCC), the hospitality subsidiary of SM Prime Holdings Inc., is building a new Park Inn by Raddison hotel near the mall. The ₱1.5-billion project is scheduled to open in the first quarter of 2029. The hotel will feature 201 guest rooms and be situated within an integrated SM Prime development.

=== SMX Convention Center Santa Rosa ===
SMX Convention Center Santa Rosa will be situated in the Park Inn building and will be connected to the mall via a bridgeway.

=== NV Tower ===
The NV Tower (also known as the Neo Verde Tower) is a 20-story office building developed by SM Offices, a subsidiary of SM Prime Holdings, located within the SM Nuvali complex. Designed by Arquitectonica, the building has a total gross floor area of 35,086.5 square meters (377,668 sq ft). It is physically connected via a pedestrian bridgeway to the mall. Construction of the tower is scheduled for completion in 2027. The tower is expected to be the tallest building in the province of Laguna.

== Incidents ==
- April 13, 2025: At around 10:30 a.m. PHT, a scaffolding in the under-construction mall collapsed, burying two workers who were pouring concrete on the second floor, according to police. Both were rushed to the hospital upon retrieval but were declared dead later that night. Following the incident, Santa Rosa Mayor Arlene Arcillas ordered the suspension of the construction, as the Office of the City Building Official and the City Engineering Office would inspect the construction site.

Preceded by SM City Zamboanga	91st SM Supermall; 2026	Succeeded by TBA
