= Santa Rosa Integrated Terminal =

Bus station in Laguna, Philippines

Coordinates: 14°18′39″N 121°5′57″E

Santa Rosa Integrated Terminal SM City Santa Rosa Transport Terminal

General information
- Location: SM City Santa Rosa, National Highway, Tagapo, Santa Rosa, Laguna; Philippines
- System: Intermodal
- Owner: SM Prime
- Operator: Supermalls Transport Services, Inc.
- Connections: Jeepneys and tricycles along National Highway

Construction
- Structure type: At-grade
- Parking: Yes (SM City Santa Rosa)
- Cycle facilities: Yes
- Accessible: yes

History
- Opened: March 26, 2019; 7 years ago
Location

The Santa Rosa Integrated Terminal (SRIT), also known as the SM City Santa Rosa Transport Terminal, is a bus station in SM City Santa Rosa in Santa Rosa, Laguna, Philippines. It is the second of three planned provincial intermodal terminals for the south of Manila under a public-private partnership arrangement. Opened on March 26, 2019, the terminal handles province-bound and incoming buses from Calabarzon and the Bicol Region, as well as other provincial buses plying the nautical highway in the south pending the completion of, and as an alternative to, the Taguig Integrated Terminal Exchange.

== Location ==
The Santa Rosa Integrated Terminal is located on a former parking lot of SM City Santa Rosa, a shopping mall on the Manila South Road (National Highway) in Barangay Tagapo, adjacent to Santa Rosa's poblacion (Malusak) and close to the city's border with Biñan. It is directly connected to SM City Santa Rosa and is located just south of another shopping mall, Robinsons Santa Rosa. Nearby landmarks include the future Park Residences of SM Development Corporation, Robinsons Sta. Rosa, Metrogate Subdivision, Centennial Garden, New Sinai MDI Hospital, the Santa Rosa Sports Complex, and Santa Rosa de Lima Parish Church. The terminal is about 2.5 kilometers (1.6 mi) north of the older Santa Rosa bus terminal in Balibago. The nearest rail transit station, the Santa Rosa railway station, is about midway between these two terminals.

== History ==
The transport terminal of SM City Santa Rosa beside the under-construction SRIT (left)

The proposal for a second integrated terminal in the southeast of Metro Manila was first submitted in October 2016 by Santa Rosa Mayor Dan Fernandez. A 9-hectare (22-acre) site on the Biñan–Santa Rosa Access Road was presented to Department of Transportation Secretary Arthur Tugade as an alternative to the Taguig Integrated Terminal Exchange. The proposed site was 2 kilometers (1.2 mi) east of the South Luzon Expressway Greenfield City-Unilab (Mamplasan) Interchange, which would also be the terminus of the Cavite–Laguna Expressway. It was modelled after an earlier contract signed in January 2016 for the South Integrated Transport System project also involving private investment.

The Santa Rosa terminal is part of the Metropolitan Manila Development Authority plan to reduce traffic congestion in Metro Manila by taking some 3,000 to 4,000 southbound provincial buses off its busy streets. It was one of eleven sites in the peripheries of Metro Manila and adjacent suburbs that were submitted to the Department of Transportation for consideration for development. Santa Rosa is one of three immediate suburbs of Metro Manila in Laguna covered by city bus services and where bus operators are permitted to serve city routes including EDSA. The proposed terminal would allow for travellers to continue to their destination in Metro Manila through either the South Luzon Expressway or the Manila–Cavite Expressway via the Cavite–Laguna Expressway, as well as through other forms of public transportation such as the Metro Commuter railways, UV Express vans, and jeepneys.

In March 2019, the Metro Manila Council approved MMDA Regulation No. 19-002 prohibiting the issuance or renewal of permits to all bus terminals on EDSA, with the objective of permanently closing down all terminals along Manila's main thoroughfare and the relocation of all provincial buses to the designated bus stations in the north and south of the region starting June 2019.

== Services ==
SRIT services the following routes:

=== Buses ===
==== Current ====
- ALPS The Bus, Inc. – operates provincial buses to and from the following destinations in Bicol Region: Naga City, Tabaco City and Legazpi City Western Visayas: Estancia, Iloilo City, Kalibo, Malay, Miagao, Palompon, Roxas City, and San Jose
- DLTBCo – operates provincial bus service to and from SM City Lucena, Catarman, Laoang (Rawis), Maasin, Ormoc, and Tacloban
- Philtranco – operates provincial bus service to and from Carigara (Sawang), Daet, Lidong, Naval, Ormoc, Prieto Diaz, Silago, and Tabaco/Legazpi

==== Former ====
- Between August 2020 and August 2022, Old Bus Routes 33 and 34 of the Metro Manila Rationalized Bus Transit operated to and from Ayala Center (Makati) and Parañaque Integrated Terminal Exchange (Parañaque), respectively. City Bus Routes operating to and from those said areas are currently terminating at Santa Rosa Commercial Complex in Balibago by the Newly-assigned Routes 11 (Merging with the Old Bus Route 35) and 30 respectively.

=== Jeepneys ===
- Traditional jeeps operate outside the station along the National Highway to Alabang, Muntinlupa, San Pedro, Biñan, Santa Rosa, Cabuyao, and Calamba.
