= St. Rose of Lima Cathedral, Carúpano =

St. Rose of Lima Cathedral
- Catedral Santa Rosa de Lima
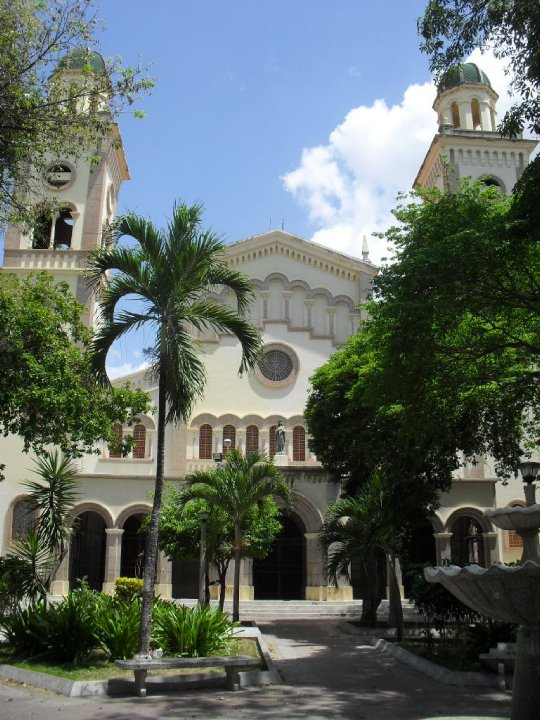
- St. Rose of Lima Cathedral
- Location: Carúpano
- Country: Venezuela
- Denomination: Roman Catholic Church

Administration
- Diocese: Roman Catholic Diocese of Carúpano

The St. Rose of Lima Cathedral (Spanish: Catedral de Santa Rosa de Lima de Carúpano) also called Carúpano Cathedral, is a Catholic cathedral protected as a historical monument located in the city of Carúpano, in the Paria Peninsula, Sucre State, in the South American country of Venezuela. The cathedral follows the Roman or Latin rite and serves as the seat of the Catholic Diocese of Carúpano.

It was built under invocation of Santa Rosa de Lima and belongs to the set of monuments Bermúdez Municipality since 1996 under Decree 8377 of 2 October of that year; in the category of "Historic Monument". The original cathedral was founded in 1742. The current church was built by Juan F. Serrano in the late fifties inspired by a mixed Romanesque style, replacing a smaller building. It has two towers, three ships and cruise, two domes and an apse. The last major change to the building was in 1959. It is consecrated in 1969 and declared a heritage site at the municipal level in 1996.

== See also ==
- List of cathedrals in Venezuela
- Roman Catholicism in Venezuela
- St. Rose of Lima Church

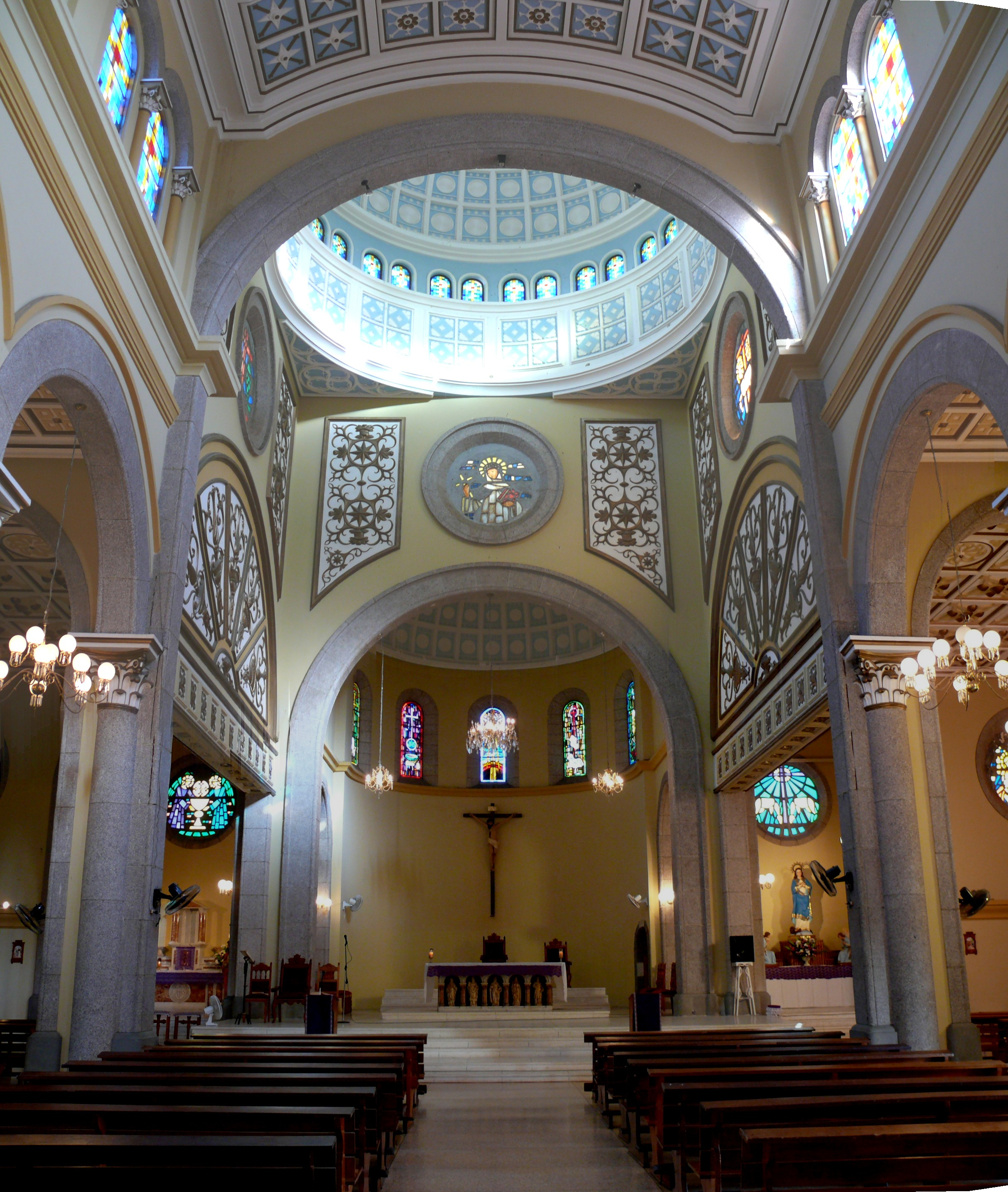
Internal View
