= Santa Rosa Department, Catamarca =

Santa Rosa Departamento Santa Rosa
- Department
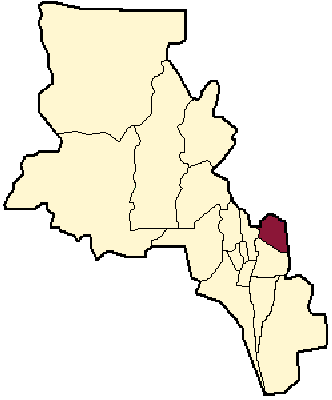
- location of Santa Rosa Department in Catamarca Province
- Coordinates: 28°6′S 65°19′W
- Country: Argentina
- Established: 1981
- Founder: provincial law
- Seat: Bañado de Ovanta

Government
  - Mayor: Julio Maza, FJ

Area
  - Total: 1,424 km^{2} (550 sq mi)

Population (2001 census [INDEC])
  - Total: 10,349
  - Density: 7.268/km^{2} (18.82/sq mi)
- Demonym: santaroseña/o
- Postal Code: K4723
- IFAM: CAT029
- Area Code: 03833
- Patron saint: Saint Rose
- Website: www.camsencat.gov.ar/starosa.html

Santa Rosa is a department of Catamarca Province in Argentina.

The provincial subdivision has a population of about 10,500 inhabitants in an area of 1,424 km^{2} (550 sq mi), and its capital city is Bañado de Ovanta.
