= Santa Rosa Department, Mendoza =

Santa Rosa Departamento Santa Rosa
- Department
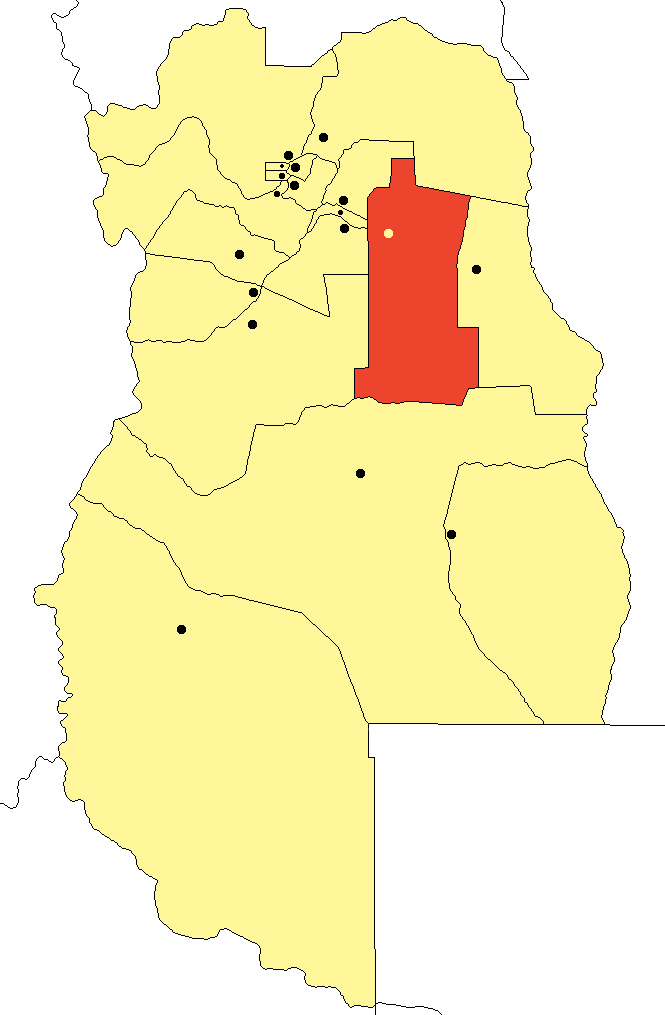
- location of Santa Rosa Department in Mendoza Province
- Coordinates: 33°17′S 68°02′W
- Country: Argentina
- Established: April 17, 1874
- Founder: ?
- Seat: Santa Rosa

Government
  - Intendant: Flor Destéfanis, PJ

Area
  - Total: 8,510 km^{2} (3,290 sq mi)

Population (2022 census [INDEC])
  - Total: 19,382
  - Density: 2.28/km^{2} (5.90/sq mi)
- Demonym: santaroseño/a
- Postal Code: M5596
- IFAM: MZA016
- Area Code: 02623
- Patron saint: ?
- Website: no

Santa Rosa is a department located in the centre of Mendoza Province in Argentina.

The provincial subdivision has a population of about 16,000 inhabitants in an area of 8,510 km^{2} (3,290 sq mi), and its capital city is Santa Rosa, which is located around 975 km (606 mi) from the Federal Capital.

== Districts ==
- La Dormida
- Las Catitas
- Santa Rosa
- 12 de Octubre
