= SM Megamall =

Shopping mall in Mandaluyong, Philippines

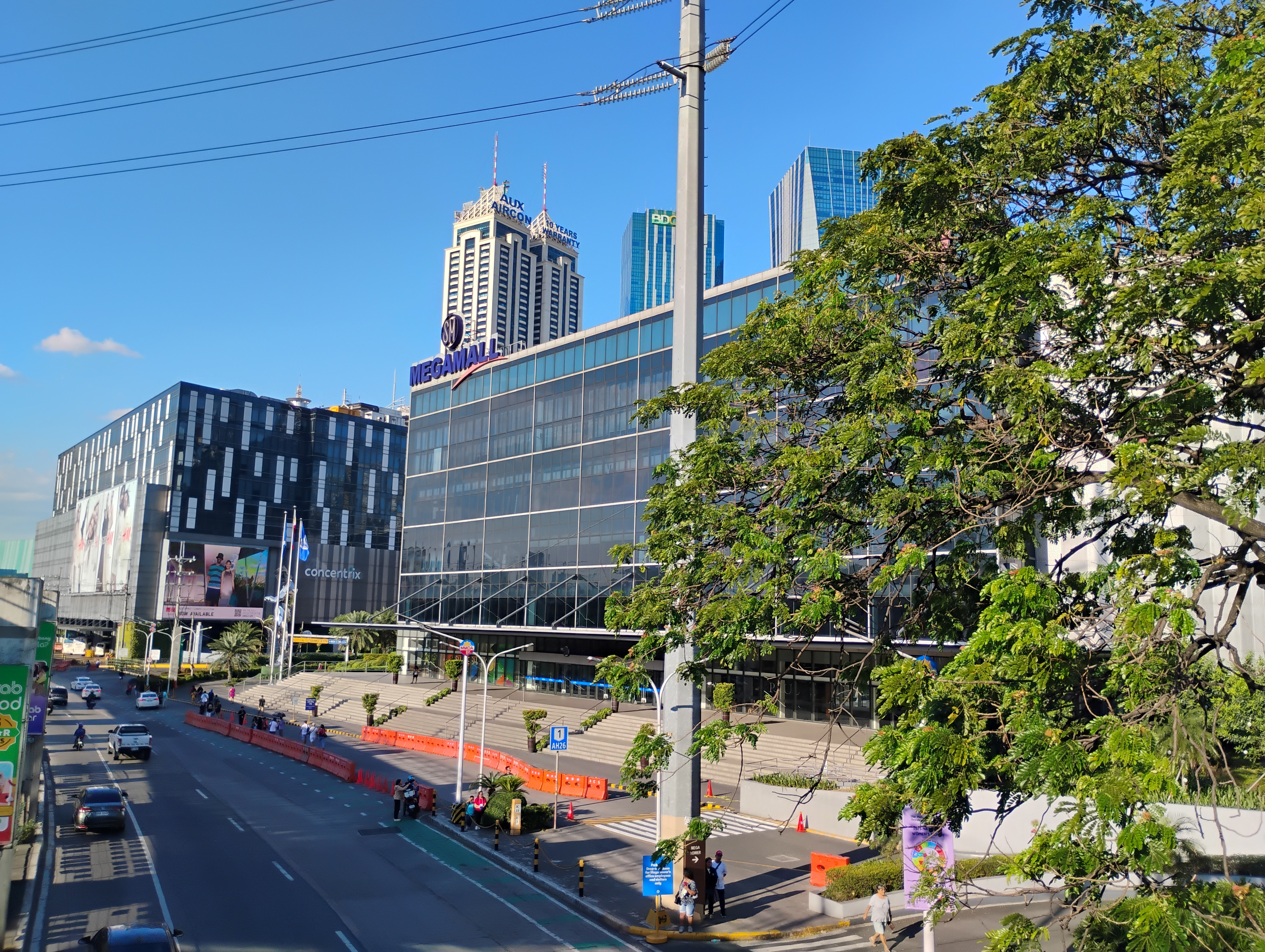
- SM Megamall in April 2025
- Location: Wack-Wack Greenhills, Mandaluyong, Metro Manila, Philippines
- Coordinates: 14°35′04.01″N 121°03′24.38″E
- Address: EDSA corner Julia Vargas Avenue, Ortigas Center
- Opened: June 28, 1991; 35 years ago
- Developer: SM Prime Holdings
- Manager: SM Prime Holdings
- Architect: Antonio Sindiong & Arquitectonica; Benoy (redesign)
- Num. of stores: 1,204 shops, including over 500 retail shops and over 280 dining outlets
- Num. of anchor tenants: 18
- Floor area: 474,000 m^{2} (5,100,000 sq ft)
- Floors: Mega A & B: 5 (+ 1 basement level); Mega C: 11 upper + 2 basement (Parking at B1, LG, 2F-7F); Mega Fashion Hall (Mega D): 5 + 2-level basement carpark
- Parking: 3,161 slots
- Public transit: Provincial buses, UV Express; Ortigas; Shaw Boulevard; E SM Megamall
- Website: SM Megamall

SM Megamall, formerly known as SM Megamall Ortigas and colloquially known as Megamall, is a large shopping mall located in Ortigas Center, Mandaluyong, Philippines, developed and operated by SM Prime Holdings. Opened in 1991, it is the third SM Supermall, after SM North EDSA and SM City Sta. Mesa. It is the fourth largest shopping mall in the Philippines and one of the largest malls in the world. The mall occupies a land area of approximately 10 hectares (25 acres) and has a total floor area of 474,000 square meters (5,100,000 sq ft). The mall has a maximum capacity of 4 million people attracting over 350,000 shoppers on weekdays and over 500,000 shoppers on weekends.

== History ==
Henry Sy Sr. through First Asia Realty loaned ₱1 billion from the Philippine National Bank and Citibank, an unprecedented amount at the time, in April 1989 to fund the development of SM Megamall. The mall began construction in 1989 and opened its doors on June 28, 1991. It was the third SM Supermall built after SM City Sta. Mesa and SM North EDSA. SM Megamall was the largest mall in the country for a 17-year period, but when the SM Mall of Asia opened in 2006, it was ranked third largest in the country by floor area at that time, measuring 331,679 m^{2} (3,570,160 sq ft) of total retail floor area and after SM City North EDSA (which ranked first in the country and second in the world). It also boasted the first ice skating rink, which was removed from Building A in 2009 but was replaced by the new skating rink at the Mega Fashion Hall in 2014, as well as the Megatrade Hall, one of the first trade halls in the country. The new ice skating rink was the venue for the speed skating and figure skating at the 2019 Southeast Asian Games.

Since its inception in 1991, SM Megamall expanded with the addition of the Mega Atrium in 2008, Building C in 2011 and the Mega Fashion Hall in 2014, bringing the total retail floor area to 474,000 m^{2} (5,100,000 sq ft). In 2018, SM partnered with Cal-Comp Technology (Philippines) Inc. for the provision of its New Era AI (Artificial Intelligence) Robotic service robots stationed at SM Megamall by the first quarter of 2019.

== Location ==
The mall is located in the Ortigas Center, one of Metro Manila's premier central business districts and shopping hubs, at the portion encompassed by Mandaluyong City. It stands along the main EDSA (C-4 segment) thoroughfare and Julia Vargas Avenue. The mall is almost adjacent to the Ortigas MRT-3 station and EDSA Carousel's Ortigas station, as well as the Shaw Boulevard MRT-3 station. The mall is also located to nearby malls such as the Robinsons Galleria, St. Francis Square, The Podium, the Shangri-La Plaza, and Starmall EDSA Shaw and landmarks such as the Asian Development Bank Headquarters, Saint Pedro Poveda College, University of Asia and the Pacific, BDO Corporate Center, The Podium West Tower and the San Miguel Corporation Headquarters.

== Facilities ==
=== Main mall ===
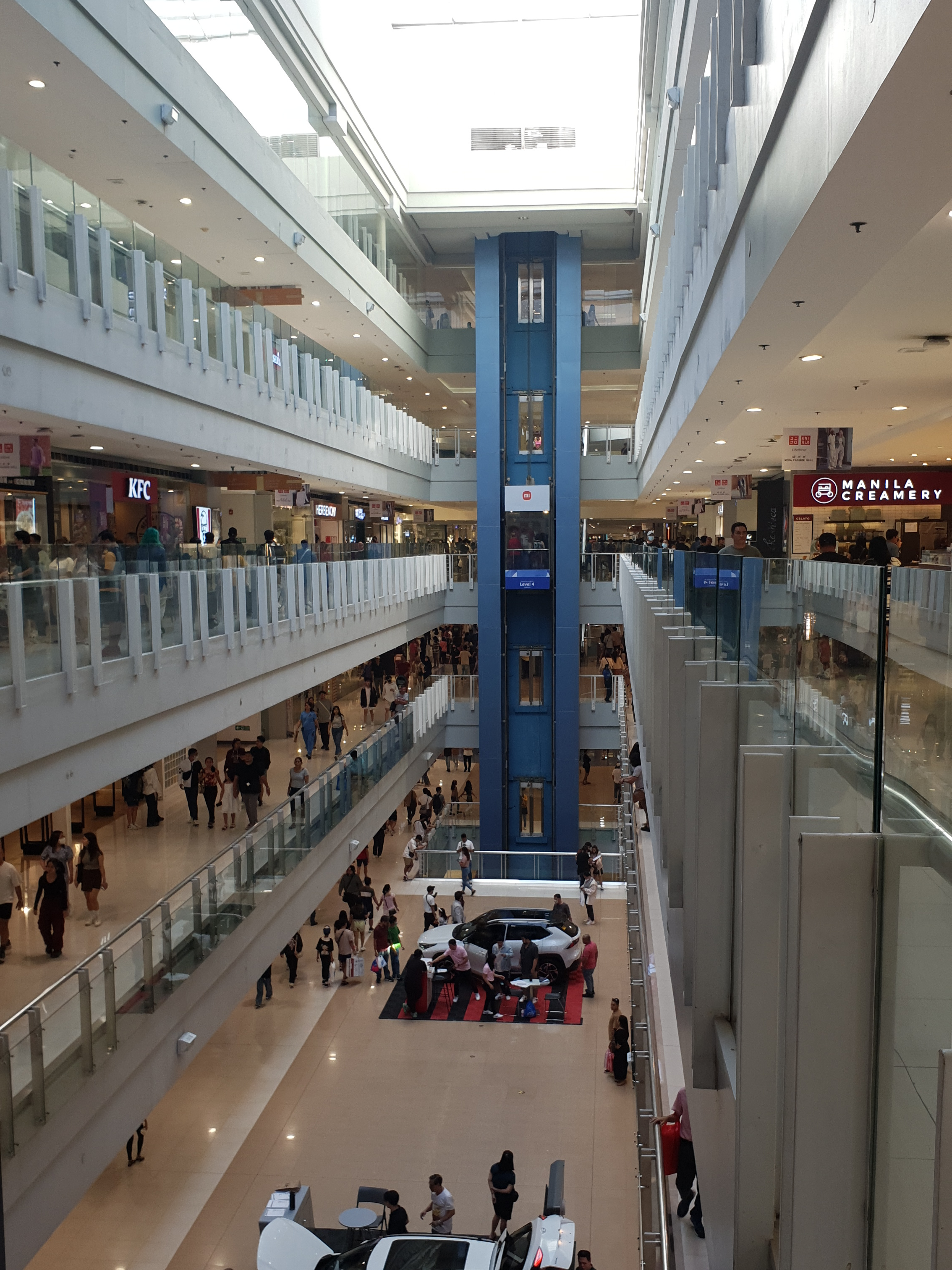
Building B atrium

The mall has two main buildings, separated by Julia Vargas Avenue. Building A, the northern structure, features 12 digital cinemas (6 of which are currently operational due to an ongoing renovation) on the third floor, a Toy Kingdom on the lower ground floor, and art stores on the fifth floor. It also features Forever 21 located on the second level of Building A. On the other hand, Building B, the southern structure, features SM Store, an Ace Hardware store on the lower ground floor, the Cyberzone on the fourth floor, and the Megatrade Hall (operated by SMX Convention Center) on the fifth floor. It has been expanded and has direct connections with the Mega Fashion Hall, which opened on January 28, 2014. The SM Supermarket and multi-level parking are featured on both buildings. The bridgeway connecting the two main buildings contains several restaurants.

=== Mega Atrium ===
The 16,000 m^{2} (170,000 sq ft) Mega Atrium is an addition to Buildings A and B completed in 2008. It features Chapel of the Eucharistic Lord, a 1,585 m^{2} (17,060 sq ft) Roman Catholic chapel on the fifth floor, as well as various shops and restaurants. The atrium also features the Garden at Mega Atrium, an indoor garden located within the second floor.

=== Building C ===
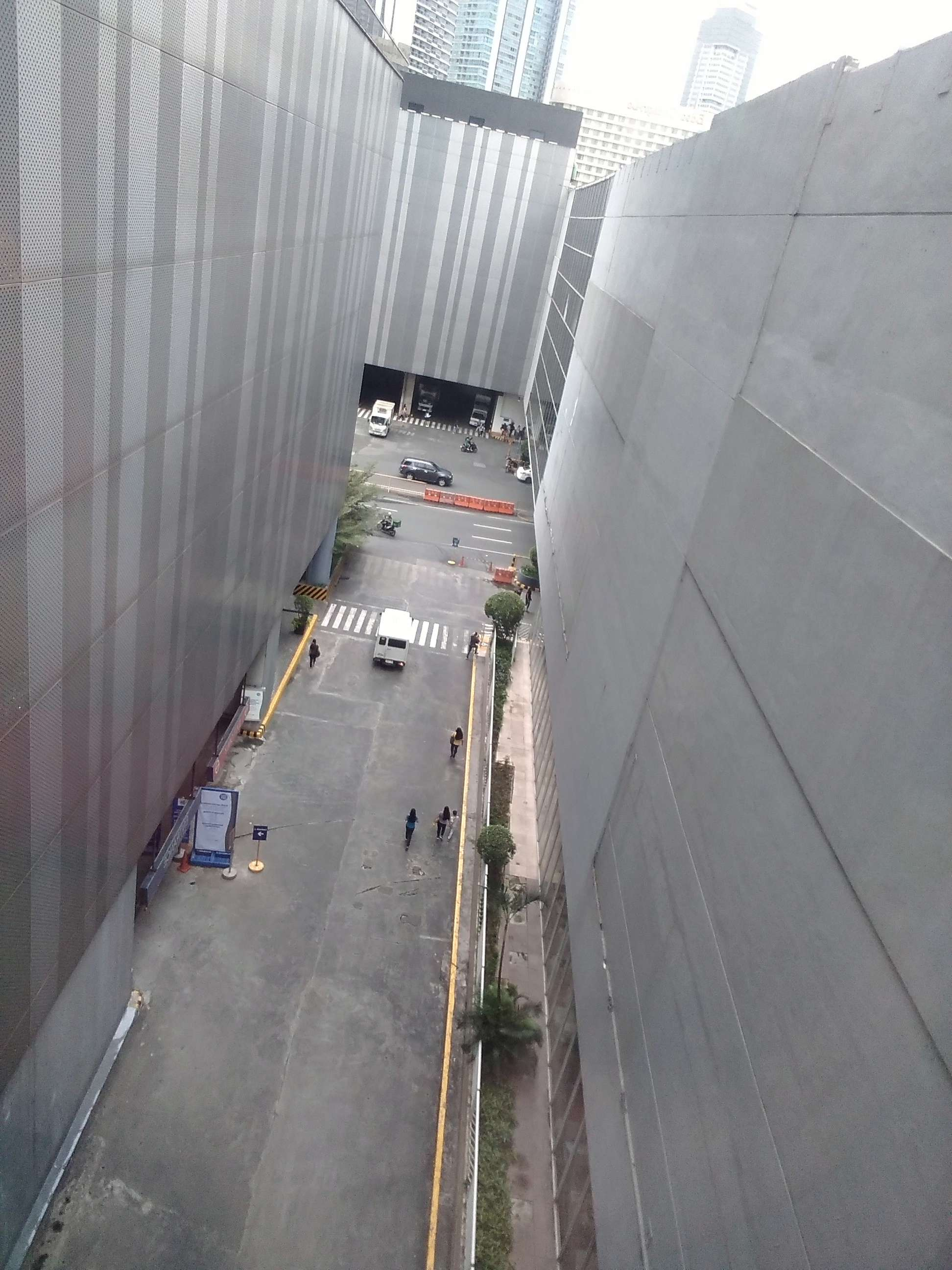
A driveway between Building C and the Main Mall

Building C is a 11-storey mixed-use building that houses office spaces on the upper levels from the eight floor to the eleventh floor, which are entirely occupied by Concentrix; carpark spaces from the building's second level to the sixth level; and a transport terminal at the ground level, which includes an integrated bus terminal for point-to-point buses plying Batangas and Alabang and minibuses plying Binangonan, respectively. The terminal was previously served by city buses plying EDSA prior to the introduction of EDSA Busway system in 2020. Formerly Building A's open-parking facility, it is located near EDSA to the west of Building A and was opened on October 11, 2011. The building also contains the 1,300-square-meter (14,000 ft^{2}) DFA CO NCR-East, the first passport office of the Department of Foreign Affairs in Metro Manila which opened in August 2012.

=== Mega Fashion Hall (Building D) ===
A drone shot of the Mega Fashion Hall (2026)

The Mega Fashion Hall features a two-level basement parking and a five-level mall with 86,000 m^{2} (930,000 sq ft) of retail, it houses several global clothing retailers, an events hall, and additional restaurants and shops, including the three-level H&M store and the three-level Uniqlo which extends to the two uppermost levels of Building B. Aside from clothing stores, the expansion includes dining establishments, houseware stores, service shops, and a bingo area on the fifth level. The Mega Fashion Hall also houses an IMAX Digital theater (the eighth IMAX cinema in the country), a 56-seat Director's Club Cinema with butler service, an Olympic-sized ice skating rink (replacing the one removed in 2009 from the lower-ground level of Building A), an upscale food court (Mega Food Hall), and a 14-lane bowling center, the SM Bowling Center (also replacing the one removed in 2009 from the lower-ground level of Building A, now Toy Kingdom). The building also features the BTS Pop-Up Store, located at the mall's third floor, and showcases over 400 BTS-branded products.

==== Time Sculpture ====
The Time Sculpture is a sculpture located fronting the Mega Fashion Hall. The sculpture was unveiled on August 2, 2021, and is designed by Filipino-American public artist Jefre Manuel Figueras, also known as JEFRË, and was made of stainless steel. The sculpture is part of the Baks "Box" Series, where he gives representation to people living in cities around the world, and resembles a man looking at his watch, which serves as reminder how time is important in our lives and to make use of time in traffic productively. JEFRË also converted the statue's head to a block, which connects the figures to surrounding urban architecture, and strengthens the image that people are a city's major component as the building blocks and the bloodline of the city.

== Expansion ==
After the soft opening of Building C in 2011, the mall surpassed SM Mall of Asia by 2,000 m^{2} (22,000 sq ft) and became the second largest shopping mall in the country.

With the opening of the Mega Fashion Hall (Building D), the current gross leasable area is 500,000 m^{2} (5,400,000 sq ft), allowing the mall to reclaim the title of the largest mall in the Philippines.

The addition of the Mega Fashion Hall building added 125 new retail stores, 90% of which are global brands and 10% of which are local retailers.

In an announcement made by SM Supermalls President Steven Tan in June 2024, SM Supermalls announced that SM Megamall would begin its redevelopment in July 2024, ultimately adding up to 20,000 square meters (220,000 sq ft) of leasable space and 1,000 parking lots. Parts of Building A have been demolished to make way for the new redevelopment. The project is designed by Benoy, an international architectural firm that designed the Jewel Changi Airport in Singapore and the Iconsiam in Bangkok, Thailand, and will also include modernized interiors and exteriors inspired from a "country of a thousand islands" concept with "Crystal Islands" inspired interiors, a modernized food court and cinemas, and a rooftop sky garden with al-fresco dining spaces, seating spaces, and an ETFE roofing system at the mall's fifth floor, which allows natural light to enter the building. The construction started in 2026, and will finish it by the 2030s.

== Mega Tower ==
SM Mega Tower

A 50-storey 249.7 m (819 ft) office tower, named The Mega Tower, is located next to the Mega Fashion Hall in an area formerly occupied by an open carpark. The S-shaped tower is directly connected to the Mega Fashion Hall and features three levels of basement parking. Mega Tower has a leasable area of 124,200 m^{2} (1,337,000 sq ft). Groundbreaking began in March 2016, while the tower's construction phase began six months later on the same year, in September 2016. The tower was topped off in March 2020, and was opened in 2021 with Australian BPO ConnectOS signing as a major foundation tenant in 2022. The administration offices of the mall are located in the tower, after giving way for the mall's redevelopment.

Arquitectonica is the firm responsible for the architectural design, while Aurecon serves as the tower's structural engineer consultant and New Golden City Builders serve as the general contractor for the project.

== Gallery ==
SM Megamall after expansion and renovation in 2014

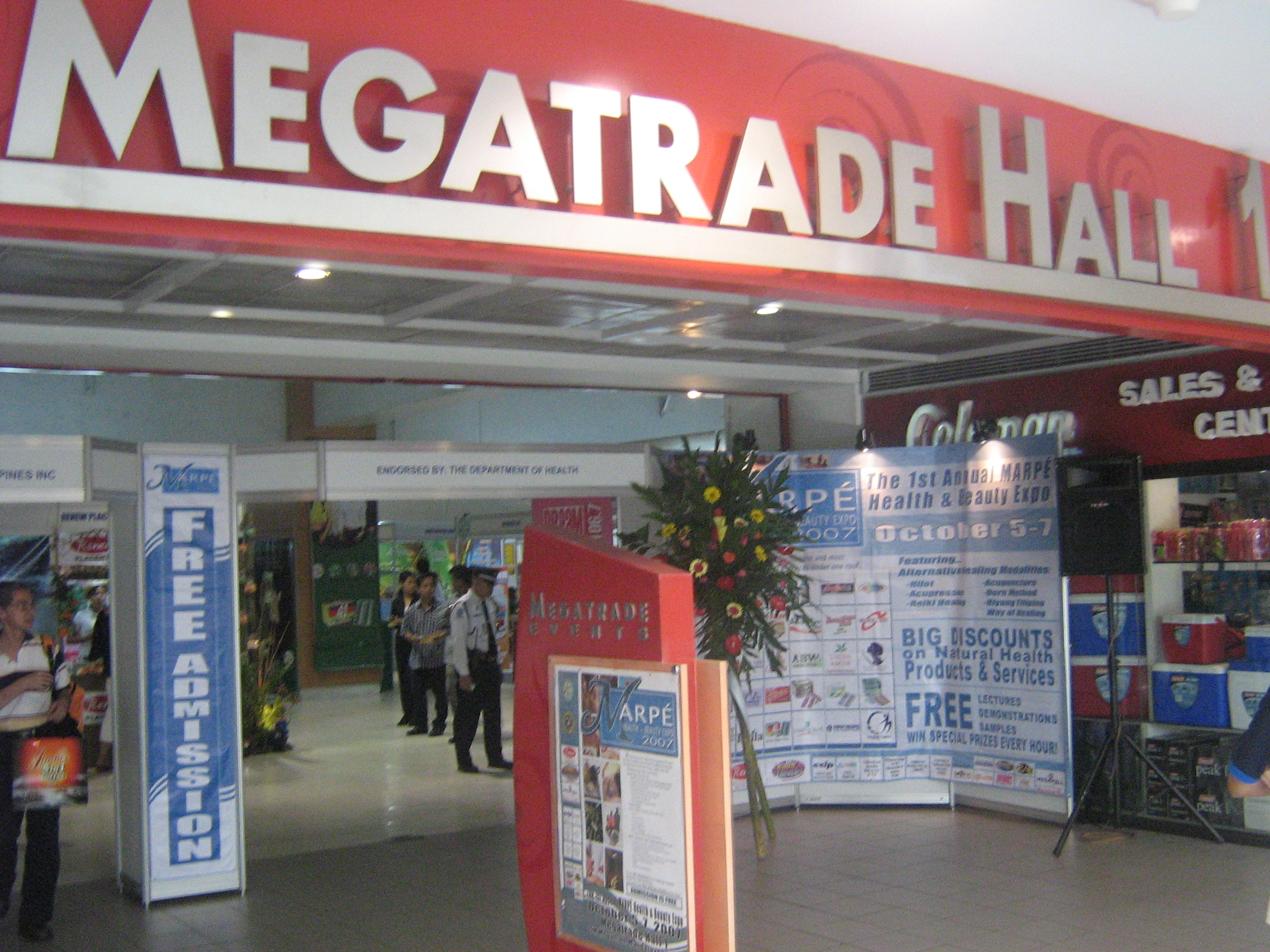
Megatrade Hall in 2007

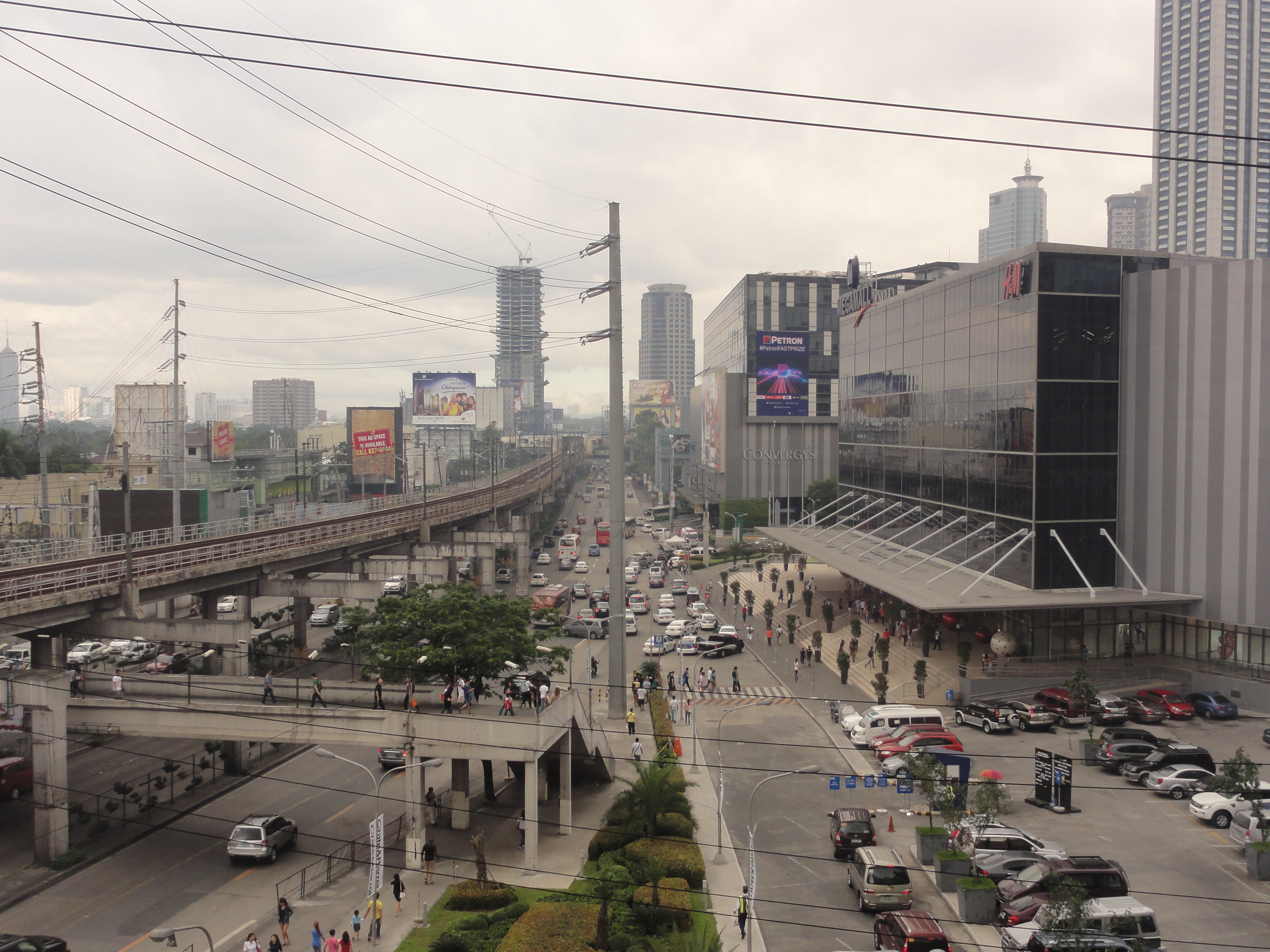
View within EDSA (2014)

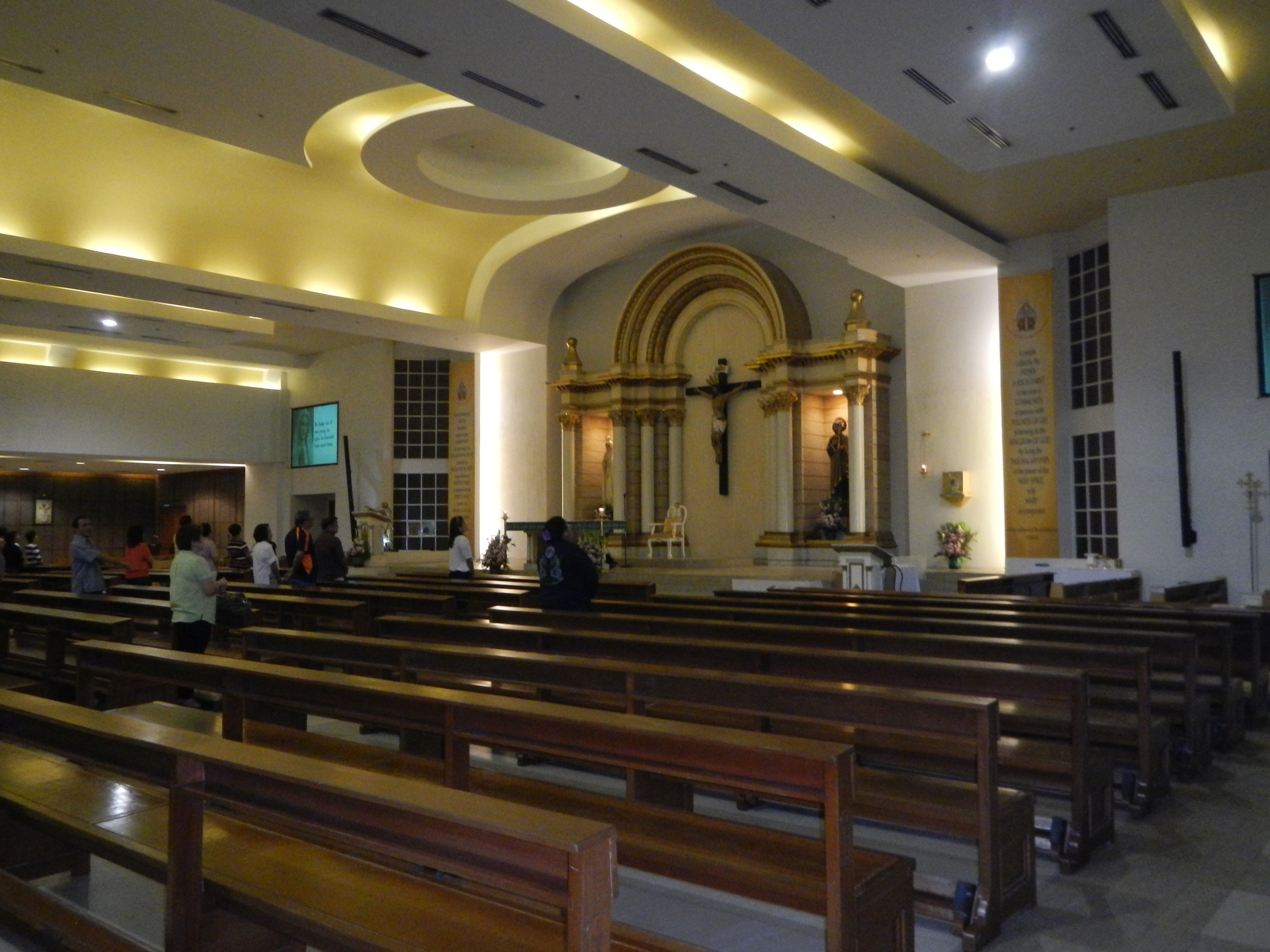
Chapel of the Eucharistic Lord

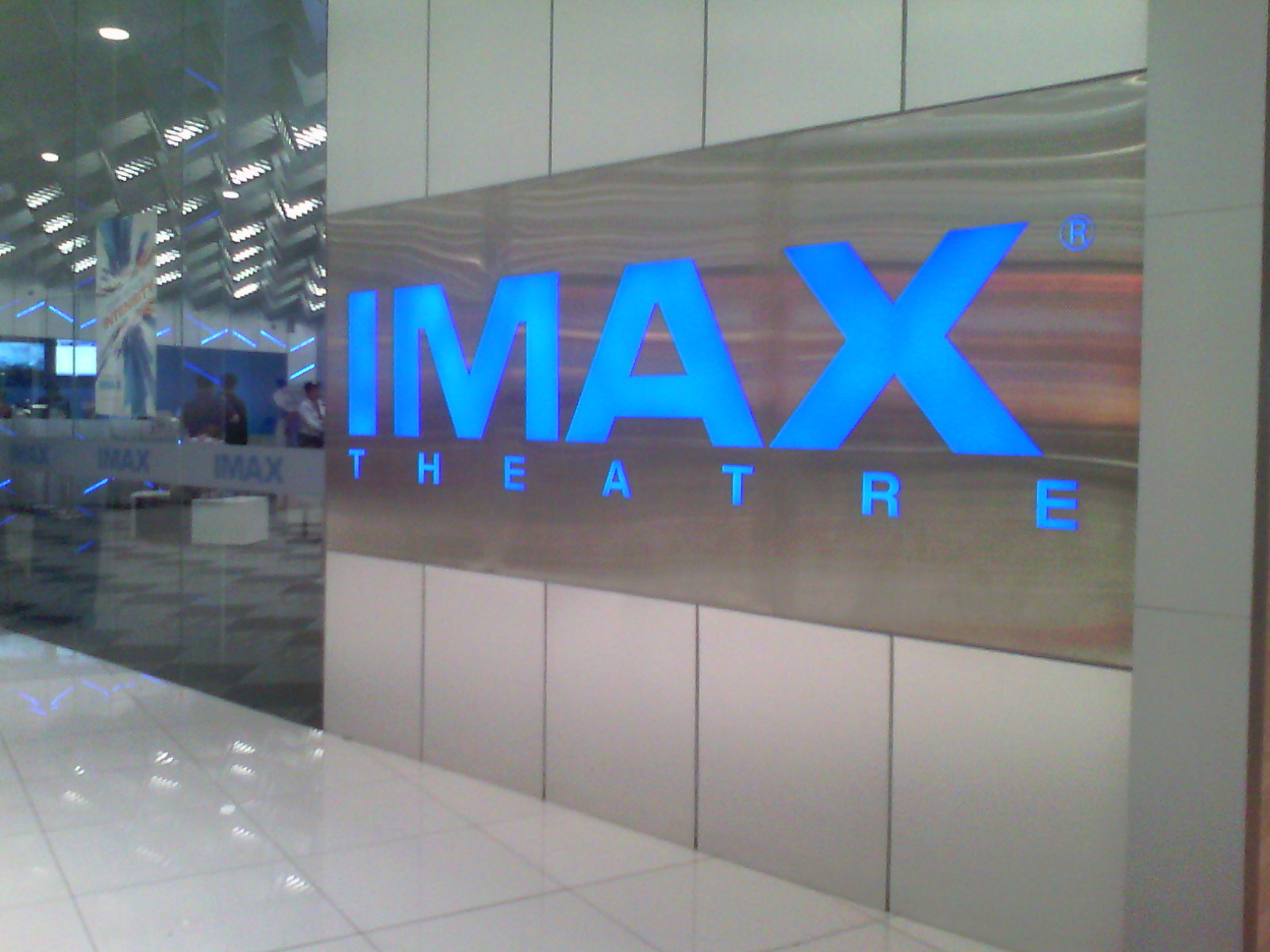
IMAX Theatre

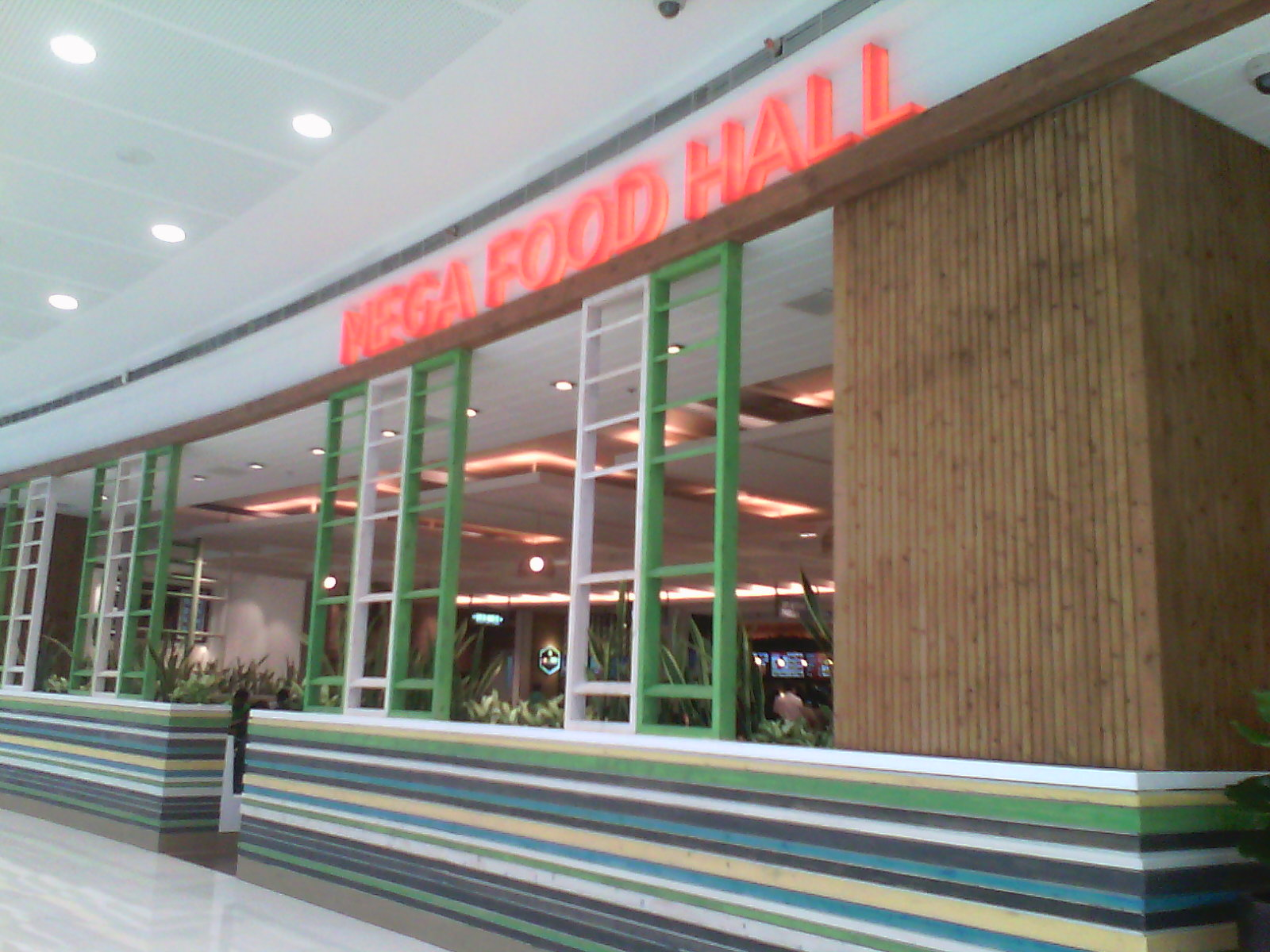
Mega Food Hall

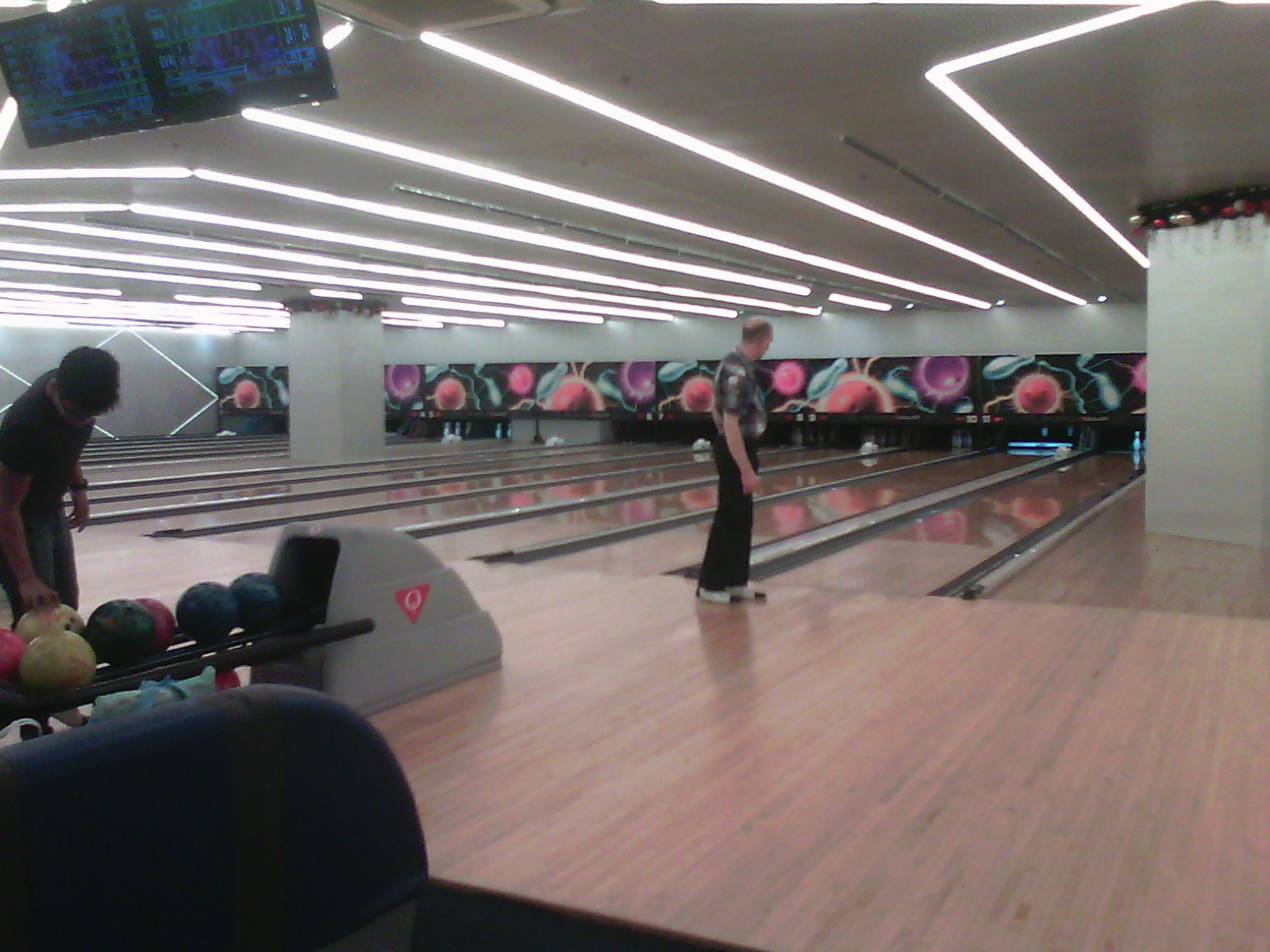
SM Bowling Center

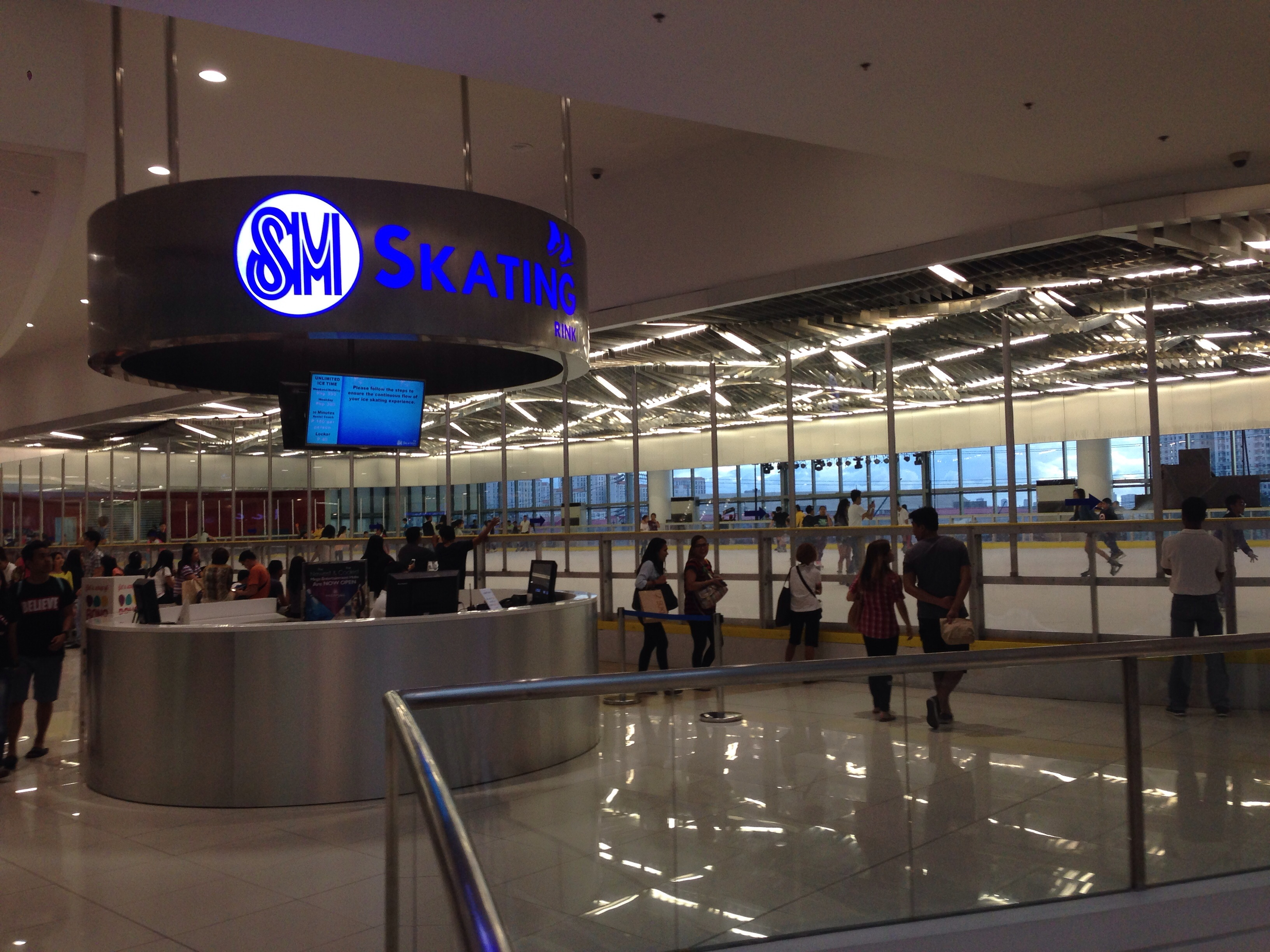
SM Skating Rink

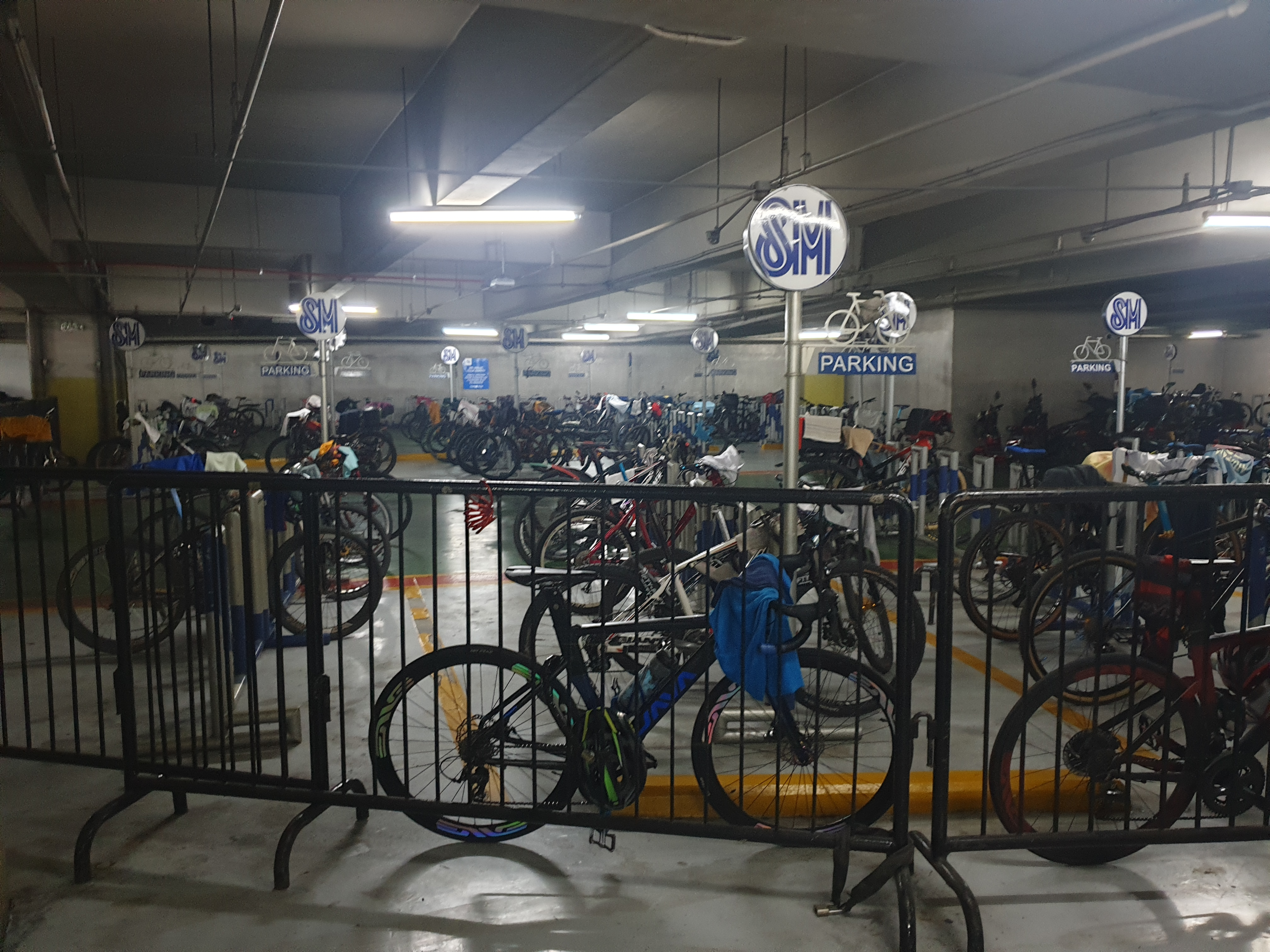
Bicycle parking at Mega Fashion Hall

== Incidents and accidents ==
Note: Times are Philippine Standard Time (UTC+8).

=== Mega A and Mega B ===
- On May 21, 2000, a bomb exploded inside a restroom at the mall's Cinema 6, located on the third floor. One person was killed and dozens were injured. Two of the victims sustained very serious injuries. The bombing occurred four days after the Glorietta 2 bombing, which wounded 13 people.
- On January 26, 2013, a holdup and shootout occurred when the Martilyo Gang, a local criminal group specializing in robbing stores by smashing and stealing valuables using hammers, robbed a jewelry store in the department store on the first floor.
- On May 5, 2013, an explosion briefly caused panic at the food court at Building A, with at least one reported hurt in a stampede before shoppers were able to calm down after learning the sounds were not gunshots. A siomai steamer was short-circuited and caused people to file out at around 7:25 PM.
- On February 14, 2016, a 48-year-old woman jumped to her death from the fifth floor of Building B of the mall upon learning that her female partner was entertaining a suitor. She was rushed to The Medical City Ortigas, where she was declared dead on arrival.
- On October 23, 2016, an 18-year-old college student jumped to her death from the fifth floor of Building B of the mall after being reprimanded by her relatives for posting a video on social media of herself kissing her underage girlfriend. She was rushed to The Medical City Ortigas but was declared dead on arrival.
- On June 5, 2022, a hit and run incident happened at the intersection of Julia Vargas Avenue and Bank Drive located behind the mall when a Toyota RAV4 driver ran over and severely injured a security guard directing traffic, then fled the scene. Three weeks later, the driver publicly apologized at a press conference arranged by the Philippine National Police at Camp Crame. The Land Transportation Office permanently revoked the driver's license and charges of frustrated murder were filed against him in the Mandaluyong City Trial Court.

=== Building C ===
- On May 16, 2021, a fire broke out in Building C of the mall at 3:36 AM. The fire was put out 19 minutes later.

=== Mega Fashion Hall ===
- On December 17, 2024, a security guard was recorded shooing a sampaguita vendor, also a college student, outside the Mega Fashion Hall and then destroying her garlands. The vendor responded by hitting the guard with the damaged garlands, prompting further retaliation from the guard. The incident led to the guard's dismissal and employment ban at all SM Supermalls, as well as an administrative case to be filed against him by the Philippine National Police. It went viral in January 2025.

=== Mega Tower ===
- On June 29, 2018, a fire hit the under-construction SM Mega Tower at around 7:30 PM. It was declared "fire out" at around 6 hours later, at 1:30 AM on the next day. The Metropolitan Manila Development Authority (MMDA) had announced in a tweet at 8:16 PM on Thursday that the blaze had already reached the third alarm. This meant that up to nine fire trucks should be deployed.
- On September 2, 2021, a fire hit the 27th floor of the under-construction SM Mega Tower around 10:26 AM, causing people in the building to be reportedly trapped. 96 people were rescued, with two people reported as injured.

== See also ==
- List of shopping malls in Metro Manila

Preceded by SM City Sta. Mesa	3rd SM Supermall; 1991	Succeeded by SM City Cebu
