= Mega Tower =

- The Mega Tower, taken last 2021.
- Interactive map of the Mega Tower area

General information
- Status: Completed
- Type: Office
- Location: EDSA corner Julia Vargas Avenue, Ortigas Center, Wack-Wack Greenhills, Mandaluyong, Metro Manila, Philippines
- Coordinates: 14.5830°N 121.0556°E
- Construction started: 2016
- Completed: 2021
- Opening: 2021
- Owner: First Asia Realty Development Corporation
- Operator: SM Prime Holdings

Height
- Roof: 249.7 m (819.23 ft)

Technical details
- Floor count: 50
- Floor area: 112,000 m^{2} (1,205,557.97 sq ft)
- Lifts/elevators: 24

Design and construction
- Architecture firm: Arquitectonica
- Developer: SM Prime Holdings
- Structural engineer: Aurecon
- Main contractor: New Golden City Builders

The Mega Tower is a 50-storey high-rise office building located within the SM Megamall complex at the Ortigas Center in Mandaluyong, Metro Manila. Located along the southwestern area of the complex, the tower serves as a part of the complex's development master plan. Standing at 249.7 m (819.23 ft), the tower was proposed in 2014 and was completed in 2021. The tower is a Grade-A office tower and features an S-shaped curvilinear, all-glass design and has a total floor area of 112,000 m^{2} (1,205,557.97 sq ft).

== History ==
The Mega Tower was initially proposed in November 2014 as part of the SM Megamall development master plan, a multi-phase development plan aimed to expand the mall's retail spaces and construct an office tower located along the mall's former open parking lot on Garden Way and the Wack Wack Creek. The plan also follows the proposals made by SM Prime Holdings for the development of two new office buildings within its mall developments, with the second office building development later being known as the North Towers located at SM North EDSA. In December 2015, the plans of the tower was finalized and SM Prime Holdings officially announced the development of the tower. Arquitectonica was tapped as the project's architectural firm, while Aurecon was named as the project's structural engineer and will also be in charge for the tower's concept design, schematic design, design development and construction documentation review phases. New Golden City Builders was named as the project's general contractor.

The former open parking lot was closed on early 2016 and fencing activities later followed. Ground-breaking activities for the construction of the tower began in March 2016. Piling works for the foundations of the tower began in September 2016. The tower was topped off in March 2020 and construction works slowed down due to the implementation of community quarantines in the country caused by the COVID-19 pandemic. The tower was eventually completed and opened on the 4th quarter of 2021.

== Architecture ==
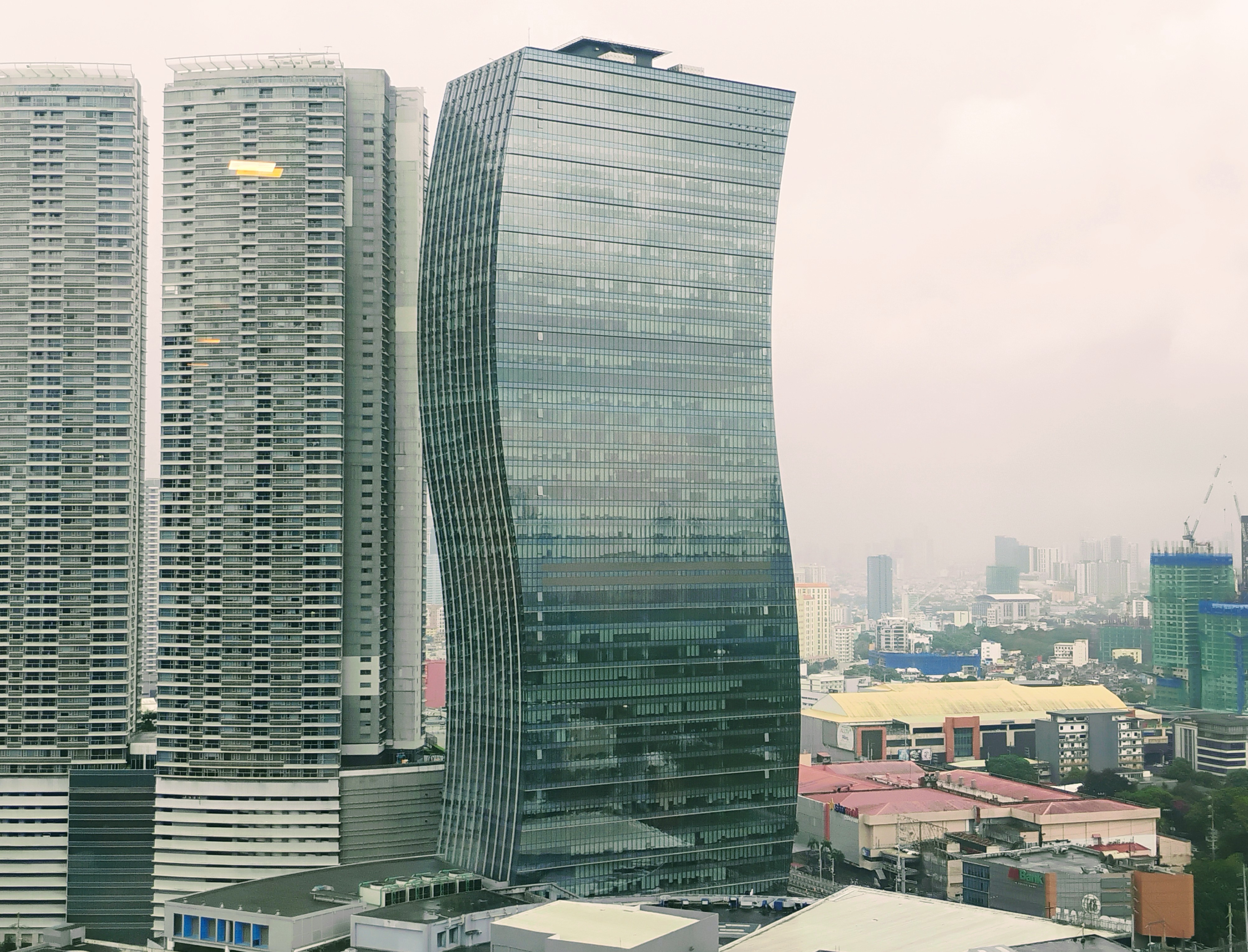
Mega Tower as seen from the The Podium

The Mega Tower features a S-shaped curvilinear structural design that is capable of withstanding earthquakes and seismic activity, while each floor features a rectilinear layout, allowing its tenants to have both flexibility and space augmentation. The tower is also a LEED Gold-certified building, as it is fitted double-glazed, double-height window curtain throughout its facade, reducing the entry of heat into the tower. Other installations in the tower include a rainwater collection system, a greywater recycling system, LED strip lights on the tower's exteriors, and the installation of a Variable Frequency Drive (VFD) installed on the tower's air handling units, making the tower the 4th building of SM Prime Holdings to have such certification. The tower also has an above-ground grand lobby, which is patterned with landscaped pocket gardens, statuario quartz floors, travertine stone walls, an LED screen which displays a variety of flowers on its screen, and a restaurant strip with al-fresco spaces. The grand lobby is directly connected to the SM Megamall's Mega Fashion Hall in the ground level.

Rising at 249.7 m (819.23 ft) high, the tower currently serves as SM Prime Holdings' tallest completed building, which serves as the tower's owner and developer under its subsidiary First Asia Realty Development Corporation. The tower also has 112,000 m^{2} (1,205,557.97 sq ft) of total floor area, and has an approximate typical floor plate of 2,700 m^{2} (29,062.56 sq ft) of office space per floor. The tower also has a total of 1,243 carpark slots, which includes 56 parking slots energy conserving vehicles, divided into three basement and four aboveground parking levels. The tower also has 24 high-speed elevators from Mitsubishi Electric, and also houses a Public Terminal Interchange at the ground floor for UV Express vehicles and shuttle services. A helipad is also built at the top of the tower, which is located at the roofdeck level.

== Tenants ==
The tower hosts a variety of tech companies, business process outsourcing (BPO) companies, and services companies occupy the tower's office levels. On December 14, 2022, Australian BPO company ConnectOS opened its headquarters in the tower, and served as the tower's major foundation tenant. ConnectOS' headquarters features a collaborative workspace design to support more than 2,000 employees.

Greatwork, a co-working space company, occupies office spaces on the 24th, 32nd, and 34th floors of the tower. BIPO Service Philippines Inc., a global human resources and payroll outsourcing company, also hosts its headquarters in the tower. Other additional tenants include [24]7.ai SM Megamall, a BPO company, OCS Philippines-Manila, a cleaning services company that currently occupies the 10th floor of the tower, and Ryan Tax Services Philippines Inc., which has offices at the 36th floor. On May 28, 2024, Vertiv Philippines Inc. opened its new headquarters and offices in the tower, and occupies four floors, namely floors 18 to 22, which spans over 8,000 m^{2} (86,111.28 sq ft) of office space. Vertiv is also set to employ 1,200 employees in their office.

== Incidents ==
- On September 2, 2021, a fire occurred on the 27th floor of the Mega Tower, and reportedly began around 10:26 AM, causing some construction workers in the building to be reportedly trapped. Due to the intensity of the fire, a Philippine Air Force Sikorsky S-76A helicopter was deployed to airlift construction workers on the site. A total of 96 people were later rescued, with two people reported as injured.
