= 2023–24 PBA Commissioner's Cup finals =

Philippine Basketball Association tournament

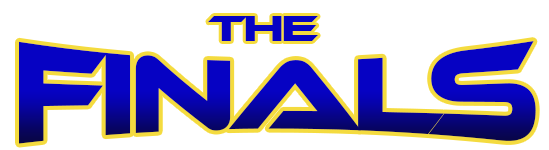
Team	Coach	Wins
(2) San Miguel Beermen	Jorge Gallent	4
(1) Magnolia Chicken Timplados Hotshots	Chito Victolero	2
- Dates: February 2–14, 2024
- MVP: CJ Perez (San Miguel Beermen)
- Television: Local: RPTV; PBA Rush (HD); International: Pilipinas Live; Online: Pilipinas Live
- Announcers: see Broadcast notes
- Radio network: DZSR
- Announcers: see Broadcast notes

Referees
- Game 1: Peter Balao, Bing Oliva, Mike Flordeliza, Jeffrey Tantay
- Game 2: Nol Quilinguen, Rommel Gruta, Joel Baldago, Julius Medillo
- Game 3: Nol Quilinguen, Sherwin Pineda, Albert Nubla, Jeffrey Tantay
- Game 4: Peter Balao, Bing Oliva, Mardy Montoya, Mike Flordeliza
- Game 5: Nol Quilinguen, Rommel Gruta, Joel Baldago, Irewin Traballo
- Game 6: Nol Quilinguen, Sherwin Pineda, Mike Flordeliza, Joel Baldago

PBA Commissioner's Cup finals chronology
- < 2022–23 2024–25 >

PBA finals chronology
- < 2023 Governors' 2024 Philippine >

The 2023–24 Philippine Basketball Association (PBA) Commissioner's Cup finals was the best-of-seven championship series of the 2023–24 PBA Commissioner's Cup. It marked the end of the conference's playoffs.

The San Miguel Beermen and the Magnolia Chicken Timplados Hotshots competed for the 21st Commissioner's Cup championship and the 134th overall championship contested by the league. This was the first time that San Miguel and Magnolia competed for the Commissioner's Cup championship and the tenth time they faced each other in the finals. The last time these two teams met in the finals was during the 2019 PBA Philippine Cup, where the Beermen defeated the Hotshots in 7 games, 4–3.

Starting from the finals, all the PBA games were aired live on RPTV. Previously, the games were still broadcast on A2Z on a delayed basis, while the now-defunct channel CNN Philippines simulcast the games on weekends. Starting from Game 6, A2Z canceled and removed the PBA games from the schedule.

San Miguel defeated Magnolia in six games to claim their fifth Commissioner's Cup title in franchise history. CJ Perez was named the finals MVP for the series.

== Background ==
=== Road to the finals ===
San Miguel Beermen		Magnolia Chicken Timplados Hotshots
Finished 8–3 (.727) in 2nd place	Elimination round	Finished 9–2 (.818) in 1st place
Def. Rain or Shine in one game (twice-to-beat advantage)	Quarterfinals	Def. TNT in one game (twice-to-beat advantage)
Def. Barangay Ginebra, 3–0	Semifinals	Def. Phoenix Super LPG, 3–1

=== Head-to-head matchup ===
A2Z

December 10
6:15 pm

Box score

San Miguel Beermen 90, Magnolia Chicken Timplados Hotshots 94
Scoring by quarter: 19–17, 20–27, 28–24, 23–26
Pts: Aska 29; Rebs: Aska, Lassiter 6 Asts: Perez, Ross 6	Pts: Bey 31; Rebs: Bey 21; Asts: Jalalon 11

PhilSports Arena, Pasig
Referees: Nol Quilinguen, Bing Oliva, Mardy Montoya, Niño Cortez

== Series summary ==
Game	Date	Venue	Winner	Result
Game 1	February 2	SM Mall of Asia Arena	San Miguel	103–95
Game 2	February 4	SM Mall of Asia Arena	San Miguel	109–85
Game 3	February 7	Smart Araneta Coliseum	Magnolia	88–80
Game 4	February 9	Smart Araneta Coliseum	Magnolia	96–85
Game 5	February 11	Smart Araneta Coliseum	San Miguel	108–98
Game 6	February 14	Smart Araneta Coliseum	San Miguel	104–102

== Game summaries ==
=== Game 1 ===
RPTV

February 2
7:30 pm

Box score

San Miguel Beermen 103, Magnolia Chicken Timplados Hotshots 95
Scoring by quarter: 20–24, 41–20, 24–28, 18–23
Pts: Boatwright 28; Rebs: Boatwright 16; Asts: Ross 7	Pts: Bey 26; Rebs: Bey 15; Asts: Jalalon 12
San Miguel leads series, 1–0

SM Mall of Asia Arena, Pasay
Referees: Peter Balao, Bing Oliva, Mike Flordeliza, Jeffrey Tantay

=== Game 2 ===
RPTV

February 4
6:15 pm

Box score

San Miguel Beermen 109, Magnolia Chicken Timplados Hotshots 85
Scoring by quarter: 31–25, 23–16, 25–17, 30–27
Pts: Boatwright 34; Rebs: Fajardo 14; Asts: Boatwright, Ross 5	Pts: Bey 22; Rebs: Bey 16; Asts: Lee 5
San Miguel leads series, 2–0

SM Mall of Asia Arena, Pasay
Referees: Nol Quilinguen, Rommel Gruta, Joel Baldago, Julius Medillo

After the game, Magnolia's Calvin Abueva was fined ₱100,000 for doing mocking gestures towards San Miguel's head coach Jorge Gallent during the game.

=== Game 3 ===
RPTV

February 7
7:30 pm

Box score

San Miguel Beermen 80, Magnolia Chicken Timplados Hotshots 88
Scoring by quarter: 15–24, 24–18, 19–21, 22–25
Pts: Boatwright 27; Rebs: Boatwright, Fajardo 13; Asts: Ross, Teng 3	Pts: Barroca 20; Rebs: Abueva, Jalalon 7 Asts: Barroca 6
San Miguel leads series, 2–1

Smart Araneta Coliseum, Quezon City
Referees: Nol Quilinguen, Sherwin Pineda, Albert Nubla, Jeffrey Tantay

San Miguel's Jericho Cruz was suspended for the game after accumulating five technical fouls during the conference, with his fifth one getting called during game 2.

=== Game 4 ===
RPTV

February 9
7:30 pm

Box score

San Miguel Beermen 85, Magnolia Chicken Timplados Hotshots 96
Scoring by quarter: 19–27, 26–22, 28–23, 12–24
Pts: Fajardo 18; Rebs: Boatwright 14; Asts: Cruz 7	Pts: Bey 26; Rebs: Bey 12; Asts: Barroca 6
Series tied, 2–2

Smart Araneta Coliseum, Quezon City
Referees: Peter Balao, Bing Oliva, Mardy Montoya, Mike Flordeliza

Prior to the game, San Miguel's CJ Perez was awarded his first Best Player of the Conference award, while Phoenix Super LPG's Johnathan Williams was awarded the Best Import of the Conference award.

=== Game 5 ===
RPTV

February 11
6:15 pm

Box score

San Miguel Beermen 108, Magnolia Chicken Timplados Hotshots 98
Scoring by quarter: 25–18, 23–23, 28–27, 32–30
Pts: Cruz 30; Rebs: Fajardo 15; Asts: Perez 5	Pts: Bey 34; Rebs: Bey, Sangalang 8 Asts: Barroca 7
San Miguel leads series, 3–2

Smart Araneta Coliseum, Quezon City
Referees: Nol Quilinguen, Rommel Gruta, Joel Baldago, Irewin Traballo

=== Game 6 ===
RPTV

February 14
7:30 pm

Box score

San Miguel Beermen 104, Magnolia Chicken Timplados Hotshots 102
Scoring by quarter: 22–26, 24–25, 27–31, 31–20
Pts: Perez 28; Rebs: Boatwright 13; Asts: Boatwright 8	Pts: Lee 25; Rebs: Abueva, Bey 8 Asts: Jalalon 9
San Miguel wins series, 4–2

Smart Araneta Coliseum, Quezon City
Referees: Nol Quilinguen, Sherwin Pineda, Mike Flordeliza, Joel Baldago

== Rosters ==
San Miguel Beermen roster
Players
Coaches

Pos.	#	POB	Name	Height	Weight	DOB (YYYY–MM–DD)	From
G	0	(United States)	Simon Enciso	5 ft 11 in (1.80 m)	185 lb (84 kg)	1991–02–12	Notre Dame de Namur
G/F	2	(Philippines)	Don Trollano	6 ft 3 in (1.91 m)	182 lb (83 kg)	1992–01–07	Adamson
F/C	3	(United States)	Moala Tautuaa	6 ft 8 in (2.03 m)	245 lb (111 kg)	1989–04–30	Chadron State
F	4	(Philippines)	Troy Mallillin (R)	6 ft 4 in (1.93 m)	190 lb (86 kg)		Ateneo
G	6	(United States)	Chris Ross (C)	6 ft 1 in (1.85 m)	180 lb (82 kg)	1985–03–09	Marshall
G	7	(Philippines)	Terrence Romeo	5 ft 11 in (1.80 m)	178 lb (81 kg)	1992–03–16	Far Eastern
G/F	13	(United States)	Marcio Lassiter	6 ft 2 in (1.88 m)	185 lb (84 kg)	1987–05–16	Cal State Fullerton
C	15	(Philippines)	June Mar Fajardo	6 ft 10 in (2.08 m)	268 lb (122 kg)	1989–11–17	Cebu
G/F	21	(Philippines)	Jeron Teng	6 ft 2 in (1.88 m)	185 lb (84 kg)	1994–03–21	De La Salle
F	25	(United States)	Bennie Boatwright (I)	6 ft 10 in (2.08 m)	235 lb (107 kg)	1996–07–13	USC
F/C	37	(Philippines)	Nonoy Baclao	6 ft 5 in (1.96 m)	210 lb (95 kg)	1987–06–15	Ateneo
G	39	(Philippines)	Jericho Cruz	6 ft 1 in (1.85 m)	190 lb (86 kg)	1990–10–11	Adamson
G	76	(Saudi Arabia)	Kyt Jimenez (R)	5 ft 11 in (1.80 m)	165 lb (75 kg)		UPHSD
G/F	77	(Hong Kong)	CJ Perez	6 ft 2 in (1.88 m)	185 lb (84 kg)	1993–11–17	Lyceum
F	87	(Philippines)	Vic Manuel	6 ft 4 in (1.93 m)	201 lb (91 kg)	1987–06–18	PSBA
F/C	91	(Philippines)	Rodney Brondial	6 ft 5 in (1.96 m)	210 lb (95 kg)	1990–11–20	Adamson

Head coach

- (Philippines) Jorge Gallent

Assistant coach(es)

- (Philippines) Peter Martin (1st assistant)
- (Philippines) Ato Agustin
- (Philippines) Dayong Mendoza
- (Philippines) Biboy Ravanes
- (United States) Chris Ross
- (Philippines) Boyzie Zamar
- (Philippines) Leo Austria (consultant)

Team manager

- (Philippines) Gee Abanilla
- (Philippines) Daniel Henares (assistant)

Legend

- (C) Team captain
- (CI) Commissioner's Cup Import
- (GI) Governors' Cup Import
- (EI) EASL Import
- (DP) Unsigned draft pick
- (FA) Free agent
- (IN) Inactive
- (S) Suspended
- (R) Rookie
- Injured

Roster

Magnolia Chicken Timplados Hotshots roster
Players
Coaches

Pos.	#	POB	Name	Height	Weight	DOB (YYYY–MM–DD)	From
G/F	0	(United States)	Tyler Bey (I)	6 ft 7 in (2.01 m)	215 lb (98 kg)	1998–02–10	Colorado
F	1	(Philippines)	Jackson Corpuz	6 ft 4 in (1.93 m)	195 lb (88 kg)	1989–02–08	Philippine Christian
G	2	(United States)	Jerrick Ahanmisi	6 ft 1 in (1.85 m)	185 lb (84 kg)	1997–10–16	Adamson
G	3	(Philippines)	Paul Lee	6 ft 0 in (1.83 m)	200 lb (91 kg)	1989–02–14	UE
C	4	(United States)	Rafi Reavis (C)	6 ft 8 in (2.03 m)	210 lb (95 kg)	1977–07–26	Coppin State
F/C	5	(Philippines)	Abu Tratter	6 ft 5 in (1.96 m)	215 lb (98 kg)	1993–01–09	De La Salle
G	6	(Philippines)	Jio Jalalon	5 ft 9 in (1.75 m)	150 lb (68 kg)	1992–08–02	Arellano
F/C	10	(Philippines)	Ian Sangalang	6 ft 7 in (2.01 m)	212 lb (96 kg)	1991–12–20	San Sebastian
F	11	(United States)	David Murrell (IN)	6 ft 4 in (1.93 m)	195 lb (88 kg)	1996–11–08	UP Diliman
F	13	(Philippines)	Calvin Abueva	6 ft 3 in (1.91 m)	209 lb (95 kg)	1988–02–04	San Sebastian
G	14	(Philippines)	Mark Barroca	5 ft 10 in (1.78 m)	170 lb (77 kg)	1986–04–25	Far Eastern
F	19	(United States)	Rome dela Rosa	6 ft 3 in (1.91 m)	185 lb (84 kg)	1990–12–11	San Beda
F	23	(British Hong Kong)	Joseph Eriobu	6 ft 4 in (1.93 m)	198 lb (90 kg)	1992–02–12	Mapúa
C	42	(Australia)	James Laput	6 ft 10 in (2.08 m)	245 lb (111 kg)	1996–08–26	De La Salle
F	57	(Philippines)	Aris Dionisio	6 ft 4 in (1.93 m)		1995–07–21	St. Clare
G	65	(Philippines)	Jed Mendoza	5 ft 10 in (1.78 m)	160 lb (73 kg)	1996–06–21	UE
F/C	88	(Philippines)	Russel Escoto	6 ft 6 in (1.98 m)	200 lb (91 kg)	1992–12–04	Far Eastern

Head coach

- (Philippines) Chito Victolero

Assistant coach(es)

- (Philippines) Jason Webb (1st assistant)
- (Philippines) Johnny Abarrientos
- (Philippines) Angelito Esguerra
- (Philippines) Antonio Espinosa
- (Philippines) Mon Jose
- (Philippines) Juno Sauler
- (Philippines) Paul Sorongon

Team manager

- (Philippines) Alvin Patrimonio

Legend

- (C) Team captain
- (CI) Commissioner's Cup Import
- (GI) Governors' Cup Import
- (EI) EASL Import
- (DP) Unsigned draft pick
- (FA) Free agent
- (IN) Inactive
- (S) Suspended
- (R) Rookie
- Injured

Roster

== Broadcast notes ==
The Commissioner's Cup Finals was aired live on RPTV, with simulcast on PBA Rush and Pilipinas Live in standard and high definition. A2Z also aired the games on a delayed timeslot until it was canceled and removed from the schedule after Finals Game 5.

PBA Rush provided the English language coverage of the Finals, while Pilipinas Live provided the English-Filipino language coverage of the Finals.

Game	RPTV and A2Z			PBA Rush			Pilipinas Live	
Game	Play-by-play	Analyst(s)	Courtside Reporters	Play-by-play	Analyst	Courtside Reporters	Streaming Hosts	Hosts
Game 1	Charlie Cuna	Dominic Uy, Luigi Trillo and Ryan Gregorio	Belle Gregorio	Paolo del Rosario	Charles Tiu	Denise Tan	Carlo Pamintuan, Bea Escudero and Atoy Co	Anton Roxas, Ryan Gregorio and Ronnie Magsanoc
Game 2	Magoo Marjon	Andy Jao, Yeng Guiao and Ryan Gregorio	Apple David	Carlo Pamintuan	Norman Black	Bea Escudero	Belle Gregorio and Brandon Bates	Anton Roxas, Ryan Gregorio and Chris Gavina
Game 3	Sev Sarmenta	Andy Jao, Dominic Uy and Ryan Gregorio	Eileen Shi	Anthony Suntay	Mark Molina	Julia Vargas	Denise Tan	Anton Roxas, Ryan Gregorio and Jong Uichico
Game 4	Jutt Sulit	Quinito Henson, Ronnie Magsanoc and Ryan Gregorio	Belle Gregorio	Carlo Pamintuan	Mark Molina and Justin Brownlee	Bea Escudero	Paolo del Rosario and Denise Tan	Anton Roxas, Ryan Gregorio and Nico Salva
Game 5	Charlie Cuna	Andy Jao, Yeng Guiao and Ryan Gregorio	Apple David	Paolo del Rosario	Eric Altamirano	Denise Tan	Carlo Pamintuan and Bea Escudero	Anton Roxas, Ryan Gregorio and Rodney Santos
Game 6	Magoo Marjon	Quinito Henson, Dominic Uy and Ryan Gregorio	Belle Gregorio	Carlo Pamintuan	Norman Black	Bea Escudero	Jutt Sulit, Denise Tan and Diego Dario	Anton Roxas, Ryan Gregorio and Nico Salva

- Additional Game 6 Crew:
  - Trophy Presentation: Jutt Sulit and Bea Escudero
  - Celebration Interviewer: Belle Gregorio
