= Bennie Boatwright =

American basketball player (born 1996)

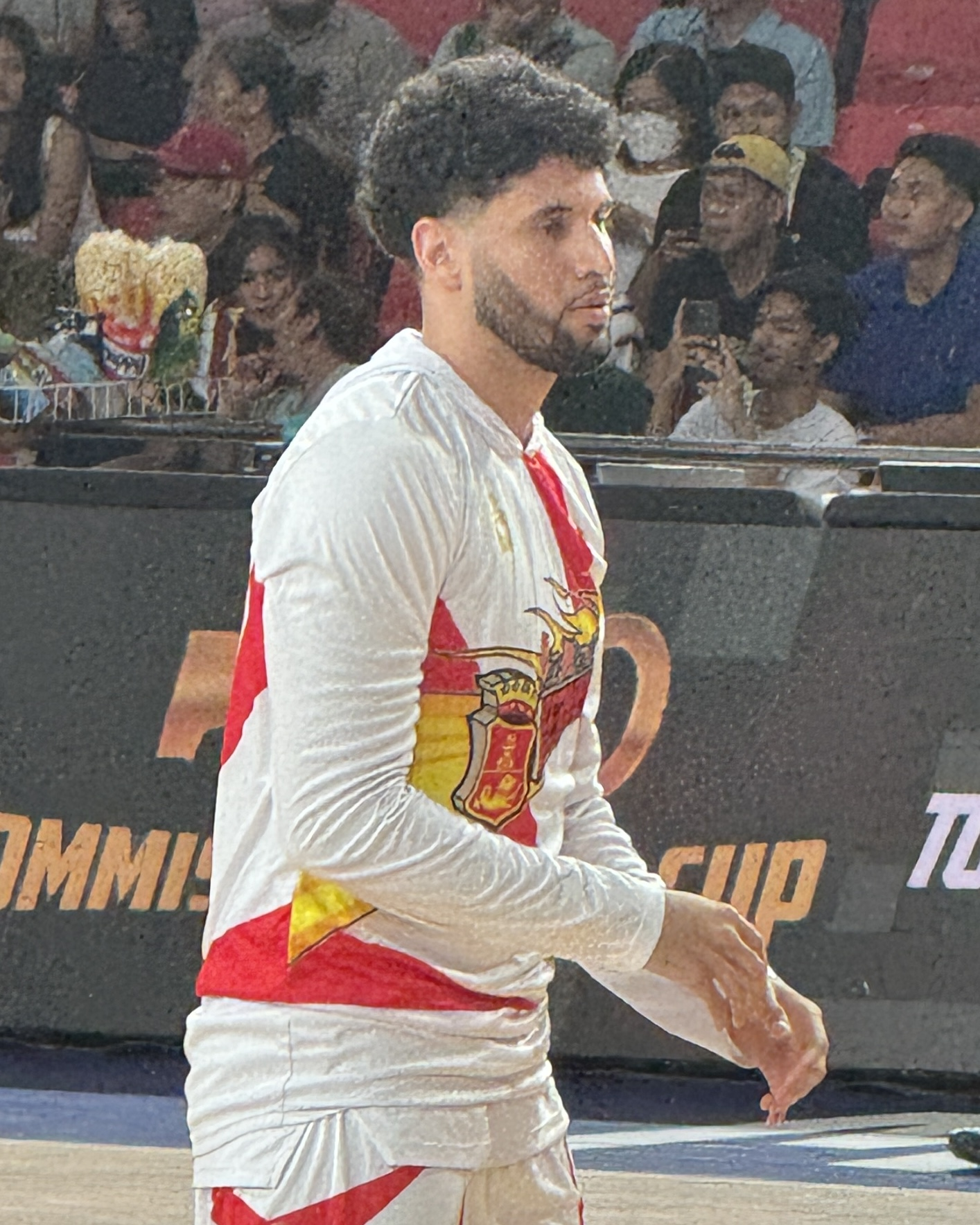
- Boatwright with the San Miguel Beermen in 2026

No. 25 – Fujian Sturgeons
- Position: Power forward
- League: CBA

Personal information
- Born: July 13, 1996 (age 30) Los Angeles, California, U.S.
- Listed height: 6 ft 10 in (2.08 m)
- Listed weight: 235 lb (107 kg)

Career information
- High school: Village Christian (Sun Valley, California)
- College: USC (2015–2019)
- NBA draft: 2019: undrafted
- Playing career: 2019–present

Career history
- 2019–2021: Memphis Hustle
- 2021: Maccabi Ironi Ramat Gan
- 2021–2023: Fort Wayne Mad Ants
- 2023: Libertadores de Querétaro
- 2023–2024: San Miguel Beermen
- 2024: Shanxi Loongs
- 2025: Taipei Fubon Braves
- 2026: Daegu KOGAS Pegasus
- 2026: San Miguel Beermen
- 2026–present: Fujian Sturgeons

Career highlights
- PBA champion (2023–24 Commissioner's); First-team All-Pac-12 (2019)
- Stats at NBA.com
- Stats at Basketball Reference

Bennie Francois Boatwright III (born July 13, 1996) is an American-born naturalized Filipino professional basketball player for the Fujian Sturgeons of the Chinese Basketball Association (CBA). He played college basketball for the USC Trojans.

== Early life ==
Boatwright is the son of police officer Bennie Boatwright Sr., who was an All-CIF shooting guard at Lutheran High. Boatwright attended Village Christian School, where he was coached by Jon Shaw. As a senior, he averaged 27 points and 12 rebounds per game. Boatwright led the team to a Southern Section 1AA championship, scoring 30 points and grabbing 13 rebounds in the title game. He signed with USC.

== College career ==
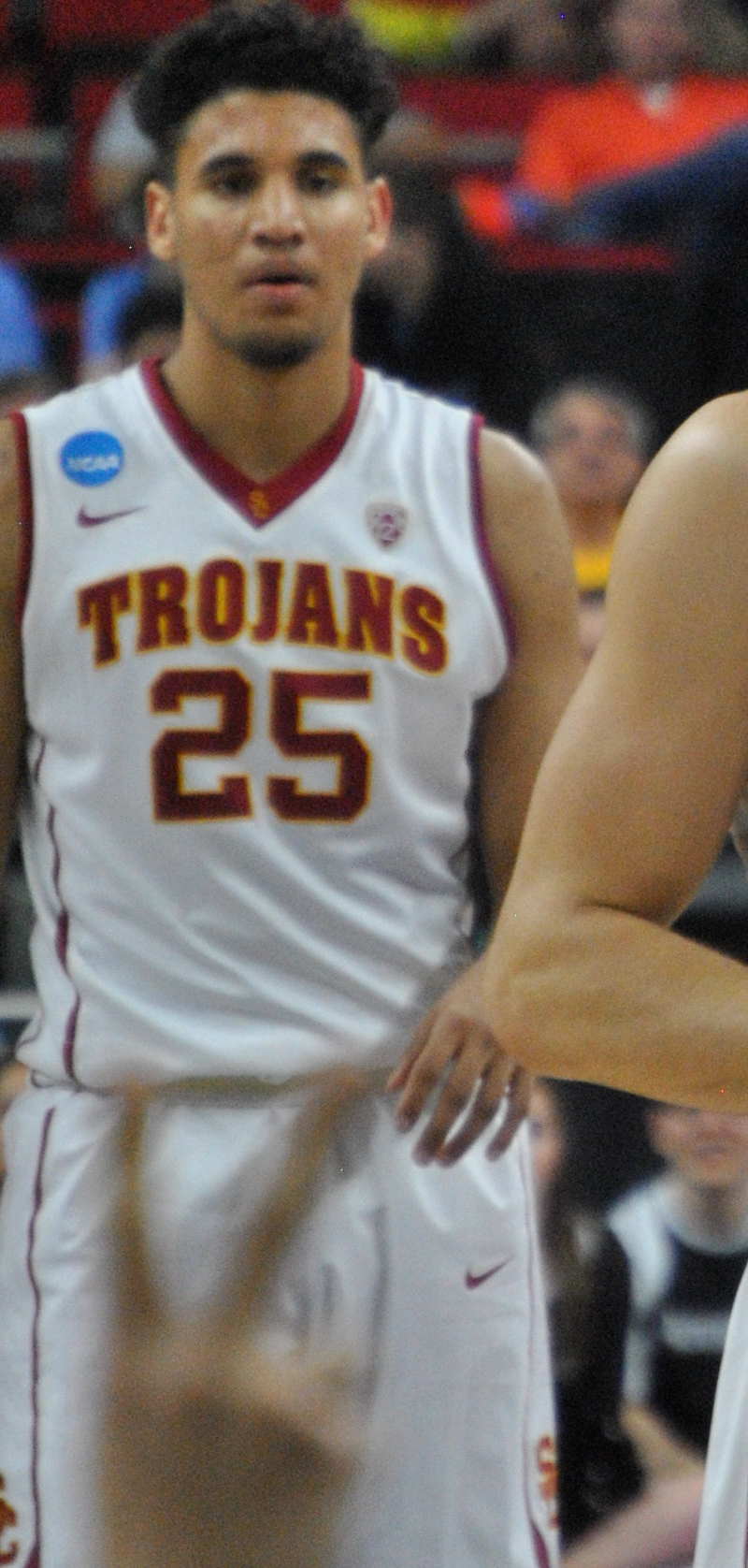
Boatwright with the USC Trojans in 2016

Boatwright averaged 11.5 points and 5.2 rebounds per game and made 60 3-pointers as a freshman. As a sophomore, he averaged a team-high 15.1 points and helped the Trojans to two wins in the NCAA tournament. He declared for the NBA draft but ultimately returned to school. His junior season was shortened as he missed the final nine games. He averaged 13.6 points and 6.4 rebounds per game as a junior. In the offseason after his junior year, Boatwright underwent knee surgery. As a senior, Boatwright averaged 18.2 points, 6.6 rebounds and 2.5 assists per game. He was named to the First Team All-Pac-12.

== Professional career ==
=== Memphis Hustle (2019–2021) ===
After going undrafted in the 2019 NBA draft, Boatwright joined the Detroit Pistons' Summer League roster.

On October 18, 2019, Boatwright signed with the Memphis Grizzlies, but was waived on October 19. He was named to the roster of the Grizzlies’ NBA G League affiliate, the Memphis Hustle. Boatwright missed his rookie season due to a knee injury. On December 15, 2020, Boatwright signed with the Memphis Grizzlies. He was subsequently waived on December 19, and rejoined the Hustle.

=== Fort Wayne Mad Ants (2021–2023) ===
On September 10, 2021, the Fort Wayne Mad Ants acquired the returning player rights of Boatwright from the Memphis Hustle. However, he was waived on February 19, 2022, after suffering a season-ending injury.

On September 16, 2022, Boatwright signed with the Indiana Pacers. He was then later waived. On September 26, he re-signed with the Mad Ants, but was waived on February 8, 2023.

=== San Miguel Beermen (2023–2024) ===
In December 2023, Boatwright signed with the San Miguel Beermen of the Philippine Basketball Association (PBA) to replace Ivan Aska as the team's import for the 2023–24 PBA Commissioner's Cup. In his second game, he scored 51 points in a 132–110 win against the Terrafirma Dyip.

Boatwright and the Beermen won the championship by defeating the Magnolia Chicken Timplados Hotshots in six games, earning his first as a professional.

=== Shanxi Loongs (2024) ===
On February 28, 2024, Boatwright signed with the Shanxi Loongs of the Chinese Basketball Association. He was afflicted by an injury in August 2024 for which he had treatment for it.

=== Taipei Fubon Braves (2025) ===
In August 2025, Boatwright signed a test contract with the Taipei Fubon Braves of the Taiwanese P. League+. On October 8, he made his debut for the team in the East Asia Super League. On October 24, he signed a formal contract with the team. On December 31, his contract was terminated.

=== Daegu KOGAS Pegasus (2026) ===
On January 5, 2026, Boatwright signed with the Daegu KOGAS Pegasus of the Korean Basketball League, replacing Nick Perkins.

=== San Miguel Beermen (2026) ===
Boatwright returned to San Miguel Beermen in the PBA as a mid-tournament replacement for import Justin Patton in the 2026 Commissioner's Cup. Boatwright was being considered to be brought in earlier in the tournament but was unavailable due to his commitments with Daegu at the time. He played his first game of the conference with SMB in April 2026.

=== Fujian Sturgeons (2026–present) ===
On September 3, 2026, he signed with the Fujian Sturgeons of the Chinese Basketball Association.

== Personal life ==
Boatwright is a dual citizen, and was granted Filipino citizenship via naturalization through a bill which lapsed into law on August 31, 2026. He became a candidate for naturalization as early as April 2024. The process was stalled due to his August 2024 injury. He took his oath of allegiance and obtained a Philippine passport in October 2026. His Filipino citizenship makes him eligible to play for the Philippine national team.

== Career statistics ==
Legend
GP	Games played	GS	Games started	MPG	Minutes per game
FG%	Field goal percentage	3P%	3-point field goal percentage	FT%	Free throw percentage
RPG	Rebounds per game	APG	Assists per game	SPG	Steals per game
BPG	Blocks per game	PPG	Points per game	**Bold**	Career high

=== College ===
Year	Team	GP	GS	MPG	FG%	3P%	FT%	RPG	APG	SPG	BPG	PPG
2015–16	USC	**33**	**32**	24.4	.394	.359	.738	5.2	1.0	.4	**.8**	11.5
2016–17	USC	19	18	27.6	.428	.364	**.907**	4.5	1.7	.4	.4	15.1
2017–18	USC	23	18	27.7	.415	.346	.726	6.4	2.0	.3	**.8**	13.6
2018–19	USC	31	28	**33.5**	**.474**	**.429**	.702	**6.6**	**2.5**	**.7**	.6	**18.2**
Career		106	96	28.3	.432	.380	.759	5.7	1.8	.5	.7	14.5
