= Julia Vargas Avenue =

Road in Metro Manila, Philippines

Coordinates: 14°35′3″N 121°4′3″E

- Doña Julia Vargas Avenue
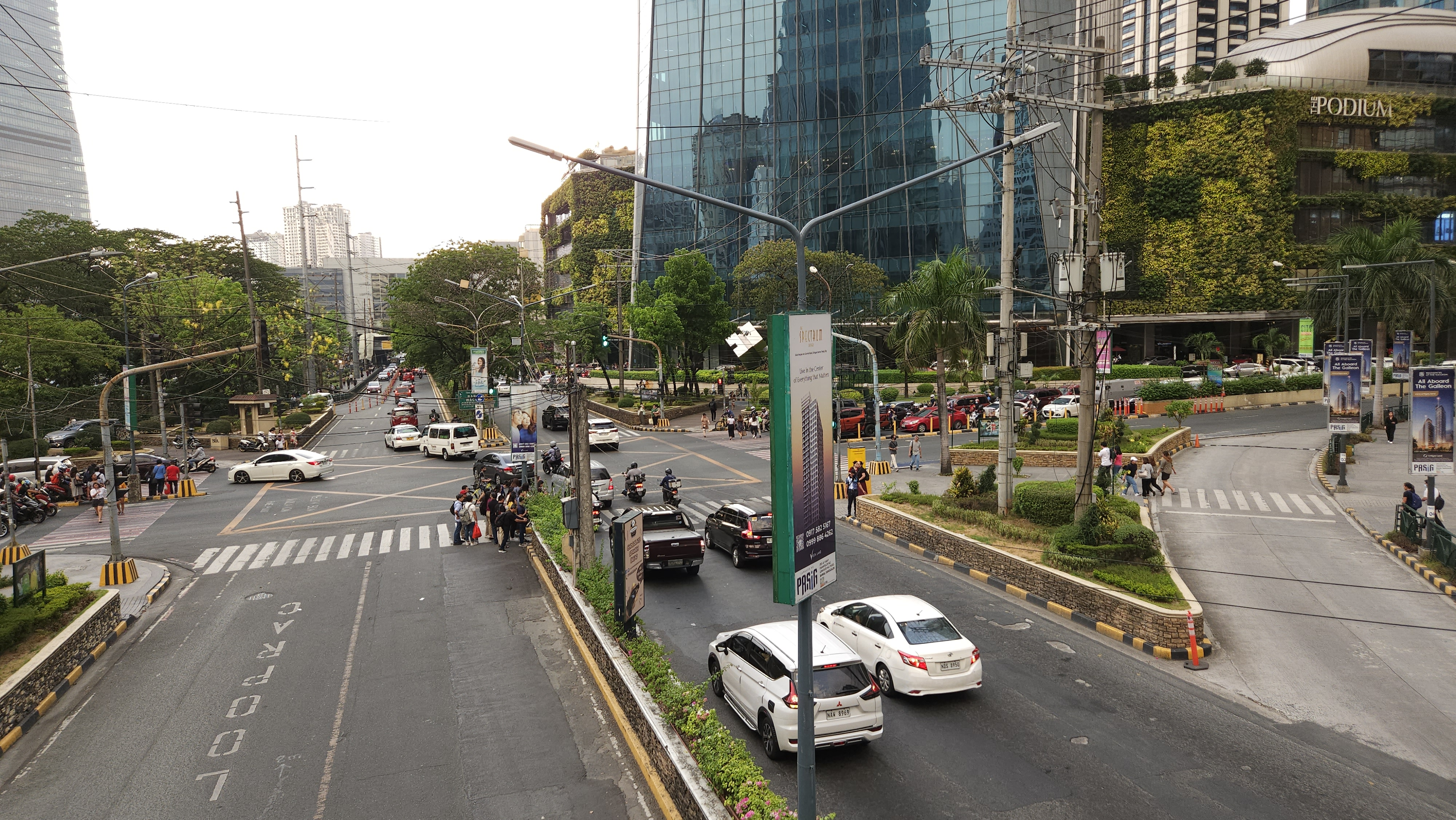
- Intersection of Julia Vargas Avenue, ADB Avenue, and San Miguel Avenue
- Interactive map of Julia Vargas Avenue
- Namesake: Doña Julia Vargas de Ortigas
- Length: 2.3 km (1.4 mi)
- West end: AH 26 (N1) (Epifanio de los Santos Avenue) in Mandaluyong
- Major junctions: ADB Avenue / San Miguel Avenue; Meralco Avenue
- East end: N11 (Eulogio Rodriguez Jr. Avenue) in Pasig

Julia Vargas Avenue is a central east–west arterial road that passes through Ortigas Center in Metro Manila, Philippines. It is a four-lane divided road with one-way protected bike lanes that run parallel to Ortigas Avenue to the north and Shaw Boulevard to the south. The avenue stretches 2.3 kilometers (1.4 mi) from Eulogio Rodriguez Jr. Avenue (C-5 Road) in Ugong, Pasig in the east to Epifanio de los Santos Avenue (EDSA) in Wack-Wack Greenhills, Mandaluyong in the west.

It was named for philanthropist Doña Julia Vargas de Ortigas, wife of Ortigas & Company Limited Partnership founder Don Francisco Ortigas y Barcinas, who owned the Hacienda de Mandaloyon estate on which Ortigas Center was built.

== Route description ==
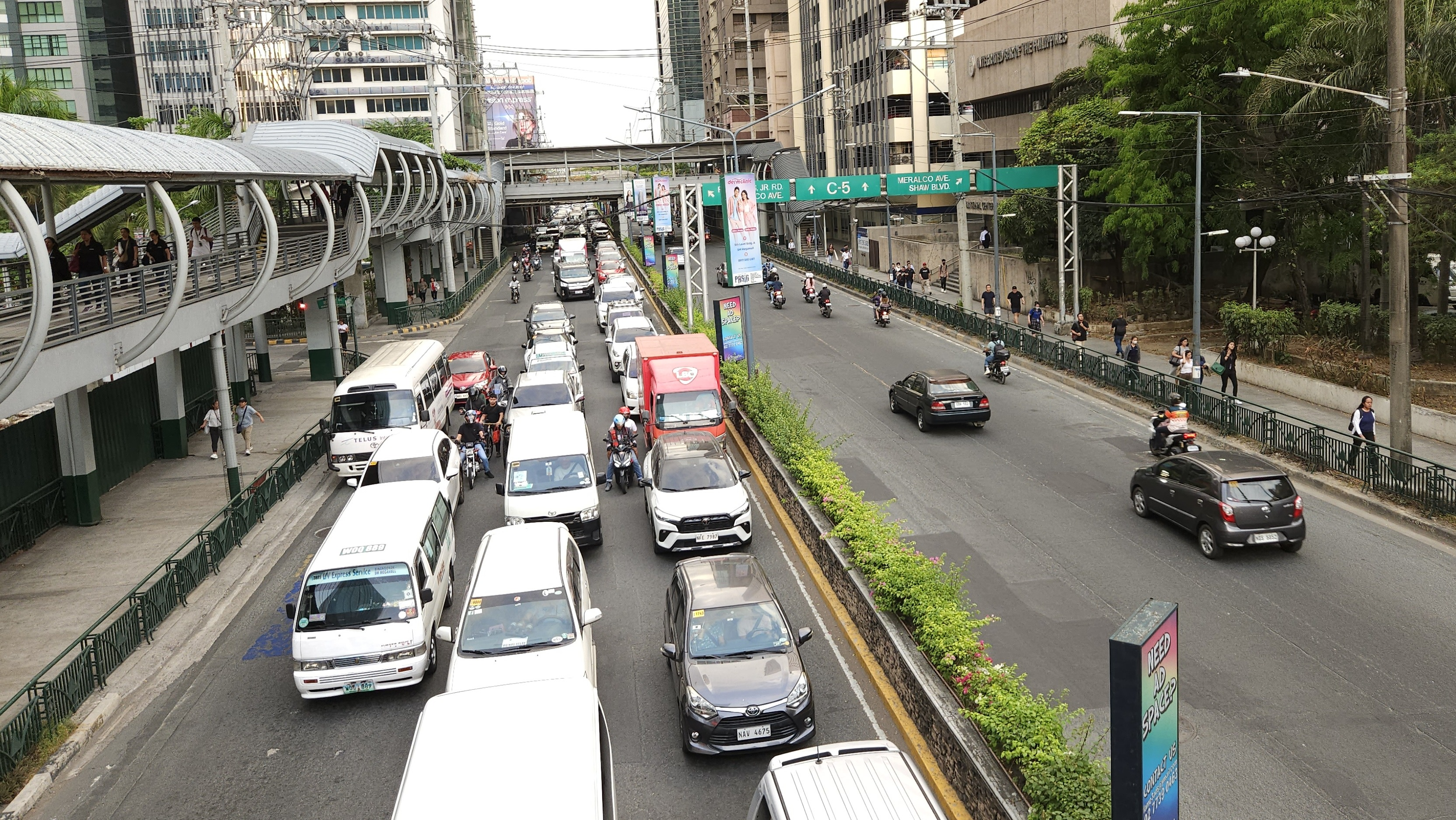
Afternoon traffic along Julia Vargas Avenue

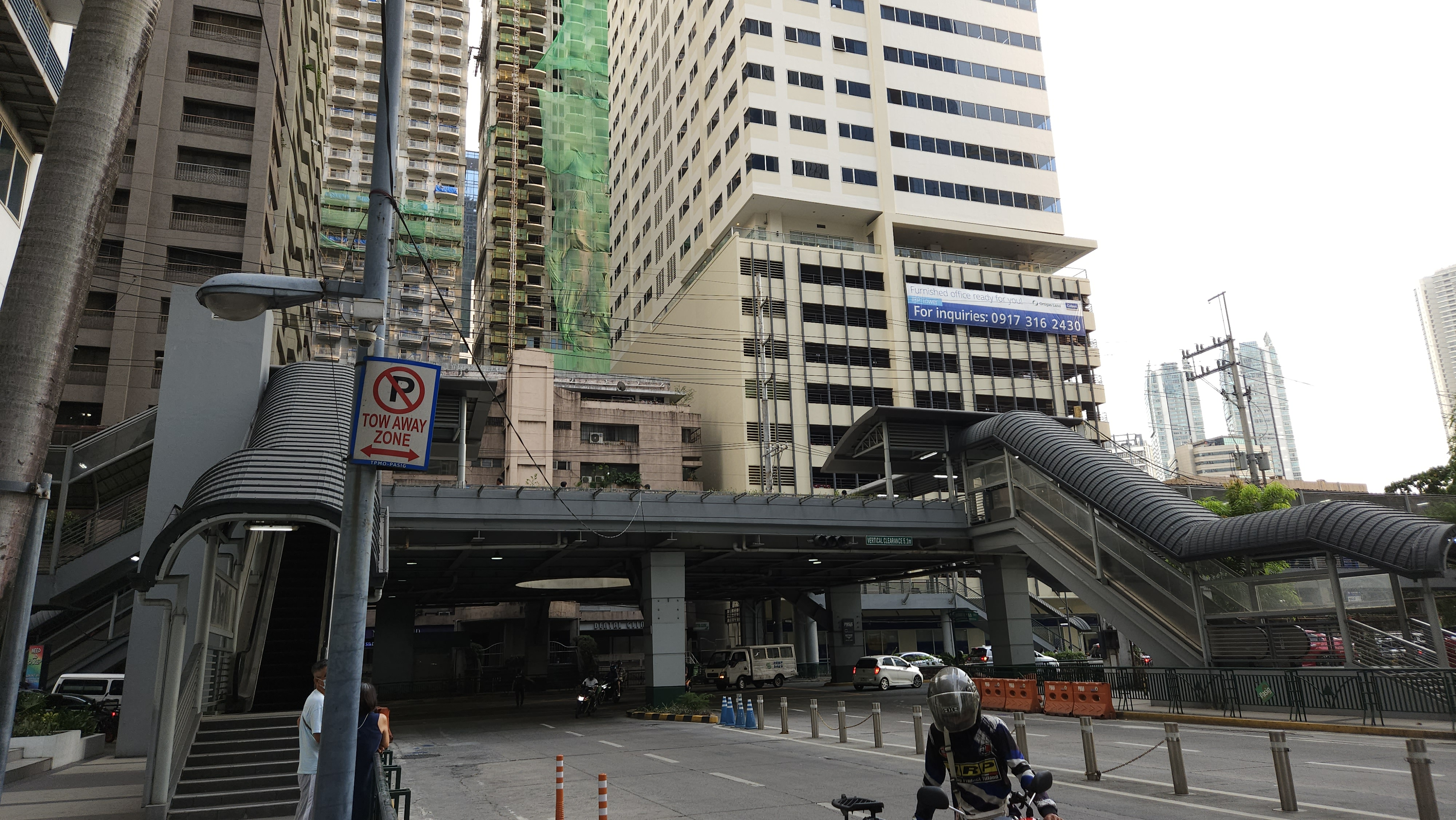
The Julia Vargas Elevated Plaza above the intersection of Julia Vargas and F. Ortigas Road

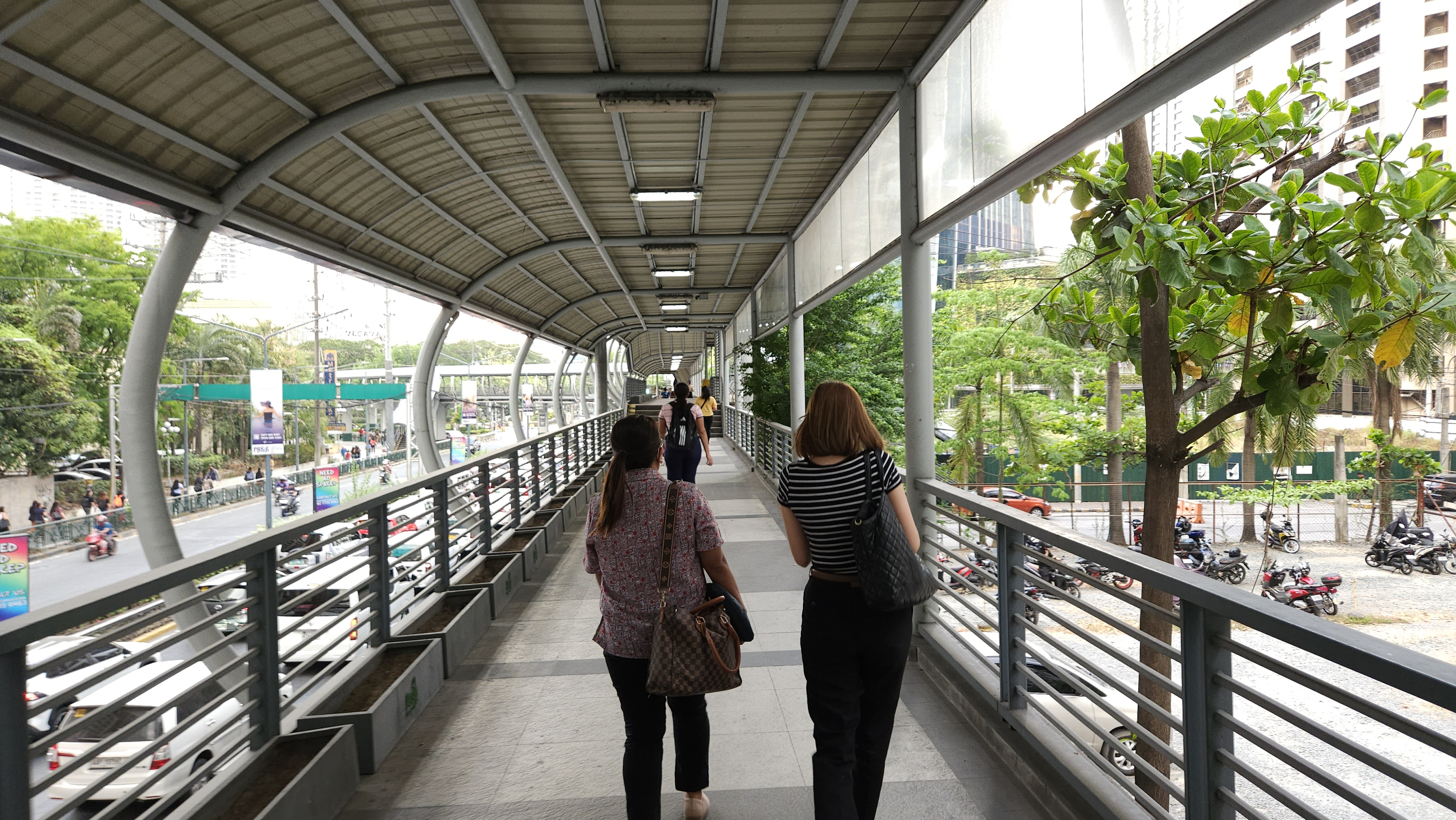
People walking along the Ortigas Walkways above Julia Vargas Avenue

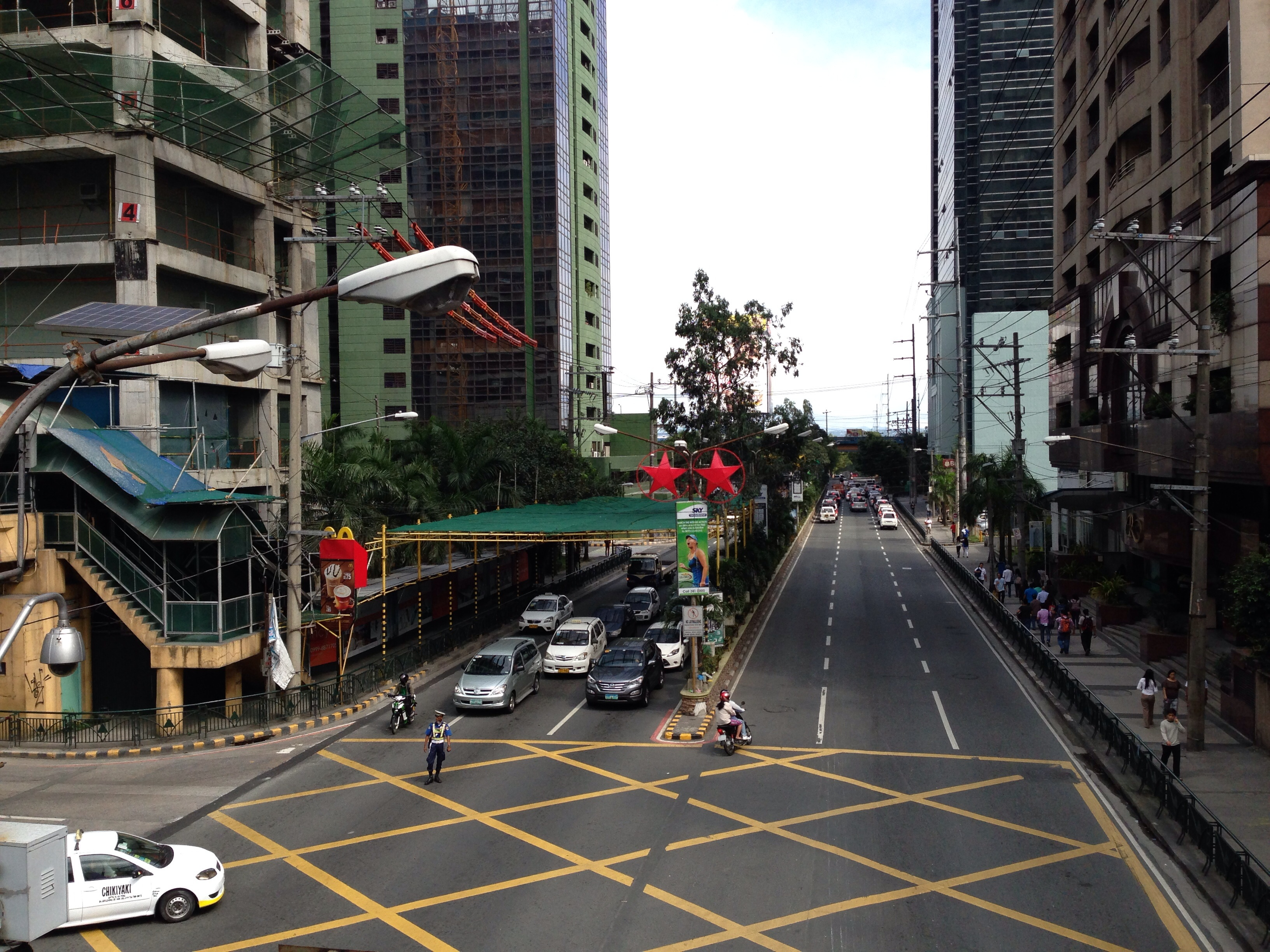
The intersection of Julia Vargas Avenue and F. Ortigas Jr. Road (Emerald Avenue) in 2013, before the construction of the elevated plaza

Julia Vargas Avenue originates at an intersection with C-5 Road, also known as E. Rodriguez, Jr. Avenue, where SM Center Pasig is located. It heads west across Valle Verde. Between the next intersection at Lanuza Avenue and City Golf, Vargas is the boundary between Valle Verde 3 and 4 villages. It passes the Ortigas Home Depot, a Sitel call center building, and a row of bars on the northern side before it comes to an intersection with Meralco Avenue and the Meralco flyover.

West of Meralco Avenue, the avenue officially enters the Ortigas Center business district. It passes the office towers in San Antonio, Pasig, toward the border with Barangay Wack-Wack Greenhills, Mandaluyong, at the intersection with ADB Avenue and San Miguel Avenue, where the El Pueblo Real de Manila strip mall is located. This span of Julia Vargas Avenue onwards used to contain one-way unprotected bike lanes, which have since faded.

The Ortigas Walkways Project, a series of elevated pedestrian walkways, covers the span of Julia Vargas Avenue within San Antonio.

From ADB and San Miguel to Bank and St. Francis, Vargas is one-way westbound only. The left side of the road only allows left turns to St. Francis Street, while the right side continues as a service road and allows right turns to Bank Drive. At the western edge of Ortigas Center are St. Francis Square Mall, San Miguel Corporation Headquarters, and SM Megamall. The avenue ends at EDSA as a two-way carriageway.

== Development ==
=== Carpool lanes ===
The road was previously a six-lane divided avenue with no bike lanes until 2018 when an experimental road diet was implemented. This diet changed the corridor into a widened four-lane (two lanes per direction) divided avenue with one-way bike lanes with bollards. In each direction, one lane acted as a carpool lane for at least four passengers per vehicle, while the other was designated as a non-carpool lane.

This traffic scheme has since been rescinded due to motorist confusion. Despite this, the lane markings remain, and vehicle traffic during rush hours largely ignores them, informally reverting the avenue to its six-lane (three lanes per direction) state.

=== Motorcycle and bike lanes ===
In March 2021, Pasig Mayor Vico Sotto announced that the avenue would undergo another road diet, shrinking the two car lanes and adding a motorcycle lane parallel to the bike lane. The bike lane will also be physically separated by plant boxes.

== Intersections ==
Province	City/Municipality	km	mi	Destinations	Notes
Pasig				N11 (E. Rodriguez Jr. Avenue)	Traffic light intersection.
Pasig				Frontera Drive / Kaimito Street	Frontera Drive is part of Ortigas East (formerly Frontera Verde). Kaimito Street provides access for Valle Verde 2.
Pasig				Valle Verde 5 Celery gate (Note: Name is conjectural.)	Westbound access only. Access for Valle Verde 5.
Pasig				Valle Verde 2 Sampaguita gate (Note: Name is conjectural.)	Access for Valle Verde 2.
Pasig				Lanuza Avenue	
Pasig				Coconut Street	Access for Valle Verde 4.
Pasig				Molave Street	Access for Valle Verde 3.
Pasig				Meralco Avenue	Traffic light intersection. Meralco Avenue goes over the road via flyover.
Pasig				Sapphire Road	Eastern terminus of the Ortigas Walkways Project.
Pasig				Grant Road	
Pasig				Emerald Avenue	Traffic light intersection. Elevated plaza segment of Ortigas Walkways Project.
Pasig				Ruby Road	
Pasig–Mandaluyong boundary				ADB Avenue / San Miguel Avenue	Traffic light intersection. Road becomes one-way towards EDSA. Western terminus of the Ortigas Walkways Project.
Mandaluyong				Bank Drive / St. Francis Street	Road becomes two-way again and acts as a service road for SM Megamall.
Mandaluyong				AH 26 (N1) (EDSA)	Western terminus.
1.000 mi = 1.609 km; 1.000 km = 0.621 mi: Closed/former; Concurrency terminus; Incomplete access; Route transition

== Landmarks ==
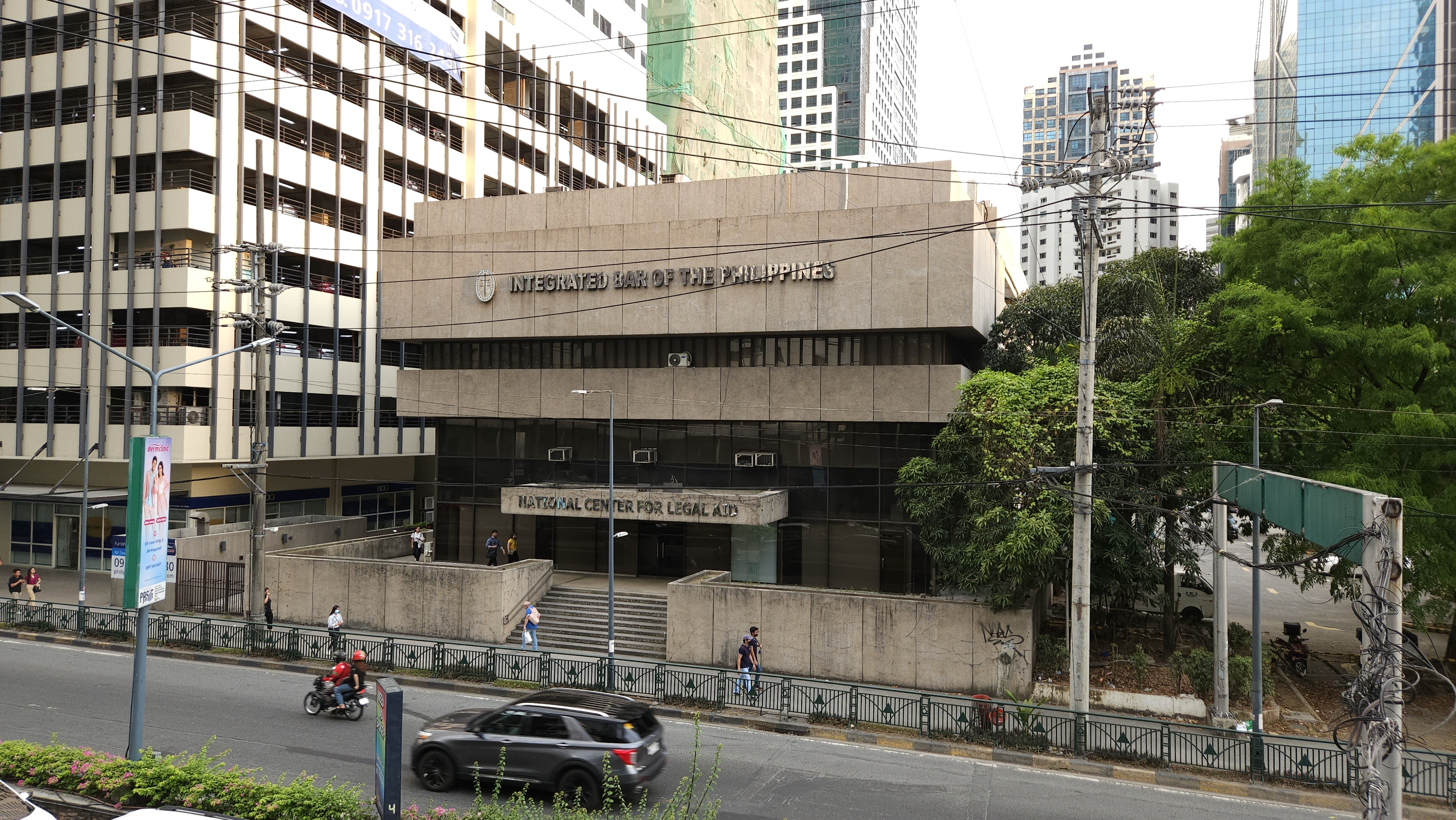
IBP Building

- Antel Global Corporate Center
- Integrated Bar of the Philippines
- Metrobank Ortigas Center
- The Centerpoint Ortigas
- The Currency Ortigas
- City Golf
- El Pueblo Real de Manila
- One Corporate Center
- CW Home Depot
- New Metropolitan Manila Development Authority Head Office
- San Miguel Corporation Headquarters
- St. Francis Square Mall
- Sitel
- SM Center Pasig
- SM Megamall
- The Podium
