= The Podium West Tower =

Office skyscraper in Mandaluyong, Philippines

- The skyscraper in 2019
- Interactive map of the The Podium West Tower area

General information
- Status: Completed
- Type: Office
- Coordinates: 14°35′06″N 121°03′34″E
- Construction started: 2015
- Topped-out: September 27, 2018
- Completed: May 2019

Height
- Roof: 210 m (689.0 ft)

Technical details
- Floor count: 48

Design and construction
- Architect: Arquitectonica
- Developer: Keppel Philippines Properties; BDO Unibank
- Structural engineer: ECCRUZ Corporation
- Main contractor: DDT Konstract, Inc.

Website
- tpwt.com.ph

The Podium West Tower is a 48-storey office skyscraper in Mandaluyong, Metro Manila, Philippines. It is part of The Podium mixed-used development, a project which was started in 2002. At its base, occupying the first five levels of the building, is The Podium shopping mall.

The Podium shopping mall opened in 2002 but construction of The Podium West Tower would begin years later in 2015. The building topped-out on September 27, 2018 and overall construction of the tower was finished in May 2019.

Prior to its completion, the US Green Building Council has given the building LEED Gold Mark certification. The Building and Construction Authority of Singapore also gave the building provisional Green Mark Gold Award.
