= BDO Corporate Center Ortigas =

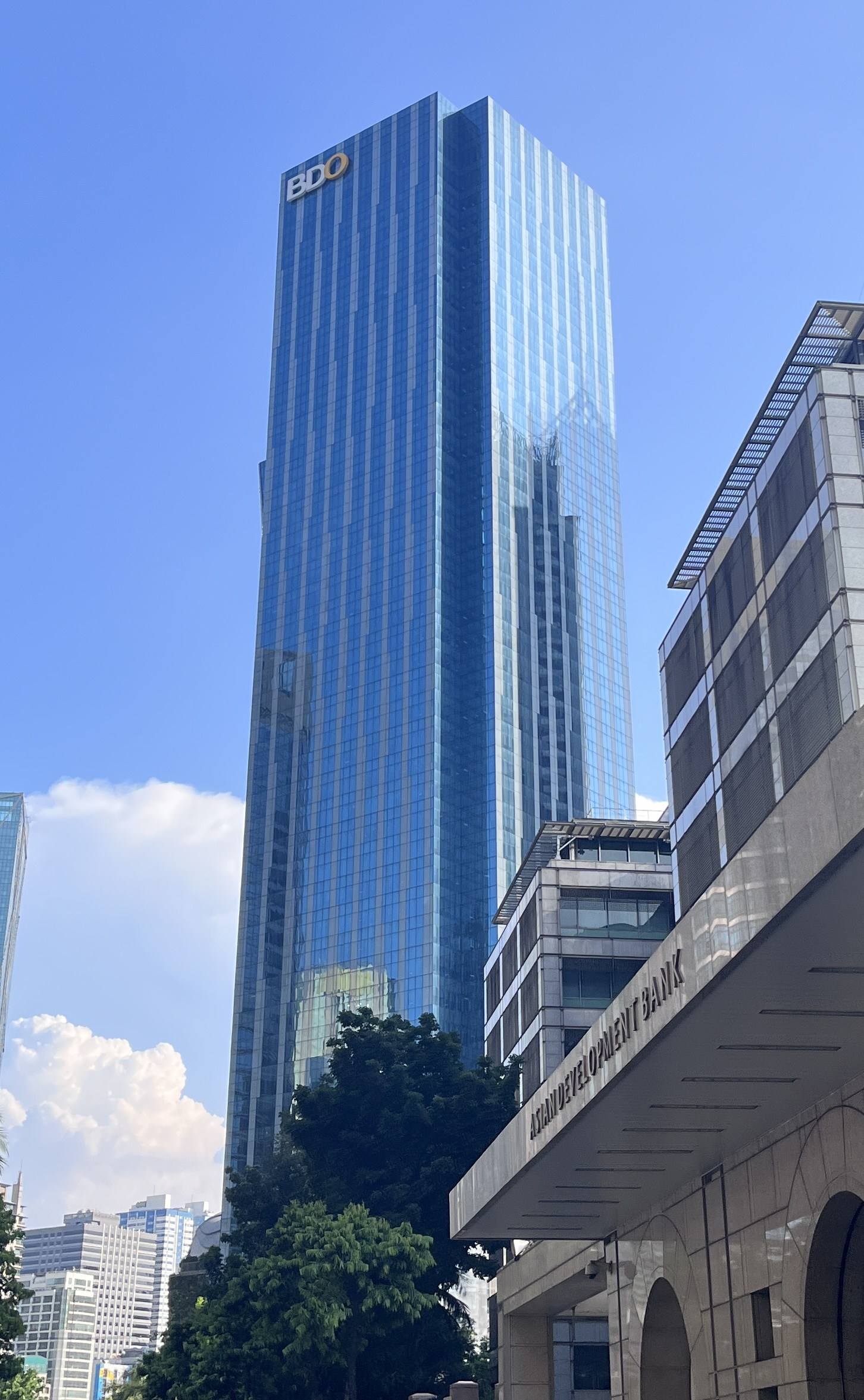
- Interactive map of the BDO Corporate Center Ortigas area

General information
- Status: Completed
- Type: Office
- Location: 12 ADB Avenue, Ortigas Center, Mandaluyong, Philippines
- Coordinates: 14.5863509°N 121.0589897°E
- Construction started: 2012
- Completed: 2015
- Cost: ₱2 billion

Height
- Roof: 210 m (688.98 ft)

Technical details
- Floor count: 47

Design and construction
- Architecture firm: Arquitectonica; FSL & Associates, Co.
- Developer: SM Keppel Land
- Main contractor: DDT Konstract, Inc.

The BDO Corporate Center Ortigas is an office skyscraper in the Ortigas Center, Mandaluyong, Philippines, serving as the headquarters of Banco de Oro (BDO) Finance, a subsidiary of BDO Unibank. Located along ADB Avenue, it is one of the tallest buildings in Ortigas Center standing at almost 689 feet (210 meters).

== Architecture and design ==
The BDO Corporate Center designed by the architectural firms Arquitectonica and FSL & Associates, Co. The firm designed the BDO Corporate Center attained it Gold LEED certification for the building. Double glazed curtain walls, with ceramic frit are among the prominent features of the building. The 47-storey building was built on top of an already existing shopping mall building of The Podium.

== Construction ==
Close-up view of BDO Corporate Center in 2019

The construction of the BDO Corporate Center commenced in the first half of 2012. Initially the building was planned to be completed by the first quarter of 2015 but the building was completed in November 2015.

About ₱2 billion was the estimated cost for the construction of the building.

== Tenants ==
The building is occupied by the banking firm Banco de Oro (BDO), the namesake of the building. The BDO Corporate Center was not meant to become the new headquarters of Banco de Oro. The bank's management & many major offices still remained in Makati (former Equitable-PCI Headquarters) until their demolition starting 2022.

== Reception ==
The main occupants of the BDO Corporate Center, Banco de Oro received three awards for the building at the Philippine Property Awards 2015, namely the Best Commercial Development, Best Office Development and Best Office Architectural Design awards.
