= Julia Vargas =

Filpina social worker and philanthropist (1881–1969)

- Born: Julia Vargas y Camus; April 21, 1881; Sta. Cruz, Manila, Captaincy General of the Philippines, Spanish Empire
- Died: April 15, 1969 (aged 87)
- Organization: Philippine Tuberculosis Society (PTS)
- Movement: Crusade against Tuberculosis
- Spouse: Francisco Ortigas Sr. (died 1935)
- Parents: Eduardo Vargas (father); Amalia Camus (mother)
- Awards: Golden Heart Presidential Award (1960)

Julia Camus Vargas-Ortigas (April 21, 1881 – April 15, 1969) was a Filipina social worker and philanthropist. As the matriarch of the prominent Ortigas clan, a notable family in the Philippine business sector, she played a vital role in shaping their legacy. She is known for her anti-tuberculosis work in the Philippines and was responsible for the establishment of Quezon Institute, the hospital arm of the Philippine Tuberculosis Society. The institute was one of the first healthcare institutions that provided essential care and support to those affected by the disease in the Philippines.

== Biography ==
Vargas was born to a well-off family on April 27, 1881 in Santa Cruz, Manila. She was the daughter of Eduardo Vargas, a Spanish naval officer and Filipina Amalia Camus. Later, Vargas married Francisco Ortigas Sr., who established the Ortigas & Company Limited Partnership. Julia and her husband were noted for developing the 4,033-hectare property they owned in Manila, which now hosts several business districts in Manila, including the Ortigas Center and Greenhills in San Juan. The couple had seven children, including Eduardo Ortigas y Vargas.

Vargas became noted for her involvement in social work. She was an active member of the Philippine Tuberculosis Society (PTS) for 30 years. She was considered one of the noted crusaders against tuberculosis, which was the leading cause of death in the Philippines during her time. She is also credited as the founder of the Quezon Institute, the hospital arm of PTS. She was able to do this through her work that contributed in the passage of the Sweepstakes Law, which established a national lottery in the Philippines. PTS became one of its first beneficiaries. The breadth of her social work earned for her several citations and awards including the Philippines' Golden Heart Presidential Award, which she received in 1960.

The Julia Vargas Avenue, a 2.3-kilometer arterial road that passes through Metro Manila's Ortigas Center, was named after her.
