= The Podium =

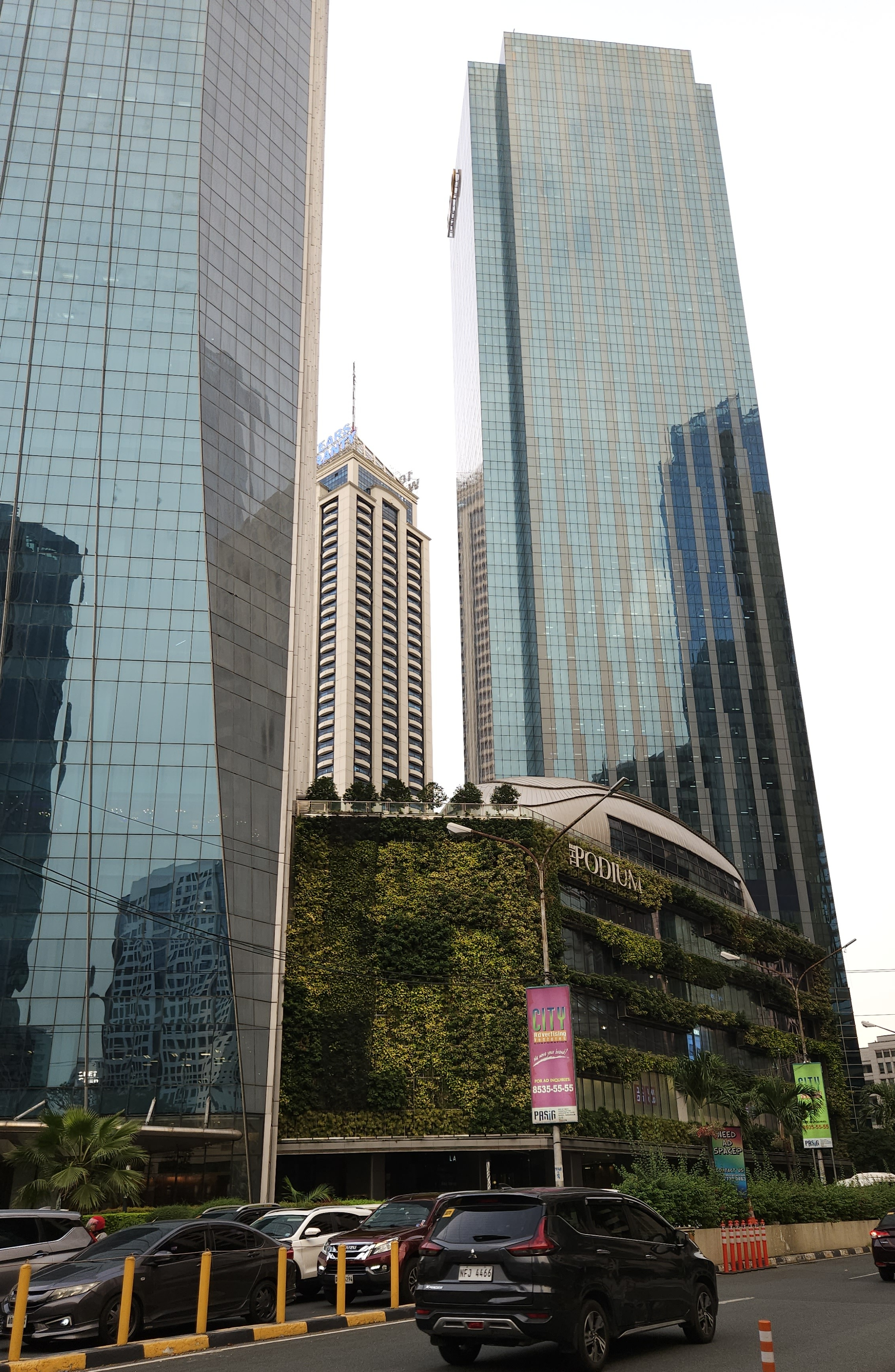
- The Podium along ADB Avenue in 2024

Project
- Developer: Keppel Land Inc. BDO Unibank
- Architect: Pimentel, Rodriguez, Simbulan and Partners (Phase 1); Arquitectonica and Felix S. Lim and Associates (Phase 2)
- Website: thepodium.com.ph

Physical features
- Divisions: The Podium (mall); BDO Corporate Center; The Podium West Tower

Location
- Interactive map of The Podium
- Coordinates: 14.585°N 121.059°E
- Country: Philippines
- City: Mandaluyong

The Podium, also called SM Podium or SM The Podium, is a mixed-use development located along ADB Avenue in the Ortigas Center, a major business and commercial district in Mandaluyong, Philippines. It was developed in December 2001 and officially opened in August 2002 as a joint project of Singaporean company, Keppel Land, and BDO Unibank.

The mixed-use development has a floor area of 140,000 m^{2} (1,500,000 sq ft) and consists of a shopping mall of the same name, which has a floor area of 50,000 m^{2} (540,000 sq ft) and two office buildings built on top of it, having a total floor area of 90,000 m^{2} (970,000 sq ft). The buildings are the BDO Corporate Center and The Podium West Tower which were built in 2015 and 2019.

A six-level expansion (Phase 2), located beside the main mall, was opened on October 27, 2017. The expansion will also include a podium within the towers, and was opened on 2019. The main building (Phase 1) entered renovation works following the opening, and was completed in December 2018.

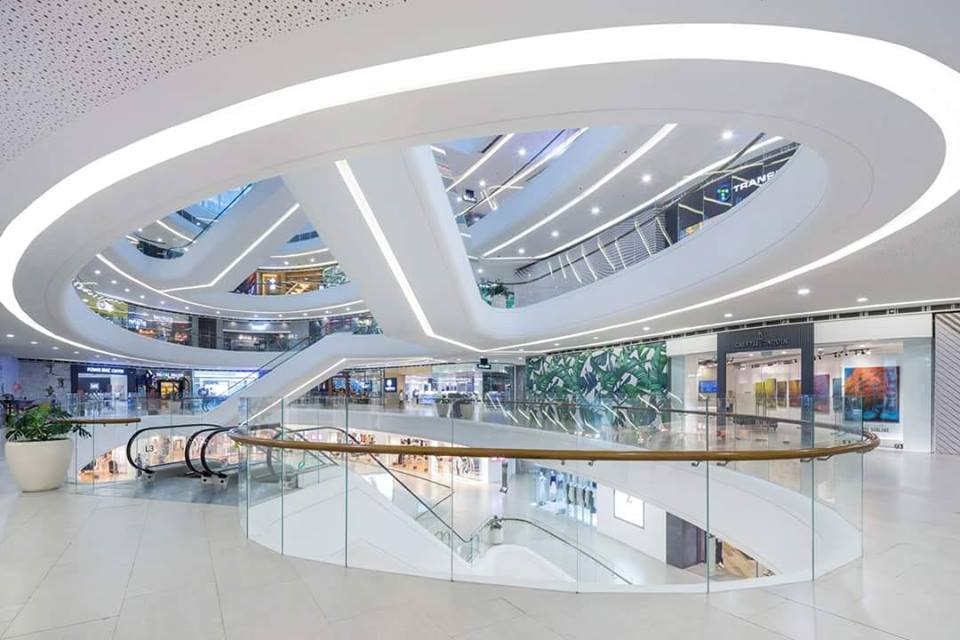
Interior of the renovated Podium Mall

== History ==
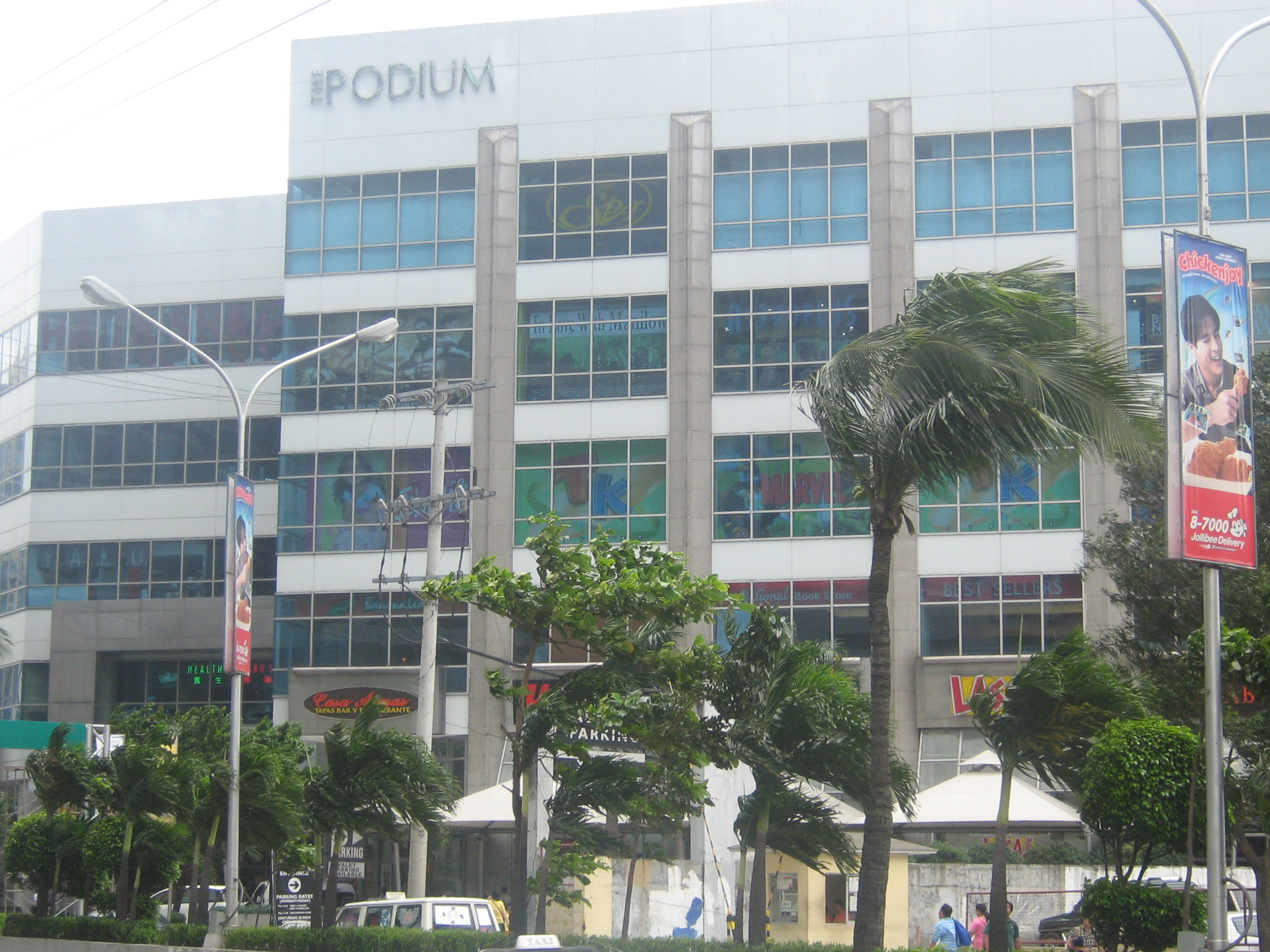
The Podium Mall Phase 1 in 2007, before renovations

Logo until 2023, before the rebranding

Completed in July 2001, the first phase of The Podium mall was designed by Pimentel, Rodriguez, Simbulan and Partners (PRSP) and was constructed by the Monolith Construction and Development Corporation with a conditioned floor area of 26,922 m^{2} (289,790 sq ft). The mall was opened in 2002.

The mall was a few meters away from SM Megamall and the St. Francis Square Mall. It was also located beside the Benguet Center building, which was the headquarters of BDO Unibank until 2011. This gave way to the mall's full closure in 2017 for expansion works.

On October 27, 2017, the mall held a soft opening of its second phase, with the first phase remaining closed for renovation.

In May 2019, part of the underside of an escalator at the mall collapsed after heavy rains damaged part of the mall's ceiling.

On September 6, 2019, Singapore president Halimah Yacob graced the grand reopening of The Podium, completing the mall's second phase. She was in Manila for a state visit to celebrate the 50th anniversary of diplomatic relations between Singapore and the Philippines.

On March 27, 2023, BDO Unibank announced that it would take full ownership of The Podium complex after its board approved the acquisition of shares of its partners in the SM Keppel Land Inc. (SMKL) joint venture. it later formally acquired in December of the same year. The following month in January 2024, SM Keppel Land Inc. merged with its parent BDO Unibank Inc., with BDO Unibank Inc. as surviving entity of the said merger.

== Features ==
Designed with a modern mix of glass, curves and green. The Podium features intricate architectural accents and a living green wall facade. It also features three Director's Club Cinemas that were opened on December 15, 2018.

== Awards ==
The Podium was awarded the LEED Gold Mark (Core & Shell) pre-certification by the US Green Building Council and is also the first building in the Philippines to receive the provisional Green Mark Gold Award by the Building and Construction Authority of Singapore.

== See also ==
- SM Aura
- SM Lanang
