= SM Supermalls =

Chain of malls in the Philippines and China

- Product type: Shopping mall chain
- Current owner: SM Prime
- Country: Philippines
- Introduced: November 8, 1985; 41 years ago
- Related brands: SM Retail
- Markets: Philippines and China
- Tagline: You're always welcome here. We've got it all for you! Gala to the Max!
- Website: smsupermalls.com (English version) smsupermalls.cn (Chinese version)

SM Supermalls, or simply SM, is a chain of shopping malls owned by the Philippine-based SM Prime. As of November 2026, it has a total of 99 malls (90 in the Philippines and 9 in China), with eight more under construction (seven in the Philippines and one in China). It was originally known as Shoemart, from which the name SM is derived.

== History ==
SM North EDSA, the first SM Supermall.

SM Supermalls was pioneered by Henry Sy, a Chinese-Filipino businessman whose roots traces back to Fujian. Sy opened his first shoe store in Quiapo in 1948 and later the first store under the Shoemart (SM) name in 1958 along Carriedo. In 1972, Shoemart turned into a full-line department store.

In 1985, the company ventured into the supermarket and home appliance store business. It opened the first "Supermall" in the same year named SM North EDSA in Quezon City.

SM expanded abroad with the opening of its first branch in China in 2001. The mall is SM City Xiamen in Fujian.

Due to the COVID-19 pandemic, the company's revenue was down nearly 50% in 2020, though it claims to have maintained a healthy occupancy rate throughout the pandemic.

== Locations ==
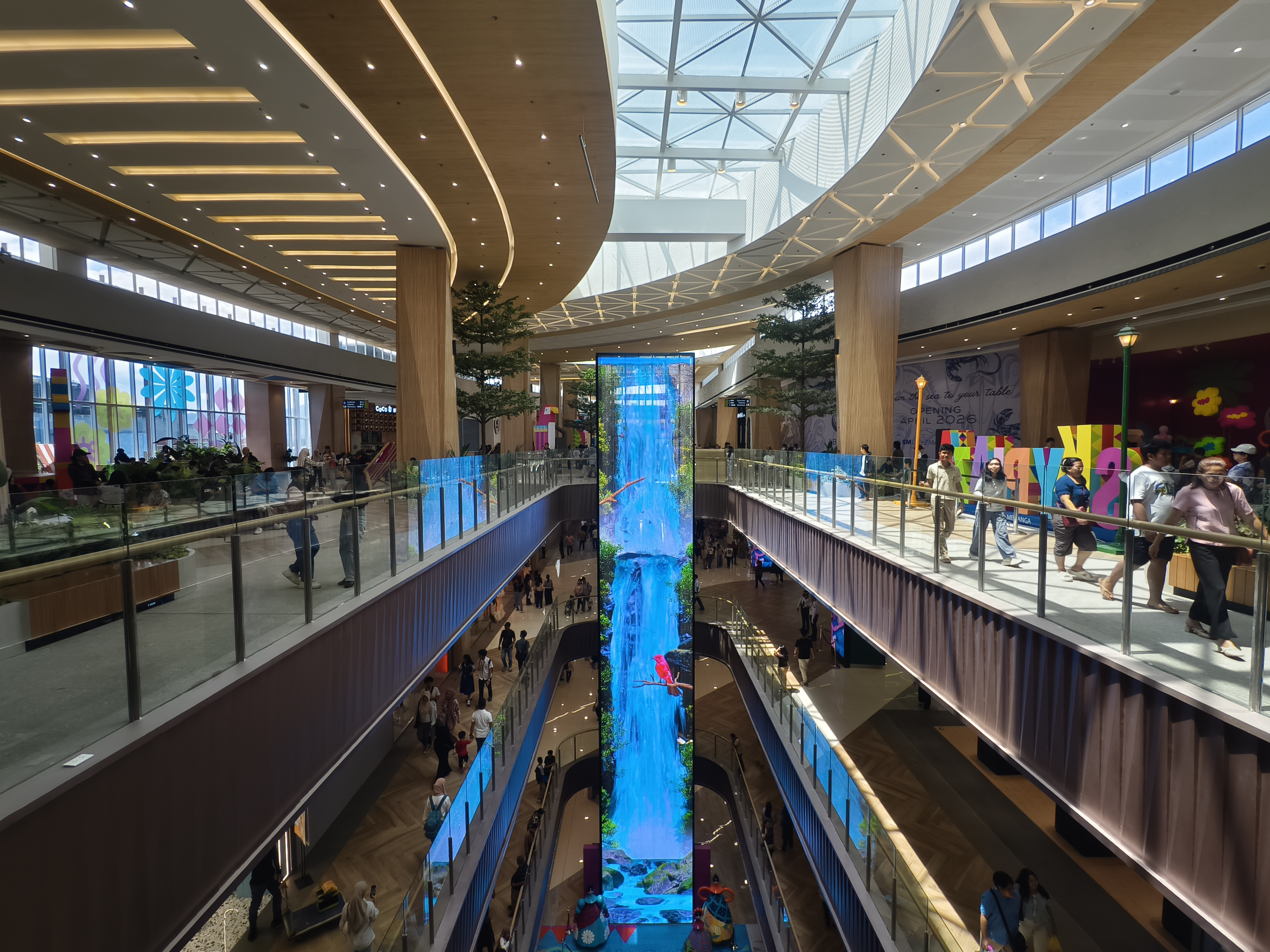
The recently opened SM City Zamboanga's atrium

Currently, there are 90 shopping malls in the Philippines managed by SM Supermalls, including the latest addition, SM City Zamboanga, which opened on March 20, 2026. It also has nine malls in China, including the most recent mall, SM City Haicang, which opened on October 24, 2025. Some of its malls are among the largest in the Philippines and also among the largest in the world.

=== Philippines ===
Current SM Supermalls in the Philippines

List of 91 malls by SM Supermalls, showing the opening date and location
Name	Image	Opening Date	Location	Province/Region	Ref.
SM North EDSA		November 8, 1985	Quezon City	Metro Manila	
SM City Santa Mesa		September 28, 1990	Quezon City	Metro Manila	
SM Megamall		June 28, 1991	Mandaluyong	Metro Manila	
SM City Cebu		November 27, 1993	Cebu City	Cebu	
SM Southmall		April 2, 1995	Las Piñas	Metro Manila	
SM City Bacoor		July 25, 1997	Bacoor	Cavite	
SM City Fairview		October 25, 1997	Quezon City	Metro Manila	
SM City Iloilo		June 11, 1999	Iloilo City	Iloilo	
SM City Manila		April 14, 2000	Manila	Metro Manila	
SM City Pampanga		November 11, 2000	San Fernando and Mexico	Pampanga	
SM City Sucat		May 25, 2001	Parañaque	Metro Manila	
SM City Davao		November 17, 2001	Davao City	Davao del Sur	
SM City CDO Uptown		November 15, 2002	Cagayan de Oro	Misamis Oriental	
SM City Bicutan		November 29, 2002	Parañaque	Metro Manila	
SM City Lucena		October 3, 2003	Lucena	Quezon	
SM City Baguio		November 21, 2003	Baguio	Benguet	
SM City Marilao		November 28, 2003	Marilao	Bulacan	
SM City Dasmariñas		May 21, 2004	Dasmariñas	Cavite	
SM City Batangas		November 12, 2004	Batangas City	Batangas	
SM City San Lazaro		July 15, 2005	Manila	Metro Manila	
SM City Valenzuela		October 28, 2005	Valenzuela	Metro Manila	
SM City Molino		November 18, 2005	Bacoor	Cavite	
SM City Santa Rosa		February 17, 2006	Santa Rosa	Laguna	
SM City Clark		May 12, 2006	Angeles	Pampanga	
SM Mall of Asia		May 21, 2006	Pasay	Metro Manila	
SM Center Pasig		August 19, 2006	Pasig	Metro Manila	
SM City Lipa		September 22, 2006	Lipa	Batangas	
SM City Bacolod		March 1, 2007	Bacolod	Negros Occidental	
SM City Taytay		November 9, 2007	Taytay	Rizal	
SM Center Muntinlupa		November 16, 2007	Muntinlupa	Metro Manila	
SM City Marikina		September 5, 2008	Marikina	Metro Manila	
SM City Rosales		November 28, 2008	Rosales	Pangasinan	
SM City Baliwag		December 12, 2008	Baliuag	Bulacan	
SM City Naga		May 1, 2009	Naga	Camarines Sur	
SM Center Las Piñas		October 2, 2009	Las Piñas	Metro Manila	
SM City Rosario		November 20, 2009	Rosario	Cavite	
SM City Tarlac		April 30, 2010	Tarlac City	Tarlac	
SM City San Pablo		October 1, 2010	San Pablo	Laguna	
SM City Calamba		October 15, 2010	Calamba	Laguna	
SM City Novaliches		October 22, 2010	Quezon City	Metro Manila	
SM City Masinag		May 6, 2011	Antipolo	Rizal	
SM City Olongapo Downtown		December 15, 2011 (soft opening); February 10, 2012 (grand opening)	Olongapo	Zambales	
SM City Consolacion		June 1, 2012	Consolacion	Cebu	
SM City San Fernando Downtown		July 20, 2012	San Fernando	Pampanga	
SM City General Santos		August 10, 2012	General Santos	South Cotabato	
SM Lanang		September 28, 2012	Davao City	Davao del Sur	
SM Aura		May 17, 2013	Taguig	Metro Manila	
SM City BF Parañaque		November 29, 2013	Parañaque	Metro Manila	
SM City Cauayan		May 30, 2014	Cauayan	Isabela	
SM Center Angono		November 14, 2014	Angono	Rizal	
SM Megacenter Cabanatuan		April 24, 2015	Cabanatuan	Nueva Ecija	
SM City San Mateo		May 15, 2015	San Mateo	Rizal	
SM City Cabanatuan		October 9, 2015	Cabanatuan	Nueva Ecija	
SM Center Shaw		October 13, 2015	Mandaluyong	Metro Manila	
SM Center Sangandaan		October 23, 2015	Caloocan	Metro Manila	
SM Seaside City		November 27, 2015	Cebu City	Cebu	
SM City San Jose Del Monte		April 29, 2016	San Jose del Monte	Bulacan	
SM City Trece Martires		May 13, 2016	Trece Martires	Cavite	
S Maison		June 15, 2016 (soft opening); June 15, 2017 (grand opening)	Pasay	Metro Manila	
SM Center Congressional		November 25, 2016	Quezon City	Metro Manila	
SM City East Ortigas		December 2, 2016	Pasig	Metro Manila	
SM CDO Downtown		May 12, 2017	Cagayan de Oro	Misamis Oriental	
SM Center Antipolo Downtown		June 30, 2017	Antipolo	Rizal	
SM City Puerto Princesa		September 15, 2017	Puerto Princesa	Palawan	
SM Center Tuguegarao Downtown		October 12, 2017	Tuguegarao	Cagayan	
SM Center Pulilan		December 1, 2017	Pulilan	Bulacan	
SM Center Lemery		December 15, 2017	Lemery	Batangas	
SM Center Imus		February 16, 2018	Imus	Cavite	
SM City Urdaneta Central		May 4, 2018	Urdaneta	Pangasinan	
SM City Telabastagan		May 18, 2018	San Fernando	Pampanga	
SM City Legazpi		September 14, 2018	Legazpi	Albay	
SM Center Ormoc		November 16, 2018	Ormoc	Leyte	
SM City Olongapo Central		September 13, 2019	Olongapo	Zambales	
SM Center Dagupan		October 4, 2019	Dagupan	Pangasinan	
SM City Butuan		November 13, 2020	Butuan	Agusan del Norte	
SM City Mindpro		December 8, 2020	Zamboanga City	Zamboanga del Sur	
SM City Daet		October 15, 2021	Daet	Camarines Norte	
SM City Grand Central		November 26, 2021	Caloocan	Metro Manila	
SM City Roxas		April 8, 2022	Roxas City	Capiz	
SM City Tanza		October 14, 2022	Tanza	Cavite	
SM City Sorsogon		October 28, 2022	Sorsogon City	Sorsogon	
SM City Tuguegarao		November 18, 2022	Tuguegarao	Cagayan	
SM City Bataan		May 19, 2023	Balanga	Bataan	
SM Center San Pedro		October 13, 2023	San Pedro	Laguna	
SM City Santo Tomas		October 27, 2023	Santo Tomas	Batangas	
SM City Caloocan		May 17, 2024	Caloocan	Metro Manila	
SM J Mall		October 25, 2024	Mandaue	Cebu	
SM City Laoag		May 30, 2025	Laoag	Ilocos Norte	
SM City La Union		October 17, 2025	San Fernando	La Union	
SM City Zamboanga		March 20, 2026	Zamboanga City	Zamboanga del Sur	
SM Nuvali		November 27, 2026	Santa Rosa	Laguna	

==== Other malls ====
List of other malls by SM Supermalls in the Philippines, showing the opening date and location
Name	Image	Opening Date	Location	Province/Region	Ref.
SM Quiapo		November 1972	Manila	Metro Manila	
SM Makati		September 1975	Makati	Metro Manila	
SM Delgado		May 15, 1979	Iloilo City	Iloilo	
SM Araneta City (SM Cubao)		1980	Quezon City	Metro Manila	
The Podium (SM Podium)		August 2002	Mandaluyong	Metro Manila	
SM By The Bay		November 20, 2007 (as San Miguel by the Bay); 2011 (as SM By The Bay)	Pasay	Metro Manila	

==== Malls under-construction ====
List of malls under-construction by SM Supermalls, showing the opening date and location
Name	Expected Completion	Location	Province/Region	Ref.
SM City General Trias	2027	General Trias	Cavite	
SM City Tagum	2027	Tagum	Davao del Norte	
SM City Iligan	2027	Iligan	Lanao del Norte	
SM Harrison Park	2027	Manila	Metro Manila	
SM City Tagbilaran	—N/a	Tagbilaran	Bohol	
SM City Koronadal	—N/a	Koronadal	South Cotabato	

==== Planned or proposed malls ====
List of planned or proposed malls by SM Supermalls, showing the expected completion and location
Name	Opening Date	Location	Province/Region	Ref.
SM Malolos	2028	Malolos	Bulacan	
SM Carmona	2029	Carmona	Cavite	
SM Pasay	2030	Pasay	Metro Manila	

=== China ===
List of 10 malls by SM Supermalls in China, showing the opening date and location
Name	Opening Date	Location	Province/Municipality	Ref.
SM Xiamen	December 13, 2001	Huli, Xiamen	Fujian	
SM City Jinjiang	November 26, 2005	Quanzhou	Fujian	
SM City Chengdu	October 20, 2006	Chengdu	Sichuan	
SM City Suzhou	September 23, 2011	Suzhou	Jiangsu	
SM City Chongqing	December 14, 2012	Liangjiang	Chongqing	
SM City Zibo	September 19, 2015	Zibo	Shandong	
SM City Tianjin	December 17, 2016	Binhai	Tianjin	
SM City Yangzhou	September 29, 2023	Yangzhou	Jiangsu	
SM City Haicang	October 24, 2025	Haicang, Xiamen	Fujian	
SM City Fuzhou	2027	Fuzhou	Fujian	

==== Other malls ====
List of other malls by SM Supermalls in China, showing the opening date and location
Name	Opening Date	Location	Province/Region	Ref.
SM Lifestyle Center	October 30, 2009	Xiamen	Fujian	

== Tenants and amenities ==
=== SM Cinema ===
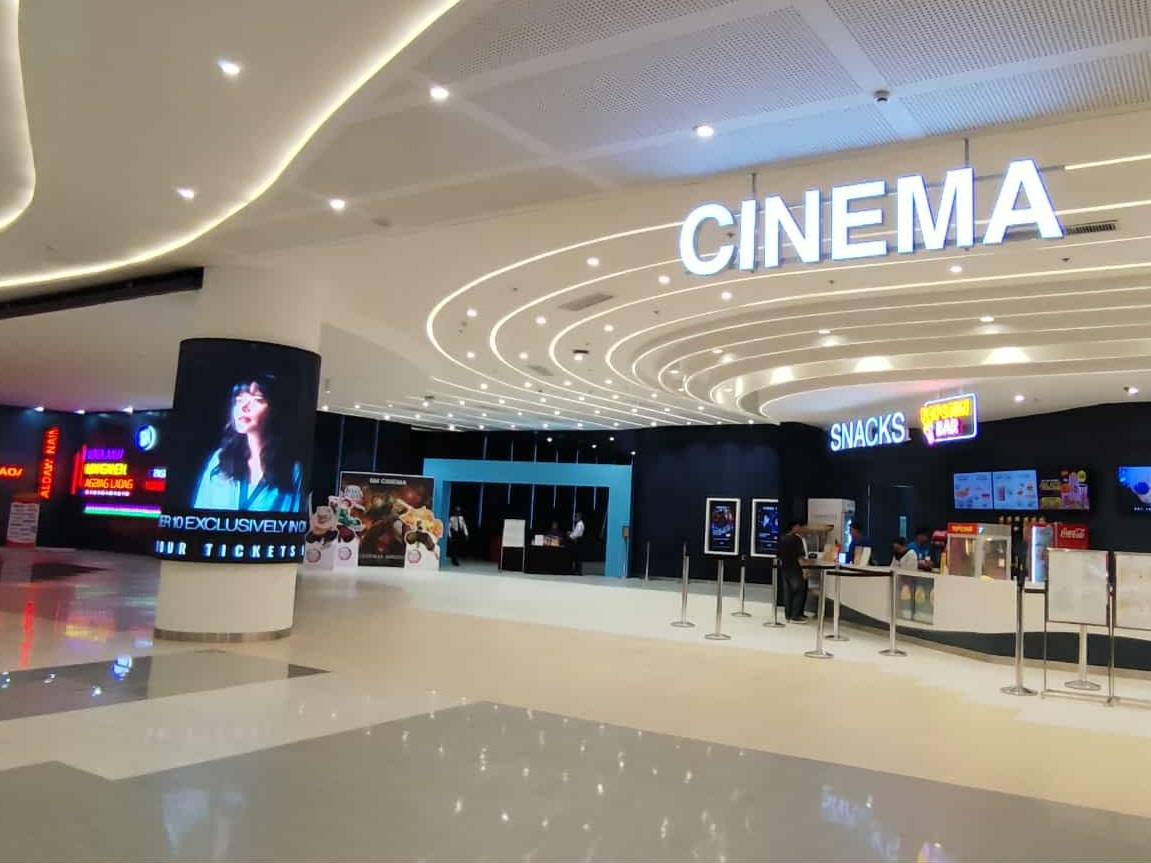
SM Cinema at SM City Laoag

SM Cinema is the movie theater chain of SM Supermalls. Originally operating under West Avenue Theatres Corporation, it is also responsible for some milestones in the Philippine film industry.

There is a policy in place since 2002, which dictates the non-airing of films rated R-18 in SM Cinemas.

There are no cinemas at some SM Center branches such as Pasig, Las Piñas, Dagupan, and San Pedro.

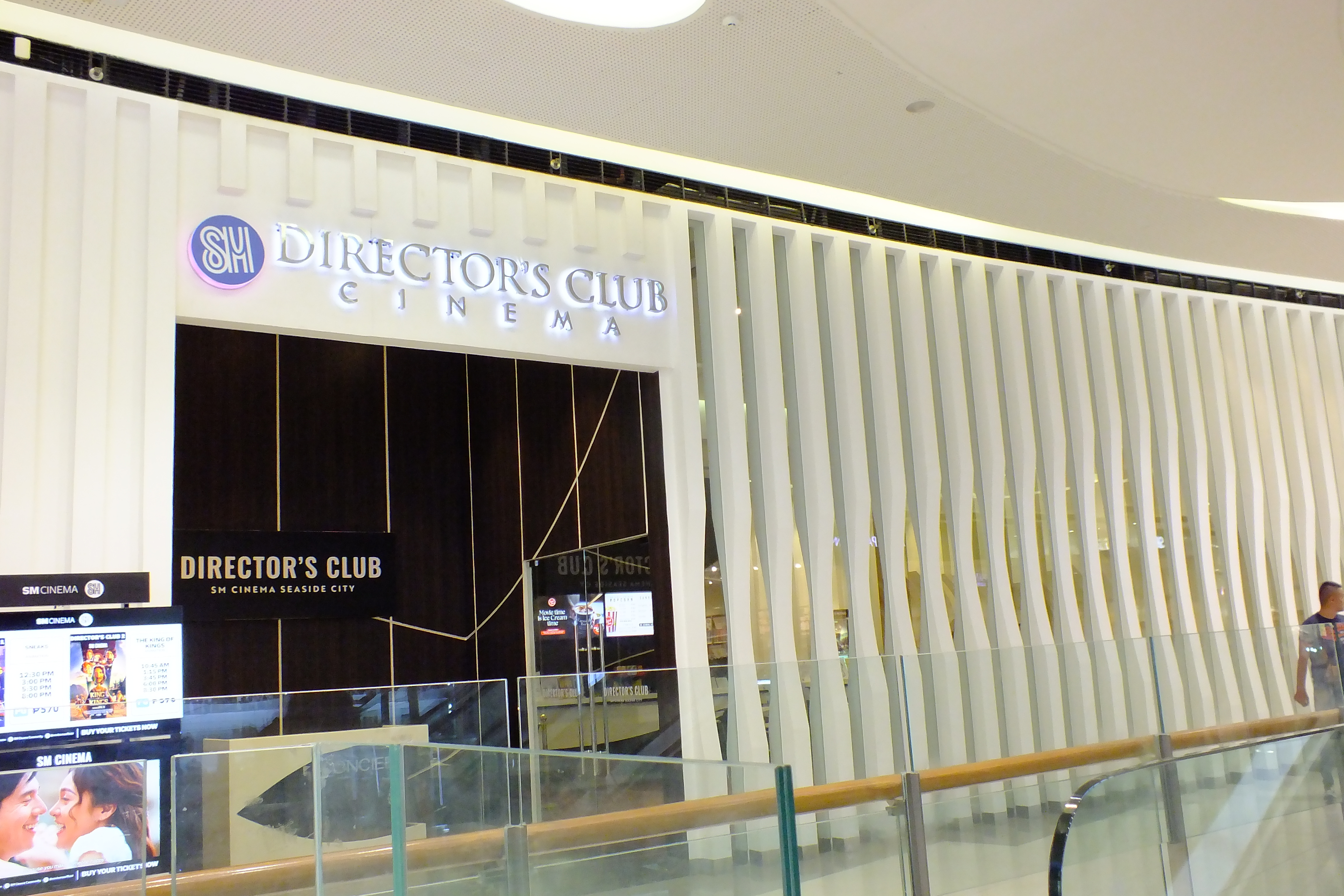
Director's Club at SM Seaside City

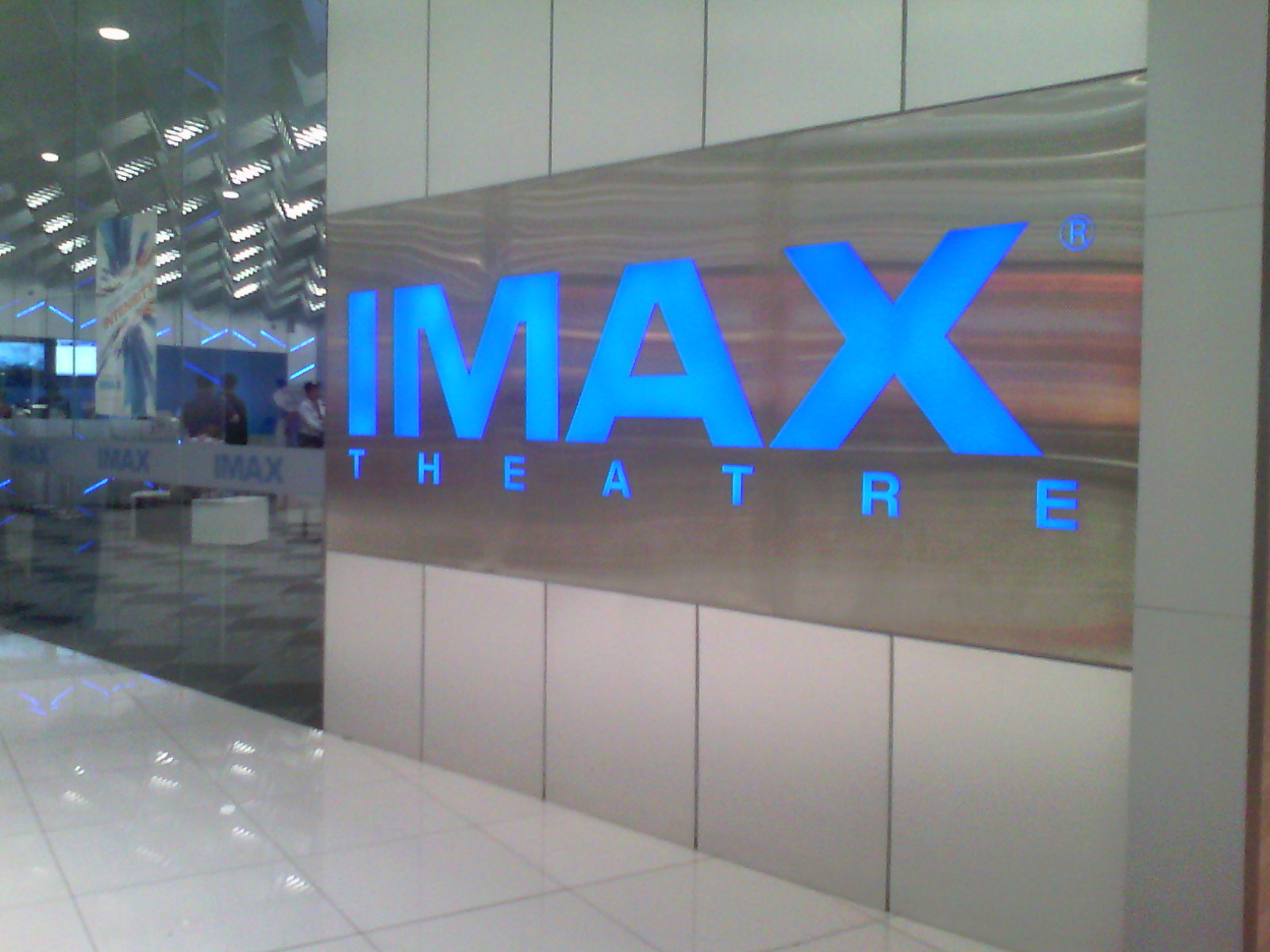
IMAX at SM Megamall

SM Cinema offers regular cinemas, Director's Club, IMAX, ScreenX and Event Screen.

==== Regular Cinemas ====
SM Cinema Theater at SM City Bacolod

Most of the regular cinemas offer digital projection and laser projection (in newer and redeveloped locations) paired with 5.1 or 7.1 surround sound audio.

The Large Screen Format is a regular cinema equipped with a screen 30% larger than the standard cinema screen size and is equipped with Dolby 7.1 surround sound system or Dolby Atmos sound system (in SM City Fairview and SM Seaside City). It opened its first branch in SM City Cabanatuan in 2015. The Large Screen Format is now part of the regular cinema lineup since SM City Iloilo (under Cinema 3).

Centerstage is a regular cinema combined with traditional theater features. Thus, it is designed to accommodate a range of events, including live musical concerts and theatrical performances. The Centerstage is currently available at SM Seaside City, it formerly operated at SM Mall of Asia until 2020.

==== Director's Club ====
The Director's Club, available at several malls, features leather-recliner-seating and butler service, equipped with Dolby 7.1 surround sound or Dolby Atmos depending on the branch. It opened its first branch at SM Mall of Asia in 2006, and it opened its newest branch at SM City Zamboanga in March 2026. It will open up the format's first LED cinema screen in the country at SM Nuvali on November 2026.

==== IMAX ====
SM Cinema operates IMAX theaters in the Philippines in partnership with IMAX Corporation. The first IMAX branch in the Philippines opened in 2006 at SM Mall of Asia. It initially had a capacity of 635 seats (later reduced to 490+ seats after renovation and Paragon 918 seating upgrade in 2019) and a screen height of 21.955 meters (72.03 ft), making it the largest cinema screen in the country. It opened its first IMAX with Laser at SM City Iloilo in November 2023.

The partnership deal will have seven IMAX with Laser upgrades and three new locations. Three locations in Metro Manila have been upgraded to IMAX with Laser in SM Aura, SM Mall of Asia, and SM North EDSA. The three new IMAX locations will be opening at regional locations such as SM Nuvali on November 2026 and marks the first IMAX location in South Luzon.

==== ScreenX ====
SM Cinema opens up the first ScreenX theater in the country at SM Mall of Asia in November 2025.

==== Event Screen ====
Event Screen is designed to host private gatherings, with a screen measuring 5.4 by 3.2 meters (18 by 10 ft). Its first branch was opened at SM City Tanza in October 2022. It also opened branches at Aura, Bataan, Bicutan, Cebu, Tuguegarao, and Urdaneta Central.

==== Other developments ====
The first drive-in theater in the Philippines was opened under the SM Cinema brand in July 2020 at SM City Pampanga.

=== SM Store ===
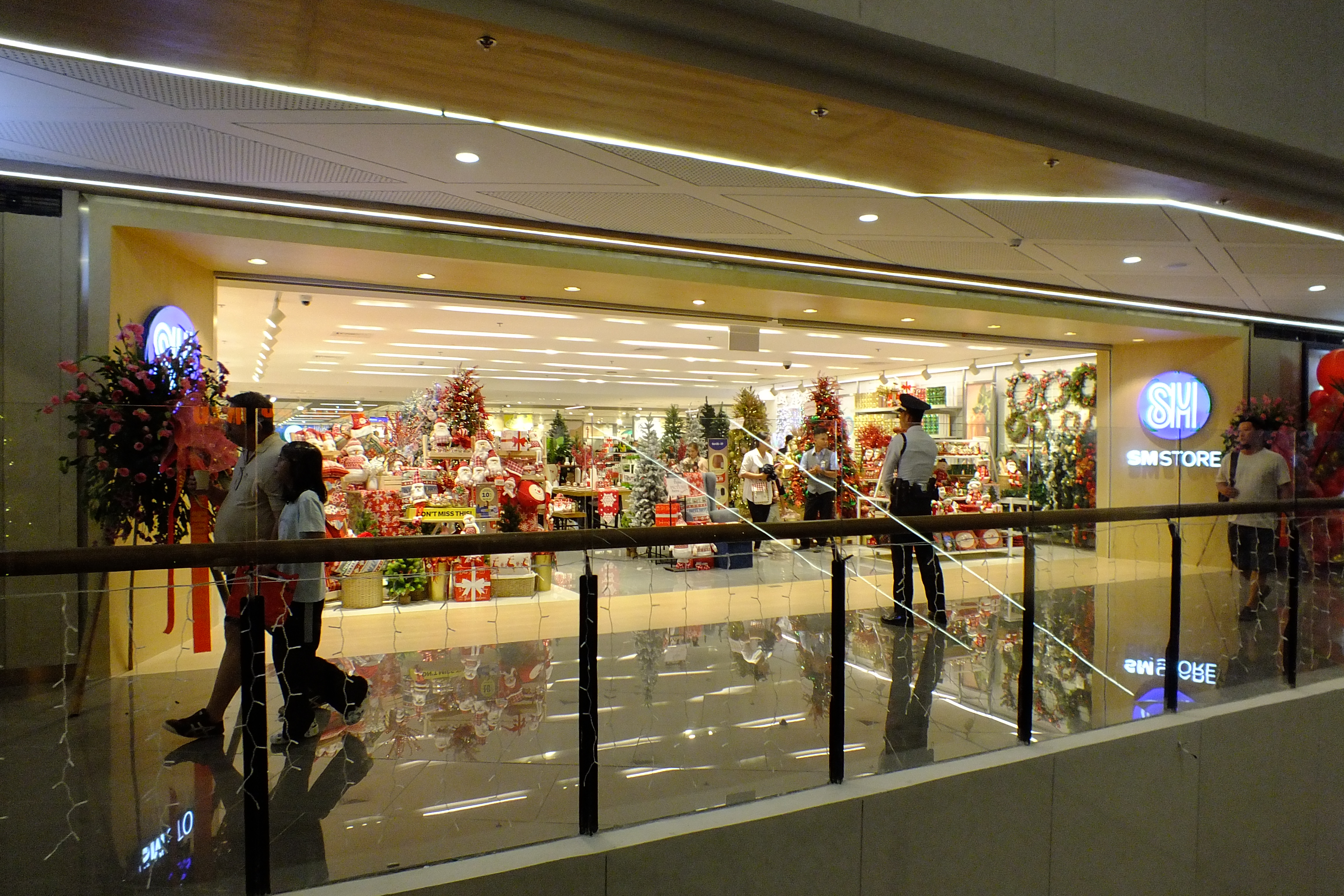
SM Store at SM J Mall

The SM Store is the department store chain of SM Supermalls. The first outlet was established in 1972 along Carriedo in Quiapo, Manila, when Shoemart store was converted into a full-fledged department store. It was renamed as the SM Department Store in 1975 prior to being rebranded as "SM Store". The SM Store would become one of SM Supermall's common anchor tenant.

=== SM Skating ===
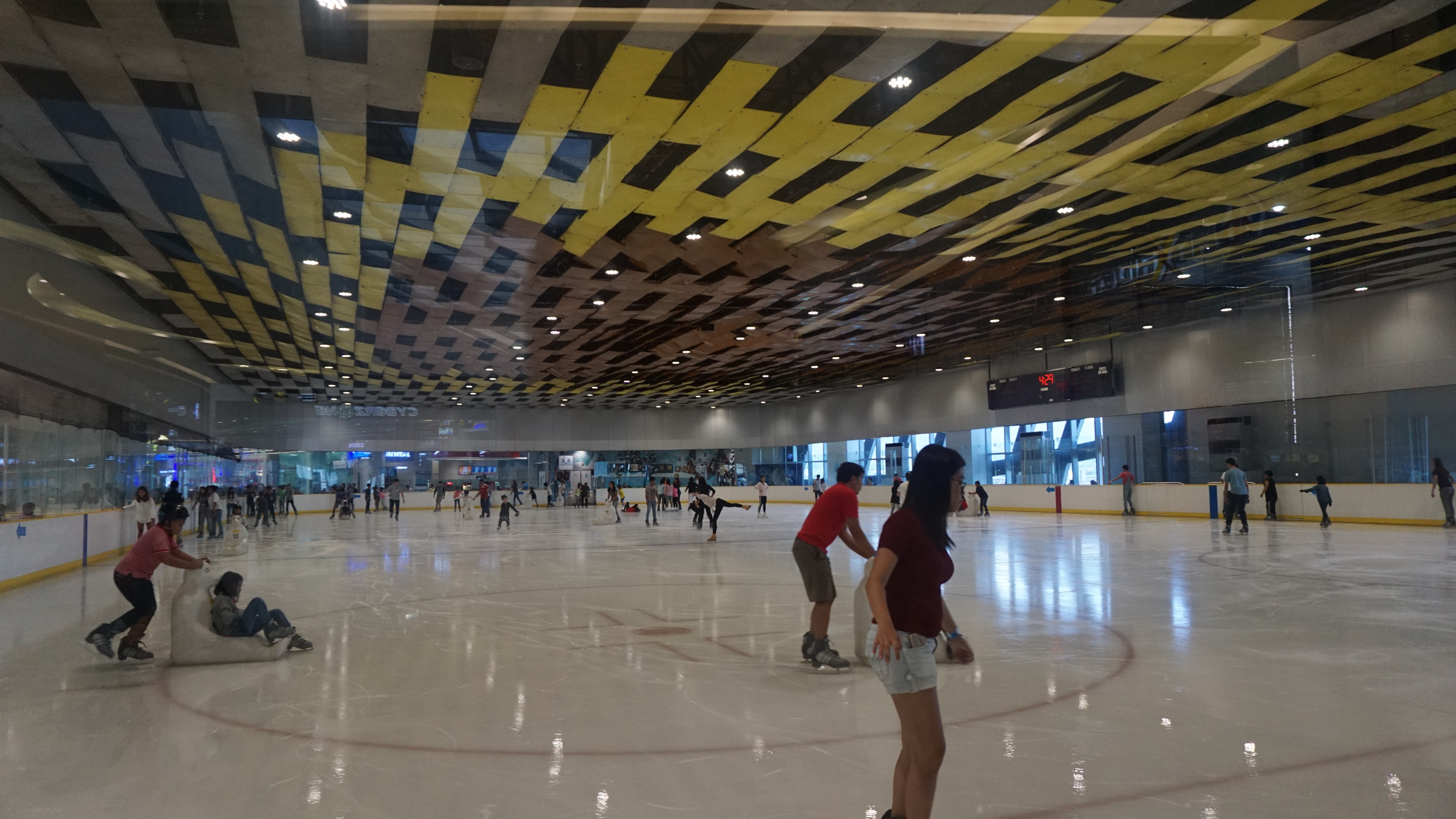
SM Skating at SM Seaside City

SM Skating is SM's indoor ice rink chain. The first rink opened at SM Megamall in 1992 which later closed in 2009, but has since reopened in 2014 at another space. It also has branches at SM Mall of Asia and SM Seaside City, and there used to be one at SM Southmall as well.

=== Recreation ===
==== SM Bowling ====
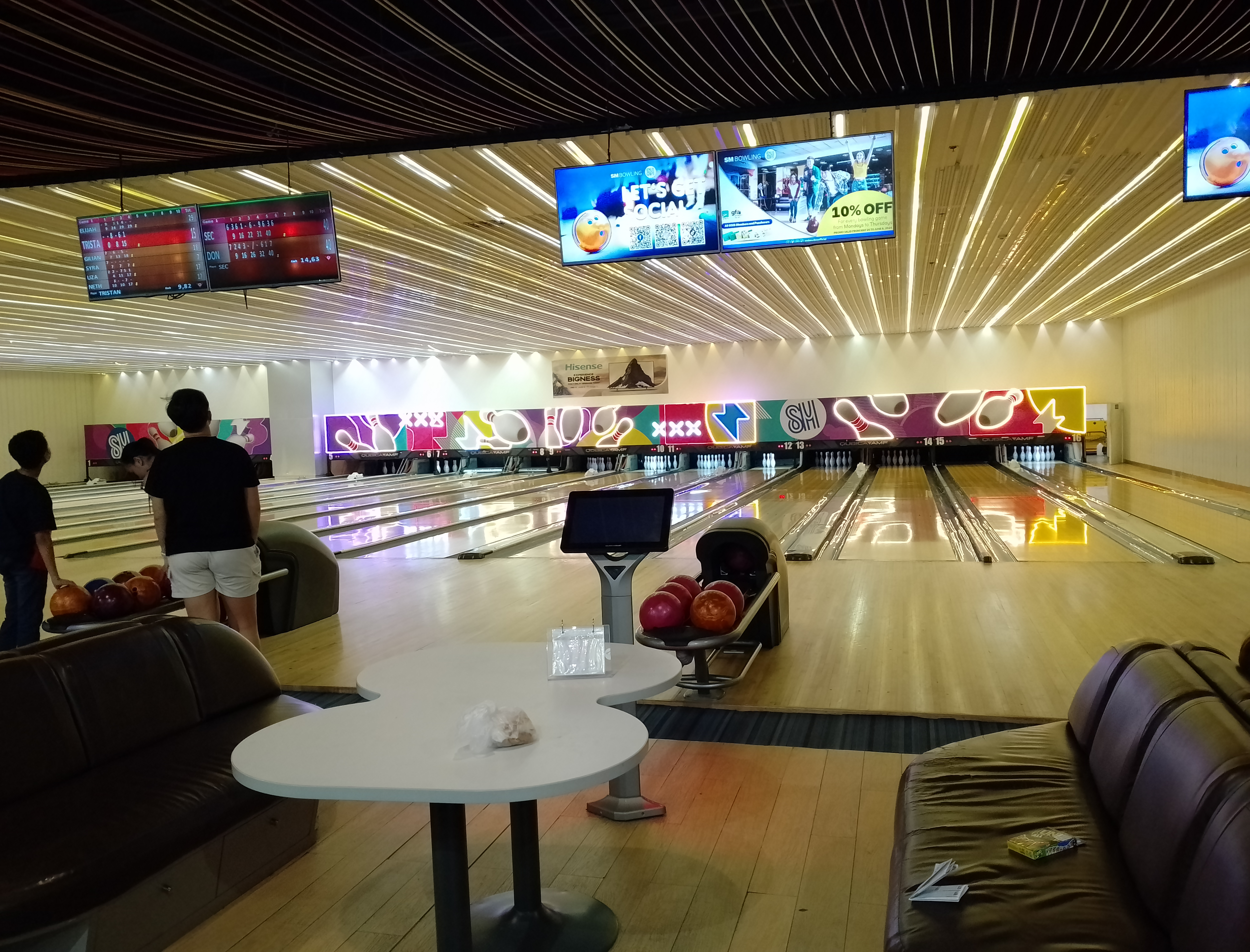
SM Bowling at SM Seaside City

SM Bowling Center, also simply known as SM Bowling, is SM's bowling alley chain. The first branch opened in 1989 at SM North EDSA, which reopened in 2009 at another space at the same Annex 2 building. Other branches are at SM Megamall, SM City Clark, SM City Cebu, SM Seaside City, and SM Lanang. Former branches at SM Southmall, SM City Fairview, SM CDO Downtown, and SM Mall of Asia have been transitioned to SM Game Park, and there was also a branch at SM Center Valenzuela.

==== SM Game Park ====
SM Game Park is a recreational and entertainment facility offering sports amenities (such as bowling, billiards, basketball, table tennis, and archery, varying by branch), a game room, arcades, karaoke, and a sports bar. The first branch opened at SM Southmall on December 10, 2021. The flagship branch is located at SM Mall of Asia. Other branches are located at SM City Fairview, SM CDO Downtown, SM Mall of Asia, SM City Santa Rosa, SM City East Ortigas, and SM City Manila.

=== SM Markets ===
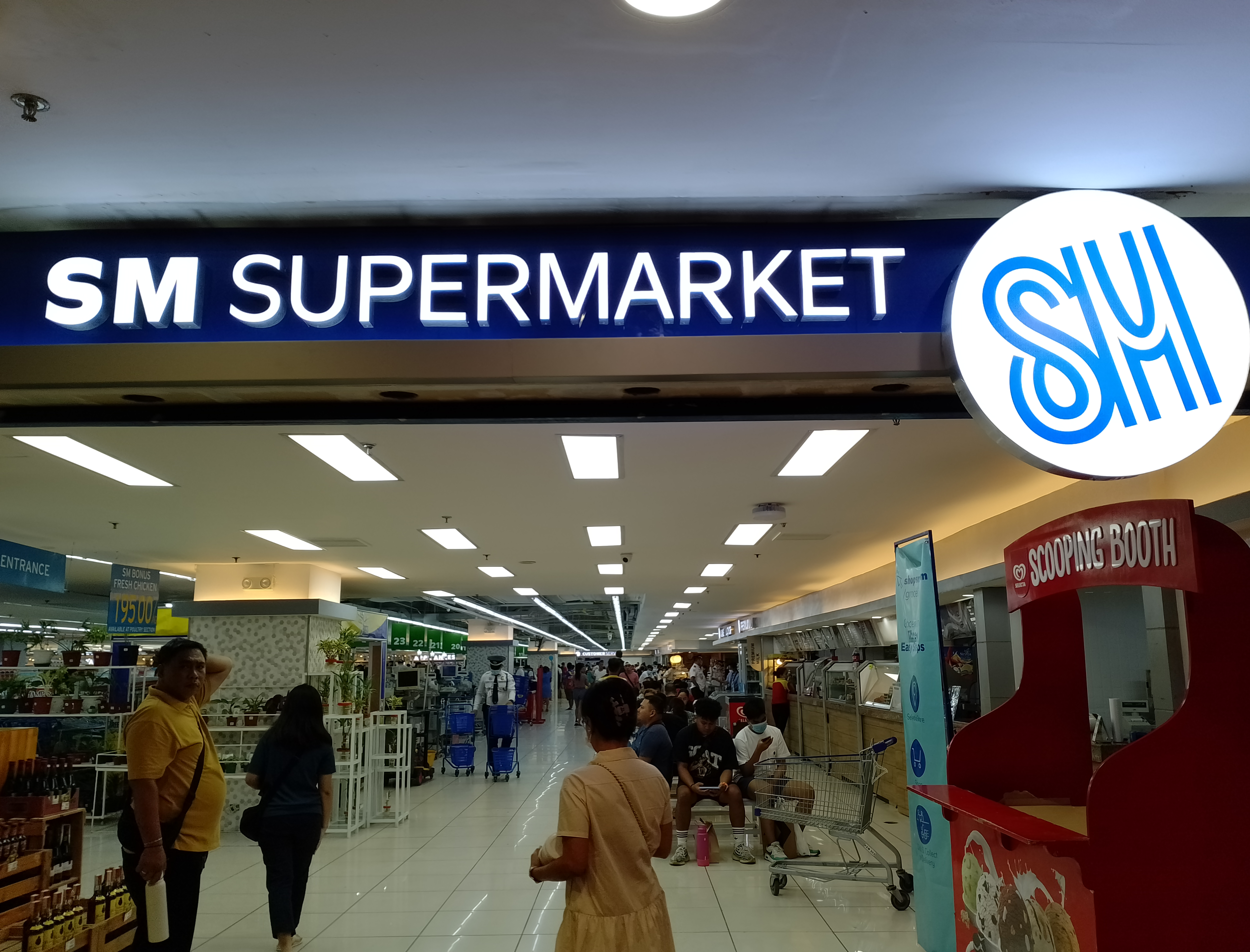
SM Supermarket branch at SM City Cebu

Every SM Supermall features supermarket chains such as SM Supermarket, SM Hypermarket, Savemore Market, and Mindpro Supermarket, collectively known as SM Markets, as anchor tenant. Most SM Supermalls house one of these brands, while some malls (including SM City Fairview and SM North EDSA) have both SM Supermarket and SM Hypermarket coexisting. Standalone Savemore malls, Hypermarket outlets, and Savemore Express Markets are also considered as outlets of SM Supermalls.

=== SM Cyberzone ===
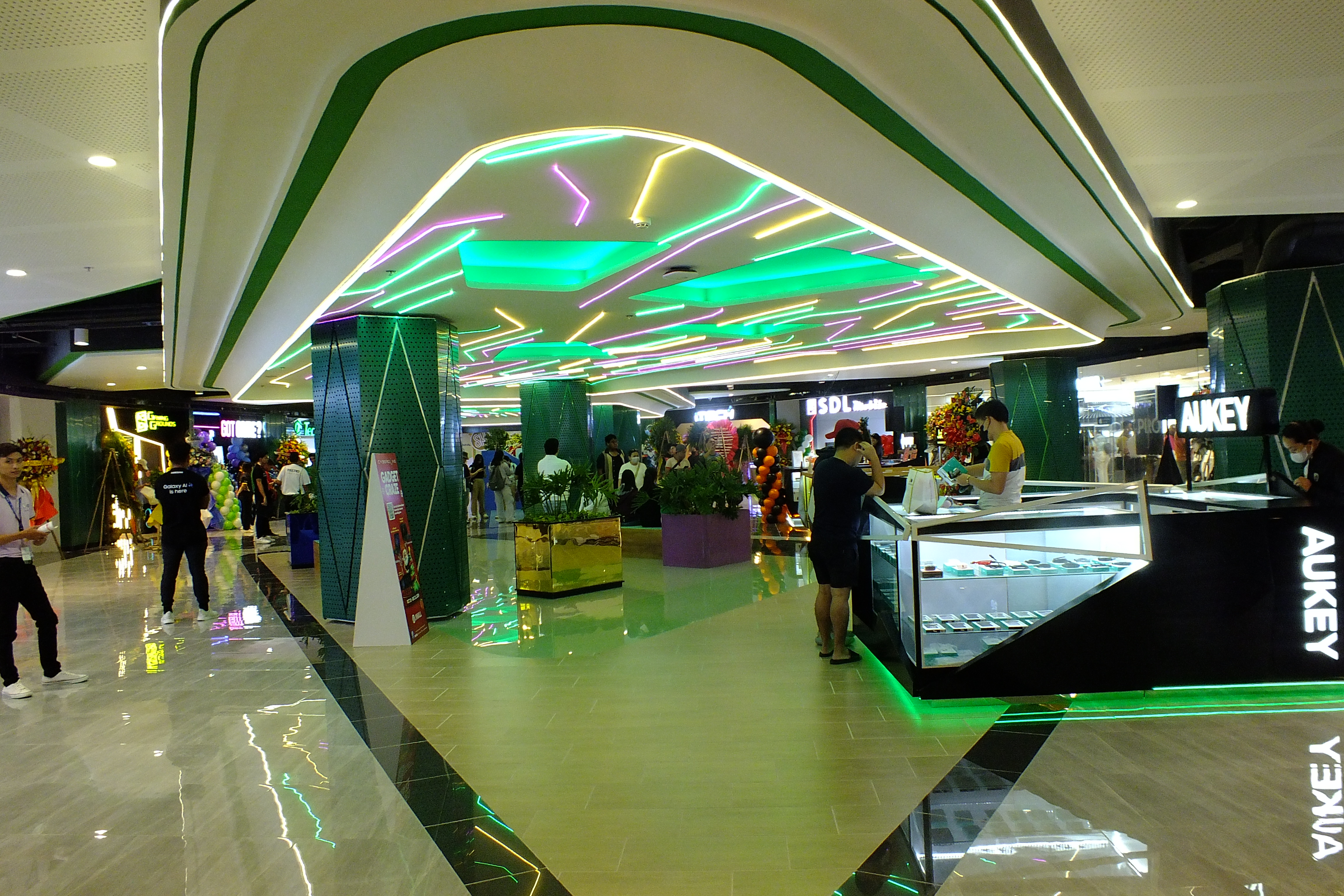
SM Cyberzone at SM J Mall

SM Cyberzone is SM's chain of IT retail stores, featuring gadget and technology retailers, concept stores of electronic brands, and telecommunications providers in dedicated areas inside SM Supermalls. It is also recognized as a hub for significant gaming and technology-related events. It originated as a lifestyle store in SM North EDSA's Carpark Building in 1998 before being rebranded to its current name.

=== Food courts ===
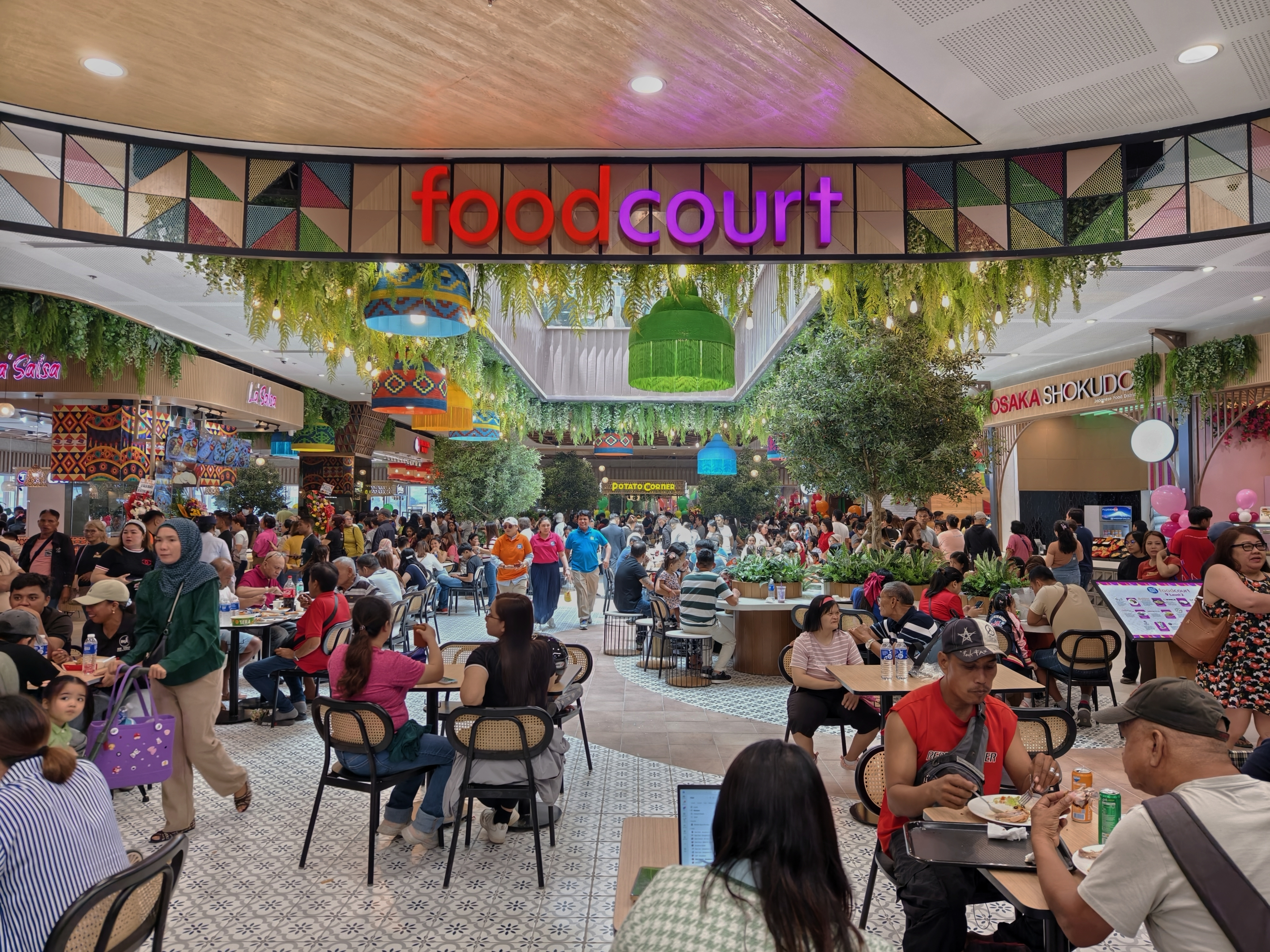
SM Foodcourt at SM City Zamboanga

SM Foodcourt is the dining subsidiary of SM Supermalls, serving as a primary anchor in most SM Supermalls. It is designed to provide a wide range of affordable dining options within a high-traffic, communal seating environment.

Several malls, including upscale ones, feature upscale iterations of the concept called the Food Hall. A unique variation, Food on Four, is located at SM Aura. This version features a more sophisticated aesthetic, upscale amenities, and a curated selection of gourmet tenants.

=== Catholic facilities and practices ===
In the Philippines, a predominantly Roman Catholic country, SM Supermall branches such as SM Aura, SM Megamall, SM North EDSA, SM City Grand Central, and SM City Cebu each feature a Catholic chapel within the mall building. In contrast, mall complexes such as SM Mall of Asia and SM Seaside City have separate church buildings within their premises.

Masses are also held at other branches in locations such as the atrium, cinema, entrances, or SM Cyberzone areas, particularly on Sundays and during Simbang Gabi. In addition, many SM Supermalls observe the 3:00 p.m. prayer, commonly associated with the Divine Mercy devotion, which is broadcast over the mall's public address system.

== Branding ==
=== Logo ===
The current logo for SM Supermalls was adopted in 2022, design by Pentagram. The logo consists of the letters "SM" in a custom typeface referred to as Henry Sans after founder Henry Sy, design by NaN and uses a shade of blue dubbed as "SM Electric Blue". It is concurrently used with the 2009 logo as it is still seen commonly nowadays even after the 2022 one was first used.
