= SM City Suzhou =

Shopping mall in Jiangsu, China

SM Suzhou
- Location: Wuzhong District, Suzhou, Jiangsu, China
- Coordinates: 31°13′00″N 120°35′34″E
- Opened: September 23, 2011; 15 years ago
- Owner: SM Prime Holdings
- Floor area: 72,552 m^{2} (780,940 sq ft)
- Website: www.smprime.com

SM Suzhou is the first SM mall in Jiangsu Province, and the fifth China mall expansion of SM Prime Holdings in the country. It has 72,552 m^{2} (780,940 sq ft) of retail space. It is owned and operated by SM Prime Holdings, under the management of Henry Sy, a Filipino-Chinese business tycoon. The mall was opened to the public on September 23, 2011.

== See also ==
- Other SM malls in China:
  - SM City Jinjiang
  - SM City Xiamen
  - SM City Chengdu
  - SM Lifestyle Center
