= SM City Tianjin =

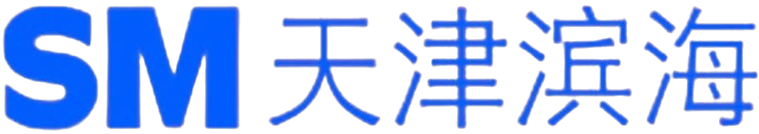

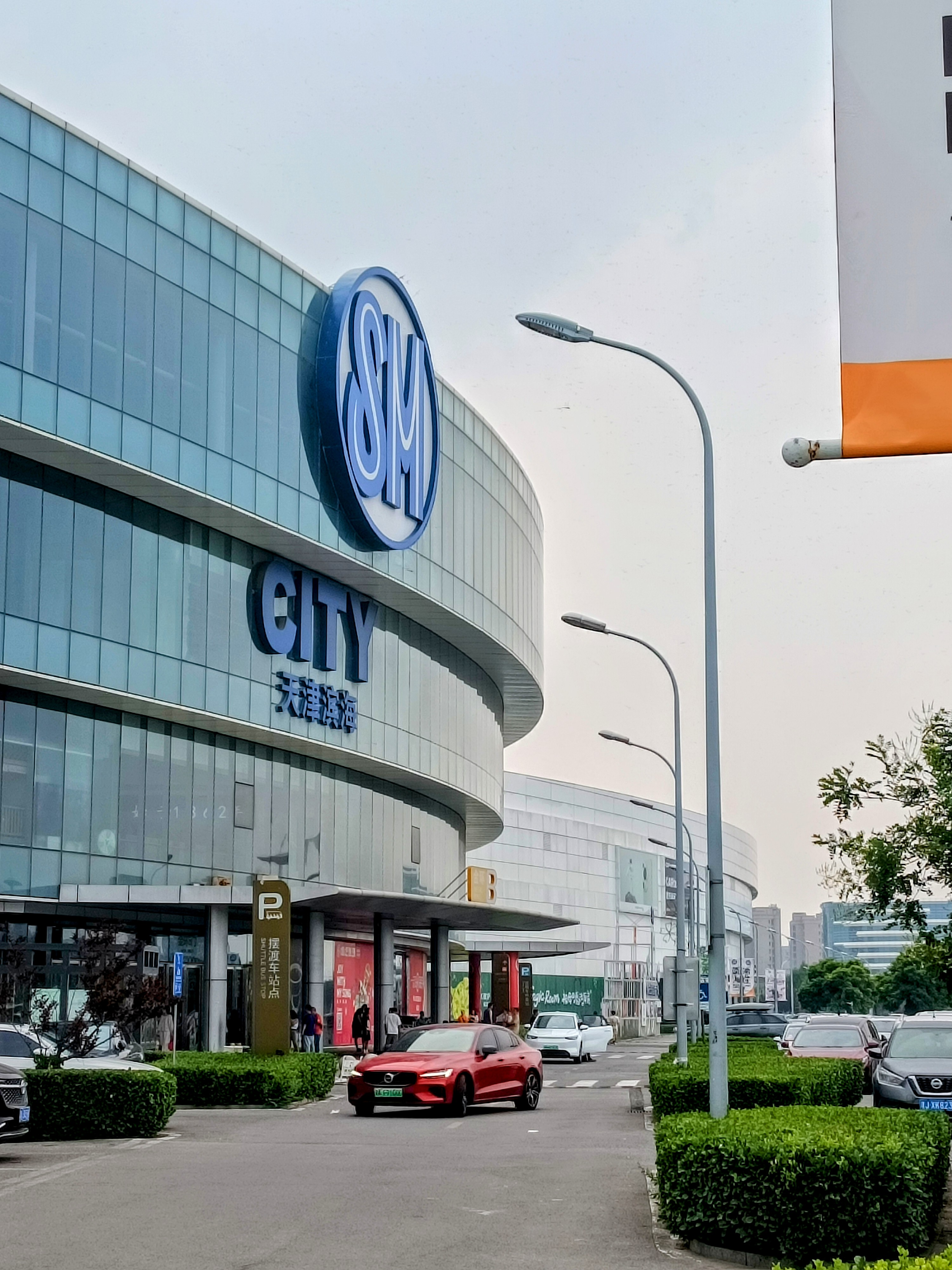
- The facade of SM City Tianjin.
- Location: Tianjin Airport Economic Area, Binhai, Tianjin, China
- Coordinates: 39°09′26″N 117°24′44″E
- Opened: 17 December 2016; 9 years ago
- Developer: SM Prime Holdings
- Website: www.smsupermalls.cn

SM City Tianjin (Chinese: SM天津滨海城市广场; pinyin: SM Tiānjīn Bīnhǎi Chéngshì Guǎngcháng; lit. 'SM Tianjin Binhai City Plaza') is a shopping mall in Tianjin, China under the Philippine mall chain SM Supermalls.

== History ==
Philippine retail conglomerate SM Group founded by Henry Sy planned to expand its shopping mall business in China. SM's first mall in China, SM City Xiamen opened in Fujian in 2001. Its strategy at that time is to open malls in "second-tier" cities such as Suzhou, Chongqing, Zibo, and Tianjin rather than Beijing and Shanghai where it deems to already have a very competitive shopping mall sector and have high property prices. The groundbreaking ceremony for SM City Tianjin was held on 26 November 2010.

SM City Tianjin opened at the Tianjin Airport Economic Area on 17 December 2016. It is the seventh mall of the Philippine mall chain SM Supermalls in China. The mall complex was designed by architecture firm ARQ. With a gross floor area of 565,000 square meters (6,080,000 sq ft), the mall was the largest SM Supermall at the time of its opening.
