= SM CDO Downtown =

- Location: Cagayan de Oro, Misamis Oriental, Philippines
- Coordinates: 8°29′3.78″N 124°39′15.56″E
- Address: Claro M. Recto Avenue corner Osmeña Street
- Opened: May 12, 2017; 9 years ago
- Previous names: SM CDO2 Premier; SM CDO Downtown Premier
- Developer: SM Prime Holdings
- Manager: SM Prime Holdings
- Architect: DSGN Associates
- Num. of stores: 200+
- Num. of anchor tenants: 16
- Floor area: 177,743 m^{2} (1,913,210 sq ft)
- Floors: Mall: 5 BPO Tower: 12
- Parking: 1,500 slots
- Website: SM CDO Downtown

SM CDO Downtown, formerly known as SM CDO Downtown Premier and sometimes called by locals as SM Downtown, is a shopping mall located along Claro M. Recto Avenue corner Osmeña Street, Cagayan de Oro, in the city's central business district. It is owned and operated by SM Prime Holdings, the largest mall operator in the Philippines, and opened on May 12, 2017. The mall is the 2nd in Northern Mindanao and 61st mall in the Philippines by the SM Group. It was the 3rd SM Supermall under the "Premier" branding (now discontinued) after SM Lanang in 2012 and SM Aura in 2013 respectively. It has a leasable area of 81,133 m^{2} and a gross floor area of 177,743 m^{2}. It was formerly the largest SM Supermall in Mindanao until SM City Davao surpassed it as the largest since 2025 due to its 2023 expansion building.

== History ==
SM CDO Downtown Premier's logo from 2017 to 2022

SM Prime Holdings President Hans Sy had previously disclosed that the site of the old Coca-Cola Plant along C.M. Recto Avenue cor. Pres. Osmeña Sts. will be developed into another SM mall. The mall would be originally called it SM CDO2 Premier (as seen in the concept art of the mall) because it was the 2nd SM mall in the CDO area. But since the old Coke plant is located in downtown CDO, the company decided that the mall will be called: SM CDO Downtown Premier and be the second SM Mall in Cagayan de Oro.

Construction of the mall started in March 2015. On March 15, 2017, tenant partners, retailers, food chains, service centers and merchants attended the tenant's preview of SM CDO Downtown Premier. On the same day, it was announced that the mall had an 85% occupancy rate.

On May 11, the mall held a blessing, mass and ribbon cutting, headed by City Mayor Oscar Moreno and some City officials; Hans T. Sy, Felicidad Sy and Jeffrey Lim, SM Executives; and Archbishop Antonio Ledesma, SJ. Shops were opened on that day for the invited guests. On May 12, SM CDO Downtown Premier opened its doors to the public opening only four levels of the mall with an 87% occupancy rate.

On the mall's opening day, SM Cinema only opened 2 regular cinemas (Cinemas 3 & 4), and a large-format cinema (Megascreen). On May 30, it finally opened the two Director's Club Cinemas and the two other regular cinemas (Cinemas 1 & 2), opening all of its 7 cinemas to moviegoers.

On June 9, almost a month after the mall's opening, SM opened the fifth level of the mall, making all levels open to the public. The opening was attended by City Mayor Oscar Moreno, together with some city officials, as well as some SM officials. The fifth level consists of shops, homegrown restaurants, along with the Sky Garden and Sky Hall. The Sky Hall is still closed to the public. The first bowling center in Northern Mindanao opened on the 4th level as well nearly two years later on May 4, 2019.

On October 17, 2018, the BPO tower was finally opened for leasing.

On April 2, 2023, the mall was renamed to simply as SM CDO Downtown as part of a rebranding by SM Supermalls to unify with other premier malls that don't carry the "Premier" branding.

== Features ==
The five-storey mall features anchor stores like SM Store with three levels of shopping space, SM Supermarket and SM Cinema, with seven theaters. It has service centers, specialty stores and restaurants and indoor parking spaces.

Underneath the mall is a rainwater catchment basin measuring 75 by 40 meters (246 ft × 131 ft) floor area and as high as 6 meters (20 ft) which can hold up to 13,650 cubic meters (482,000 cu ft) of water to reduce the risk of flooding.

One of the mall's main attractions is the first-ever large-screen format theater in the city, called Megascreen, equipped with a Christie 6P laser projection system that produces images and reproduction of colors from the actual movie set and uses Dolby Atmos Sound System on Christie Vive Speakers, along with two Director's Club theaters for cinema comfort and four digital cinemas offering 2D and 3D technologies to movie-goers.

The mall also features a bowling center, a food hall, a sky hall with 800 seats, an al fresco dining and entertainment Sky Garden, and a central architectural feature called "Glass Curtain" which brings much of the natural light into the mall structure, and reflects lights from incoming cars on the CM Recto and Osmeña roads. This creates an effect that lights are falling down to a water fountain below it, leading to the main entrance.

DSGN Associates, an award-winning architectural firm based in Texas, United States, designed the mall.

=== CDO Downtown Tower ===
The CDO Downtown Tower is a 12-storey BPO tower located along Osmeña Street. It has helipad and eight levels of office spaces for BPO companies, as well as the Northern Mindanao regional office of the Department of Foreign Affairs. It was launched on October 17, 2018.

OP360, an IT company based in Ridgefield, Connecticut, opened a branch in the SM CDO Downtown Tower back on March 13, 2024.

== See also ==
- SM City CDO Uptown
- SM Lanang Premier
- SM Supermalls
- List of largest shopping malls in the world
- List of largest shopping malls in the Philippines
- List of shopping malls in the Philippines

Preceded by SM City East Ortigas	62nd SM Supermall; 2017	Succeeded by S Maison at Conrad Manila
