= SM City Tanza =

Shopping mall in Cavite, Philippines

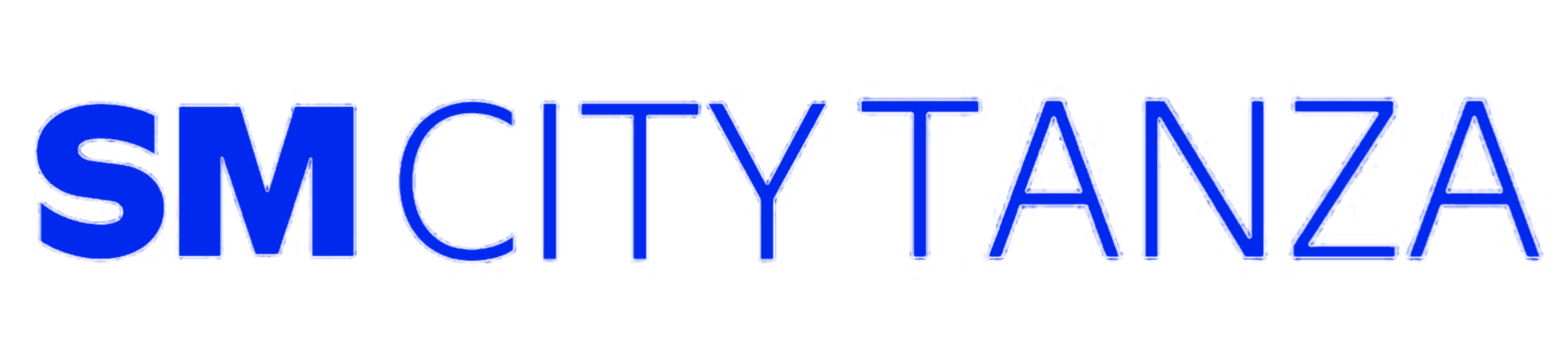

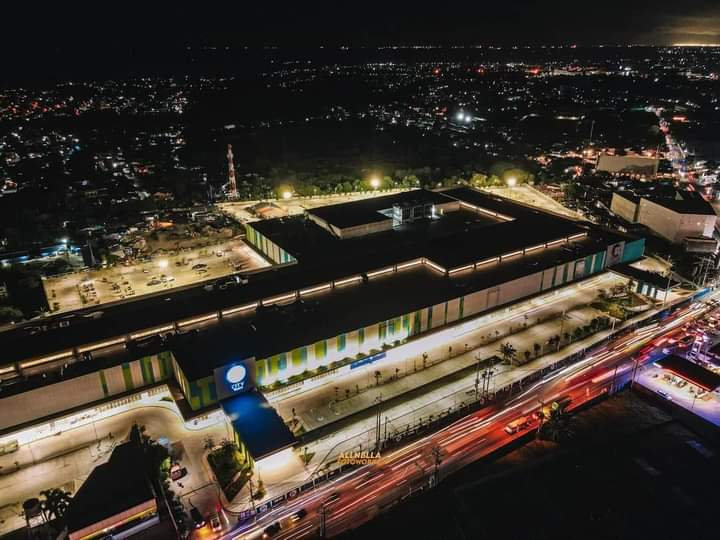
- Aerial view of SM City Tanza at night
- Location: Tanza, Cavite, Philippines
- Coordinates: 14°23′29″N 120°51′03″E
- Address: Antero Soriano Highway corner Dr. Solis St., Daang Amaya 2
- Opened: October 14, 2022; 4 years ago
- Developer: SM Prime Holdings
- Manager: SM Prime Holdings
- Architect: Asya Design
- Num. of stores: 200+
- Num. of anchor tenants: 11
- Floor area: 60,029 m^{2} (646,150 sq ft)
- Floors: 2
- Parking: 800+
- Public transit: 28 Tanza
- Website: SM City Tanza

SM City Tanza is a shopping mall owned by SM Prime Holdings. It is the seventh SM Supermall to be opened in Cavite, the first SM Supermall in Tanza, and the 79th in the country. It is located along Antero Soriano Highway corner Dr. Solis Street, Daang Amaya 2, Tanza, Cavite. It has a land area of 8.67 hectares (21.4 acres) and a total gross floor area of 60,029 m^{2} (646,150 sq ft), making it the fourth largest shopping mall in the province after SM City Trece Martires. The two-story mall opened with 89% of the available space leased.

== History ==
SM Supermalls, a subsidiary of SM Prime, the largest mall operator in the country, since 2014 is negotiating with other land owners near Antero Soriano Highway in Barangay Daang Amaya 2 on their plan to build a new SM Mall in the town. Clearing operations and fencing of the SM City Tanza site started in 2018 and continued until the construction began in May 2020. SM City Tanza is SM Prime Holdings' 79th Supermall. It is also the seventh mall in the province of Cavite after SM City Bacoor, SM City Dasmariñas, SM City Molino, SM City Rosario, SM City Trece Martires, and SM Center Imus. The mall blessing and ribbon-cutting ceremony was held on October 13, a day before the mall's grand opening on October 14, 2022, making it the seventh SM Supermall in Cavite and the 79th in the country.

Prior to its opening, during his speech at the 108th Tanza Day. Mayor Yuri A. Pacumio, said approximately five months before the mall's opening that he "can’t wait for the opening of the new SM" as the mall would bring both new shopping options and job opportunities for residents.

In June 2022, around 1,000 senior citizens and persons with disabilities from Tanza sought jobs at the mall during a recruitment event. Mayor Pacumio said that 80% of the jobs were expected to be filled by Tanza residents.

== Features ==
=== Design ===
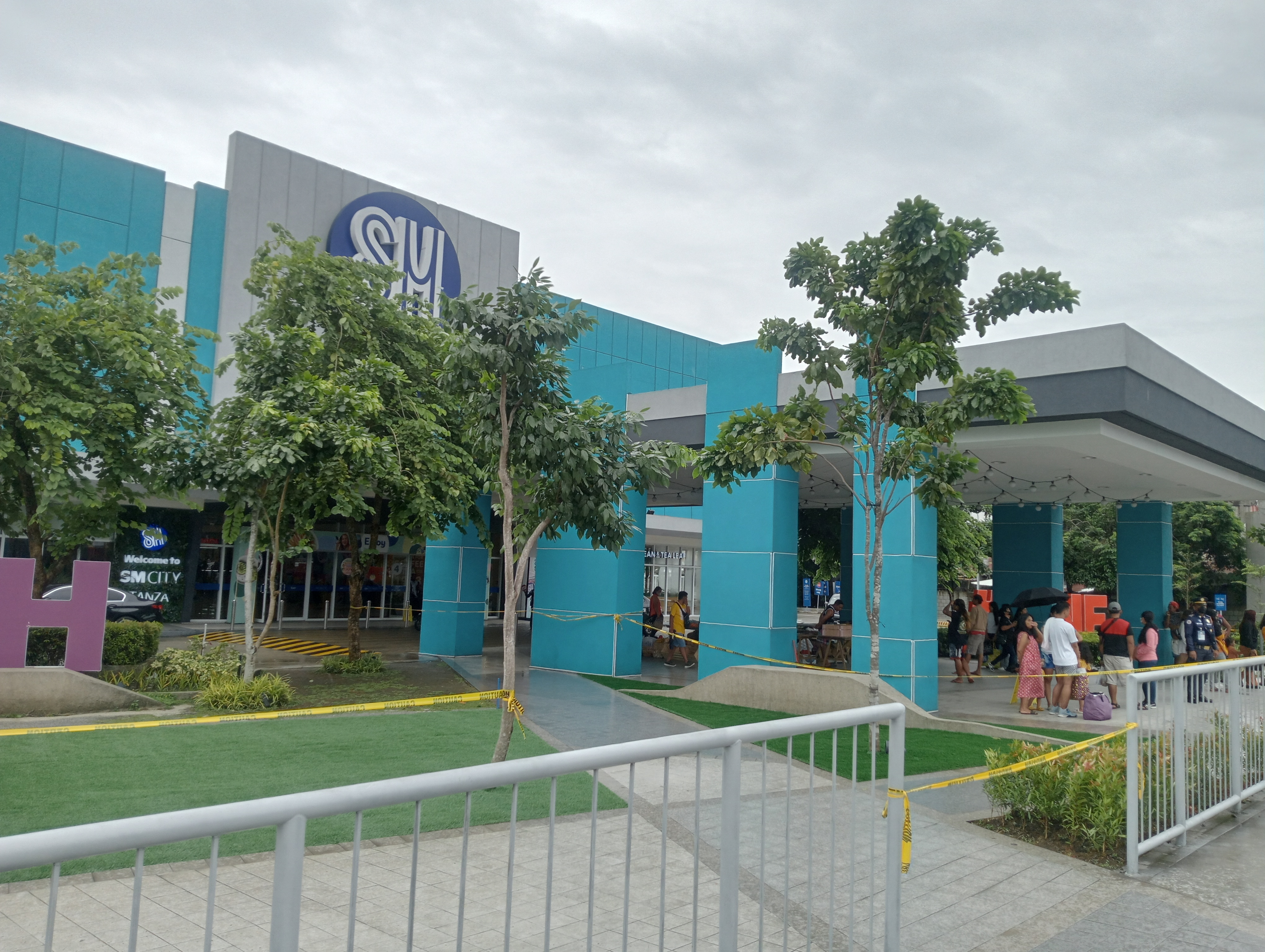
Main entrance of SM City Tanza

The two-story and nearly 60,000 m^{2} (650,000 sq ft) mall's design was inspired by the chief means of livelihood in Tanza, which were farming and fishing, as well by the nearby beach resorts along the coastline. Symbolizing warmth from the colors of the boats and the serenity of the sea, SM City Tanza's interiors have been configured in an L-shaped layout and provided with natural clerestory light that stretched across the mall area, including the Cyberzone.

The ceiling incorporates curved cove lighting designed to evoke the appearance of water ripples. The mall also includes a 1,500 square metre (16,000 sq ft) events centre used for activities and exhibitions. In addition, a landscaped indoor area provides space for visitors to sit, shop, and dine.

=== Tenants ===
Tenants include SM Store, SM Supermarket, Ace Hardware, SM Appliance Center, Watsons, Pet Express, Miniso, Uniqlo, Crocs, Surplus and BDO.. The mall has five cinemas which includes the SM Event Screen, the first SM Mall to have it.

== Incident ==
- On May 28, 2023, at the front of the mall, a traffic enforcer was shot and killed by an intoxicated motorcycle rider after apprehending the rider. The suspect then fled the area on his motorcycle together with his accomplice. Both suspects surrendered themselves to the authorities.

Preceded by SM City Roxas	80th SM Supermall; 2022	Succeeded by SM City Sorsogon
