= SM City Puerto Princesa =

SM Supermalls In Puerto Princesa

- Location: Puerto Princesa, Palawan
- Coordinates: 9°44′36″N 118°44′22″E
- Opened: September 15, 2017; 9 years ago
- Developer: SM Prime Holdings
- Manager: SM Prime Holdings
- Architect: DSGN Associates
- Num. of stores: 180 shops
- Floor area: 53,203 m^{2} (572,670 sq ft)
- Parking: 398
- Website: SM City Puerto Princesa

SM City Puerto Princesa is a SM Supermall in the Philippines and the first in the Mimaropa region. It is located at the corner of Malvar and Lacao street in Puerto Princesa City, Palawan. It was inaugurated on September 15, 2017 on a Friday. It is owned and operated by SM Prime Holdings, and has a gross floor area of 53,203 square meters. It hosts its anchor tenants SM Store at its lower and upper ground floors, and SM Supermarket on its lower ground floor facing Malvar street.

== Layout ==
SM City Puerto Princessa was one of the first malls in Palawan. The mall has three levels of retail and dining spaces, as well as a three screen digital cinema with seating capacity of 474 which holds 158 persons per screen, and two Director's Club Cinemas with seating capacity of 96 which holds 48 persons per screen.

The first level or lower ground floor is directly accessible from Malvar street and features a gallery of cafe and food chains on its perimeter as well as a Supermarket. The second level is also accessible street side but on Lacao street. One of the Lacao street entrance leads directly to SM Store, a department store with 2 selling levels with around 7,205 square meters of selling area. The third level, formally the second floor (2F), is commonly mistaken as third floor. This houses the SM Cyberzone, a collective of tech related stores and kiosks. 2F also features a band of clerestory windows that provide daylighting to the main hallways of the mall. The clerestory window is pursuant to the Philippine Green Building Code, provision of such fenestration facilitates minimal usage of artificial lighting especially at the third level, or 2F.

| Preceded by SM Cherry Antipolo | 64th SM Supermall; 2017 | Succeeded by SM Center Tuguegarao Downtown |
