= SM City La Union =

Shopping mall in San Fernando, La Union

- Location: San Fernando, La Union, Philippines
- Coordinates: 16°37′32″N 120°19′23″E
- Address: Along Diversion Road, Barangay Biday
- Opened: October 17, 2025; 12 months ago
- Developer: SM Prime Holdings
- Manager: SM Prime Holdings
- Floor area: 59,000 square metres (640,000 sq ft)
- Floors: 4: Roofdeck Parking; Second Level; Upper Ground Level; Lower Ground Level
- Parking: 1,104
- Website: SM City La Union

SM City La Union is a shopping mall owned by SM Prime Holdings. It is located at Along Diversion Road, Barangay Biday, San Fernando, La Union. It is the fifth and second largest SM Supermall in Ilocos Region, the first in the province of La Union, and 89th in the Philippines. It is owned and operated by SM Prime Holdings. It has a total retail area of 61,000 sq.m. and a total gross floor area of 112,000 sq.m.

== History ==
The mall opened on October 17, 2025.

== Features ==
SM Prime Holdings expects the mall as a new lifestyle landmark in the province, incorporating local elements and a "surfer vibe", that the province is well-known for. It also has 1,348-square-meter (14,510 sq ft) sandbox, an outdoor venue for sports tournaments, mini concerts and other community activities.This SM mall has its unique LED stairs creating a surfing vibe.

== See also ==
- SM Supermalls
- SM City Laoag

Preceded by SM City Laoag	89th SM Supermall; 2025	Succeeded by SM City Zamboanga
