= SM Center Tuguegarao Downtown =

Shopping mall in Tuguegarao City, Philippines

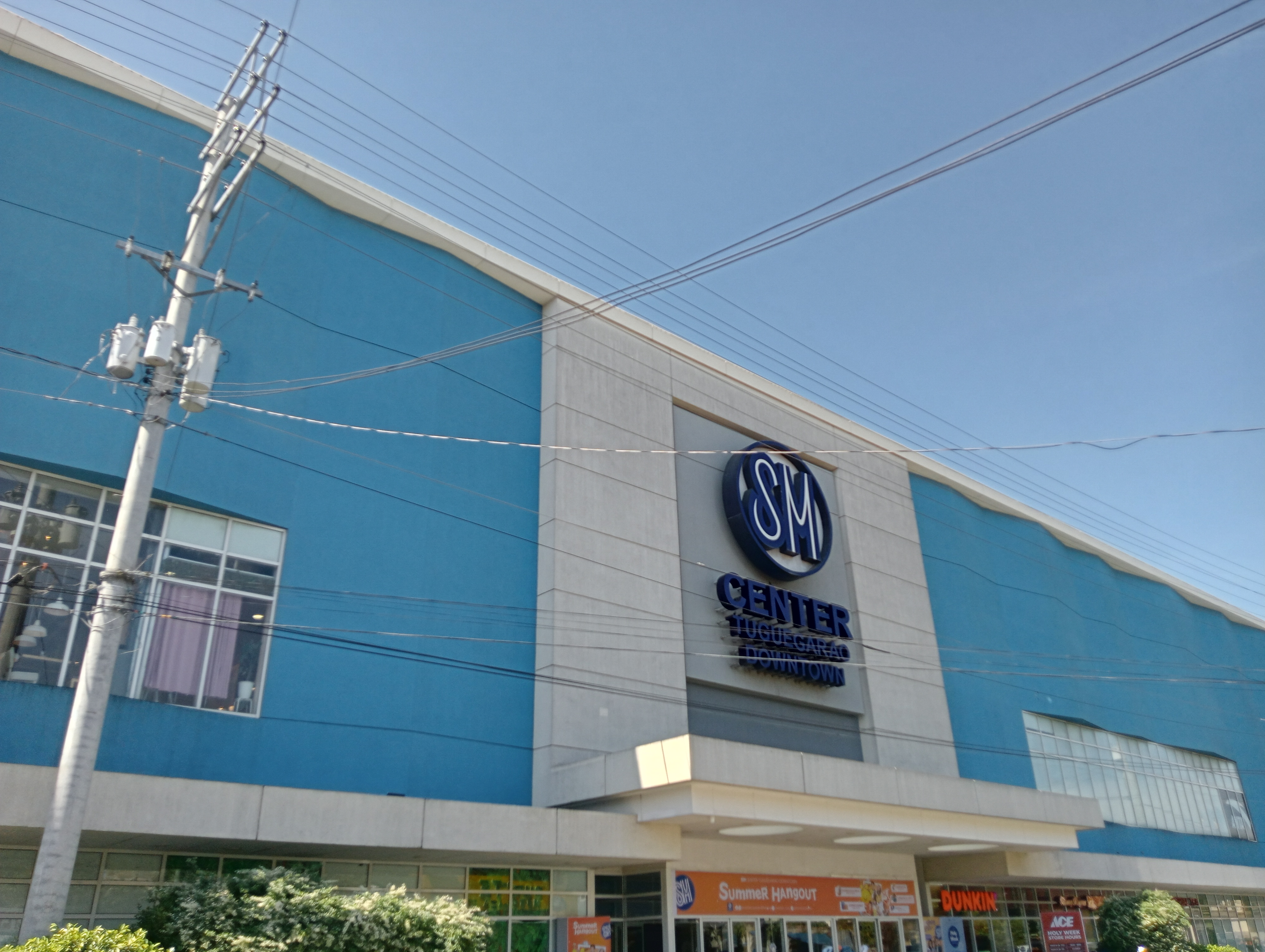
- The facade of SM Center Tuguegarao Downtown in March 2024
- Location: Tuguegarao, Philippines
- Coordinates: 17°36′45.72″N 121°43′24.9″E
- Address: Luna St. cor. Mabini St., Barangay Ugac Sur
- Opened: October 12, 2017; 9 years ago
- Developer: SM Prime Holdings
- Manager: SM Prime Holdings
- Owner: Henry Sy, Sr.
- Architect: DSGN Associates
- Num. of stores: 130+
- Num. of anchor tenants: 5
- Floor area: 33,301 m^{2} (358,450 sq ft)
- Floors: 3
- Parking: 472 slots
- Website: SM Center Tuguegarao Downtown

SM Center Tuguegarao Downtown is a shopping mall owned and operated by SM Prime Holdings, the largest mall operator in the Philippines, located in the city's business district along Luna St. cor. Mabini St., Tuguegarao City, Cagayan.

The mall opened on October 12, 2017 as the first SM Supermall in Cagayan and the second in Cagayan Valley with a gross floor area of 33,301 m^{2} (358,450 sq ft).

== History ==
Last 2015, SM Prime Holdings set aside P65 billion capex for the opening of malls in 2016 located in San Jose del Monte City, Bulacan, Trece Martires City, Cavite, Tuguegarao City, Cagayan, Puerto Princesa City, Palawan and Urdaneta City, Pangasinan.

SM Center Tuguegarao Downtown is strategically located at the corner of Luna and Mabini Streets, which are main thoroughfares of the city. It will serve customers not only in the city but also the province of Cagayan and nearby towns. It is highly accessible via Buntun Bridge all the way to Ugac Highway from the municipalities of Enrile and Solana, via Maharlika Highway from the municipality of Iguig as well as from the neighboring province of Isabela with transportation routes of jeepneys and buses coming all the way from the different trade centers of the region.

Construction of the mall started in the first quarter of 2016. Hours before the grand opening, the mall held a mass, coin throwing and ribbon cutting led by SM Prime Holdings’ Non Executive Director Herbert Sy, Tuguegarao City Mayor Jefferson Soriano, Vice Mayor Bienvenido de Guzman II, Cagayan Governor Manuel Mamba, and Tuguegarao Archbishop Sergio Utleg. Amid raising of Public Storm Warning Signal No. 1 due to tropical depression Odette, the mall opened on October 12, 2017, with 90% of its space lease-awarded.

SM administration said the recorded foot traffic during the opening day was 31,230 as of 6pm.

== Features ==
The mall's interior

SM Center Tuguegarao Downtown has taken great care during the design and throughout construction to preserve two large trees along Mabini Street, serving as shady tree canopies at the east entrance of the mall.

The three-storey mall features its major anchor SM Hypermarket and other household brands such as SM Appliance Center, World Balance, ACE Hardware, Surplus, Watsons, Miniso, Simply Shoes and BDO. It also has specialty stores, wellness and services, homegrown restaurants, amusement centers, fashion boutiques and the I.T. Zone at the third level. In addition to parking slots at the front, a two-storey parking area is also located at the mall's back portion for customer convenience.

SM Game Park was opened in April 2025 at the mall's second level with amenities for indoor recreation such as pool tables and karaoke rooms. Additionally, a portion of the third level was renovated to make way for SM Foodcourt, the second in the city, opened on October 29, 2025 featuring homegrown restaurants.

The mall uses LED lighting and has solar panels with a yield of 484 KW installed on the roofdeck. It also features a rainwater catchment with a volume of 215 m^{3}.

DSGN Associates, an award-winning architectural firm based in Texas, United States, designed the mall.

== Gallery ==
SM Center Tuguegarao Downtown in 2017

SM Center Tuguegarao Downtown in December 2018 featuring its year's Christmas Tree

SM Center Tuguegarao Downtown along Luna Street

Goldilocks inside SM Hypermarket

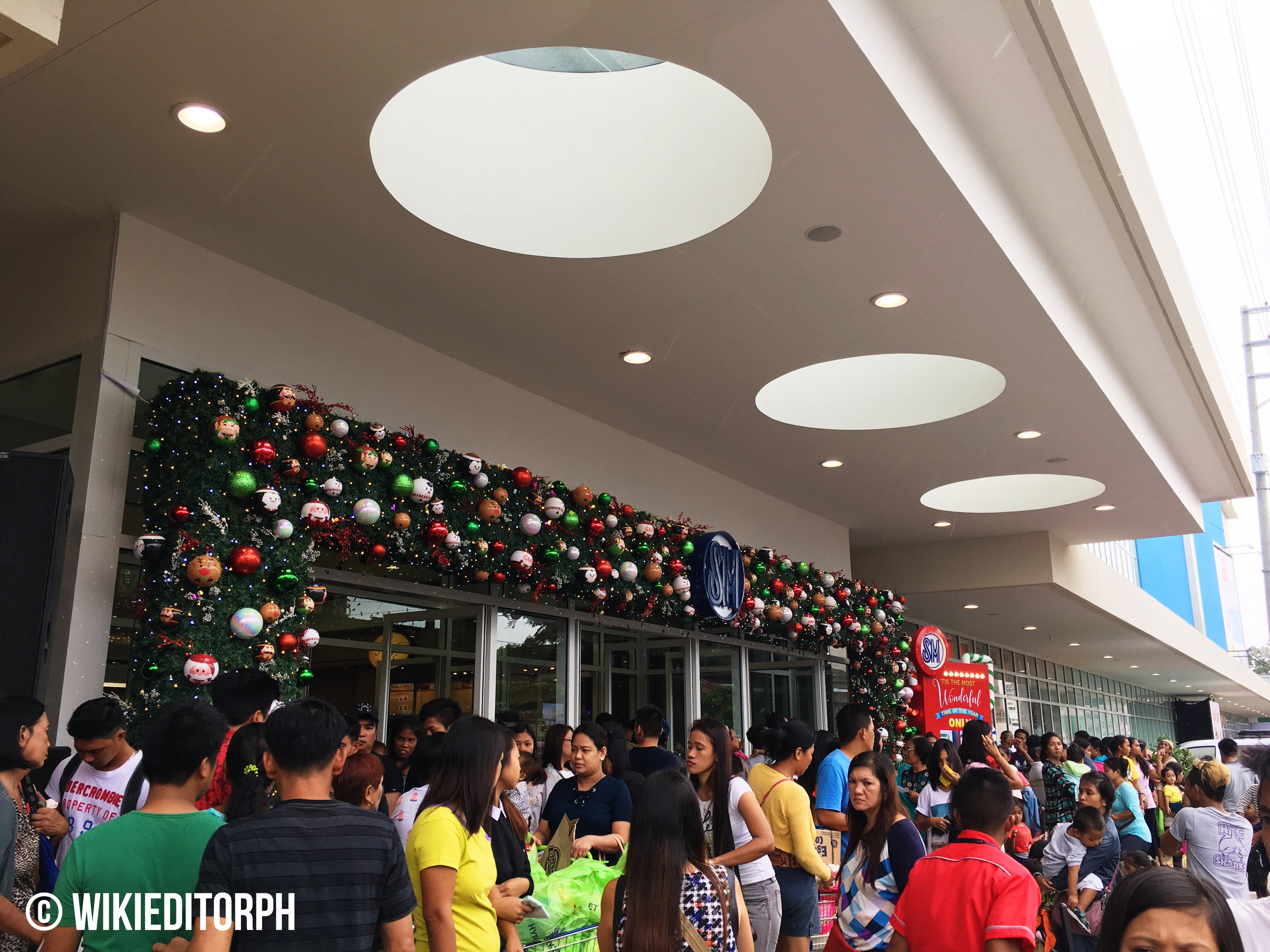
The mall's main entrance

== See also ==
- SM City Cauayan
- Robinsons Santiago
- Robinsons Tuguegarao

Preceded by SM City Puerto Princesa	65th SM Supermall; 2017	Succeeded by SM Center Pulilan
