= SM City Laoag =

Shopping mall in Laoag, Philippines

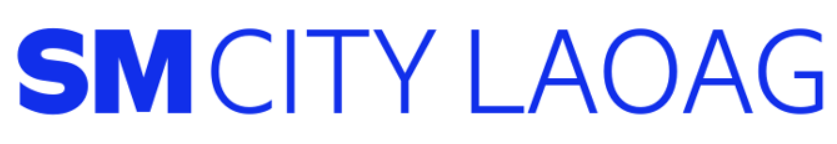

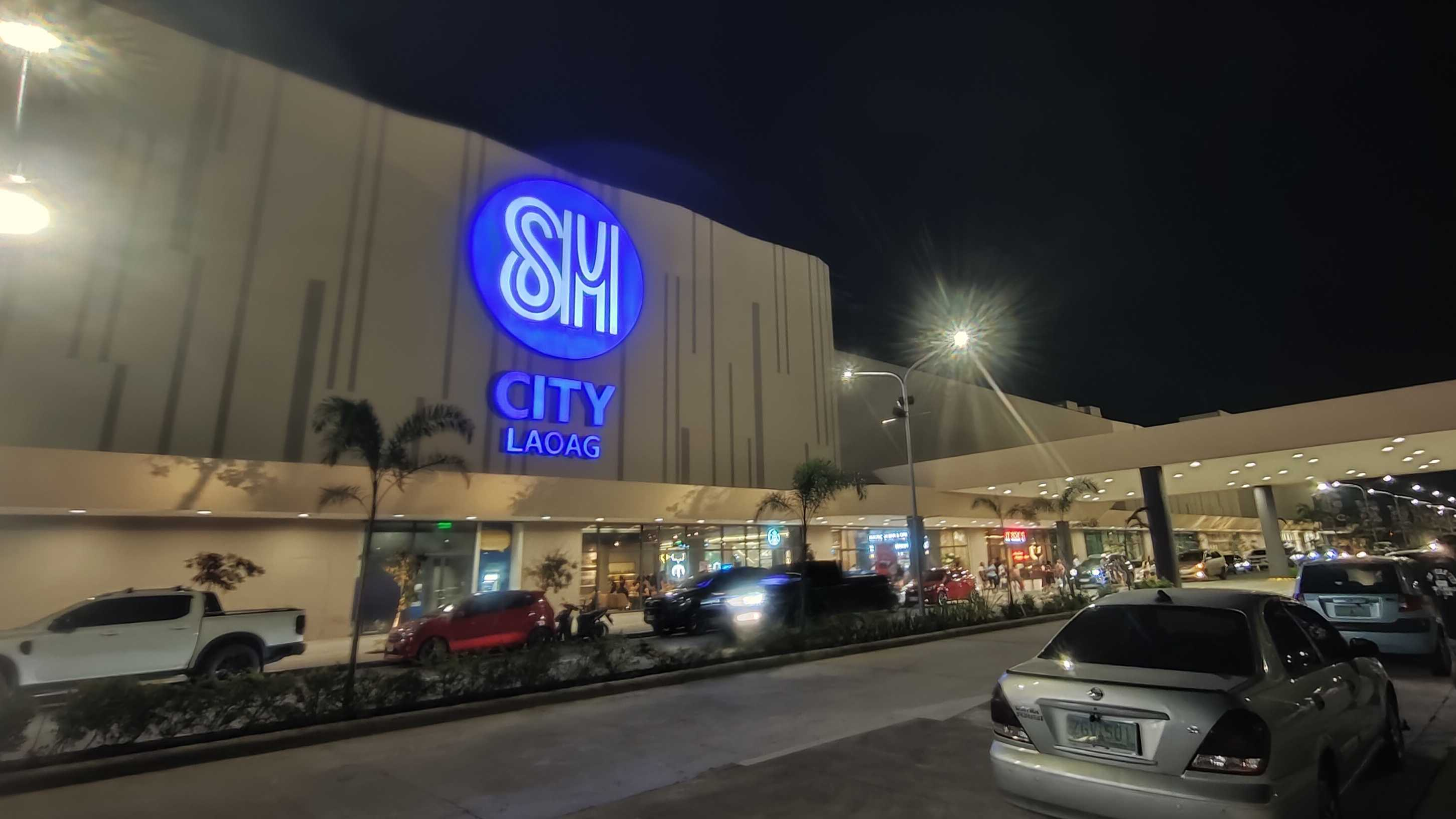
- The east façade of SM City Laoag since October 2025.
- Location: Laoag, Ilocos Norte, Philippines
- Coordinates: 18°11′17″N 120°35′09″E
- Address: Barangay 51-B, Airport Road
- Opened: May 30, 2025; 17 months ago
- Developer: SM Prime Holdings
- Manager: SM Prime Holdings
- Architect: Royal Pineda; Budji Layug
- Num. of stores: ~ 171
- Num. of anchor tenants: 9
- Floor area: 92,000 m^{2} (990,000 sq ft)
- Floors: 4: Second Level; Ground Level; Lower Ground Level; Roofdeck Parking
- Parking: 1,300+
- Website: Official website

SM City Laoag is a shopping mall located in Airport Road, Laoag, Philippines. It is the fourth SM Supermall and the largest in the Ilocos Region, the first in the province of Ilocos Norte, and the 88th in the Philippines. It is owned and operated by SM Prime Holdings. It has a total gross leasable area of 51,000 square meters and a total gross floor area of 92,000 square meters (1,220,000 sq feet).

== History ==
Media reports and social media posts about the proposed mall began circulating around 2010. In 2014, the project was publicly announced, with partial payments made to landowners.

Additionally, SM Prime began scouting the area shortly after the opening of Robinsons Ilocos, which opened in late 2009.

== Construction ==
Site clearing and the installment of blue fences, began on June 19, 2023, and construction began at the end of 2023. The mall was originally supposed to open on October 25, 2024, but was delayed for an unknown reason; however, tropical cyclones likely played a role. It was also supposed to open by Christmas 2024, but was again delayed without any stated reason.

The mall officially opened on May 30, 2025, following its soft opening and blessing on May 29, 2025, when most stores and services were already operational. During the soft opening, several establishments held their own inauguration ceremonies and programs.

== Mall features ==
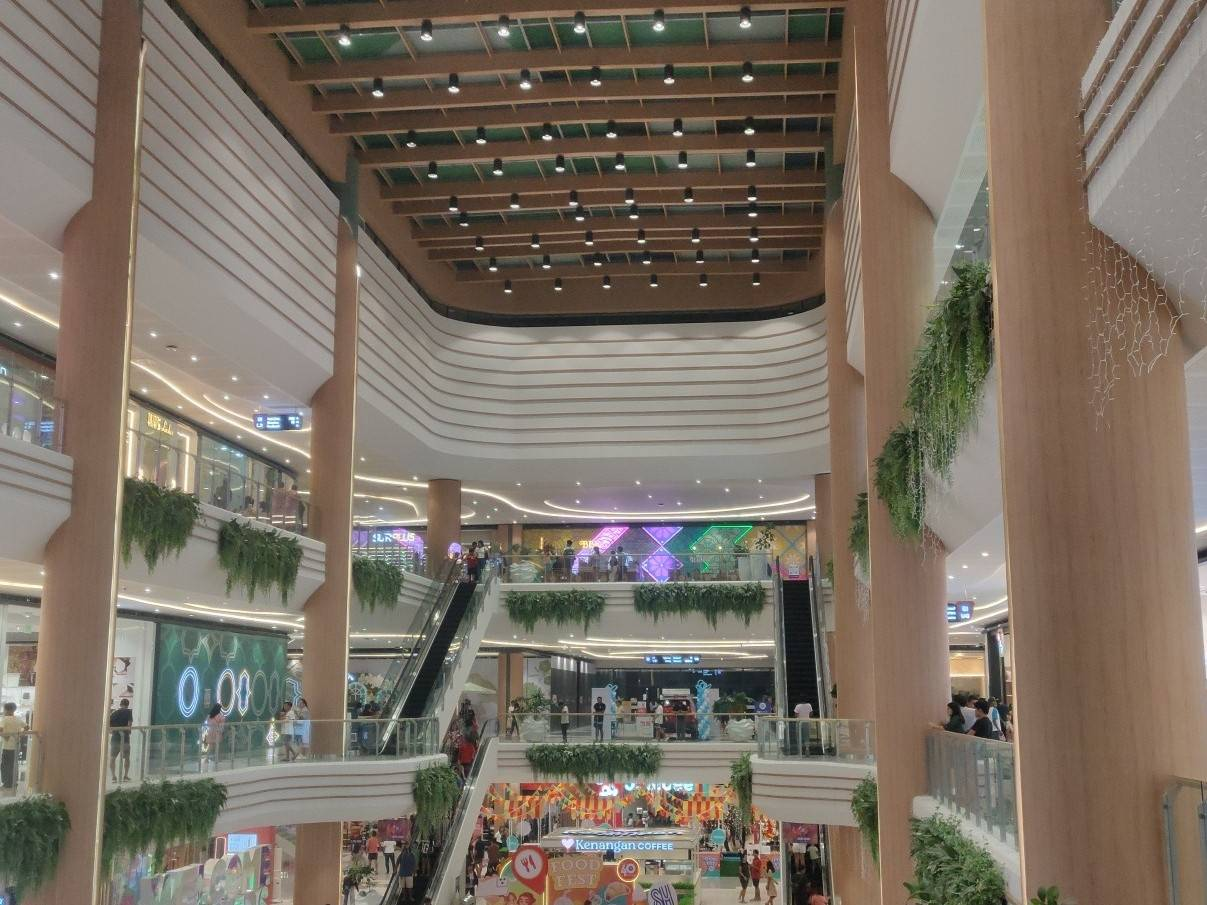
Mall atrium

SM Prime Holdings envisioned the 4-level mall as a new lifestyle landmark in the city. It features a biophilic design with indoor trees, and has three tall atriums for vertical expansion. The mall features three floors of retail spaces, a roof-deck parking area, and a transport terminal. SM Supermalls previously described the Laoag mall as being inspired by the city's “coastal desert.”

“Festive Ilocos’ first supermall inspired by Laoag's coastal desert, this mall celebrates local heritage and culture.” was stated on the SM Supermalls website.

SM City Laoag houses SM's anchor tenants, including SM Supermarket, SM Store, SM Cinema, and SM Appliance.

Located in the north wing is Dap-Ayan Park, a small recreational area that includes a paw park, playground, rock tower art, and decorative pinwheels. Sky Ranch remains in the planning stages. However, its construction has not been confirmed by SM themselves, but it is still possible. Additionally, the mall features a prominent LED billboard positioned at its front façade.

Dap-Ayan Park

Starbucks was the first store to open in the mall, on April 30, 2025, a month ahead of the mall's opening. J.CO Donuts & Coffee followed suit with an opening on May 24, 2025.

Other stores and services commonly found in SM malls—such as Burger King, Dairy Queen, and Krispy Kreme—were initially planned to open in the mall. However, these three establishments ultimately did not open, and several retail spaces remain vacant. While their opening now appears unlikely, the possibility has not been entirely ruled out.

A number of stores and services opened ahead of the mall's grand opening as well, offering free items such as food to visitors.

=== Parking ===
The mall offers over 1,300 parking slots across three parking areas: the largest is the rooftop parking lot, followed by the west wing lot, and the smallest, the east wing lot. When these parking areas reach full capacity, especially when the mall first opened, or other special occasions, vehicles often resort to on-street parking along the mall's internal roads, made possible by their considerable width. However, mall guards will sometimes restrict on-street parking depending on traffic volume.

The mall also has two bicycle racks on the west and east sides, both equipped with repair stands.

=== Food Court ===
The food court at SM City Laoag is designed to offer a diverse and culturally inspired dining experience. Located at the second level, it features a biophilic design with diverse culinary options. The food court incorporates curvilinear design elements that mimic the natural contours of the nearby La Paz Sand Dunes, a significant local landmark. This design approach creates a fluid and organic ambiance within the dining area.

=== Cinemas ===
SM City Laoag hosts four regular cinemas and two Director's Club cinemas with plush leather recliner seats, an exclusive food menu, and in-house butler service. The Director's Club uses Dolby Atmos for the cinema's sound systems.

== Access ==
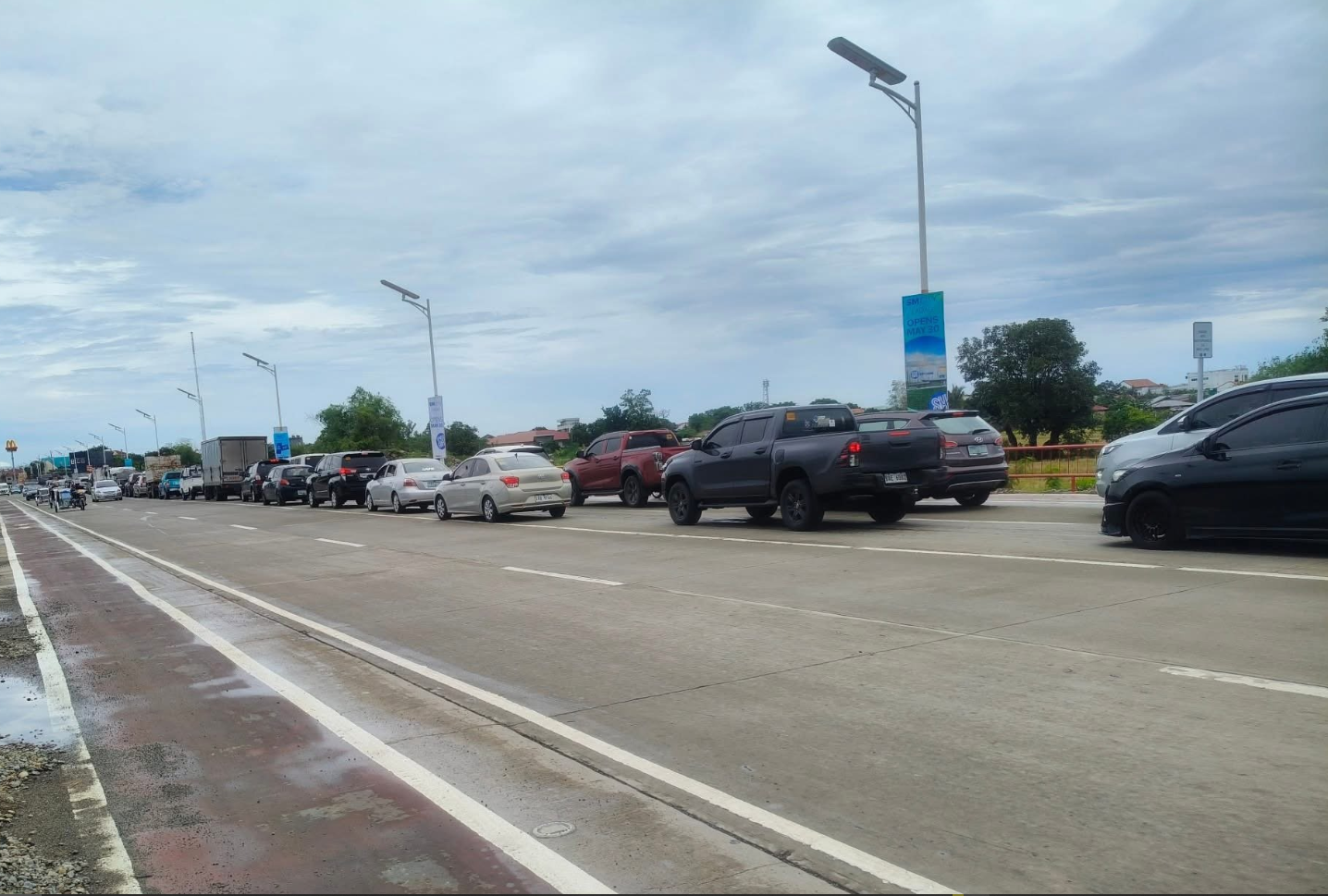
Traffic congestion at Rodolfo G. Fariñas Jr. Bypass Road on May 30, 2025, the day of the mall's grand opening.

The mall can be accessed through Airport Road, which serves as its primary entrance.

An access road project from Gilbert Bridge was completed in December 2025, providing faster access to the mall, with a possible extension to Barangay Tangid. However, it is currently operating on a dry-run basis, according to the city mayor.

== Events ==
May 25, 2025: The mall's east parking lot was used as a 3x3 basketball court for the 2025 Panlarong Pambansa.

May 30, 2025: The mall's sky fest event was postponed due to weather issues, and scheduled to May 31, 2025. It featured a kite show, mini hot air balloons, and a grand firework show.

== Gallery ==
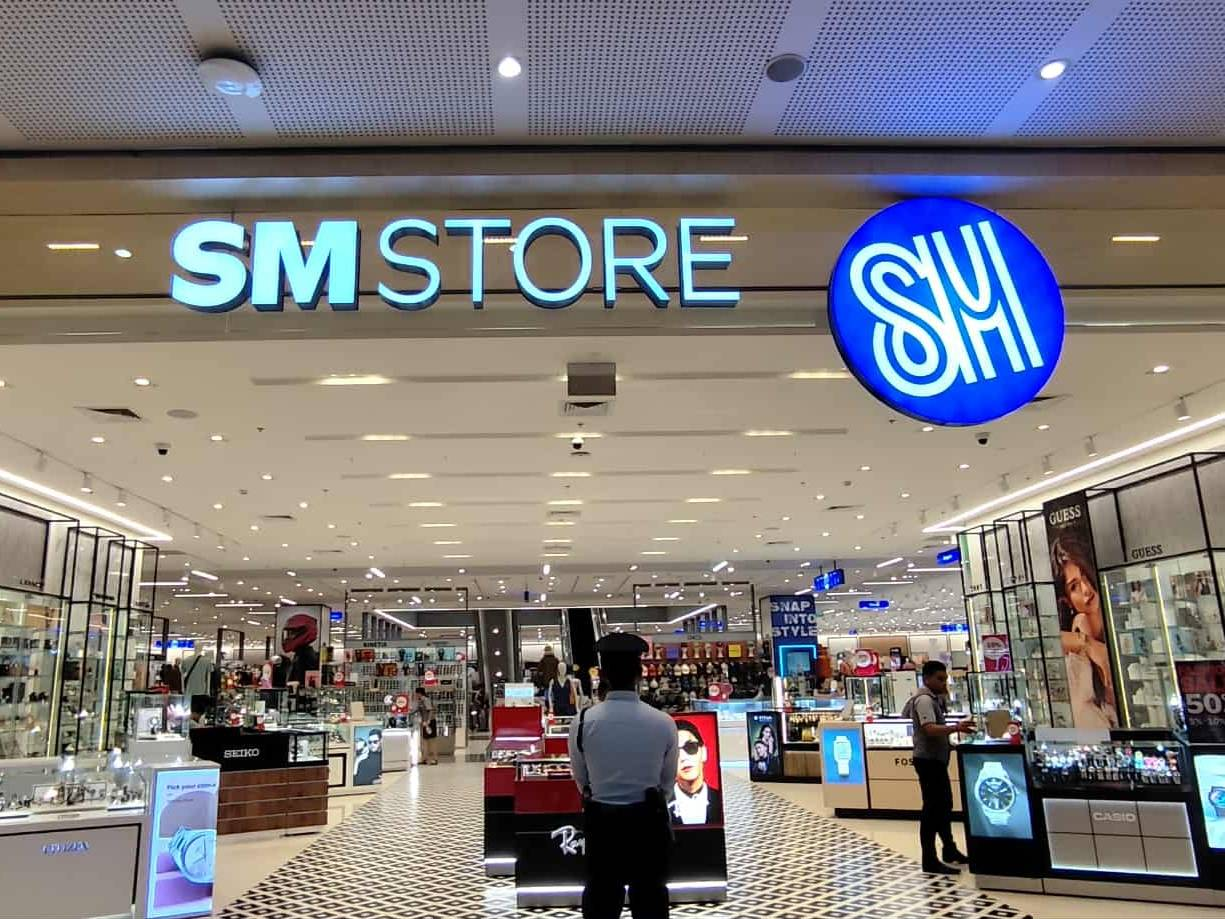
SM Store

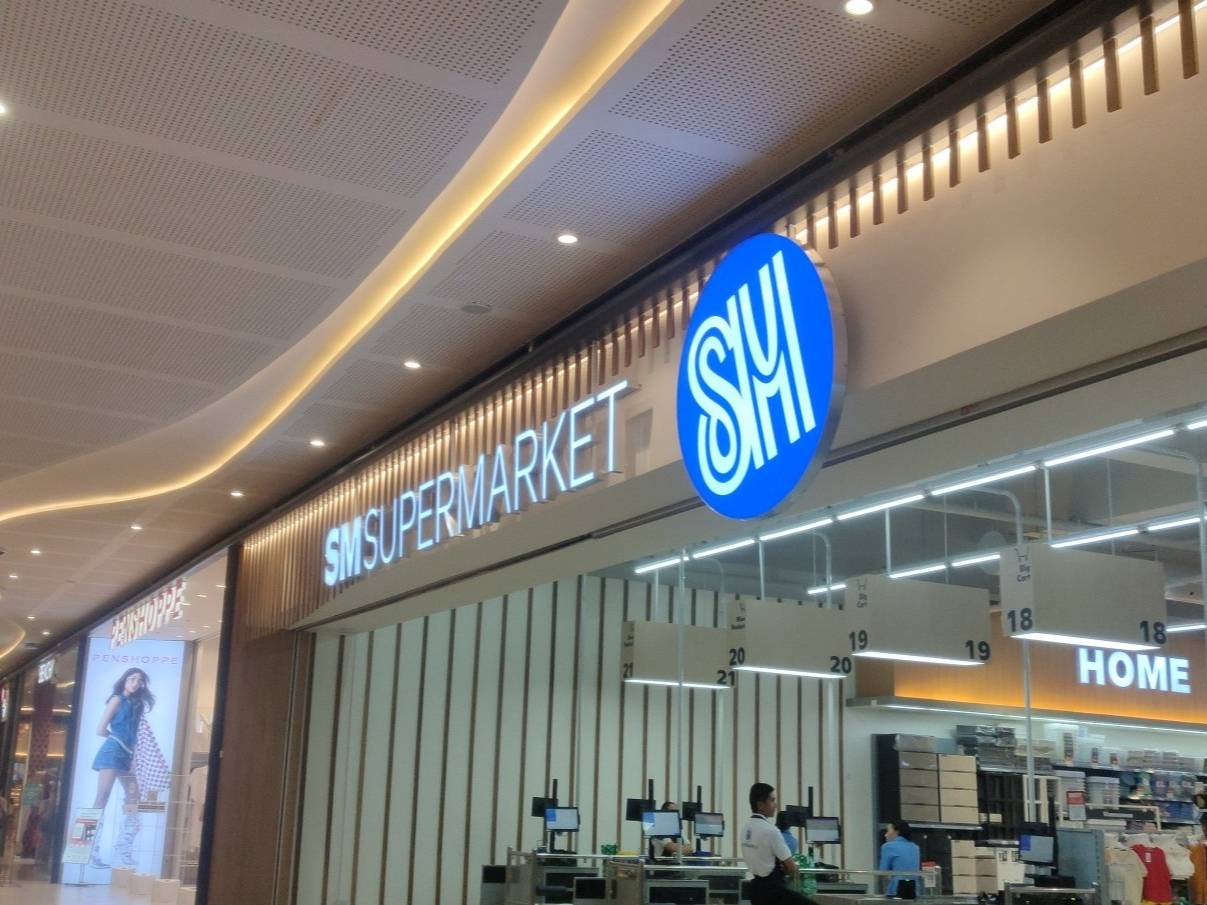
SM Supermarket

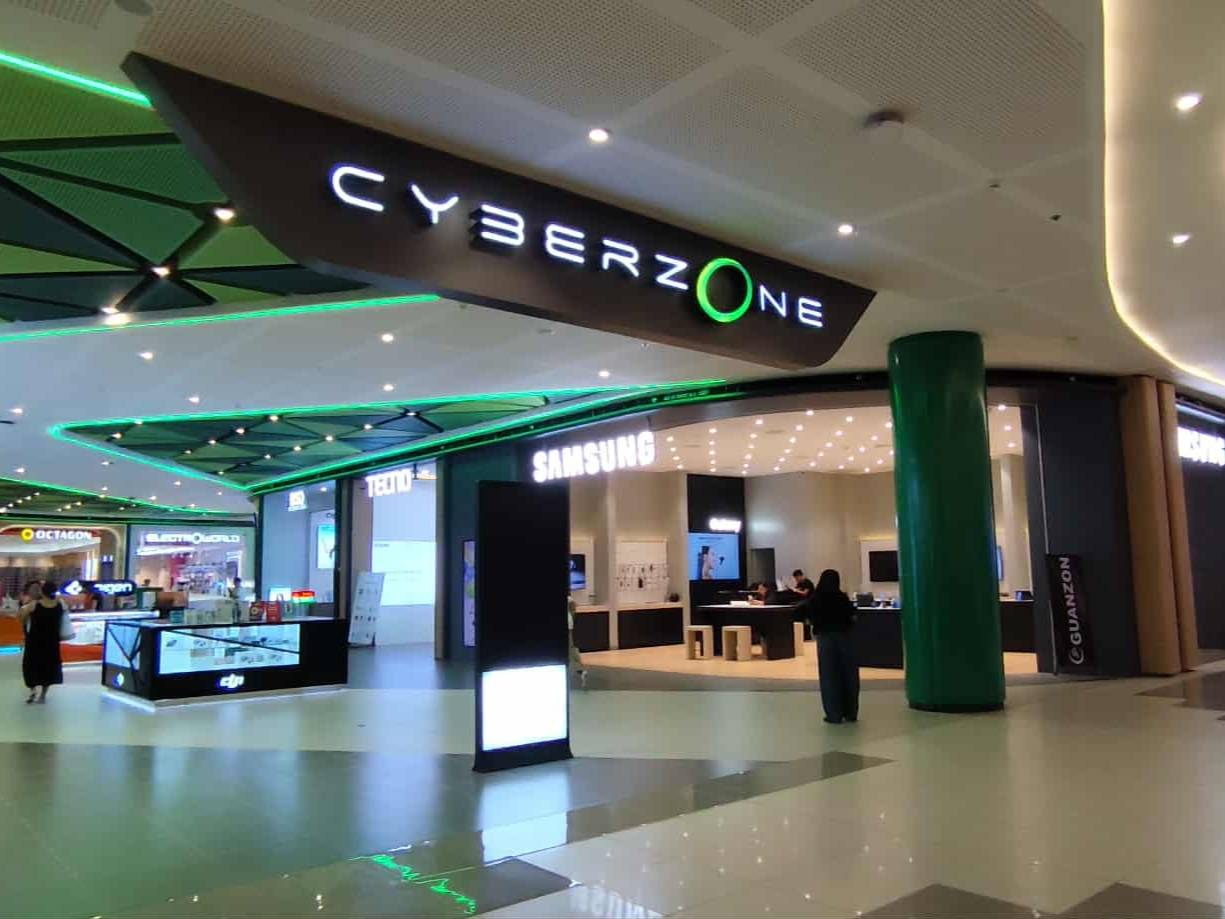
Cyberzone

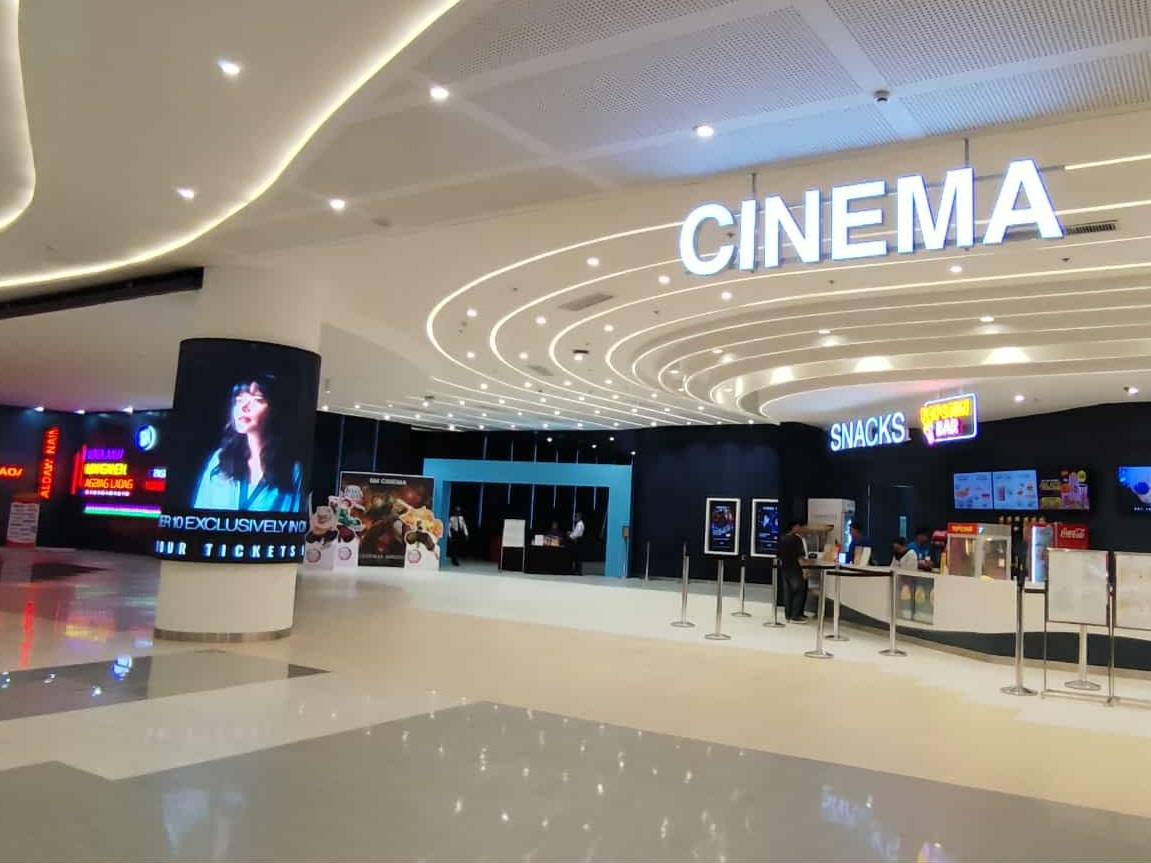
SM Cinema

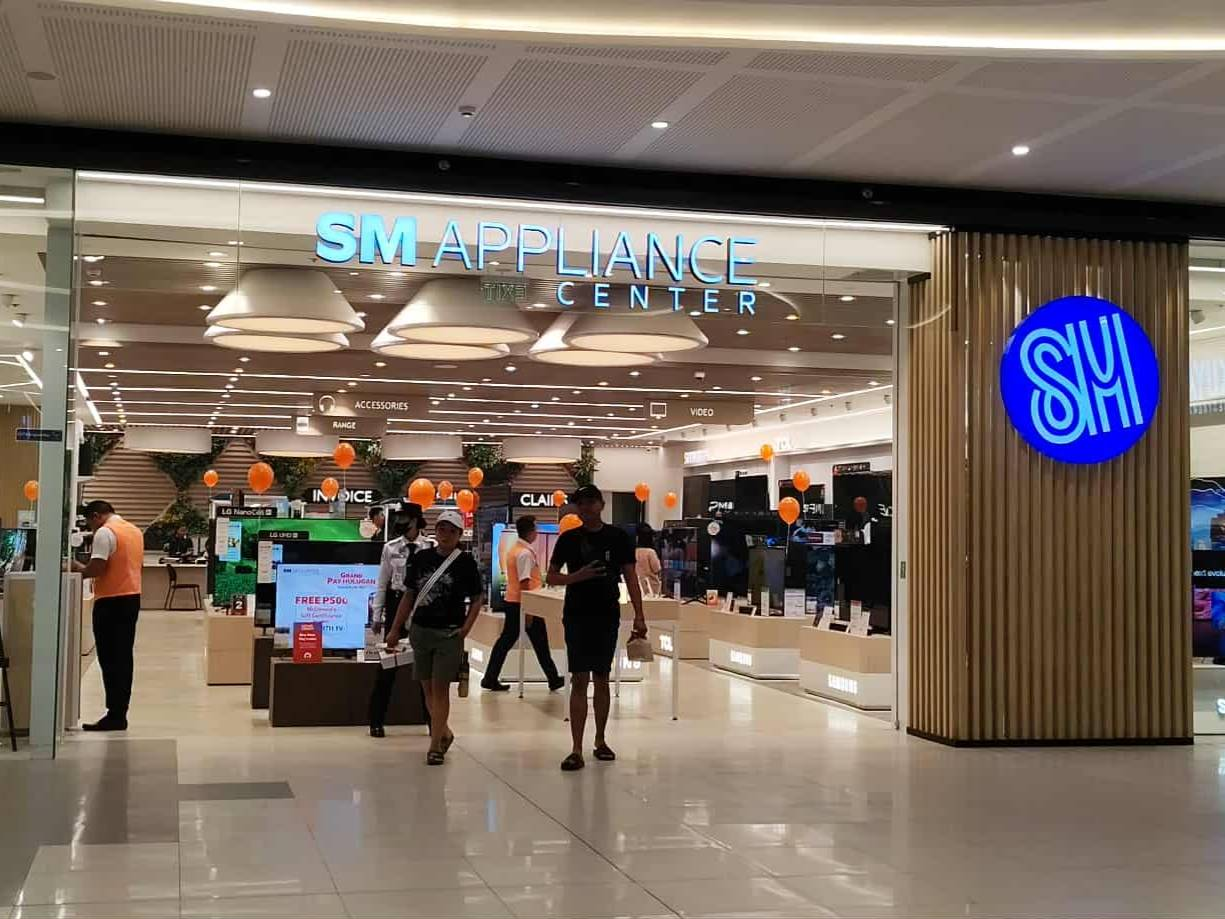
SM Appliance Center

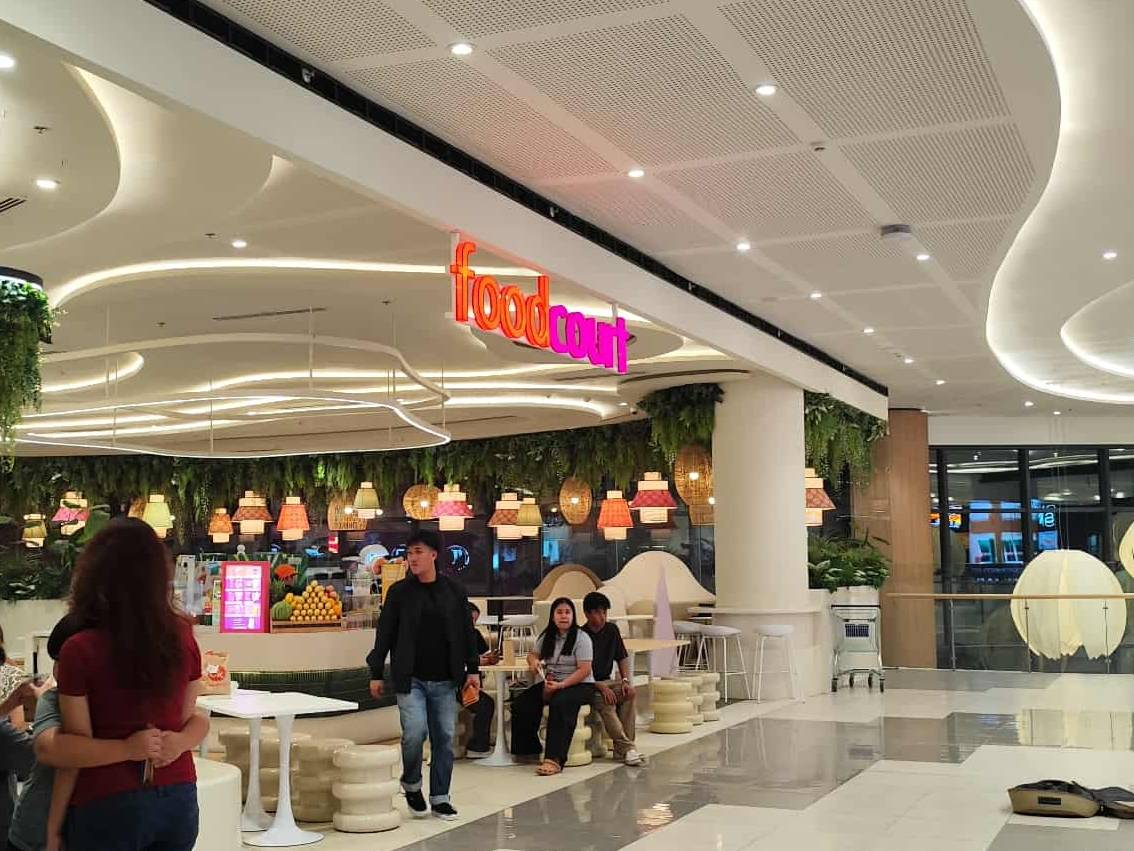
Food Court

== See also ==
- SM Supermalls
- SM City La Union

Preceded by SM J Mall	88th SM Supermall; 2025	Succeeded by SM City La Union
