= SM Center Ormoc =

Shopping mall in Ormoc, Leyte, Philippines

- Location: Ormoc, Philippines
- Coordinates: 11°00′39″N 124°36′27″E
- Opened: November 16, 2018; 7 years ago
- Owner: SM Prime
- Floor area: 20,000 square meters
- Floors: 2

SM Center Ormoc is a mall located in Ormoc City in the Philippines. After SM Prime built houses in Ormoc, construction started for two to three years. The mall opened on November 16, 2018. The mall takes part in many events, most of them related to the environment. Many designs related to the Anilao River, a river behind the mall were designed in the mall. Many shops are present in the mall, including international stores. There is a food court with many cuisines. The mall also contains high-quality cinemas, with a total of 390 seats excluding the director's club.

== History ==
=== Background and opening ===
SM built 200 houses in Ormoc for victims of Typhoon Haiyan in 2015. That same year, the SM company planned to create a mall in Ormoc after buying plots of land in the city. The vice president of the company, Marissa Fernan, told The Philippine Star that they would be done in two to three years. The next year, project managers started planning for the development of the mall. By the later months of 2018, the mall was already finished. By October, the opening date was scheduled to be in the fourth quarter. The mall opened to consumers on November 16, 2018, just before Christmas. The mall is the 72nd of SM Prime, the 7th in the Visayas archipelago, and the first in Eastern Visayas. During the opening, 85 percent of the space lease was already awarded. The mall has Hermosilla Drive in the north, Real Street, the main street of Ormoc in the east, Osmeña Street in the south, and Anilao River in the west.

=== Further history ===
The mall took part in Super Kids Day, a day where children are accommodated in the SM malls, along with 65 other locations, on October 1, 2019. After the opening, the mall had numerous events, including an art exhibition about the sustainability of the environment, where many local artists created art pieces out of everyday materials in 2023. When fires hit in Lake Danao, Leyte, that same year, the mall activated assistance operations to the lake, giving assistance to 70 families affected by the fire. Two years later, the mall launched Earth Day Ormoc 2025, an event with local organizations and schools participating. The event finished with a light switch-off on March 22.

== Architecture and description ==
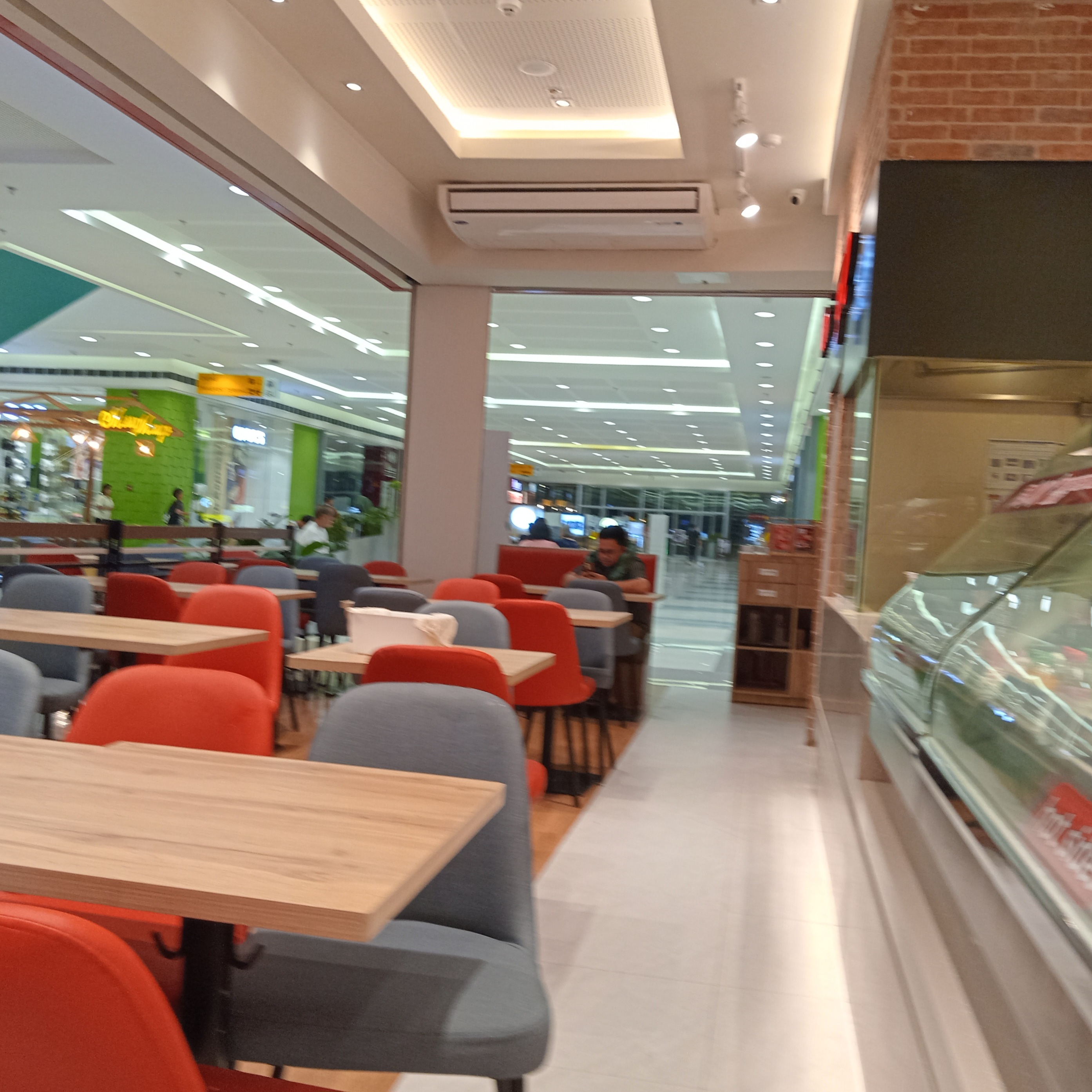
Image of the mall inside a Kenny Rogers Roasters store in the first floor.

The mall was built in a 15,782-square-meter (169,880 sq ft) site. It has two floors. The design during the opening showed shades of green and designs of the Anilao River, a river which flows behind the complex. According to Philippines Graphic, the designs were described as "vibrant and serene". In the front entry, a wide star was placed, covered by a canopy. The interior of the mall shows an L-shaped atrium, with a Clerestory at the second floor, providing light to the bottom. According to Mall Stores Directory, the mall was "well-organized" and "accessible". There were clear walkways for persons with disabilities.

== Features ==
=== Shops and stores ===
The mall contains many SM-based shops, with the biggest being the SM Hypermarket. Other SM-related stores in the mall are Banco de Oro, SM Appliance Center, Ace Hardware, Watsons, Sport Central, and more. Many international food chains are in the mall, but some local and domestic food chains also have spots in the mall, including Mayong's and other stores. The mall also has three digital cinemas.

According to their website, they have multiple technology stores including stores from Aerophone, Realme, Samsung, Smart Communications, and Vivo. The mall also has children's parks for entertainment. They also have slots for LBC Express, the National Book Store, Ace Hardware, a Mitsubishi store, many stores for shopping, including slots for Crocs and MINISO, and a few salons. According to Mall Stores Directory, the store had a food court with multiple cuisines. There were multiple stores with Filipino culture and local artisan artists. The website also stated that the customer service was good there. There was easy transportation coming to and from the mall. The directory elaborated that there were clean restrooms, and many seats scattered across the mall.

=== Cinemas and transportation ===
According to Pelikula Mania, the cinemas are Surround sound, with comfortable seats. Other than the three cinemas, another cinema is director's club, with 40 electronic reclining seats. The director's club cinema has special butlers. For the normal cinemas, Cinema 1 and Cinema 2 has 118 seats, while Cinema 3 has 114. The total seats of all the normal cinemas are 390 seats. The mall has available parking in three levels, with 426 parking spots for cars, eight for persons with disabilities, and 133 slots for motorcycles. 12 terminal slots are also on the ground floor.
