= SM City Chengdu =

SM Chengdu
- Location: Chengdu, Sichuan, China
- Coordinates: 30°40′16″N 104°06′36″E
- Address: NO.29, Section 2 of 2nd Ring Road
- Opened: October 20, 2006; 20 years ago
- Owner: SM Prime Holdings
- Floor area: 176,000 m^{2} (1,890,000 sq ft)
- Website: www.smprime.com/smprime/index.php?p=671&mall=36

This is the SM Supermalls logo. You can note the “SM” in the circle.

SM Chengdu is a shopping mall in Chenghua District, Chengdu, Sichuan province, China. It is owned and operated by SM Prime Holdings.

== See also ==
- SM Prime
- Other SM Malls in China
  - SM City Jinjiang
  - SM City Xiamen
  - SM Lifestyle Center
