= SM Lifestyle Center =

Shopping mall in Xiamen, Fujian, China

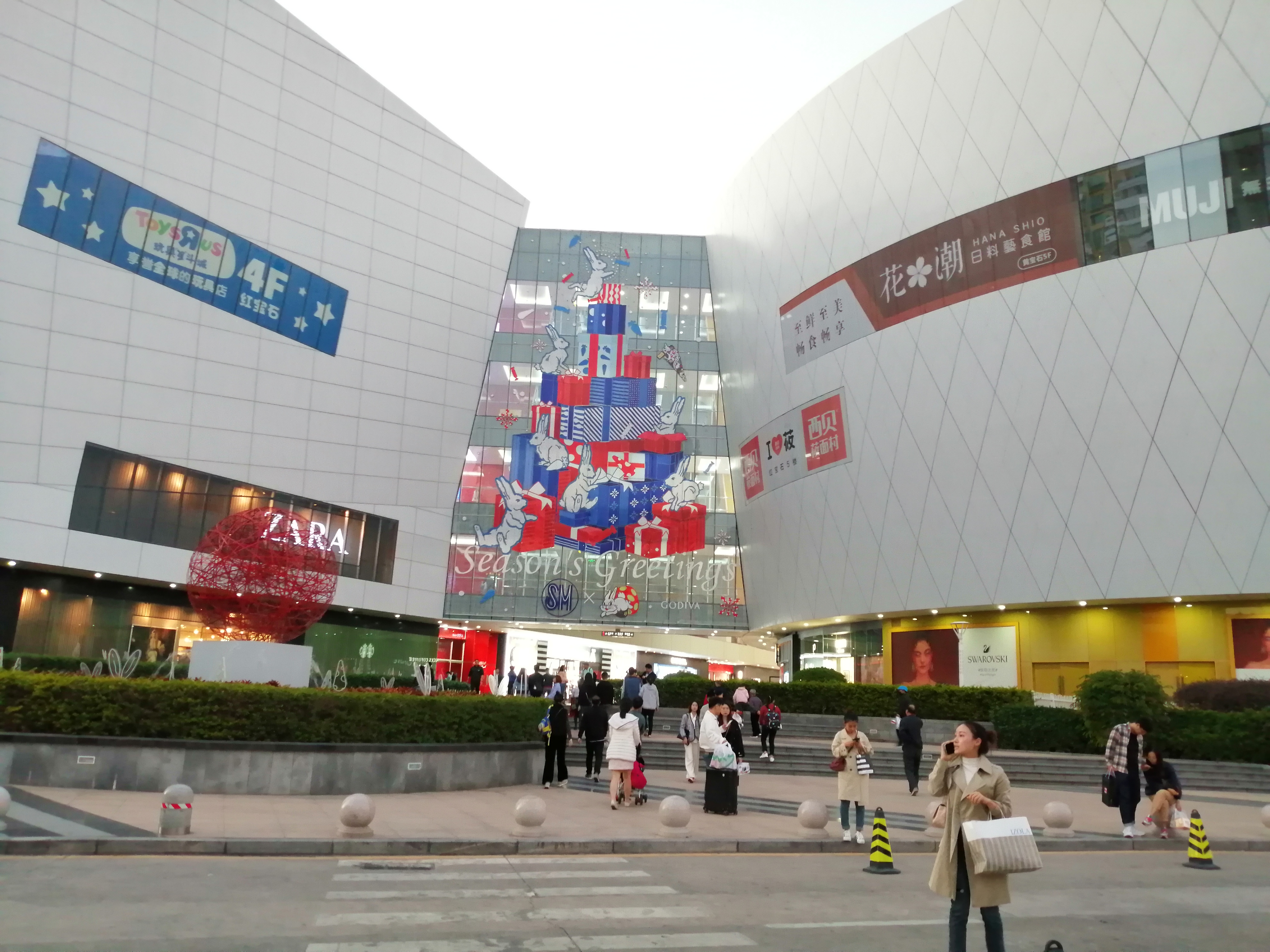
- Location: Xiamen, Fujian, China
- Coordinates: 24.502042°N 118.120422°E
- Opened: October 30, 2009; 17 years ago
- Owner: SM Prime Holdings
- Floor area: 109,947 m^{2} (1,183,460 sq ft)
- Website: SM Prime Holdings

SM Lifestyle Center is a shopping mall in Xiamen, Fujian, China. Sitting across the road from SM Xiamen in Huli District, SM Lifestyle Center consists of three different theme buildings. One of the first shopping centers in Xiamen to introduce the idea of "lifestyle mall", it is owned and operated by SM Prime Holdings and is their second shopping mall in Xiamen and their 4th mall expansion in China, with 216,000 m^{2} (2,330,000 sq ft) retail space. It is managed by Henry Sy, a Filipino-Chinese businessman.

== Public transportation ==
SM Lifestyle Center is accessible from Xiamen Metro's line 1 Wushipu 乌石浦 station. SM Lifestyle Center is also connected to SM Xiamen via an overhead pedestrian bridge.

== See also ==
- SM Prime Holdings
- Other SM Malls in China
  - SM City Jinjiang
  - SM City Chengdu
