= SM City Jinjiang =

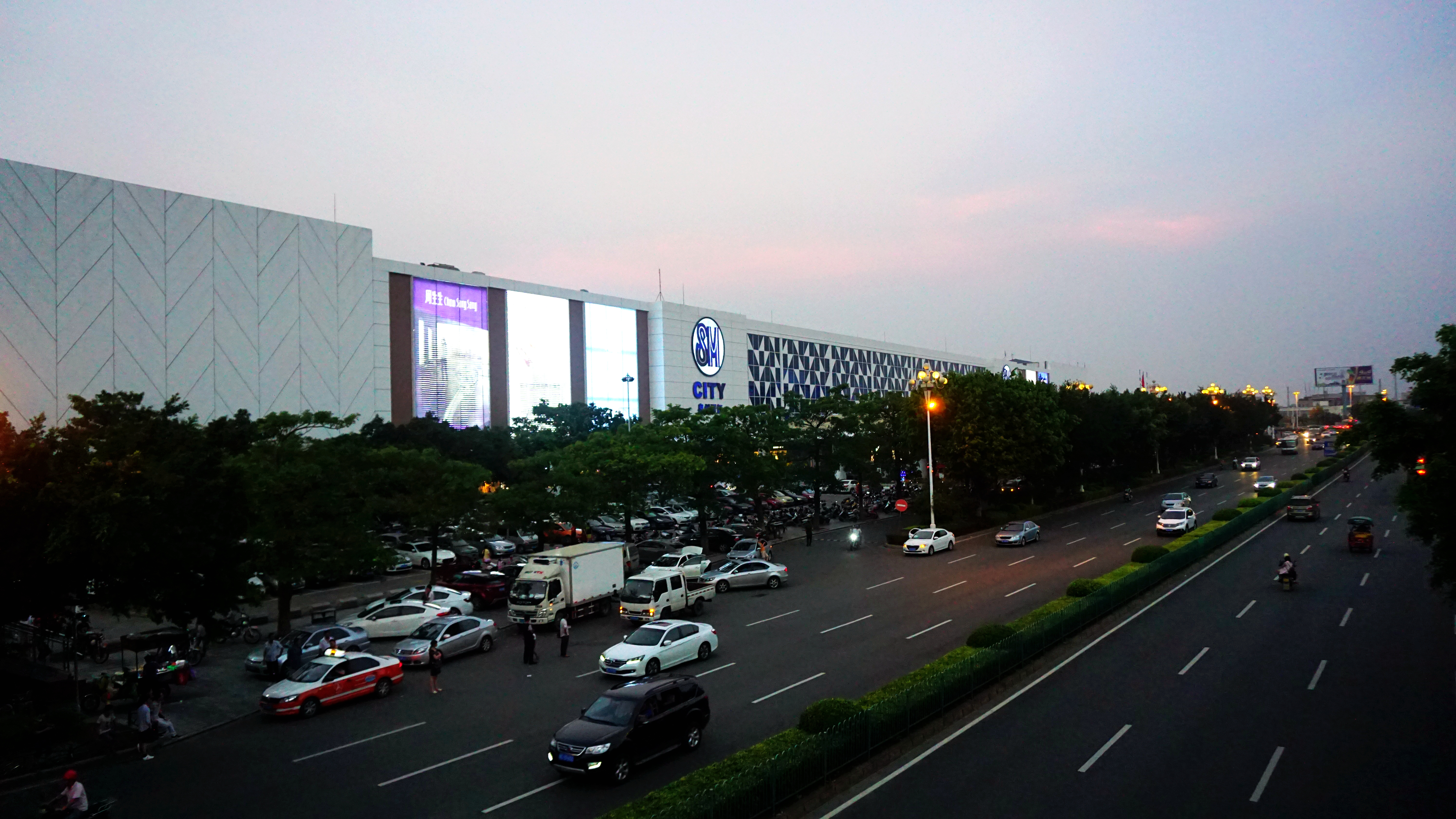
- SM City Jinjiang exterior in 2016
- Location: Fu PU SM International Square, Jinjiang, Fujian, China
- Coordinates: 24°46′51″N 118°33′36″E
- Opened: November 26, 2005; 20 years ago
- Owner: SM Prime Holdings
- Floor area: 170,000 m^{2} (1,800,000 sq ft)
- Website: SM Prime

SM City Jinjiang (Chinese: 泉州晋江SM国际广场) is a mall in Jinjiang, Fujian, China, as part of expansion of SM Prime Holdings Philippines. It is owned and operated by SM Prime Holdings. Its exterior is similar to the old exterior of SM North EDSA in the Philippines.

== See also ==
Other SM Malls in China

- SM City Chengdu
  - SM City Xiamen
  - SM Lifestyle Center
