= SM Xiamen =

Shopping mall in Xiamen, Fujian, China

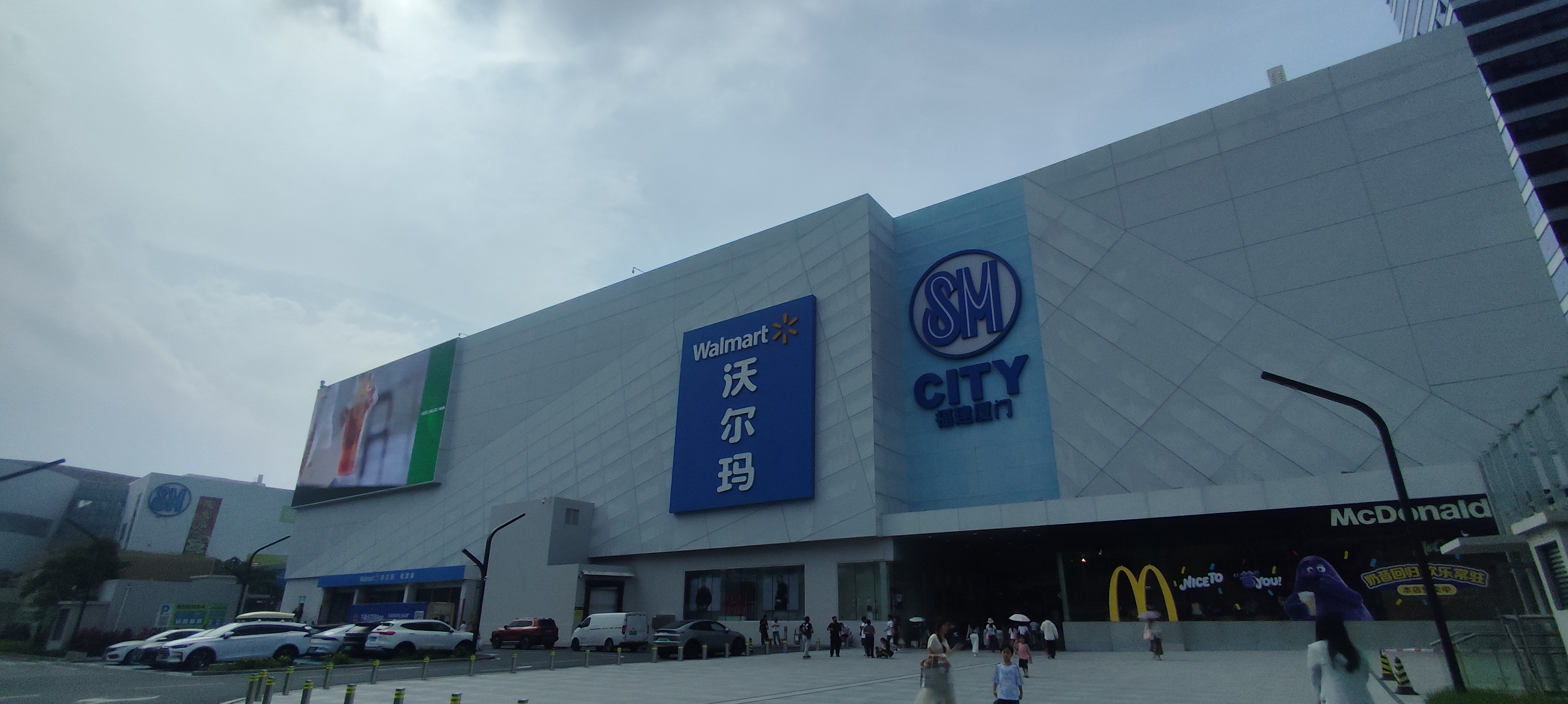
- SM Xiamen in 2026
- Location: Jiahe Road-Xianyue Road, Huli, Xiamen, Fujian, China
- Coordinates: 24°30′13″N 118°07′21″E
- Opened: December 13, 2001; 24 years ago
- Developer: SM Prime Holdings
- Num. of stores: 500+
- Floor area: 126,000 m^{2} (1,360,000 sq ft)
- Floors: 5
- Parking: 1,100 cars (open car park)
- Website: www.smsupermalls.cn/city/m/index.aspx

SM Xiamen (Chinese: 厦门SM城市广场; pinyin: Xiàmén SM Chéngshì Guǎngchǎng) is a shopping centre in Xiamen, Fujian, China. It is owned by SM Prime Holdings, the largest retail and mall operator in the Philippines. Opened on 13 December 2001, it is the first SM Supermall in mainland China.

In Xiamen, it is aptly called "SM Laiya". The mall has a gross floor area of 126,000 m^{2} (1,360,000 sq ft) with over 500 shops featuring local and international brands. It is located along Jiahe and Xianyue Roads.

== See also ==
- SM Lifestyle Center

Preceded by None	1st SM Supermall in China; 2001	Succeeded by SM City Jinjiang
