= List of islands of Zamboanga City =

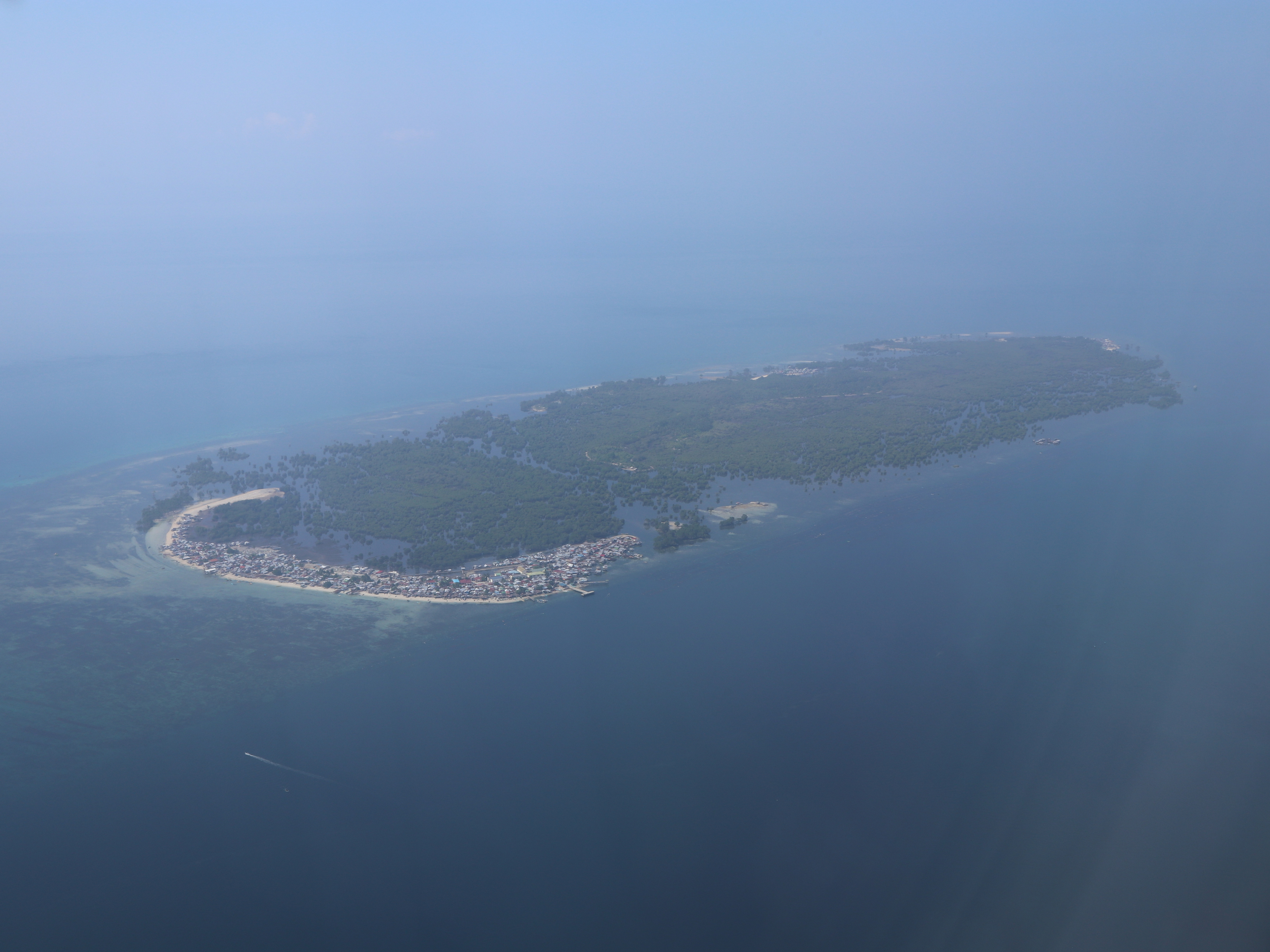
Tictabon Island

Zamboanga City in the Philippines contains 28 islands off the mainland coast. The largest is Sacol (about 12 km long and 8 km wide). Three of them, (Vitali, Malanipa, and Sacol) are inhabited mostly by fishing residents and have their own barangays. The others are not regularly inhabited, but frequented by fishermen and scuba divers. A group of 11 Islands located on the Moro Gulf coast are known collectively as the Eleven Islands, Cabugan Island (approx. 11 hectares) is the largest of them.

The most popular islands among both tourists and local residents are the Great and Little Santa Cruz Islands, known for pink coral sands, and rich in coral, shell varieties. , and sea life.

The islands are:

- Bacungan Island
- Baong Island
- Bobo Island
- Buguias Island
- Cabog Island
- Camugan Island
- Gatusan Island
- Great Santa Cruz Island
- Kablingan Island
- Lambang Island
- Lamunigan Island
- Lapinigan Island
- Little Malanipa Island
- Little Santa Cruz Island
- Malanipa Island
- Panganaban Island
- Pangapuyan Island
- Pitas Island
- Sacol Island
- Salangan Island
- Sinunug Island
- Taguiti Island
- Tictabon Island
- Tigburacao Island
- Tumalutap Island
- Vilan Vilan Island
- Visa Island
- Vitali Island
