= Vitali Island =

Island in the Philippines

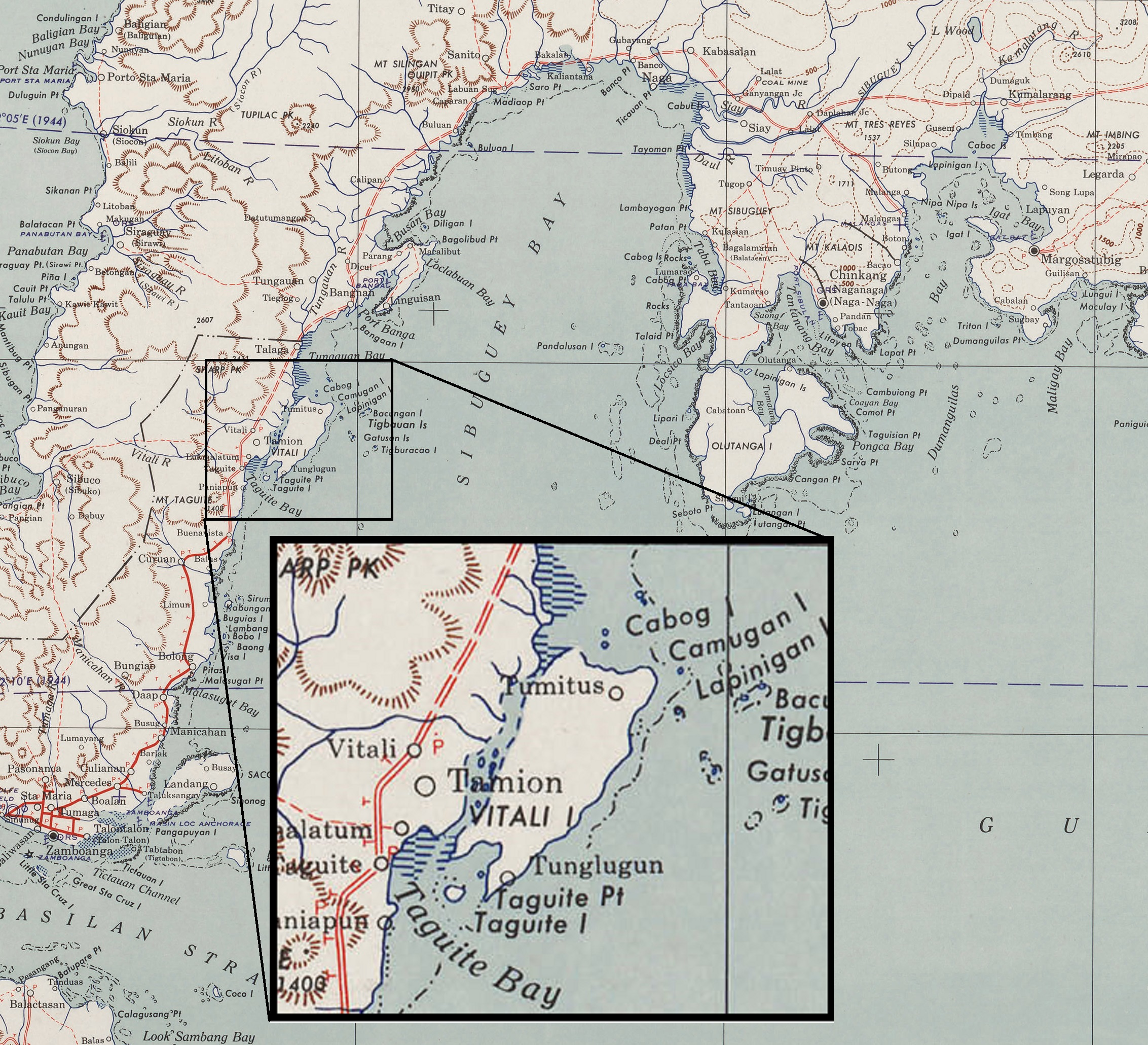
- Excerpt of 1944 map showing Vitali Island off coast of Zamboanga peninsula
- Interactive map of Vitali Island

Geography
- Coordinates: 7°21′31″N 122°20′54″E
- Length: 11.8 km (7.33 mi)
- Width: 5 km (3.1 mi)

Administration
- Philippines
- Region: Region IX
- City: Zamboanga City
- Barangay: Limaong; Tumitus

Additional information
- Time zone: PST (UTC+8)

Vitali Island (also called Limaong Island) is the largest of the 28 offshore islands that are part of the city of Zamboanga in the Republic of the Philippines.

It is between 10,000 and 12,000 acres (40 and 49 km^{2}) and is located opposite the mouth of the Vitali River.

== Geography ==
The island is located on the Moro Gulf about 56 kilometres (35 mi) NNE of the city downtown, 7 kilometres (4.3 mi) from the border of the province of Zamboanga del Sur, and 1.5 kilometres (0.93 mi) east of the mainland Barangay of Mangusu of Zamboanga City. At its longest, the island is about 11.8 kilometres (7.3 mi) long, and at its widest, about 5 kilometres (3.1 mi).

The coast line is mainly rocky cliffs, with elevation ranging from 20 to 200 feet (6.1 to 61.0 m) above mean sea level, averaging out at roughly 50 feet (15 m).

The mangrove in eastern Vitali is a protected area.

A single bridge connects the island to the mainland. The former wooden bridge was replaced with a new bridge by 2017.

== Demographics ==
The majority of the population is Muslim. Especially from the Sama people who speak the Sibuco-Vitali Sama, then there are also people from the Tausug and Yakan peoples. There are also Christian settlers from other areas of the Zamboanga Peninsula, from the Subanon and other ethnicities, such as the Cebuano and Hiligaynon peoples.

== Barangays ==
The island is made up of two barangays: Their combined population per the 2020 census is 7,497.

- Limaong
- Tumitus

== Economy ==
Fishing serves as a significant source of livelihood for residents of the island.

== See also ==
- List of islands of Zamboanga City
- List of islands of the Philippines
