= Zamboanga City =

Highly-urbanized city in Zamboanga Peninsula, Philippines

Zamboanga City Ciudad de Zamboanga (Chavacano)
- Highly urbanized city
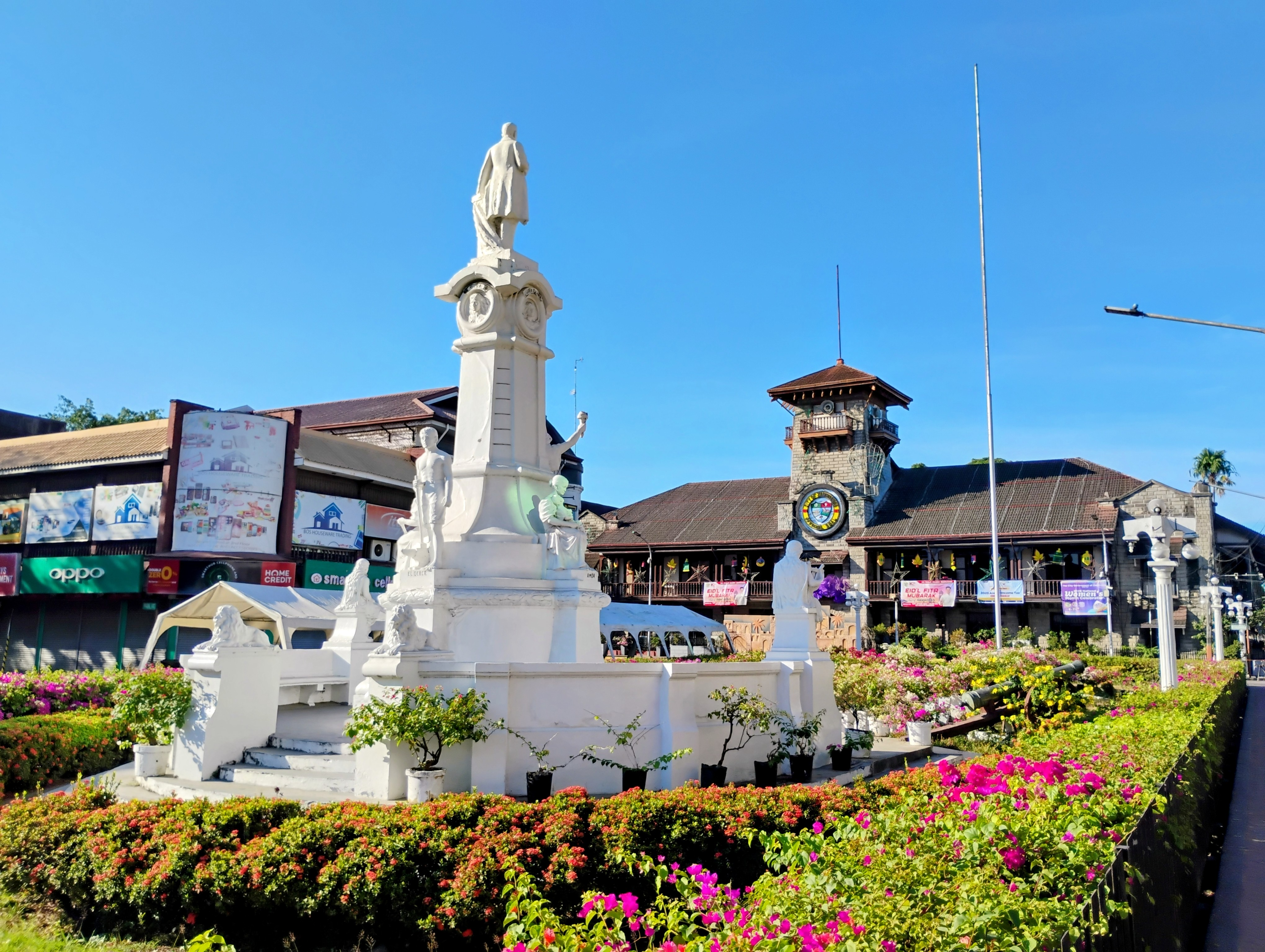
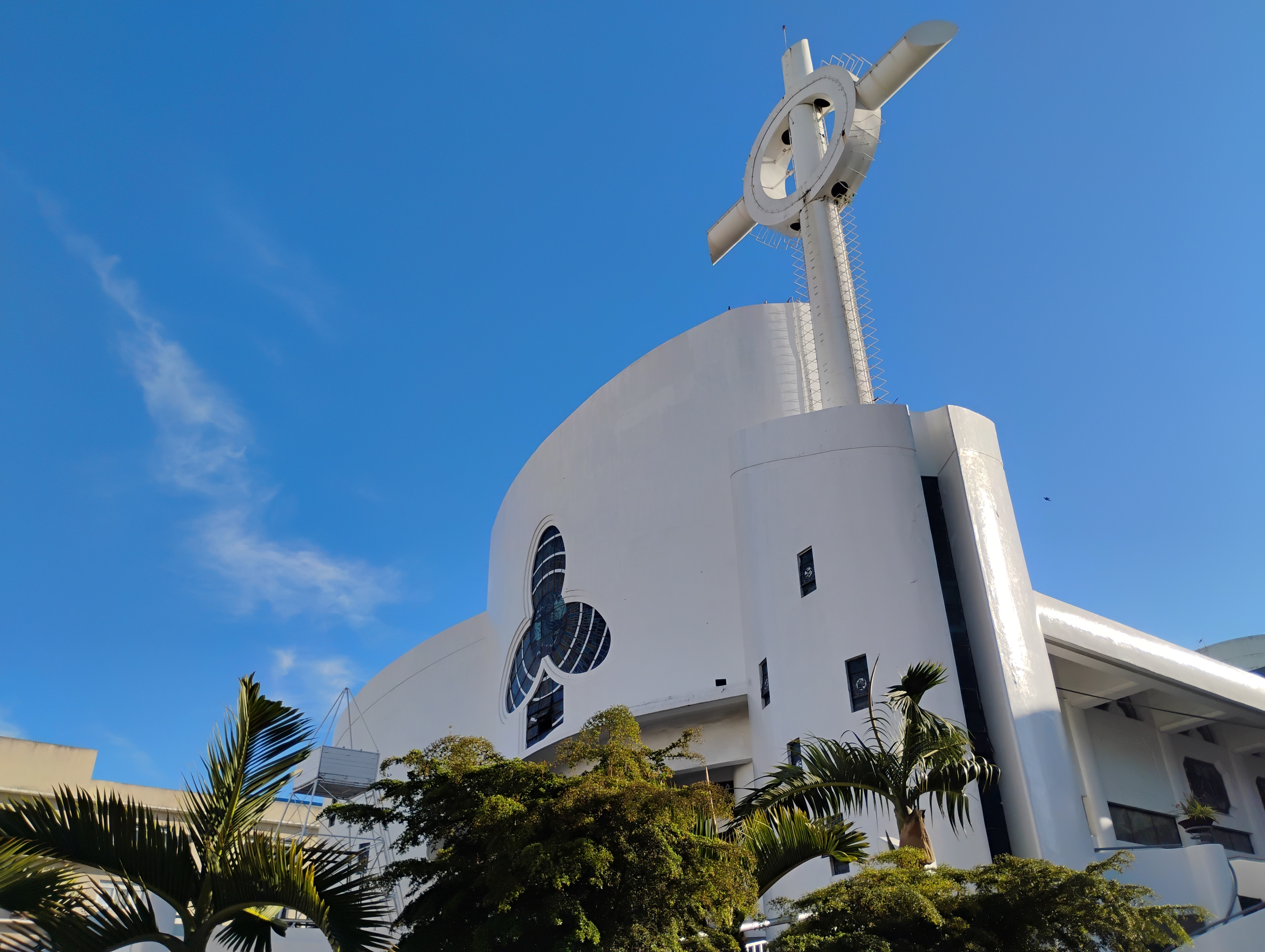
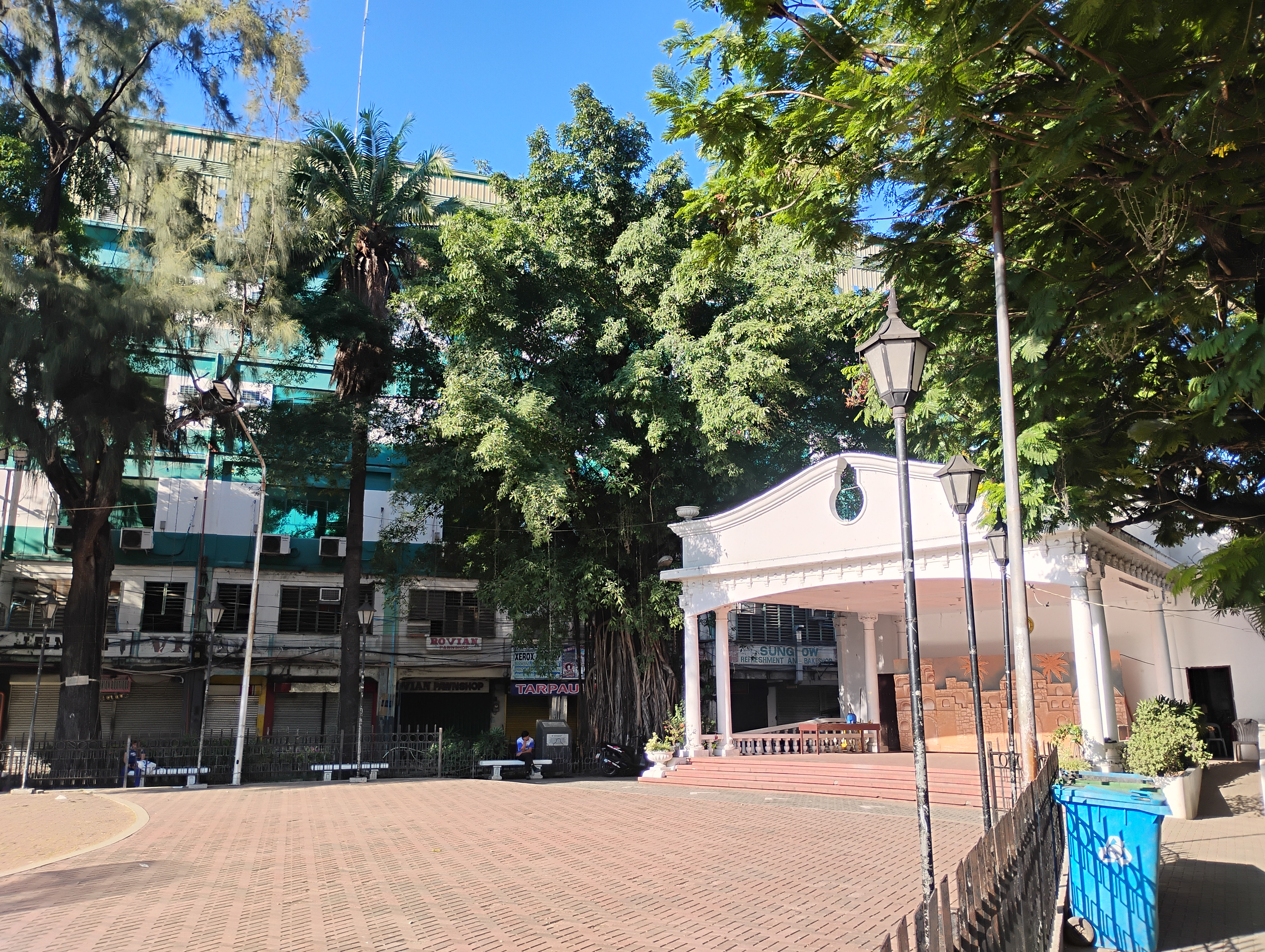
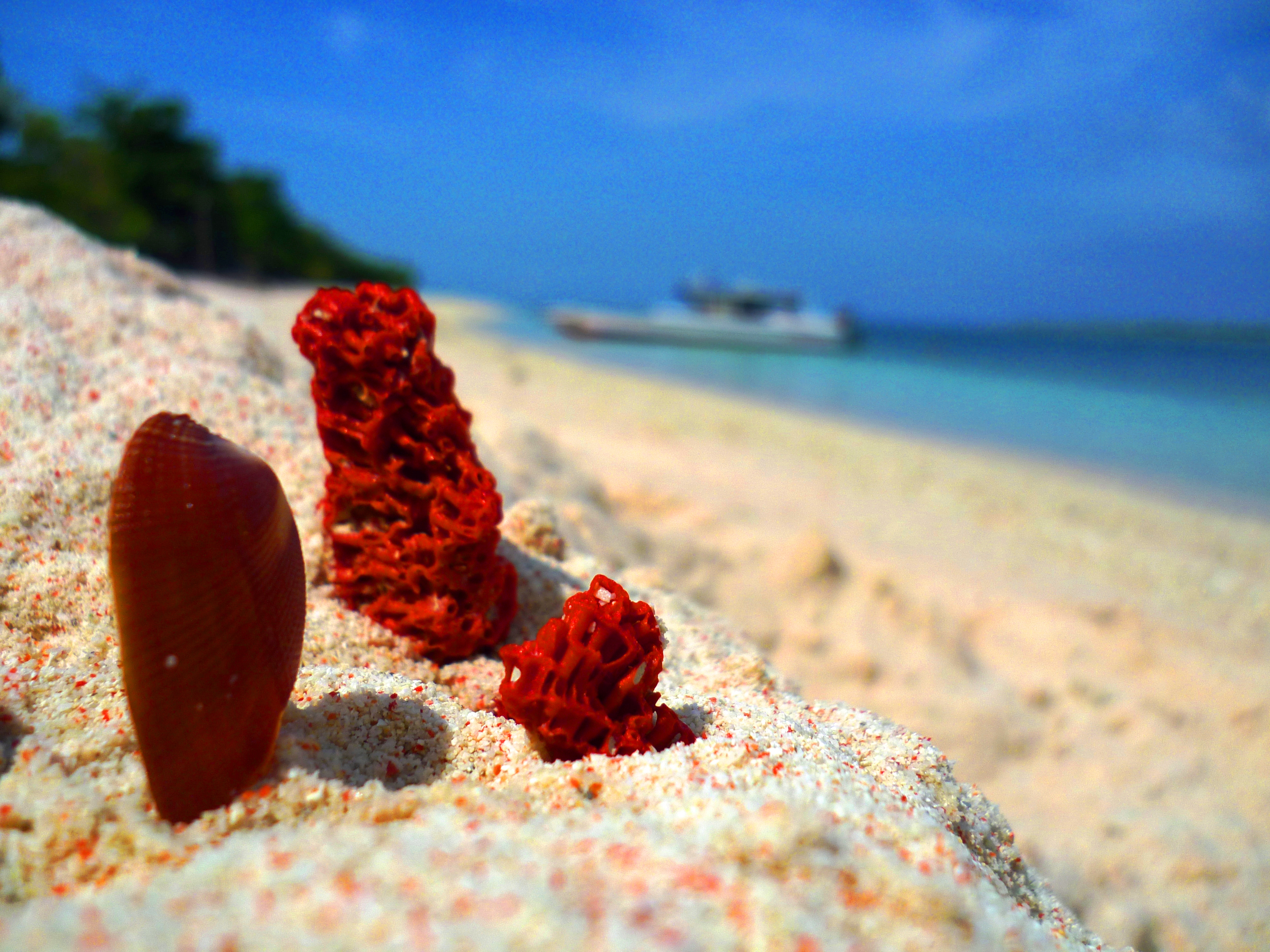
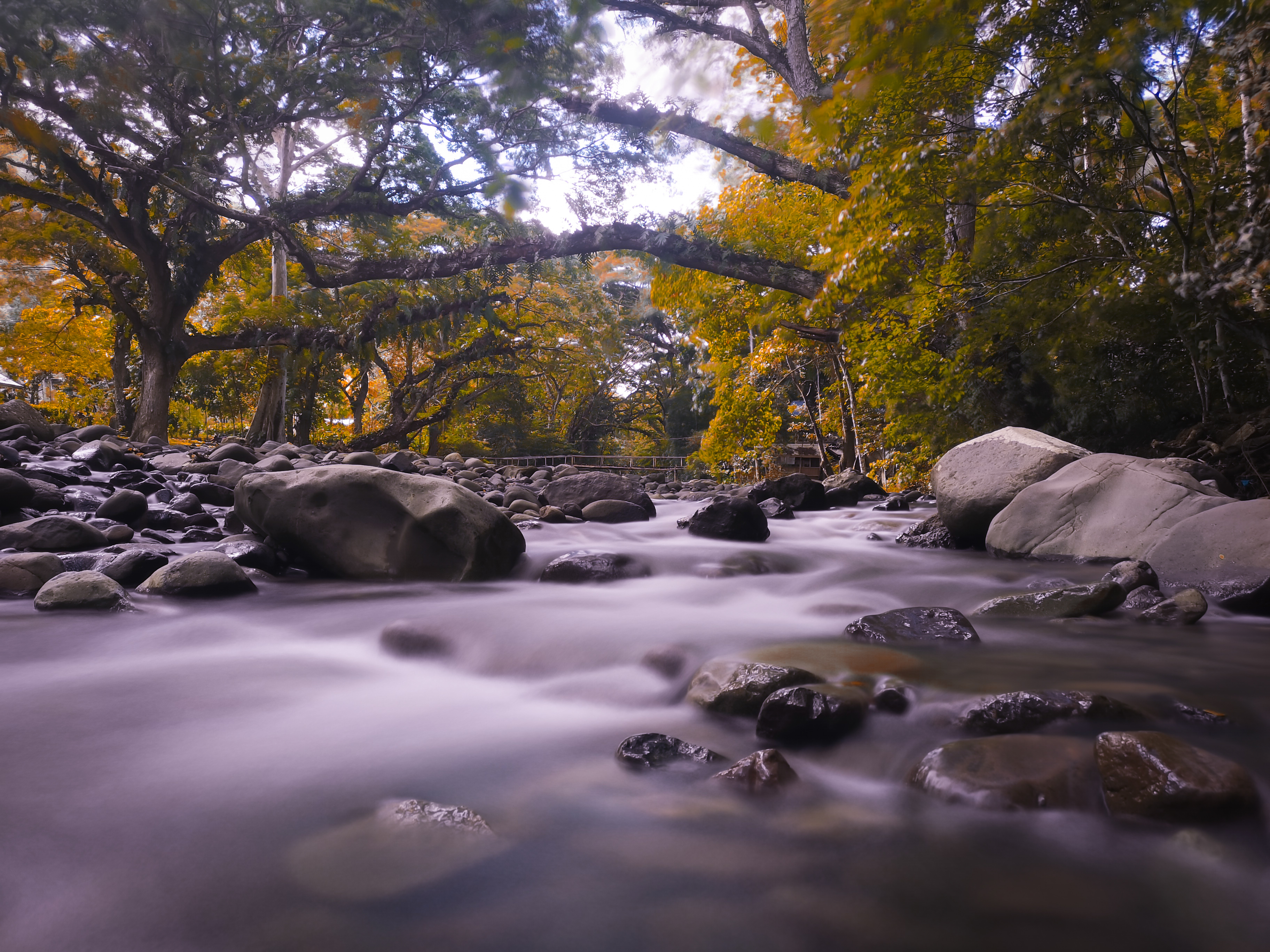
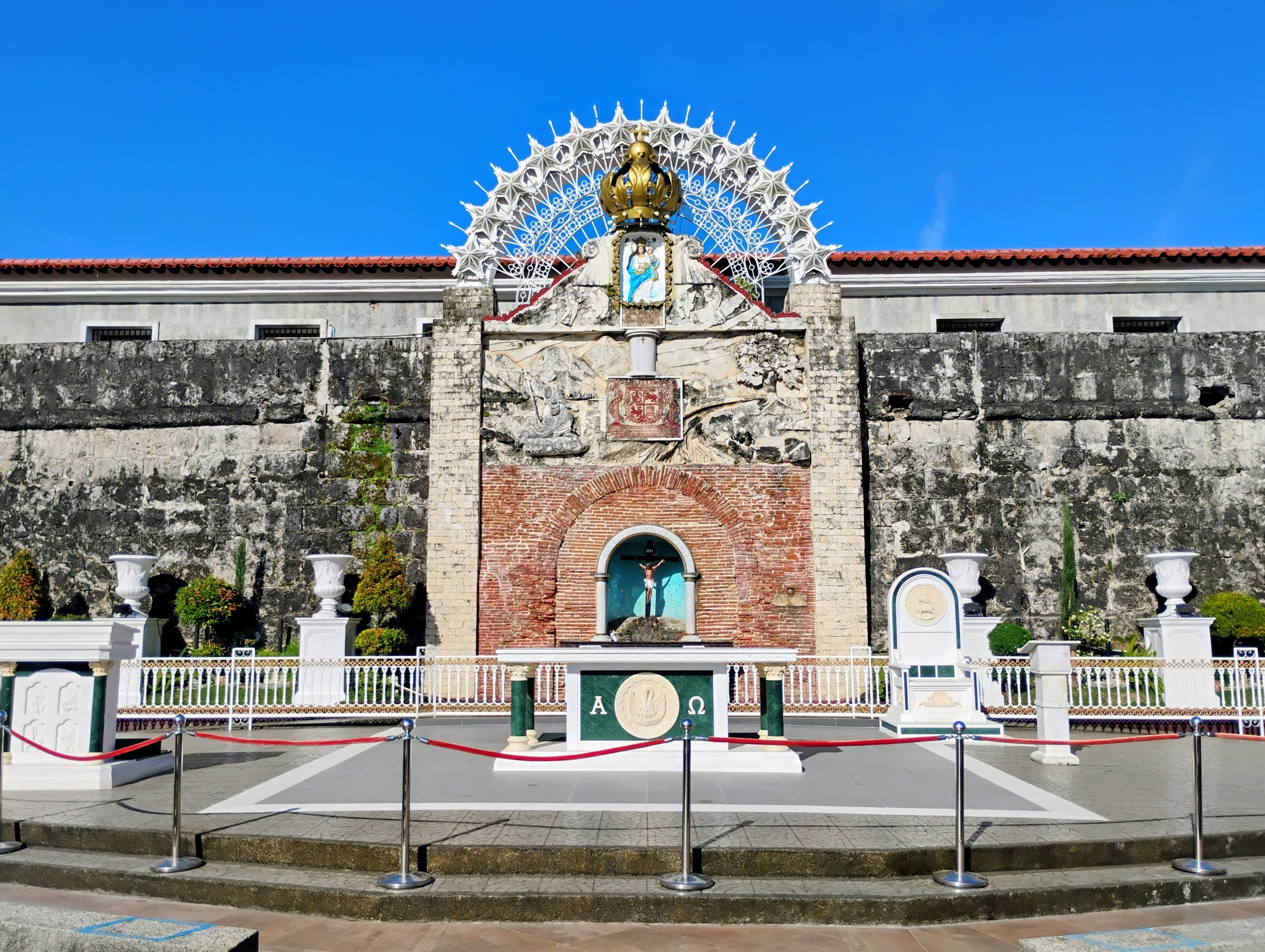
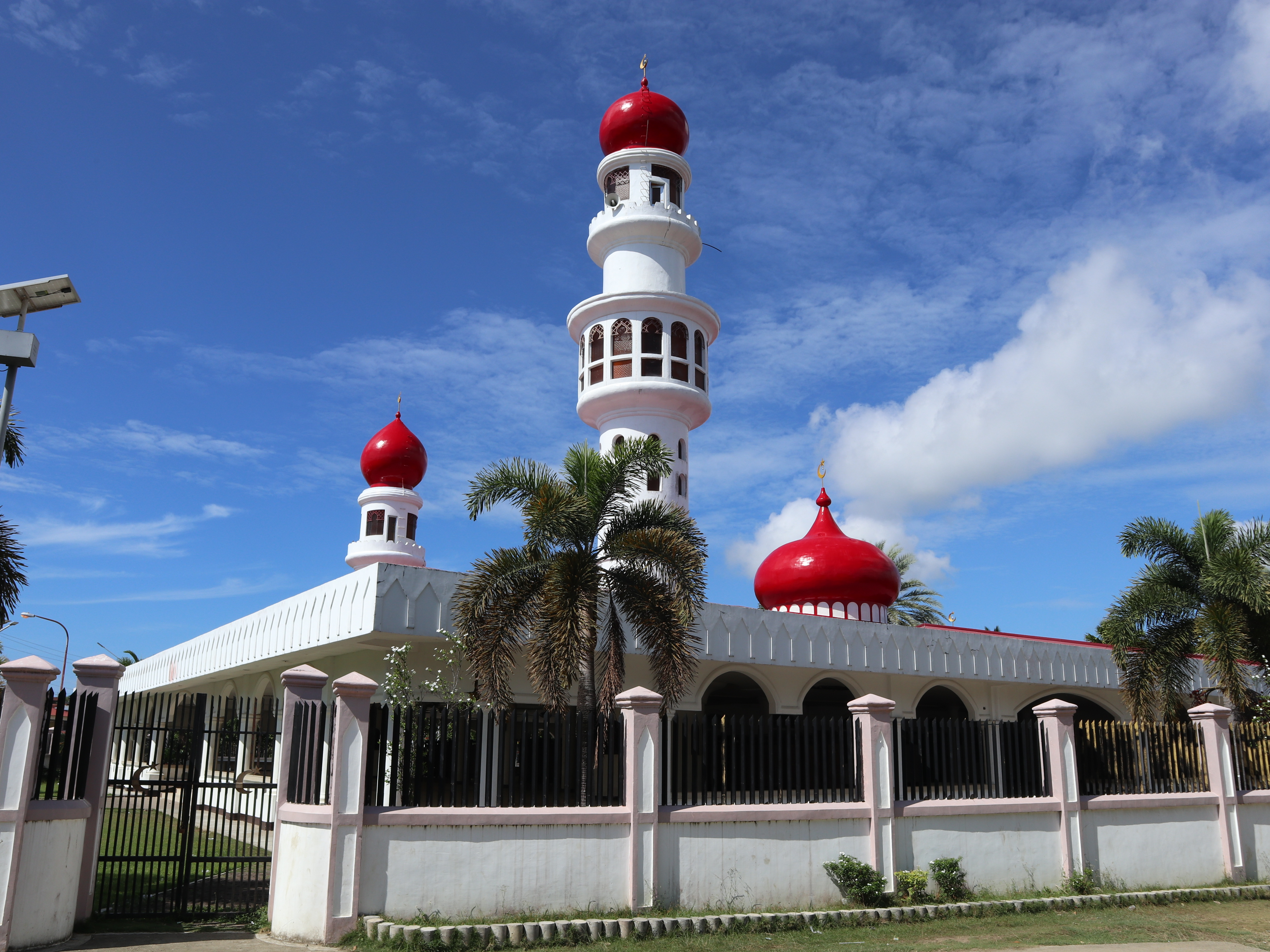
- Zamboanga City Hall Zamboanga Cathedral Plaza Pershing Great Santa Cruz Island Pasonanca Natural Park Fort Pilar Shrine Taluksangay Mosque

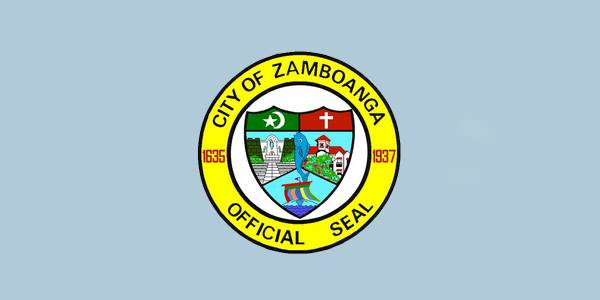
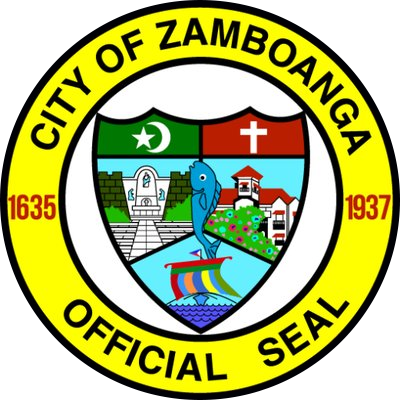
- Flag Seal
- Nicknames: City of Flowers; Asia's Latin City; Sardines Capital of The Philippines
- Motto: Build Back Better Zamboanga
- Anthem: Zamboanga Hermosa ("Beautiful Zamboanga")
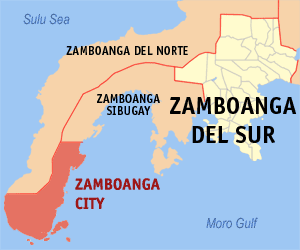
- Map of Zamboanga Peninsula with Zamboanga City highlighted
- Interactive map of Zamboanga City
- Location within the Philippines
- Coordinates: 6°54′15″N 122°04′34″E
- Country: Philippines
- Region: Zamboanga Peninsula
- Province: Zamboanga del Sur (statistically only)
- District: 1st (West Coast) and 2nd (East Coast) districts of Zamboanga City
- Founded: June 23, 1635
- Chartered: October 12, 1936
- Cityhood: February 26, 1937
- Highly urbanized city: November 22, 1983
- Barangays: 98 (see Barangays)

Government
  - Type: Sangguniang Panlungsod
  - Mayor: Khymer Adan Taing Olaso (NP)
  - Vice Mayor: Beng Climaco (AZAP)
  - Representatives: List: 1st LegDist (Costa Oeste); Katrina Reiko Chua-Tai (IND); 2nd LegDist (Costa Este); Jerry Evangelista Perez (AZAP)
  - City Council: Members: 1st District; Melchor Rey K. Sadain; Joselito A. Macrohon; Vicente M. Guingona; Joel Esteban; Vladimir Jimenez; El King K. Omaga; Elbert C. Atilano Sr.; Gian Paolo U. Enriquez; 2nd District; James P. Siason; Benjamin B. Guingona IV; Jihan El Rebollos Edding; Kimberly Anne D. Villaflores; Rolando Navarro Jr.; Hannah H. Nuño; Frederick N. Atilano; Rey B. Bayoging
  - Electorate: 483,058 voters (2025)

Area
  - Highly urbanized city: 1,453.27 km^{2} (561.11 sq mi)
  - Rank: 3rd (city)
- Elevation: 96 m (315 ft)
- Highest elevation: 1,358 m (4,455 ft)
- Lowest elevation: 0 m (0 ft)

Population (2024 census)
  - Highly urbanized city: 1,018,849
  - Rank: 6th
  - Density: 701.073/km^{2} (1,815.77/sq mi)
  - Urban: 2,100,000
  - Metro: 4,710,000 (Regional)
  - Households: 227,352
- Demonym: Zamboangueño (Major Ethnicity)

Economy
  - Gross domestic product (GDP): ₱151.33 billion (2024) $2.61 billion (2024)
  - Income class: 1st city income class
  - Poverty incidence: 11.1% (2023)
  - Revenue: ₱ 5,475 million (2024)
  - Assets: ₱ 25,113 million (2024)
  - Expenditure: ₱ 1,931 million (2024)
  - Liabilities: ₱ 3,094 million (2024)

Service provider
  - Electricity: Zamboanga City Electric Cooperative (ZAMCELCO)
- Time zone: UTC+8 (PST)
- ZIP code: 7000
- PSGC: 097332000
- IDD : area code: +63 (0)62
- Native languages: Chavacano Other Languages: Cebuano; Hiligaynon; Sama; Subanen; Tagalog; Tausug; Yakan; Filipino; English
- Website: Official website

Zamboanga City, officially the City of Zamboanga (Chavacano/Spanish: Ciudad de Zamboanga; Subanen: Bagbenwa Sembwangan; Sama: Lungsud Samboangan; Tausug: Daira sin Sambuwangan; Filipino: Lungsod ng Zamboanga; Cebuano: Dakbayan sa Zamboanga), is a highly urbanized city in the Zamboanga Peninsula region of the Philippines, with a total population of 1.02 million inhabitants. It is the third-largest city by land area in the Philippines, and is also the sixth-most populous city in the archipelago; additionally, it is the second most populous in Mindanao after Davao City. It is the commercial and industrial center of the Zamboanga Peninsula Region.

According to the 2024 census, the City of Zamboanga has a population of 1,018,894 people.

On October 12, 1936, Zamboanga became a chartered city under Commonwealth Act No. 39. It was inaugurated on February 26, 1937.

Zamboanga City is an independent, chartered city and was designated a highly urbanized city on November 22, 1983.

Although geographically separated and an independent, chartered city, Zamboanga City is grouped with the province of Zamboanga del Sur by the Philippine Statistics Authority for statistical purposes, yet it is governed independently of it. And also, it is the largest city of that province and in the entire Zamboanga Peninsula Region.

In 2028, the city's population is projected to hit the 1,200,000 population mark, which will make the city fall under the NEDA's classification of a Metropolitan City.

== Etymology ==
The name of Zamboanga is the Hispanicized spelling of the Sinama term for "mooring place" - samboangan (also spelled sambuangan; and in Subanen, sembwangan), from the root word samboang ("mooring pole"). "Samboangan" was the original name of Zamboanga City, from where the name of the peninsula is derived. "Samboangan" is well-attested in Spanish, British, French, German, and American historical records from as far back as the 17th century.

A commonly-repeated incorrect modern folk etymology instead attributes the name of Zamboanga to the Indonesian word jambangan (claimed to mean "place of flowers", but actually means "pot" or "bowl"), usually with claims that all ethnic groups in Zamboanga were "Malays". However, this name has never been attested in any historical records before the 1960s. The city's nickname "City of Flowers" is derived from such folk etymologies.

== History ==
=== Rajahnate of Sanmalan ===
The Zamboanga Peninsula was settled in the late 12th or early 13th century by the Subanen people; along with the Subanen, it was also the homeland of the ancestors of the Yakan, the Balanguingui, and other closely related Sama-Bajau peoples.

The 11th-century Chinese Song dynasty records also mention a polity named "Sanmalan" (三麻蘭) from Mindanao, which has a name similar to Zamboanga and has been tentatively identified with it by some authors (Wang, 2008; Huang, 1980). Sanmalan is said to be led by a Rajah "Chülan". His ambassador, "Ali Bakti", and that of the Butuan's "Likan-hsieh" are recorded as having visited the Chinese imperial court with gifts and trade goods in AD 1011. However, the correlation between Zamboanga and Sanmalan is based only on their similar-sounding names. Sanmalan is mentioned only in conjunction with Butuan (P'u-tuan), and it is unknown whether Sanmalan is indeed Zamboanga. The historian William Henry Scott (1989) also posits the possibility that Sanmalan instead referred to a polity of the Sama-Bajau ("Samal") people.

During the 13th century, the Tausūg people began migrating to the Zamboanga Peninsula and the Sulu Archipelago from their homelands in northeastern Mindanao. They became the dominant ethnic group in the archipelago after they were Islamized in the 14th century and established the Sultanate of Sulu in the 15th century. A majority of the Yakan, the Balanguingui, and the Sama-Bajau were also Islamized, though most of the Subanen remained animist (except the Kolibugan subgroup in southwestern Zamboanga).

=== Spanish rule ===
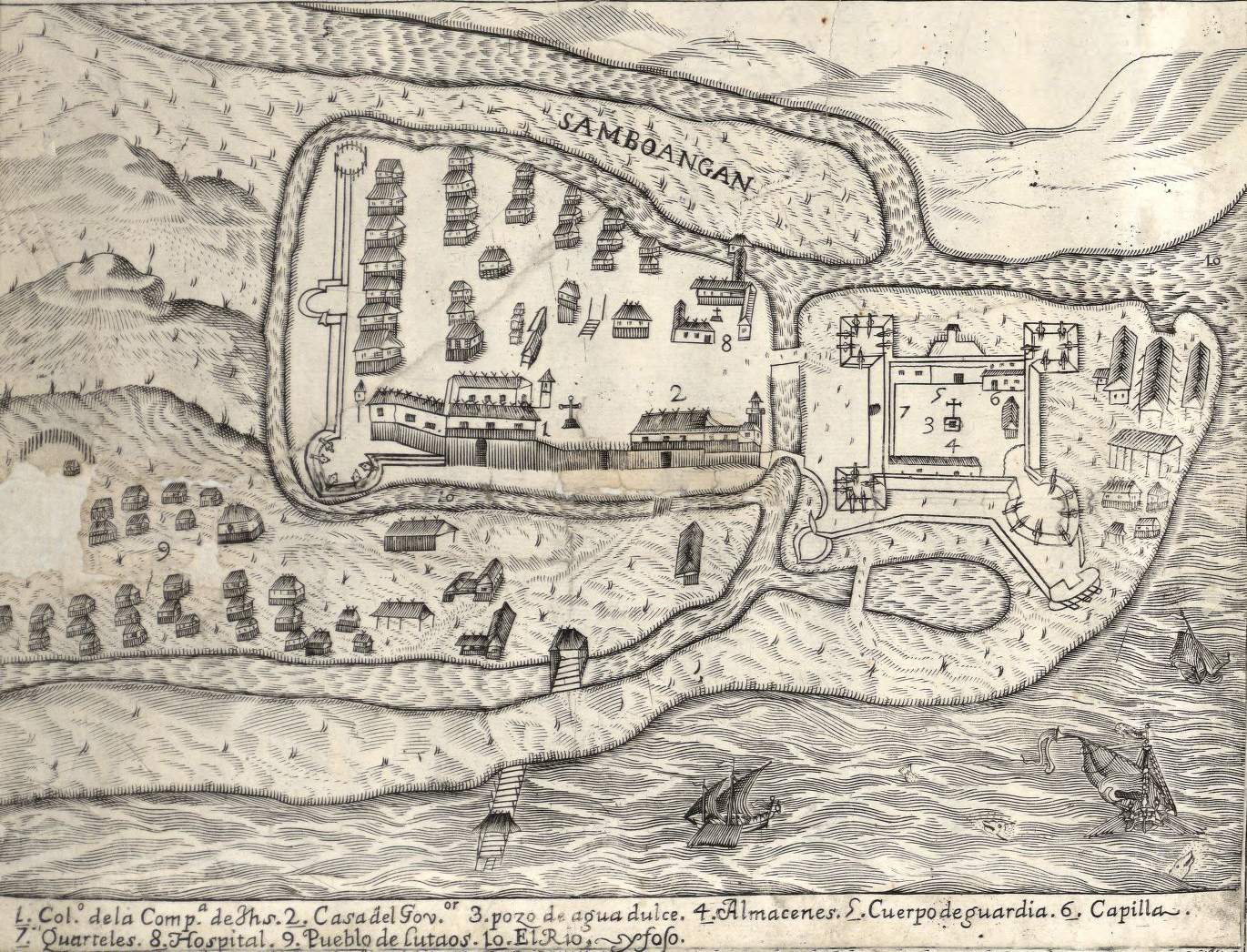
Illustration of Zamboanga ("Samboangan") and Fort Pilar, detail from the Carta Hydrographica y Chorographica de las Yslas Filipinas, 1734

Spanish explorers, led by Ferdinand Magellan, arrived in the Philippine archipelago in 1521. Zamboanga was chosen in 1569 as the site of the Spanish settlement and garrison on La Caldera (now part of Barangay Recodo). Spain granted the former polity in the area protectorate status against the Sulu Sultanate, its former overlord and the settlement's name was hispanized into Zamboanga and made a city. Zamboanga City was one of the main strongholds in Mindanao, supporting colonial efforts in the southern part of the island and paving the way for Christian settlements. It also served as a military outpost, protecting the island against foreign invaders and Moro pirates.

In 1599, the Zamboanga fort was closed and transferred to Cebú due to great concerns about an attack by the English on that island, which did not occur. After having abandoned the city, the Spaniards, as well as some Spanish-American soldiers from Peru and New Spain (Mexico) led by the former Governor of Panama, Don Sebastián Hurtado de Corcuera, who also brought along Genoese crusaders who had settled in Panama, joined forces with troops from Pampanga and Visayan soldiers (from Bohol, Cebu and Iloilo) and reached the shore of Zamboanga to bring peace to the island against Moro Muslim pirates.

In 1635, Spanish officers and soldiers, along with Visayan laborers, settled in the area, and construction began on Fort San José (now known as Fort Pilar) to protect the inhabitants from Moro piracy. Specifically, on April 5, 1635, Cebu sent a force of 300 Spanish and 1,000 Visayan troops to settle and colonize Zamboanga City under the command of Captain Juan de Chavez. Zamboanga became the main headquarters of the Spaniards on June 23, 1635, upon approval of King Philip IV of Spain; the Spanish officially founded the city. Thousands of Spanish troops, headed by a governor general from Spain, took the approval to build the first Zamboanga fortress (now called Fort Pilar) in Zamboanga to forestall enemies in Mindanao like Moro pirates and other foreign invaders. There were also a hundred Spanish troops sent to fortify the nearby Presidio of Iligan. During the years 1636 and 1654, the Presidio of Zamboanga received companies of 210 and 184 reinforcements of Mexican soldiers. The Zamboanga fortress became the main focus of several battles between Moros and Spaniards during Spanish rule in the region from the 16th century to the 18th. Spain was forced to abandon Zamboanga temporarily and withdraw its soldiers to Manila in 1662 after the Chinese under Koxinga threatened to invade the Spanish Philippines. Despite the official Spanish forces leaving, the Jesuits remained in Zamboanga. They shepherded the civilian Christian population and treated Zamboanga much like their reductions in Paraguay, until the Spanish returned.

The Spanish returned to Zamboanga in 1718, and rebuilding of the fort began the following year. The fort would serve as a defense for the Christian settlement against Moro pirates and foreign invaders for the coming years. There was the deportation of mostly Spanish-American and Spanish vagrants from Manila to Zamboanga, which helped advance a colonizing program against the Muslim south, further illustrating how the resistance to Spanish sovereignty in Mindanao and Borneo determined imperial policies on the islands.

While the region was already dominated by Catholicism, Muslims kept up a protracted struggle into the 18th century against the ruling Spaniards. A British naval squadron conducted a raid on Zamboanga in January 1798, but was driven off by the city's defensive fortifications. As a result of the census of 1818, there was a surveyed number of 8,640 souls in the province of Zamboanga.

There was a detachment of 100 Spanish soldiers from Manila. In addition, 2 companies of Spanish soldiers from other parts of the Spanish Empire (A standard company size is 100 men), resulting in 200 Spanish soldiers, as well as a company (100) of Kapampangan soldiers, were also garrisoned in Zamboanga. A large but unspecified proportion of the population were deployed by the Spanish military and were part of the Spanish Artillery and Navy, mostly made up Spaniards and Mexicans.

During 1821, the Uruguayan, Juan Fermín de San Martín, brother of the leader of the Argentinian Revolution, José de San Martín, was commander of the fortress-city of Zamboanga for a year. Before his assignment in Zamboanga he trained the native Guarani in the Jesuit Reductions of Paraguay, in wars against the Portuguese Empire's Bandeirantes slavers, supporting them in their independence wars against enslavement, before the Suppression of the Jesuits (Accused of supporting Native Americans against colonial interests) left the Paraguayans alone and without royal support. Without the Jesuits present to protect native interests, revolutions and wars of independence against the injustices committed by the Imperial powers towards the natives they ruled transpired. At 1823, inspired by the Spanish-American Wars of Independence, the Spanish-Americans who had been sent to Zamboanga and the Philippines as soldiers, joined in the revolt of Andres Novales; he fought for sovereignty and became the short-lived Emperor of the Philippines. Due to the era of the Latin American Wars of Independence, Spain feared that the large Mexican and South American population in the Philippines would incite the Filipinos to rebel, thus the Spaniards direct from Spain were imported (Peninsulares) and the Latin American class in the Philippines were displaced and were forced into a lower rank of the caste system, which they reacted negatively to. In 1831, the custom house in Zamboanga was established as a port, and it became the main port for direct communication, trading some goods and other services to most of Europe, Southeast Asia and Latin America. The American invaders arrived in the Philippines during the time of Spanish Governor General Valeriano Weyler, with thousands of troops to defeat the Spaniards who ruled for over three centuries.

Other descriptions of Zamboanga also speak of the mixed origins of its residents. Thus, Vendrell and Eduard (Year:1887 - Page:62), in speaking of Zamboanga, observed and said the following: ("Estos indgenas, la inmensa mayoría mestizos españoles, proceden en su origen de otras provincias del Archipélago, y muchos de Méjico, de donde llegaron á principios de este siglo, cuando perdimos aquel imperio.") And when translated to English; "These indigenous people, the great majority of whom are Spanish mestizos, originally come from other provinces and from México, whence they arrived at the beginning of this century when we lost that empire."

The Spanish government sent more than 80,000 Spanish troops to the Philippines. The Spanish government completely surrendered the islands to the United States in the 1890s.

=== Establishing its own Republic ===
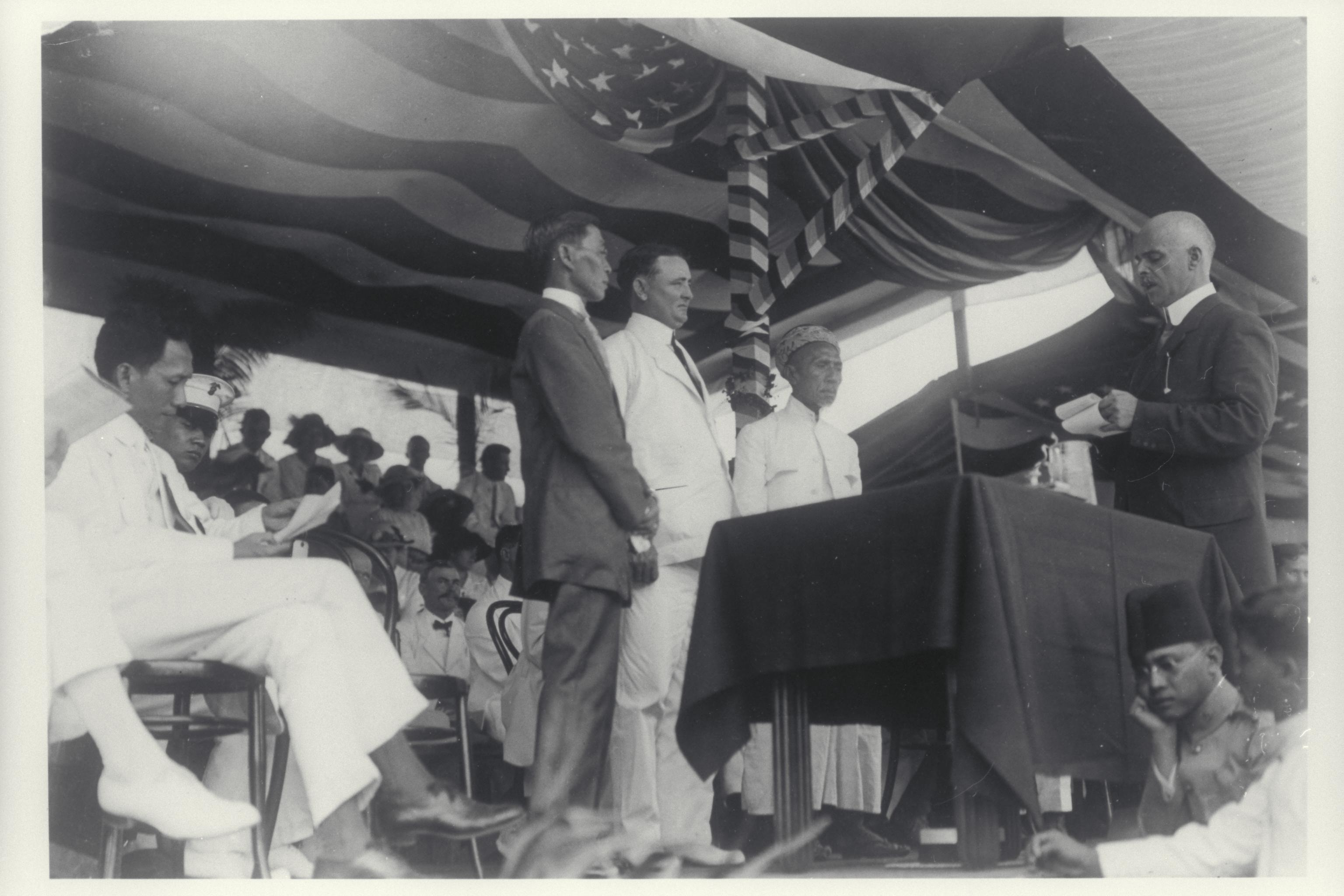
Inauguration of the Municipality of Zamboanga with Datu Kalun (1901)

The Republic of Zamboanga was established directly on May 28, 1899, after the Zamboangueño revolutionary forces defeated the last Spanish government in Zamboanga. Fort Pilar was turned over to General Vicente Álvarez, who, between May and November 1899, was the first president of the República de Zamboanga. He assembled a revolutionary army which was diverse and filled with Christians, Muslims, and Lumads. This republic continued to exist until 1903, with Isidoro Midel as its second president under a puppet government of the United States; he was succeeded by Mariano Arquiza.

=== American occupation ===
Upon the firm establishment of American colonization and dissolution of the Republic in 1903, Zamboanga, as a municipality, was designated as the capital of the Moro Province, a semi-military government consisting of five districts: Zamboanga, Cotabato, Davao, Lanao and Sulu. It established itself the center of commerce, trade, and government of Mindanao Island. During this period, Zamboanga hosted some American regional governors, including General John J. Pershing, who was military commander/governor of the Moro Province from 1909 to 1914.

In 1920, Zamboanga City ceased to be capital of the Moro Province when the department was divided into provinces in which the city became under the large province of Zamboanga. This encompasses the present-day Zamboanga Peninsula, including the entire province of Basilan.

=== Commonwealth era and city charter ===
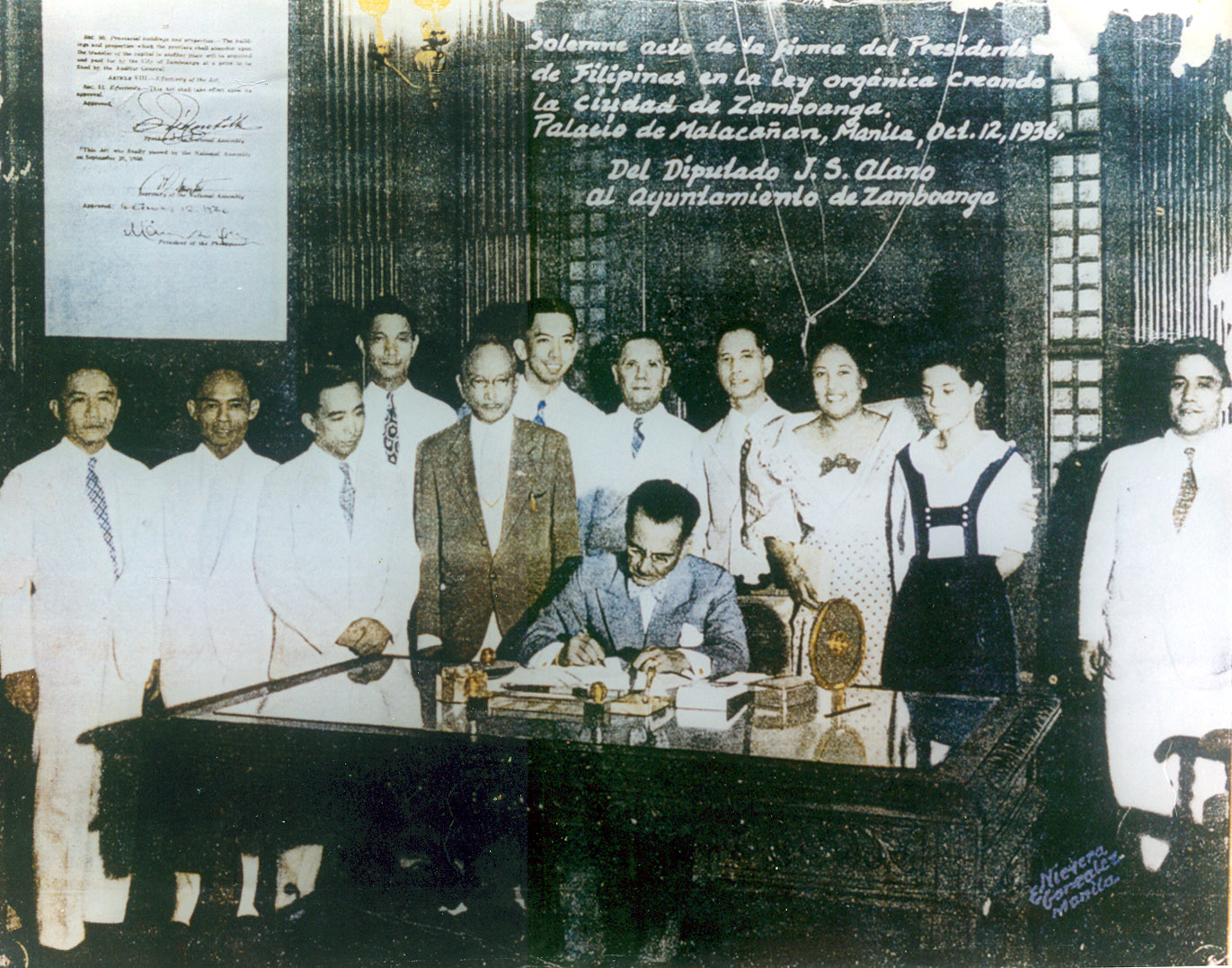
President Manuel L. Quezon signing the City Charter of Zamboanga in a ceremony held at the Malacañang Palace in (1936)

When the Commonwealth government was established in 1935, calls to convert the municipality of Zamboanga into a city increased. On September 23, 1936, through Assemblyman Juan Alano, the National Assembly of the Philippines passed Commonwealth Act No. 39 making Zamboanga a chartered city consisting of "the present territorial jurisdiction of the municipality of Zamboanga, the municipality of Bolong, the municipal district of Taluksangay, the whole island of Basilan and the adjacent islands, i.e., the municipality of Isabela, the municipal district of Lamitan, and the municipal district of Maluso." It was later signed by President Manuel Quezon on October 12, 1936. The charter made Zamboanga City the largest city in the world by land area. During these times, Zamboanga was the leading commercial and industrial city of Mindanao.

Before World War II, Pettit Barracks, a part of the U.S. Army's 43d Infantry Regiment (PS), was stationed there.

=== World War II ===
When the Japanese invaded the Philippines, they were headed by Vice Admiral Rokuzo Sugiyama, accompanied by Rear Admiral Naosaburo Irifune. The Japanese imperial forces landed at Zamboanga City on March 2, 1942. The city became a branch hub of Unit 731 for human experimentation conducted by Japanese doctors. Among the experiments include amputations, dissections, and vivisections on live Filipinos.

American and Filipino forces overthrew the Japanese occupation in the city following a fierce battle on March 10–12, 1945. The rebuilt general headquarters of the Philippine Commonwealth Army and Philippine Constabulary was stationed in Zamboanga City from March 13, 1945, to June 30, 1946, during the military operations in Mindanao and Sulu against the Japanese imperial forces.

=== Contemporary history ===
==== After World War II ====
After the war, citizens on the island of Basilan found it difficult to appear in courts, pay their taxes, or seek help from the mayor and other officials. Going from Basilan to the mainland required three or more hours of ferry travel. To fix the problem, Representative Juan Alano filed a bill in Congress to separate Basilan from Zamboanga City. The island of Basilan was proclaimed a separate city through Republic Act No. 288 on July 16, 1948.

On April 7, 1953, by virtue of Republic Act No. 840, the city was classified as a first-class city according to its revenue.

On April 29, 1955, a special law changed the landscape of the city government when Republic Act No. 1210 amended the City Charter that made elective the position of city mayor and the creation of an elective vice mayor and eight elective city councilors. The vice mayor is the presiding officer of the City Council. In November 1955, Liberal Party candidate Cesar Climaco, with his running mate, Tomas Ferrer, won the first local elections. They were inducted into office on January 1, 1956, as determined by the Revised Election Code.

==== Martial law years ====
On September 21, 1972, President Ferdinand Marcos signed Proclamation No. 1081 placing the Philippines under martial law. Zamboanga City's local government came under presidential control for the first time since 1955. Marcos extended Mayor Joaquin Enriquez's term when his tenure was about to end in 1975.

President Marcos reorganized the local government on November 14, 1975. The city council was replaced by a Sangguniang Panlungsod with the mayor as its new presiding officer and its members included the vice mayor, the chairman of the Katipunan ng mga Kabataang Barangay, the president of the Association of Barangay Captains, and sectoral representatives of agriculture, business and labor.

When Mayor Enriquez resigned and bid for the newly created Interim Batasang Pambansa in 1978, Vice Mayor Jose Vicente Atilano II was appointed by President Marcos to replace him.

==== Climaco's return and assassination (1980–1984) ====
In 1980, Cesar Climaco staged his political comeback when he was elected again to the mayoral post under his new party, the Concerned Citizens' Aggrupation. He had gone into exile to the United States in protest against Marcos' declaration of martial law.

In the 1984 Philippine parliamentary election, Climaco was elected a member of the Regular Batasang Pambansa. However, he declined to assume his seat until he had completed his six-year term as mayor in his consistent protest against Marcos. Climaco's protest against the dictator earned Zamboanga City the distinction of 'the beacon of democracy in Mindanao'.

On the morning of November 14, 1984, Climaco was assassinated as he was returning to his office after overseeing the response to a fire in downtown Zamboanga City. A man approached from behind the mayor and shot him in the nape at point-blank range.

Marcos administration officials pinned the blame on a Muslim group led by Rizal Alih, but Climaco's widow publicly expressed belief that it was Marcos' forces who were behind the murder. Climaco himself was said to have remarked before his death that if he were ever assassinated, the military would blame Alih for the murder. The family banned military personnel from the wake, except for a relative who happened to be in the Air Force.

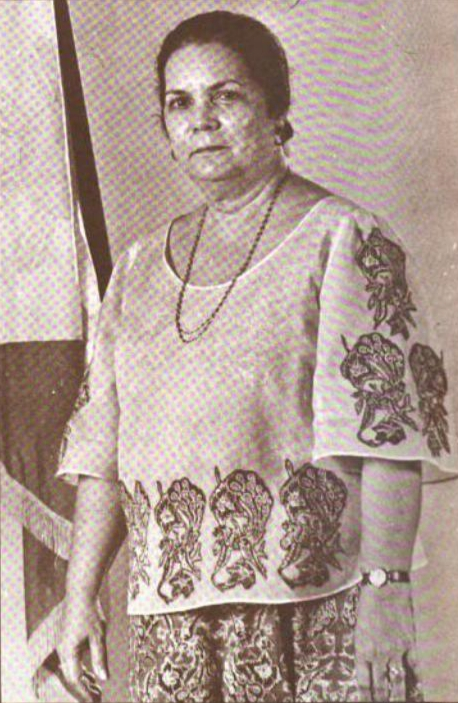
Former Zamboanga city mayor, the late Maria Clara Lobregat.

Climaco's funeral at Abong-Abong Park in Zamboanga City was estimated as ranging from fifteen thousand people to up to two hundred thousand people, and he was later honored by having his name inscribed on the wall of remembrance of the Philippines' Bantayog ng mga Bayani (Memorial of Heroes), which honors the martyrs and heroes who fought the dictatorship.

==== 21st century ====
On November 19, 2001, the Cabatangan Government Complex in Barangay Cabatangan, the seat of the Autonomous Region in Muslim Mindanao, was raided by former MNLF fighters in protest of Misuari's ouster as Governor of the autonomous region in which they took residents hostage. The complex also houses various regional government offices, such as the Commission on Audit, Population Commission, Civil Service Commission, Area Vocational Rehabilitation Center, DECS Training Center, and the Zamboanga Arturo Eustaquio College Department of Criminology. An air strike by the military began on November 27, in which the hostages were later released after the government agreed to escort the rebels to a safe zone in Panubigan, where they were allowed to go free.

In 2013, Maria Isabelle Climaco Salazar, niece of former Mayor Cesar Climaco, was elected the second woman mayor of the city.

==== Zamboanga City crisis ====
On September 9, 2013, a faction of the Moro National Liberation Front (MNLF) under the leadership of Nur Misuari seized hostages in Zamboanga City and attempted to raise the flag of the self-proclaimed Bangsamoro Republik, a state which declared its independence earlier in August, in Talipao, Sulu. This armed incursion was met by the Armed Forces of the Philippines, which sought to free the hostages and expel the MNLF from Zamboanga City. The standoff degenerated into urban warfare and brought parts of the city to a standstill for days.

Mayor Climaco-Salazar and her administration are relocating the internally displaced persons (IDPs) affected by the crisis to temporary sites and, later, to permanent housing in various places around Zamboanga City. Her rehabilitation plan, "Zamboanga City Roadmap to Recovery and Rehabilitation (Z3R)", envisions building back a better Zamboanga City and rehabilitating the areas affected by the crisis.

== Geography ==
=== Geology ===
The southwest and eastern sides of Zamboanga City are bounded by irregular coastlines with generally rocky terrain and occasional stretches of sandy or gravelly beaches. The coastal profile usually descends abruptly towards the sea. Where rivers enter the sea, bays have formed, and the surrounding area has filled up with alluvial soils, producing small to large coastal plains.

Zamboanga City has mangrove areas, such as in Tagasilay and eastern Vitali Island. It also has the Pasonanca Watershed Forest Reserve.

=== Topography ===
The overall topography of the city could be described as rolling to very steep. There are some flat lands, mostly narrow strips along the east coast. The urban center is mostly flat with a gentle slope to the interior, ranging from 0% to 3%. A portion of about 38,000 hectares has slopes ranging from 18% to 30%. Another 26,000 hectares have slopes of less than 3%, while about 37% of the area (52,000 hectares) has slopes ranging from 30% to more than 50%. The highest registered elevation is 1,200 meters.

The city's territorial jurisdiction includes the islands of Big and Small Santa Cruz, Tictabon, Sacol, Manalipa, Tumalutap, and Vitali, as well as numerous other islands. The total land area of the city is recorded to be 142,067.95 hectares or 1,420.6795 square kilometers and with contested land area of 3,259.07 hectares between the boundary of Limpapa and Zamboanga del Norte, consolidated of the total land area 145,327.02 hectares or 1,453.2702 km^{2} according to the latest cadastral survey of DENR IX year 2015. This does not include the area of about 25 other islands within the territorial jurisdiction of the city – which have an aggregate area of 6,248.5 hectares as verified by the Office of the City Engineer. Putting these all together, the city's new total land area would come to 151,575.52 hectares or 1,515.75 km^{2}.

=== Climate ===
Climate data for Zamboanga City (1991–2020, extremes 1903–present)
Month	Jan	Feb	Mar	Apr	May	Jun	Jul	Aug	Sep	Oct	Nov	Dec	Year
Record high °C (°F)	36.0 (96.8)	36.2 (97.2)	37.0 (98.6)	37.9 (100.2)	37.4 (99.3)	37.8 (100.0)	36.7 (98.1)	36.2 (97.2)	36.1 (97.0)	36.4 (97.5)	37.4 (99.3)	36.4 (97.5)	37.9 (100.2)
Mean daily maximum °C (°F)	32.3 (90.1)	32.7 (90.9)	33.1 (91.6)	33.2 (91.8)	33.0 (91.4)	32.3 (90.1)	32.1 (89.8)	32.3 (90.1)	32.5 (90.5)	32.3 (90.1)	32.8 (91.0)	32.6 (90.7)	32.6 (90.7)
Daily mean °C (°F)	28.0 (82.4)	28.2 (82.8)	28.5 (83.3)	28.9 (84.0)	28.9 (84.0)	28.5 (83.3)	28.2 (82.8)	28.4 (83.1)	28.4 (83.1)	28.2 (82.8)	28.4 (83.1)	28.3 (82.9)	28.4 (83.1)
Mean daily minimum °C (°F)	23.6 (74.5)	23.7 (74.7)	24.0 (75.2)	24.5 (76.1)	24.8 (76.6)	24.6 (76.3)	24.4 (75.9)	24.4 (75.9)	24.3 (75.7)	24.1 (75.4)	24.0 (75.2)	23.9 (75.0)	24.2 (75.6)
Record low °C (°F)	15.8 (60.4)	15.6 (60.1)	17.5 (63.5)	16.7 (62.1)	20.7 (69.3)	20.4 (68.7)	20.0 (68.0)	19.0 (66.2)	19.9 (67.8)	18.4 (65.1)	18.5 (65.3)	16.7 (62.1)	15.6 (60.1)
Average rainfall mm (inches)	69.1 (2.72)	55.2 (2.17)	67.8 (2.67)	77.0 (3.03)	90.4 (3.56)	140.4 (5.53)	150.3 (5.92)	133.7 (5.26)	160.4 (6.31)	197.4 (7.77)	104.9 (4.13)	75.8 (2.98)	1,322.4 (52.06)
Average rainy days (≥ 0.1 mm)	7	6	7	7	9	12	12	11	11	13	10	8	113
Average relative humidity (%)	80	79	78	80	81	83	83	82	82	83	82	82	81
Average dew point °C (°F)	23.6 (74.5)	23.5 (74.3)	23.8 (74.8)	24.5 (76.1)	24.8 (76.6)	24.6 (76.3)	24.5 (76.1)	24.5 (76.1)	24.4 (75.9)	24.5 (76.1)	24.4 (75.9)	24.2 (75.6)	24.3 (75.7)
Mean monthly sunshine hours	220.5	213.0	225.2	222.4	219.4	164.2	187.2	213.1	187.4	172.9	217.6	226.6	2,469.5
Source 1: PAGASA
Source 2: Deutscher Wetterdienst (sun, 1961–1990)

Zamboanga City features a tropical monsoon climate under the Köppen climate classification (Am).

=== Barangays ===
Zamboanga City is politically subdivided into 98 barangays. Each barangay consists of puroks while some have sitios.

These are grouped into two congressional districts, with 38 barangays on the West Coast and 60 on the East Coast.

== Demographics ==
Population census of Zamboanga City

Year	Pop.	±% p.a.
1903	20,692	—
1918	42,007	+4.83%
1939	43,894	+0.21%
1948	103,317	+9.98%
1960	131,489	+2.03%
1970	199,901	+4.27%

Year	Pop.	±% p.a.
1975	265,023	+5.82%
1980	343,722	+5.34%
1990	442,345	+2.56%
1995	511,139	+2.75%
2000	601,794	+3.56%
2007	774,407	+3.54%

Year	Pop.	±% p.a.
2010	807,129	+1.52%
2015	861,799	+1.26%
2020	977,234	+2.68%
2024	1,018,849	+1.01%

Source: Philippine Statistics Authority

Zamboanga City is the 5th most populous in the Philippines and the 2nd most populous in Mindanao after Davao City. The city's population increased by 115,435 over the five years since 2015. It had an annual population growth rate of 2.50%, higher than during 2010-2015, which was 1.3%. The city's population was estimated to have reached 1 million in 2021. Among the city's 98 barangays, Talon-Talon is the most populous with 4.1% share of this city's population, followed by Mampang (4.0%), Tumaga (3.6%), Tetuan (3.5%), Calarian (3.4%), San Roque and Pasonanca (both with 3.2%).

=== Religion ===
According to statistics compiled by the Philippine government, one of the most dominant religions in Zamboanga City is Roman Catholicism, followed by Islam and Evangelical Protestantism.

Other religious practices and denominations in the city were Buddhism, paganism, animism, and Sikhism.

==== Roman Catholicism ====
Zamboanga Cathedral

With 56.93% of the city's population, Roman Catholicism remains the predominant religion in the city. Zamboanga City was the first to establish its own Catholic diocese in Mindanao (now the Roman Catholic Archdiocese of Zamboanga).

The Metropolitan Cathedral of the Immaculate Conception serves as the seat of the Archdiocese of Zamboanga. Domingo Abarro III designed it. The first church was located at the front of Plaza Pershing, where the present Universidad de Zamboanga stands. The church was designated a cathedral in 1910 when the diocese of Zamboanga City was created. In 1943, the cathedral was one of the edifices bombarded by Japanese soldiers during World War II. In 1956, the cathedral was relocated beside Ateneo de Zamboanga University, formerly known as the Jardin de Chino, where Chinese farmers grew the city's vegetables.

The titular patroness is Nuestra Señora La Virgen del Pilar de Zaragoza, and its secondary patron is Pope Pius X.

==== Islam ====
Sadik Grand Mosque, still under construction, will become the largest mosque in Southeast Asia once completed.

Muslims have also been an integral part of Zamboanga, comprising 47.62% of the city's population.

The majority of Muslims in Zamboanga City adhere to Ahlus Sunnah wal Jama'ah, following the Ash'arī creed and the Shāfi'ī school of Islamic jurisprudence, while also maintaining a living tradition of Tasawwuf (Sufism). This mainstream Sunni community is under the religious leadership of the Grand Mufti of Darul Ifta Region 9 and Palawan, the regional Islamic juristic and advisory body.

Prominent Sunni madrasahs in the city include Sabiel al-Muhtadin Institute, Darul Makhdumeen, Salamat Islamic Institute, and Sadik Islamic Institute, which continue to serve as centers of Arabic and Islamic education for Tausug, Sama, and Yakan youth.

Sufi traditions remain vibrant in the city. The Masjid Shaykh Abdul Qadir Jilani in Talon-Talon is a well-known spiritual center affiliated with the Naqshbandi Haqqani Ṭarīqa, under the international guidance of Shaykh Mehmet Adil, while the Masjid Ar-Rayyan in Baliwasan Grande is associated with the Shādhilī Ṭarīqa under Shaykh Muhammad bin Yahya al-Ninowy. These institutions host regular gatherings for dhikr (spiritual remembrance), community service, and interfaith outreach.

While Wahhabi-influenced and Shia minorities also exist in Zamboanga City, they remain small in number. However, both have a notable media and online presence, contributing to the diversity of Islamic discourse within the region.

Some barangays, such as Campo Islam, Taluksangay, and the city's island barangays are almost entirely Muslim, due to historical migration from the provinces of Sulu and Tawi-Tawi — primarily among the Tausug and Samal communities. There are also native Subanon Muslims, known locally as Kolibugan, and the Yakan of Basilan, who have migrated to Zamboanga and established thriving communities.

Muslim-majority barangays in Zamboanga do not celebrate Catholic fiestas, but instead observe ʻĪd al-Fiṭr (Hari Raya Puasa), ʻĪd al-Adḥā (Hari Raya Haji), Mawlid of the Islamic prophet Muhammad, Nisf Sha'ban, Isra wal Mi'raj, and Amun Jadid, which are public occasions of prayer, charity, and communal gathering.

==== Other Christian denominations ====
With the inception of the American era, Protestant sects were introduced. Christian and Missionary Alliance, Philippine Independent Church, Seventh-day Adventist, The Church of Jesus Christ of Latter-day Saints, and United Church of Christ in the Philippines are included. Most Protestants are migrants, mostly of Cebuano or Ilocano ethnicity. Members of Iglesia ni Cristo live in Zamboanga City, comprising 0.65% of the city's total household population in 2020.

=== Ethnicities ===
The Zamboangueño (people) (Chavacano/Spanish: Pueblo Zamboangueño) are a creole ethnolinguistic group of people from the Philippines originating from the Zamboanga peninsula, where Zamboanga City is also situated. The ancestors of the city's present inhabitants are also said to have migrated to other areas in Southwestern Mindanao. Due to migration, along with the original inhabitants of the place, the Subanon people, several other ethnicities have a visible presence in the city, such as the Samal, Yakan, Tausug, and Badjao peoples.

According to a genetic study in 2021 by Larena et al., published in the Proceedings of the National Academy of Sciences of the United States, 4 of 10 Zamboangueños/Chavacanos have "West Eurasian ancestry". The limited Spanish descent of the minority is likely from Spanish soldiers in the Philippines stationed in the area centuries ago during the colonial era. Spanish soldiers from Mexico and Peru were also assigned to the area before, but it is not known if they stayed in the city and had children there.

=== Languages ===
The lingua franca of the city is Chavacano. Originally, the area's language was largely the Subanon language, as the majority of the population was from the Subanon people, who lived in their ancestral land of Zamboanga. Due to the Spanish conquest, the natives were not able to pass their indigenous language to the next generation, and the colonial officers forced them to learn Spanish instead. This led to the development of the Spanish language into what later became Chavacano. The Zamboanga variety of Chavacano has Spanish as its lexifier and has grammar influenced by other Austronesian languages of the Philippines, notably Subanon and others. Some people speak the ancestral Subanon language in the city, though few understand it due to a lack of speakers, many of whom have been heavily influenced by colonial rule. The local government has not yet spearheaded revitalization attempts of the indigenous Subanon language. Aside from Chavacano, Filipino, and English are also widely used and understood, with the latter two as the official languages of the Philippines, and with Filipino as the national language and the lingua franca of the Philippines. The Bahasa Sug or Tausug language is the second-most-spoken language in the city after Chavacano, due to significant Tausug migration from the neighboring provinces of the Sulu Archipelago. The Cebuano, Hiligaynon, Ilocano, Maguindanaon, Maranao, Sama, and Yakan languages can also be heard within the city, most especially among their native speakers, ethnolinguistic groups, or cultural communities, and with Cebuano as the third-most spoken language in the city after Bahasa Sug.

== Economy ==
Poverty incidence of Zamboanga (%)

Source: Philippine Statistics Authority

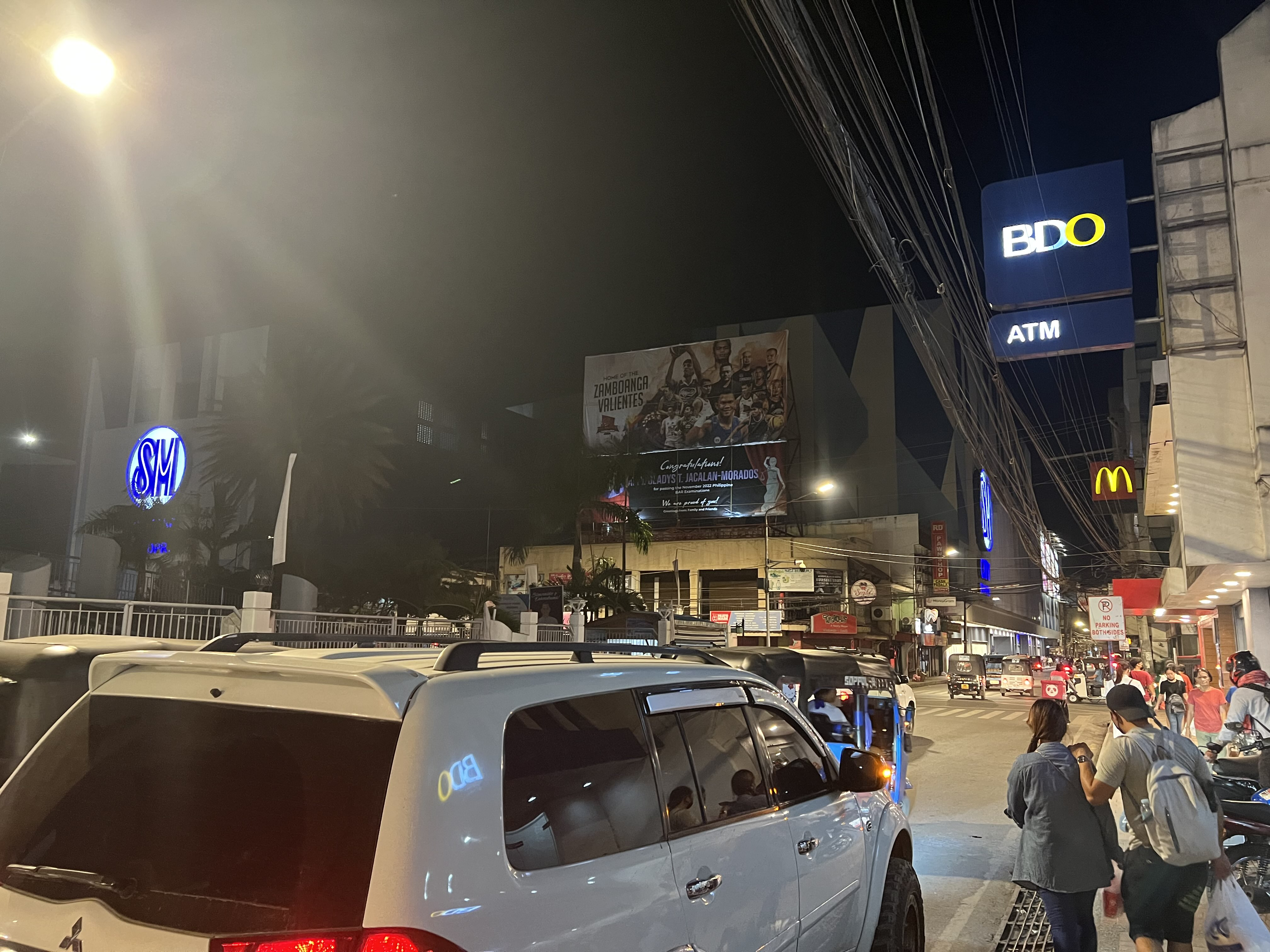
La Purisima Street at Night

Zamboanga City's economy consistently grew by leaps and bounds from the pre-pandemic level of P125.05 billion to a record high of P139.47 billion in 2022.

The figures also reflected the city's Gross Domestic Product (GDP) growth, rising from P125.05 billion in 2018 to P130.82 billion (4.6 percent up) in 2019, but plummeting to P122.69 billion (-6.2 percent) in 2020 due to the pandemic.

However, as the City gradually reopened its economy after the pandemic, the GDP grew by 5.1 percent to P128.97 billion in 2021, and jumped to 8.1 percent in 2022, bringing the city's economic value to P139.47 billion.

Zamboanga City accounts for one-third of Zamboanga Peninsula's Gross Domestic Product. (GDP) Accounting over 32.6% of the region's P427.78 Billion GDP, the largest share of any province or city in the region. in 2022, Zamboanga City's economy grew by 8.1%

Zamboanga City's economy is the third largest in Mindanao, after Davao and Cagayan de Oro.

=== Sardine industry ===
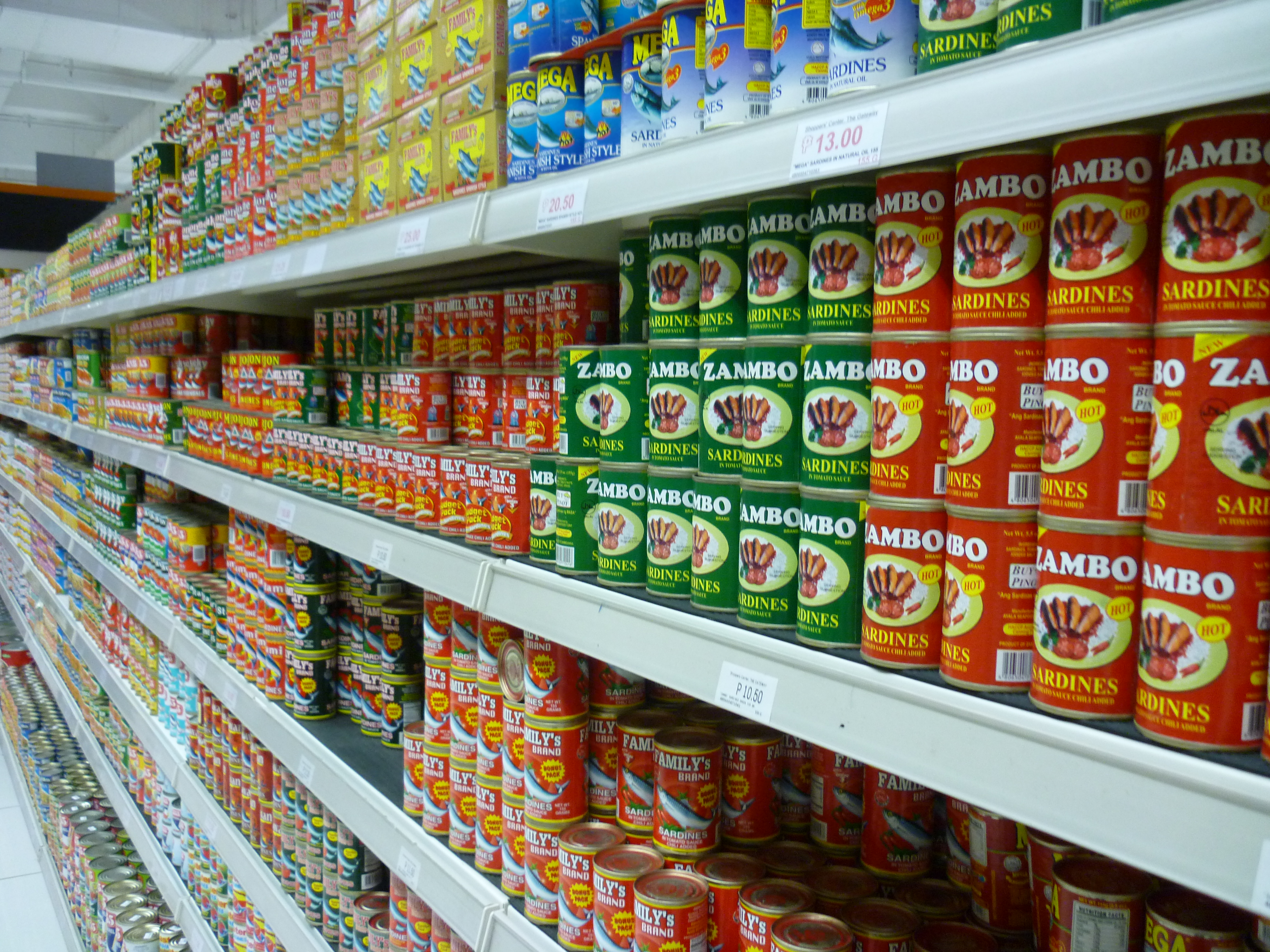
Zamboanga-made Sardines in supermarket shelves

Zamboanga City is also dubbed the Sardines Capital of the Philippines, for 11 out of 12 sardine companies in the country are produced here. The canning factories are converged in the west coast of Zamboanga. Sardine fishing and processing account for about 70 percent of the city's economy. Situated at the western tip of the Mindanao mainland, Zamboanga City is a natural docking point for vessels traversing the rich fishing grounds of the Zamboanga Peninsula and the Sulu Archipelago.

The production of canned sardines in this city has been upgraded to conform to international food safety and quality standards. Companies that produce these goods are looking to enter new markets in Russia and other European countries.

Most sardine fishing fleets and canning factories are located in Zamboanga City due to its proximity to the Sulu Sea's rich fishing grounds. To date, 26 registered commercial fishing companies operating 87 sardine purse-seine fleets and 569 boats of different classifications that fish in the Zamboanga and Sulu waters are based in Zamboanga City (BFAR IX 2015).

The 11 canned sardine corporations operating 12 manufacturing plants, four tin can manufacturers, and 4 ship construction and ship repair companies. The city supplies approximately 85–90% of the country's canned sardine requirements and the canned sardines sector contributes at least US$16 million in annual export earnings to the city

=== Zamboanga City Special Economic Zone ===
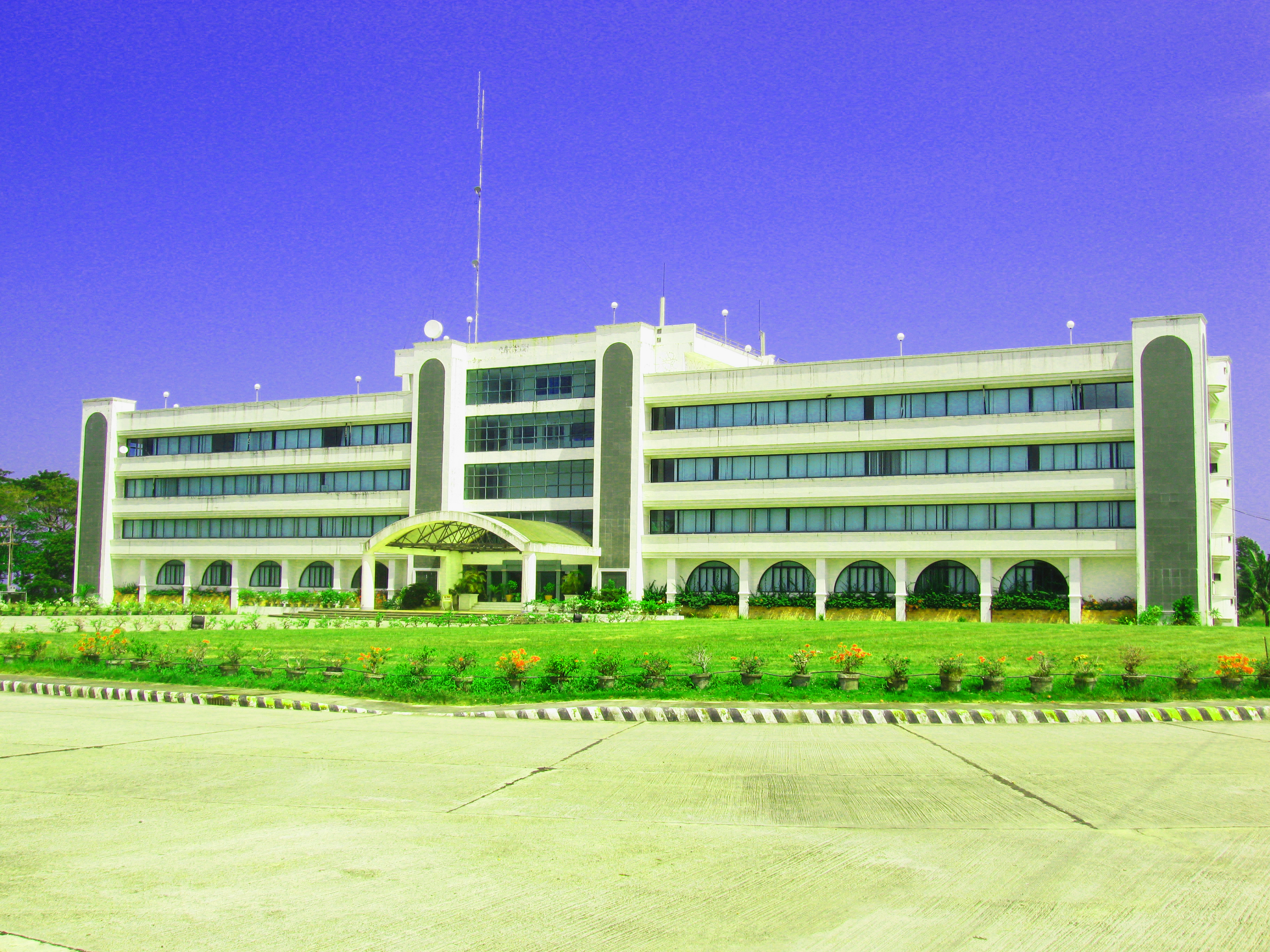
The administrative building of the Zamboanga City Special Economic Zone Authority

The Zamboanga City Special Economic Zone Authority and Freeport (ZamboEcoZone), also known as the Zamboanga Freeport Authority (ZFA), was created by virtue of Republic Act 7903 in 1995.

The Special Economic Zone was enacted into law on February 23, 1995, and made operational a year later with the appointment of a chairman and administrator and the members of the Board by former President Fidel V. Ramos. It is located about 23 km from the city proper. It is one of the three current Economic Freeport Zones outside Luzon.

=== Shopping malls ===
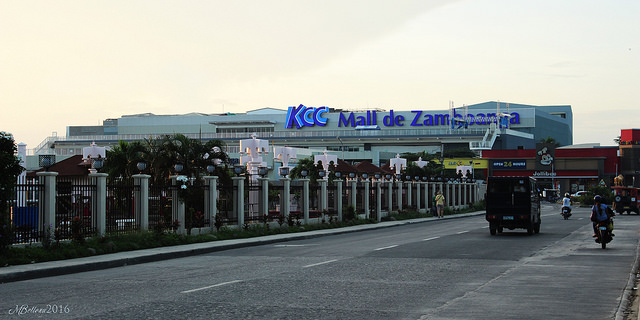
KCC Mall de Zamboanga

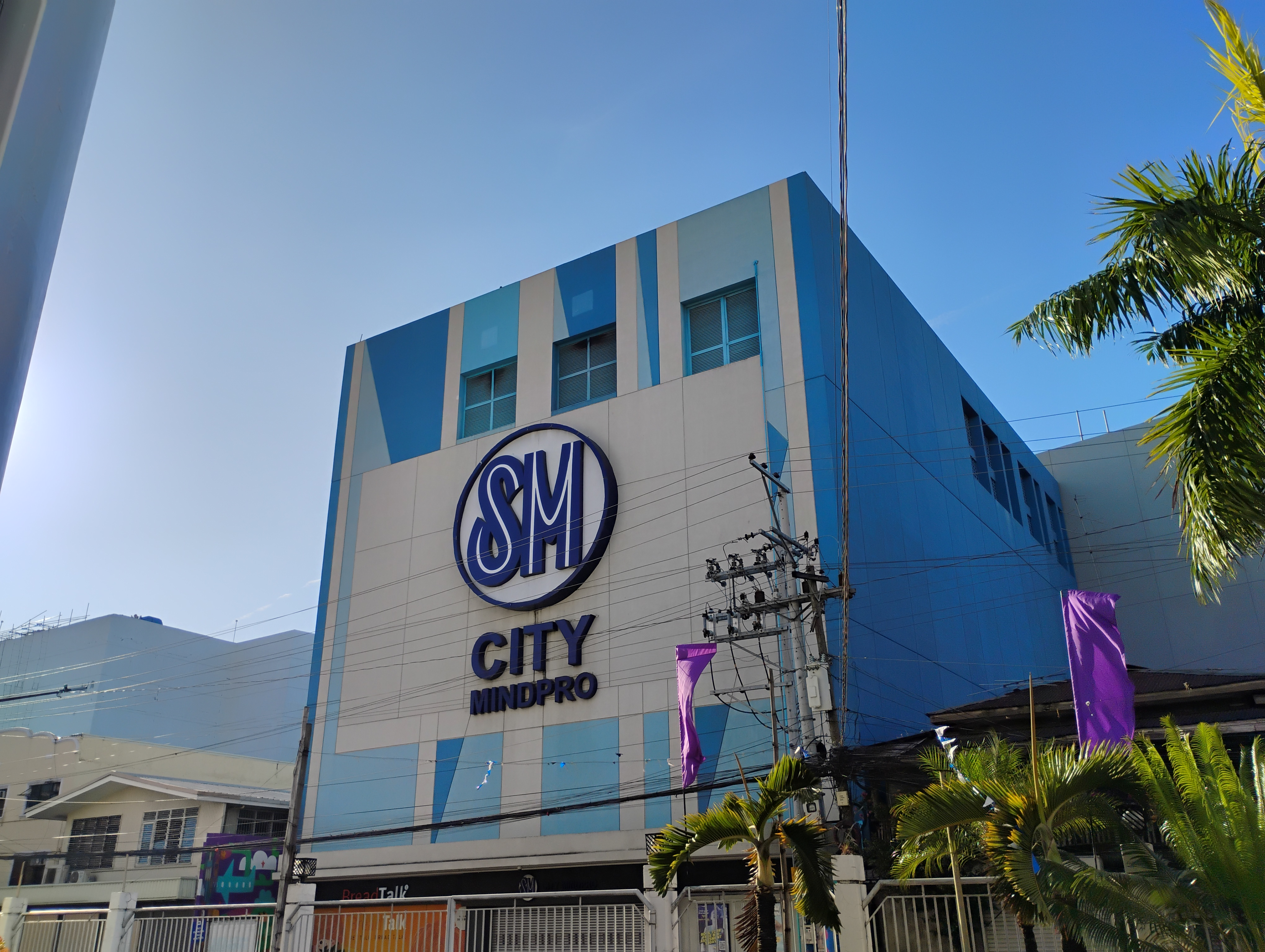
SM City Mindpro

Zamboanga City has become a new investor destination in the country for shopping malls. Several national malls have set up shop in the city, including KCC Malls, CityMalls by Double Dragon, and SM Supermalls. Some companies, such as Vista Mall, Robinsons Mall, and Ayala Malls, have also shown interest in opening branches in the city.

On December 10, 2015, KCC Malls opened their fourth branch in Zamboanga as KCC Mall de Zamboanga and it is one of the largest malls in Mindanao in terms of Gross Floor Area.

The country's largest shopping retailer, SM Supermalls, bought Mindpro Citimall in 2016, and the mall shall be converted into an SM brand. The mall now known as "SM City Mindpro" was opened to the public on December 8, 2020.

On February 23, 2023. SM Prime Holdings made a groundbreaking ceremony for the establishment of SM City Zamboanga which is the 2nd SM Mall in the City and Zamboanga Peninsula which is targeted to open by 2025. Once opened, it will become the 2nd largest mall in the region.

==== Lists of national malls in Zamboanga City (Operating/Under-construction) ====
Name	Location	Gross floor area	Opened	Status
KCC Mall de Zamboanga	Camins Avenue	162,000 m^{2}	2015	Operating
SM City Mindpro	La Purisima Street	59,383 m^{2}	2020	Operating
CityMall Tetuan	Don Alfaro Street, Tetuan	15,344 m^{2}	2015	Operating
SM City Zamboanga	Vitaliano Agan Avenue	91,000 m^{2}	2026	Operating
Grand CityMall Guiwan	MCLL Highway, Guiwan	33,401 m^{2}	2025	Under-construction

=== Seaweed industry ===
Seaweed production plants in Zamboanga City, along with Cebu and Southern Luzon, produce most of the world's supply of carrageenan. Seventy-five percent of the country's eucheuma and kappaphycus seaweed is produced mostly in the Zamboanga Peninsula and the Sulu Archipelago.

=== International trade ===
Zamboanga City is a member of East ASEAN Growth Area (BIMP-EAGA), a regional economic cooperation initiative among several Southeast Asian countries. As a result of its membership, air and sea routes have been opened between Zamboanga City and Sandakan in Malaysia. The two cities have existing trade relations and have had historical cultural interactions.

== Government ==
=== Executive ===
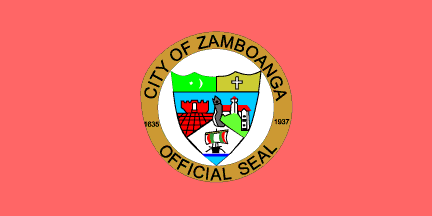
Old flag of Zamboanga

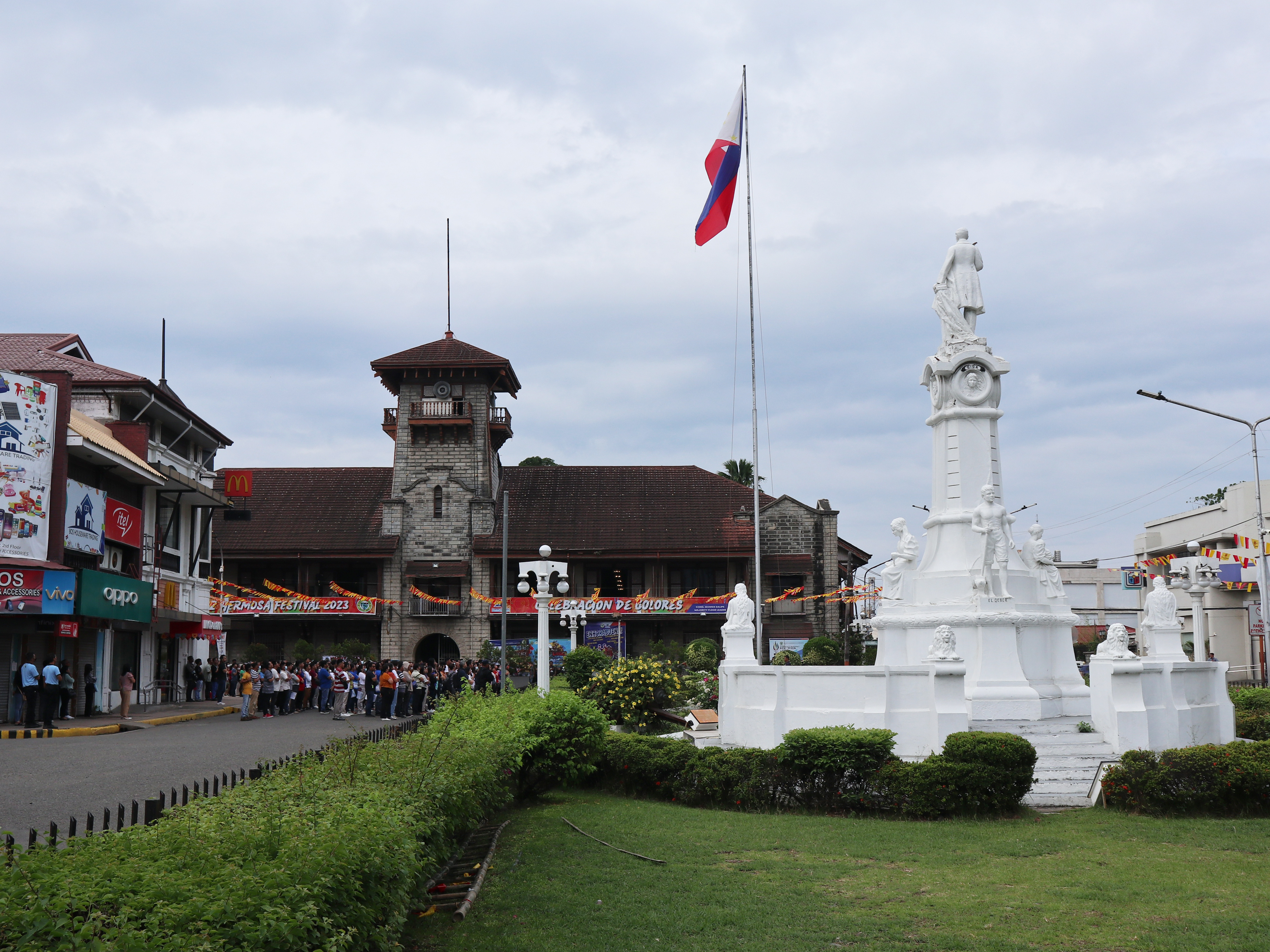
Plaza Rizal and the Zamboanga City Hall since 1907

Zamboanga City is the third-oldest city in the Philippines, with a mayor–council form of government.

The city government of Zamboanga was in a commission form between 1912 and 1914, with Christopher Frederick Bader as the appointed mayor. It was then replaced by a municipal form of government headed by a municipal mayor assisted by a municipal vice-president.

When the City Charter of Zamboanga was signed on October 12, 1936, the municipal government was converted into a city one headed by a mayor appointed by the President of the Philippine Commonwealth.

With the passage of Republic Act No. 1210 on April 29, 1955, the position of mayor became elective, and the post of vice mayor was created.

=== Representation in Congress ===
Zamboanga City received its own representation for the Philippine Congress in 1984 when the Regular Batasang Pambansa was convened. Previously, the city was part of the representation of the Zamboanga Province from 1935 to 1953, of Zamboanga del Sur from 1953 to 1972, and in Zamboanga Peninsula from 1978 to 1984.

The former lone congressional district was further divided into two separate districts: the West Coast, comprises from the City Proper to Barangay Limpapa is represented by Congresswoman Katrina R. Chua, while in the East Coast, comprises from Barangay Tetuán to Barangay Licomo is represented by Congressman Jerry Perez.

The city's population had reached 774,407 people since 2007. Under Republic Act 9269, Zamboanga City is qualified to have its third district in the House of Representatives. However, in 2008, the formation of Zamboanga City's Third District was then opposed by the local majority block of the city council.

=== Legislative ===
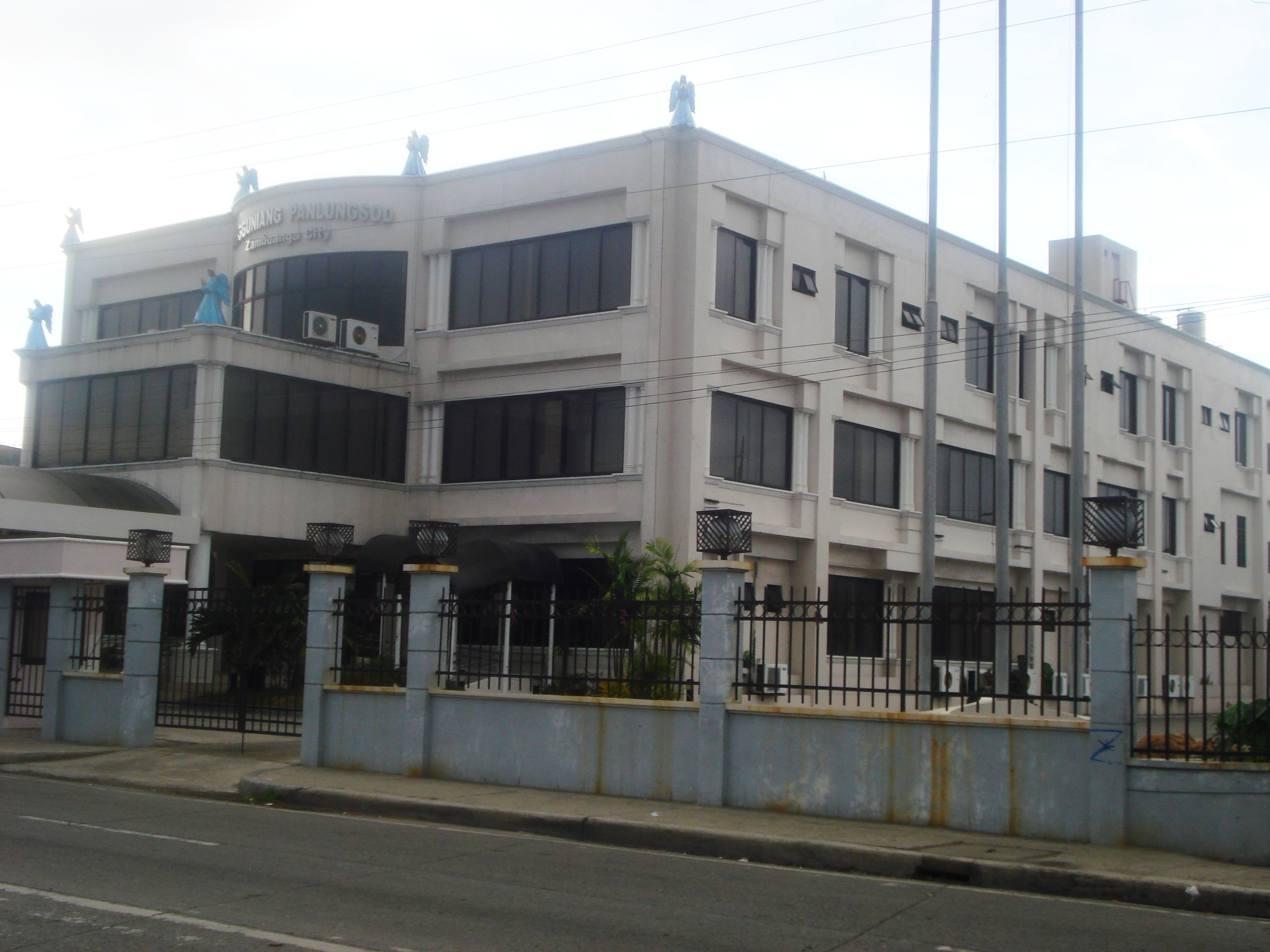
The building where the Zamboanga City Council (Sangguniang Panglungsod ng Zamboanga) holds its sessions.

The first legislative body of Zamboanga City was established in 1914, composed of councilors who represented the different districts of barrios of the then-municipality of Zamboanga.

When the City Charter of Zamboanga was signed on October 12, 1936, the municipal council was replaced by the City Council, presided over by the mayor and consisting of five councilors, the city treasurer, and the city engineer. All members are appointed by the President of the Philippine Commonwealth.

With the passage of Republic Act No. 1210 on April 29, 1955, the position of mayor became elective, and the post of vice mayor was created. The council also became elective, and its membership was increased to eight, with the vice mayor presiding.

During the Marcos regime, the city council was renamed the Sangguniang Panglungsod, and its membership was shuffled. The mayor became the presiding officer while the vice mayor became a regular member. Other representatives, such as the agriculture, business, and labor sectoral representatives, the chairman of the Kabataan Barangay Federation, and the president of the Association of Barangay Captains, were added to the council. All members of the council, except for the mayor and the vice mayor, are appointed by the President.

After Marcos was deposed, a new Local Government Code was enacted in 1991, and the mayor was restored to the executive branch. The city council organization existed since.

The current local Sangguniang Panglungsod is composed of 19 members:

- the Vice Mayor, as its presiding officer, is elected citywide;
- 8 councilors elected from the two legislative districts;
- Chairman of the Liga ng mga Barangay of the city as ex officio member;
- President of the Federasyon ng Federasyon ng Sangguniang Kabataan of the city as ex officio member; and
- Mandatory Representative of the Indigenous Peoples in Zamboanga City as an ex officio member.

=== Judiciary ===
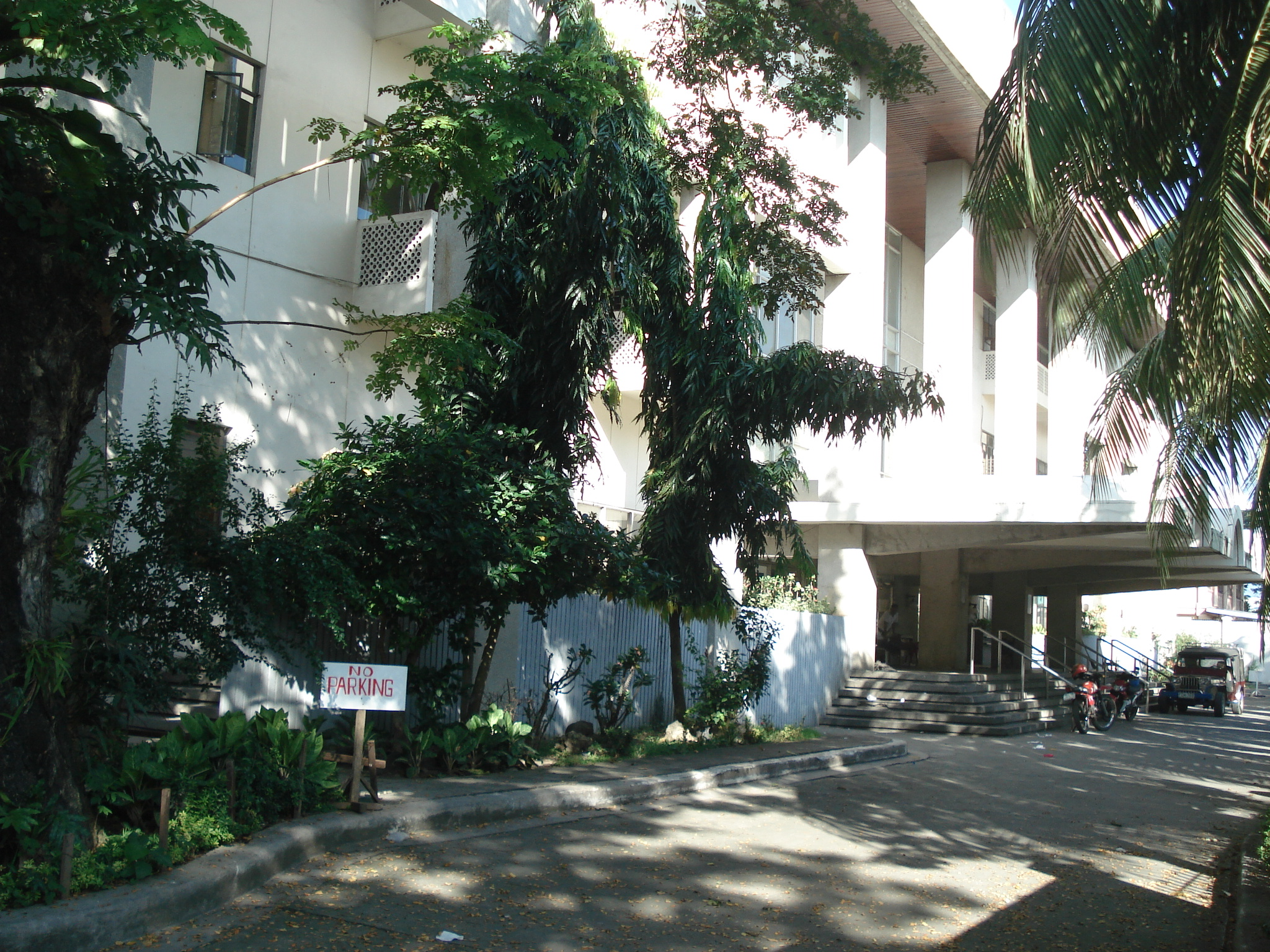
Zamboanga City Hall of Justice Building

House Bill 1455, entitled "An Act Amending Sections 14 (J) and 29 of Batas Pambansa Blg. 129, Otherwise Known as The Judiciary Reorganization Act of 1980", calls for the creation of four additional Regional Trial Court branches in the Province of Zamboanga del Sur, and the Cities of Pagadian and Zamboanga City, with an overall total of nineteen branches.

Of the 19 branches, 10 seats shall be for Zamboanga City, and the remaining seats for Pagadian City, Molave, San Miguel, Ipil, and Aurora.

=== Armed forces and law enforcement ===
Zamboanga City hosts a large number of military, police, and coast guard bases in the country. The Edwin Andrews Air Base hosts the Air Force unit in the city, which is located at the Zamboanga International Airport complex. The Camp General Basilio Navarro in Upper Calarian, is the main operating base of the Western Mindanao Command (WestMinCom). WesMinCom is one of the unified commands of the Armed Forces of the Philippines that serves the Western Mindanao. The Coast Guard District Southwestern Mindanao is located near the Camp General Basilio Navarro, while a coast guard station is located inside the Port of Zamboanga. Zamboanga City also hosts Bureau of Corrections' San Ramon Prison and Penal Farm, which is one of the oldest penitentiaries in the country.

== Transportation ==
=== Air ===
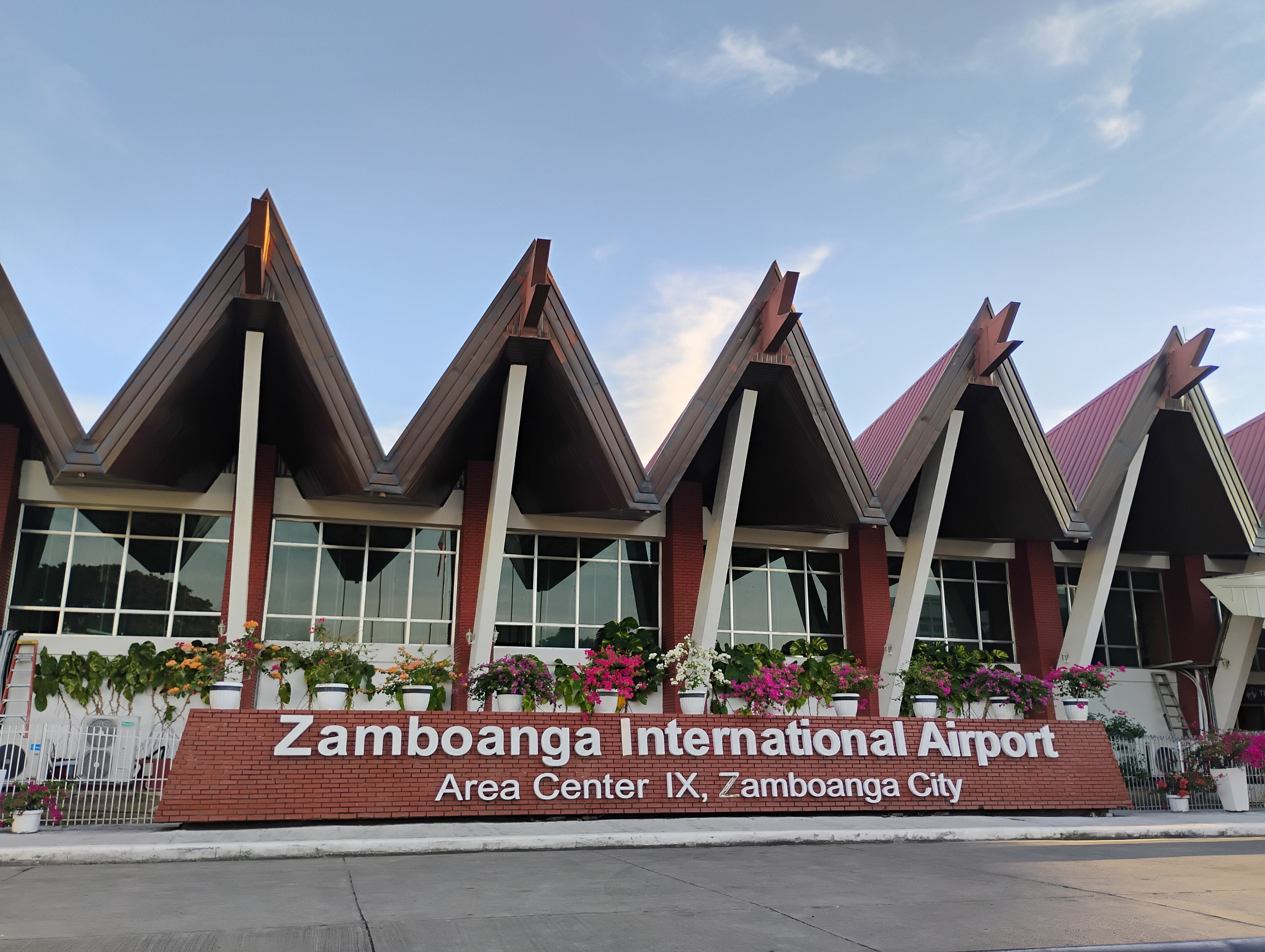
Zamboanga International Airport

The Zamboanga International Airport is located in Barangay Canelar. It has a 2,610-meter primary runway and can serve international flights and bigger planes such as the C-17 Globemaster III, Antonov An-124, Airbus A330, and Boeing 747. The government has already earmarked more than 240 million pesos to complete the rehabilitation of the existing facilities of the airport, which was ranked the tenth-busiest in the Philippines in 2008.

The city's new airport is being proposed in Barangays Mercedes and Talabaan to replace the existing one in Barangay Canelar. The current airport site is also envisioned as a business district.

=== Land ===
The primary modes of transportation within the city are serviced by taxis, jeepneys, tricycles, and bajaj/piaggios There are several bus routes within the city. Other smaller bus companies ply the routes to neighboring municipalities in the Zamboanga del Norte and Zamboanga Sibugay areas. Since June 25, 2018, taxis have been launched with an initial 13 units, growing to 50. By 2019, there will be 100 taxi units operating in and around Zamboanga City, serving any point in Region 9, and the operators say they will surely add more until reaching the maximum of 200 taxi units.

=== Sea ===
Zamboanga City has 19 seaports and wharves, 12 of which are privately owned and the rest are government-owned. This includes some ports in Basilan, which are registered under the Zamboanga City port management. The largest and most modern seaport is the government-operated main port in Zamboanga City, which can accommodate up to 20 ships at any given time. There are 25 shipping companies whose vessels regularly dock at the port of Zamboanga. The city also has fastcraft services to Sandakan, Malaysia, and a shipping cargo company from Vietnam that serves routes to and from Zamboanga City to deliver goods from Vietnam.

In 2002, the Port of Zamboanga City, including the area ports of Basilan, registered 5.57 million passenger movement, surpassing Batangas by 1.3 million passengers, and Manila by over 1.59 million passengers.

On May 28, 2009, the PHP700 million port expansion project, funded by the national government was inaugurated by President Gloria Macapagal Arroyo.

== Infrastructure ==
=== Townships ===
SR Township is based on a 90-hectare area in Boalan, currently in its first phase, dedicating 50 hectares of land to the construction of the Biggest Mosque in the Philippines, known as the "Grand Sadik Mosque". Also part of phase 1 is the establishment of a mall, a convention center, and a hotel.

The township of Andaluz by Vista Estates, located on Boalan's diversion road, is a 32-hectare township that promises to replicate the lifestyle of Seville, Spain. The Township hosts a subdivision, a leisure and commercial district that prides itself on being the future "Central Business District" of the Zamboanga Peninsula.

Andaluz is also the first township developed by Vista Estates in Mindanao.

=== Telecommunication ===
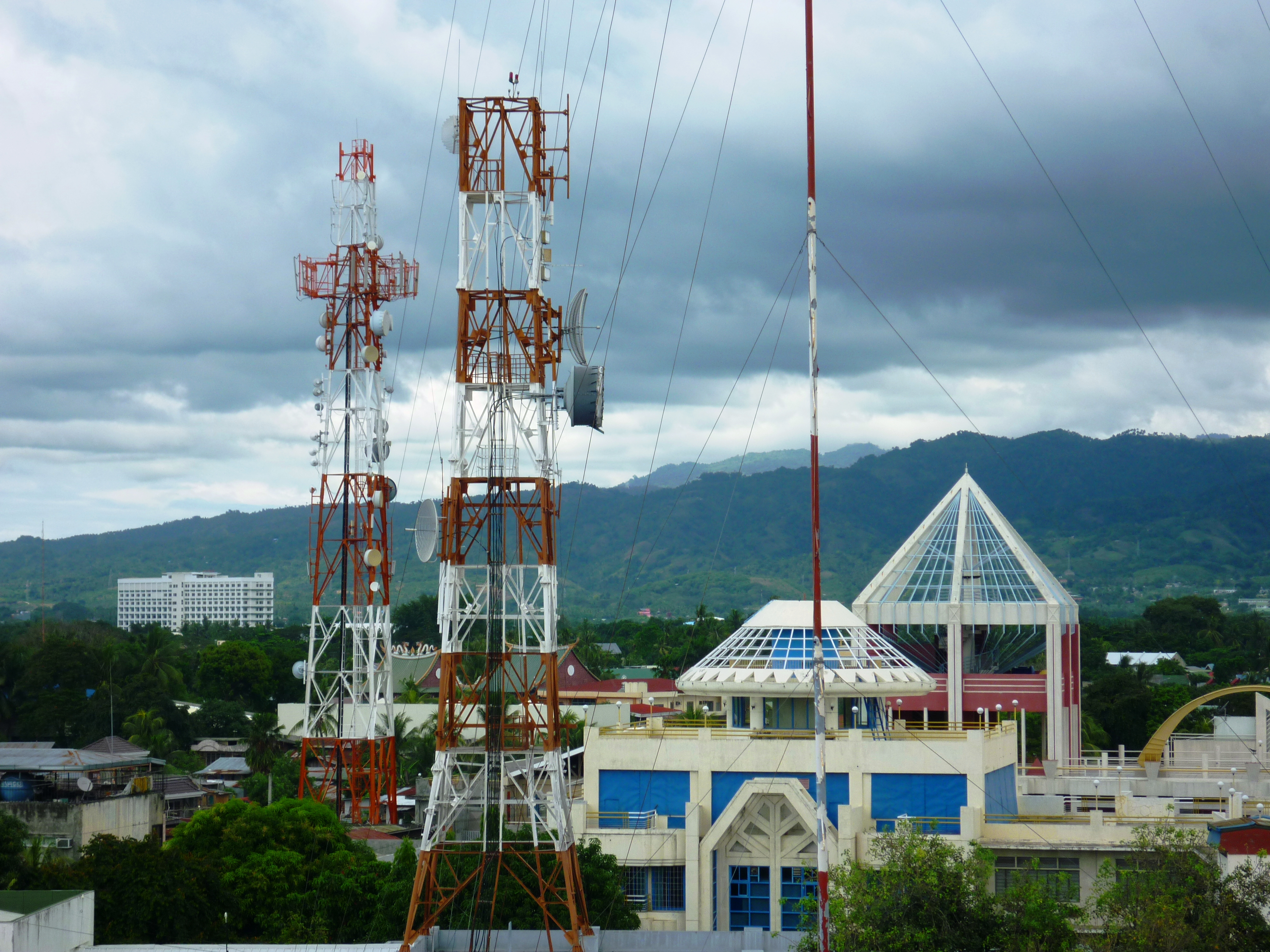
The telecommunication towers as can be seen over the downtown.

Major telecommunications firm, Philippine Long Distance Telephone Company, maintains operations in the city. Mabuhay Satellite Corporation and DITO have established a facility in Zamboanga City to improve the existing communications infrastructure. InfiniVAN Inc, with its partnership with Eastern Telecommunications and Globe Telecom, owns the Philippine Domestic Submarine Cable Network (PDSCN) in which they have Zamboanga City as one of their landing stations.

=== Power ===
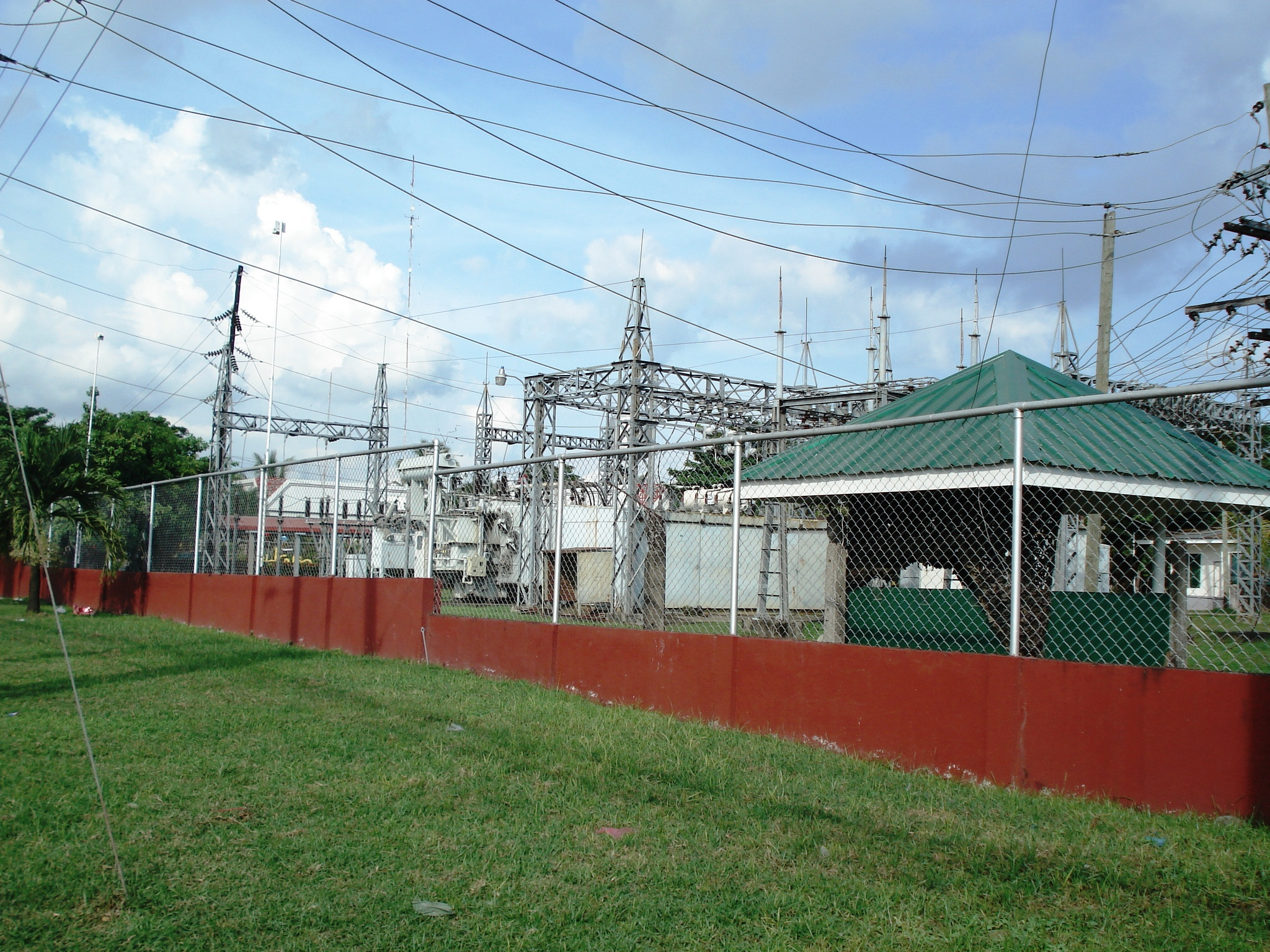
Murga Station of the Zamboanga City Electric Cooperative (ZAMCELCO).

The Zamboanga City Electric Cooperative is the franchise holder of electric power distribution covering the entire city.

Conrado Alcantara and Sons Holdings (Conal) constructed a coal-fired power plant with an initial capacity of 105 megawatts on a 60-hectare land inside the Zamboanga City Special Economic Zone Authority. The plant was originally scheduled to open in 2014, with the constructors expecting to meet the city's electricity demand by that year. However, the project was delayed and had begun construction by the end of 2017. The plant is expected to be fully operational by 2020.

=== Water ===
Zamboanga City relies heavily on surface water from the Tumaga River for its water supply. The Zamboanga City Water District (ZCWD) is serving only 48% of the total population with its water production; 38% is accounted for by water. Given the projected population and the fact that the city is highly urbanizing, it is likely that future water requirements will not be met unless other sources, such as rivers and springs, are tapped to augment the water supply.

ZCWD has 24 production wells. These are located in the following strategic areas within the city, producing 1,304 m^{3} daily.

=== Health ===
There are several medical centers and hospitals in Zamboanga. The Zamboanga Peninsula Medical Center is the city's newest hospital, which was opened in 2015. It is regarded as one of the largest and most modern in the region, likened to the St. Luke's Medical Center. The government-operated Zamboanga City Medical Center was founded in 1918 as the Zamboanga City General Hospital. The Brent Hospital and Colleges, Inc. was founded on February 2, 1914, by Charles Henry Brent, the first Protestant Episcopal missionary bishop in the Philippines. Today, it operates a school within its compound, offering nursing and allied health courses.

The Zamboanga City Red Cross chapter was established on June 17, 1946, and was originally known as the Zamboanga City Chapter. The original Zamboanga City Chapter comprised the city of Zamboanga and the three provinces of Basilan, Zamboanga del Norte and Zamboanga del Sur.

West Metro Medical Center is a secondary-level private hospital in Zamboanga City, Philippines. As of 2015, the hospital has a capacity of 110 beds. Ongoing construction of an annex is to increase bed capacity to 190, making it the largest private hospital in the Zamboanga Peninsula and Archipelago.

In 2006, the Military Sealift Command (MSC) hospital ship, USNS Mercy (T-AH-19), anchored off the coast of Zamboanga City, to provide medical, dental and veterinary care for the people of the city.

=== Sports and recreation facilities ===
Convention centers that host several events and congregations include the Garden Orchid Hotel's Convention Center, Palacio del Sur, Centro Latino, Astoria Regency, and Patio Palmeras. KCC Mall de Zamboanga also has its convention halls that is located at its East Wing.

Sport venues in Zamboanga City include the Joaquin F. Enriquez Memorial Sports Complex, the Universidad de Zamboanga Summit Center, Southern City Colleges Citadel Sports Arena, and the Mayor Vitaliano D. Agan Coliseum.

== Education ==
Ateneo de Zamboanga University façade

There exist numerous public and private schools throughout the city. The Western Mindanao State University is a state-run university. Sectarian schools include the Ateneo de Zamboanga University. There are also some foreign schools with study programs. Other universities in the city include the Universidad de Zamboanga, Southern City Colleges, Pilar College, AMA Computer College, Zamboanga Peninsula Polytechnic State University, and Zamboanga State College of Marine Sciences and Technology, National University (Philippines), Zamboanga plan.

== Culture ==
=== Cuisine ===
Reflecting its creole heritage, Zamboangeno cuisine draws influences from many regions of the Philippines and beyond.

Dishes unique to Zamboanga City include:

- Curacha Alavar: steamed or boiled spanner crabs (curacha) cooked with garlic, ginger, and salt, and doused in a sauce blend of coconut milk (gata), crab fat (taba ng talangka), and various spices called Alavar—a specialty of Alavar Seafood Restaurant.
- Chupa kulo: cooked mangrove snails (bagungon) simmered in a sauce blend of coconut milk, squash, ferns (pako), and various spices—a specialty of Santa Cruz Island.
- Paella zamboangueña:
- Knickerbocker:

Additionally, Tausug and Sama cuisine are ubiquitous throughout the city.

=== Maritime ===
The vinta or lepa-lepa is the traditional sailboat of the Moro and Sama-Bajau peoples of western Mindanao and the Sulu Archipelago, characterized by a canoe-like central hull and a dual outrigger, a lug sail, and, traditionally, an intricately carved prow. The present-day vinta is mostly a small, one to three-person craft. Still, in the past, there were larger versions of the boat, with an onboard shelter and plenty of storage, similar to the larger Polynesian outriggers, that traveled greater distances. Around Zamboanga and Santa Cruz Island, these boats are famous for their wildly colorful, quilt-like sails.

On special occasions - most notably the month-long Zamboanga Hermosa Festival, also known as Fiesta Pilar - these boats can be seen out in force with these festival sails on full display. The Regatta de Zamboanga, usually held on the Sunday before the feast day of Zamboanga Hermosa, is a government-sponsored vinta race, along the seaside thoroughfare of Cawa-Cawa Boulevard (presently known as R.T. Lim Boulevard).

The vinta has become obsolete with the introduction of fuel-powered motors in the late 20th century. They have become an uncommon sight in the region, but remain the highlight of festivals, when the colorful sailboats can be seen in their full splendor.

=== Media ===
Zamboanga City has 26 radio stations (9 AM & 17 FM). There are also 17 regular television stations and three cable television stations. Several local publications operate in the various parts of the city and nearby provinces and regions, such as The Daily Zamboanga Times, The Mindanao Examiner Regional Newspaper, Voz de Mindanao, Zamboanga Peninsula Journal, Zamboanga Star, Zamboanga Today, 'Diario Verdad, The Zamboanga Post, and Zamboanga Forum.

== Tourism ==
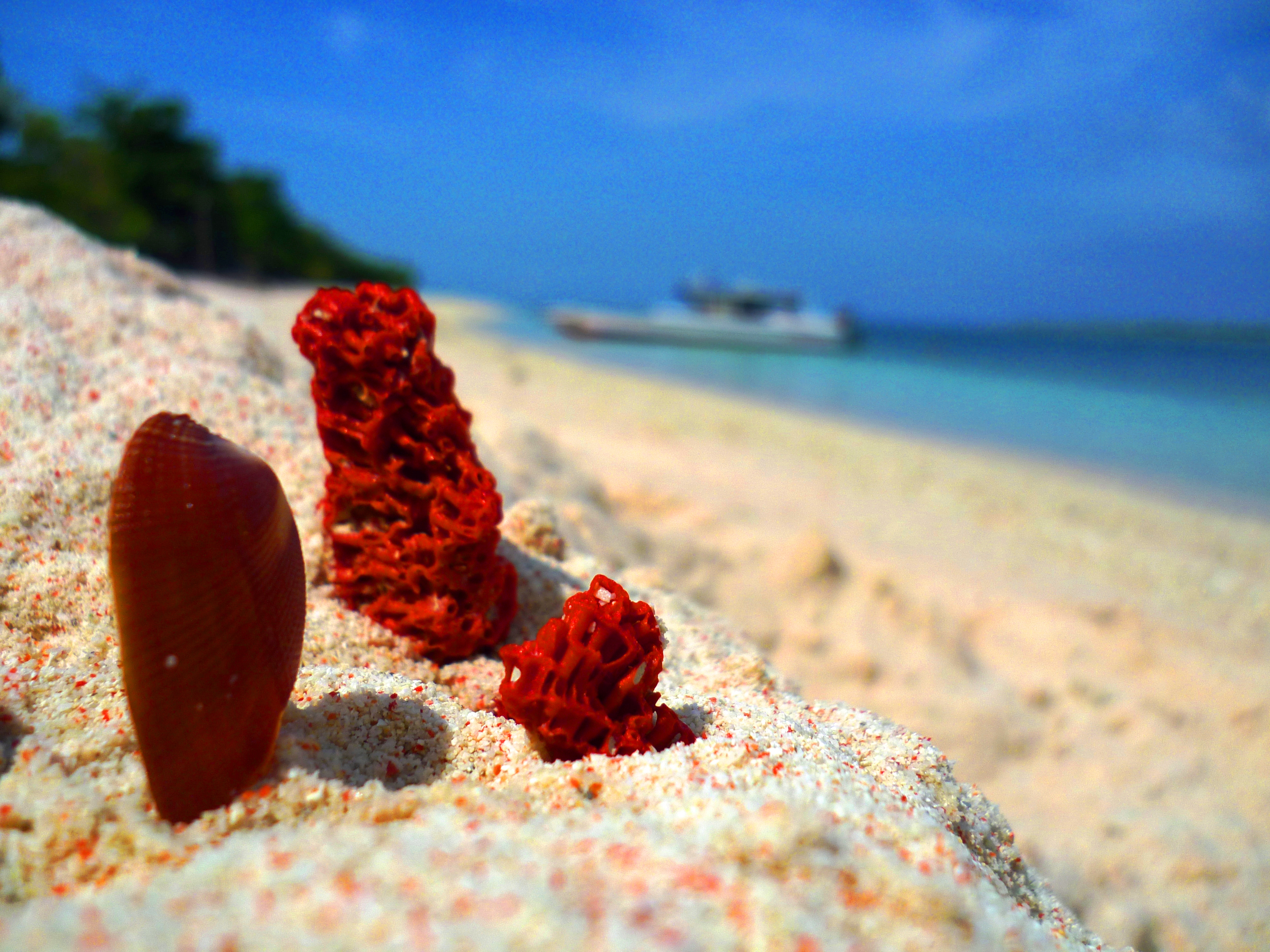
Pulverized Red Organ Pipe Corals gives that pinkish tint on Santa Cruz's Beach.

The Department of Tourism has selected Zamboanga City as a flagship tourism destination in Zamboanga Peninsula. Domestic and foreign tourist arrivals increased 8 percent to 439,160 in 2005, according to data from the regional tourism office. The same report notes that Filipinos accounted for 80 percent of the tourist arrivals. Moreover, 50 percent of those tourists had visited the city before.

Zamboanga City's famous Pink Sand Beach of Santa Cruz was recognized by the National Geographic as one of the "World's 21 Best Beaches" in 2018. A surge in tourist arrivals was recorded in 2018 that hit almost 100,000. A day-trip to the island includes a hop to Little Santa Cruz's long white sand bar and a tour of the island's lagoon, known for its rich ecosystem.

Another rising tourist hub is the newly opened 11 Islands (commonly called Onçe Islas), a group of islands with white-sand beaches and sand bars located on the city's east coast.

The whole Zamboanga Peninsula Region recorded 723,455 tourist arrivals in 2018, of which 11,190 were foreigners, 10,523 Overseas Filipino Workers (OFWs), and 701,742 were domestic tourists, according to the Department of Tourism.

== Notable personalities ==
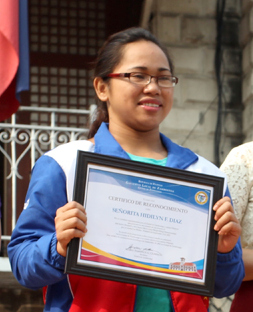
Hidilyn Diaz at her homecoming to Zamboanga City, days after her victory in the 2016 Summer Olympics

- Eumir Marcial – Filipino Boxer. Won a bronze medal in the 2020 Summer Olympics, and has 4 Gold Medals in the South East Asian Games
- Mike Tolomia – basketball player
- Cesar Climaco - mayor of Zamboanga City for 11 years over three nonconsecutive terms. A prominent critic of the martial law regime of Ferdinand Marcos.
- Roseller T. Lim – the first Zamboangueño who became a Philippine senator from December 30, 1955, to December 30, 1963. Lim was known as the "Great Filibuster", after he filibustered for more than 18 hours in an attempt to prevent the election of Ferdinand Marcos as president of the Senate.
- Alyssa Alano – a Filipina-Australian film and TV actress. She was a former member of the popular Viva Hotbabes franchise.
- Hidilyn Diaz – a Filipina weightlifter and airwoman. She won the silver medal in the 2016 Summer Olympics women's 53-kg weight division. In Tokyo on July 26, 2021, Diaz won the Philippines' first Olympic gold medal at the 2020 Summer Olympics for women's weightlifting, setting the Olympic record for the 55 kg category
- Buddy Zabala – a Filipino musician and producer. He was the bassist of the Filipino punk rock band Hilera and is currently in Moonstar88 and Cambio. He was also a member of Eraserheads and bassist for The Dawn.
- Anton Mari H. Lim – a Filipino veterinarian, businessman, public figure, and humanitarian.
- Andy Mark C. Barroca – a Filipino professional basketball player for the Magnolia Hotshots in the Philippine Basketball Association (PBA).
- Ryan Roose B. "RR" Garcia – a Filipino professional basketball player for the TNT KaTropa in the PBA.
- Rudy Briones Lingganay Jr. – another Filipino professional basketball player for the TNT KaTropa in the PBA.
- Chico Lanete – a Filipino professional basketball player for the Phoenix Fuel Masters in the PBA.
- Chef Miggy Cabel Moreno - Celebrated Filipino Tausug chef and restaurateur recognized for championing the culinary heritage of Southern Mindanao, specifically Tausug cuisine.
- Gloria Tan Climaco – the first female Chair and Managing Partner of auditing firm Sycip Gorres & Velayo (SGV) from 1996 to 1999. She graduated magna cum laude from Ateneo de Zamboanga in 1975 with an accountancy degree.
- Ruru Madrid - is a Filipino actor, singer, model, and host who rose to fame in Protégé.
- Yong Muhajil - is a Teen Housemate in Pinoy Big Brother 7's Teen Chapter, who later became part of the Dream Team.
- Christian Morones - is a teen housemate in Pinoy Big Brother 7. He's dubbed as the Courtside Kusinero of Zamboanga.
- Cheska Fausto - Charming young starlet who was introduced to the entertainment industry as a member of Sparkada, the newest assemblage of the Sparkle Network's up-and-coming young talent.

== Sister cities ==
Zamboanga City is twinned with the following cities:

Local
- Davao City, Davao del Sur
- Baguio, Benguet
- Makati, Metro Manila
- San Mateo, Rizal
- Cagayan de Oro, Misamis Oriental
- Gumaca, Quezon

International
- Pekanbaru, Indonesia
- Sandakan, Malaysia
- Zaragoza, Spain
- Zhoushan, China

== See also ==
- Cagayan de Oro
- Davao City
- General Santos
- Cotabato City
