= Once Islas =

Philippine eco-cultural tourism attraction

Coordinates: 7°08′57″N 122°15′49″E

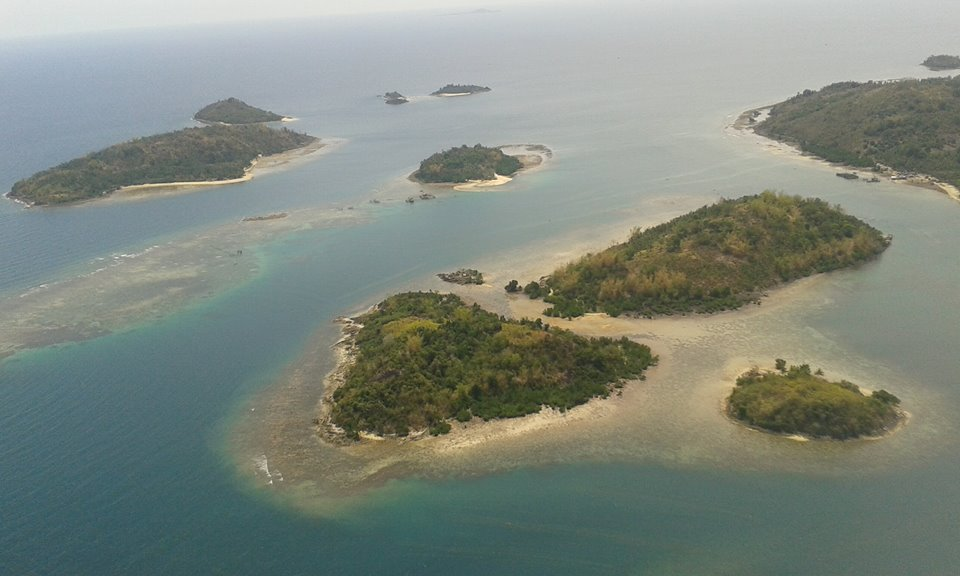
- Interactive map of Once Islas

Geography
- Archipelago: Mindanao

Administration
- Philippines
- Region: Zamboanga Peninsula
- Province: Zamboanga del Sur
- City: Zamboanga City
- Barangays: Dita; Panubigan

Demographics
- Ethnic groups: Banguingui

Once Islas is an eco-cultural tourism attraction in Zamboanga City, Philippines, consisting of eleven small islands, which opened in July 2018. Four of the eleven islands are open to the public. The islands are managed by the Banguingui people. The name "Once Islas", meaning 'eleven islands' is in the Chavacano language.

The islands open to tourists are Baung-Baung, Bisaya-Bisaya, Buh-Buh and Sirommon, and the others are Baguias, Kabugan, Lambang-Lambang, Lampinigan, Panganak, Sallangan and Simaddang.

== Location and appearance ==
The islands are located within the boundaries of the barangays Panubigan and Dita, an hour from mainland Zamboanga. The islands contain rock formations, with white-sand beaches. Sirommon Island also contains multiple sandbars.

== Travel ==
Going to the Zamboanga City Provincial Bus Terminal, you can take a north-bound bus, going from there, you land at the Panubigan Crossing. After, it is recommended to register at the barangay hall before going to the port and taking a boat to the islands.
