= Zamboanga Peninsula =

Administrative region of the Philippines

Zamboanga Peninsula Península de Zamboanga Lawis sa Zamboanga
- Region
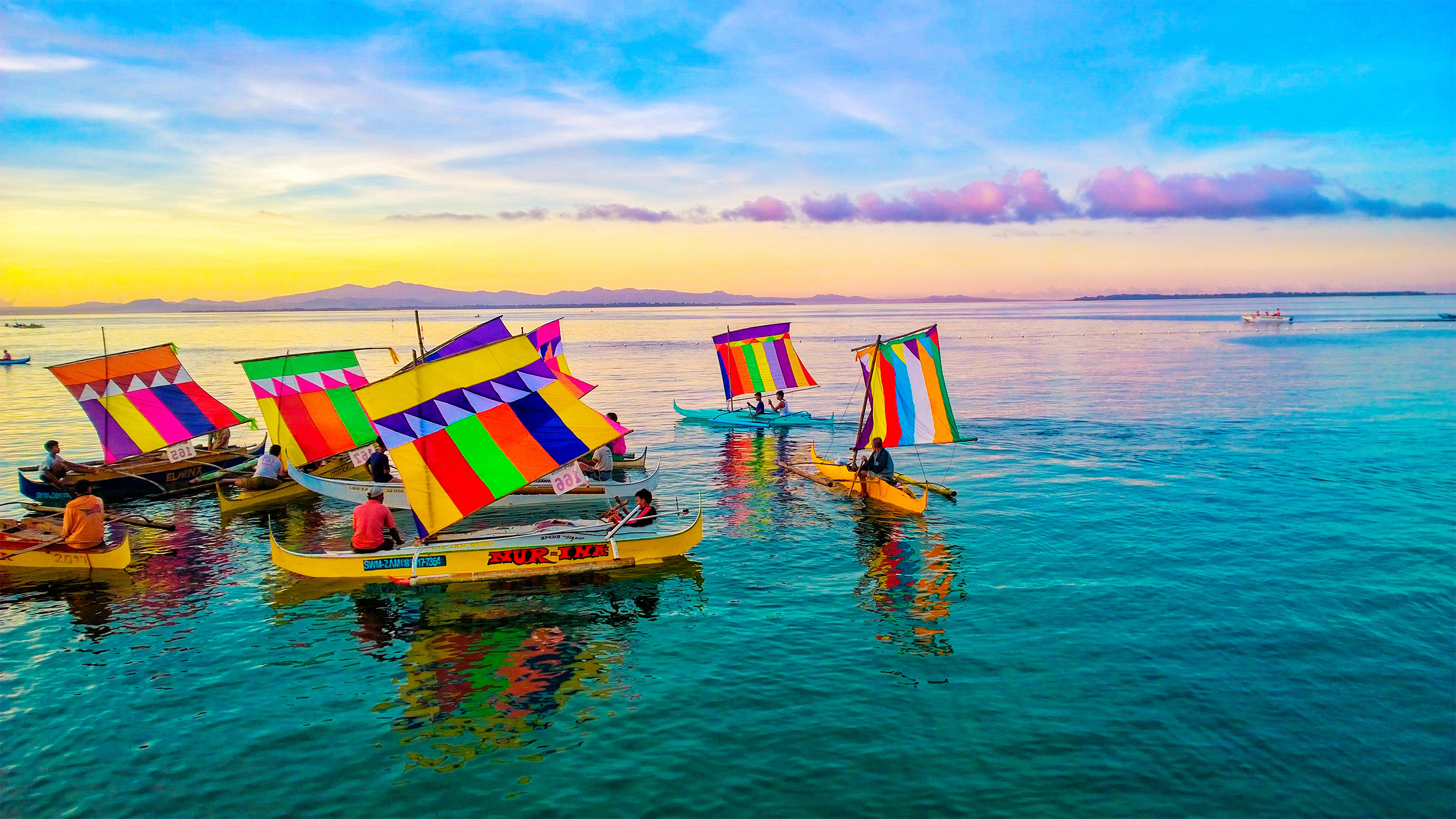
- Vintas of Zamboanga
- Anthem: Our Eden Land
- Location in the Philippines
- Interactive map of Zamboanga Peninsula
- Coordinates: 7°50′N 122°25′E
- Country: Philippines
- Island group: Mindanao
- Regional center: Pagadian
- Largest city: Zamboanga City

Area
  - Total: 17,056.73 km^{2} (6,585.64 sq mi)
- Highest elevation (Mount Pinukis): 1,532 m (5,026 ft)

Population (2024 census)
  - Total: 3,943,837
  - Density: 231.2188/km^{2} (598.8540/sq mi)
  - Households: 895,899
- Demonym(s): Zamboangueño, Samboanganon

Divisions
  - Provinces: 4: Sulu; Zamboanga del Norte; Zamboanga del Sur; Zamboanga Sibugay
  - Independent cities: 1: Zamboanga City
  - Component cities: 4: Dapitan; Dipolog; Isabela City; Pagadian
  - Municipalities: 86
  - Barangays: 2,314
  - Districts: 10

Economy
  - Poverty incidence: 9.8% (2025)
  - GDP total: US$10.2 billion
  - GDP per capita: US$2,525
  - HDI (2023): 0.683 medium · 16th of 17
- Time zone: UTC+8 (PST)
- PSGC: 090000000
- ISO 3166 code: PH-09
- Electorate: 2,869,368 voters (2025)
- Languages: Cebuano; Chavacano; Maguindanaon; Sama; Subanon; Tagalog; Tausug; Yakan; English; Spanish

Zamboanga Peninsula (Cebuano: Lawis sa Zamboanga; Chavacano/Spanish: Península de Zamboanga; Filipino: Tangway ng Zamboanga), designated as Region IX, is an administrative region in Mindanao, Philippines. It consists of the provinces of Sulu, Zamboanga del Norte, Zamboanga Sibugay and Zamboanga del Sur, and the cities of Isabela and Zamboanga.

The region was previously known as Western Mindanao. Pagadian serves as the regional center, while Zamboanga City is the region's commercial and industrial center.

== Etymology ==
The name of Zamboanga is the Hispanicized spelling of the Sinama term for "mooring place" - samboangan (also spelled sambuangan; and in Subanen, sembwangan), from the root word samboang ("mooring pole"). "Samboangan" was the original name of Zamboanga City, from where the name of the peninsula is derived from. "Samboangan" is well-attested in Spanish, British, French, German, and American historical records from as far back as the 17th century.

This is commonly contested by folk etymologies which instead attribute the name of Zamboanga to the Indonesian word jambangan (claimed to mean "place of flowers", but actually means "pot" or "bowl"), usually with claims that all ethnic groups in Zamboanga were "Malays". However, this name has never been attested in any historical records prior to the 1960s.

== History ==
=== Ancient era ===
During the ancient era, the Zamboanga peninsula was a vast territory home to various ethnic groups, the largest of which was the Subanen people. Later, the southern coastal areas of the region came under the influence of the Javanese Majapahit Empire, though it was never formally conquered.

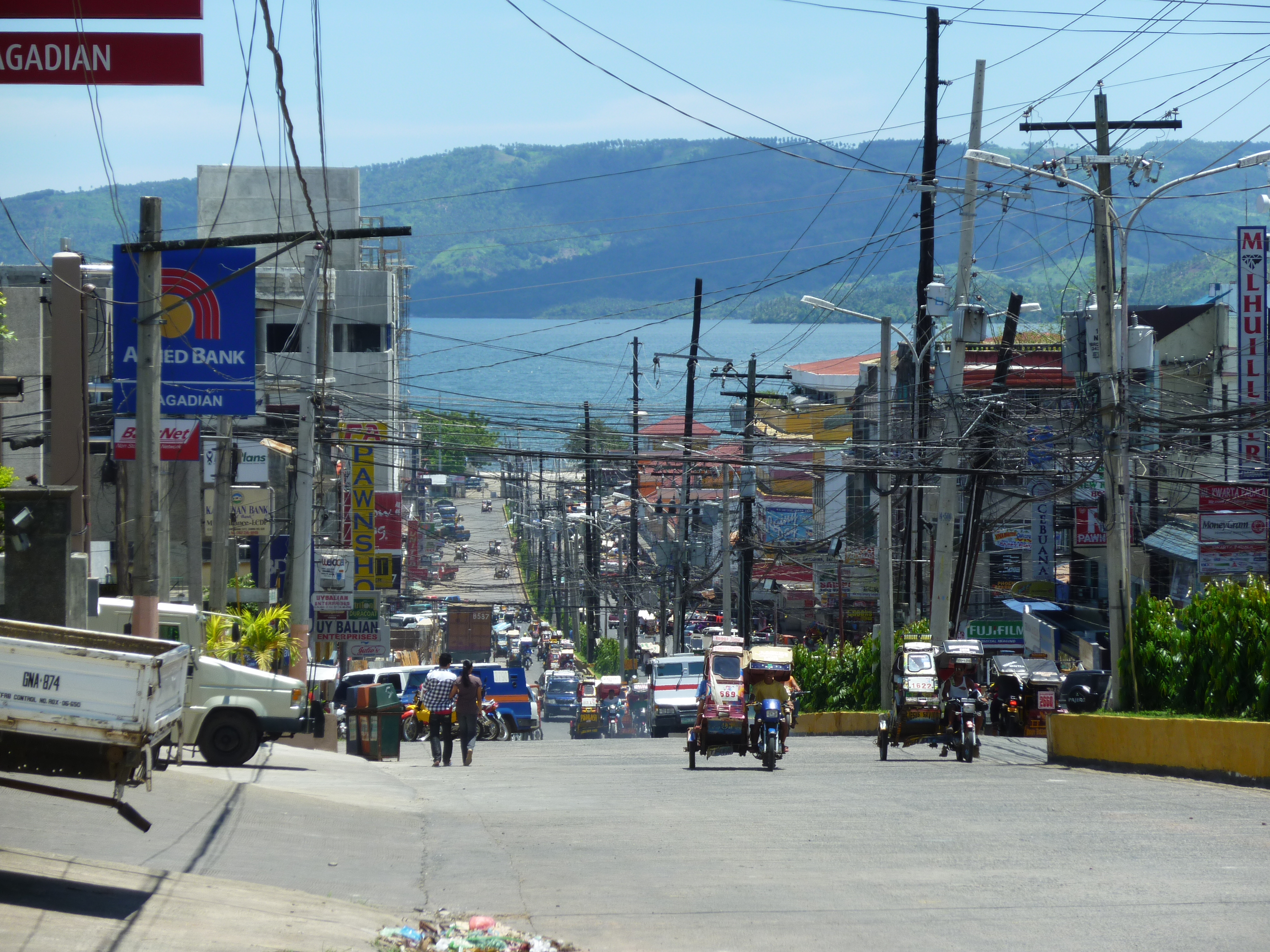
A view of Pagadian as seen in September 2010

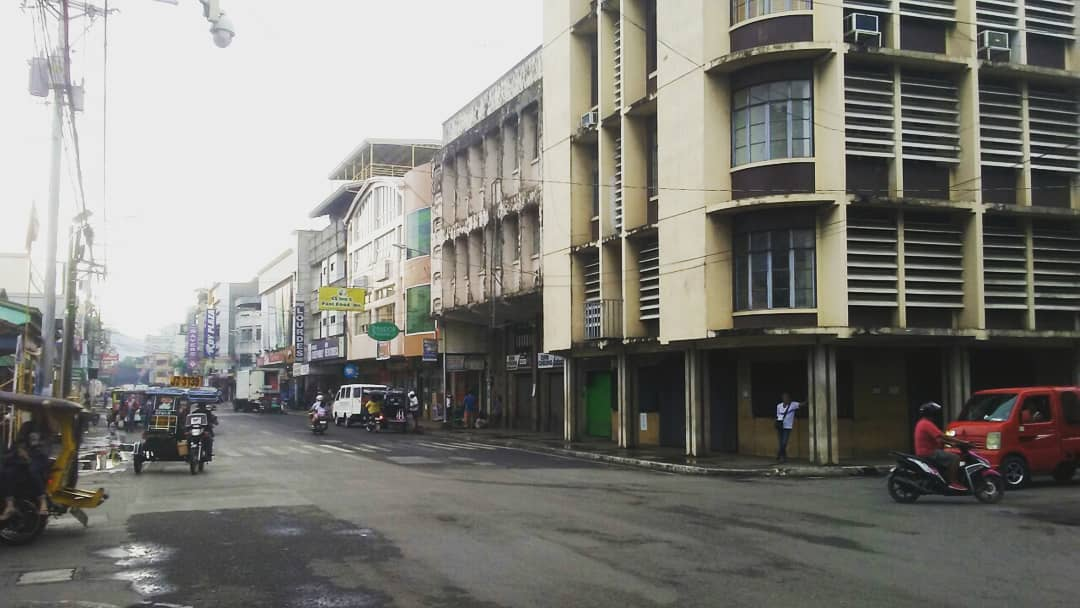
A view of downtown Dipolog as seen in October 2019

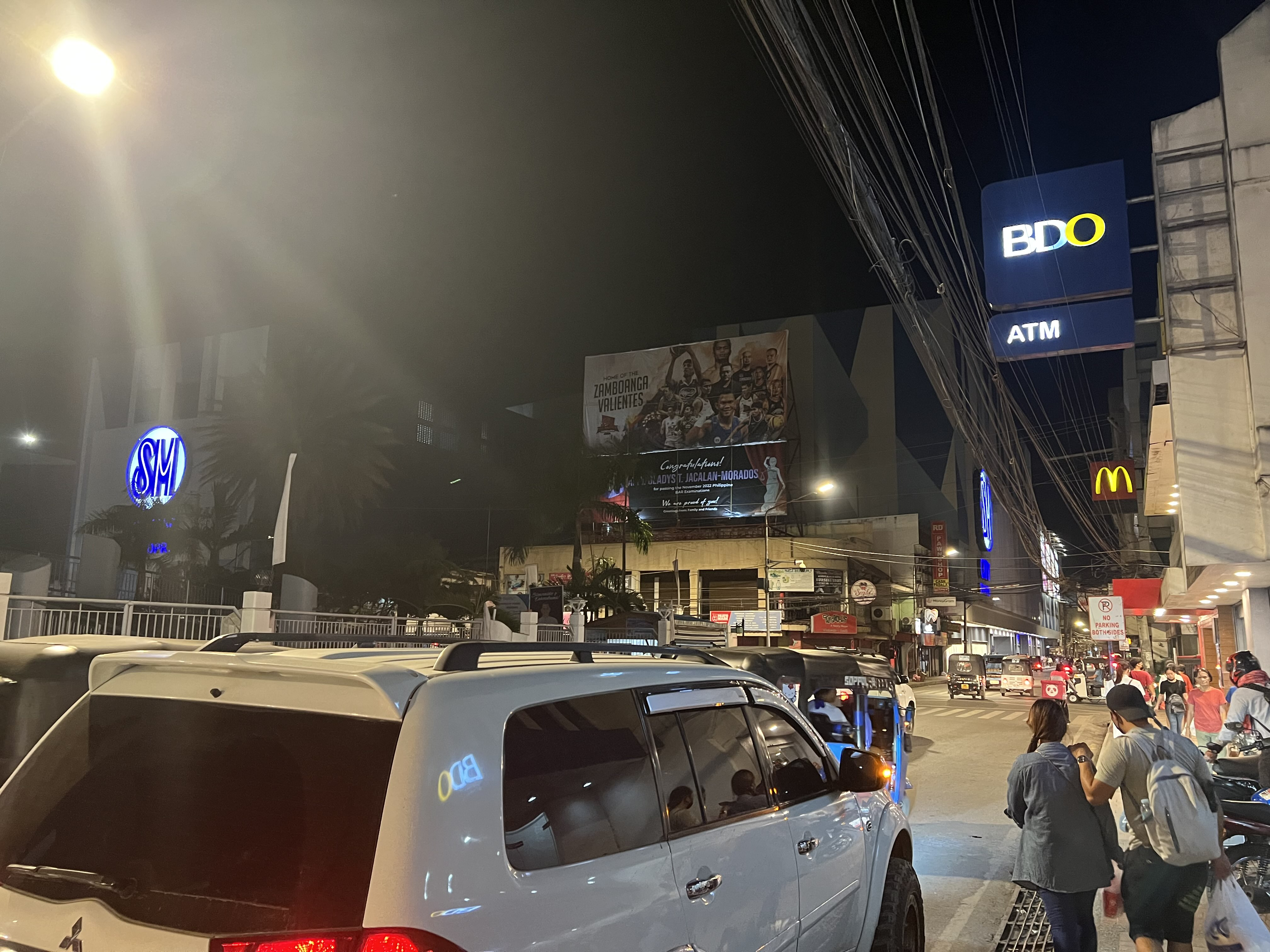
A view of downtown Zamboanga at Night in May 2023

=== Rajahnate of Sanmalan ===
The 11th-century Chinese Song dynasty records also mention a polity named "Sanmalan" (三麻蘭) from Mindanao, which has a name similar to Zamboanga and has been tentatively identified with it by some authors (Wang, 2008; Huang, 1980). Sanmalan is said to be led by a Rajah "Chülan". His ambassador "Ali Bakti" and that of Butuan's "Likan-hsieh" is recorded to have visited the Chinese imperial court with gifts and trade goods in AD 1011. However, the correlation between Zamboanga and Sanmalan is based only on their similar-sounding names. Sanmalan is only mentioned in conjunction with Butuan (P'u-tuan) and it is unknown if Sanmalan is indeed Zamboanga. The historian William Henry Scott (1989) also posits the possibility that Sanmalan instead referred to a polity of the Sama-Bajau ("Samal") people.

During the 13th century, the Tausūg people began migrating to the Zamboanga Peninsula and the Sulu Archipelago from their homelands in northeastern Mindanao. They became the dominant ethnic group in the archipelago after they were Islamized in the 14th century and established the Sultanate of Sulu in the 15th century. A majority of the Yakan, the Balanguingui, and the Sama-Bajau were also Islamized, though most of the Subanen remained animist (with the exception of the Kolibugan subgroup in southwestern Zamboanga).

=== Sultanate of Maguindanao era ===
In the 14th century, the Sultanate of Sulu ruled the southwestern sections of the peninsula. By the late 15th century and early 16th century, Malay missionaries further spread Islam in the southern Philippines. Sharif Kabungsuwan, a Johore-born missionary of Malay and Arab descent established the Sultanate of Maguindanao, which the entire island of Mindanao is named after. The sultanate also occupied the entire island except present-day Caraga region, stretching from the Zamboanga Peninsula to Davao Oriental, while the Sultanate of Sulu lost its territories in Zamboanga. Maguindanao's sultans provided Mindanao fierce armed resistance against the Spanish occupation, especially under the lead of Muhammad Kudarat. They soon allied themselves with the Sulu sultanate. The Muslim natives of the region were collectively known as Moros by the Spanish, meaning "Moor", though the Iberian Moors and the Philippine Muslims had little cultural connection outside of following Islam. A large chunk of the Spanish–Moro conflict, the war between the Spanish and Mindanao's Muslim natives took place in the Zamboanga Peninsula.

=== Spanish rule ===
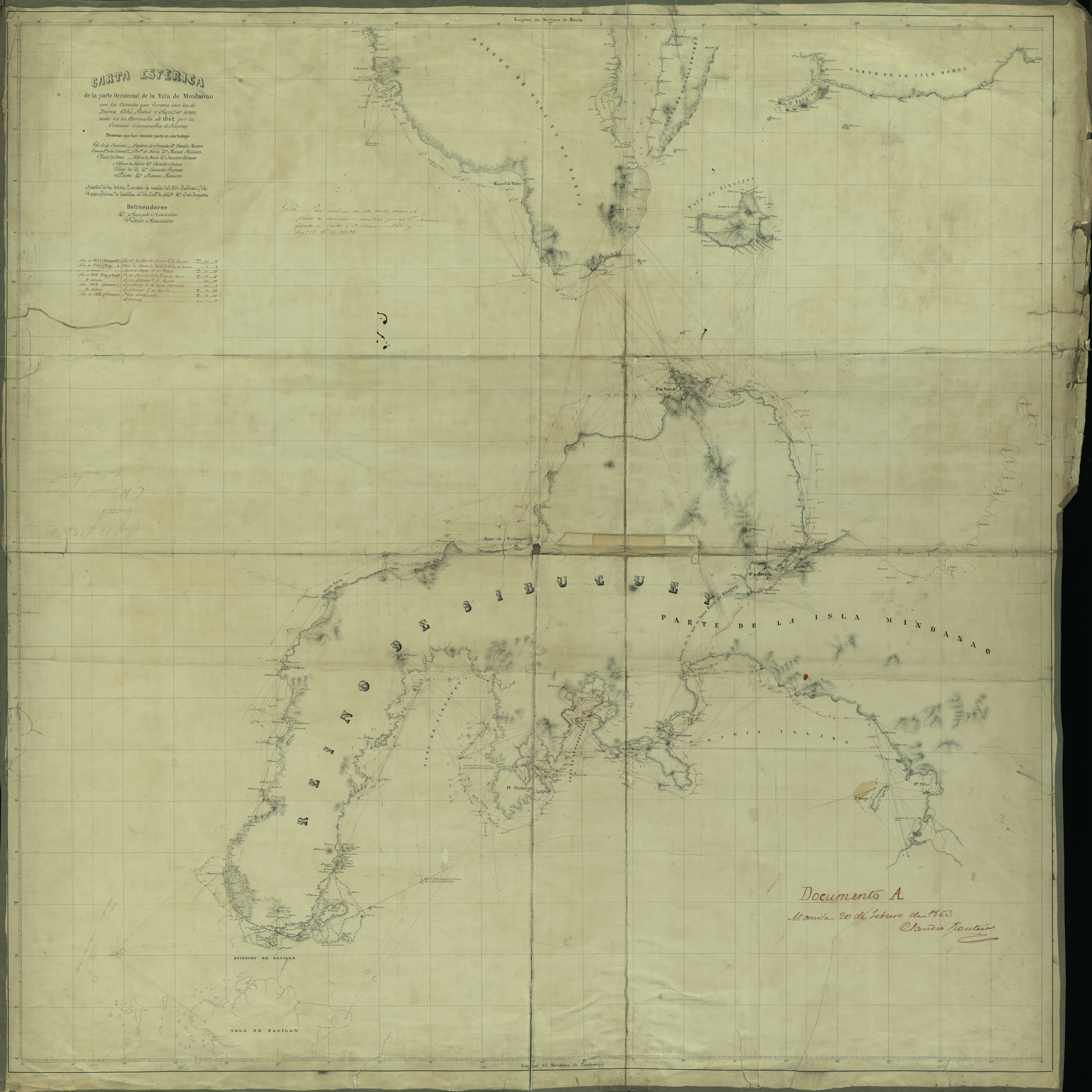
1862 map of the Zamboanga peninsula, depicting the Kingdom of Sibuguey

In 1569, Zamboanga was chosen as the site of the Spanish settlement and garrison on La Caldera (now called Barrio Recodo). Zamboanga was one of the main strongholds in Mindanao, supporting colonizing efforts in the south of the island and making way for Christian settlements. It also served as a military outpost, protecting the island against foreign invaders and Moro pirates and their Chinese allies. The province, named and centered on Zamboanga City was partly founded by Peruvian soldiers brought by Sebastián Hurtado de Corcuera.

The Zamboanga Peninsula played a central role in the Spanish–Moro conflict. It was the site of constant battling between Spanish soldiers and Moro pirate raids. While the Spanish successfully established churches in the region, they suffered heavily at the hands of Moro raiders, and had to repeatedly withdraw from the region. While the Spanish achieved a tactical victory by launching several attacks against the Sultanate of Sulu, constant fighting and attacks persisted, giving the Moros a psychological victory.

=== Province of Zamboanga ===
After the United States annexed the Spanish East Indies in 1898, the peninsula hosted a briefly independent state called the Republic of Zamboanga. It was incorporated by the Insular Government into the Moro Province, which consisted of the central and western parts of Mindanao and the Sulu Archipelago. The name and status of Moro Province were changed to the Department of Mindanao and Sulu on August 16, 1916, causing Zamboanga to become a separate province.

In 1942, the Zamboanga Peninsula along with the rest of the Philippine Islands was occupied by the Empire of Japan at the beginning of the Second World War. The Peninsula was liberated in 1945 by joint American and Philippine Commonwealth forces fighting against the Imperial Japanese Army.

On June 6, 1952, the province was partitioned into Zamboanga del Norte and Zamboanga del Sur, while the chartered city of Zamboanga became part of Zamboanga del Sur.

=== Region ===
Together with the Sulu Archipelago, the provinces that formerly made up Zamboanga Province were re-organised into Region IX by order of Presidential Decree No. 1 as part of the Integrated Reorganization Plan of President Ferdinand Marcos, that was signed on September 24, 1972.

From 1975 to 1989, the old Region IX (Western Mindanao) was further divided into two sub-regions by Presidential Decree No. 8233 dated August 21, 1975. Sub-Region IX-A consisted of Basilan, Sulu and Tawi-Tawi with Jolo, Sulu, as the sub-regional center, while Sub-Region IX-B consisted of the provinces of Zamboanga del Norte, Zamboanga del Sur and Zamboanga Sibugay, with the chartered city of Zamboanga City as the sub-regional centre.

=== Present ===
In 2001, Zamboanga Sibugay, was created from the province of Zamboanga del Sur with Ipil as the seat of government with the virtue of Republic Act No. 8973. In the same year, the residents of Basilan opted to join the Autonomous Region in Muslim Mindanao (ARMM) in a plebiscite. However, the citizens of the capital, Isabela, did not want to join so the city remained a part of this region as a result of Executive Order No. 36.

Isabela also opted out of inclusion to the Bangsamoro region during the 2019 plebiscite.

After a 2024 ruling which invalidated Sulu's inclusion to the Bangsamoro region, the Commission on Elections en banc proposed of the province's re-admission to the Zamboanga Peninsula, the region it belonged prior to its inclusion in the ARMM back in 1989. Sulu reverted to Zamboanga Peninsula by virtue of Executive Order No. 91, signed by President Bongbong Marcos on July 30, 2025.

=== Regional center issue ===
In 1978, Presidential Decree No. 1555 transferred Region IX's regional center from Jolo, Sulu to Zamboanga City.

Executive Order (EO) No. 429 was issued in 1990 by President Corazon Aquino which provided for the reorganization of the administrative regions in Mindanao. It declared that Western Mindanao would comprise Zamboanga City, Lanao del Norte, Misamis Occidental, Zamboanga del Sur, Zamboanga del Norte, Basilan, and the cities comprising those provinces. It also declared that Pagadian shall serve as the new regional center.

In 1996, President Fidel Ramos issued EO No. 325 which reorganized the Regional Development Councils. The Implementing Rules and Regulations of EO No. 325 provided that Zamboanga City is the regional center of Western Mindanao.

In 2001, President Gloria Macapagal Arroyo signed EO No. 36 which reorganized and renamed Western Mindanao to Zamboanga Peninsula. It was silent on the issue of regional government centers.

In 2004, Memorandum Circular (MC) No. 75 directed the transfer of regional offices from Zamboanga City to Pagadian citing EO No. 429 as its legal basis. However, it provided that the regional offices of the departments of Trade and Industry, Tourism, and Labor and Employment will remain in Zamboanga City, but shall establish a presence in Pagadian.

On December 22, 2010, MC No. 11 was issued imposing a moratorium on the transfer of regional offices to Pagadian. The Circular cited the high economic and social costs that the employees were experiencing in maintaining two residences and in fully transferring to Pagadian. It further directed all regional offices that are already in Pagadian to continue their operations.

On June 30, 2020, MC No. 78 was issued, repealing MC No. 11 and lifting the moratorium on the transfer of the remaining regional offices to Pagadian. The Circular affirmed that Pagadian is the regional government center while Zamboanga City is the commercial and industrial center of Region IX.

On April 19, 2023, under MC No. 18, another moratorium was imposed on the transfer of regional offices to Pagadian pending further study of its implications. The regional offices that are already in Pagadian shall continue to operate thereat.

== Geography ==
The region is located on the western part of the island of Mindanao, that lies between the Moro Gulf (part of the Celebes Sea) and the Sulu Sea. Along the shores of the peninsula are numerous bays and islands of varying sizes. The peninsula is connected to the rest of Mindanao through an isthmus situated between Panguil Bay and Pagadian Bay.

The region surrounds the province of Misamis Occidental on the northeastern corner of the geographic peninsula, though it is part of Northern Mindanao.

=== Administrative divisions ===
==== Provinces ====
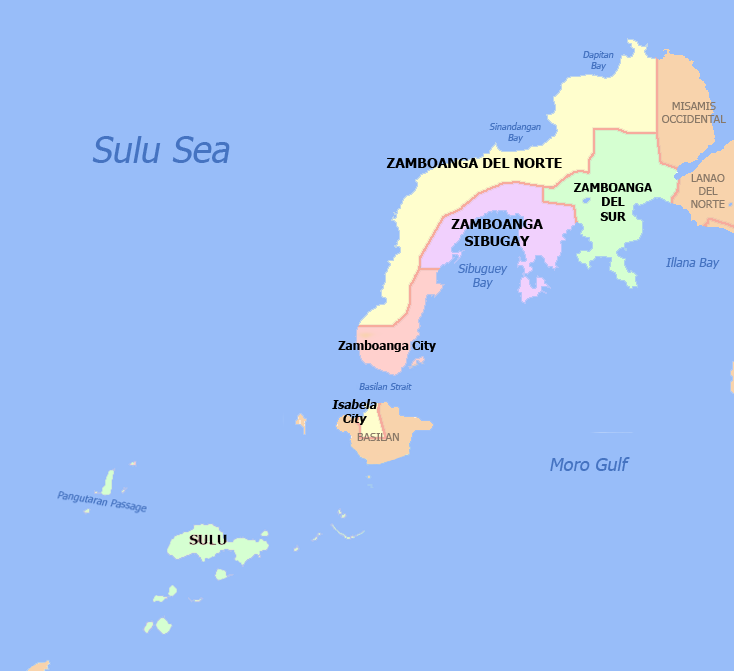

Zamboanga Peninsula comprises four provinces, one highly urbanized city, four component cities, 86 municipalities and 2,314 barangays.

Province or City		Capital	Population (2020)		Area		Density		Cities	Muni.	Barangay
					km^{2}	sq mi	/km^{2}	/sq mi			
Sulu		Jolo	20.5%	1,000,108	1,600.40	617.92	620	1,600	0	19	410
Zamboanga del Norte		Dipolog City	21.5%	1,047,455	7,300.11	2,818.59	140	360	2	25	691
Zamboanga del Sur		Pagadian City	21.5%	1,050,668	4,484.21	1,731.36	230	600	1	26	681
Zamboanga Sibugay		Ipil	13.7%	669,840	3,481.28	1,344.13	180	470	0	16	389
Zamboanga City	†	—	20.0%	977,234	1,414.70	546.22	690	1,800	1	—	98
Isabela City	‡	—	2.7%	130,379	233.73	90.24	560	1,500	1	—	45
Total				4,875,684	18,504.43	7,144.60	260	670	5	86	2,314
† Zamboanga City is a highly urbanized city; figures are excluded from Zamboanga del Sur.; ‡ Figures include the component city of Isabela, which is under the administrative jurisdiction of the region.

===== Governors and vice governors =====
Province	Image	Governor	Political party	Vice governor
Sulu		Abdusakur A. Tan II	Lakas	Abdusakur M. Tan
Zamboanga del Norte		Darel Dexter T. Uy	Lakas	Julius C. Napigquit
Zamboanga del Sur		Divina Grace C. Yu	Lakas	Roseller Ariosa
Zamboanga Sibugay		Dulce Ann K. Hofer	PFP	Richard D. Olegario

==== Cities ====
Dapitan is one of the two cities of Zamboanga del Norte. Known as the "Shrine City in the Philippines", this was where José Rizal, the national hero of the country, was exiled. It is also known for the old St. James Parish and the beach resort of Dakak.

Dipolog, capital of Zamboanga del Norte, is known for their abundance of orchids, thus it is called "Orchid City of the South" or "Orchid City". They have their nature spots and historical spots, such as Dipolog Cathedral, Dipolog Boulevard, Cogon Park, Japanese Park, Plaza Magsaysay, the Sungkilaw Falls, and the 3,003 steps to Linabo Peak.

Isabela is a component city of the province of Basilan. Until 2017, it was the capital of the said province, since then, Basilan's government was moved to Lamitan. Isabela continues to be under the jurisdiction of Basilan for the administration of provincially devolved services and functions, but for regional and statistics purposes, the city is part of Zamboanga Peninsula, in contrast to the rest of Basilan which is under BARMM. Named after Queen Isabella II, Isabela was the southernmost outpost of the Spanish Empire in the Philippines until the fall of Jolo in 1878. It hosted a Spanish fort (later destroyed in World War II) since 1848, and was the primary naval base of the Spanish in Mindanao until 1899. The city serves as an entry point for trade and commerce of Basilan island.

Pagadian is the capital of Zamboanga del Sur, as well as the region's administrative center. The city is known as the "Little Hong Kong of the South" because of its topographical feature that is reminiscent of Hong Kong. It also has an affluent Chinese community that officially celebrates the Chinese Lunar New Year.

Zamboanga City is the only highly urbanized city in the region. Geographically located at the southwestern tip of the peninsula, the city continues to be the economic and industrial center of the region, generating more than half of its economy. The city is the lone member of BIMP-EAGA in the Zamboanga Peninsula. It also has the largest airport and seaport and the city in the region with most investors. Zamboanga City is commonly grouped with the province Zamboanga del Sur, although independent from it.

- † Regional center

City	Population (2020)	Area		Density		City class	Province
		km^{2}	sq mi	/km^{2}	/sq mi		
Dapitan	85,202	390.53	150.78	220	570	Component	Zamboanga del Norte
Dipolog	138,141	241.13	93.10	570	1,500	Component	Zamboanga del Norte
Isabela	130,379	140.7	54.3	930	2,400	Component	Basilan
† Pagadian	210,452	378.80	146.26	560	1,500	Component	Zamboanga del Sur
Zamboanga City	977,234	1,414.7	546.2	690	1,800	Highly urbanized	Zamboanga del Sur

== Demographics ==
Population census of Zamboanga Peninsula
Year	Pop.	±% p.a.
1903	98,086	—
1918	147,333	+2.75%
1939	355,984	+4.29%
1948	521,941	+4.34%
1960	900,730	+4.65%
1970	1,334,446	+4.00%
1975	1,541,459	+2.93%
1980	1,821,751	+3.40%
1990	2,280,460	+2.27%
1995	2,567,651	+2.25%
2000	2,831,412	+2.12%
2007	3,230,094	+1.83%
2010	3,407,353	+1.96%
2015	3,629,783	+1.21%
2020	3,875,576	+1.39%
2024	3,943,837	+0.42%
Source: Philippine Statistics Authority

=== Languages ===
The native languages of Zamboanga Peninsula are:

- Chavacano - spoken in Zamboanga City and Isabela, Basilan, where it serves as a main lingua franca. It had been also a main lingua franca throughout the region until the mid-20th century due to the influx of migrants from Cebuano-speaking provinces of Visayas, leading to its steep decline, but it is still utilized in Zamboanga City and Isabela, Basilan as their main language.
- Maguindanaon - spoken in coastal areas in Zamboanga del Sur and Zamboanga Sibugay facing Maguindanao del Norte, Maguindanao del Sur and Soccsksargen.
- Maranao - spoken mainly in eastern coastal areas of Zamboanga del Sur, facing Lanao del Norte and Lanao del Sur, but it is also heard among ethnic Maranaos throughout the region especially in urban areas.
- Subanen - spoken in the region's interior.
- Tausug - spoken in Isabela, Basilan, Sulu and around coastal parts of Zamboanga City and Zamboanga del Sur. It is also spoken as a primary language in Sulu.
- Yakan - spoken in Isabela, Basilan and Zamboanga City.

The non-native languages of Zamboanga Peninsula are:

- Cebuano - spoken in Zamboanga del Norte, Zamboanga del Sur and Zamboanga Sibugay. The language serves as a lingua franca throughout the region except Zamboanga City and Isabela, Basilan, albeit it is heard in those cities as a minority language.
- Hiligaynon - spoken in parts of Zamboanga City, Zamboanga del Sur and Zamboanga Sibugay.
- Ilocano - spoken Titay and Ipil, both in Zamboanga Sibugay, but it became rare when plenty of Cebuano-speaking migrants from Visayas settled in those municipalities that resulted in Cebuano being the dominant language over time. It is now rarely spoken by the elderly of Ilocano descent, especially settlers and their children who migrated in those municipalities from the northern Philippines.
- Tagalog/Filipino - spoken in Zamboanga del Norte, Zamboanga del Sur and Zamboanga Sibugay. It is widely understood in the region as a second language so is the Philippines as a whole, and used in businesses and education. It is widely used as a secondary lingua franca in such cities as Zamboanga City and Pagadian between various ethnicities, especially those who cannot speak or understand Chavacano or even Cebuano.
- Malay - spoken in coastal areas of Zamboanga City; Isabela, Basilan; and Sulu, due to their geographical contact with Sabah, Malaysia. It had been used as a trade language long before Spanish colonial period, when the people from these aforementioned places traded with neighboring lands such as Brunei.

=== Religion ===
Christianity is the majority of the region's population, with Catholics (63.46%) while Islam (18.22%) is the largest minority in this region.

== Economy ==
Poverty incidence of Zamboanga Peninsula (%)

Source: Philippine Statistics Authority

The Philippine Statistics Authority (PSA) released the first ever report of the Provincial Product Accounts (PPA) of Zamboanga Peninsula covering the period 2018 to 2022. The release covers three provinces, namely, Zamboanga del Norte, Zamboanga del Sur, and Zamboanga Sibugay, as well as the cities of Zamboanga and Isabela. The PPA results showed that in 2022, the city of Zamboanga accounted for 32.6 percent of the region's total economy, followed by Zamboanga del Norte with a share of 26.8 percent, Zamboanga del Sur with 23.7 percent, and Zamboanga Sibugay with 14.1 percent. Meanwhile, the city of Isabela recorded a 2.7 percent share.

In terms of growth rate, all economies in the region expanded in 2022, with Zamboanga Sibugay recording the fastest growth of 8.6 percent, followed by city of Zamboanga with a growth rate of 8.1 percent, both of which were higher than the region's economic growth of 7.5 percent. On the other hand, the city of Isabela, Zamboanga del Norte, and Zamboanga del Sur posted growth rates of 7.21 percent, 7.17 percent, and 6.5 percent, respectively.

The region has the first export-processing zone in Mindanao. Farming and fishing are the main economic activities of the region. It also has rice and corn mills, oil processing, coffee berry processing and processing of latex from rubber. Its home industries include rattan and furniture craft, basket making, weaving and brass work. Dipolog is home to a number of Bottled Sardines Companies which are being exported abroad. Meanwhile, Dapitan is home to several tourist spots, such as Dakak Park and Beach Resort, Rizal Shrine, and Glorious Fantasyland, one of the very few amusement parks located in Mindanao.

While Pagadian is the region's new regional center, Zamboanga City’s economy remains to be the most robust and fastest growing in the region. Zamboanga City also retains the title of being the commercial and industrial center of the region.

=== Resources ===
The region has vast forest resources and previously used to export logs, lumber, veneer and plywood. Mineral deposits include gold, chromite, coal, iron, lead, and manganese. Among its non-metallic reserves are coal, silica, salt, marble, silica sand, and gravel. Its fishing grounds are devoted to commercial and municipal fishing. It has also aqua farms for brackish water and freshwater fishes.

=== Area of Growth ===
The economic fulcrum of the region lies at the center of the peninsula that is the area connecting Ipil and Liloy. Along with its premiere towns of Sindangan and Molave, it has the fastest economic activity of the region. The 50-kilometer link between the north and the south would act as the main artery of economy in the region.

=== Shopping malls ===
==== Lists of national malls in Zamboanga Peninsula (operating or under construction) ====
Name	Location	Gross floor area	Opened	Status	Remarks
Gaisano Capital Pagadian	Rizal Avenue, Pagadian, Zamboanga del Sur	46,307 m^{2}	2008	Operating	First Gaisano Capital in the region.
CityMall Tetuan	Don Alfaro Street, Tetuan, Zamboanga City	15,344 m^{2}	2015	Operating	First CityMall in the region and in Zamboanga City.
KCC Mall de Zamboanga	Camins Avenue, Zamboanga City	162,000 m^{2}	2015	Operating	First KCC Mall and the largest mall in the region.
CityMall Dipolog	Sta. Filomena, Dipolog, Zamboanga del Norte	12,862 m^{2}	2018	Operating	First CityMall in Zamboanga del Norte.
SM City Mindpro	La Purisima Street, Zamboanga City	59,383 m^{2}	2020	Operating	First SM mall in the region. Originally Mindpro Citimall, it was acquired by SM Prime Holdings last 2016.
Gaisano Grand Ipil	Ipil, Zamboanga Sibugay	53,985 m^{2}	2023	Operating	First Gaisano Grand mall in the region, and first national-scale mall in Zamboanga Sibugay.
Gaisano Capital Molave	Molave, Zamboanga del Sur	13,206 m^{2}	Permanently Closed	For Sale	The second Gaisano Capital in Zamboanga del Sur and in the region.
Robinsons Pagadian	Pagadian, Zamboanga del Sur	57,221 m^{2}	2025	Operating	Set to become the first Robinsons mall in the region.
Grand CityMall Guiwan	Guiwan, Zamboanga City	33,814 m^{2}	2024	Under-construction	The second CityMall in Zamboanga City, and the third in the region. Set to become the largest CityMall in the country.
SM City Zamboanga	Vitaliano Agan Avenue, Zamboanga City	110,055 m^{2}	2024	Under-construction	The second SM Supermall in Zamboanga City and in the region.
Gaisano Grand Dipolog	Sta. Filomena, Dipolog, Zamboanga del Norte	TBA	TBD	Under-construction	Set to become the first Gaisano Grand mall in Zamboanga del Norte.

== Infrastructure ==
=== Airports ===
- Dipolog Airport – is the main airport serving the general area of Dipolog, the capital city of Zamboanga del Norte, in the Philippines. It is classified as a Class 1 principal (major domestic) by the Civil Aviation Authority of the Philippines. (CAAP)
- Pagadian Airport – is the airport serving the city of Pagadian, the rest of the province of Zamboanga del Sur, and the province of Zamboanga Sibugay in the Philippines. It is classified as a Class 1 principal (major domestic) by the Civil Aviation Authority of the Philippines. (CAAP)
- Zamboanga International Airport – is the main airport serving Zamboanga City in the Philippines. Located on a 270-hectare (670-acre) site in Barangay Canelar, Zamboanga City, the airport is Mindanao's third-busiest airport. Despite being billed as an international airport, It is classified as a Class 1 principal (major domestic) by the Civil Aviation Authority of the Philippines. (CAAP) The airport is planned to be transferred to Mercedes by 2030, approximately 17 km away from the city's Central Business District.

=== Seaports ===
- Port of Dapitan – It is owned and managed by Philippine Ports Authority and is the baseport of the Port Management Office Zamboanga del Norte.
- Port of Pagadian – it recently restarted its operations.
- Ipil Port
- Port of Zamboanga – it is managed by the Philippine Ports Authority, Zamboanga Freeport Authority (ZFA). it is a center for sardine exports to the United States, Europe, the Middle, and Far East. 25 shipping lines operate via the port, serviced by four shipyards operating within the port boundaries and in Zamboanga City.

=== Roads and Bridges ===
- Zamboanga City By-Pass Road – This by-pass road is a 36.77 km with a 12 meter wide, 2 lane road with slope protection, the route starts at the junction of MCLL National Highway and Barangay Culianan, traversing Barangay Culianan – Sinubong. The project was started on January 9, 2012, and was completed on December 28, 2018.
- Pan-Philippine Highway (AH26) - Section of AH26 passes Zamboanga del Sur and Zamboanga Sibugay, with Zamboanga City being its terminus.
