= SM City Mindpro =

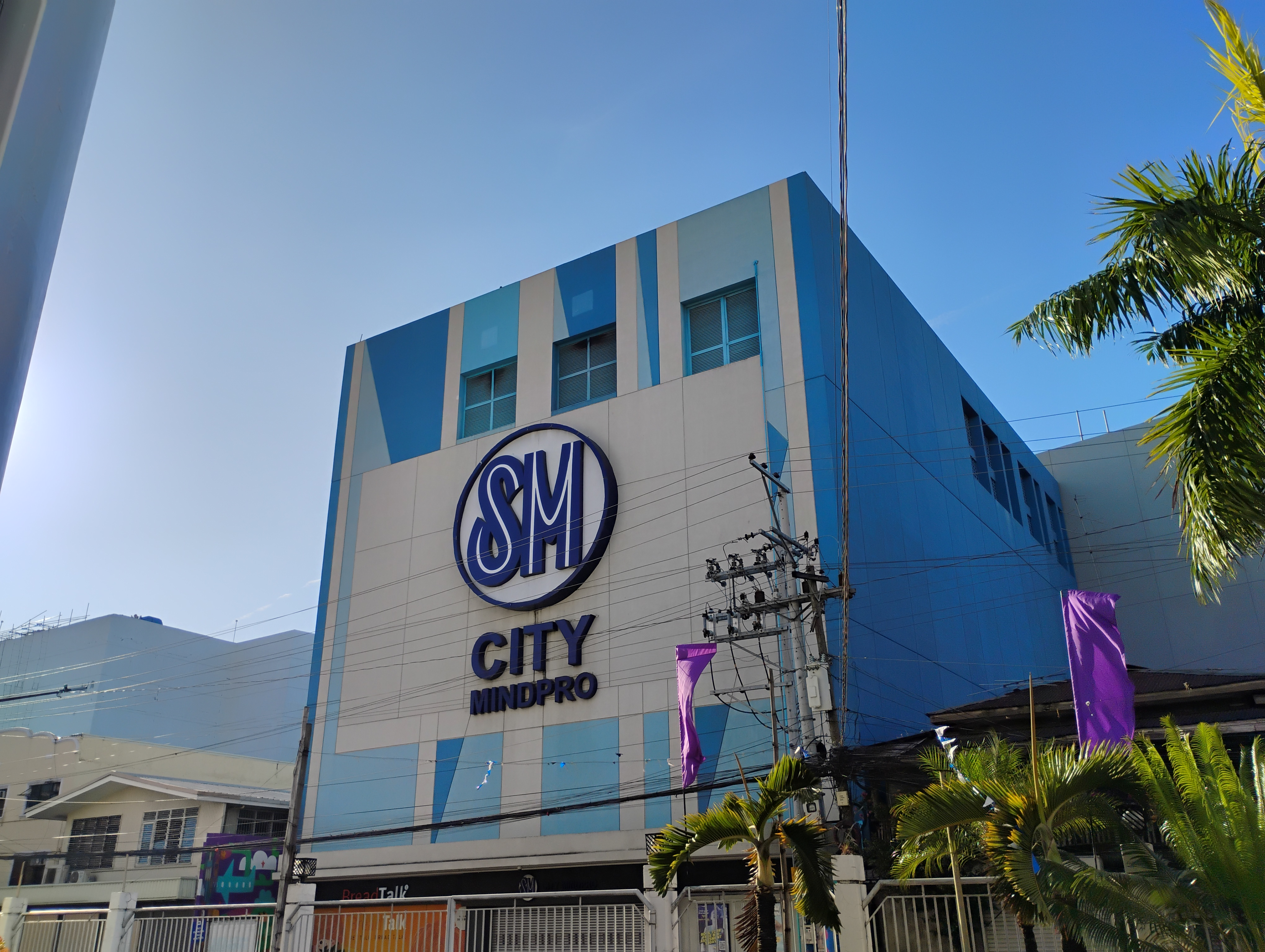
- Location: Zamboanga City, Philippines
- Coordinates: 6°54′28″N 122°04′34″E
- Address: La Purisima Street corner Campaner Street
- Opened: As Mindpro Citimall: December 7, 1996; 29 years ago; As SM City Mindpro: December 8, 2020; 5 years ago
- Closed: As Mindpro Citimall: September 30, 2018; 8 years ago
- Developer: SM Prime Holdings
- Manager: SM Prime Holdings (since August 2016, 70%); Mindpro Retail Inc. (30%)
- Architect: Jose Siao Ling and Associates
- Num. of stores: 123 shops and establishments
- Num. of anchor tenants: 11
- Floor area: 59,383 m^{2} (639,190 sq ft)
- Floors: 4 (main mall); 6 (carpark building)
- Parking: 546+ slots
- Website: SM City Mindpro

SM City Mindpro is a shopping mall located along La Purisima St. cor. Campaner St., Brgy. Zone III, Zamboanga City. It is owned and operated by SM Prime Holdings (70%), the largest retail and mall operator in the Philippines, and Mindpro Retail Inc. (30%), opened on December 8, 2020. It is the first SM Supermall in Zamboanga Peninsula, 7th SM Supermall in Mindanao and the 75th SM Supermall in the Philippines. It is also the second largest SM supermall in Zamboanga City and Zamboanga Peninsula after SM City Zamboanga.

Prior to SM's partial acquisition, the mall as Mindpro Citimall houses Mindpro Supermarket, 3 cinemas, a foodcourt and a digital hub. Although it was initially reported that the property was acquired by SM Prime Holdings last August 2016, Mindpro Retail Inc., still holds 30% of its ownership.

== History ==
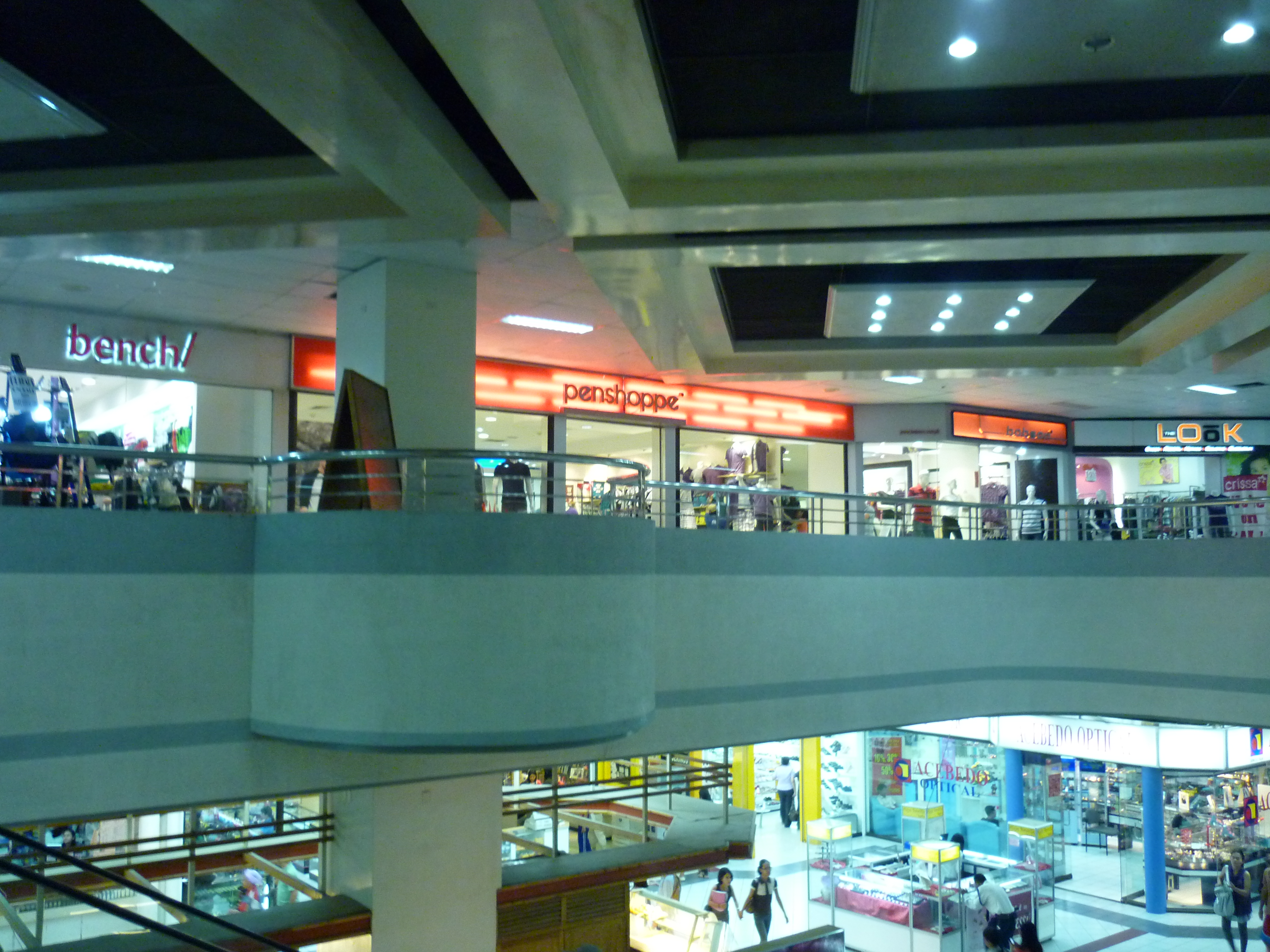
Mindpro Citimall interior. 2010

Mindpro Citimall is owned and operated by Mindpro Retail Inc, a family corporation based in Zamboanga City. The mall, which was at a location that was used to be Jingyong Bowling and Mindpro Lumberyard, started in early 1992. The historic opening of the shopping mall was on December 7, 1996. The cinemas (originally three) were opened in February 1997. Mindpro Citimall has been the site of regional entertainment events, trade fairs, and exhibits.

In August 2016, SM Prime acquired 70% of property from Mindpro, Inc., while the latter has 30% remains of the property.

In February 2017, SM Bonus products were available in Mindpro Supermarket, where SM Advantage Cards were accepted as a result of the partnership.

With a courtesy call with the Mayor of Zamboanga City, the SM Prime made a presentation of the new mall. Mindpro Citimall held its last day of operations on September 30, 2018. Construction and expansion of the mall followed.

Originally, the grand opening of the mall as "SM City Mindpro" was supposedly on November 27, 2020, however, it was rescheduled to December 8, 2020, citing the two employees of the said mall test positive for COVID-19.

== Mall features ==
SM City Mindpro is a four-level shopping mall located on a 13,078 squared meter site along La Purisima and Campaner Sts. in the city's downtown area, with a total floor area of 59,383 square meters. It features a more than 546-slot six-level parking area with 481 car slots, 53 motorcycle slots and 12 PWD slots, as well as a transport terminal.

=== Tenants ===
SM City Mindpro is anchored by The SM Store and Mindpro Supermarket (a locally owned supermarket affiliated by SM Markets), as well as four cinemas with a total seating capacity of 414, and a Cyberzone. It also has some junior anchors and retail affiliates such as SM Appliance Center, ACE Hardware, Watsons, Surplus, Miniso, Sports Central, and BDO. It also has a mix of more than 104 local, national and global–branded food and retail shops.

Like all the tenants, some of them had set foot in Zamboanga City as Zamboanga's first, including Pretzelmaker, and Popeyes which are also the firsts in the Visayas and Mindanao area and Uniqlo and Starbucks which are the firsts in the region.

== Legacy ==
After 2 years and 2 months following the success of SM City Mindpro, SM Prime Holdings decided to plant another SM Supermall in the city; SM City Zamboanga which is just over a kilometer away from SM City Mindpro. SM Group is also set to open malls in La Union and Laoag.

In a separate interview, Oliver Tiu, SM Vice President for Operations said they decided to put up another mall since the location of Zamboanga City is very strategic to the neighboring cities and provinces. Tiu said they are also looking into the possibility of trading with neighboring countries of which Zamboanga City is the best gateway.

The second mall is located in the 2.5-hectare property SM has acquired in Camino Nuevo village. It will be the eighth SM Mall in the entire Mindanao.

== See also ==
- Mindpro Inc.
- KCC Mall de Zamboanga
- SM City Zamboanga
- List of shopping malls in the Philippines
- SM Supermalls

Preceded by SM City Butuan	76th SM Supermall; 2020	Succeeded by SM City Daet
