= SM City Zamboanga =

Shopping mall in Zamboanga City, Philippines

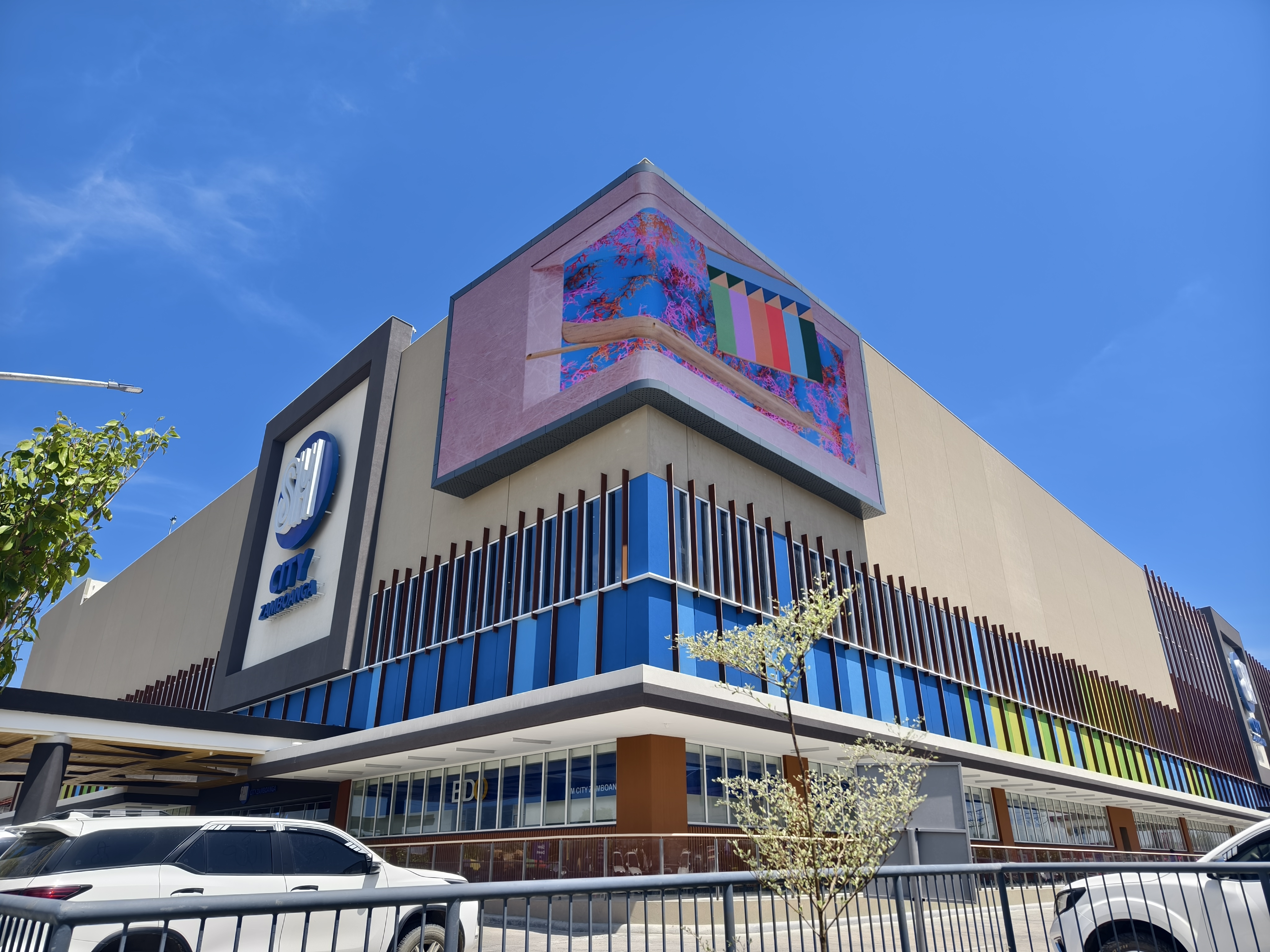
- The mall's outdoor Anamorphic LED display
- Location: Zamboanga City, Philippines
- Coordinates: 6°55′N 122°05′E
- Address: Vitaliano Agan Avenue, Camino Neuvo
- Opened: March 20, 2026; 7 months ago
- Developer: SM Prime Holdings
- Manager: SM Supermalls
- Architect: Estudio Arkipelago
- Num. of stores: 170~
- Floor area: 91,000 m^{2} (980,000 sq ft)
- Floors: 5: Roofdeck Parking; Fourth Level (Parking); Third Level; Second Level; Upper Ground Level; Lower Ground Level
- Parking: TBA
- Website: SM City Zamboanga

SM City Zamboanga is a shopping mall located along Vitaliano Agan Avenue in Zamboanga City. Developed and owned by SM Prime Holdings, it opened to the public on March 20, 2026, as the second SM Supermall in both the city and the Zamboanga Peninsula. It is the 90th SM Supermall in the Philippines and the 8th in the Mindanao region following SM City Mindpro. It is the second largest mall in the city and the region, following KCC Mall de Zamboanga which is located just across the same street.

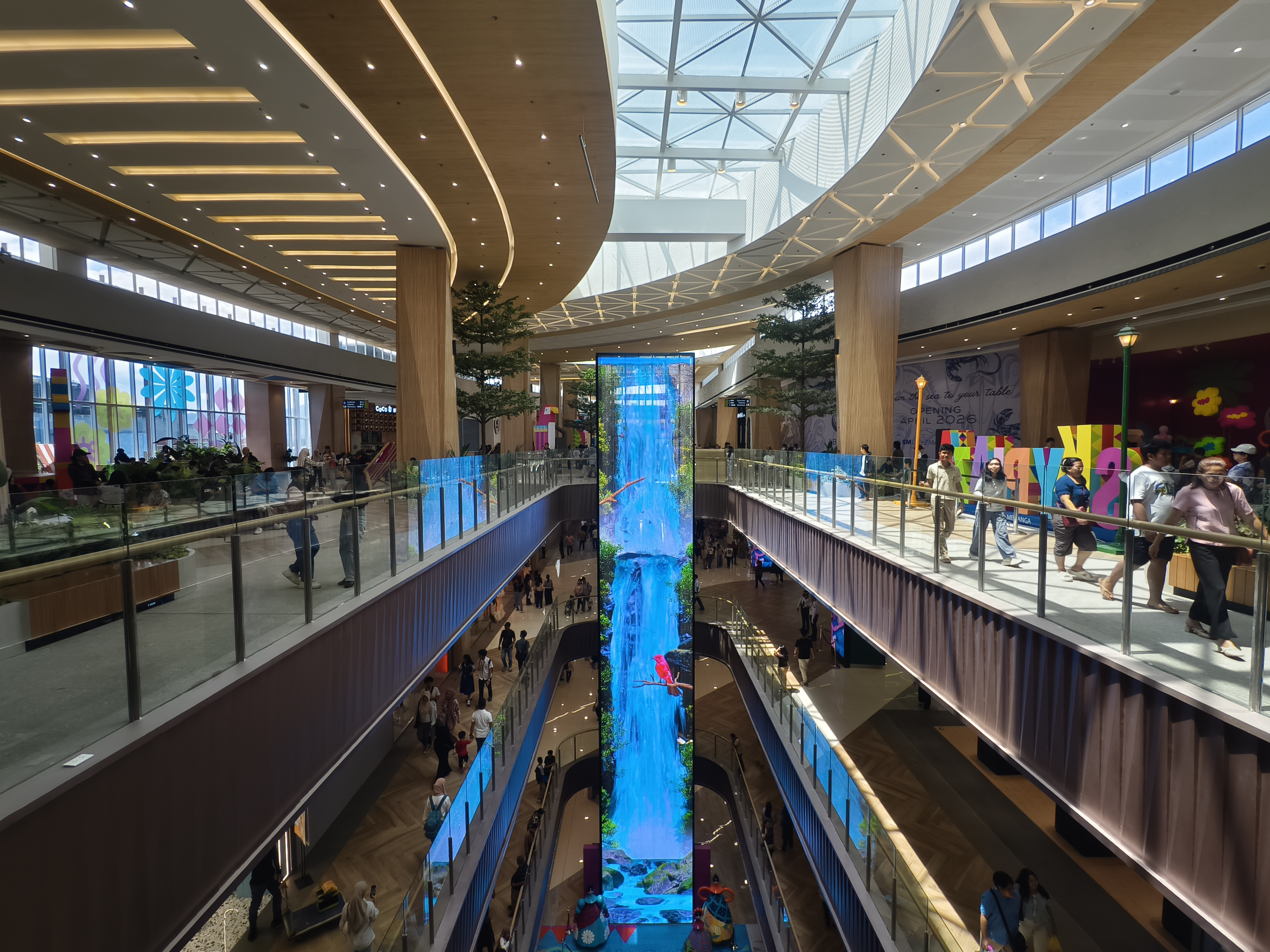
The mall's atrium from the 'Sky Plaza' level

Following the successful opening of SM City Mindpro in December 2020, SM Prime Holdings began scouting for a larger site to develop a second, larger mall in the city. The mall is located along Vitaliano Agan Avenue, one of the busiest Avenues in the city and opened on March 20, 2026.

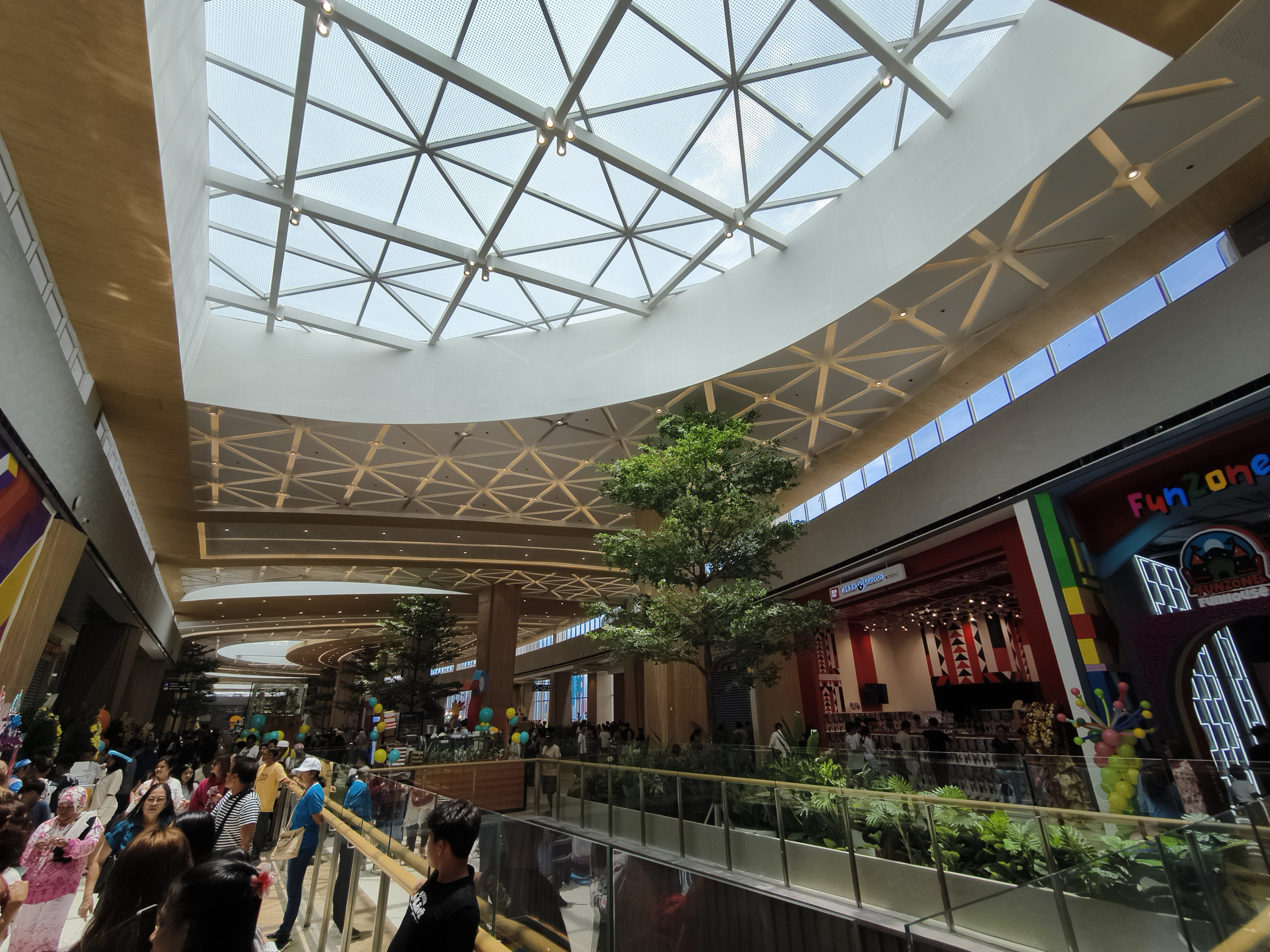
The mall's amusement area

The mall has a total retail area of 61,000 square meters, and a total gross floor area of 91,000 square meters.

Unlike SM City Mindpro of which 30% is being managed by Mindpro Retail Inc, SM City Zamboanga is fully owned by SM Prime Holdings.

== Mall features ==
SM Prime Holdings developed the mall as 4-level retail complex. It incorporates biophilic design language and an indoor garden. The mall contains stores, restaurants, and entertainment venues across approximately 60,000 square meters of retail space.

The 4-level development adds more than 42,000 square meters of gross leasable area (GLA) to Zamboanga City's retail landscape.

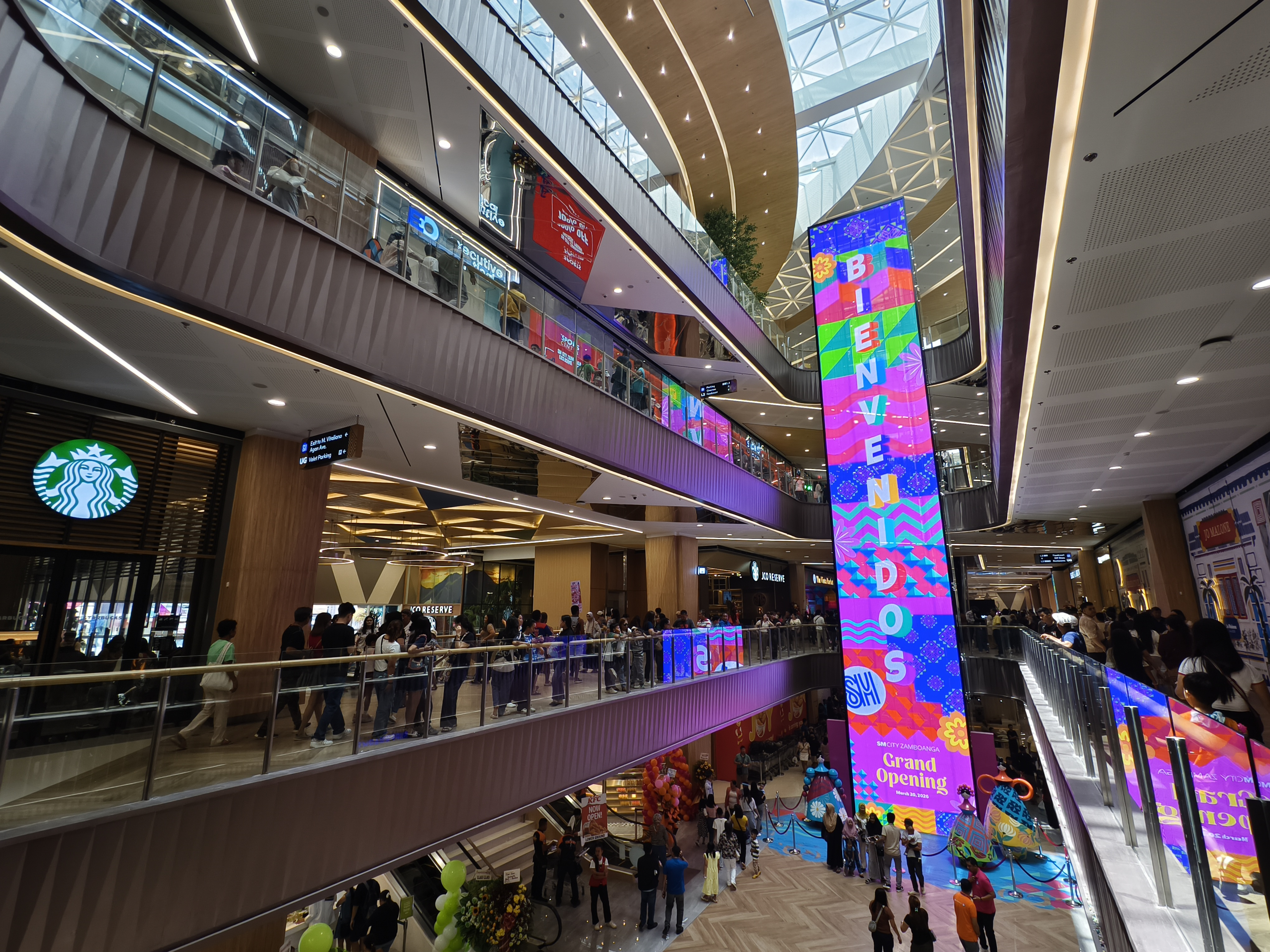
The mall's atrium viewed from the upper ground level

The mall's central atrium features a "Waterfall LED Display" integrated into the facade of the 22-meter 4-level scenic elevator, which is the tallest in Mindanao. The exterior of the mall features a corner anamorphic LED display.

The mall also houses an electric vehicle charging station, valet parking, and sustainability initiatives such as solar panels, a trash-to-cash recycling program, and an e-waste collection facility.

Designed to serve the region's diverse community, the mall also includes a Muslim Prayer Room.

It is anchored by major tenants including The SM Store, Mindpro Supermarket, Adidas, Fully Booked, JCO Reserve, and Gashapon from Japan.

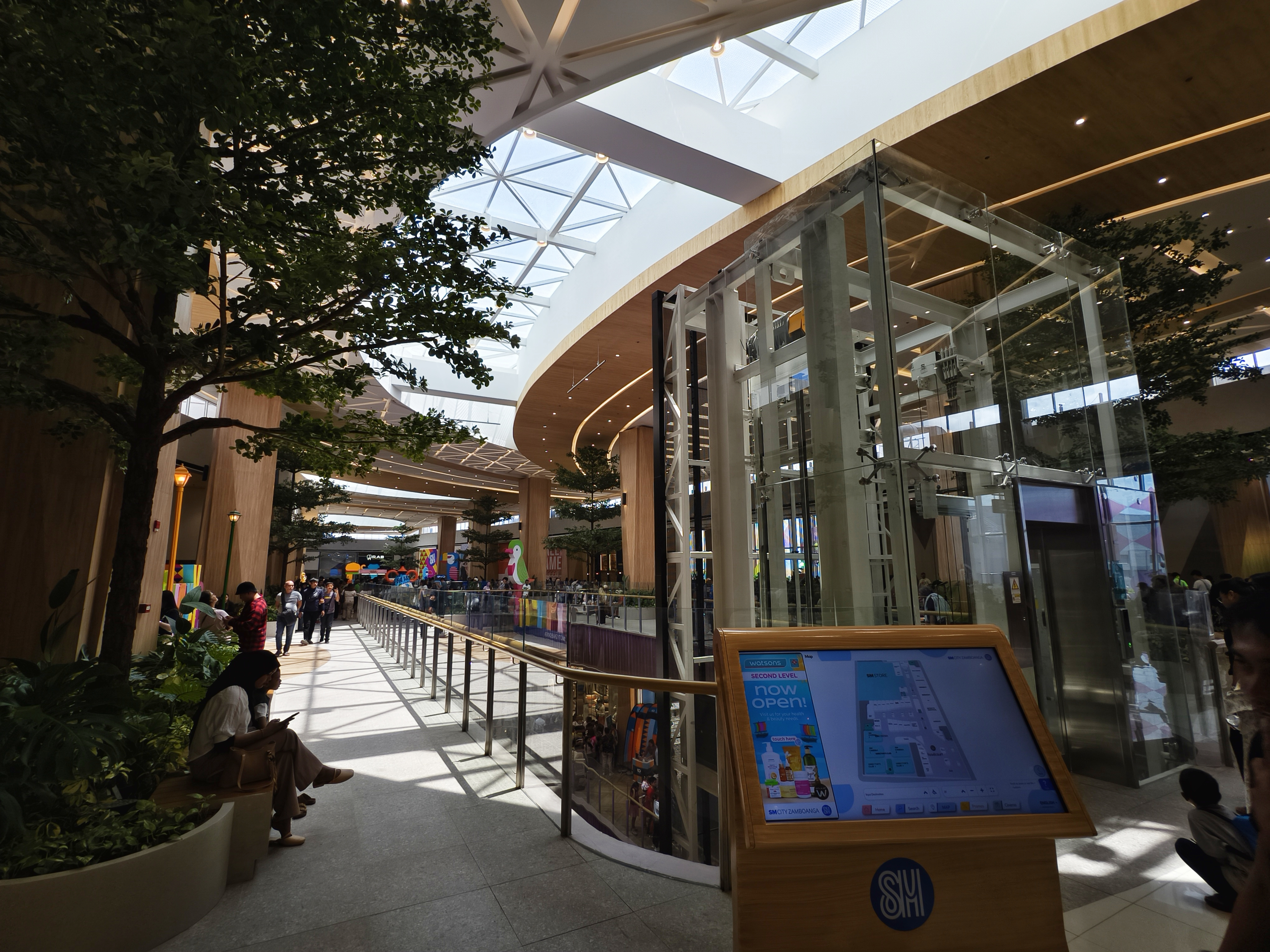
A viewpoint of the mall's third level

Additional features include an indoor garden with a high skylight ceiling and aviary-themed park (Skyplaza), a cyberzone, a food court, three digital SM Cinemas with two Director's Clubs cinemas, and a dedicated Paw Park.

=== Food Court ===
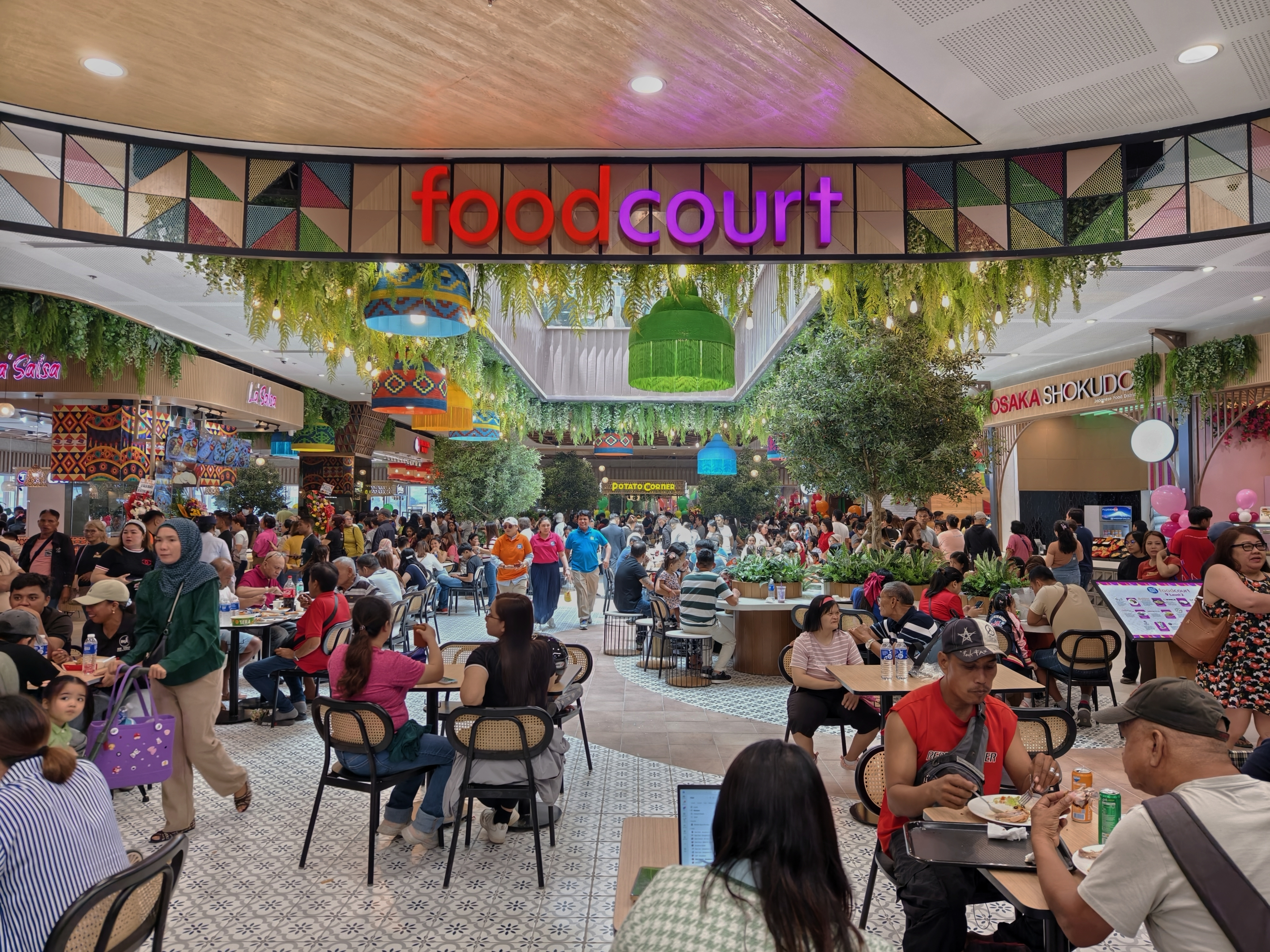
The mall's food court on opening day

The food court's design incorporates elements of the Zamboanga Peninsula's rich and diverse cultural heritage, utilizing regional patterns and traditional architectural motifs.

=== Cinemas ===
SM City Zamboanga houses five cinema screens jointly operated by SM Lifestyle Entertainment Inc. and Mindpro Inc. This includes three standard-format theaters and two Director's Club cinemas, which offer premium seating and concierge services.

=== Supermarket ===
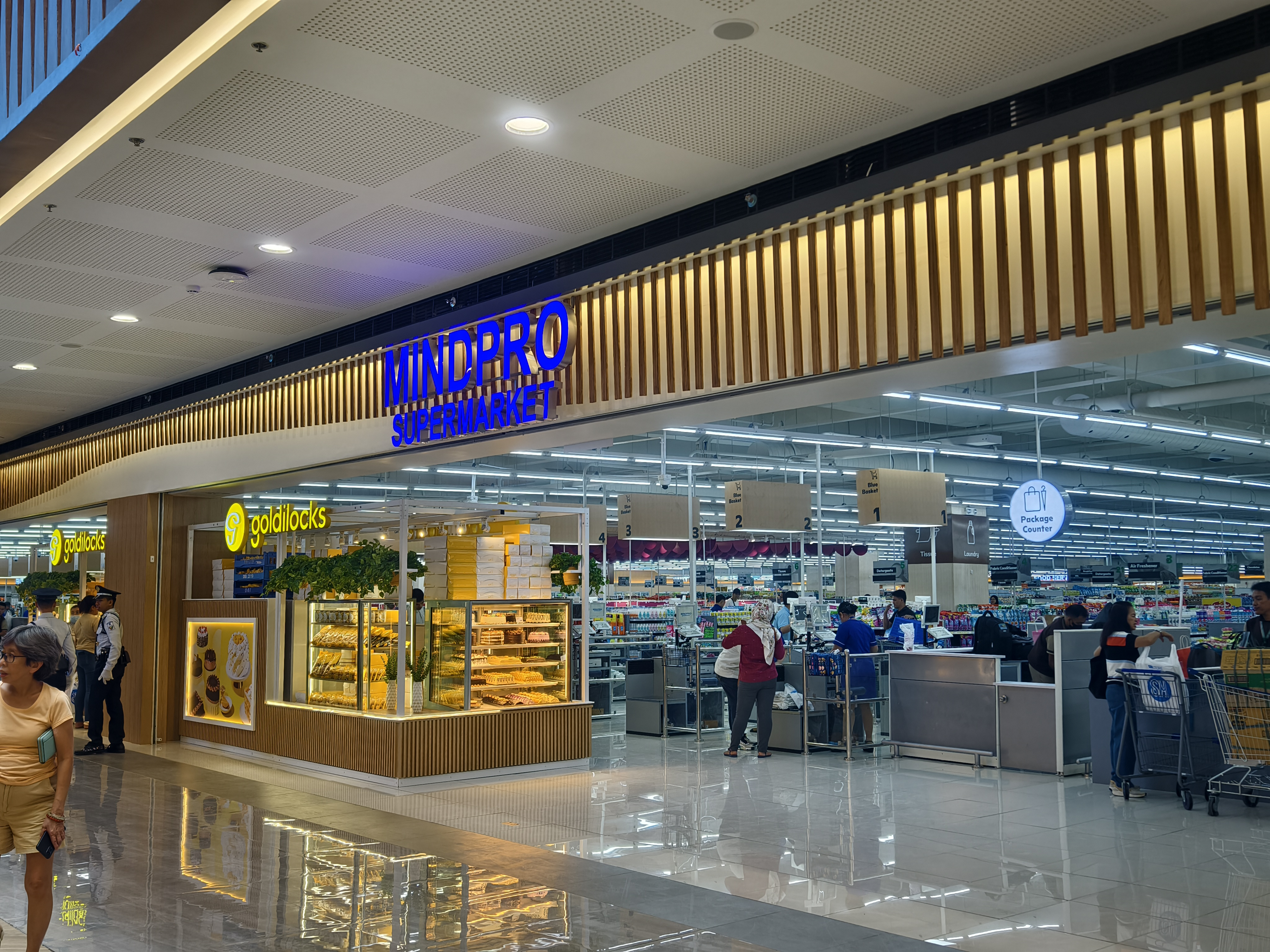
Mindpro Supermarket's 2nd branch

While the mall is owned and developed by SM Prime Holdings, the anchor supermarket is operated by Mindpro Retail Inc. (a subsidiary of SM Retail Inc.) under the Mindpro Supermarket brand.

This arrangement is unique within the SM Supermalls portfolio; it is the first instance of a fully-owned SM mall anchoring a supermarket that is not managed by SM's own; Supervalue Inc. (SM Supermarket) or Super Shopping Market Inc. (SM Hypermarket).

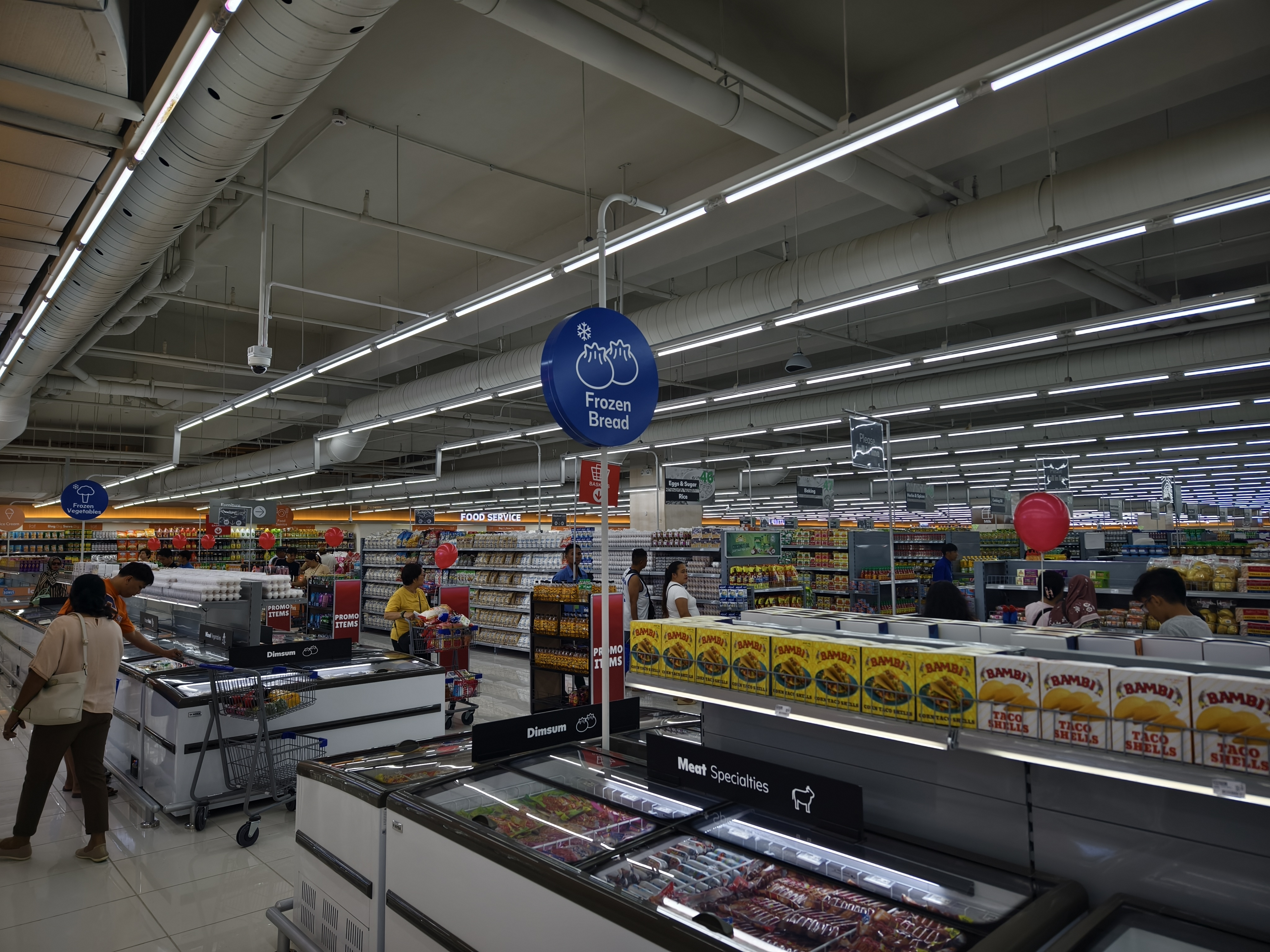
The interior of Mindpro Supermarket

Despite Mindpro Supermarket being the anchor of the mall's supermarket, it is referred as "SM Supermarket" on the wayfinders and the mall's floor plan.

== See also ==
- SM Supermalls
- SM City Mindpro
- KCC Mall de Zamboanga

Preceded by SM City La Union	90th SM Supermall; 2026	Succeeded by SM Nuvali
