= KCC Malls =

Chain of shopping malls in the Philippines

- Company type: Shopping malls
- Traded as: KCC Malls
- Industry: Shopping malls
- Founded: 1947; 79 years ago 1989; 37 years ago (as wholesale retail)
- Headquarters: General Santos City, Philippines
- Number of locations: 5
- Area served: Mindanao, Philippines
- Owner: KCC Holdings Inc.
- Website: kccmalls.com

KCC Malls (Koronadal Commercial Center) is a chain of shopping malls that originated in Koronadal City, South Cotabato, Philippines. It is owned by Koronadal Commercial Corporation and its headquarters is in General Santos City. KCC has five malls in operation in General Santos City, Koronadal City, Zamboanga City and Cotabato City.

== History ==
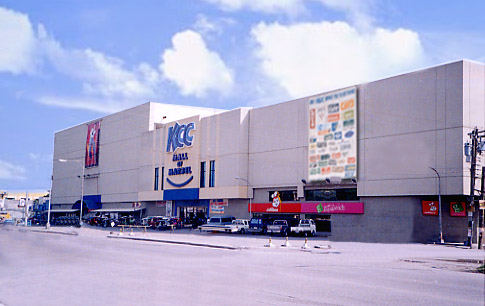
KCC Mall of Marbel in 2006, prior to its renovation in 2015

KCC started in 1947 as a textile store in Koronadal. It was a time when Koronadal was rapidly commercialising and became the capital of South Cotabato. It then expanded in 1989 as a supermarket and department store and branded as KCC Shopping Center.

In 1992, KCC expanded their operations with a second branch in General Santos as KCC Warehouse Plaza, which was later renamed KCC Mall of GenSan in 1996. In 2000, the KCC Shopping Center in Koronadal became the KCC Mall of Marbel.

In 2012, the branch in General Santos added 21,450 square meters of space and was later called 'Veranza by KCC, or simply Veranza Mall, with an Al-Fresco dining strip, additional stores, and an activity center.

With their growing profitability in Koronadal and General Santos, KCC began expanding in other cities in Mindanao.

On December 10, 2015, KCC Mall de Zamboanga opened and became the second largest mall in Mindanao in terms of ground floor area until 2025 where KCC Mall of Cotabato overthrown KCC Mall De Zamboanga as the 2nd largest Mall in Mindanao.

On October 28, 2018, their fifth mall, KCC Mall of Cotabato. The construction started on July 1, 2020. The target construction period for was 20-24 months. Due to the pandemic, the target date of opening was moved to 2023 or 2024. After completion of the mall, the construction will proceed to phase two, which is the construction of the 11-storey hotel and a convention center. Upon its completion, KCC Mall of Cotabato will be the largest KCC mall and the second largest mall in Mindanao. In August 2023, a fire occurred inside KCC Mall de Zamboanga. In November 2023, KCC Mall of GenSan was damaged by an earthquake.

== Branches ==
=== Existing malls ===
| Name | Address | Floor area (m^{2}) | Land area (m^{2}) | Type | Opening Date/Year | Ref |
|---|---|---|---|---|---|---|
| KCC Mall of Marbel | General Santos Drive, Barangay Zone II (Poblacion), Koronadal City, South Cotabato | 14,800 | 25,000 | Main | August 8, 1947 | |
| KCC Mall of GenSan | Jose Catolico Sr. Avenue, Barangay Lagao, General Santos City | 53,600 | 80,000 | Headquarters | July 1, 1992 | |
| Veranza Mall GenSan | Bula - Lagao Road, Barangay Lagao, General Santos City | 21,450 | 30,000 | Branch | June 29, 2013 | |
| KCC Mall de Zamboanga | Governor Camins Avenue, Barangay Santa Maria, Zamboanga City | 162,000 | 35,000 | Branch | December 10, 2015 | |
| KCC Mall of Cotabato | Sinsuat Avenue, Barangay Rosary Heights, Cotabato City | 180,000 | 190,000 | Branch | April 2, 2025 | |

=== Future malls ===
| Name | Location | Land area (m^{2}) | Floor area (m^{2}) | Opening |
|---|---|---|---|---|
| KCC Mall of Iligan | Iligan City | 70,000 | 142,000 | TBD |
| Veranza Mall Koronadal | General Santos Drive, Barangay Concepcion, Koronadal City, South Cotabato | TBD | TBD | TBD |
| KCC Mall of Isulan | Isulan, Sultan Kudarat | TBD | TBD | TBD |
| KCC Mall of Kidapawan | Kidapawan City, Cotabato | TBD | TBD | TBD |

== Gallery ==
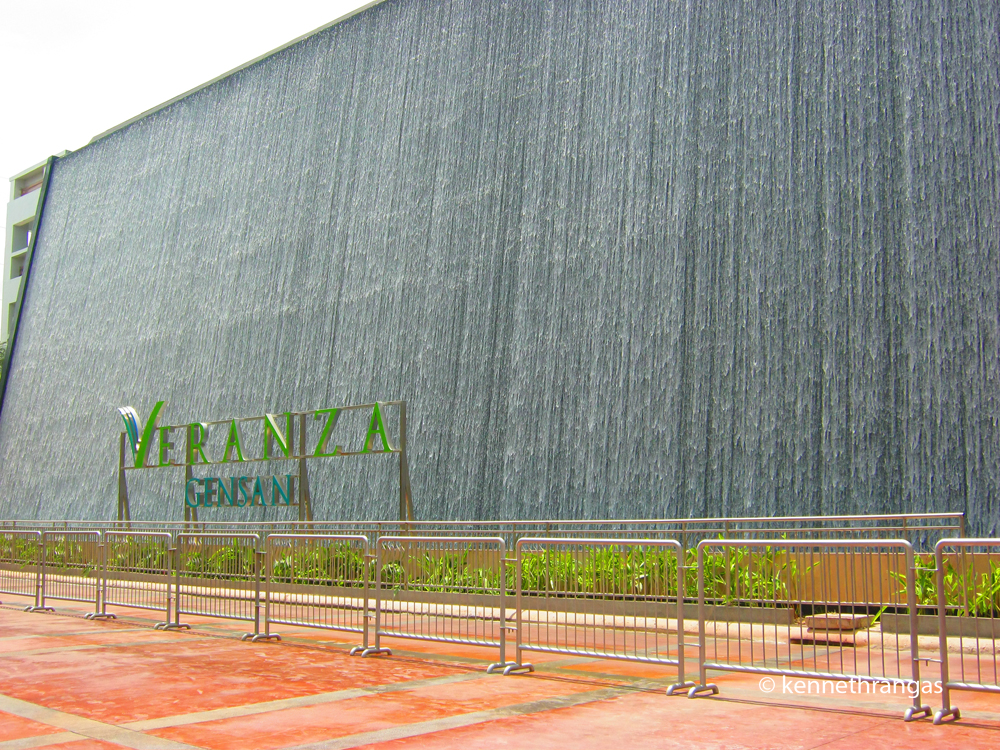
The Waterfall at Veranza Mall, one of the mall's main attraction

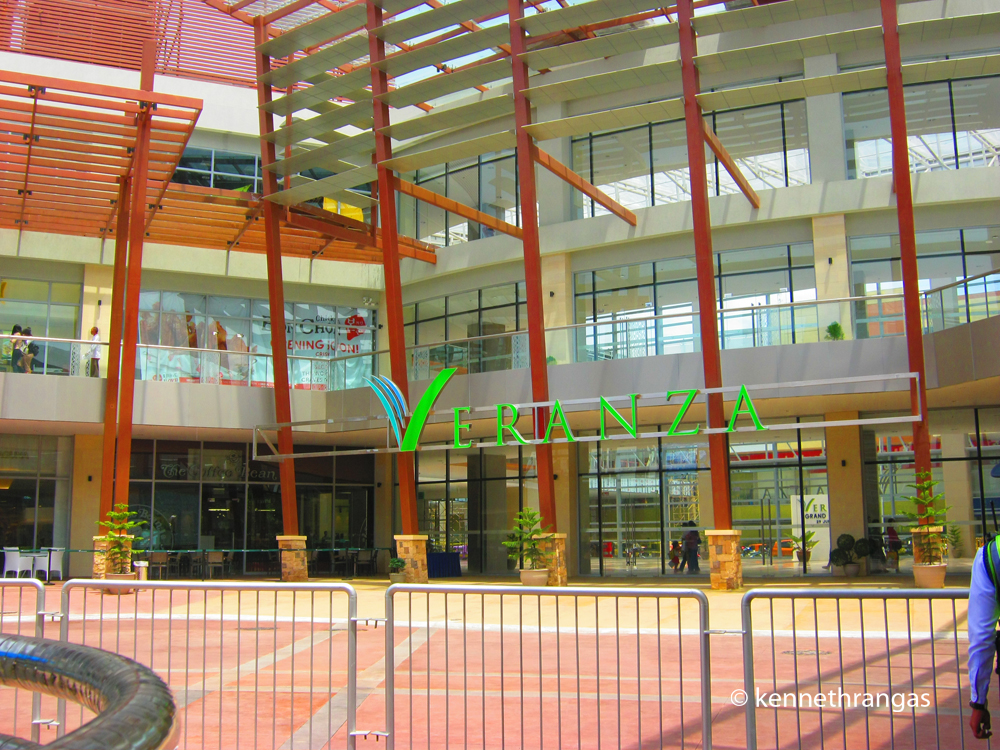
Facade of Veranza Mall

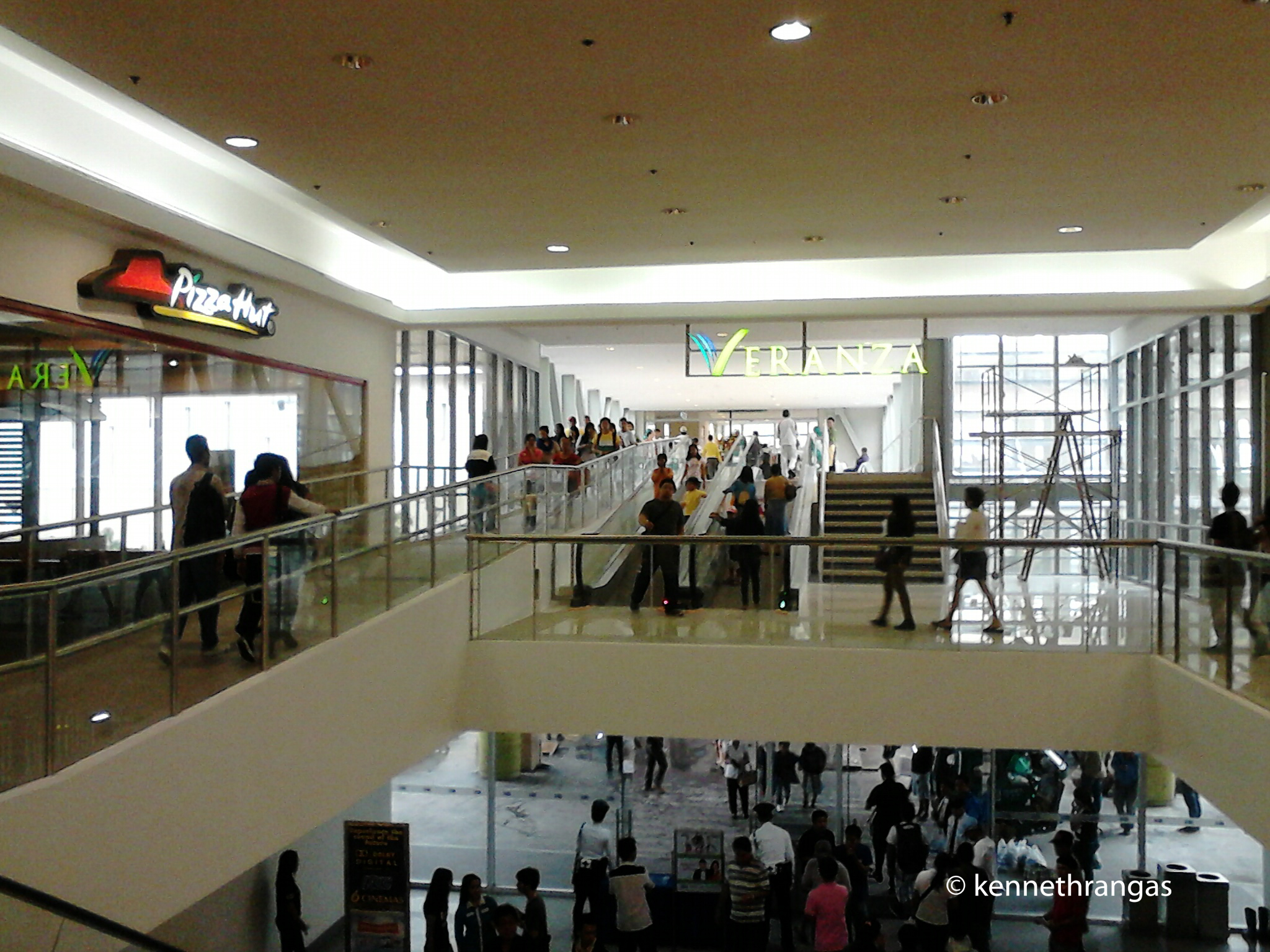
Inside Veranza Mall from its entrance

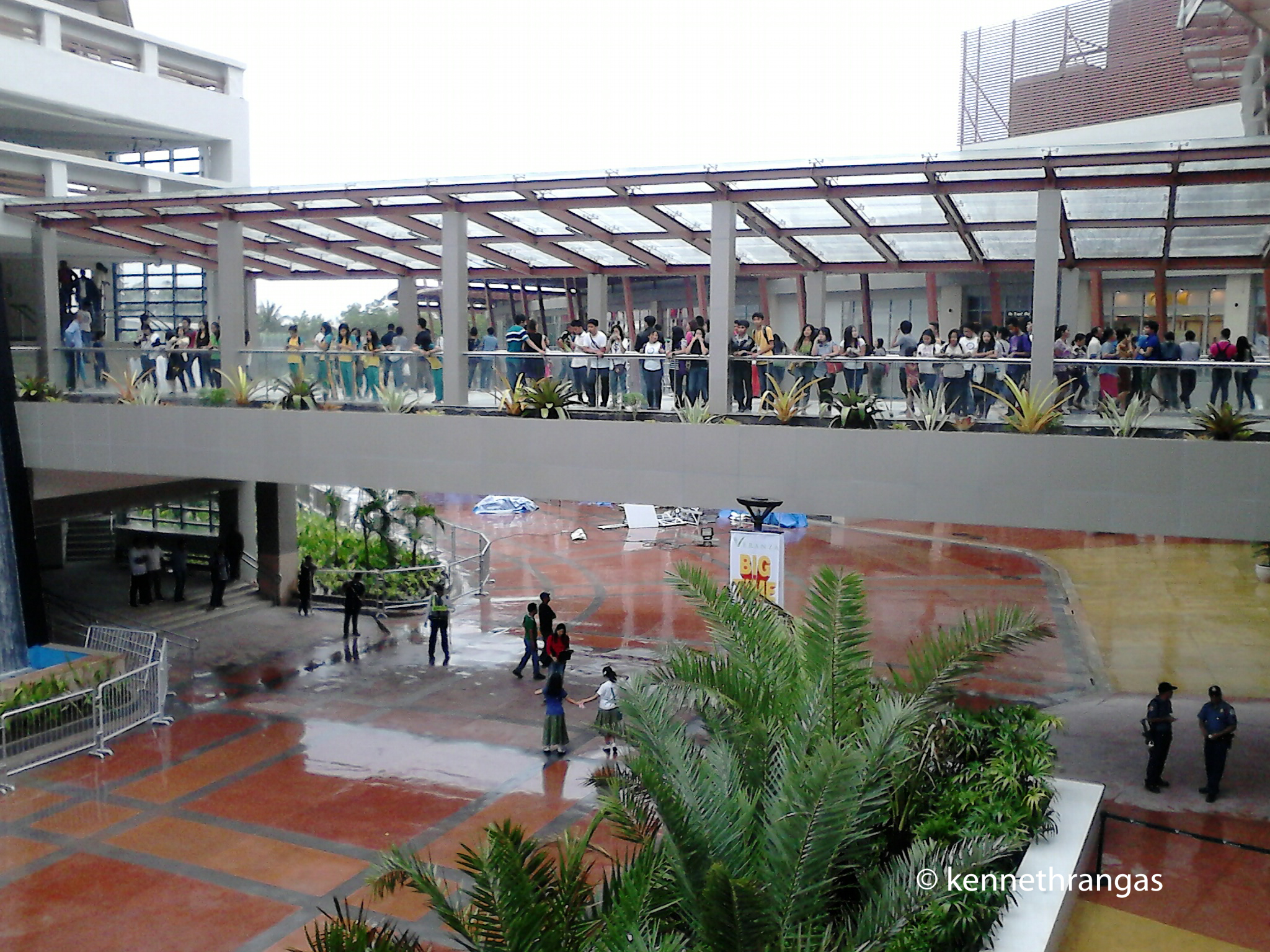
The bridgeway connecting the multi-story car park and Veranza Mall

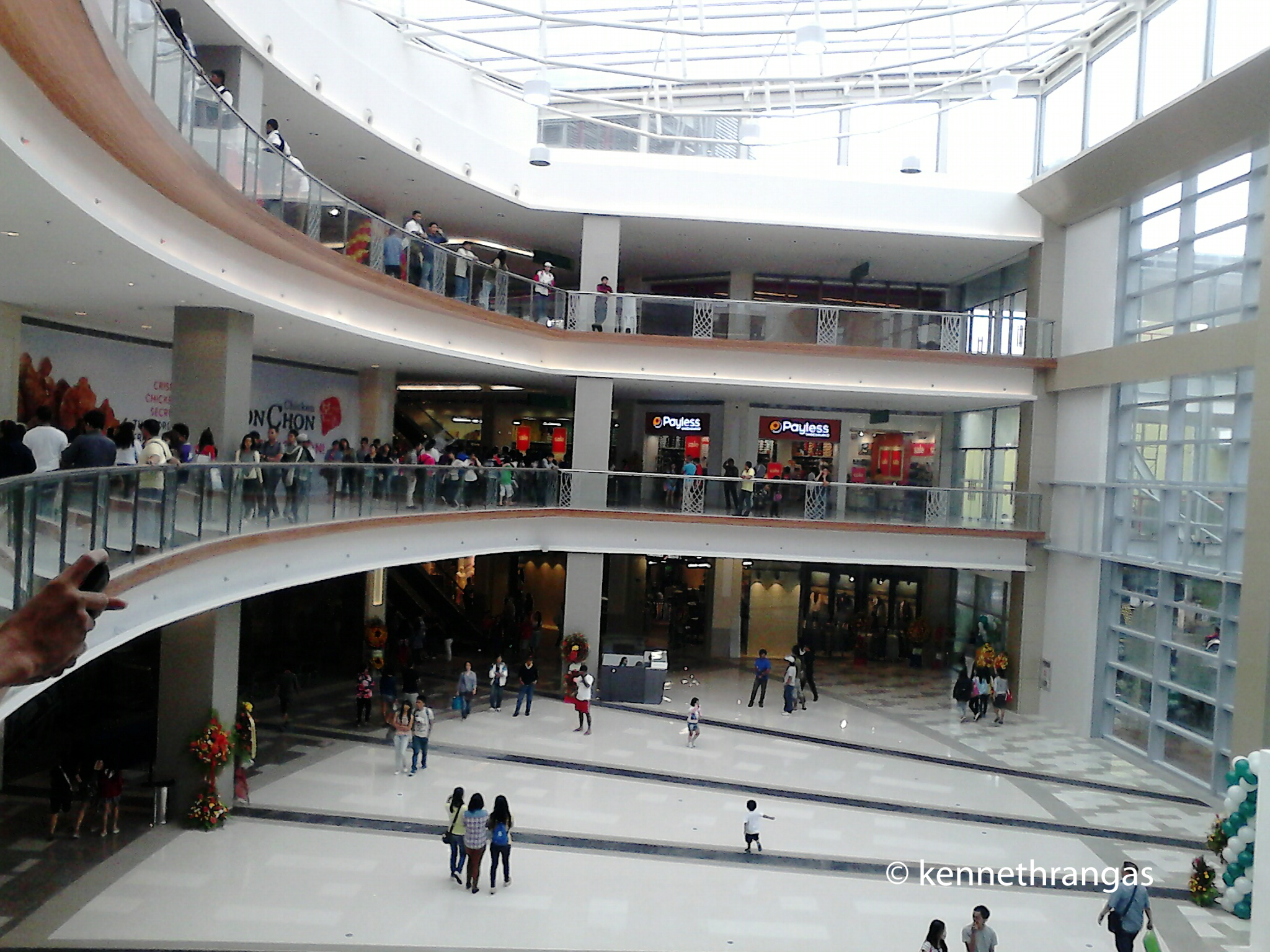
Activity Center, Veranza Mall

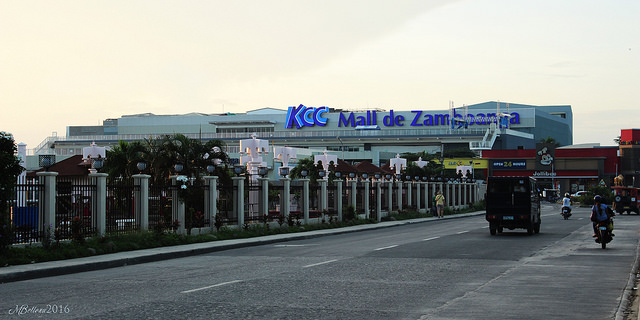
KCC Mall de Zamboanga

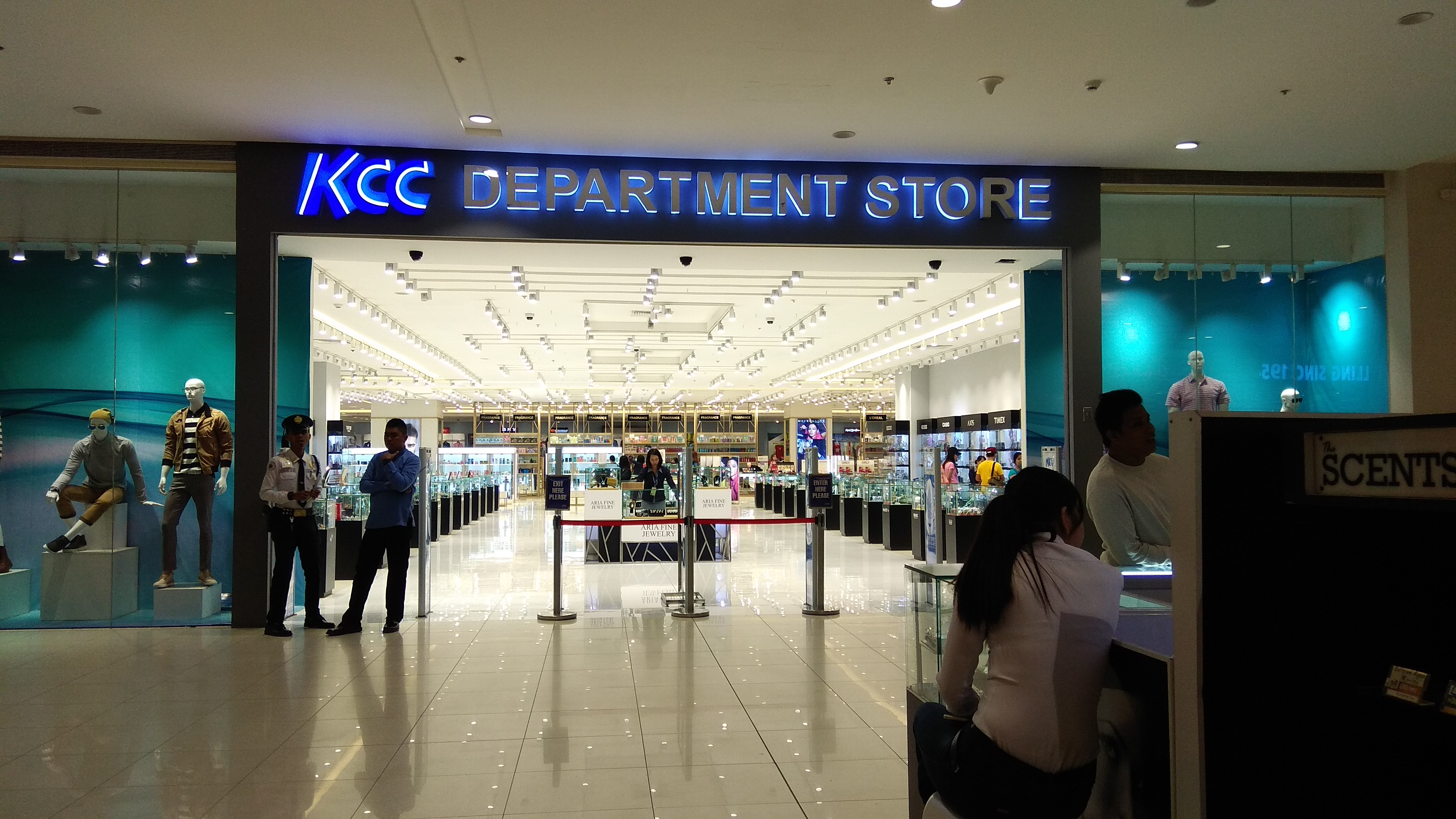
KCC Department Store, inside KCC Mall de Zamboanga

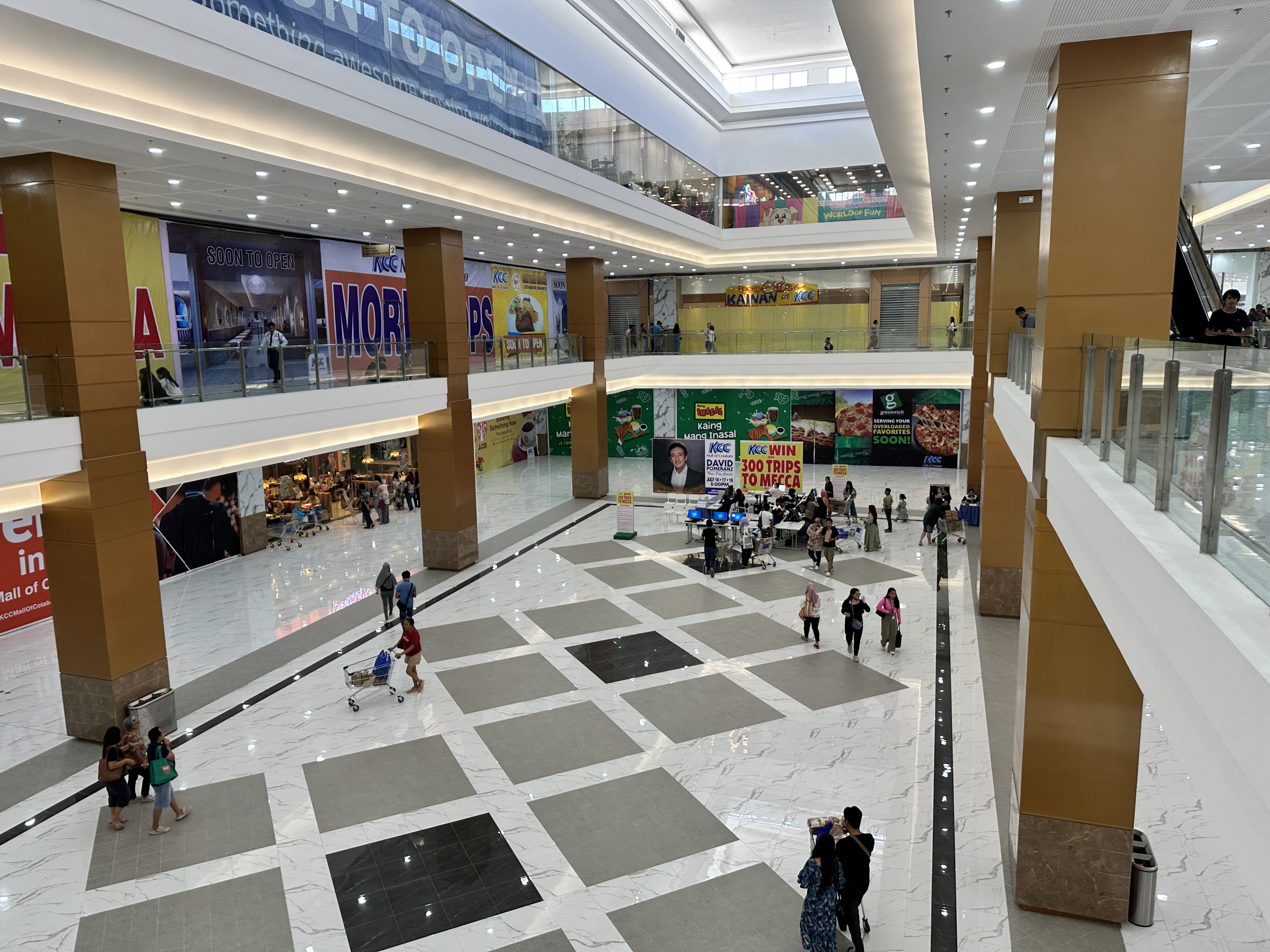
Atrium, KCC Mall of Cotabato (June 2025)

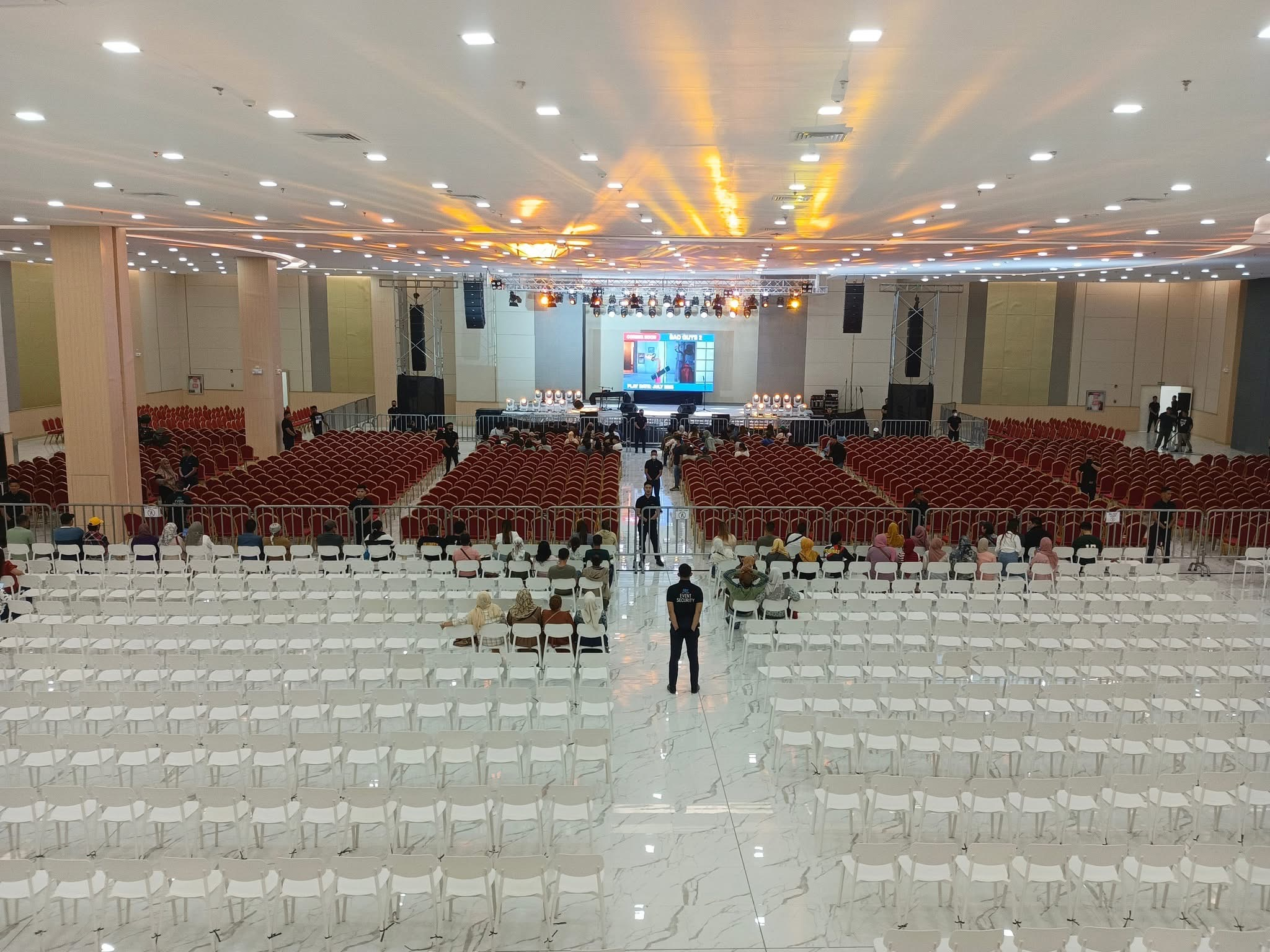
KCC Mall of Cotabato Convention Center

KCC Mall of GenSan

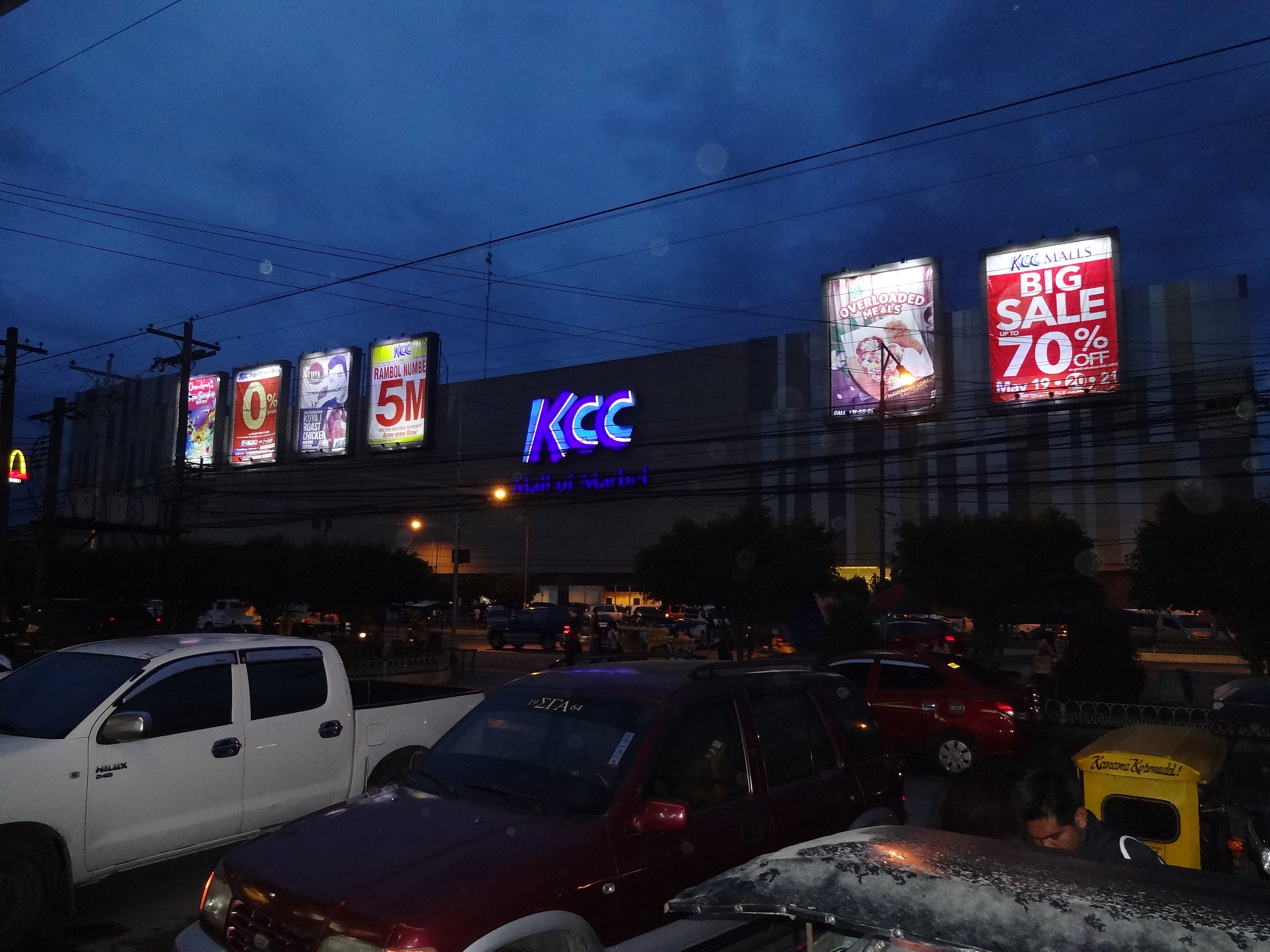
KCC Mall of Marbel at night (May 2017)
