= KCC Mall de Zamboanga =

Shopping mall in Zamboanga City, Philippines

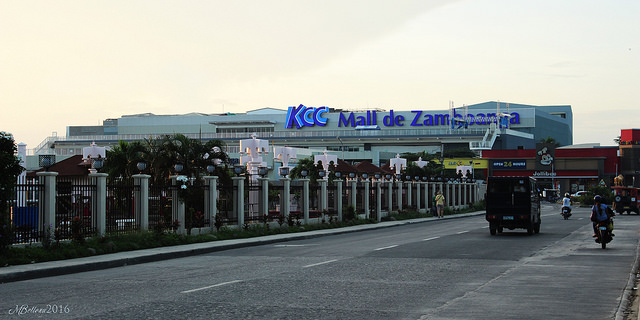
- Location: Zamboanga City, Philippines
- Coordinates: 6°55′10″N 122°04′25″E
- Address: Governor Camins Avenue, Brgy. Camino Nuevo
- Opened: Main Mall: December 10, 2015; 10 years ago East Wing: September 27, 2017; 9 years ago
- Developer: KCC Malls
- Num. of stores: 200+
- Floor area: 162,000 m^{2} (1,740,000 sq ft)
- Floors: Main Mall: 5 (including two basement levels); East Wing: 7 (including two basement levels)
- Parking: 2,100~
- Website: www.kccmalls.com

KCC Mall de Zamboanga is the third KCC Mall in the Philippines. It is owned by Koronadal Commercial Corporation (KCC) with their headquarters in General Santos. KCC Mall de Zamboanga is the 2nd biggest KCC Mall next to KCC Mall of Cotabato, and also the largest mall in Zamboanga City and in Zamboanga Peninsula. The mall is located along Gov. Camins Avenue, one of the busiest thoroughfares in the city. It has a land area of approximately 35,000 m^{2} (380,000 sq ft) and a total GFA of 162,000 m^{2} (1,740,000 sq ft).

== History and location ==
Koronadal Commercial Corporation (KCC) started in 1951 as a textile store in Koronadal City. It then expanded in 1989 into a supermarket and department store as KCC Shopping Center. KCC expanded in 1992 General Santos as KCC Warehouse Plaza, which was later renamed as KCC Mall of GenSan in 1996. With their growing profitability over the cities of Koronadal and General Santos, KCC then ventured for their expansion in other cities within Mindanao, to include the cities of Zamboanga and Cotabato.

In 2012, KCC bought a 3.5-hectare lot at Governor Camins Avenue, Zamboanga City. Along with the local government, the groundbreaking was then commenced on October 10, 2012. The massive construction, starting with the deep excavation of lands to be used as two levels down from the ground floor, was started in November 2012. With its location near the Zamboanga International Airport, KCC specialized its mall structure in order to not interfere the airport's main runway.

The mall made its grand opening on December 10, 2015.

== The Mall ==
KCC Mall de Zamboanga is a shopping mall in Zamboanga City with the main mall GFA of 120,000 m^{2} (1,300,000 ft^{2}) and is the first full-scale shopping mall in the city. It anchors KCC Supermarket with 83 check-out counters and Mindanao's largest so far, the KCC Department Store, KCC Cinema with 6 digital cinemas (including a newly renovated Cinema 6 with recliner seats), and of around 200+ tenants.

Of the tenants, most of them had set foot to Zamboanga City as Zamboanga's first, to include Yellow Cab Pizza, Kenny Rogers Roasters and Burger King which is also the first in Mindanao and many more.

=== East Wing ===
The East Wing is the mall's current expansion which is located at the eastern side of the mall. The new wing opened on September 27, 2017, with 5 storeys and basement. Once opened, Since KCC Mall de Zamboanga's East Wing is opened it is the fifth largest mall in Mindanao next to SM CDO Downtown. The expansion features two levels of shopping connected to the main mall, a Convention Center, and additional parking spaces.

== Fire incident ==
Around 4:07 p.m. on August 12, 2023, a 50-minute fire tore through the Burger King fast-food chain inside the mall. Witnesses reported that the fire originated from the fast-food chain's exhauster, which released a black smoke. At 4:07 p.m., the Zamboanga City Disaster Risk Reduction Management Office (ZCDRRMO), the Zamboanga City Police Office (ZCPO), and the Bureau of Fire Protection (BFP) are on the scene and helped put out the fire, while a concerned citizen called the ZCPO at 4:10 p.m. There have apparently been pushbacks from mall patrons, but no deaths or injuries have been reported. The BFP estimated that the property damage was worth ₱1.6 million and declared the fire out at 4:57 p.m. At 6:09 p.m., KCC Mall de Zamboanga released a statement via their Facebook page. to notify that the day after the incident, the mall is closed. After the recent event, the mall reopened the next day and Burger King's refurbished location began repairs before reopening it months later.

== Gallery ==
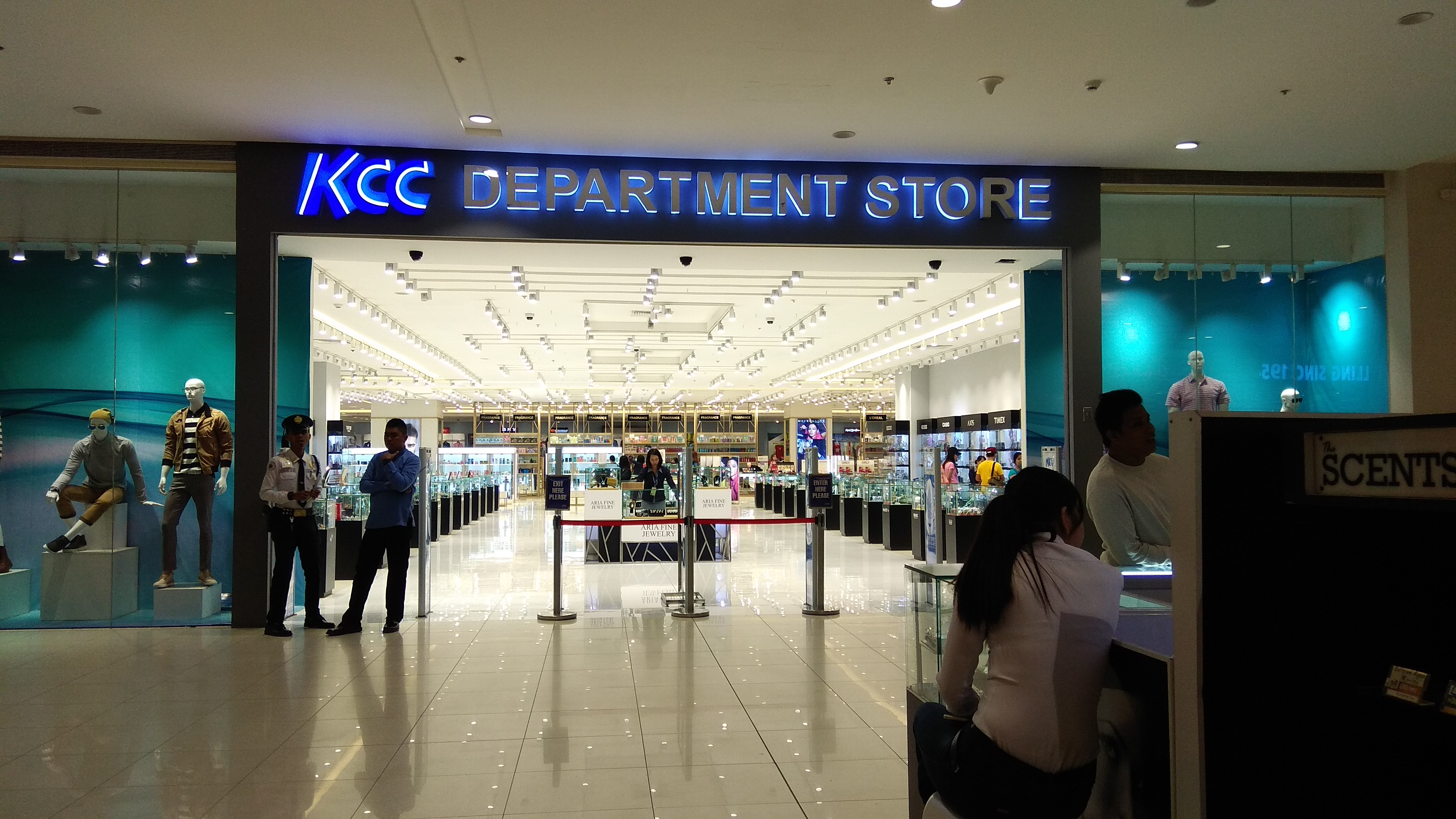
Storefront of KCC Department Store of KCC Mall de Zamboanga

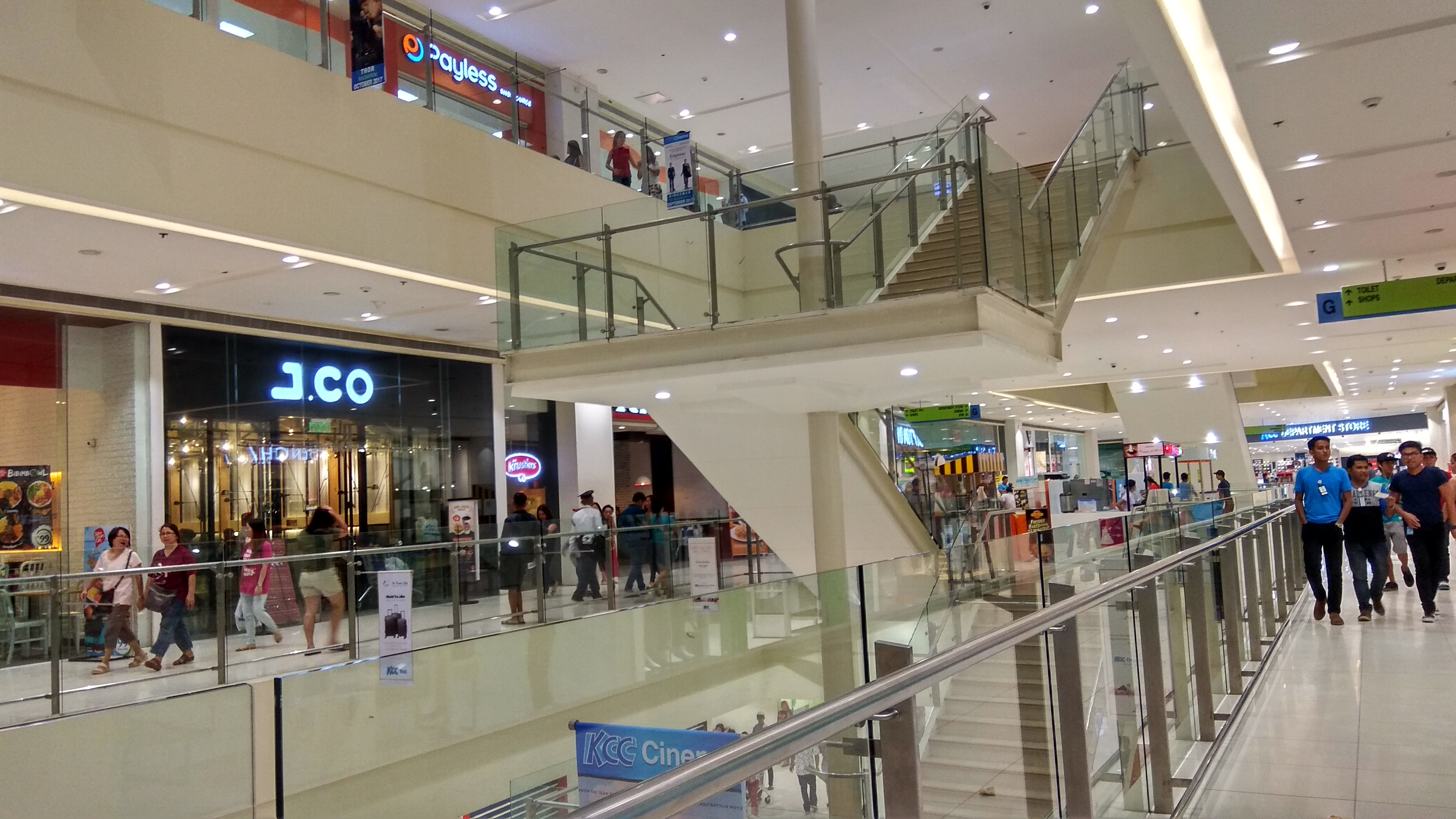
Inside KCC Mall de Zamboanga

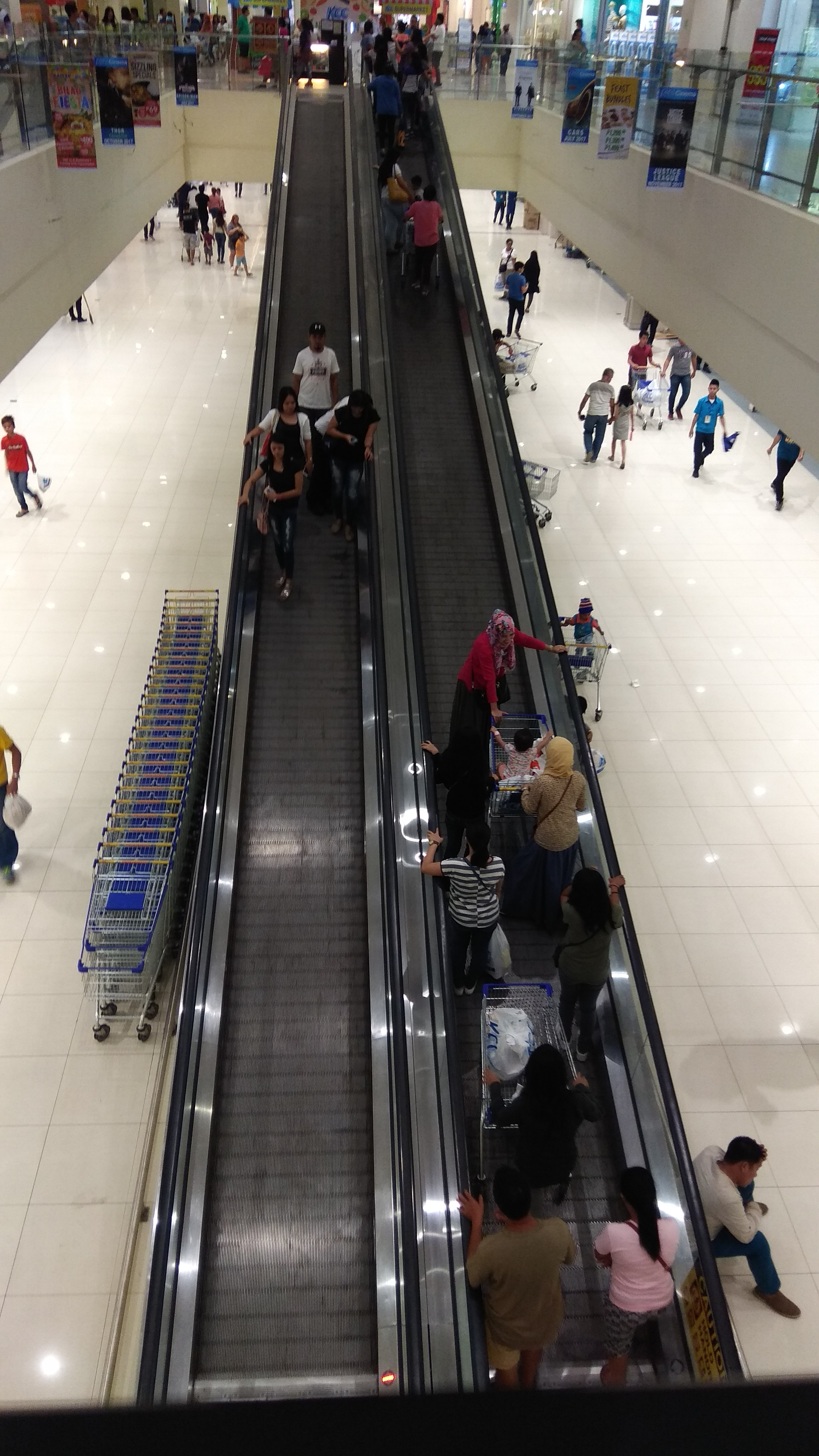
The walkalator, an access to the Basement 1 of the mall

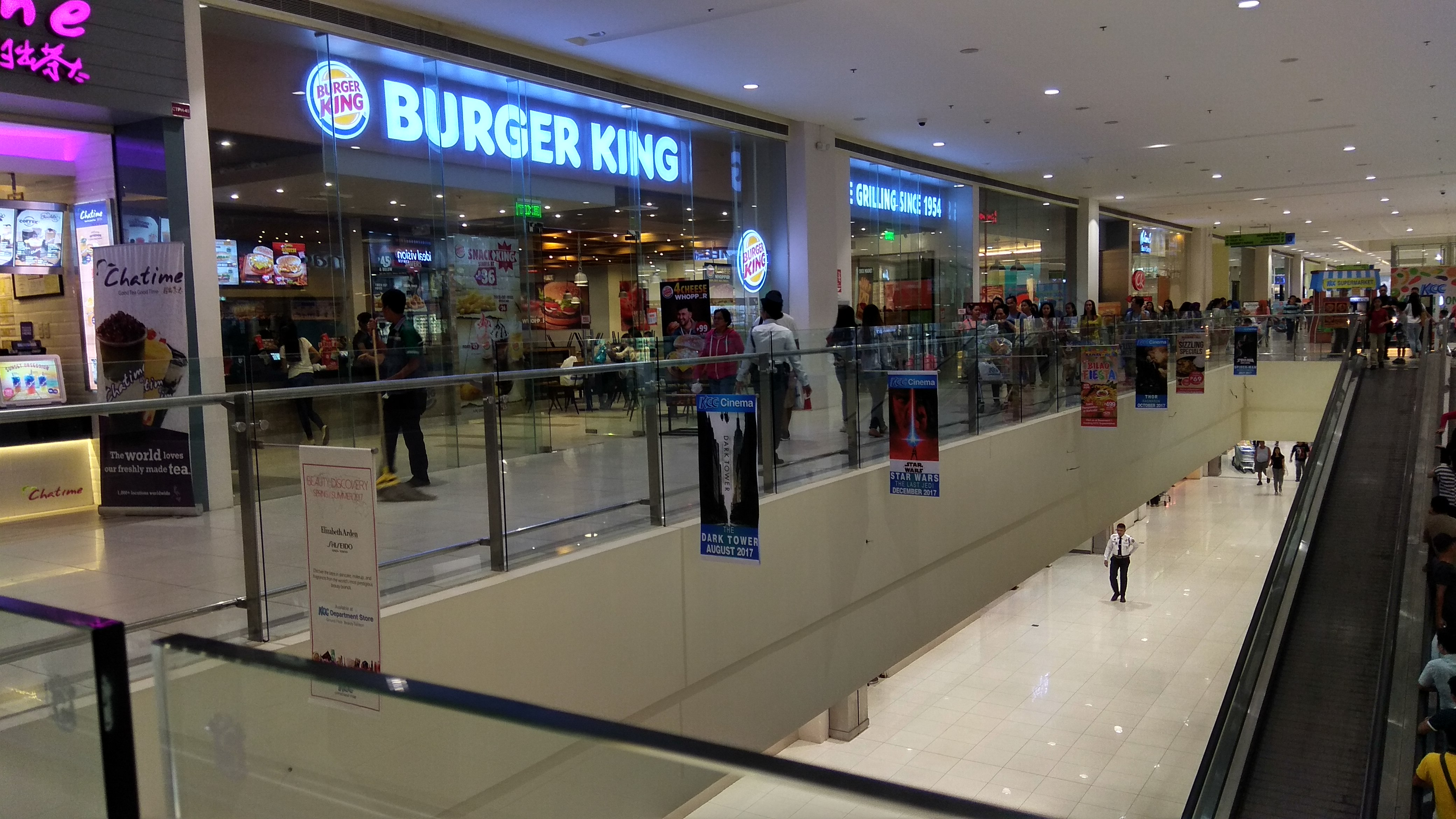
Burger King store, the first in Mindanao

== See also ==
- KCC Malls
- SM City Zamboanga
- KCC Mall of Cotabato
