= SM Center Dagupan =

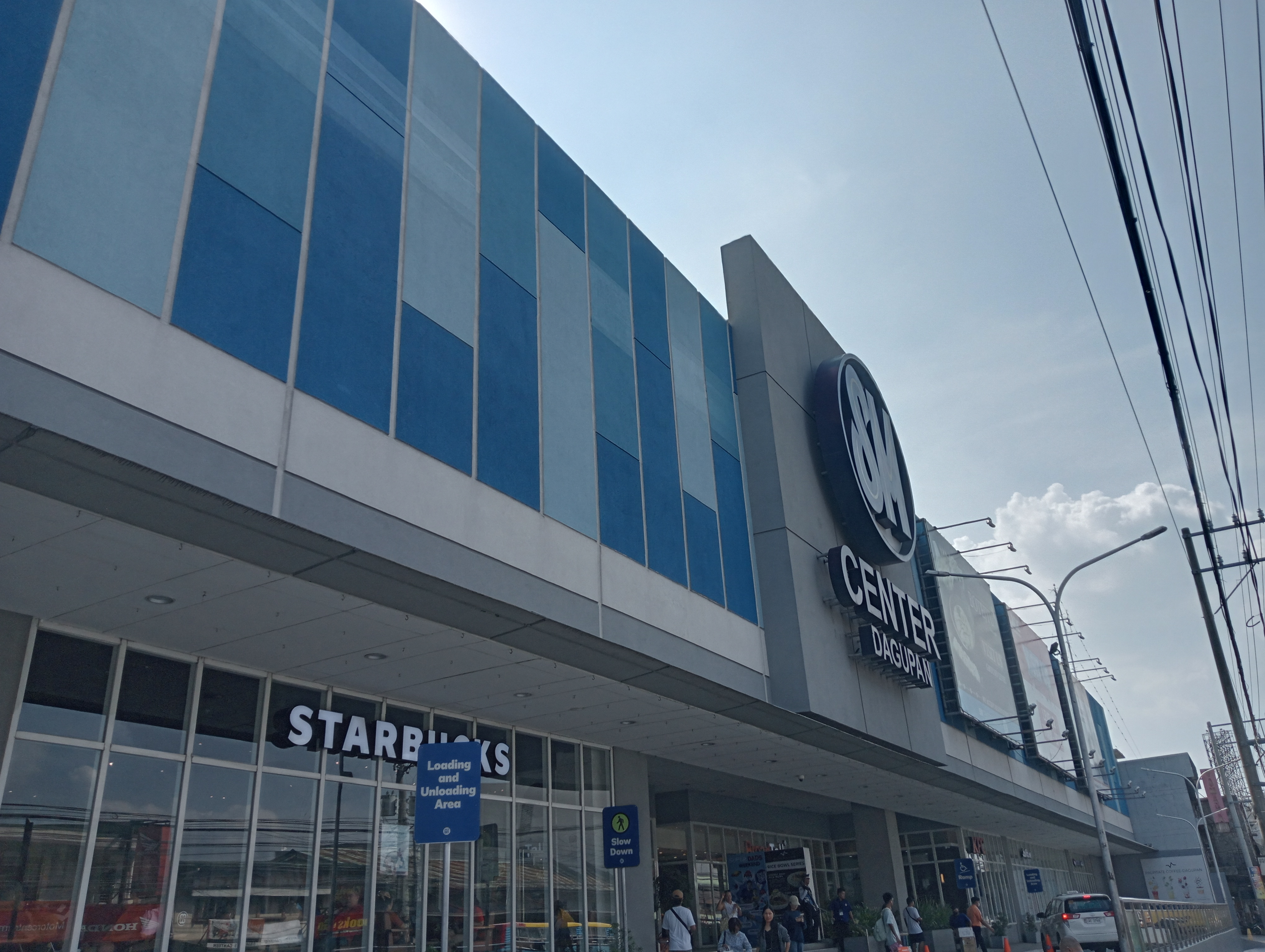
- The facade of SM Center Dagupan in June 2024
- Location: Dagupan, Pangasinan
- Coordinates: 16.0443°N 120.3437°E
- Address: M.H. Del Pilar, Dagupan, Pangasinan
- Opened: October 4, 2019; 7 years ago
- Developer: SM Prime Holdings
- Manager: SM Prime Holdings
- Owner: Henry Sy, Sr.
- Floor area: 23,000 m (75,000 ft)
- Website: SM Center Dagupan

SM Center Dagupan is a shopping mall owned and operated by SM Prime Holdings. It is located at M.H. Del Pilar cor. Herrero Road, Dagupan, Pangasinan. It is the third SM Mall in Pangasinan, after SM City Rosales and SM City Urdaneta Central and the first SM Supermall in Dagupan.

Preceded by SM City Olongapo Central	74th SM Supermall; 2019	Succeeded by SM City Butuan
