= SM City Cabanatuan =

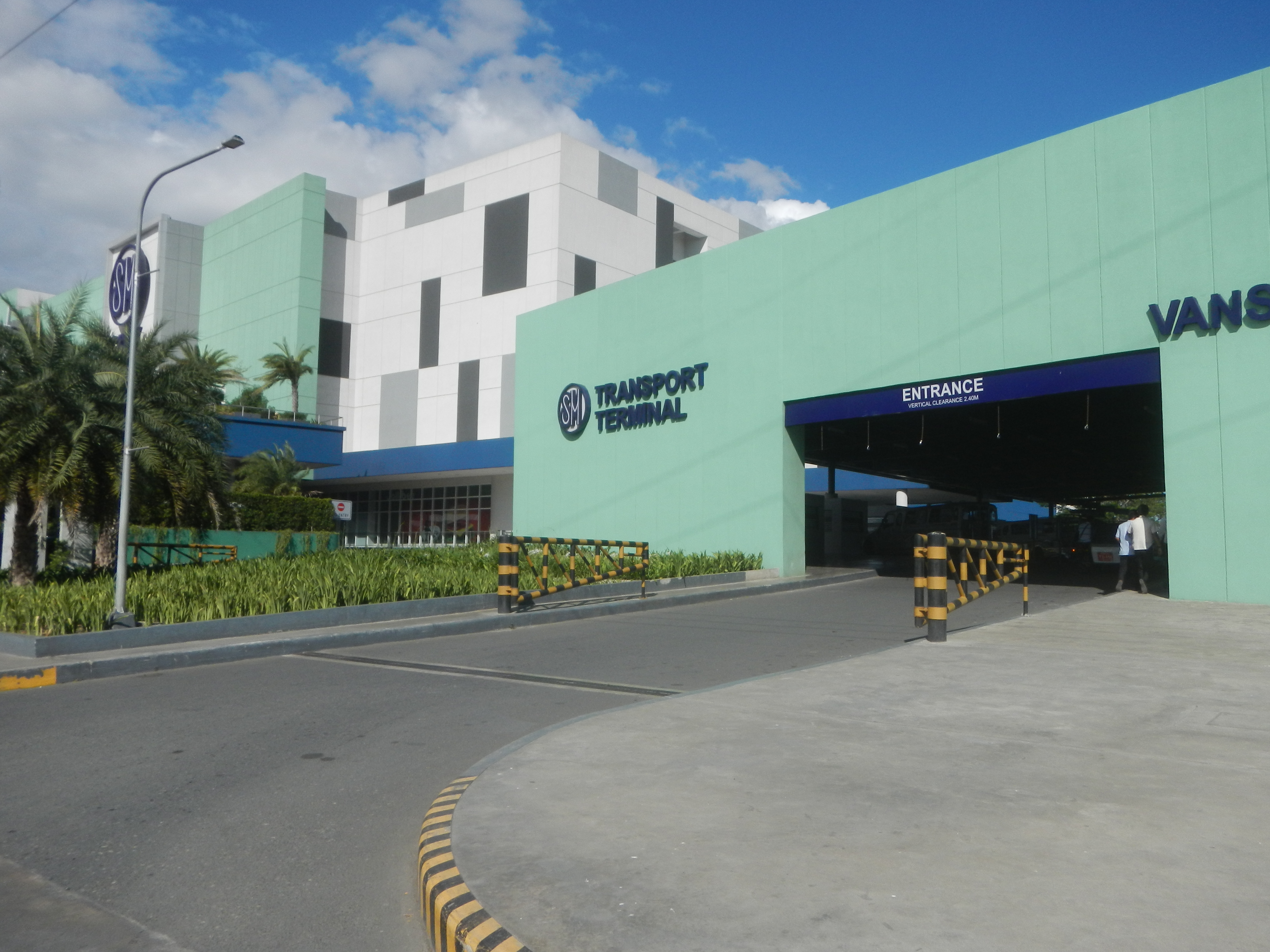
- The facade of SM City Cabanatuan
- Location: Cabanatuan, Nueva Ecija, Philippines
- Coordinates: 15°28′01″N 120°57′16″E
- Address: Brgy. Hermogenes Concepcion, Cabanatuan, Nueva Ecija
- Opened: October 9, 2015; 11 years ago
- Developer: SM Prime Holdings
- Manager: SM Prime Holdings
- Floor area: 154,020 m^{2} (1,657,900 sq ft)
- Floors: 5
- Parking: 2,077 slots
- Website: SM City Cabanatuan

SM City Cabanatuan is a shopping mall owned by SM Prime Holdings with a gross floor area of 154,020 m^{2} (1,657,900 sq ft). It is the second SM Supermall in Cabanatuan City and Nueva Ecija after the acquisition of Megacenter by SM Supermalls. It is located along Brgy. Hermogenes Concepcion, Cabanatuan City, Nueva Ecija, Philippines.

It is the third largest SM mall in Luzon outside the Greater Manila Area, and the second largest in Central Luzon based on total retail floor area, after SM City Clark. When it opened in 2015, it was the largest mall in North Luzon outside of Metro Manila, until being recently dethroned due to the expansion of SM City Baguio and SM City Clark.

== Location ==
SM City Cabanatuan is located along Maharlika Highway (also known as Pan-Philippine Highway), Barangay Hermogenes Concepcion, Cabanatuan. The mall is also adjacent to a portion of the 12.35-kilometer Emilio Vergara Highway.

== Planning ==
After a 10-year negotiation in 2012, The SM Group pushed the plan to build a new mall in Cabanatuan. The SM Group has been eyeing setting up SM City Cabanatuan since 2002, but the negotiations within the city government said it was reportedly due to stiff opposition from other local mall operators. SM Prime Executive Vice President Jeffrey Lim denied there was any opposition to the development in Cabanatuan. The SM Group eventually transferred the mall site to an 8.5-hectare commercial site along the National Highway in Barangay Hermogenes Concepcion, which became available in 2009, according to the company executive.

The construction of SM City Cabanatuan was planned to begin in 2012, but it only commenced around 2013. The mall then finally opened to the public on October 9, 2015.

== Features ==
The mall anchors The SM Store, SM Supermarket, Ace Hardware, SM Appliance Center, Watson's, The Body Shop, Uniqlo, and numerous other major local and international branches and stalls. The mall features six state-of-the-art cinemas with a seating capacity of 1,807, including a large format theater (which is the Cinema 4) capable for 3D movies, and a stadium type seating similar to IMAX that houses up to 507 guests.

In 2017, the mall installed solar panels on rooftops similar to SM City North EDSA and SM Mall of Asia with a power of 8.9 megawatts (MW) total capacity along with SM City Cauayan and SM City Iloilo.

=== Sky Garden and Roof Park ===
SM City Cabanatuan includes two Sky Gardens – the Garden Park, which provides covered shelter; and the Roof Park located at the fourth level. The Garden Park is a long, elevated garden park which opened the same day as the mall's grand opening. The Roof Park features an indoor fountain, open playgrounds, pet areas, and mall tenants as well.

=== SMX Cabanatuan ===
An under-construction private venue for trade events, industry conventions, corporate functions, and international exhibitions under the SM Hotels & Conventions Corporation (SMHCC). It will be located in the fourth floor of the mall, opening in the future. It is speculated to house at least 4,000 to 8,000 people when completed.

Paw Park

Located at the 4th level of the mall, SM City Cabanatuan also features a Paw Park for pets to roam around and play and has been used for various pet events and pet gatherings.

== Gallery ==
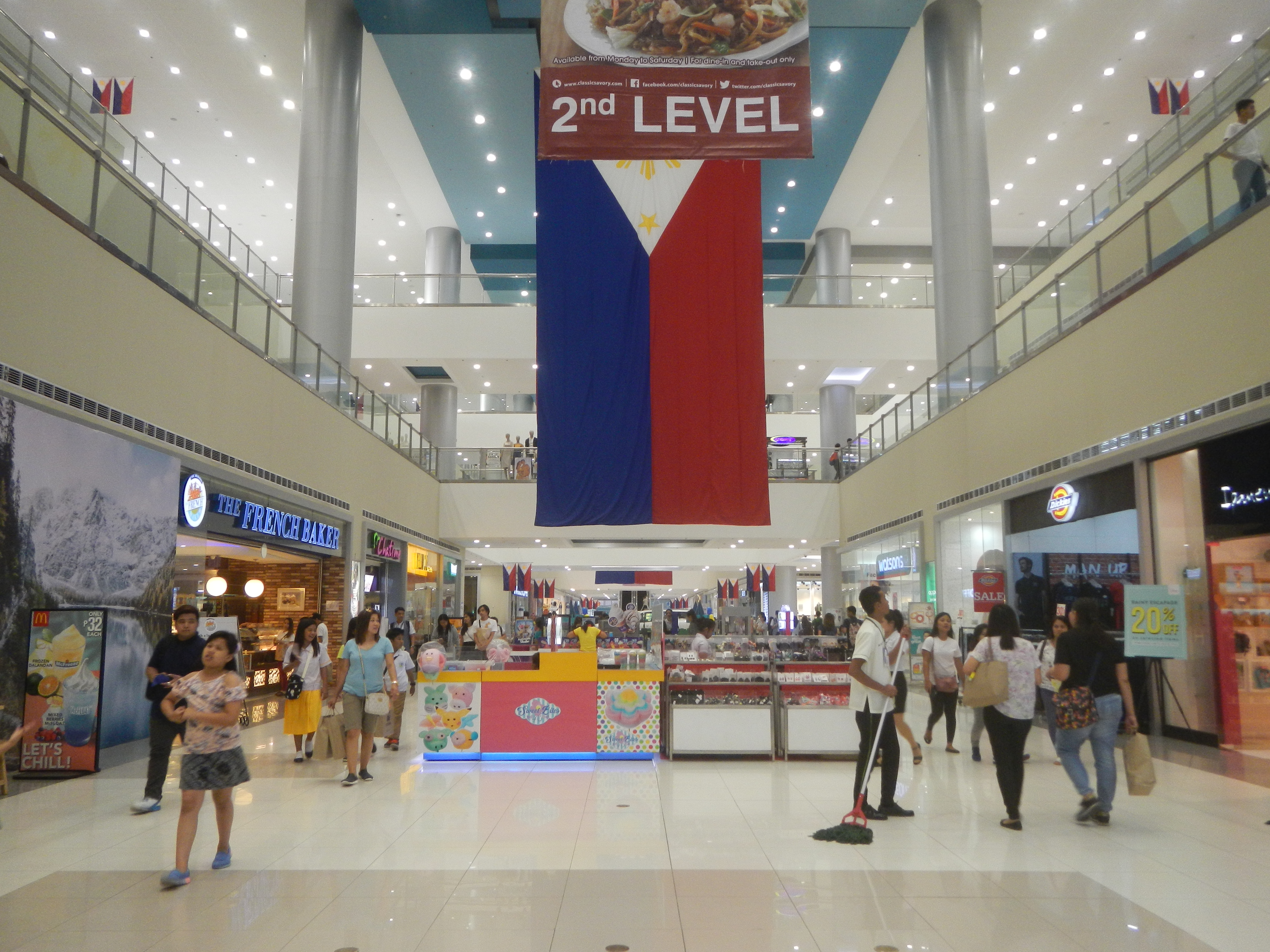
Main Interior of SM City Cabanatuan

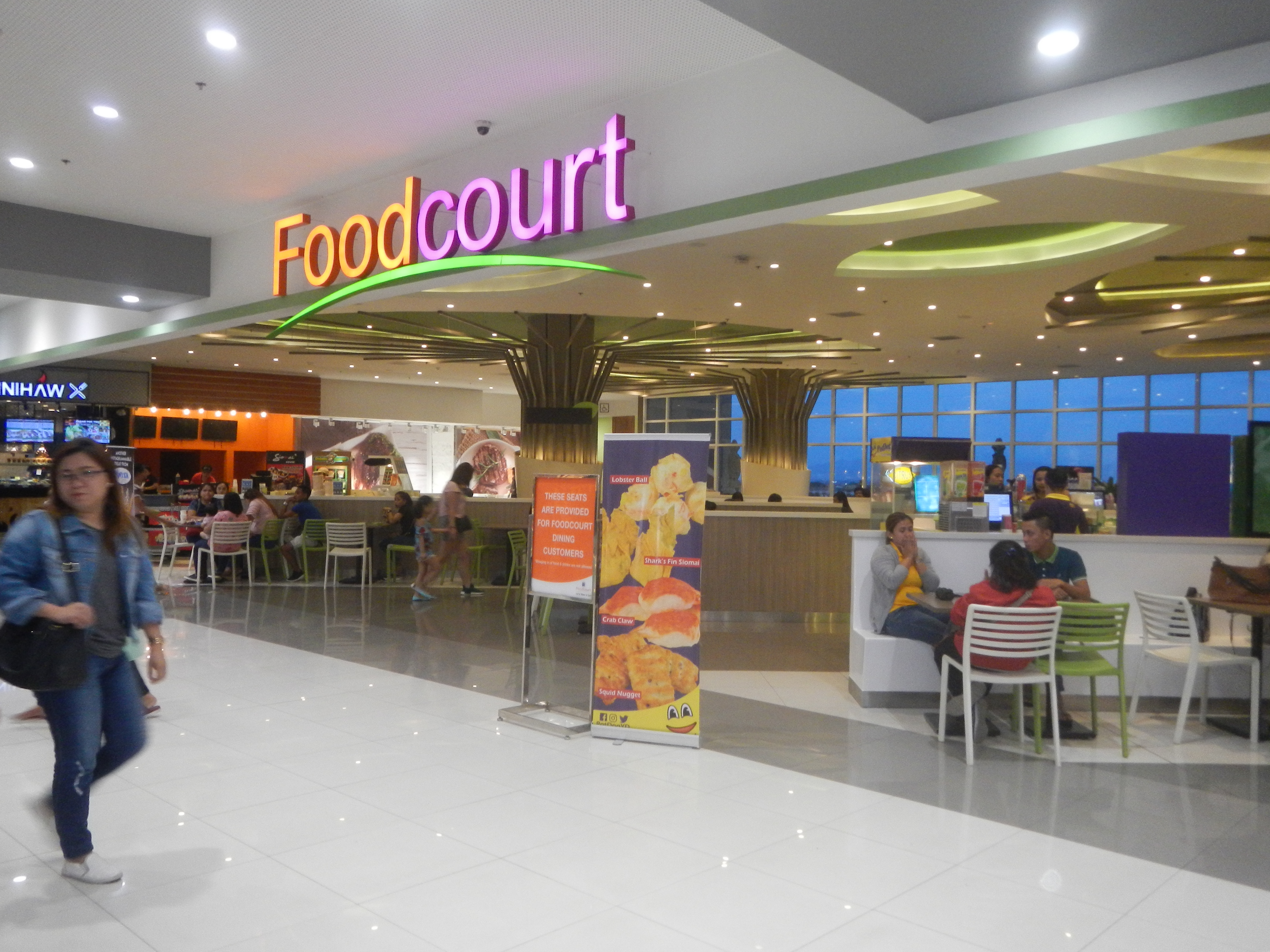
SM Food Court

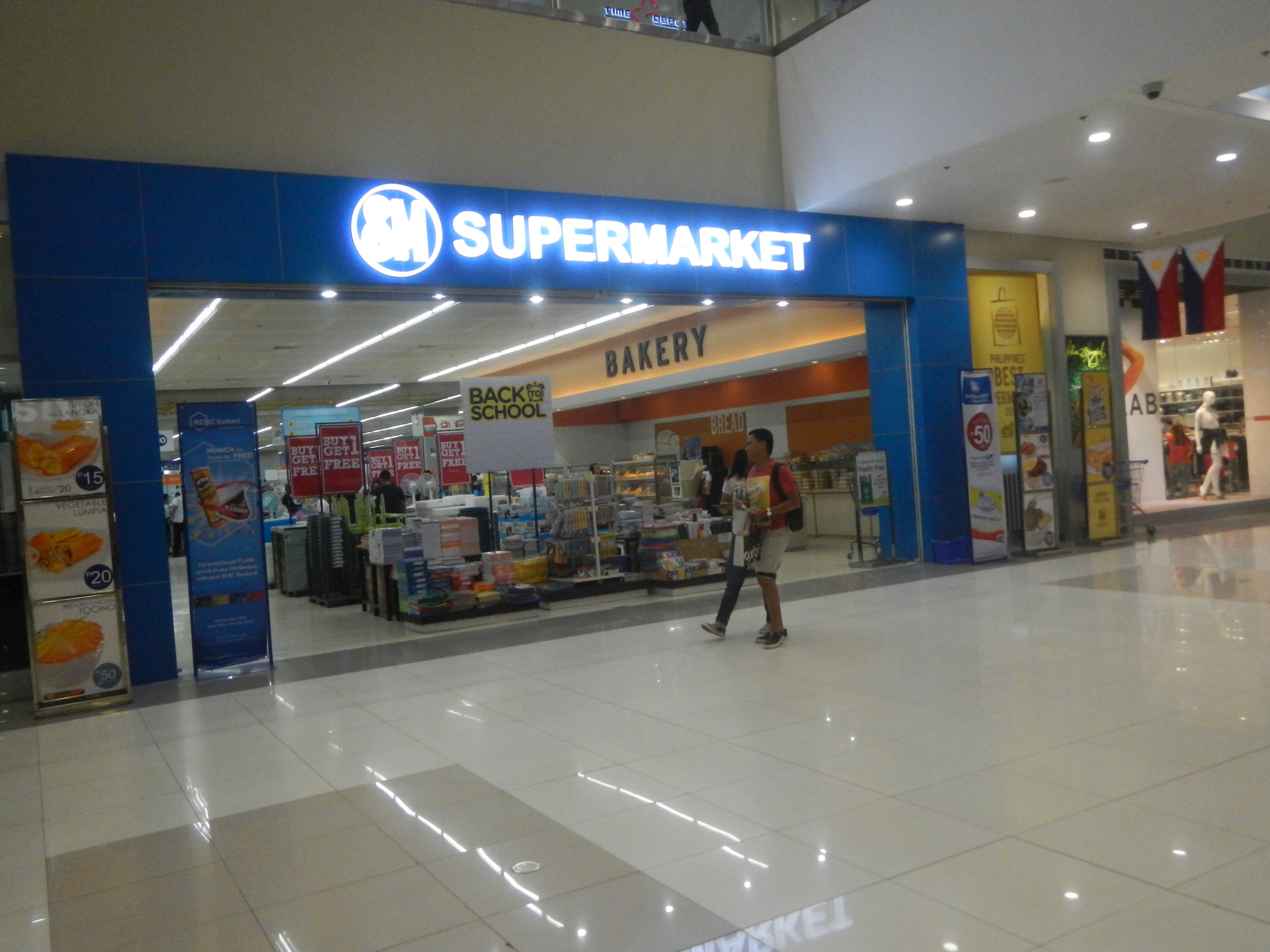
SM Supermarket

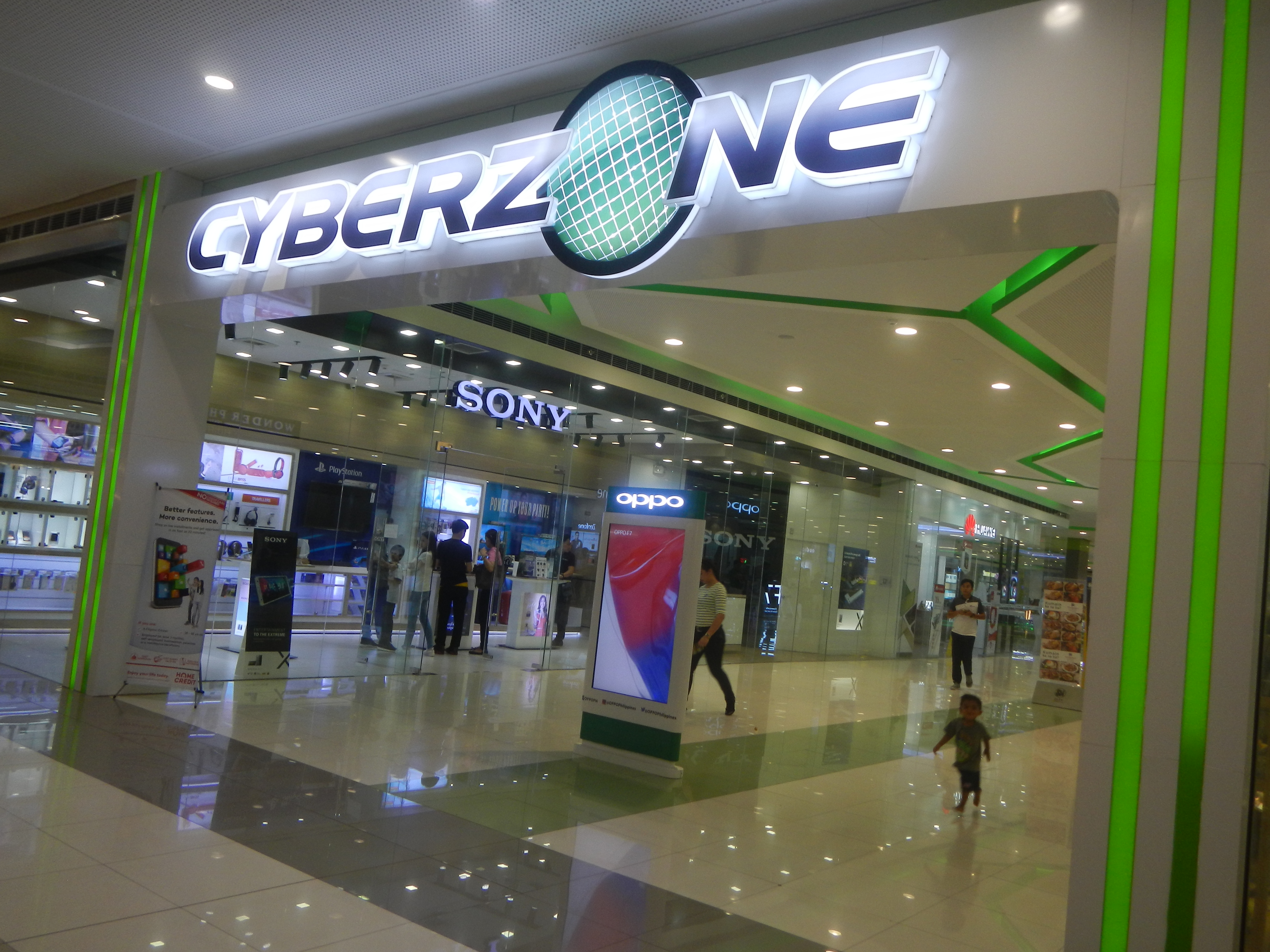
SM Cyberzone

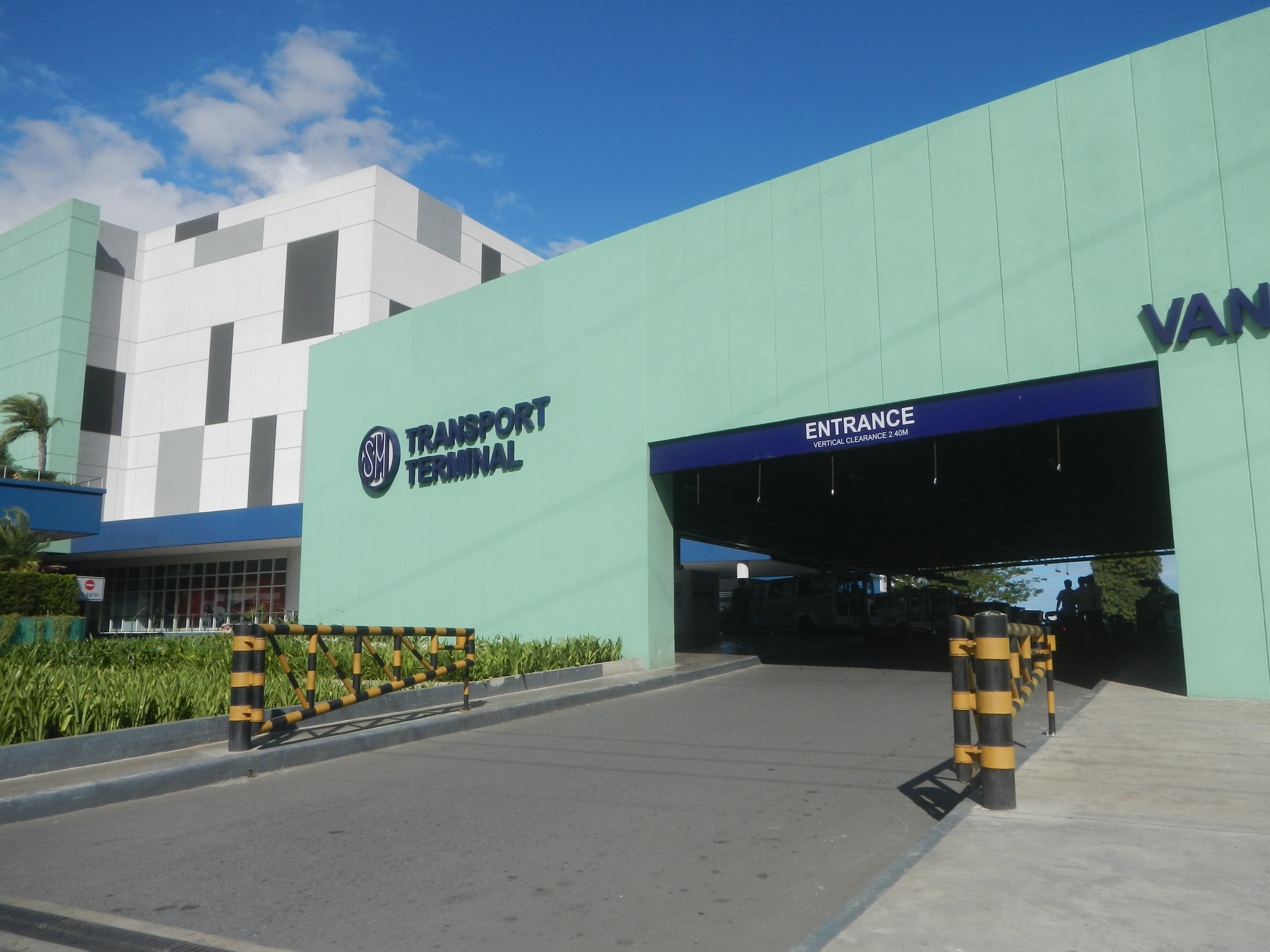
SM Grand Transport Terminal

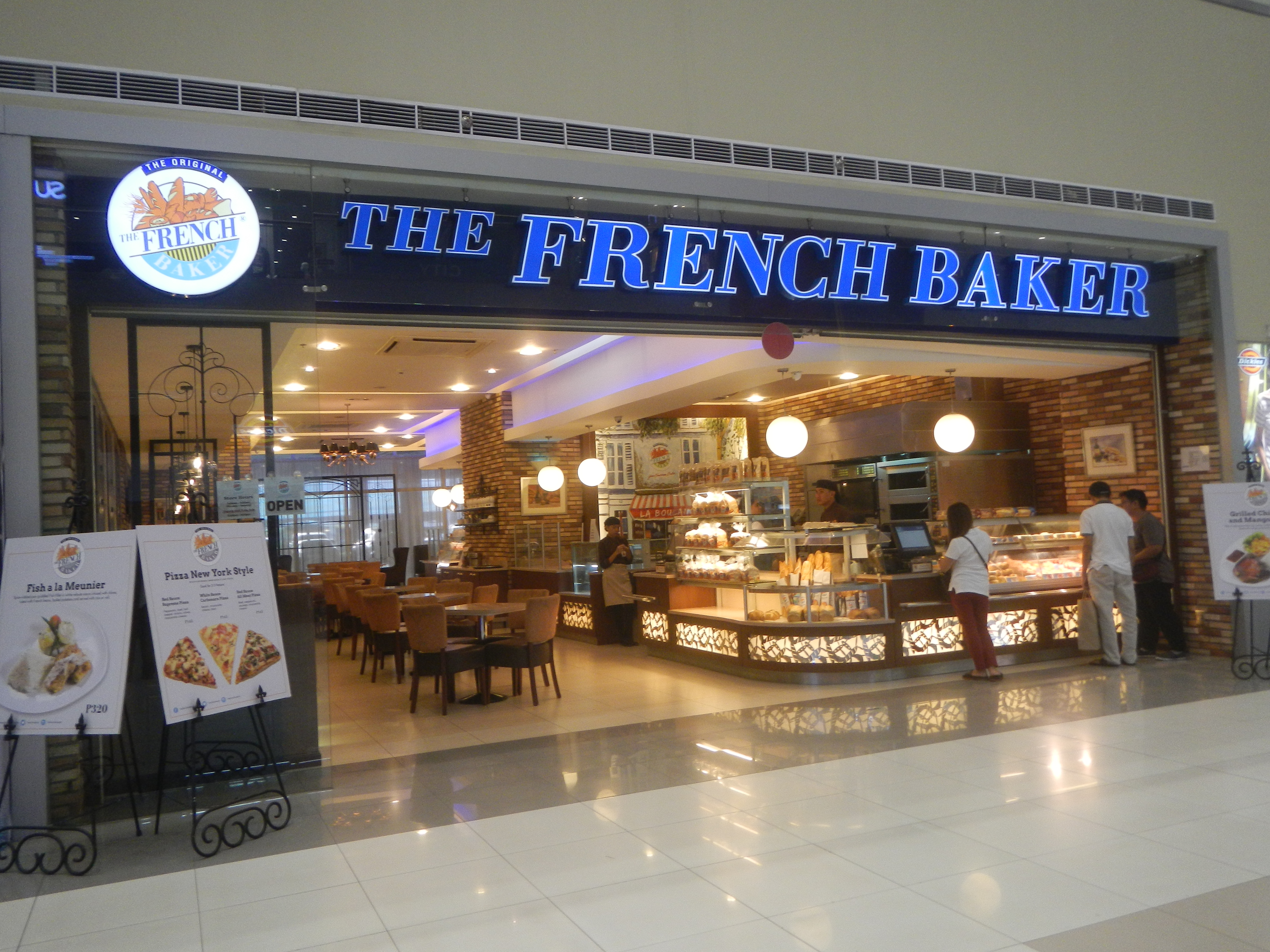
The French Baker

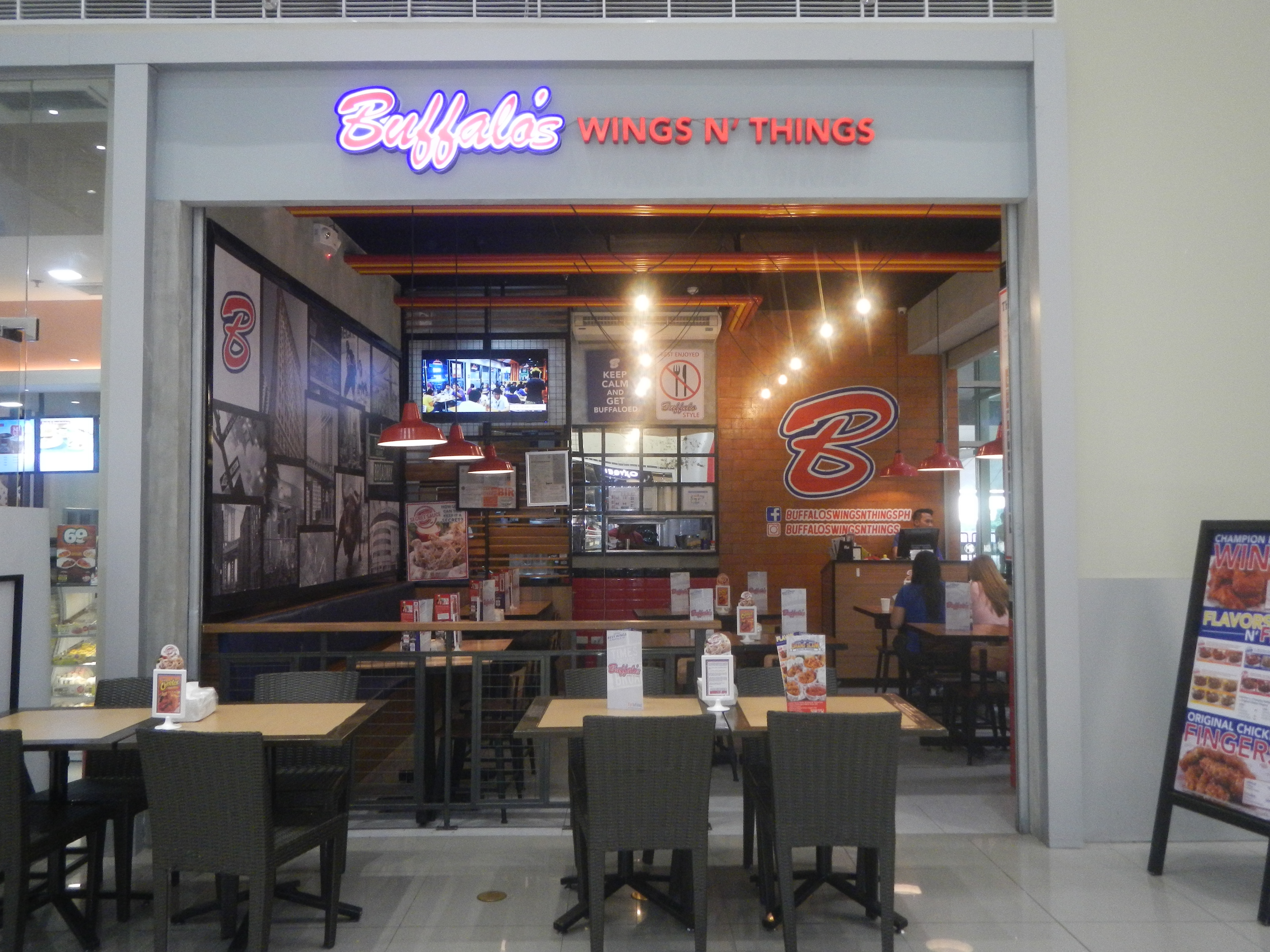
Buffalo Wings N' Things

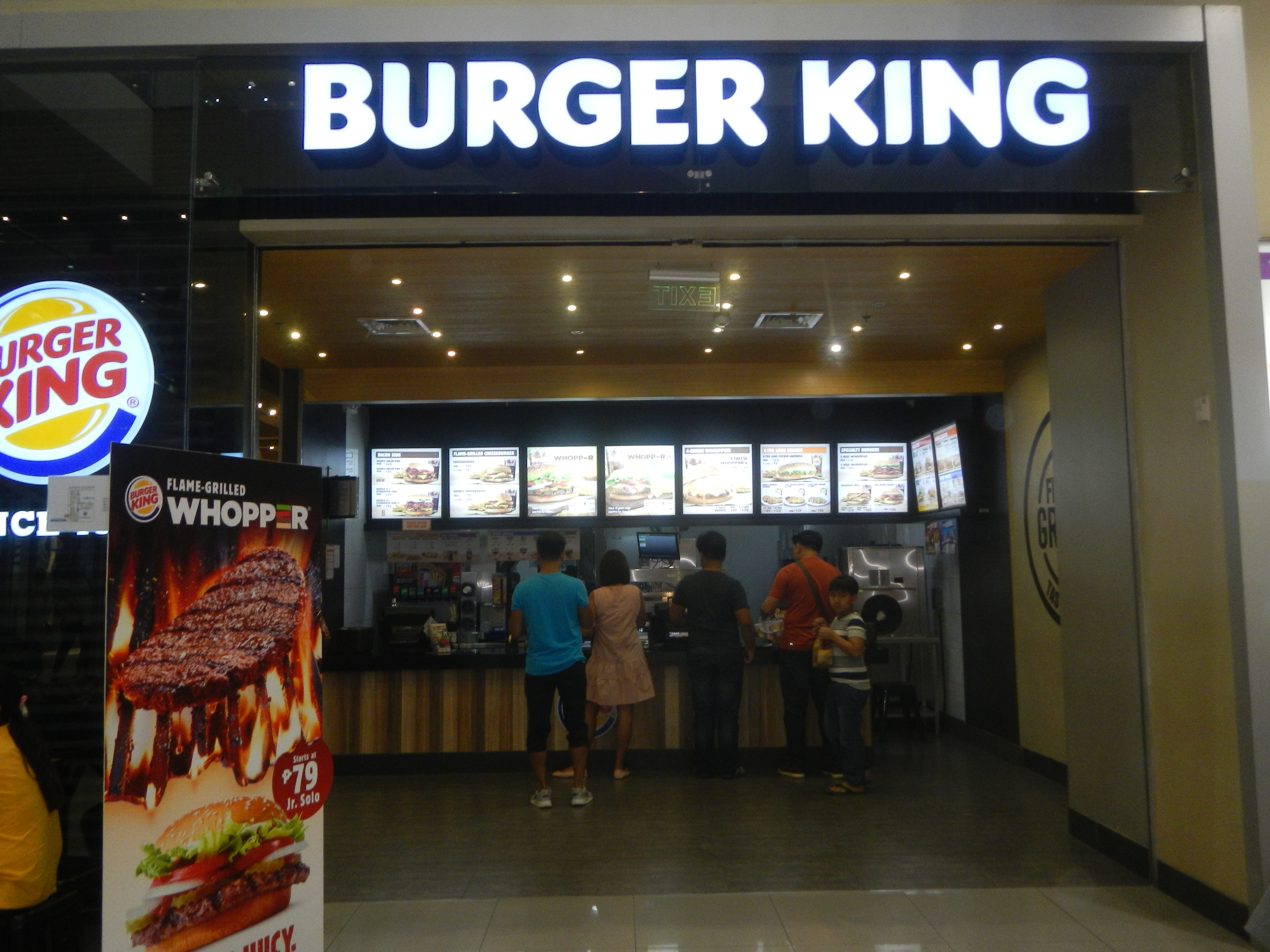
Burger King

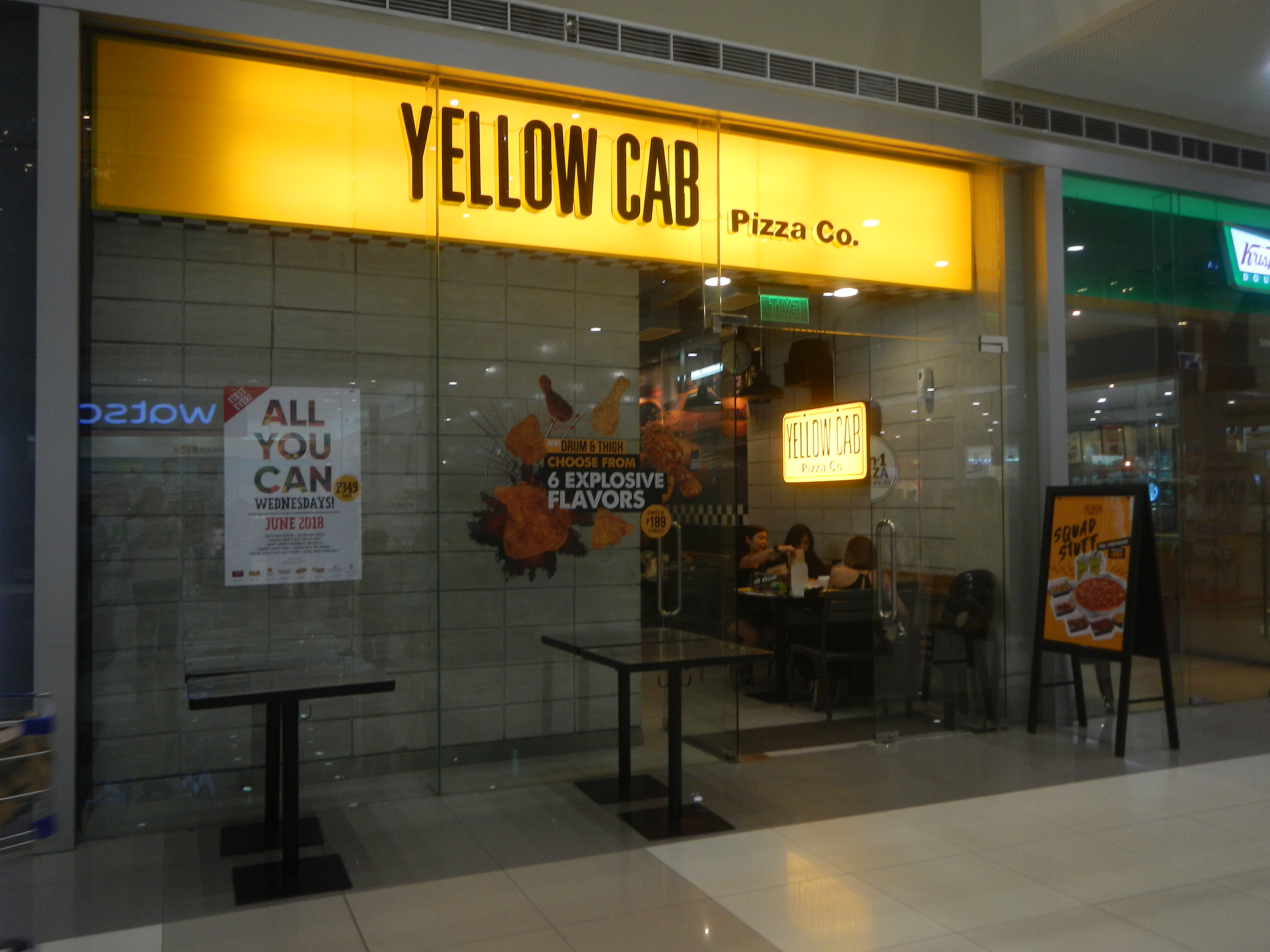
Yellow Cab Pizza Co.

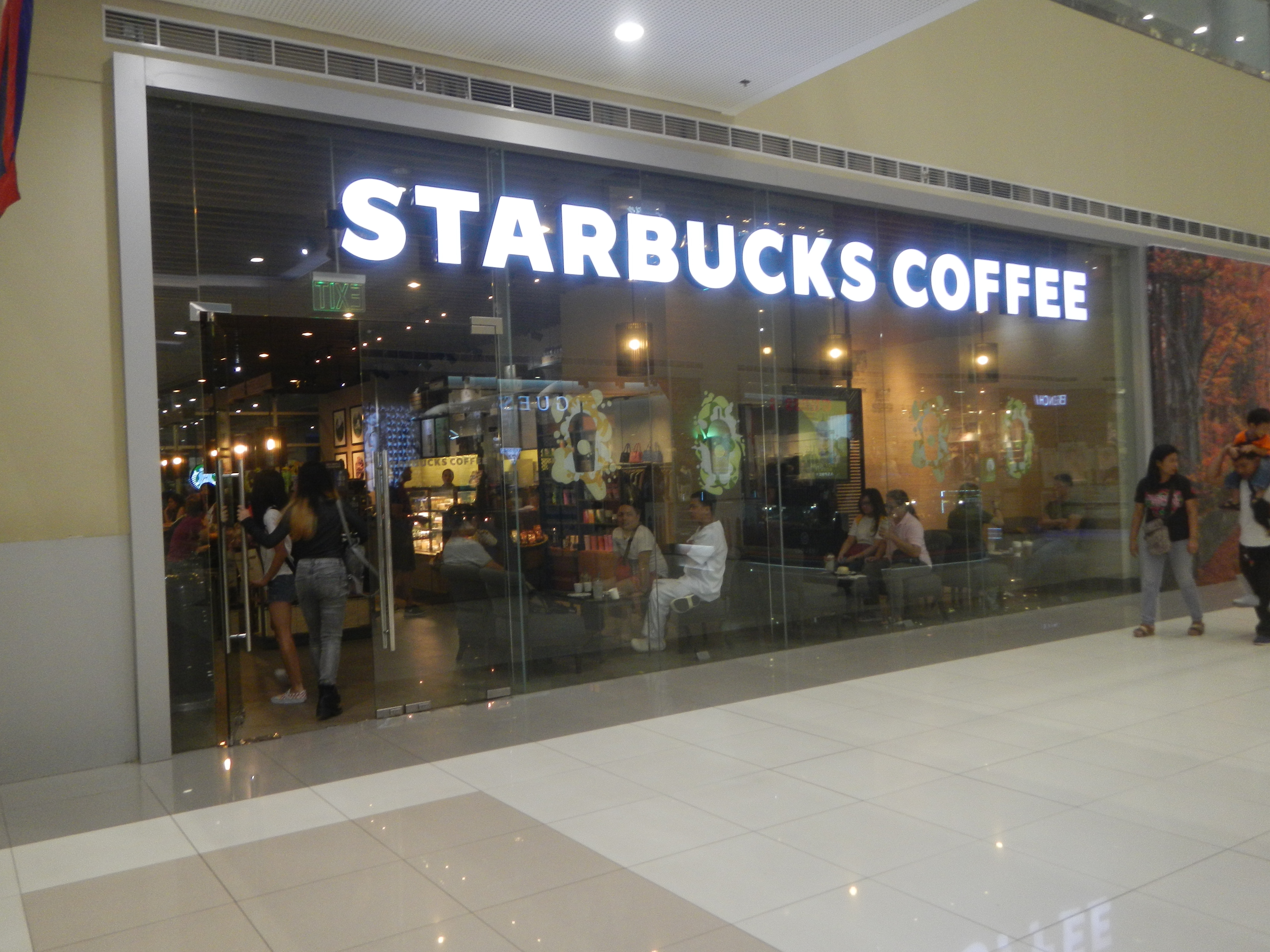
Starbucks Coffee

== See also ==
- SM City Clark
- SM City Pampanga
- SM Supermalls

Preceded by SM City San Mateo	53rd SM Supermall; 2014	Succeeded by SM Cherry Shaw
