= SM Center Angono =

Shopping centre in the Philippines

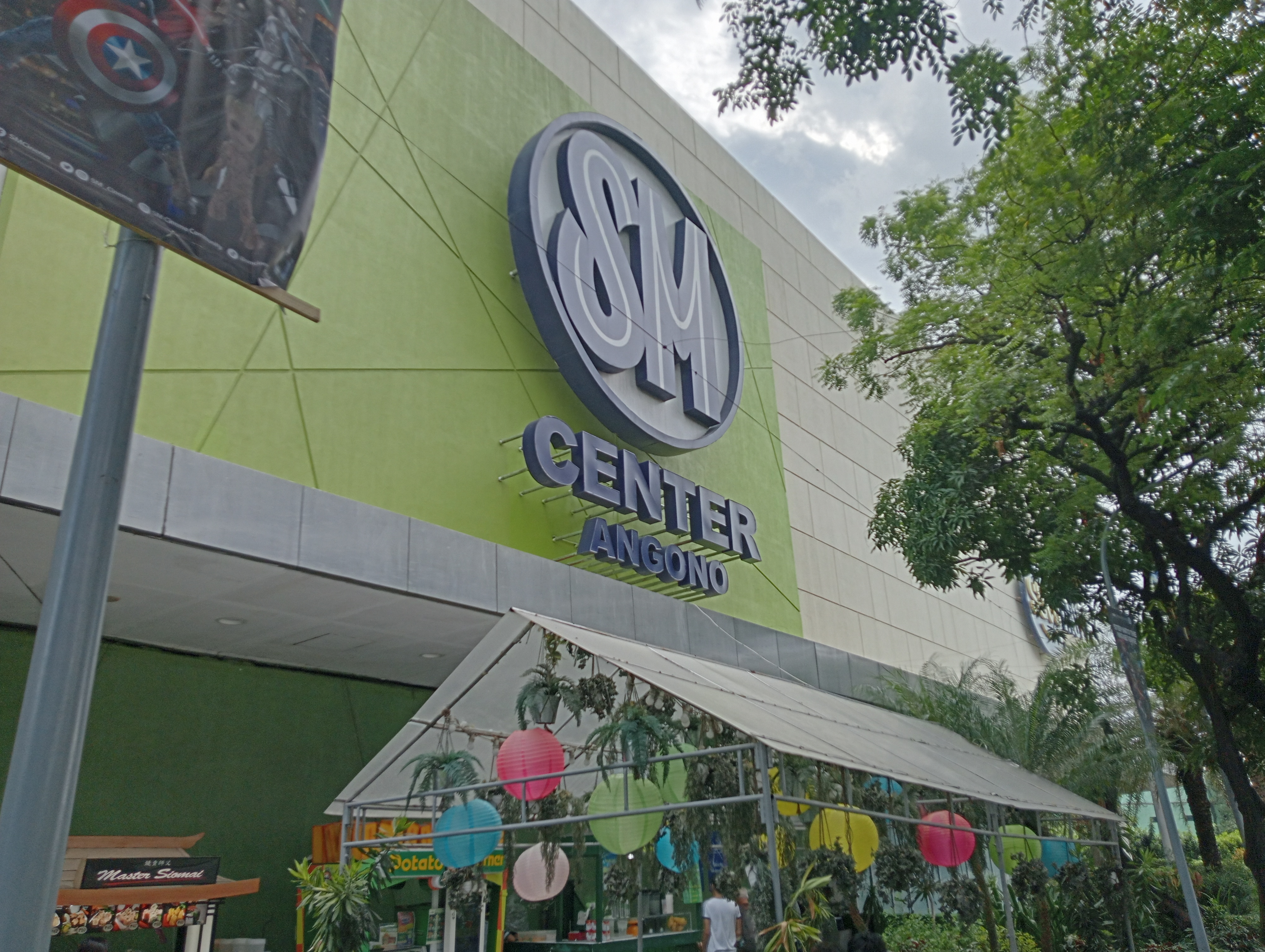
- The facade of SM Center Angono in June 2023
- Location: Manila East Road, San Isidro, Angono, Rizal, Philippines
- Coordinates: 14°31′50″N 121°09′17″E
- Opened: November 14, 2014; 11 years ago
- Developer: SM Prime Holdings
- Manager: SM Prime Holdings
- Owner: Henry Sy, Sr.
- Num. of stores: 140
- Num. of anchor tenants: 17
- Floor area: 41,481 m^{2} (446,500 sq ft)
- Floors: 3
- Parking: 332 cars, 42 motorcycles
- Public transit: 2 SM City Angono
- Website: SM Center Angono

SM Center Angono is a shopping mall owned by SM Prime Holdings, the largest mall developer in the Philippines. It is located along Manila East Road, Angono, Rizal. This mall which opened to the public on 14 November 2014 is the 50th SM Supermall in the Philippines, the second along Manila East Road after SM City Taytay and third in Rizal Province after SM City Taytay and SM City Masinag. It is also the first SM Center to anchor Savemore Market rather than anchoring the Hypermarket. It was succeeded the following year by another SM Supermall also in Rizal, SM City San Mateo.

This three-story mall has floor area of 41,481 square meters (446,500 sq ft) within a land area of 12,650 square meters (136,200 sq ft).

== Planning ==
SM has planned in building its new mall in Angono is in line with the first class urban municipality's vision of becoming Angonopolis in the future. The mall is expected to kick-start this goal of the town's potential role in employment, income and quality of life in it.

Its groundbreaking was held on August 5, 2013 which was expected to hire about 2,000 employees.

== Mall features ==
It has its own rainwater holding tank in which its purpose is to help prevent floods in the community by collecting and holding 1,600 cubic meters (57,000 cu ft) of rainwater. Another of its disaster resilient feature is the expansion joints for mitigating earthquake damage.

Preceded by SM City Cauayan	50th SM Supermall; 2014	Succeeded by SM Megacenter Cabanatuan
