= SM City Cauayan =

- The mall's facade
- Location: Cauayan, Isabela, Philippines
- Coordinates: 16°56′14″N 121°46′10″E
- Address: National Highway cor. Rivera Street, District II
- Opened: May 30, 2014; 12 years ago
- Developer: SM Prime Holdings
- Manager: SM Prime Holdings
- Owner: Henry Sy Sr.
- Floor area: 66,299 m^{2} (713,640 sq ft)
- Floors: 2
- Parking: 570 cars
- Website: SM City Cauayan

SM City Cauayan is a shopping mall owned by SM Prime Holdings. The mall is located along National Highway, District II, Cauayan, Isabela, Philippines. It is the first SM Supermall in the whole Region 2, better known as Cagayan Valley. It is designed by DSGN Associates, EAurelio Landscape Design Inc. and JRP Design Inc.

== Planning ==
Before SM City Cauayan was built, the Cagayan Valley region is one of the few regions on the Philippines without SM Supermall. Isabela, the richest province among the 5 provinces in the region was the prospect of the SM Management as future site of the mall. On November 8, 2012, SM Investments Corp. has set a P65 billion capital expenditures for 2013 for future SM Malls including the SM in Cauayan, the expanded SM Megamall and SM Aura Premier. Construction began in 2012 in the acquired lot of former Isabela Colleges, the mall was set to open in 2013 but it was moved to March 2014 and then again to May 30, 2014, making it the 49th SM Supermall in the Philippines.

== Location ==
Cauayan, Isabela is the Agro-Industrial Capital of Cagayan Valley and the Central Business District of Region II where rice and corn are the main products. Millions of people residing in this region are either directly engaged in farming, food processing, and other agri- businesses yet the number of shopping centers have remained limited and scattered. According to SM Supermall, Cauayan was viewed by SM Malls as an ideal starting point in establishing the company's presence up North-East Luzon as it caters to unserved markets. SM City Cauayan is the first SM Supermall in North-Eastern Luzon, and the third SM City mall in Northern Luzon. First, being SM City Baguio in the Cordilleras, followed by SM City Rosales, in Pangasinan.

== Design and construction ==
Described by SM Supermall as its first Strip mall, SM City Cauayan holds the title as the first non-premier SM Supermall to offer al-fresco malling.

The mall features a landscape that incorporates nature into the design. Ceiling fans are used to ventilate the arcaded walkways and storefront hallways, a green and cost-effective approach compared with the typical use of air conditioners. Its exterior features include warmly colored panels in random pattern combined with glass and steel finishes for a modern touch.

Preceded by SM City BF Parañaque	49th SM Supermall; 2014	Succeeded by SM Center Angono
