= SM City Butuan =

Shopping mall in Butuan and 75th SM Mall in the Philippines

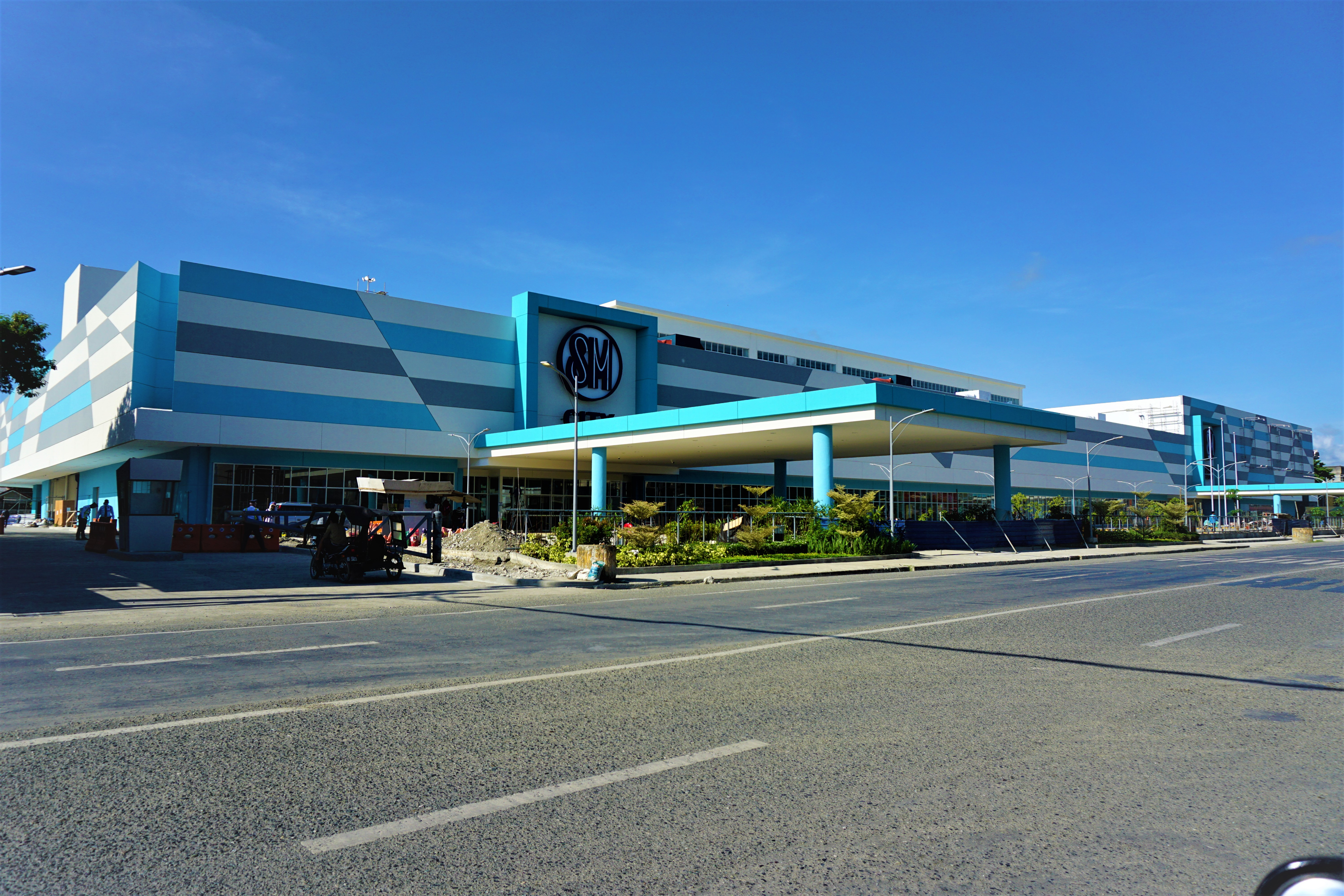
- Location: Butuan, Philippines
- Coordinates: 8°56′44.4″N 125°32′01.6″E
- Address: J.C. Aquino Avenue, Brgy. Lapu-Lapu
- Opened: November 13, 2020; 5 years ago
- Developer: SM Prime Holdings
- Manager: SM Prime Holdings
- Owner: Henry Sy, Sr.
- Architect: Jose Siao Ling and Associates
- Floor area: 59,573 m^{2} (641,240 sq ft)
- Parking: 765 slots
- Website: SM City Butuan

SM City Butuan is a shopping mall owned and operated by SM Prime Holdings, the largest mall owner and operator in the Philippines. It is the first SM Mall in Agusan del Norte and Caraga Region. The mall was supposed to be opened on April 17, 2020, however it was postponed due to the COVID-19 pandemic in the Philippines, and the date of it was moved to November 13, 2020. It is located at J.C. Aquino Avenue, Brgy. Lapu-Lapu, Butuan.

== Facilities ==
SM City Butuan anchor stores are SM Supermarket, SM Store, SM Appliance Center, Ace Hardware, BDO, Surplus, Uniqlo, Miniso, Watsons, Sports Central, SM Cinema, and Cyberzone.

It has a 765 parking slots, including at the roof deck, bicycle lane, a helipad, and a solar panels that support DOE's renewable energy goals.

== Construction ==
SM City Butuan was planned in 2013. Construction was started in 2017, it has a total floor area of 37,000 square meters, and a 3 and a half stories high. The mall was completed in November 2020.

== Gallery ==
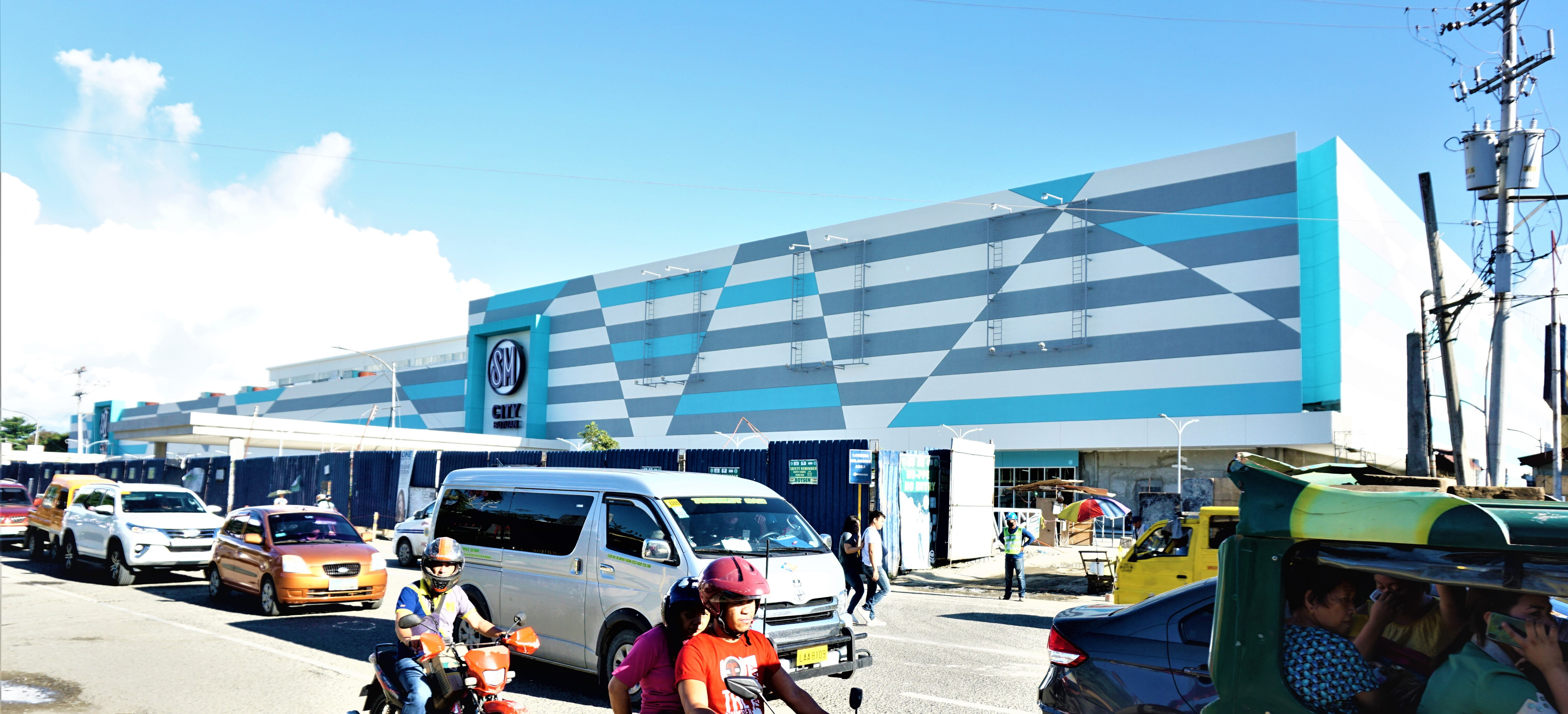
The mall under construction in December 2019

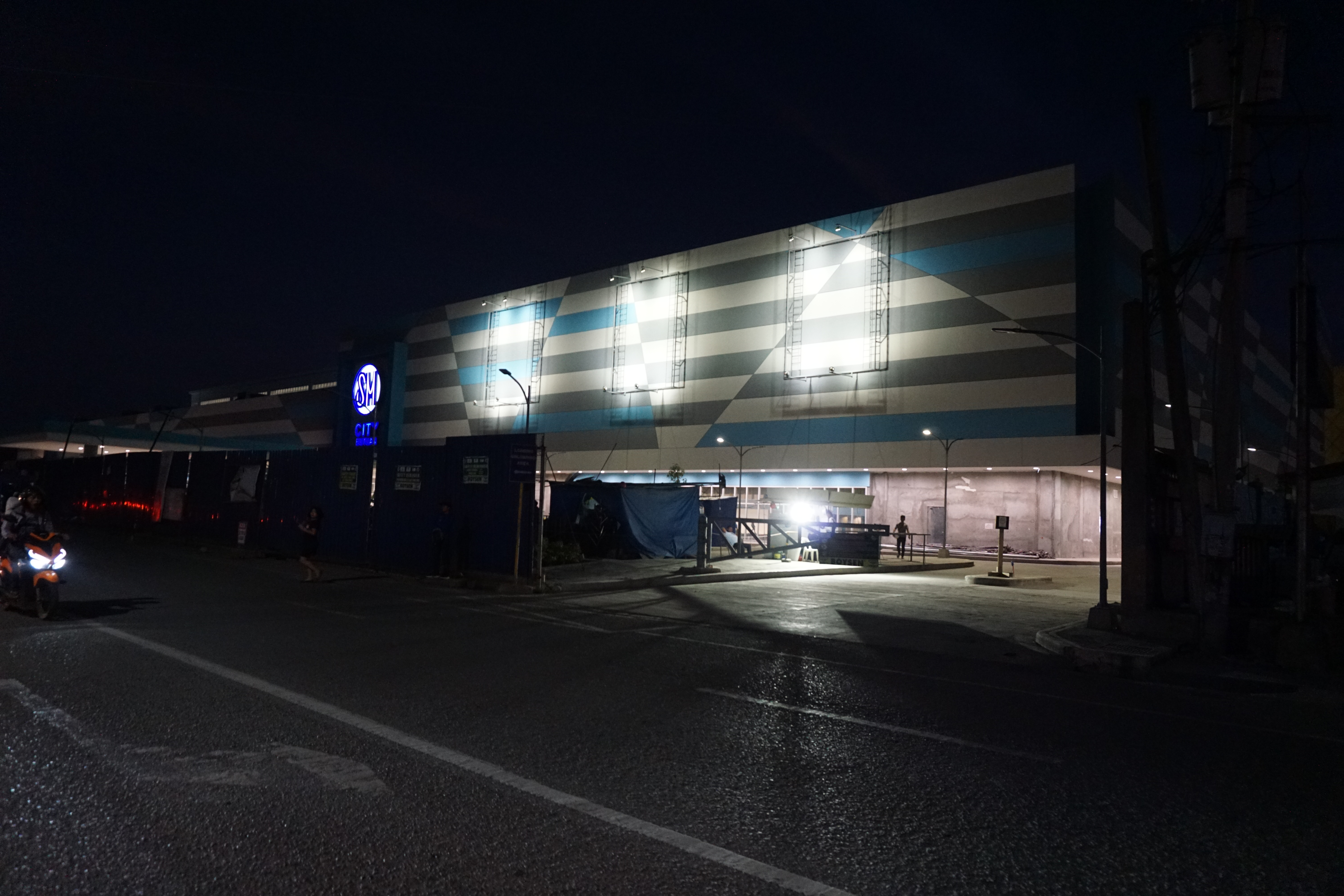
The mall under construction at night in February 2020

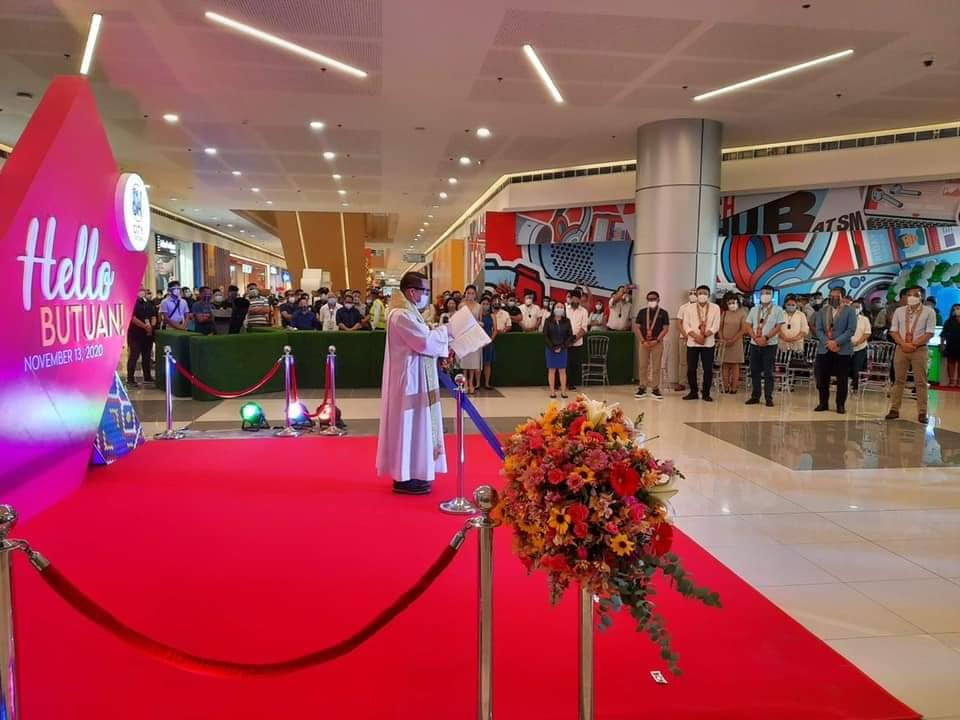
The mall's interior during the blessing on November 2020

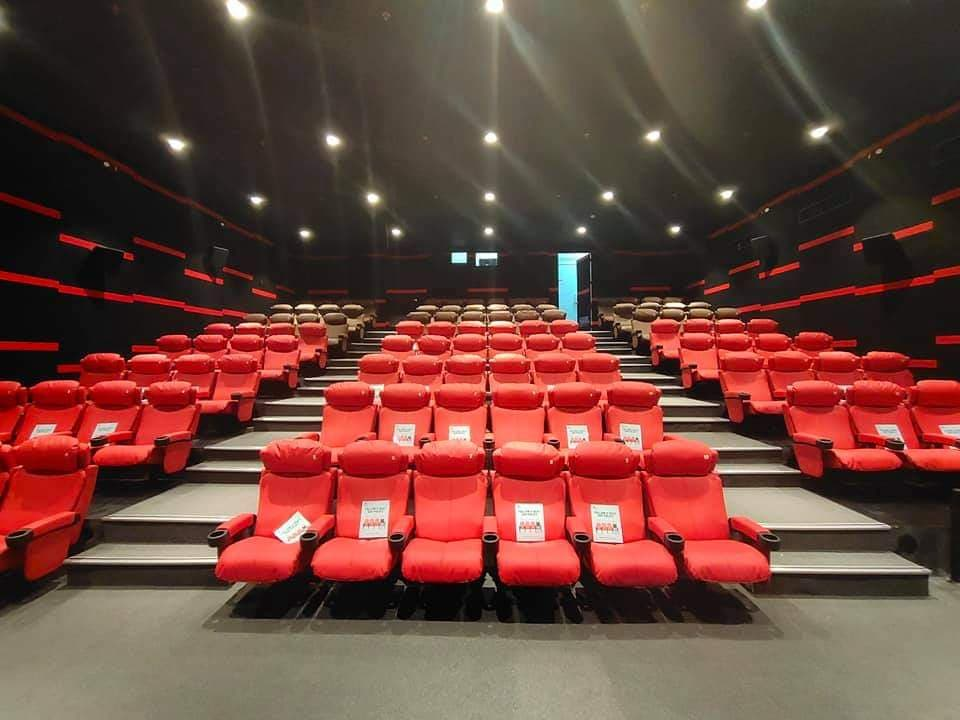
The interior of SM Cinema

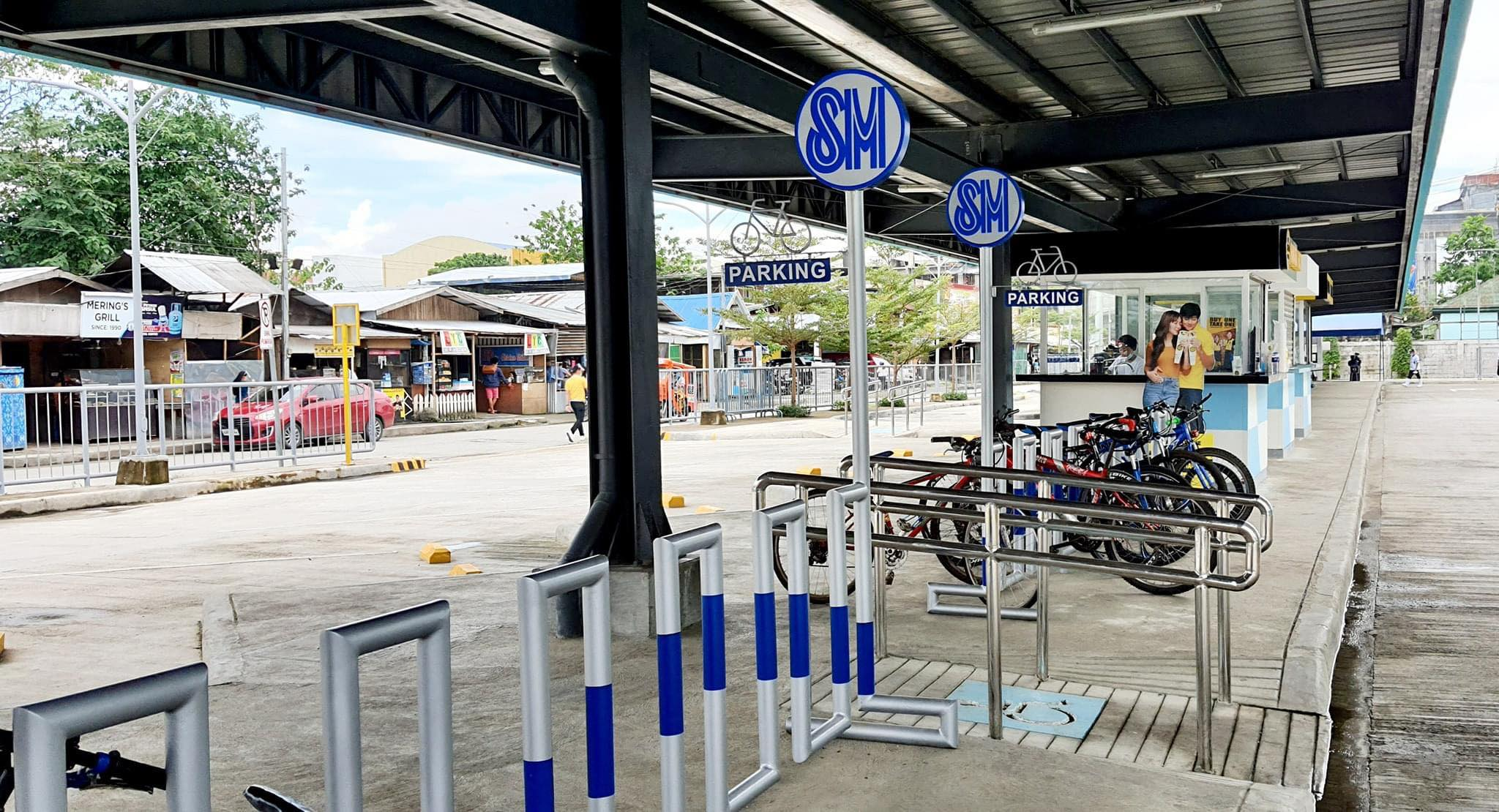
Bicycle lane

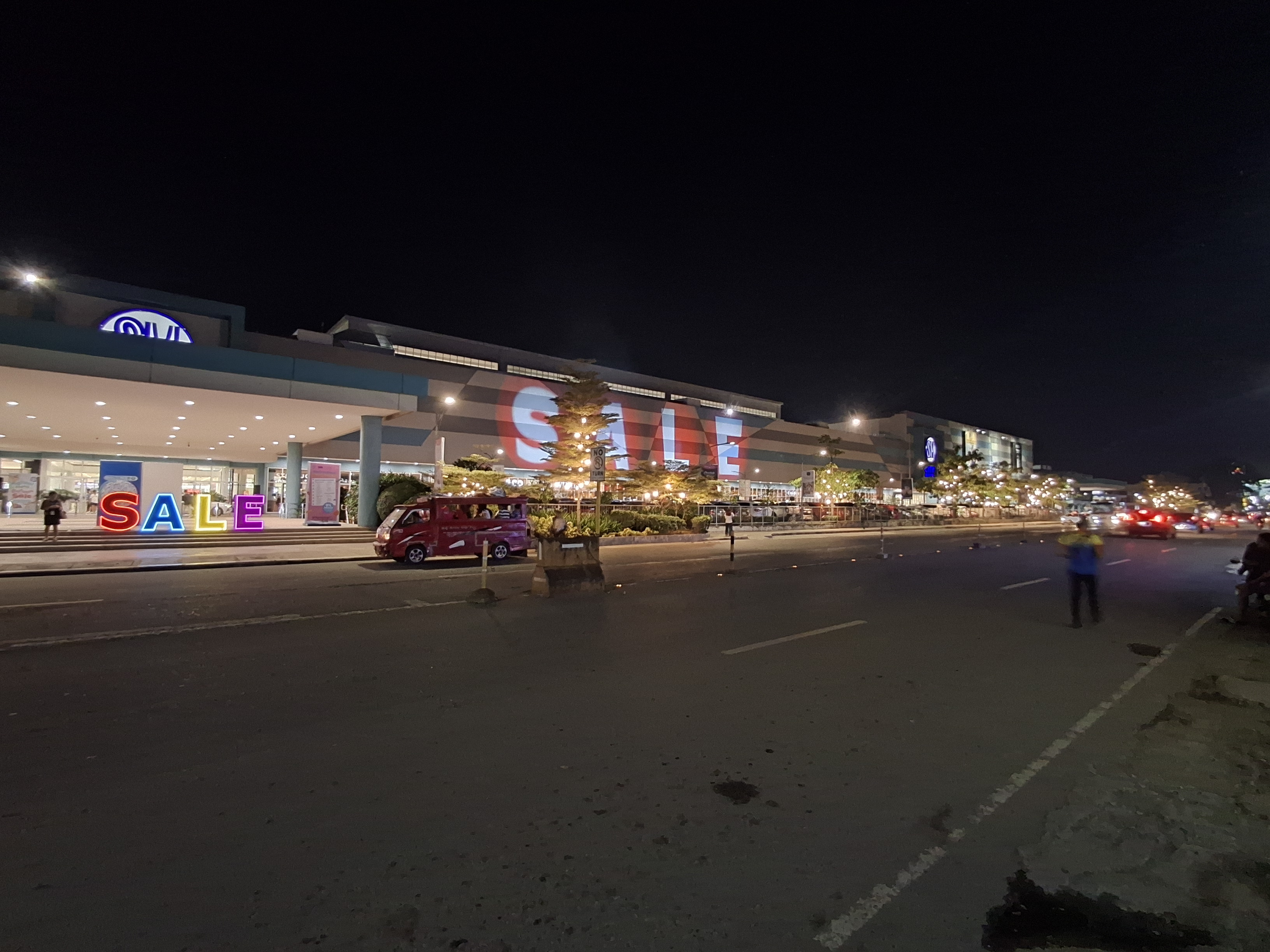
The mall at night in August 2024

== See also ==
- SM Supermalls
- Robinsons Butuan
- List of shopping malls in the Philippines

Preceded by SM Center Dagupan	75th SM Supermall; 2020	Succeeded by SM City Mindpro
