= SM City San Mateo =

Shopping mall in the Philippines

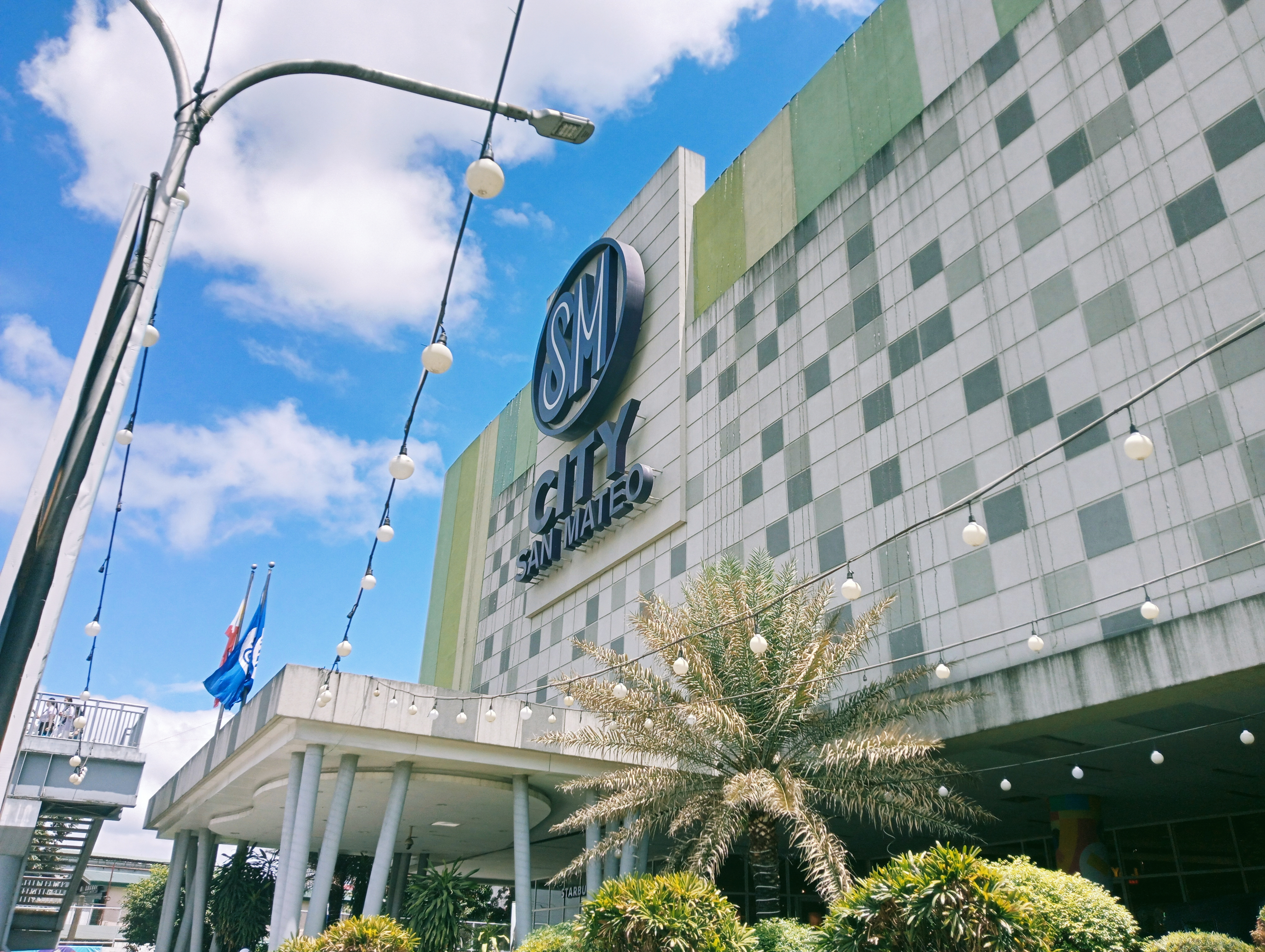
- The facade of SM City San Mateo in 2024
- Location: Gen. Luna Avenue, Brgy. Ampid 1, San Mateo, Rizal, Philippines
- Coordinates: 14°40′47″N 121°06′52″E
- Opened: May 15, 2015; 11 years ago
- Developer: SM Prime Holdings
- Manager: SM Prime Holdings
- Owner: Henry Sy, Sr.
- Num. of stores: 180
- Num. of anchor tenants: 10
- Floor area: 80,043 m^{2} (861,580 sq ft)
- Floors: 3 (Main Mall Area); 6 (Car Park)
- Parking: 430
- Public transit: 34 Ampid
- Website: SM City San Mateo

SM City San Mateo is a shopping mall owned by the largest mall developer in the Philippines, SM Prime Holdings. It is located along Gen. Luna Avenue, Brgy. Ampid 1, San Mateo, Rizal. This first major mall of San Mateo opens on May 15, 2015, being the fourth SM Supermall in Rizal Province after SM City Taytay, SM City Masinag and SM Center Angono, and the 52nd SM Supermall in the country. The mall is designed by JRP Design Inc., a local architectural design firm in Ayala Alabang, Muntinlupa and DSGN associates, a firm based in Dallas, Texas, United States, which also designed SM City Marikina.

The mall has a gross floor area (GFA) of 80,043 m^{2} (861,580 sq ft) situated on 22,882 m^{2} (246,300 sq ft) of land.

== Planning ==
The 2011 SM Investments Corporation's annual report initially gives hints to the upcoming SM Supermall in San Mateo which is one of the fastest growing municipalities in Rizal province. San Mateo is selected by SM Prime Holdings to build an SM City to stay ahead with competition by addressing the continued greater demand of convenience and accessibility of its customers for city neighborhoods and fast growing provincial cities.

== Construction ==
Site clearing began in May 2013 then a public consultation led by SM representatives was conducted in June 2013 for residents of Brgy. Ampid 1. Full blast construction started in December 2013 having DDT Konstract, Inc. as SM City San Mateo's general contractor wherein SM Investments Corporation is one of its clients. SM City San Mateo's topping-off ceremony which marks its structural completion is held on October 10, 2014 while its tenant preview is conducted on February 26, 2015.

== Location ==
SM City San Mateo is located northbound along a two-lane national road, Gen. Luna Avenue, in Brgy. Ampid 1, San Mateo, Rizal, which connects J.P. Rizal Road of Marikina in Metro Manila from the south and Mabini Road of Rodriguez also in Rizal Province to the north. Its location is strategically planned such that the mall serves over 640,000 residents coming from San Mateo and Rodriguez; northern Barangays of Marikina nearest to San Mateo - Brgy. Nangka, Tumana, Malanday, Concepcion Uno, Parang, and Fortune; and among the most populated Barangays in the eastern district of Quezon City - Brgy. Batasan Hills, Payatas, parts of Bagong Silangan, Commonwealth, Holy Spirit, and Matandang Balara, which the latter Barangays have access coming from Commonwealth Avenue and Batasan Road connecting through Batasan-San Mateo Road (direct access of origin for Brgy. Batasan Hills) from west intersecting with Gen. Luna Avenue to the east.

A fraction of the mall site was the former site of a school named Eastern Star Academy which has then transferred to Brgy. Sta. Ana beside ICCT Colleges San Mateo Campus. The mall is near its competitors like Puregold San Mateo and BudgetLane SulitMarket which are both located along Gen. Luna Avenue.

== Mall Features ==
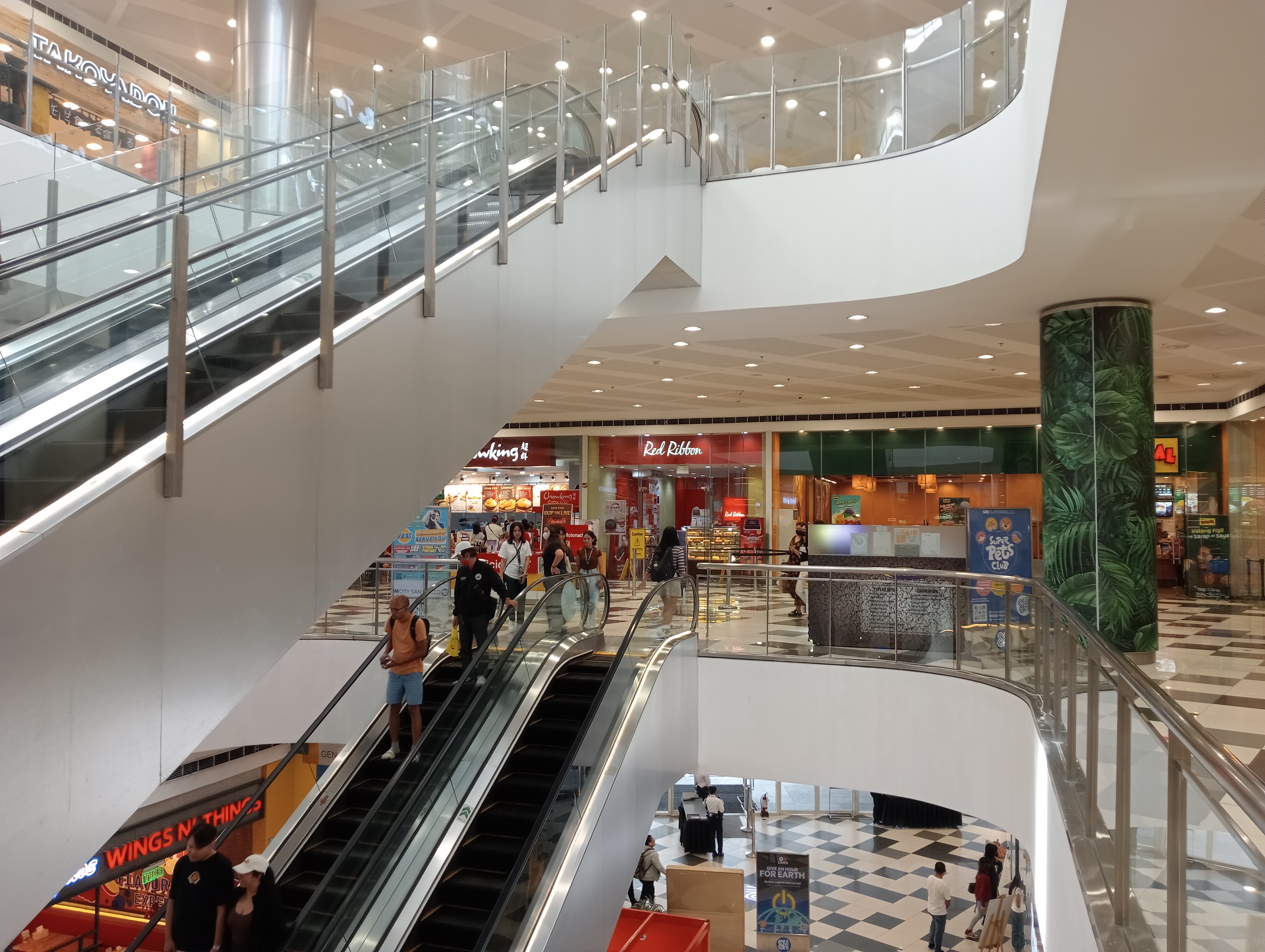
Inside the mall

SM City San Mateo has a total of 4 levels which the first 3 levels are for shopping, dining, entertainment, and services. The last level offers office spaces for Business Process Outsourcing (BPO) sector. It also includes 180 shopping units, 4 digital movie theaters with a total seating capacity of 1,240 and a 6-level car park with a total of 430 parking slots.

The mall has its disaster resilient features which include expansion joints for mitigating earthquake damage and rainwater catchment basin for prevention of flood within its perimeter and surrounding community.

== See also ==
- SM Center Angono
- SM City Marikina

Preceded by SM Megacenter Cabanatuan	52nd SM Supermall; 2015	Succeeded by SM City Cabanatuan
