= SM City Urdaneta Central =

Shopping Mall in Pangasinan, Philippines

- Front facade of the Mall in 2018
- Location: Barangay Nancayasan, Urdaneta City, Pangasinan, Philippines
- Coordinates: 15°58′16″N 120°34′19″E
- Opened: May 4, 2018; 8 years ago
- Developer: SM Prime Holdings
- Manager: SM Prime Holdings
- Num. of stores: 176
- Num. of anchor tenants: 4
- Floor area: 42,000 m^{2} (450,000 sq ft)
- Floors: 4 + 1 basement level
- Website: www.smsupermalls.com/mall-directory/sm-city-urdaneta-central/information

SM City Urdaneta Central, is a shopping mall located at Barangay Nancayasan, Urdaneta City, Pangasinan, Philippines. It is the 68th SM Supermall in the Philippines and the second in Pangasinan developed and operated by SM Prime Holdings. It has a gross floor area of approximately 42,000 square meters (452,084 sq ft).

== History ==
The mall was officially opened to the public on May 4, 2018, and is the second SM Supermall in Pangasinan after SM City Rosales. The initial lineup of anchor tenants included The SM Store, SM Supermarket, SM Appliance Center, and SM Cyberzone, alongside other SM affiliate brands such as Watsons, Ace Hardware, Our Home, Surplus, and Miniso.

Plans for the construction of the mall's third floor had been in place since 2018, but was delayed due to the COVID-19 pandemic. Finally, on May 13, 2022, the mall opened its third-floor expansion. The new floor added space for retail, dining, service outlets, an event center, and a cinema.

== Amenities ==
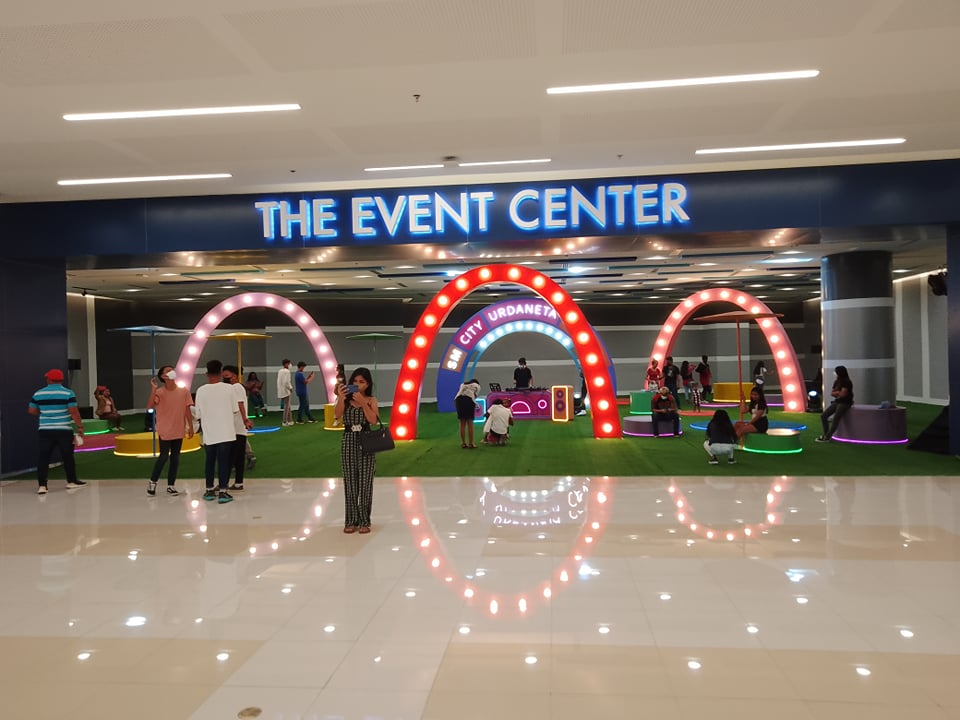
The Event Center

The mall hosts major anchors such as The SM Store and SM Supermarket. The mall contains a cinema complex and a food court located on the third floor, as well as wellness and service outlets such as banks and telecom providers. Government services are also available inside the mall, including a Philippine Statistics Authority branch for civil registry and national ID processing, and a satellite police clearance desk established under an agreement between the Philippine National Police and SM Supermalls to improve access to frontline services.

== Transport and accessibility ==
SM City Urdaneta Central is situated along MacArthur Highway, a primary thoroughfare connecting major towns and cities in Pangasinan. The mall is serviced by various modes of public transportation, including jeepneys, buses, and UV Express vans.
