= SM City Olongapo Central =

- The facade of SM City Olongapo Central in 2023.
- Location: Olongapo, Philippines
- Coordinates: 14°50′10″N 120°16′59″E
- Address: Rizal Avenue, Brgy. East Tapinac
- Opened: September 13, 2019; 7 years ago
- Developer: SM Prime Holdings
- Manager: SM Prime Holdings
- Owner: Henry Sy, Sr.
- Architect: Jose Siao Ling and Associates
- Floor area: 72,940 m^{2} (785,100 sq ft)
- Floors: Main Mall: 4; Car Park: 3
- Parking: 1500 slots
- Website: SM City Olongapo Central

SM City Olongapo Central is a shopping mall owned and operated by SM Prime Holdings, the largest mall owner and operator in the Philippines. It is the second SM Supermall in Zambales and the second SM Supermall in Olongapo after SM City Olongapo Downtown. It is the largest SM Mall in Zambales in terms of floor area, with 72,940 m^{2} (785,100 sq ft).

== Mall complex ==
=== Mall building ===
SM City Olongapo Central anchor stores are SM Supermarket, SM Store, SM Appliance Center, Ace Hardware, BDO, Chinabank, Our Home, Surplus, Uniqlo, Miniso, National Book Store, Watsons, Sports Central, Cyberzone, Wellness Zone and SM Foodcourt. It also features 6 cinemas.

=== Car Park and SMX Convention Center ===
Car Park Building has a three-level parking lot. The building is connected to the main mall.

SMX Convention Center Olongapo offers 5 function rooms and 7 meeting rooms, totaling 2,130 square meters of leasable space that can accommodate anything from an audience of 2,000 to an exclusive conference for 10. It is located at the fourth floor of SM City Olongapo Central commercial complex.

=== Cyberzone and Wellness Zone ===
It consists of David's Salon, Nails.Glow, Browlab, Savouge, and other internationally and nation well-known brand.The Cyberzone Area consists of Samsung, Realme, Huawei, Power Macbook Center, JBL, Asus, Infinix, Audionet, Funmobile, Globe, Smart, PLDT, and other well-known brand stores across the nation and internationally.

== See also ==
- SM City Olongapo Downtown
- Harbor Point
- List of largest shopping malls
- List of shopping malls in Metro Manila
- List of shopping malls in the Philippines

Preceded by SM Center Ormoc	73rd SM Supermall; 2019	Succeeded by SM Center Dagupan
