= SM City Rosales =

- The facade of SM City Rosales in 2018
- Location: MacArthur Highway, Brgy. Carmen East, Rosales, Pangasinan, Philippines
- Coordinates: 15°52′46″N 120°36′09″E
- Opened: Main Mall: November 28, 2008; 17 years ago; Annex: May 15, 2009; 17 years ago
- Developer: SM Prime Holdings
- Manager: SM Prime Holdings
- Owner: Henry Sy, Sr.
- Num. of stores: 200+
- Num. of anchor tenants: 8
- Floor area: 60,898 m^{2} (655,500 sq ft)
- Floors: Bldg. A: 1 Bldg. B: 2
- Parking: 700 slots
- Website: SM City Rosales

SM City Rosales is a shopping mall owned by SM Prime Holdings located along MacArthur Highway in barangay Carmen East, Rosales, Pangasinan. It opened on November 28, 2008, and is the first SM Supermall in the province of Pangasinan and in Ilocos Region. The mall has a land area of 121,685 m^{2} (1,309,810 sq ft) and a total gross floor area of 60,989 m^{2} (656,480 sq ft).

== Typhoon Parma devastation ==
On October 8, 2009, the mall was not spared from Typhoon Pepeng as floodwaters entered the ground level of the mall. Merchandise and fixtures owned by the mall's anchor stores and tenants were swept away by the raging flood caused by torrential rains brought by the typhoon. Around 1,000 people, including a pregnant woman, were stranded inside the mall complex. The mall's rooftop became a drop-off point for the rescue workers that were deployed to bring relief goods to the affected residents in the nearby areas.

Barely two months after being devastated, the shopping mall re-opened to the public on November 27, 2009.

== Transportation ==
The mall contains a Public Transport Terminal, with vans, jeepney, and tricycle service to nearby areas. It also serves as a bus stop for inter-provincial bus lines.

Preceded by SM City Marikina	32nd SM Supermall; 2008	Succeeded by SM City Baliwag
