= List of shopping malls in the Philippines =

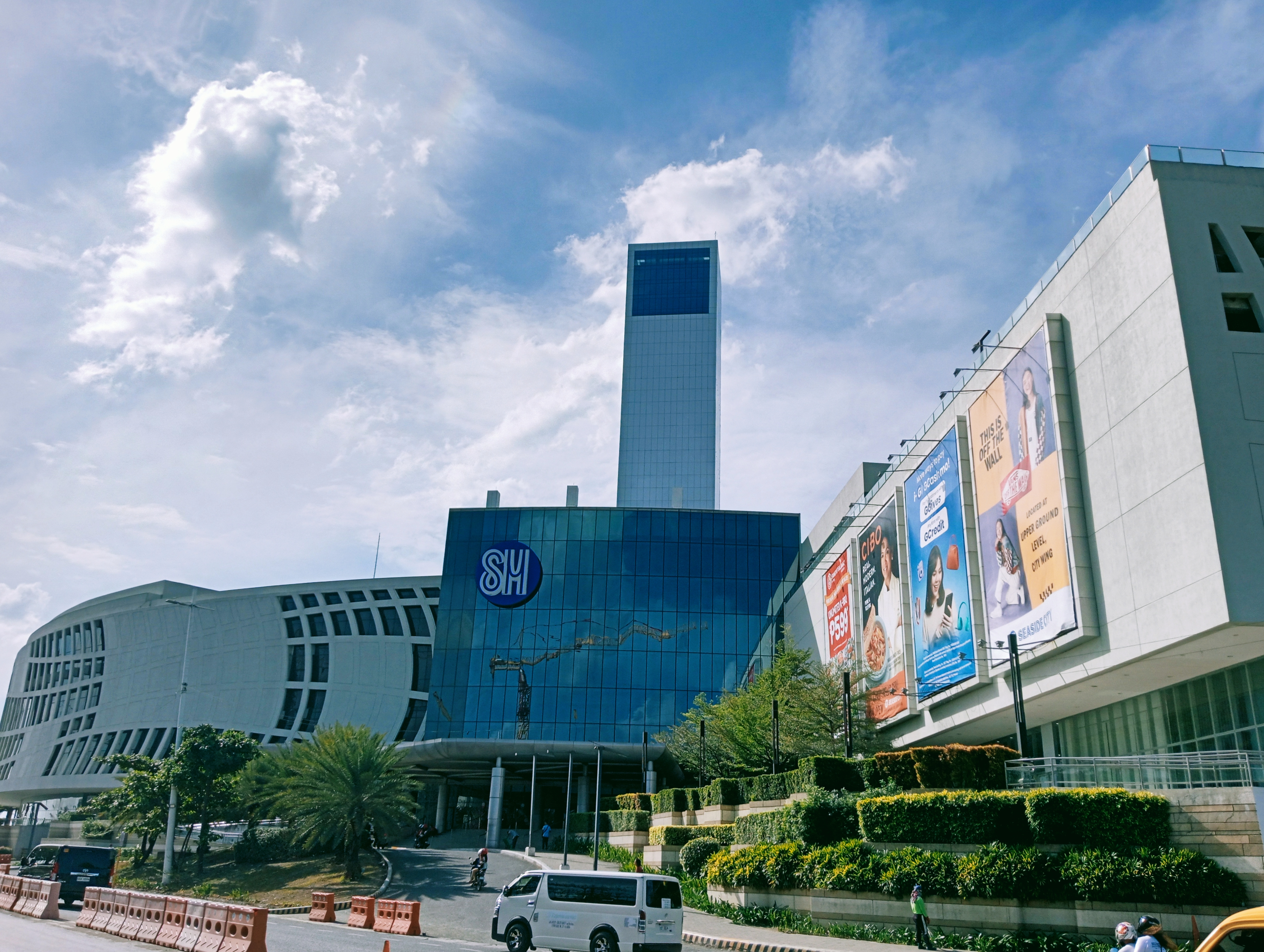
SM Seaside City in Cebu City

Ayala Malls Legazpi in Legazpi, Albay

This is a list of notable shopping malls in the Philippines. The retail industry in the Philippines is an important contributor to the national economy as it accounts for approximately 15% of the country's total Gross National Product (GNP) and 33% of the entire services sector. It employs some 5.25 million people, representing 18% of the country's workforce. The Philippine Retailers Association is the nation's trade group for store owners and mall and shopping center managers. There are over 850 malls in the Philippines.

== Shopping malls by region ==
=== Bangsamoro (BARMM) ===
| Name | City/municipality | Province | Developer | Remarks |
|---|---|---|---|---|
| Mall of Alnor | Cotabato City | Maguindanao del Norte | Alnor Prime Properties | |
| CityMall Cotabato | Cotabato City | Maguindanao del Norte | DoubleDragon Corporation | The biggest CityMall at its opening in terms of GFA (with regards to Grand CityMalls) and the first national retail mall in Cotabato City. |
| South Seas Mall | Cotabato City | Maguindanao del Norte | Store Zone Corporation | |
| Puregold and Centro Shopping Center | Cotabato City | Maguindanao del Norte | Lucio and Susan Co | Puregold has 2 branches in Cotabato City in along Sinsuat Avenue and the other one is along Quezon Avenue |
| Superama Hypermart | Cotabato City | Maguindanao del Norte | Tan Abing | Home grown hypermart in Cotabato City, currently has 5 branches in Cotabato City |
| Fiesta Mall | Cotabato City | Maguindanao del Norte | Unknown businessman from Manila | Known for its Chinese products and second branch of Puregold in Cotabato City |
| KCC Mall of Cotabato | Cotabato City | Maguindanao del Norte | KCC Property Holdings Inc. | KCC Mall of Cotabato is the largest KCC Mall, with a gross floor area (GFA) of 210,000 m^{2}. It is a six-floor mall building, with three-storey annex warehouse building. It is soon to have a 11 storey hotel and a convention center. |

=== Bicol Region ===
| Name | City/municipality | Province | Developer |
|---|---|---|---|
| 101 Shopping Mall | Legazpi | Albay | |
| A. Bichara Silverscreen Entertainment Center | Legazpi | Albay | ABSEC |
| ALDP Mall | Naga | Camarines Sur | |
| Ayala Malls Legazpi | Legazpi | Albay | Ayala Land |
| Bichara Mall Naga | Naga | Camarines Sur | |
| Central Plaza Mall | Daet | Camarines Norte | |
| CityMall Sorsogon | Sorsogon City | Sorsogon | DoubleDragon Corporation |
| Nagaland E-Mall | Naga | Camarines Sur | Nagaland Development Corporation and Robinsons Land |
| Embarcadero de Legazpi | Legazpi | Albay | Sunwest |
| Gaisano Capital Masbate | Masbate City | Masbate | |
| Gaisano Capital Iriga | Iriga | Camarines Sur | |
| Gaisano Capital Sorsogon | Sorsogon City | Sorsogon | |
| Grand Master Mall | Naga | Camarines Sur | Master Square Enterprises |
| Gregorian Mall | Legazpi | Albay | |
| LCC Mall Goa | Goa | Camarines Sur | |
| 101 Shopping center Goa | Goa | Camarines Sur | |
| 101 Shopping center Pili | Pili | Camarines Sur | |
| Angena Trading Calabanga | Calabanga | Camarines Sur | |
| LCC Mall Calabanga | Calabanga | Camarines Sur | |
| Star Master Plaza Calabanga | Calabanga | Camarines Sur | |
| LCC Mall Daraga | Daraga | Albay | |
| LCC Center Guinobatan | Guinobatan | Albay | |
| LCC Mall Ligao | Ligao | Albay | |
| LCC Mall Polangui | Polangui | Albay | |
| XentroMall Polangui | Polangui | Albay | |
| LCC Mall Sorsogon | Sorsogon City | Sorsogon | |
| LCC Mall Tabaco | Tabaco | Albay | |
| LCC Central Mall Naga | Naga | Camarines Sur | Liberty Commercial Center Inc. |
| LCC Mall Iriga | Iriga | Camarines Sur | |
| LCC Mall Legazpi | Legazpi | Albay | |
| LCC Mall Nabua | Nabua | Camarines Sur | |
| Angena Trading Nabua | Nabua | Camarines Sur | |
| Pacific Mall Legazpi | Legazpi | Albay | Landco Development Corp. |
| Primark Town Center Sorsogon | Sorsogon City | Sorsogon | |
| Robinsons Naga | Naga | Camarines Sur | Robinsons Land |
| SM City Daet | Daet | Camarines Norte | SM Prime Holdings |
| SM City Legazpi | Legazpi | Albay | SM Prime Holdings |
| SM City Naga | Naga | Camarines Sur | SM Prime Holdings |
| SM City Sorsogon | Sorsogon City | Sorsogon | SM Prime Holdings |
| Vista Mall Naga | Naga | Camarines Sur | Vista Land & Lifescapes |
| Tabaco City Mall | Tabaco | Albay | |
| Virac Town Center | Virac | Catanduanes | VTC Development Corp. |
| Xentro Mall Malilipot | Malilipot | Albay | |
| Xentro Mall Polangui | Polangui | Albay | |
| Xentro Mall Sorsogon | Sorsogon City | Sorsogon | |
| Yashano Mall | Legazpi | Albay | |
| Yashano Mall | Naga City | Camarines Sur | |
| Youth Center Mall | Virac | Catanduanes | |

=== Cagayan Valley ===
| Name | City/municipality | Province | Developer | Remarks |
|---|---|---|---|---|
| Mall of the Valley | Tuguegarao | Cagayan | | Managed by Xentro Mall |
| Fragante Citimall | Tuguegarao | Cagayan | | First shopping mall in North Luzon |
| Valley Hotel Tower Mall | Tuguegarao | Cagayan | | Completion 2018 |
| Unitop Mall Tuguegarao | Tuguegarao | Cagayan | RI-RANCE Realty Corp. | First Unitop Mall in Cagayan Valley |
| Novo Mall | Aparri | Cagayan | Royal Novo Greenland Realty Corp. | |
| Ryan Mall | Aparri | Cagayan | | |
| Ilagan City Mall | Ilagan | Isabela | | The First LGU-built shopping mall in Ilagan. Savemore is one of the anchor tenants. |
| Northstar Mall | Ilagan | Isabela | Northstar Resources Inc. | First mall in Ilagan. Savemore is one of the anchor tenants. |
| Primark Town Center Tuguegarao | Tuguegarao | Cagayan | Primark Philippine Properties | Former Paseo Reale Mall |
| Primark Town Center Cauayan | Cauayan | Isabela | Primark Philippine Properties | Market Mall |
| Primark Town Center Echague | Echague | Isabela | Primark Philippine Properties | Market Mall, first Primark Town Center in the Philippines |
| Primark Town Center Bambang | Bambang | Nueva Vizcaya | Primark Philippine Properties | Market Mall |
| Primark Town Center Cordon | Cordon | Isabela | Primark Philippine Properties | Market Mall |
| Robinsons Santiago | Santiago | Isabela | Robinsons Land | First Robinsons Mall and first full-service mall in Cagayan Valley. |
| Robinsons Tuguegarao | Tuguegarao | Cagayan | Robinsons Land | Second Robinsons Mall in Cagayan Valley and First Robinsons Mall in Cagayan |
| Vista Mall Santiago | Santiago | Isabela | Vista Land & Lifescapes | Under construction, First Vista Mall in Cagayan Valley Region |
| SM City Tuguegarao | Tuguegarao | Cagayan | SM Prime Holdings | Opened November 18, 2022, Second SM Mall in Tuguegarao City |
| SM Center Tuguegarao Downtown | Tuguegarao | Cagayan | SM Prime Holdings | Second SM Mall in Cagayan Valley and First SM Mall in Cagayan |
| SM City Cauayan | Cauayan | Isabela | SM Prime Holdings | First SM Mall in Cagayan Valley. Former site of Isabela Colleges Foundation. First SM Mall with full solar panels. |
| Talavera Square Mall | Cauayan | Isabela | | First mall in Cauayan. Unitop is one of the anchor tenants. |
| Talavera Square Mall | Ilagan | Isabela | | Robinsons Supermarket is one of the anchor tenants. |
| Xentro Mall Cabagan | Cabagan | Isabela | AMRC Holdings Co. Inc. | |
| Northstar Mall Ilagan | Ilagan | Isabela | AMRC Holdings Co. Inc. | |
| Xentro Mall Roxas | Roxas | Isabela | AMRC Holdings Co. Inc. | |
| Xentro Mall Santiago | Santiago | Isabela | AMRC Holdings Co. Inc. | First Xentro Mall in Cagayan Valley and in the Philippines |
| Xentro Mall Tumauini | Tumauini | Isabela | AMRC Holdings Co. Inc. | |
| CityMall Tuguegarao | Tuguegarao | Cagayan | DoubleDragon Corporation, SM Investments Corporation | Under construction, First CityMall in Cagayan Valley |
| CityMall Aparri | Aparri | Cagayan | DoubleDragon Corporation, SM Investments Corporation | Under construction, Second CityMall in Cagayan Valley |
| MartOne Mall Santiago | Santiago | Isabela | | First MartOne Mall in Cagayan Valley Region |
| HappyGo lucky Mall Santiago | Santiago | Isabela | | First Divisoria type mall in Cagayan Valley Region |
| Unisun Shopping Mall Santiago | Santiago | Isabela | | Divisoria type mall in Cagayan Valley Region |

=== Calabarzon ===
==== Major shopping centers ====
Regional major shopping centers each have over a hundred local and international stores and are anchored by at least one department store and supermarket or hypermarket. They are also the largest malls (at least 100,000 square meters) in the region which feature not just stores but also attractions: movie theaters, rides, skating rinks, bowling alleys, and other recreational facilities. Each provides thousands of automobile parking spaces and is located mostly near rail stations and established business districts within the metropolis.

| Name | City/municipality | Province | Developer | Floor area (m^{2}) | Remarks | Image |
|---|---|---|---|---|---|---|
| Sta. Lucia Mall | Cainta | Rizal | Sta. Lucia Realty & Development Inc. | 230,000 | Largest mall in South Luzon | |
| SM City Bacoor | Bacoor | Cavite | SM Prime Holdings | 120,202 | First SM Mall in Cavite | |
| SM City Dasmariñas | Dasmariñas | Cavite | SM Prime Holdings | 198,000 | Largest shopping mall in Cavite Province Second SM Mall in Cavite and Second SM Mall in South Luzon | |
| SM City Lipa | Lipa | Batangas | SM Prime Holdings | 141,283 | Second SM Mall in Batangas and largest mall in Batangas | |
| SM City Santa Rosa | Santa Rosa | Laguna | SM Prime Holdings | 137,463 | First SM Mall in Laguna, and largest mall in the province | |

==== Outlet malls ====
Outlet malls or strip malls consist mainly of food outlets and several stores and businesses sharing one parking lot. These casual dining and retail centers have become popular hangouts among young professionals.

| Name | City/municipality | Province | Developer | Remarks |
|---|---|---|---|---|
| Acienda Designer Outlet | Silang | Cavite | Cathay Land Inc. | |
| The Outlets at Lipa | Lipa | Batangas | Aboitiz Land | |
| Paseo Outlets | Sta. Rosa City | Laguna | Greenfields Development Corporations | |

==== Community malls ====
Community or regional shopping centers are built around one department store or supermarket and are enclosed. These shopping centers are located mostly in suburban residential areas of the metropolis and typically cater to the basic shopping needs of area residents.

| Name | City/municipality | Province | Developer | Remarks |
|---|---|---|---|---|
| Arcadia Mall | Sta. Rosa | Laguna | Greenfields Development Corporations | A Retail Mall |
| Bay City Mall | Batangas City | Batangas | | Anchored by Citimart Department Store & Supermarket |
| Central Mall Binangonan | Binangonan | Rizal | Premiumlink Development Corp. | Anchored by SM Savemore Market |
| Central Mall Biñan | Biñan | Laguna | Premiumlink Development Corp. | Anchored by SM Savemore Market |
| Central Mall Dasmariñas | Dasmariñas | Cavite | Premiumlink Development Corp. | Anchored by SM Savemore Market |
| Centro Mall Cabuyao | Cabuyao | Laguna | New APEC Development Corp. | Anchored by Robinsons Supermarket |
| Checkpoint Mall | Calamba | Laguna | MARESCO | Anchored by Super Metro Hypermarket |
| CityMall Anabu | Imus | Cavite | DoubleDragon Corporation | Anchored by SM Savemore |
| CityMall Calamba | Calamba | Laguna | DoubleDragon Corporation | Anchored by MerryMart |
| CityMall Tiaong | Tiaong | Quezon | DoubleDragon Corporation | Anchored by SM Savemore Market |
| CLA Town Center | Pagsanjan | Laguna | | Anchored by Puregold |
| Fiesta World Mall | Lipa | Batangas | | Anchored by Puregold |
| FRC Supermall | Imus | Cavite | | Anchored by Puregold |
| Gaisano Capital Binangonan | Binangonan | Rizal | | Anchored by Walter Mart Supermarket |
| iMall Antipolo | Antipolo | Rizal | | Anchored by SM Savemore Market |
| iMall Canlubang | Calamba | Laguna | | Anchored by Robinsons Supermarket |
| iMall Famy | Famy | Laguna | | |
| Laguna Central | Sta. Rosa | Laguna | Greenfields Development Corporations | Lifestyle Mall Anchored by Shopwise |
| LCC Mall Lopez | Lopez | Quezon | Liberty Commercial Center, Inc. | |
| Lokal Mall | Kawit | Cavite | | Anchored by Walter Mart Supermarket |
| Los Baños Centro: Lifestyle & Convention Center | Los Baños | Laguna | | Anchored by SM Savemore Market |
| Lotus Mall | Imus | Cavite | Lotus Central Mall, Inc. | Anchored by Walter Mart Supermarket |
| Lumina Point Mall | Imus | Cavite | Lotus Central Mall, Inc. | Anchored by SM Savemore Market |
| Main Square Mall | Bacoor | Cavite | Filinvest Land | Anchored by Robinsons Supermarket |
| Metro Central Mall | Santa Cruz | Laguna | | Anchored by Robinsons Supermarket & Metro Shoppers Department Store |
| Midtown Square | Silang | Cavite | Fertilis Realty Corp. | Anchored by Newstar Department Store & Supermarket |
| Montalban Town Center | Rodriguez | Rizal | | Anchored by Robinsons Supermarket |
| Morong Centerpoint | Morong | Rizal | | |
| Nuciti Central Mall | Batangas City | Batangas | | Anchored by Robinsons Supermarket |
| Olivarez Plaza Los Baños | Los Baños | Laguna | | Anchored by W Department Store & Walter Mart Supermarket |
| Pacific Mall Lucena | Lucena | Quezon | Landco Pacific and Vicsal Corporation | |
| Pavilion Mall | Biñan | Laguna | Ayala Land (operator) | Anchored by Puregold |
| Portal Mall | Gen. Mariano Alvarez | Cavite | Lotus Central Mall, Inc. | Anchored by SM Savemore Market |
| Premier Plaza | Silang | Cavite | | Anchored by Robinsons Supermarket |
| Primark Town Center Cainta | Cainta | Rizal | Primark Philippine Properties | Anchored by SM Savemore Market |
| Primark Town Center Noveleta | Noveleta | Cavite | Primark Philippine Properties | Anchored by SM Savemore Market |
| Primark Town Center Rosario | Rosario | Cavite | Primark Philippine Properties | Anchored by SM Savemore Market |
| Primark Town Center Silang | Silang | Cavite | Primark Philippine Properties | Anchored by SM Savemore Market |
| Primark Town Center Santa Cruz | Santa Cruz | laguna | Primark Philippine Properties | Anchored by SM Savemore Market |
| Primark Town Center Tagatay | Tagaytay | Cavite | Primark Philippine Properties | Anchored by SM Hypermarket |
| Primark Town Center Tayabas | Tayabas | Quezon | Primark Philippine Properties | Anchored by SM Savemore Market |
| RFC Molino | Bacoor | Cavite | | Anchored by Emilus Mart |
| Robinsons Dasmariñas | Dasmariñas | Cavite | Robinsons Land | Second Robinsons mall in Cavite |
| Robinsons GenTrias | General Trias | Cavite | Robinsons Land | |
| Robinsons Imus | Imus | Cavite | Robinsons Land | |
| Robinsons Lipa | Lipa | Batangas | Robinsons Land | |
| Robinsons Cainta | Cainta | Rizal | Robinsons Land | |
| Robinsons Sta. Rosa | Santa Rosa | Laguna | Robinsons Land | formerly called Robinsons Place Sta. Rosa and Robinsons Sta. Rosa Market, where the Robinsons Department Store at the second floor was closed and occupied by the Teletech BPO |
| Robinsons Los Baños | Los Baños | Laguna | Robinsons Land | |
| Robinsons Townville Buhay na Tubig | Imus | Cavite | Robinsons Land | |
| SM Center Angono | Angono | Rizal | SM Prime Holdings | Third SM Mall in Rizal |
| SM Center Antipolo Downtown | Antipolo | Rizal | SM Prime Holdings | Fifth SM Mall in Rizal and formerly Cherry Foodarama Antipolo before it was acquired by SM. |
| SM Center Imus | Imus | Cavite | SM Prime Holdings | Sixth SM Mall in Cavite |
| SM Center Lemery | Lemery | Batangas | SM Prime Holdings | Third SM mall in Batangas |
| SM Center San Pedro | San Pedro | Laguna | SM Prime Holdings | Fourth SM mall in Laguna; Anchored by the first SM Hypermarket in the province |
| SM City Batangas | Batangas City | Batangas | SM Prime Holdings | First SM Mall in Batangas |
| SM City Calamba | Calamba | Laguna | SM Prime Holdings | Third SM Mall in Laguna |
| SM City Lucena | Lucena | Quezon | SM Prime Holdings | First SM Mall in Quezon and Largest Mall in Quezon Province |
| SM City Masinag | Antipolo | Rizal | SM Prime Holdings | Second SM Mall in Rizal |
| SM City Molino | Bacoor | Cavite | SM Prime Holdings | Third SM Mall in Cavite and Second SM Mall in Bacoor; Formerly called SM Supercenter Molino/SM Center Molino with the opening of The SM Store Molino in 2015 |
| SM City Rosario | Rosario | Cavite | SM Prime Holdings | Fourth SM Mall in Cavite |
| SM City San Mateo | San Mateo | Rizal | SM Prime Holdings | Fourth SM Mall in Rizal |
| SM City San Pablo | San Pablo | Laguna | SM Prime Holdings | Second SM Mall in Laguna |
| SM City Sto. Tomas | Sto. Tomas | Batangas | SM Prime Holdings | Fourth SM mall in Batangas; Singapore-styled mall |
| SM City Tanza | Tanza | Cavite | SM Prime Holdings | Seventh SM Mall in Cavite |
| SM City Taytay | Taytay | Rizal | SM Prime Holdings | First SM Mall in Rizal |
| SM City Trece Martires | Trece Martires | Cavite | SM Prime Holdings | Fifth SM Mall in Cavite |
| Sun Star Plaza | Santa Cruz | Laguna | | Anchored by Centro Department Store & Walter Mart Supermarket |
| Tanay Town Center | Tanay | Rizal | | |
| Target Mall | Sta. Rosa City | Laguna | | Anchored by Robinsons Supermarket |
| The District Dasmariñas | Dasmariñas | Cavite | Ayala Land | |
| The District Imus | Imus | Cavite | Ayala Land | First Ayala Mall in Cavite |
| The Stadium Shopping Strip | Naic | Cavite | | Anchored by SM Hypermarket |
| Unitop Mall Dasmariñas | Dasmariñas | Cavite | | Anchored by SM Savemore Market |
| Umbria Commercial Center | Biñan | Laguna | | Anchored by Robinsons Supermarket |
| V Central Mall General Trias | General Trias | Cavite | | Anchored by DiviMart & Puregold |
| V Central Mall Molino | Bacoor | Cavite | | Anchored by Puregold & M Department Store |
| Victory Central Mall Sta. Rosa | Santa Rosa | Laguna | | Anchored by 167 Shopping Center & Puregold |
| Victory Mall and Market Tanauan | Tanauan City | Batangas | | Anchored by SM Savemore Market |
| Vista Mall Antipolo | Antipolo | Rizal | Vista Land & Lifescapes | |
| Vista Mall Dasmariñas | Dasmariñas | Cavite | Vista Land & Lifescapes | |
| Vista Mall General Trias | General Trias | Cavite | Vista Land & Lifescapes | |
| Vista Mall Imus | Imus | Cavite | Vista Land & Lifescapes | |
| Vista Mall Kawit | Kawit | Cavite | Vista Land & Lifescapes | |
| Vista Mall Silang | Silang | Cavite | Vista Land & Lifescapes | Phase 1 Completed |
| Vista Mall Sta. Rosa | Santa Rosa | Laguna | Vista Land & Lifescapes | |
| Vista Mall Tanza | Tanza | Cavite | Vista Land & Lifescapes | |
| SOMO - A Vista Mall | Bacoor | Cavite | Vista Land & Lifescapes | Former Vista Mall Daang Hari |
| Walter Mart Antipolo | Antipolo | Rizal | WM Property Management Inc. and SM Investment Corp. | |
| Walter Mart Bacoor | Bacoor | Cavite | WM Property Management Inc. and SM Investment Corp. | |
| Walter Mart Balayan | Batangas | Batangas | WM Property Management Inc. and SM Investment Corp. | |
| Walter Mart Batangas City | Batangas City | Batangas | WM Property Management Inc. and SM Investment Corp. | |
| Walter Mart Cabuyao | Cabuyao | Laguna | WM Property Management Inc. and SM Investment Corp. | |
| Walter Mart Candelaria | Candelaria | Quezon | WM Property Management Inc. and SM Investment Corp. | |
| Walter Mart Carmona | Carmona | Cavite | WM Property Management Inc. and SM Investment Corp. | |
| Walter Mart Dasmariñas | Dasmariñas | Cavite | WM Property Management Inc. and SM Investment Corp. | |
| Walter Mart General Trias | General Trias | Cavite | WM Property Management Inc. and SM Investment Corp. | |
| Walter Mart Makiling | Calamba | Laguna | WM Property Management Inc. and SM Investment Corp. | |
| Walter Mart Naic | Naic | Cavite | WM Property Management Inc. and SM Investment Corp. | |
| Walter Mart Nasugbu | Nasugbu | Batangas | WM Property Management Inc. and SM Investment Corp. | |
| Walter Mart Silang | Silang | Cavite | WM Property Management Inc. and SM Investment Corp. | |
| Walter Mart Sta. Rosa (Balibago) | Santa Rosa | Laguna | WM Property Management Inc. and SM Investment Corp. | |
| Walter Mart Sta. Rosa Bel-Air | Santa Rosa | Laguna | WM Property Management Inc. and SM Investment Corp. | Second Walter Mart Mall in Sta. Rosa, Laguna |
| Walter Mart Tanauan | Tanauan | Batangas | WM Property Management Inc. and SM Investment Corp. | |
| Walter Mart Taytay | Taytay | Rizal | WM Property Management Inc. and SM Investment Corp. | |
| Walter Mart Trece Martires | Trece Martires | Cavite | WM Property Management Inc. and SM Investment Corp. | |
| Xentro Mall Angono / Angono-Binangonan AB Central | Angono | Rizal | AMRC Holdings Co. Inc. | Anchored by SM Savemore Market |
| Xentro Mall Antipolo | Antipolo | Rizal | AMRC Holdings Co. Inc. | Anchored by SM Savemore Market |
| Xentro Mall Batangas | Batangas City | Batangas | AMRC Holdings Co. Inc. | Anchored by SM Savemore Market |
| Xentro Mall Lemery | Lemery | Batangas | AMRC Holdings Co. Inc. | Anchored by SM Savemore Market |
| Xentro Mall Montalban | Rodriguez | Rizal | AMRC Holdings Co. Inc. | Anchored by SM Savemore Market |

==== Lifestyle malls ====
Lifestyle centers are located in upscale business districts and affluent areas like Nuvali and Southwoods City. Many of these boutique malls are open-air and are popular dining and entertainment venues.

| Name | City/municipality | Province | Developer | Remarks | Image |
|---|---|---|---|---|---|
| Ayala Malls Evo City | Kawit | Cavite | Ayala Land | | |
| Ayala Malls Nuvali | Santa Rosa | Laguna | Ayala Land | Anchored by Robinsons Supermarket & Landmark; Formerly known as Ayala Malls Solenad | |
| Ayala Malls Serin | Tagaytay | Cavite | Ayala Land | Anchored by Walter Mart Department Store & Walter Mart Supermarket | |
| Ayala Malls Vermosa | Imus | Cavite | Ayala Land | | |
| Fora Mall | Tagaytay | Cavite | Filinvest Land | First mall in Tagaytay with cinemas, anchored by Super Metro Hypermarket | |
| Galleria South | San Pedro | Laguna | Robinsons Land | First Robinsons Galleria mall in South Luzon/Calabarzon and third in the Philippines. First Robinsons mall not to use the "Robinsons" name since Robinsons Tagaytay was formerly called Summit Ridge Promenade. | |
| NOMO - A Vista Lifestyle Center | Bacoor | Cavite | Vista Land & Lifescapes | | |
| Robinsons Antipolo | Antipolo | Rizal | Robinsons Land | | |
| Robinsons Tagaytay | Tagaytay | Cavite | Robinsons Land | Formerly as Summit Ridge Promenade | |
| SM Nuvali | Santa Rosa | Laguna | SM Prime Holdings | Formerly as SM Santa Rosa Yulo & SM Neo Verde | |
| Southwoods Mall | Biñan | Laguna | Megaworld | | |
| Twin Lakes | Tagaytay | Cavite | Megaworld Lifestyle Malls | | |

==== Upcoming malls ====
| Name | City/municipality | Province | Developer | Remarks | Type | Image |

=== Caraga ===
| Name | City/municipality | Province | Developer | Remarks |
|---|---|---|---|---|
| Gaisano Capital Bislig | Bislig | Surigao del Sur | Gaisano Capital | |
| Gaisano Capital Surigao | Surigao City | Surigao del Norte | Gaisano Capital | |
| Gaisano Capital San Francisco | San Francisco | Agusan del Sur | Gaisano Capital | |
| Gaisano Capital Tandag | Tandag | Surigao del Sur | Gaisano Capital | |
| Gaisano Grand Marketplace Bayugan | Bayugan | Agusan del Sur | Gaisano Grand Malls | |
| Gaisano Mall Butuan | Butuan | Agusan del Norte | Unipace Corporation | |
| Gaisano Grand Mall San Francisco | San Francisco | Agusan del Sur | Gaisano Grand Malls | The first Gaisano Grand Mall in the province and the region. |
| Gaisano Grand Mall Tandag | Tandag | Surigao del Sur | | |
| Metro Surigao Shopping Center | Surigao City | Surigao del Norte | | |
| Parkway Mall Surigao | Surigao City | Surigao del Norte | | |
| Prince Hypermart Surigao | Surigao City | Surigao del Norte | | |
| Prince Hypermart Prosperidad | Prosperidad | Agusan del Sur | | |
| Prince Town Bayugan | Bayugan | Agusan del Sur | | |
| Prince Town Bislig | Bislig | Surigao del Sur | | |
| Robinsons Butuan | Butuan | Agusan del Norte | Robinsons Land | Largest Robinsons Mall in Mindanao and The Caraga region |
| Puregold Butuan | Butuan | Agusan del Norte | | Located at former Mancao Square. Purchased by Puregold. |
| SM City Butuan | Butuan | Agusan del Norte | SM Prime | Sixth SM Supermalls in Mindanao, first in Caraga Region, and the only major shopping mall in the country to be established in 2020 during the COVID-19 pandemic |
| CityMall Surigao | Surigao City | Surigao del Norte | Double Dragon Properties | First City Mall in Caraga Region |
| Prince Town Cabadbaran | Cabadbaran | Agusan del Norte | | Located at the old public market |
| Prince Town Bad-as | Placer | Surigao del Norte | | |
| Central Warehouse Club Bayugan | Bayugan | Agusan del Sur | | |
| Central Warehouse Club San Francisco | San Francisco | Agusan del Sur | | |
| Central Warehouse Club Trento | Trento | Agusan del Sur | | |
| RC Shopping Center | Trento | Agusan del Sur | | |
| Vista Mall Butuan (branded as All Home Butuan) | Butuan | Agusan del Norte | Vista Land | Phase 1 consist of All Home and 2 dining restaurants. |
| Puregold Butuan City | Butuan | Agusan del Norte | | Located at the Andaya Subdivision corner Magsaysay Street beside Bus Terminal and in front of public vegetable market |
| Siargao Town Center | Dapa | Surigao del Norte | Shaw Investments, Inc. | Puregold Siargao, owned by Puregold, is one of their tenants, alongside Handyman (Owned by Robinsons Retail), National Bookstore, Bench and Andoks |
| Prince Hypermart Buenavista | Buenavista | Agusan del Norte | | |
| San Francisco Public Shopping Mall | San Francisco | Agusan del Sur | Municipal Government of San Francisco | Owned by San Francisco Municipal Local Government Unit |
| 167 Shopper's Mart | Butuan | Agusan del Norte | | |
| Unitop Butuan | Butuan | Agusan del Norte | | Located at former Mancao Square. Purchased by Unitop. |
| Gaisano City Cabadbaran | Cabadbaran | Agusan del Norte | | Unipace Corporation |

=== Central Luzon ===
| Name | City/municipality | Province | Developer | Remarks |
|---|---|---|---|---|
| Balagtas Town Center | Balagtas | Bulacan | AMRC Holdings Co. Inc. | |
| C&S Shopping Complex Tarlac | Tarlac City | Tarlac | | |
| Capitol Square Balanga | Balanga | Bataan | | |
| Center Plaza Mall | Balanga | Bataan | | |
| Cindy's Plaza Tarlac | Tarlac City | Tarlac | | |
| City Center-Ligtasan, Tarlac City (Formerly EZ City Center Tarlac) | Ligtasan, Tarlac City | Tarlac | | |
| City Center-Matatalaib, Tarlac City (Formerly Sector7 Mall Tarlac) | Matatalaib, Tarlac City | Tarlac | | |
| CityMall Arayat | Arayat | Pampanga | DoubleDragon Corporation | Second CityMall in Pampanga. |
| CityMall Bocaue | Bocaue | Bulacan | DoubleDragon Corporation | First CityMall in Bulacan. |
| CityMall Dau | Mabalacat | Pampanga | DoubleDragon Corporation | First CityMall in Pampanga. |
| CityMall Dinalupihan | Dinalupihan | Bataan | DoubleDragon Corporation | Under Construction. First CityMall in Bataan. |
| CityMall Santa Rosa, Nueva Ecija | Santa Rosa | Nueva Ecija | DoubleDragon Corporation | First CityMall in Nueva Ecija. |
| CityMall SCTEX | Concepcion | Tarlac | DoubleDragon Corporation | First CityMall in Tarlac. |
| CityMall Tarlac City | McArthur Highway, San Rafael, Tarlac City | Tarlac | DoubleDragon Corporation | Second CityMall in Tarlac. |
| Fiesta Mall Paniqui | Paniqui | Tarlac | | |
| Citywalk Mall Tarlac | Zamora St., San Roque Tarlac City | Tarlac | | |
| Galeria Victoria | Balanga | Bataan | New San Jose Builders | |
| GraceLand Mall | Malolos | Bulacan | GraceLand23 Inc. | |
| Harbor Point | Olongapo | Zambales | Ayala Land | |
| Magic Mall Malasin, San Jose City | San Jose | Nueva Ecija | Magic Group of Companies | Second Magic Mall in Nueva Ecija. |
| Magic Mall Rizal, San Jose City | San Jose | Nueva Ecija | Magic Group of Companies | First Magic Mall in Nueva Ecija. |
| Magic Star Mall Paniqui | Paniqui | Tarlac | Magic Group of Companies | Second Magic Star Mall in Tarlac Province. |
| Magic Star Mall Tarlac | Tarlac City | Tarlac | Magic Group of Companies | First Magic Star Mall in Tarlac Province. |
| Market City Tarlac | Aquino Blvd., Town Center Tarlac City | Tarlac | SMCT Realty & Holdings Co. Inc. | |
| MetroShoppers Mall Tarlac | Tarlac City | Tarlac | | Formerly known as Palm Plaza Mall in Tarlac. |
| My Metro Town Mall Tarlac | Sto. Cristo, Tarlac City | Tarlac | SMCT Realty & Holdings Co. Inc. | |
| NE Mall | Cabanatuan | Nueva Ecija | NE Group of Companies | First Mall in Nueva Ecija. |
| NE Pacific Mall | Cabanatuan | Nueva Ecija | NE Group of Companies and Landco Pacific Corp. | First Full-Service Mall in Nueva Ecija. |
| NE Super Bodega | San Jose | Nueva Ecija | Cosco Capital | |
| Primark Town Center Cabiao | Cabiao | Nueva Ecija | Primark Philippine Properties | First Primark Town Center in Nueva Ecija. |
| Primark Town Center Gerona | Gerona | Tarlac | Primark Philippine Properties | First Primark Town Center in Tarlac. |
| Primark Town Center Plaridel | Plaridel | Bulacan | Primark Philippine Properties | Second Primark Town Center in Bulacan. |
| Primark Town Center San Jose del Monte | San Jose del Monte | Bulacan | Primark Philippine Properties | First Primark Town Center in Bulacan. |
| Robinsons Luisita | San Miguel | Tarlac | Robinsons Land | First Robinsons Mall in Tarlac. Formerly known as Plaza Luisita Mall in Tarlac. |
| Robinsons Balanga | Balanga | Bataan | Robinsons Land | Under Construction. First Robinsons Mall in Bataan. |
| Robinsons Malolos | Malolos | Bulacan | Robinsons Land | First Full-Service Mall in the First District of Bulacan. |
| Robinsons Starmills Pampanga | San Fernando | Pampanga | Robinsons Land | First Robinsons Mall in Pampanga. |
| Robinsons Townville Cabanatuan | Cabanatuan | Nueva Ecija | Robinsons Land | First Robinsons Mall in Nueva Ecija. |
| Robinsons Townville Pulilan | Pulilan | Bulacan | Robinsons Land | Second Robinsons Mall in Bulacan. |
| SM Center Camiling (planned) | Camiling, Tarlac | Tarlac | SM Prime Holdings | Third SM Mall in Tarlac. |
| SM Center Pulilan | Pulilan | Bulacan | SM Prime Holdings | Fourth SM Mall in Bulacan. |
| SM City Baliwag | Baliwag | Bulacan | SM Prime Holdings | Second SM Mall in Bulacan. |
| SM City Bataan | Balanga | Bataan | SM Prime Holdings | First SM Mall in Bataan. |
| SM City Cabanatuan | Cabanatuan | Nueva Ecija | SM Prime Holdings | Second SM Mall in Cabanatuan and Nueva Ecija. One of the biggest malls in Central Luzon. |
| SM City Gerona (soon) | Gerona | Tarlac | SM Prime Holdings | Second SM Mall in Tarlac. |
| SM City Marilao | Marilao | Bulacan | SM Prime Holdings | First SM Mall in Bulacan. |
| SM City Olongapo Central | Olongapo | Zambales | SM Prime Holdings | Second SM Mall in Zambales and Second SM Mall in Olongapo. |
| SM City Olongapo Downtown | Olongapo | Zambales | SM Prime Holdings | First SM Mall in Zambales and First SM Mall in Olongapo. |
| SM City Pampanga | San Fernando City and Mexico | Pampanga | SM Prime Holdings | First SM Mall in Pampanga, First SM Mall in San Fernando, Pampanga, and First SM Mall in Central Luzon. |
| SM City San Jose, N.E. (soon) | San Jose | Nueva Ecija | SM Prime Holdings | Third SM Mall in Nueva Ecija. |
| SM City San Jose del Monte | San Jose del Monte | Bulacan | SM Prime Holdings | Third SM Mall in Bulacan. |
| SM City San Fernando Downtown | San Fernando City | Pampanga | SM Prime Holdings | Third SM Mall in Pampanga, and Second SM Mall in San Fernando, Pampanga. |
| SM City Tarlac | Tarlac City | Tarlac | SM Prime Holdings | First SM Mall in Tarlac. |
| SM City Telabastagan | San Fernando City | Pampanga | SM Prime Holdings | Fourth SM Mall in Pampanga and Third SM Mall in San Fernando, Pampanga |
| SM Megacenter Cabanatuan | Cabanatuan | Nueva Ecija | SM Prime Holdings | Originally known as Megacenter the Mall, SM Prime acquired the mall from CHAS Realty and Development Corp. in 2013, becoming the First SM Mall in Cabanatuan and Nueva Ecija. |
| Starmall San Jose del Monte | San Jose del Monte | Bulacan | Vista Land & Lifescapes | First Starmall in San Jose del Monte and Bulacan. |
| Sun Plaza Mall Camiling 1 | Camiling | Tarlac | Topwill Marketing Development Corporation | |
| Sun Plaza Mall Camiling 2 | Camiling | Tarlac | Topwill Marketing Development Corporation | Formerly known as Camiling Supermarket, Inc. |
| Sun Plaza Mall Gerona | Gerona | Tarlac | Topwill Marketing Development Corporation | |
| Sun Plaza Mall Sta. Ignacia | Sta. Ignacia | Tarlac | Topwill Marketing Development Corporation | |
| Sun Plaza Mall Tarlac City | Camiling | Tarlac | Topwill Marketing Development Corporation | |
| Uniwide Tarlac Central Mall | Tarlac City | Tarlac | | First Uniwide in Northern Luzon. |
| Vergara Mall | Dinalupihan | Bataan | | |
| Vista Mall Bataan | Balanga | Bataan | Vista Land & Lifescapes | First Vista Mall in Bataan. |
| Vista Mall Malolos | Malolos | Bulacan | Vista Land & Lifescapes | First Vista Mall in Bulacan. |
| Walter Mart Altaraza, San Jose del Monte | San Jose del Monte | Bulacan | Walter Mart Inc. | Fifth Walter Mart in Bulacan. |
| Walter Mart Arayat | Arayat | Pampanga | Walter Mart Inc. | Under Construction. Second Walter Mart in Pampanga. |
| Walter Mart Balanga | Balanga | Bataan | Walter Mart Inc. | First Walter Mart in Bataan. |
| Walter Mart Baliwag | Baliwag | Bulacan | Walter Mart Inc. | Sixth Walter Mart in Bulacan. |
| Walter Mart Cabanatuan | Cabanatuan | Nueva Ecija | Walter Mart Inc. | Third Walter Mart in Nueva Ecija. |
| Walter Mart Capas | Capas | Tarlac | Walter Mart Inc. | Third Walter Mart in Tarlac. |
| Walter Mart Concepcion | Concepcion | Tarlac | Walter Mart Inc. | Second Walter Mart in Tarlac. |
| Walter Mart Gapan | Gapan | Nueva Ecija | Walter Mart Inc. | First Walter Mart in Nueva Ecija. |
| Walter Mart Guiguinto | Guiguinto | Bulacan | Walter Mart Inc. | Third Walter Mart in Bulacan. |
| Walter Mart Malolos | Malolos | Bulacan | Walter Mart Inc. | Fourth Walter Mart in Bulacan. |
| Walter Mart Paniqui | Paniqui | Tarlac | Walter Mart Inc. | First Walter Mart in Tarlac. |
| Walter Mart Plaridel | Plaridel | Bulacan | Walter Mart Inc. | Second Walter Mart in Bulacan. |
| Walter Mart San Fernando | San Fernando | Pampanga | Walter Mart Inc. | First Walter Mart in Pampanga. |
| Walter Mart San Jose | San Jose | Nueva Ecija | Walter Mart Inc. | Fourth Walter Mart in Nueva Ecija. |
| Walter Mart Sta. Maria | Santa Maria | Bulacan | Walter Mart Inc. | First Walter Mart in Bulacan. |
| Walter Mart Subic | Subic | Zambales | Walter Mart Inc. | First Walter Mart in Zambales. |
| Walter Mart Talavera | Talavera | Nueva Ecija | Walter Mart Inc. | Second Walter Mart in Nueva Ecija. |

=== Central Visayas ===
==== Major shopping centers ====
| Name | City/municipality | Province | Developer | Remarks |
|---|---|---|---|---|
| Ayala Center Cebu | Cebu City | Cebu | Ayala Land | The first Ayala mall outside of Metro Manila; opened in 1994. |
| Ayala Malls Central Bloc | Cebu City | Cebu | Ayala Land | In Cebu IT Park and will be the second Ayala mall in Cebu City when finished in October 2019. |
| Elizabeth Mall | Cebu City | Cebu | Cebu Central Realty Corporation | |
| Island City Mall | Tagbilaran | Bohol | Alturas Supermarket Corp. | The largest shopping mall in Bohol. |
| SM City Cebu | Cebu City | Cebu | SM Prime Holdings | The fourth shopping mall owned and developed by SM Prime Holdings. It is the company's first shopping mall outside of Metro Manila. The mall opened on November 27, 1993. It is also categorized as a Flagship mall with IMAX Theater, 2 Trade Halls, Hotel, and a Convention Center. |
| SM Seaside City | Cebu City | Cebu | SM Prime Holdings | Biggest mall in the Visayas region and fourth largest mall in the Philippines |

==== Community malls ====
| Name | City/municipality | Province | Developer | Remarks |
|---|---|---|---|---|
| 138 Mall | Cebu City | Cebu | Ye Sen Fa Inc. | Formerly known as Plaza Fair |
| AH Shoppers' Mart | Tagbilaran | Bohol | AH Shoppers' Mart Inc. | |
| Alta Citta | Tagbilaran | Bohol | Alturas Supermarket Corp. | Established in 2019 |
| Alturas Mall | Tagbilaran | Bohol | Alturas Supermarket Corp. | |
| Alturas Mall Talibon | Talibon | Bohol | Alturas Supermarket Corp. | |
| Alturas Mall Tubigon | Tubigon | Bohol | Alturas Supermarket Corp. | |
| APM Mall | Cebu City | Cebu | | |
| Banilad Town Centre (BTC) | Cebu City | Cebu | | Established in 2005 |
| Bohol Quality Mall | Tagbilaran | Bohol | Bohol Quality Corp. | |
| Bohol Quality Superstore Jagna | Jagna | Bohol | Bohol Quality Corp. | |
| Bohol Quality Superstore Tubigon | Tubigon | Bohol | Bohol Quality Corp. | |
| Cebu Boardwalk Mall | Mandaue | Cebu | KMC MAG Group | On-Hold |
| CityMall Bacalso | Cebu City | Cebu | DoubleDragon Corporation | |
| CityMall Consolacion | Consolacion | Cebu | DoubleDragon Corporation | |
| CityMall Danao | Danao | Cebu | DoubleDragon Corporation | |
| CityMall Tagbilaran | Tagbilaran | Bohol | DoubleDragon Corporation | |
| Colonnade Mall | Cebu City | Cebu | Colon Heritage Realty Corp. | |
| Colonnade Mandaue | Mandaue | Cebu | Colon Heritage Realty Corp. | |
| Crossroads Mall | Cebu City | Cebu | | |
| Gaisano Capital Casuntingan | Mandaue | Cebu | Gaisano Capital | |
| Gaisano Capital Danao | Danao | Cebu | Gaisano Capital | |
| Gaisano Capital South | Cebu City | Cebu | Gaisano Capital | |
| Gaisano Capital SRP | Talisay | Cebu | Gaisano Capital | |
| Gaisano Capital Tisa | Cebu City | Cebu | Gaisano Capital | |
| Gaisano Center Bogo | Bogo | Cebu | Gaisano Main Bros. | |
| Gaisano Country Mall | Cebu City | Cebu | Gaisano Main Bros. | |
| Gaisano Grand Fiesta Mall | Talisay | Cebu | Gaisano Grand Malls | |
| Gaisano Grand Mall Balamban | Cebu | Cebu | Gaisano Grand Malls | |
| Gaisano Grand Mall Carcar | Carcar | Cebu | Gaisano Grand Malls | |
| Gaisano Grand Mall Cordova | Cordova | Cebu | Gaisano Grand Malls | |
| Gaisano Grand Mall Dumanjug | Dumanjug | Cebu | Gaisano Grand Malls | |
| Gaisano Grand Mall Jai-alai | Cebu City | Cebu | Gaisano Grand Malls | |
| Gaisano Grand Mall Liloan | Liloan | Cebu | Gaisano Grand Malls | |
| Gaisano Grand Mall Mactan | Lapu-Lapu | Cebu | Gaisano Grand Malls | |
| Gaisano Grand Mall Minglanilla | Minglanilla | Cebu | Gaisano Grand Malls | |
| Gaisano Grand Mall Moalboal | Moalboal | Cebu | Gaisano Grand Malls | |
| Gaisano Grand Mall Oslob | Oslob | Cebu | Gaisano Grand Malls | |
| Gaisano Grand Mandaue Centro | Mandaue | Cebu | Gaisano Grand Malls | |
| Gaisano Grand Mandaue North | Mandaue | Cebu | Gaisano Grand Malls | |
| Gaisano Grand Plaza Mactan | Lapu-Lapu | Cebu | Gaisano Grand Malls | |
| Gaisano Grand Talamban | Cebu City | Cebu | Gaisano Grand Malls | |
| Gaisano Grand Mall Toledo | Toledo | Cebu | Gaisano Grand Malls | |
| Gaisano Mactan Island Mall | Lapu-Lapu | Cebu | Gaisano Capital | |
| Gaisano Main | Cebu City | Cebu | Gaisano Main Bros. | |
| Gaisano Mall of Cebu | Cebu City | Cebu | DSG Sons Group Inc. | First GMall branded mall outside Mindanao. |
| Gaisano Town Center Balamban | Balamban | Cebu | Gaisano Main Bros. | |
| Gaisano Town Center Moalboal | Moalboal | Cebu | Gaisano Main Bros. | |
| Galleria Luisa | Tagbilaran City | Bohol | Bohol Quality Corp. | Established in 2013 |
| Insular Square Mall | Mandaue | Cebu | A. Lim Corp. | |
| JY Square Discovery Mall | Cebu City | Cebu | Jovima Management and Development Corp. | |
| Lite Port Center | Tagbilaran | Bohol | Lite Shipping Corporation | A strip mall inaugurated on July 21, 2017. |
| Luiton Center | Tagbilaran | Bohol | Bohol Quality Corp. | Established in 2019 |
| Mactan Marina Mall | Lapu-Lapu | Cebu | | |
| Metro Ayala | Cebu City | Cebu | Metro Retail Stores Group | |
| Metro Banilad | Mandaue | Cebu | Metro Retail Stores Group | |
| Metro Colon | Cebu City | Cebu | Metro Retail Stores Group | |
| Metro Danao | Danao | Cebu | Metro Retail Stores Group | |
| Metro IT Park | Cebu City | Cebu | Metro Retail Stores Group | |
| Metro Mandaue | Cebu | Cebu | Metro Retail Stores Group | |
| Metro Naga | Naga | Cebu | Metro Retail Stores Group | |
| Moadto Strip Mall | Panglao | Bohol | Monorealty Inc. | The first strip mall resort in Bohol, established in 2019. |
| Pacific Mall | Mandaue | Cebu | | |
| Parkmall | Mandaue | Cebu | | |
| Plaza Magellan | Lapu-Lapu | Cebu | Megaworld Corporation | |
| Plaza Marcela | Tagbilaran | Bohol | Alturas Supermarket Corp. | |
| Primark Town Center Mactan | Lapu-Lapu | Cebu | | |
| Puregold Guadalupe | Cebu City | Cebu | Puregold | Former Fooda Saversmart outlets. |
| Puregold Kasambagan | Mandaue | Cebu | Puregold | Former Fooda Saversmart outlets. |
| Puregold Mango | Cebu City | Cebu | Puregold | Former Fooda Saversmart outlets. |
| Puregold Talisay | Talisay | Cebu | Puregold | Former Fooda Saversmart outlet. First Puregold branch in Cebu. |
| Raj Shopping Center | Guindulman | Bohol | | |
| Robinsons Cybergate Cebu | Cebu City | Cebu | Robinsons Land | |
| Robinsons Fuente | Cebu City | Cebu | Robinsons Land | |
| S&R Cebu | Mandaue | Cebu | S&R Membership Shopping | |
| Shopwise | Cebu City | Cebu | | |
| South Town Centre | Talisay | Cebu | | Opened in 2014 |
| Starmall Talisay | Talisay | Cebu | Vista Land & Lifescapes | First Starmall in the Visayas region, opened in 2014 |
| SM City Consolacion | Consolacion | Cebu | SM Prime Holdings | Second shopping mall owned and developed by SM Prime Holdings in Cebu. |
| SM Hypermarket Cebu | Mandaue | Cebu | SM Retail | |
| SM Hypermarket Lapu-Lapu | Lapu-Lapu | Cebu | SM Retail | |
| SM Savemore Naga | Naga | Cebu | SM Retail | |
| Super Metro Carcar | Carcar | Cebu | Metro Retail Stores Group | |
| Super Metro Colon | Cebu City | Cebu | Metro Retail Stores Group | |
| Super Metro Mambaling | Cebu City | Cebu | Metro Retail Stores Group | |
| Super Metro Mandaue | Mandaue | Cebu | Metro Retail Stores Group | |
| Super Metro Lapu-Lapu | Lapu-Lapu | Cebu | Metro Retail Stores Group | |
| Super Metro Toledo | Toledo | Cebu | Metro Retail Stores Group | |
| Tagbilaran City Square | Tagbilaran | Bohol | | Formerly the site of old Agora Public Market. |

==== Lifestyle malls ====
| Name | City/municipality | Province | Developer | Remarks |
|---|---|---|---|---|
| IL Corso Lifemalls | Cebu City | Cebu | Filinvest | A lifestyle mall located beside the Nustar Resort and Casino in South Road Properties |
| Robinsons Galleria Cebu | Cebu City | Cebu | Robinsons Land | |
| SM J Mall | Mandaue | Cebu | SM Prime Holdings | Formerly known as J Centre Mall. Closed in January 31, 2023, to be converted into an SM Supermall in 2024. |

==== Outlet malls ====
| Name | City/municipality | Province | Developer | Remarks |
|---|---|---|---|---|
| City Times Square | Mandaue | Cebu | | Cebu's first "Times Square" inspired mall |
| City Times Square Mactan | Lapu-Lapu | Cebu | | |
| H Mall | Lapu-Lapu | Cebu | | |
| LG Garden Walk Mactan | Lapu-Lapu | Cebu | | |
| One Pavilion Mall | Cebu City | Cebu | GoldPeach Properties | |
| Sands Gateway Mall | Danao | Cebu | Sands Danao Realty and Development Corp. | |
| The Outlets at Pueblo Verde | Lapu-Lapu | Cebu | AboitizLand Inc. | |
| Vibo Place Mall | Cebu City | Cebu | Vibo Group of Companies | |

=== Cordillera Administrative Region (CAR) ===
| Name | City/municipality | Province | Developer | Remarks | Opening date |
|---|---|---|---|---|---|
| Abanao Square | Baguio | | Pacific Land and Building Corp. | Anchored by National Bookstore, Timezone, DIY shop, Japan Home Center, and BDO. | |
| Baguio Ayala Technohub | Baguio | | Ayala Land | BPOs and other technological establishments thrive here | |
| Baguio Centermall | Baguio | | | First big shopping mall in Baguio; anchored by Mart One & Mercury Drugstore | |
| Cedar Peak Mall | Baguio | | | Savemore Market and Watsons. Near Baguio Country Mart and NOVO. Hybrid of mall and residences. | |
| Cooyeesan Plaza Mall | Baguio | | | Puregold, DIY Hardware & Japan Home Center. | |
| Centerpoint Plaza | Baguio | | | Anchored by Puregold, Robinsons & BDO. | |
| Leonard Wood Terraces | Baguio | | | Anchored by Marketplace by Rustan's, the only Rustan's affiliate in the North Luzon. | |
| Maharlika Complex | Baguio | | | The first mall in the region; near Baguio City Market, multipurpose building that houses anything from bars and government services, to technological repair shops and banking institution. | |
| Porta Vaga Mall | Baguio | Benguet | Found near the Baguio Cathedral. Also divided into segments, like main mall, Puso ng Baguio and Antipolo Building. Anchored by Robinsons Supermarket. | Anchored by Robinsons Supermarket | |
| Puregold La Trinidad | La Trinidad | Benguet | | First Puregold outside Baguio and first in Benguet | 18 Jan 2012 |
| Puregold Tabuk | Tabuk City | Kalinga | | First Puregold in Kalinga | 5 Nov 2025 |
| Savemore La Trinidad | La Trinidad | Benguet | | | |
| SM City Baguio | Baguio | | SM Prime Holdings | Biggest shopping mall in the city. Only SM Mall that has no air conditioning. | 21 Nov 2003 |

=== Davao Region ===
| Name | City/municipality | Province | Developer | Remarks |
|---|---|---|---|---|
| 168 Mall | Davao City | Davao del Sur | Filipino-Chinese Traders Association (Davao City) | |
| Abreeza | Davao City | Davao del Sur | Ayala Land | First Ayala mall in Mindanao |
| Center Point Plaza | Davao City | Davao del Sur | New City Commercial Corp. | |
| Chimes Mall | Davao City | Davao del Sur | Felcris Corp. | First upscale strip mall in the Davao Region |
| CityMall Tagum | Tagum | Davao del Norte | DoubleDragon Corporation | First CityMall in Davao Region and was anchored by SM Savemore Market. It has also the first Simply Shoes store in Mindanao. |
| DCLA Shopping Center | Davao City | Davao del Sur | | |
| Felcris Centrale | Davao City | Davao del Sur | Felcris Corp. | |
| Gaisano Grand Mall Carmen | Carmen | Davao del Norte | Gaisano Grand Malls | |
| Gaisano Grand Mall Digos | Digos | Davao del Sur | Gaisano Grand Malls | |
| Gaisano Grand Mall Panabo | Panabo | Davao del Norte | Gaisano Grand Malls | |
| Gaisano Grand Mall Tagum | Tagum | Davao del Norte | Gaisano Grand Malls | |
| Gaisano Grand Mall of Tibungco | Davao City | Davao del Sur | Gaisano Grand Malls | |
| Gaisano Grand Mall Toril | Davao City | Davao del Sur | Gaisano Grand Malls | |
| Gaisano Mall of Toril | Davao City | Davao del Sur | DSG Sons Group Inc. | Fourth largest Gaisano mall in the Philippines |
| Gaisano Mall of Davao | Davao City | Davao del Sur | DSG Sons Group Inc. | Largest Gaisano mall in the Philippines |
| Gaisano Mall of Tagum | Tagum | Davao del Norte | DSG Sons Group Inc. | |
| Gaisano Mall of Digos | Digos | Davao del Sur | DSG Sons Group Inc. | Third largest Gaisano mall in the Philippines |
| Gaisano Grand Citimall Davao-Ilustre | Davao City | Davao del Sur | Gaisano Grand Malls | |
| NCCC Mall Buhangin | Davao City | Davao del Sur | New City Commercial Corp. | |
| NCCC Mall Davao | Davao City | Davao del Sur | New City Commercial Corp. | Site of the deadly 2017 Davao City mall fire. |
| NCCC Main Uyanguren | Davao City | Davao del Sur | New City Commercial Corp. | |
| NCCC Mall Tagum | Tagum | Davao del Norte | New City Commercial Corp. | |
| Robinsons Cybergate Davao | Davao City | Davao del Sur | Robinsons Land | |
| Robinsons Tagum | Tagum | Davao del Norte | Robinsons Land | The first world-class mall in Davao del Norte that house the six state-of-the-art cinemas that include a 3D theater by Robinsons Movieworld. |
| SM City Davao | Davao City | Davao del Sur | SM Prime Holdings | Opened to the public on November 17, 2001; first SM Supermall in Mindanao |
| SM Lanang | Davao City | Davao del Sur | SM Prime Holdings | Second SM Supermall in Davao City and fourth SM Supermall in Mindanao. It is located in the northern part of the city, and the first premier shopping mall in southern Philippines. It boasts its atrium, which is Davao City's largest and most spacious. |
| S&R Davao | Davao City; Matina | Davao del Sur | S&R Membership Shopping | The first S&R in Mindanao |
| Sunscor Grocerama | Davao City; Toril District | Davao del Sur | Sunscor Realty Corp. | |

=== Eastern Visayas ===
| Name | City/municipality | Prоvince | Developer | Remarks | Opening Date |
|---|---|---|---|---|---|
| Gaisano Grand Calbayog | Calbayog | Samar | Gaisano Grand Malls | | |
| Gaisano Capital Real | Tacloban | Leyte | Gaisano Capital | | |
| Gaisano Capital Sogod | Sogod | Southern Leyte | Gaisano Capital | | |
| Gaisano Capital Tacloban | Tacloban | Leyte | Gaisano Capital | | |
| Gaisano Central Tacloban | Tacloban | Leyte | Gaisano | | |
| Gaisano Grand Catarman | Catarman | Northern Samar | Gaisano Grand Malls | | 27 Nov 2015 |
| Gaisano Riverside Mall | Ormoc | Leyte | Gaisano | | |
| Gaisano Saversmart Ormoc | Ormoc | Leyte | Gaisano | | |
| Metro Baybay | Baybay | Leyte | Metro Retail Stores Group, Inc. | | 30 Jul 2019 |
| Metro Hi-per Maasin | Maasin | Southern Leyte | Metro Retail Stores Group, Inc. | The first Metro Gaisano store opened in Visayas outside of Cebu | Oct 2011 |
| Primark Town Center Caibaan | Tacloban | Leyte | Primark Town Center | First Primark Town Center in the Visayas | 14 Mar 2019 |
| Primark Town Center Catbalogan | Catbalogan | Samar | Primark Town Center | | Suspended |
| Prince Town Baybay | Baybay | Leyte | | | |
| Robinsons North Tacloban | Tacloban | Leyte | Robinsons Land | | 14 Dec 2017 |
| Robinsons Ormoc | Ormoc City | Leyte | Robinsons Land | | 19 Apr 2018 |
| Robinsons Tacloban | Tacloban | Leyte | Robinsons Land | The Largest and Biggest Mall of Eastern Visayas | 11 Jun 2009 |
| Sm Savemore Tacloban | Tacloban | Leyte | SM Prime Holdings | | |
| SM center Ormoc | Ormoc City | Leyte | SM Prime Holdings | | 16 Nov 2018 |
| Super Metro Calbayog | Calbayog | Samar | Metro Retail Stores Group, Inc. | | 12 Feb 2016 |
| Uptown Mall | Borongan | Eastern Samar | | | |
| Gaisano Grand Maasin | Maasin | Southern Leyte | Gaisano Grand Malls | The first major shopping mall in Southern Leyte | 16 May 2024 |
| Metro Gaisano | Tacloban | Leyte | Metro Retail Stores Group, Inc. | | |
| Metro Gaisano | Catbalogan | Samar | Metro Retail Stores Group, Inc. | The First Mall in Catbalogan | 24 Aug 2024 |

=== Ilocos Region ===
| Name | Image | City/municipality | Province | Developer | Remarks |
|---|---|---|---|---|---|
| BHF Plaza | | Dagupan | Pangasinan | BHF Group of Companies | Anchored by Puregold and hosts essential government offices such SSS, Philhealth and Pagibig |
| CB Mall | | Urdaneta | Pangasinan | CBE Estrada Group of Companies | |
| CityMall Mayombo, Dagupan | | Dagupan | Pangasinan | | First CityMall in Pangasinan and Region 1 |
| CityMall San Carlos City, Pangasinan | | San Carlos | Pangasinan | | |
| CSI Market Square | | Dagupan | Pangasinan | City Supermarket, Inc. | Considered as the first full-service mall in Pangasinan |
| CSI The City Mall Dagupan-Lucao | | Dagupan | Pangasinan | City Supermarket, Inc. | The largest among CSI Malls in the region |
| CSI The City Mall La Union | | San Fernando | La Union | City Supermarket, Inc. | The first Mall in La Union |
| JTC Mall | | Bantay | Ilocos Sur | | |
| Magic Mall San Carlos | | San Carlos | Pangasinan | | |
| Magic Mall Urdaneta | | Urdaneta | Pangasinan | | |
| Magic CenterPoint Dagupan | | Dagupan | Pangasinan | | The first Magic Shopping Center |
| Magic Calasiao-Victoria Place | | Calasiao | Pangasinan | | The first Magic shopping mall in Calasiao |
| Manna Mall | | San Fernando | La Union | | Anchored by Puregold, National Bookstore, Robinsons Appliances, CDR-King; The third mall in La Union |
| Nepo Mall Dagupan | | Dagupan | Pangasinan | | First full-service mall anchored by Robinsons Supermarket and Department Store in Pangasinan and Region 1 |
| Primark Town Center Aringay | | Aringay | La Union | Primark Philippine Properties | Anchored by Savemore; The fourth mall in La Union, first Primark in La Union |
| Robinsons Ilocos | | San Nicolas | Ilocos Norte | Robinsons Land | First full-service mall in Ilocos Norte |
| Robinsons Pangasinan | | Calasiao | Pangasinan | Robinsons Land | First Robinsons Mall in Pangasinan, second in Region 1 |
| Robinsons La Union | | San Fernando | La Union | Robinsons Land | Second largest shopping mall in La Union |
| San Carlos Town Center | | San Carlos | Pangasinan | | |
| SM City Laoag | | Ilocos Norte | Laoag | SM Prime Holdings | First SM Mall in Laoag and First SM Mall in Ilocos Norte |
| SM City La Union | | San Fernando | La Union | SM Prime Holdings | First SM Mall in La Union; largest shopping mall in La Union |
| SM City Rosales | | Rosales | Pangasinan | SM Prime Holdings | First SM Mall in Pangasinan |
| SM City Urdaneta Central | | Urdaneta | Pangasinan | SM Prime Holdings | Second SM Mall in Pangasinan |
| SM Center Dagupan | | Dagupan | Pangasinan | SM Prime Holdings | Third SM Mall in Pangasinan and First SM Mall in Dagupan |
| Xentro Mall Vigan | | Vigan | Ilocos Sur | AMRC Holdings Co. | |

=== Mimaropa ===
| Name | City/municipality | Province | Developer | Remarks | Opening Year |
|---|---|---|---|---|---|
| Nuciti Central Mall Calapan | Calapan | Oriental Mindoro | Citimart | | |
| Gaisano Capital Calapan | Calapan | Oriental Mindoro | Gaisano | | |
| Gaisano Capital San Jose | San Jose | Occidental Mindoro | Gaisano | | |
| NCCC Mall Puerto Princesa | Puerto Princesa | Palawan | New City Commercial Corp. | | |
| Xentro Mall Calapan/Neo Calapan Mall | Calapan | Oriental Mindoro | AMRC Holdings Co. Inc. | First and Only Full-Service Mall in Calapan | 7 Oct 2011 |
| Robinsons Palawan | Puerto Princesa | Palawan | Robinsons Land | | 24 May 2012 |
| SM City Puerto Princesa | Puerto Princesa | Palawan | SM Prime Holdings | First SM Mall in Mimaropa | 15 Sep 2017 |

=== Northern Mindanao ===
| Name | City/municipality | Province | Developer | Remarks |
|---|---|---|---|---|
| Centrio | Cagayan de Oro | Misamis Oriental | Ayala Land | |
| CityMall Bulua | Cagayan de Oro | Misamis Oriental | DoubleDragon Corporation | |
| CityMall Iponan | Cagayan de Oro | Misamis Oriental | DoubleDragon Corporation | |
| Gaisano Mall Iligan | Iligan | Lanao del Norte | Gaisano | |
| Gaisano Mall Tubod | Tubod | Lanao del Norte | Gaisano | Officially opened on 15 May 2021 |
| Gaisano Malaybalay | Malaybalay | Bukidnon | Gaisano | |
| Gaisano City Valencia | Valencia City | Bukidnon | Gaisano | |
| Gaisano City Carmen | Cagayan de Oro | Misamis Oriental | Gaisano | |
| Gaisano Capital Balingasag | Balingasag | Misamis Oriental | Gaisano | |
| Gaisano Capital Ozamiz | Ozamiz | Misamis Occidental | Gaisano | |
| Gaisano Super Citi Mall Iligan | Iligan | Lanao del Norte | | |
| Geege Mall | Ozamiz | Misamis Occidental | | |
| Iligan Fiesta Mall | Iligan | Lanao del Norte | | |
| Limketkai Center | Cagayan de Oro | Misamis Oriental | Limketkai Sons Inc. | First shopping complex in Mindanao, also one of the largest mall complex in Mindanao |
| SBG Strip Mall | Iligan | Lanao del Norte | | |
| Squarelland Shopping Centre | Iligan | Lanao del Norte | | |
| Robinsons Iligan | Iligan | Lanao del Norte | Robinsons Land | Officially opened on 26 July 2017 |
| Robinsons Cagayan de Oro | Cagayan de Oro | Misamis Oriental | Robinsons Land | First Robinsons mall in Mindanao, officially opened in 2002 |
| Robinsons Valencia | Valencia | Bukidnon | Robinsons Land | Officially opened on 12 December 2018 |
| Gaisano City Mall | Cagayan de Oro | Misamis Oriental | Gaisano Sons Inc. | |
| Gaisano Puerto | Cagayan de Oro | Misamis Oriental | Gaisano Sons Inc. | |
| Gaisano Bulua | Cagayan de Oro | Misamis Oriental | Gaisano Sons Inc. | |
| Prince Hypermart Kapatagan | Kapatagan | Lanao del Norte | Prince Hypermart | Officially opened on 7 October 2018 |
| Prince Hypermart Oroquieta | Oroquieta City | Misamis Occidental | Prince Hypermart | Officially opened on 14 December 2013 |
| Prince Hypermart Tangub | Tangub City | Misamis Occidental | Prince Hypermart | Officially opened on 9 October 2020 |
| Puregold Cagayan de Oro | Cagayan de Oro | Misamis Oriental | Puregold Price Club | Officially opened on 13 December 2013 |
| Puregold Iligan | Iligan | Lanao del Norte | Puregold Price Club | Officially opened on 29 January 2021 |
| S&R Cagayan de Oro | Cagayan de Oro | Misamis Oriental | S&R Membership Shopping | |
| Vista Mall | Cagayan de Oro | Misamis Oriental | Vista Land & Lifescapes | |
| SM CDO Downtown | Cagayan de Oro | Misamis Oriental | SM Prime Holdings | Largest SM Shopping Mall in Mindanao |
| SM City CDO Uptown | Cagayan de Oro | Misamis Oriental | SM Prime Holdings | Formerly known as "SM City Cagayan de Oro" (2002–2022), First SM Mall in Northern Mindanao and First SM Mall in Cagayan de Oro. The Northwing opened on June 30, 2022 |
| Village Center CDO | Cagayan de Oro | Misamis Oriental | Vista Land & Lifescapes | First Vista Mall in Mindanao |
| Ororama Supercenter Cogon | Cagayan de Oro | Misamis Oriental | Ororama Supercenters Inc. | |
| Ororama Supercenter Carmen | Cagayan de Oro | Misamis Oriental | Ororama Supercenters Inc. | |
| Market City | Cagayan de Oro | Misamis Oriental | | |
| Prince Town Gingoog | Gingoog | Misamis Oriental | Prince Warehouse Club Inc. | |

=== Soccsksargen ===
| Name | City/municipality | Province | Developer | Remarks | Opening date |
|---|---|---|---|---|---|
| Ace CenterPoint | Koronadal | South Cotabato | Ace Centerpoint | | 1999 |
| Fitmart GenSan | General Santos | South Cotabato | Fitmart | | Dec 2002 |
| Gaisano Grand Mall Kidapawan | Kidapawan | Cotabato | Gaisano Capital | | 25 May 2013 |
| Gaisano Grand Mall Koronadal | Koronadal | South Cotabato | Gaisano Capital | | |
| Gaisano Grand Mall Polomolok | Polomok | South Cotabato | Gaisano Capital | | 16 May 2013 |
| Gaisano Mall General Santos | General Santos | South Cotabato | Gaisano Malls | | |
| KCC Mall of General Santos | General Santos | South Cotabato | Koronadal Commercial Corp. | | 1992; 1996 |
| KCC Mall of Marbel | Koronadal | South Cotabato | Koronadal Commercial Corp. | | 1956; 2000 |
| KMCC Mall | Kidapawan | Cotabato | Kidapawan Megacenter Corp. | | |
| Primark Town Center Tacurong | Tacurong | Sultan Kudarat | Primark Philippine Properties | The first ever Primark in Mindanao | 26 Apr 2018 |
| Robinsons GenSan | General Santos | South Cotabato | Robinsons Malls | | 5 Oct 2009 |
| SM City General Santos | General Santos | South Cotabato | SM Prime Holdings | | 10 Aug 2012 |
| Tacurong Fitmart Supermarket | Tacurong | Sultan Kudarat | | | |
| Tacurong Kimsan Plaza | Tacurong | Sultan Kudarat | | | |
| Veranza Mall | General Santos | South Cotabato | Veranza Mall | The first environmentally inspired mall of the region | 29 Jun 2013 |
| CityMall Koronadal | Koronadal | South Cotabato | DoubleDragon Corporation | First CityMall in Soccsksargen | 28 Nov 2017 |
| CityMall Isulan | Isulan | Sultan Kudarat | DoubleDragon Corporation | | 30 Oct 2017 |
| Isulan Central Plaza | Isulan | Sultan Kudarat | Soccsksargen | Opened late 2000s | |
| Valencia Department Store | Isulan | Sultan Kudarat | Soccsksargen | 1st department store in Isulan | |

=== Western Visayas ===
| Name | Image | City/municipality | Province | Developer | Remarks | Opening date |
|---|---|---|---|---|---|---|
| 168 Plaza Mall | | Iloilo City | Iloilo | 168 Group of Companies | | |
| 1688 Mall | | Iloilo City | Iloilo | | | |
| Canyon de Boracay Premiere | | Malay | Aklan | | | |
| City Square | | Iloilo City | Iloilo | | | |
| City Times Square | | Iloilo City | Iloilo | | | |
| CityMall Antique | | San Jose | Antique | DoubleDragon Corporation | | 11 June 2025 |
| CityMall Arnaldo-Roxas | | Roxas City | Capiz | DoubleDragon Corporation | First CityMall in the Philippines | 27 Mar 2015 |
| CityMall Boracay | | Malay | Aklan | DoubleDragon Corporation | | 25 Feb 2017 |
| CityMall Kalibo | | Kalibo | Aklan | DoubleDragon Corporation | | 25 Apr 2016 |
| CityMall Parola | | Iloilo City | Iloilo | DoubleDragon Corporation | | 14 Jul 2016 |
| CityMall Passi | | Passi | Iloilo | DoubleDragon Corporation | | Sep 26 2017 |
| CityMall Pavia | | Pavia | Iloilo | DoubleDragon Corporation | | 23 Mar 2018 |
| CityMall Roxas Avenue | | Roxas City | Capiz | DoubleDragon Corporation | Second CityMall in Roxas City | 14 Nov 2018 |
| CityMall Tagbak, Jaro | | Iloilo City | Iloilo | DoubleDragon Corporation | | 10 Oct 2015 |
| Cubix Park | | Iloilo City | Iloilo | | | 2022 |
| d'Mall de Boracay | | Malay | Aklan | | First outdoor mall in Panay | |
| Festive Walk Mall | | Iloilo City | Iloilo | Megaworld Corporation | The first Megaworld lifestyle mall outside Metro Manila | 30 Jun 2018 |
| Gaisano Capital Balasan | | Balasan | Iloilo | Gaisano | | 11 Feb 2017 |
| Gaisano Capital Boracay | | Malay | Aklan | | | 19 Oct 2019 |
| Gaisano Capital Guanco | | Iloilo City | Iloilo | Gaisano | | |
| Gaisano Capital Iloilo City Center Mall | | Iloilo City | Iloilo | Gaisano | | 5 May 2018 |
| Gaisano Capital Kalibo | | Kalibo | Aklan | Gaisano | | 30 Nov 2002 |
| Gaisano Capital Lapaz | | Iloilo City | Iloilo | Gaisano | Formerly known as Gaisano City Iloilo | |
| Gaisano Capital Oton | | Oton | Iloilo | Gaisano | | June 2012 |
| Gaisano Capital Passi | | Passi | Iloilo | Gaisano | | |
| Gaisano Grand Arcade Roxas | | Roxas City | Capiz | Gaisano Grand | The first Gaisano shopping arcade in Western Visayas | |
| Gaisano Grand Estancia | | Estancia | Iloilo | Gaisano Grand | | 29 Mar 2019 |
| Gaisano Grand Mall of Antique | | San Jose de Buenavista | Antique | Gaisano Grand | Closed in 2021 due to a fire incident | |
| Gaisano Grand Market Place Roxas | | Roxas City | Capiz | Gaisano Grand | | 2006 |
| Gaisano Grand Roxas | | Roxas City | Capiz | Gaisano Grand | The first mall in Northern Panay and the first full-service mall and the biggest Gaisano mall in Northern Panay. Formerly known as Gaisano City Roxas | 1999 |
| Gaisano Grand Sara | | Sara | Iloilo | Gaisano Grand | | 31 Jul 2019 |
| GT Plaza Mall | | Iloilo City | Iloilo | | | 23 Nov 2012 |
| GT Town Center | | Pavia | Iloilo | | | 29 Jul 2018 |
| KH Shopping Center | | Kalibo | Aklan | Kim Huat Group | | |
| Marymart Center | | Iloilo City | Iloilo | | First premier mall in Western Visayas | |
| Plazuela de Iloilo | | Iloilo City | Iloilo | The Florete Land Inc. | First outdoor mall in Iloilo City | Nov 2010 |
| Plazuela Tres Pavia | | Pavia | Iloilo | The Florete Land Inc. | | |
| Robinsons Antique | | San Jose de Buenavista | Antique | Robinsons Land | | 15 Jul 2015 |
| Robinsons Iloilo | | Iloilo City | Iloilo | Robinsons Land | The first and largest Robinsons mall in Iloilo City | 5 Oct 2001 |
| Robinsons Jaro | | Iloilo City | Iloilo | Robinsons Land | Second Robinsons mall in Iloilo City | 8 Sep 2016 |
| Robinsons Pavia | | Pavia | Iloilo | Robinsons Land | The third Robinsons mall in Iloilo and the first mall to have an Aqua Park in Western Visayas. | 21 Jun 2018 |
| Robinsons Roxas | | Roxas City | Capiz | Robinsons Land | The first and only Robinsons mall in Northern Panay and the biggest mall in Northern Panay | 14 Feb 2014 |
| S&R Iloilo | | Iloilo City | Iloilo | S&R Membership Shopping | | 16 Dec 2016 |
| SM City Iloilo | | Iloilo City | Iloilo | SM Prime Holdings | Largest shopping mall in Western Visayas. | 11 Jun 1999 |
| SM City Roxas | | Roxas City | Capiz | SM Prime Holdings | First SM Mall in Roxas City and is the largest mall in northern Panay. | 8 Apr 2022 |
| SM Delgado | | Iloilo City | Iloilo | SM Prime Holdings | It is the fourth SM Department Store built by Henry Sy Sr. and the first branch opened outside Metro Manila. SM Supermarket was conceptualized and opened its store at SM Delgado in 1979. It was renovated and relaunched in 2004. | 15 May 1979; 8 Dec 2004 |
| Street of Festive Walk | | Iloilo City | Iloilo | Megaworld Corporation | The longest retail and dining strip in Visayas and Mindanao | |
| The Atrium | | Iloilo City | Iloilo | | | |
| The Shops at Amigo | | Iloilo City | Iloilo | | | |
| The Shops at Atria | | Iloilo City | Iloilo | Ayala Land | The second and only outdoor Ayala mall in Western Visayas | 15 Apr 2015 |
| Town Center Pontevedra | | Pontevedra | Capiz | | First Primark Town Center in Northern Panay and Western Visayas | 24 Dec 2020 |
| Unitop Shopping Mall Roxas | | Roxas City | Capiz | Unitop Group of Companies | | 29 Aug 2014 |
| Vista Mall Iloilo | | Oton | Iloilo | Vista Land | The first Vista Mall outside Luzon (full-scale mall) | 17 May 2018 |

=== Negros Island Region (NIR) ===
| Name | Image | City/municipality | Province | Developer | Remarks | Opening date |
|---|---|---|---|---|---|---|
| SM City Bacolod | | Bacolod | Negros Occidental | SM Prime Holdings | | 1 Mar 2007 |
| Robinsons Bacolod | | Bacolod | Negros Occidental | Robinsons Land | First Robinsons mall. | 19 Jul 1997 |
| Robinsons Cybergate Bacolod | | Bacolod | Negros Occidental | Robinsons Land | | 1997 |
| Robinsons Dumaguete | | Dumaguete | Negros Oriental | Robinsons Land | | |
| The District North Point | | Talisay | Negros Occidental | Ayala Land | First Ayala mall in Negros Island Region. | 3 Apr 2013 |
| Ayala Malls Capitol Central | | Bacolod | Negros Occidental | Ayala Land | | 14 Dec 2018 |
| 888 China Town Premier Mall | | Bacolod | Negros Occidental | | | 29 Feb 2008 |
| Gaisano Grand Bacolod Mall | | Bacolod | Negros Occidental | Gaisano Grand | Formerly known as Gaisano City Bacolod | |
| Gaisano Grand City Central Bacolod | | Bacolod | Negros Occidental | Gaisano Grand | | 7 Jul 2023 |
| Gaisano Grand Bacolod Main | | Bacolod | Negros Occidental | Gaisano Grand | | |
| Gaisano Grand Silay | | Silay | Negros Occidental | Gaisano Grand | | 14 Mar 2018 |
| Gaisano Grand Kabankalan | | Kabankalan | Negros Occidental | Gaisano Grand | | |
| Gaisano Capital San Carlos | | San Carlos | Negros Occidental | Gaisano Capital | | |
| Vista Mall Bacolod | | Bacolod | Negros Occidental | Vista Malls | | |
| CityMall Mandalagan | | Bacolod | Negros Occidental | DoubleDragon Corporation | | 8 Nov 2016 |
| CityMall Goldenfields | | Bacolod | Negros Occidental | DoubleDragon Corporation | | 16 Aug 2017 |
| CityMall Cadiz | | Cadiz | Negros Occidental | DoubleDragon Corporation | | 29 Nov 2018 |
| CityMall Kabankalan | | Kabankalan | Negros Occidental | DoubleDragon Corporation | | 14 Feb 2017 |
| CityMall San Carlos, Negros Occidental | | San Carlos | Negros Occidental | DoubleDragon Corporation | | 16 Feb 2017 |
| CityMall Victorias | | Victorias | Negros Occidental | DoubleDragon Corporation | | 15 Feb 2017 |
| CityMall Dumaguete | | Dumaguete | Negros Oriental | DoubleDragon Corporation | | 15 Feb 2017 |
| Landers Bacolod | | Bacolod | Negros Occidental | Landers Superstore | | 10 Aug 2023 |
| S&R Bacolod | | Bacolod | Negros Occidental | S&R Membership Shopping | | 8 Apr 2024 |
| Centroplex Mall | | Bacolod | Negros Occidental | | | |
| VSB Mall | | Bacolod | Negros Occidental | | | |
| Limman's Center | | Bacolod | Negros Occidental | | | |
| Lopue's Araneta | | Bacolod | Negros Occidental | | | |
| Lopue's East Centre | | Bacolod | Negros Occidental | | | 15 Jul 1995 |
| Lopue's Mandalagan | | Bacolod | Negros Occidental | | | 1999 |
| Lopue's Panaad | | Bacolod | Negros Occidental | | | |
| Lopue's San Sebastian | | Bacolod | Negros Occidental | | | |
| Lopue's South Centre | | Bacolod | Negros Occidental | | | |
| Lopue's Hinigaran | | Hinigaran | Negros Occidental | | | |
| Prince Hypermart Larena | | Larena | Siquijor | Prince Hypermart | Became the first supermarket in the province of Siquijor. | 2016 |
| Puregold Bayawan | | Bayawan | Negros Oriental | Puregold | | |
| Filinvest Malls Dumaguete | | Dumaguete | Negros Oriental | Filinvest | | |

=== Zamboanga Peninsula ===
| Name | Image | City/municipality | Province | Developer | Remarks |
|---|---|---|---|---|---|
| Best Emporium Megamall | | Pagadian | Zamboanga del Sur | Best Emporium | |
| City Commercial Center | | Pagadian | Zamboanga del Sur | City Government of Pagadian | Anchored by Robinsons Supermarket |
| Robinsons Pagadian | | Pagadian | Zamboanga del Sur | Robinsons Land | The first Robinsons Mall in Zamboanga Peninsula. |
| CityMall Dipolog | | Dipolog | Zamboanga del Norte | DoubleDragon Corporation | Anchored by SM Savemore. |
| Grand CityMall Guiwan | | Zamboanga City | Zamboanga del Sur | DoubleDragon Corporation | Anchored by Shop-O-Rama Supermarket |
| CityMall Tetuan-Zamboanga | | Zamboanga City | Zamboanga del Sur | DoubleDragon Corporation | Anchored by Shop-O-Rama Supermarket, the first CityMall in Mindanao |
| Gaisano Capital Pagadian | | Pagadian | Zamboanga del Sur | Gaisano Capital | The first Gaisano mall in Zamboanga Peninsula; presently the third largest shopping mall in the region |
| Gaisano Grand Mall Ipil | | Ipil | Zamboanga Sibugay | Gaisano Grand Malls | The first shopping mall in Zamboanga Sibugay. Opened in December 2023 |
| Glorious Fantasyland Complex | | Dapitan | Zamboanga del Norte | RomGarJal Development Corporation | |
| KCC Mall de Zamboanga | | Zamboanga City | Zamboanga del Sur | Koronadal Commercial Corp. | Zamboanga's first nationally owned full scale mall; KCC's first mall outside Region XII, largest mall in the region |
| Lee Plaza City Central | | Dipolog | Zamboanga del Norte | Dynamic Development Corp. | Lee Plaza Group's first mall outside Dumaguete and Central Visayas. |
| SM City Mindpro | | Zamboanga City | Zamboanga del Sur | SM Prime Holdings | In 2017, SM Prime Holdings bought the mall. Opened in 2020, SM City Mindpro brought some of the region's firsts. In 2023, Starbucks opened. |
| SM City Zamboanga | | Zamboanga City | Zamboanga del Sur | SM Prime Holdings | Target Opening in 2026, a 5-story mall with an indoor garden, and state-of-the-art SM Cinemas. The mall also boasts to have 91,000 sqm floor area. |
| Southway Square | | Zamboanga City | Zamboanga del Sur | Z.C. Shop-o-rama Inc. | |
| Shoppers' Center The Gateway | | Zamboanga City | Zamboanga del Sur | Metro Gateway Corp. | |
| Yubenco San Jose Gusu | | Zamboanga City | Zamboanga del Sur | Megaland Corp. | |
| Yubenco Starmall Putik | | Zamboanga City | Zamboanga del Sur | Yuscom Trading | It was first constructed in 2002 at the former PLDT Branch Building. |
| Yubenco Tetuan | | Zamboanga City | Zamboanga del Sur | Megaland Corp. | |
| L' Arcada Complex | | Zamboanga City | Zamboanga del Sur | Kennlee Development Corp. | Opened in 2022, Zamboanga City's first Strip-Mall which provided some of the region's first such as; Sharetea, Yoshimeatsu, and Army Navy among others. |
| Yubenco Ayala | | Zamboanga City | Zamboanga del Sur | Megaland Corp. | This is the first shopping mall in Zamboanga City's western coast. |
| Prince Hypermart | | Sindangan | Zamboanga del Norte | Prince Hypermart | |

== Shopping malls under construction ==
=== Luzon ===
| Name | City/municipality | Province | Remarks |
|---|---|---|---|
| Robinsons Bulacan Town Center | Malolos City | Bulacan | Under Construction |
| SM City General Trias | General Trias City | Cavite | Under Construction |
| Waltermart Paliparan | Dasmariñas | Cavite | Under Construction |
| SM Nuvali | Santa Rosa | Laguna | Under Construction |
| Waltermart Imus Lancaster | Imus | Cavite | Under Construction |
| Power Plant Mall Angeles | Angeles | Pampanga | Under Construction |
| Xentro Mall Puerto Galera | Puerto Galera | Oriental Mindoro | Under Construction |
| SM City Malolos | Malolos | Bulacan | Proposed |
| SM City Carmona | Carmona | Cavite | Proposed |
| LCC Mall Daet | Daet | Camarines Norte | Fenced |
| Maple Grove Mall | General Trias City | Cavite | Fenced |
| SM City Molino 2 | Bacoor | Cavite | Fenced |
| SM City Goa | Goa | Camarines Sur | Fenced |
| SM Center Iriga | Iriga | Camarines Sur | Fenced |
| SM Center Tabaco | Tabaco | Albay | Fenced |
| Robinsons Bacoor | Bacoor | Cavite | Fenced |
| LCC Mall Dasmariñas | Dasmariñas | Cavite | Fenced |
| Waltermart Pili | Pili | Camarines Sur | Fenced |

=== Visayas ===
| Name | City/municipality | Province | Remarks |
|---|---|---|---|
| Ayala Malls Gatewalk | Mandaue | Cebu | Expected completion in the 4th Quarter of 2026 |
| SM City Tagbilaran | Tagbilaran City | Bohol | Under Construction |
| Robinsons Mandaue | Mandaue | Cebu | Fenced |
| SM City Lapu-Lapu | Lapu-Lapu City | Cebu | Fenced |

=== Mindanao ===
| Name | City/municipality | Province | Remarks |
|---|---|---|---|
| KCC Mall of Iligan | Iligan City | Lanao del Norte | |
| Veranza Cotabato | Cotabato City | Maguindanao del Norte | Beside KCC Cotabato, Quezon Avenue corner Parang Road Cotabato City |
| GO Strip | Zamboanga City | Zamboanga del Sur | A 4-story strip mall which is set to be the city's 2nd strip mall after L' Arcada Complex. |
| Ororama Supercenter Puerto | Cagayan de Oro | Misamis Oriental | |
| SR Gigamall | Zamboanga City | Zamboanga del Sur | Located in the 100-hectare township in Pasobolong, Boalan masterplanned by SR Land Development Corporation. A 4-story mall set to become the largest mall in the region approximately larger than KCC Mall De Zamboanga with an estimated GFA of 180,000 sqm. |
| Gaisano Grand Mall Dipolog | Dipolog City | Zamboanga del Norte | First Gaisano Grand mall in Zamboanga del Norte. |
| SM City Tagum | Tagum | Davao del Norte | First SM Mall in Davao del Norte |
| Puregold Sindangan | Sindangan | Zamboanga del Norte | First Puregold Branch in Zamboanga Peninsula |
| SM City Iligan | Iligan City | Lanao del Norte | First SM Mall in Lanao del Norte |
| SM City Surigao | Surigao City | Surigao Del Norte | Fenced |
| SM City Dipolog | Dipolog City | Zamboanga del Norte | Fenced |
| KCC Mall of Cagayan de Oro | Cagayan de Oro City | Misamis Oriental | Fenced |
| KCC Mall of Butuan | Butuan | Agusan del Norte | Fenced |
| Robinsons Cybergate Zamboanga | Zamboanga City | Zamboanga del Sur | Fenced |

== Defunct ==
| Name | City/municipality | Province | Type | Developer | Year closed | Remarks |
|---|---|---|---|---|---|---|
| Alta Mall | Zamboanga City | Zamboanga del Sur | Community mall | | 1996 | |
| Brickstone Mall | Tuguegarao | Cagayan | Community mall | | 2023 | |
| Kimball Plaza | General Santos | South Cotabato | Community mall | | 2002 | Closed in 2002 after a bombing and subsequent fire. |
| NCCC Mall VP (formerly Victoria Plaza Mall) | Davao City | Davao del Sur | Community mall | Davao Sunrise Investment & Development Corp. (1992-2019); New City Commercial Corporation (2019–2025) | 2025 | First shopping mall in Davao City. In March 2019, NCCC acquired Victoria Plaza and renamed to NCCC Mall VP. |
| Ocean Palace Mall | Lucena | Quezon | Community mall | | 2004 | Converted into Novo and Meaco Royal Hotel. |
| Olongapo City Mall | Olongapo | Zambales | Community mall | | 2010 | Acquired by SM Prime Holdings and demolished to make way for SM City Olongapo Downtown (formerly SM City Olongapo). |
| Walter Mart Calamba | Calamba | Laguna | Community mall | WM Property Management Inc. | 2021 | Acquired by SM Prime Holdings and planned as an expansion of SM City Calamba. |

== Philippine mall chains ==
Shopping malls play an important role in the Philippine economy. Major Philippine mall chains are located around the country, such as SM Supermalls, which has 90 malls (as of November 2026) around the country. Another major mall chain is Ayala Malls, which has 46 shopping malls (as of December 2025) serving nationwide. The Philippines has also other major mall chains such as Robinsons Malls, which has 63 shopping malls (as of December 2025), Megaworld Lifestyle Malls, Vista Malls, Walter Mart, Gaisano Malls, NCCC Malls, KCC Malls, Ever Gotesco Malls, Isetann and many more.

== Gallery ==
Trinoma

SM Seaside City

Power Plant Mall

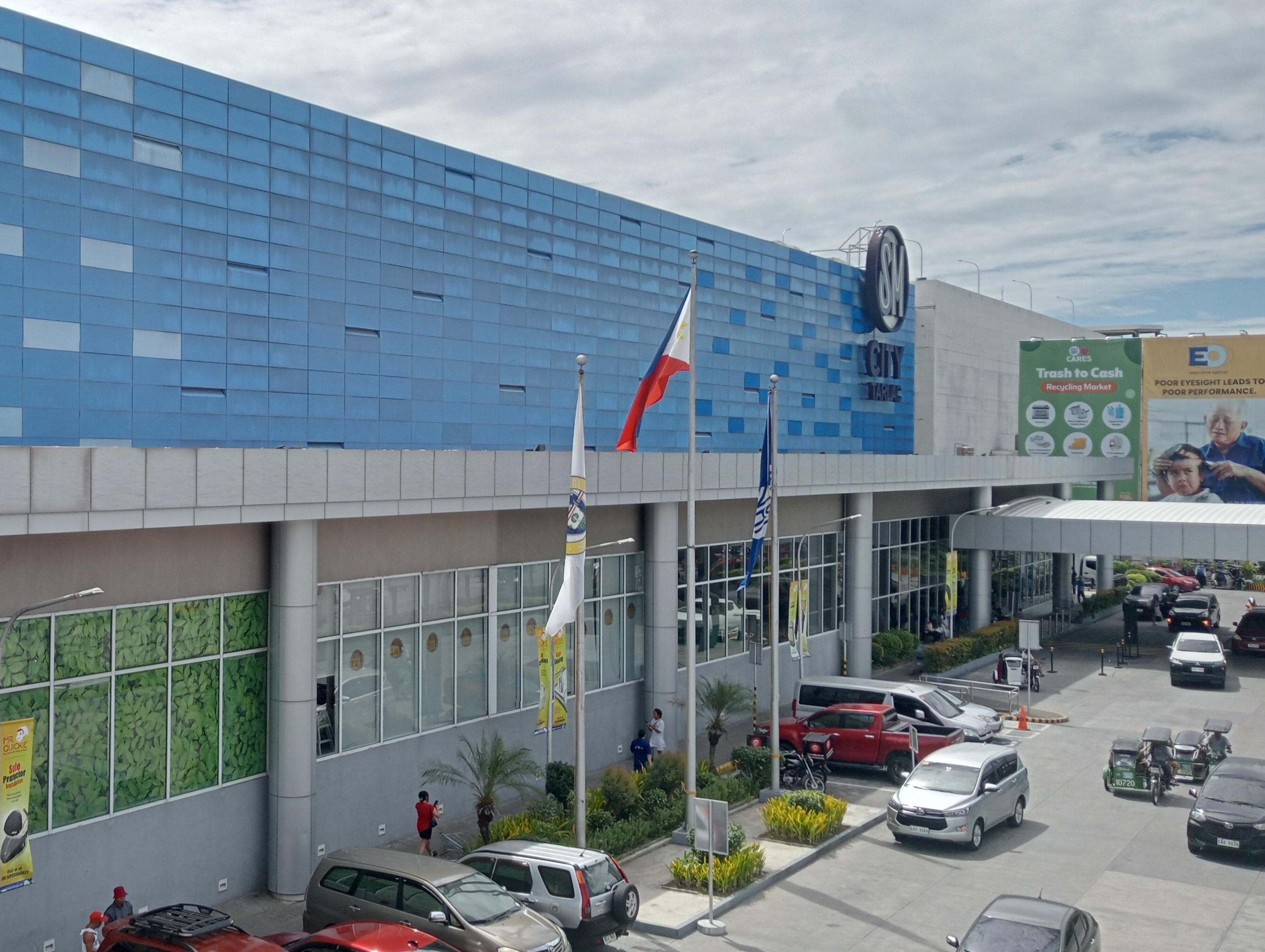
SM City Tarlac

SM City Fairview

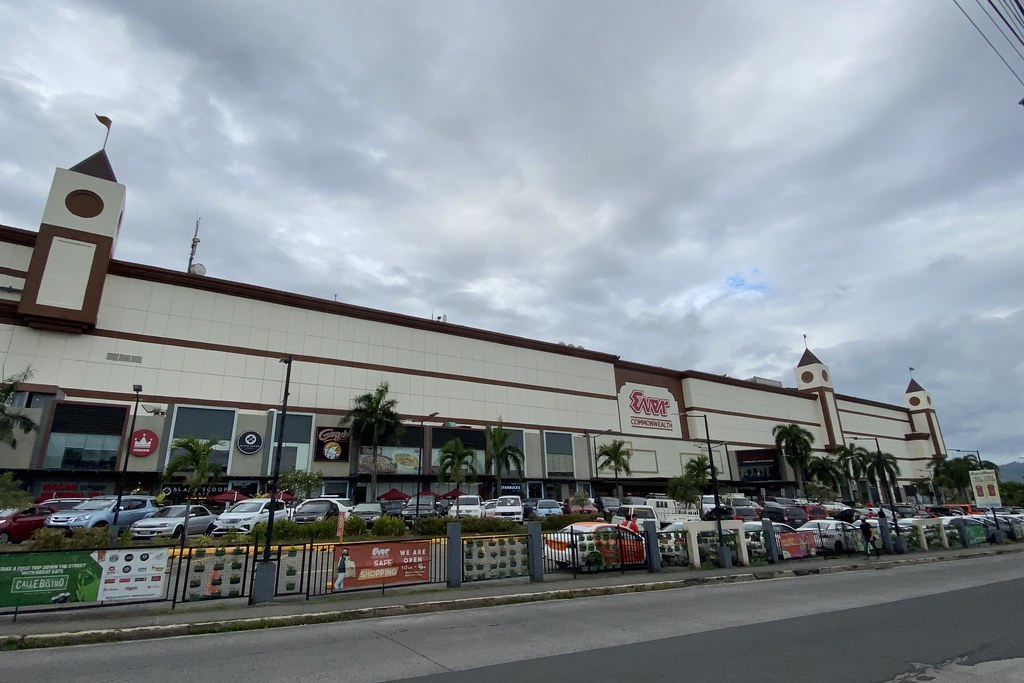
Ever Gotesco Commonwealth

SM Lanang Premier

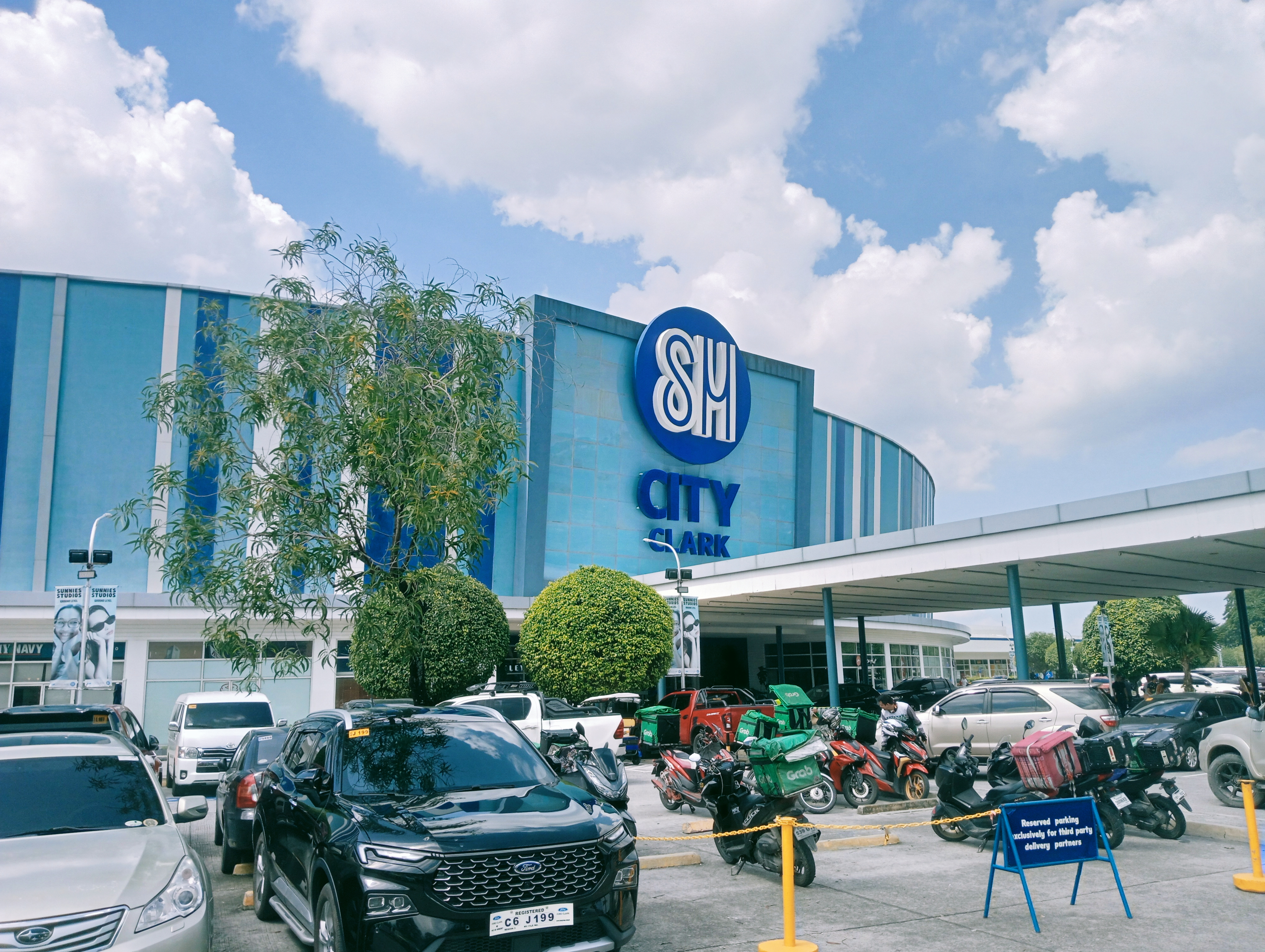
SM City Clark

Gateway Mall

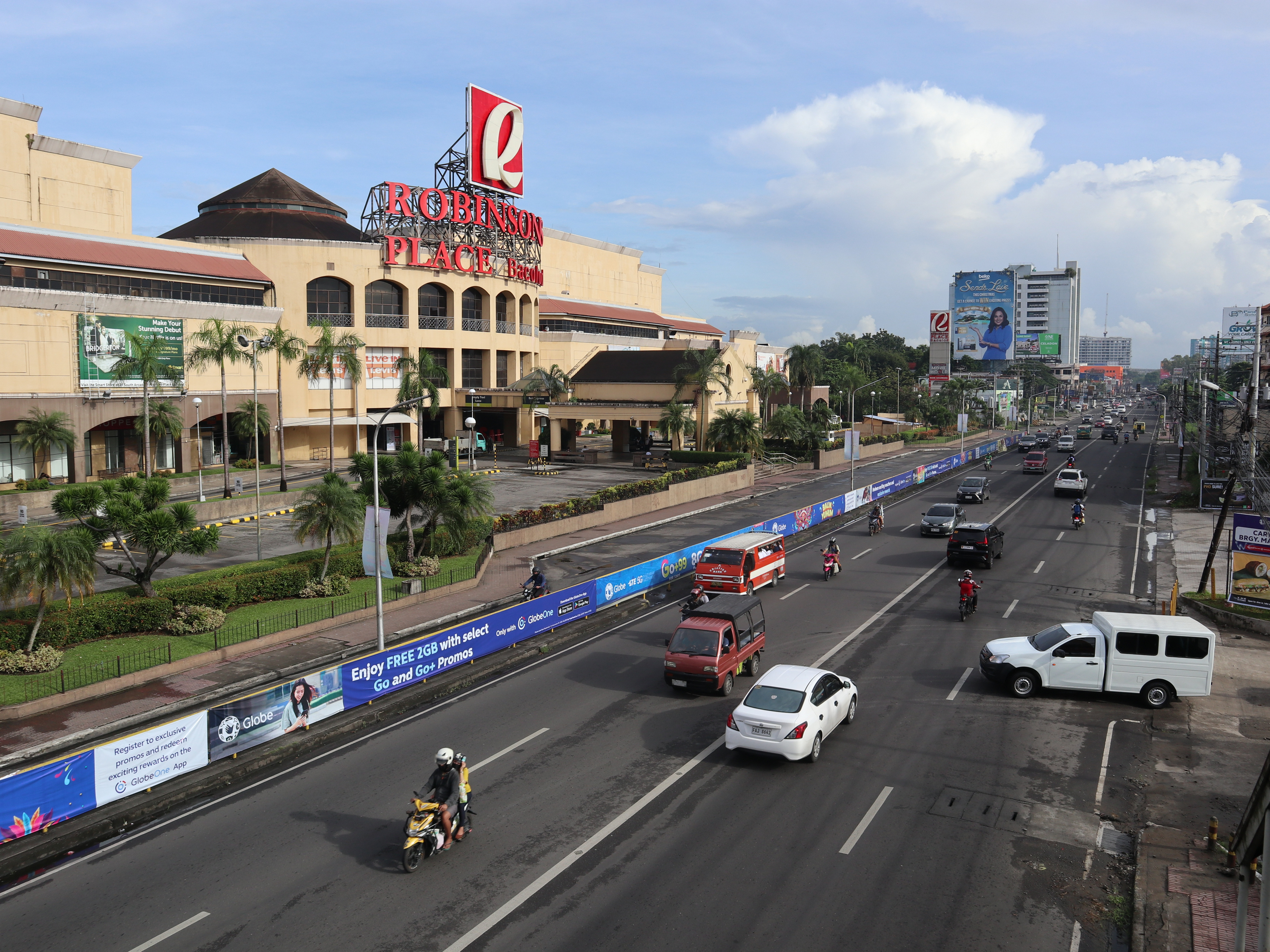
Robinsons Bacolod

Robinsons Angeles

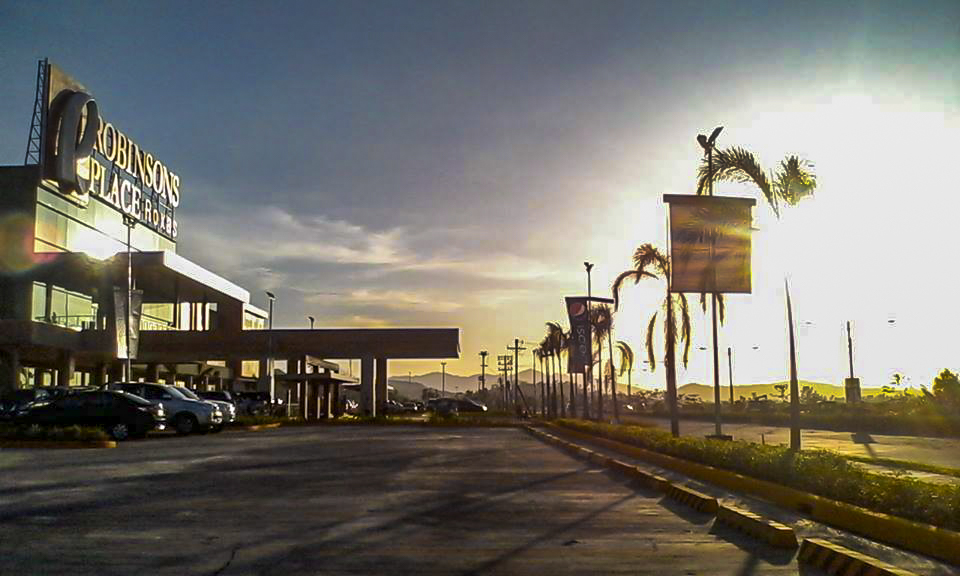
Robinsons Roxas

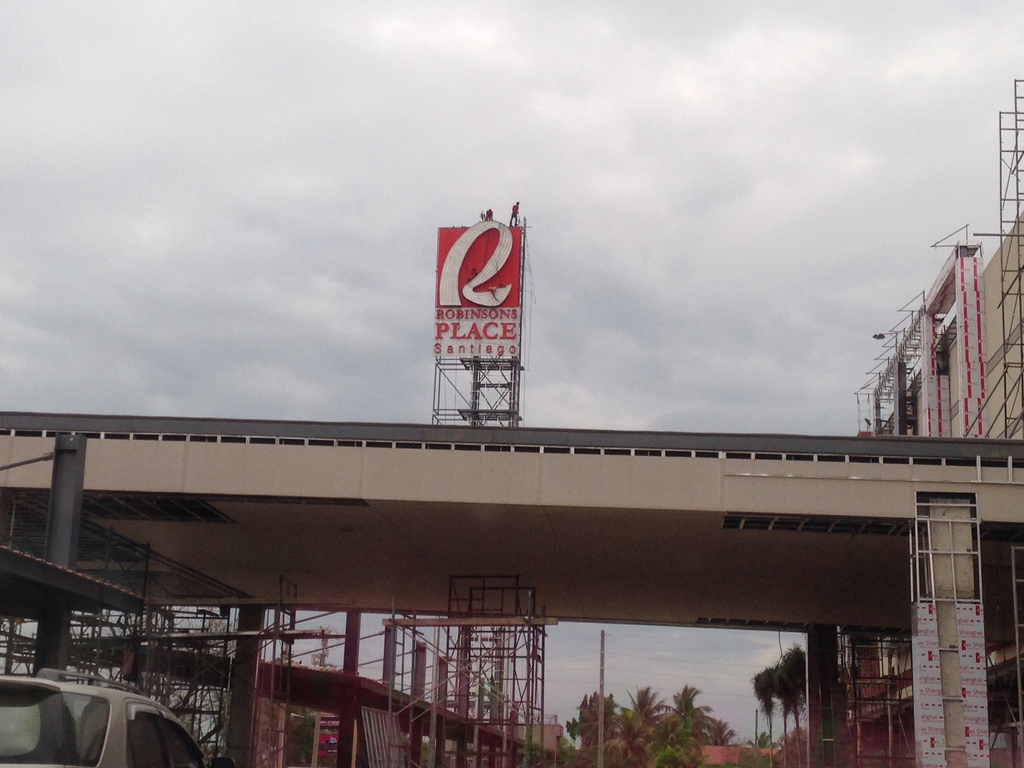
Robinsons Santiago

SM City Iloilo

Marquee Mall

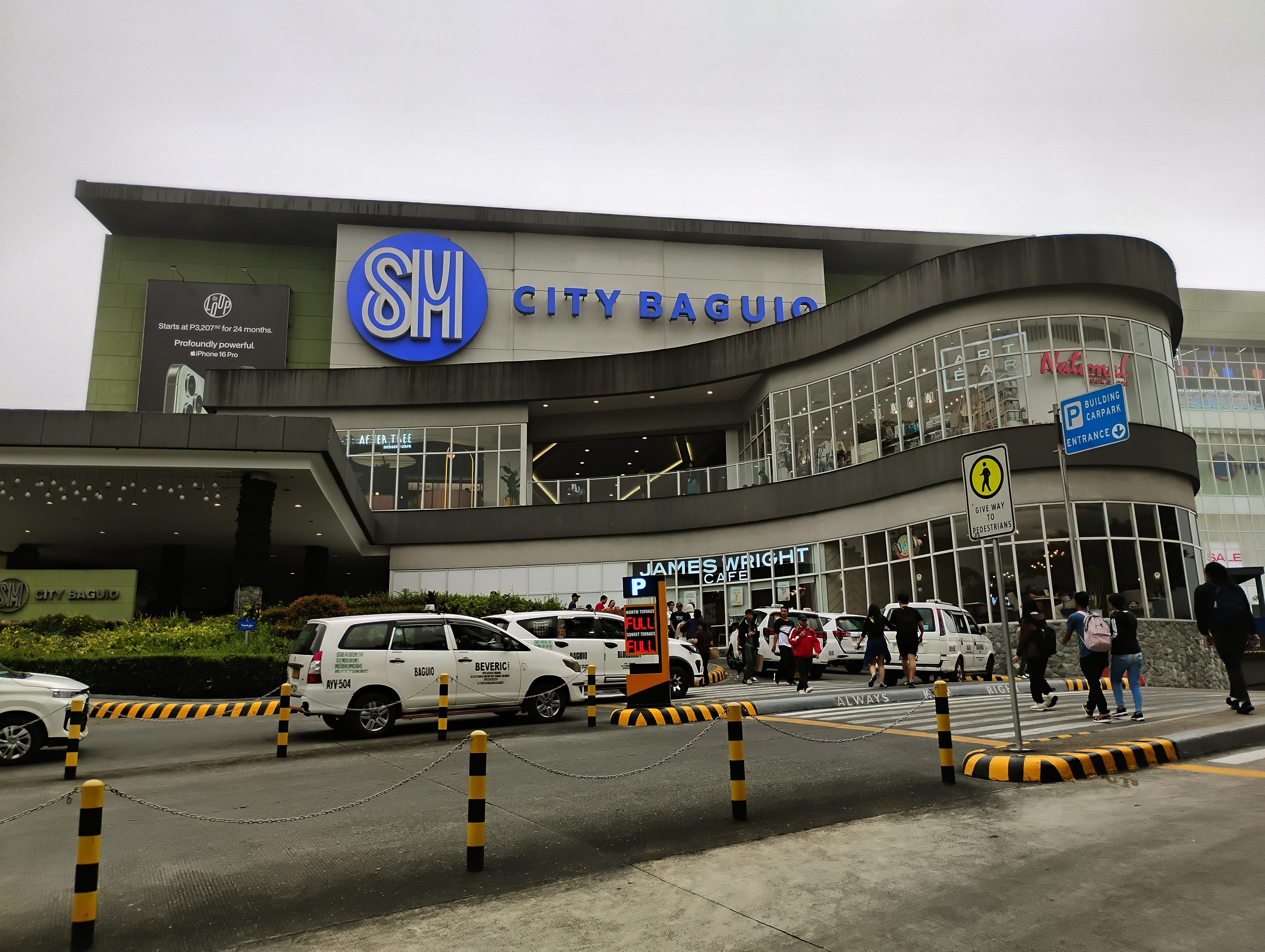
SM City Baguio

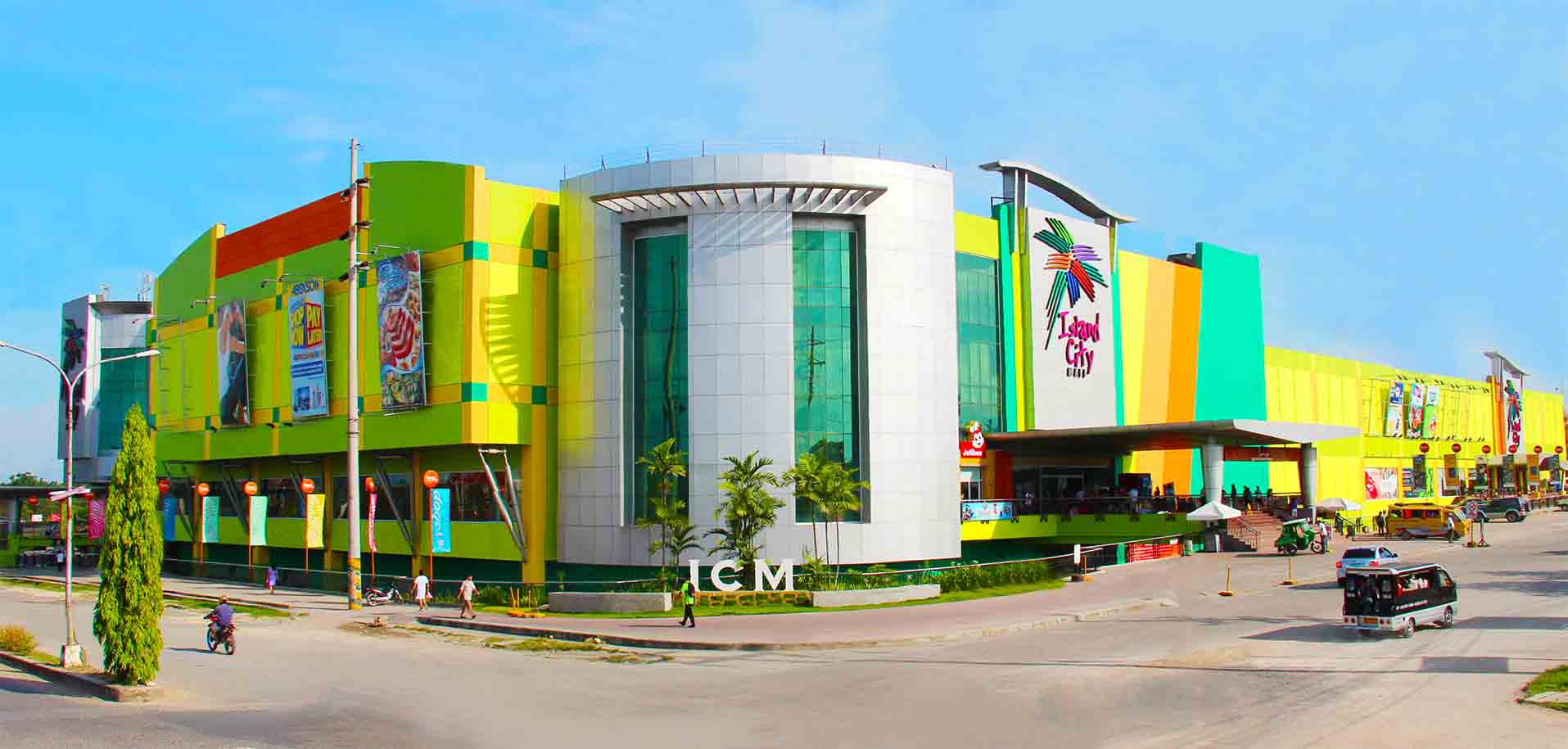
Island CityMall in Tagbilaran

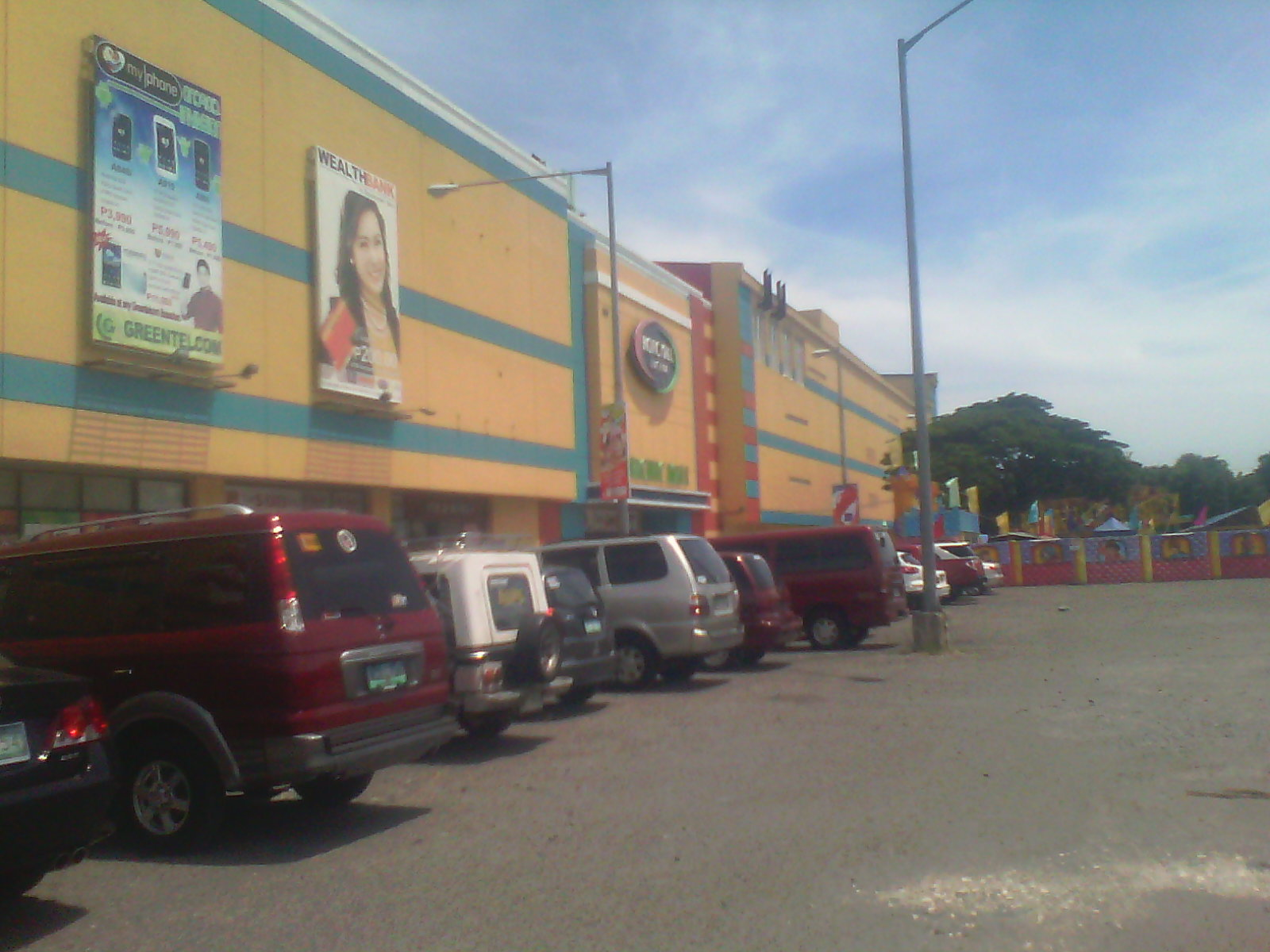
Pacific Mall Lucena

SM City Calamba

== See also ==
- List of largest shopping malls in the Philippines
