= NCCC Malls =

Philippines retail company

- Type: Shopping malls
- Founded: 1978; 48 years ago
- Founder: Lim Tian Siu
- Headquarters: Davao City, Philippines
- Number of locations: 6 Malls
- Area served: Davao City; Puerto Princesa City; Tagum City
- Key people: Sharlene Faye A. Lim (President); Althea D. Lucas (Vice-President)
- Website: https://nccc.com.ph/business-unit/nccc-malls/

New City Commercial Corporation Malls or NCCC Malls, commonly known as just NCCC are shopping malls owned by the New City Commercial Corporation (NCCC) Group. The company is founded and is based in Davao City, Philippines.

== History ==
NCCC began as a textile store in Davao City during the 1950s by Lim Tian Siu. The store eventually evolved into a general merchandise store selling basic necessities and other items like shoes and jewelry.

In 1978, the family opened the first NCCC Supermarket and Department Store at Ramon Magsaysay Avenue and named it New City Commercial Center.

By 1987, NCCC opened its Tagum City branch.

Then in 1991, NCCC opened its first mall in Puerto Princesa City, Palawan. This was also the first mall in the island and in outside of Mindanao.

In 1999, the company expanded its branch in Tagum City with the opening of NCCC Mall Tagum.

In 2019, NCCC was able to acquire the first mall in Davao City, the Victoria Plaza, which started operations in 1993 until its closure on 2025.

Within 30 years NCCC has become a conglomerate. It has diversified into department stores with their NCCC Department Stores, breads and pastries with Breadfactory, health products and pharmacies with HB1, hardware and home fixtures with Hardwaremaxx, and movies and theater NCCC Cinemas.

== Fire incidents ==
=== 2013 NCCC Mall Palawan fire ===
In 2013, a 6-hour fire ravaged the topmost floor of the building that served as the department store’s main storage area in NCCC Mall Palawan.

== Branches ==
Branches under construction
Name	Location	Opening year	Closed	Reopening year	Image	Note
NCCC Mall Maa	Matina, Davao City	2003	2017	2026		Formerly known as NCCC Mall Davao prior to the 2017 Davao mall fire. Burned down to the ground on December 23, 2017. Under rebuilding and reconstruction since July 2021. As of 2025, only the grocery store is open in the mall following its reopening in December 2024.

Current branches
Name	Location	Opening year	Image	Note
NCCC Main Magsaysay (NCCC Uyanguren)	R. Magsaysay Avenue, Davao City	1978		
NCCC Mall Tagum	Km.55, National Highway, Brgy. Magugpo East, Tagum City	1999		
NCCC Mall Palawan	#89 Lacao St., Brgy. Maningning, Puerto Princesa City	1991		
NCCC Mall Buhangin	Km.7, Tigatto Road, Brgy. Buhangin, Davao City	2018		

Other branches
Name	Location	Opening date	Image	Note
NCCC Centerpoint	Matina Pangi, Davao City	1995		
NCCC Panacan	Km.13, National Highway, Panacan, Davao City.			
NCCC Mati City				
NCCC Lupon				

Former branches
Name	Location	Opening year	Closing year	Image	Note
NCCC Mall VP (Victoria Plaza)	J.P. Laurel Avenue Bajada, J.P. Laurel Ave, Davao City	1993 (as Victoria Plaza); 2019 (as NCCC Mall VP)	2025		Permanently closed on December 31, 2025 and set to be demolished sometime in 2026 due to property purchase of Robinsons Land Corporation from NCCC.
