= Robinsons Tuguegarao =

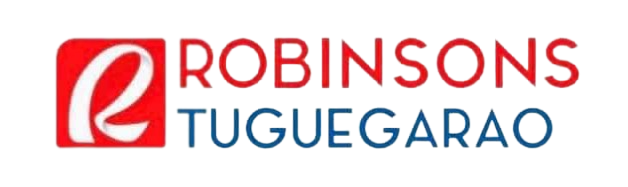

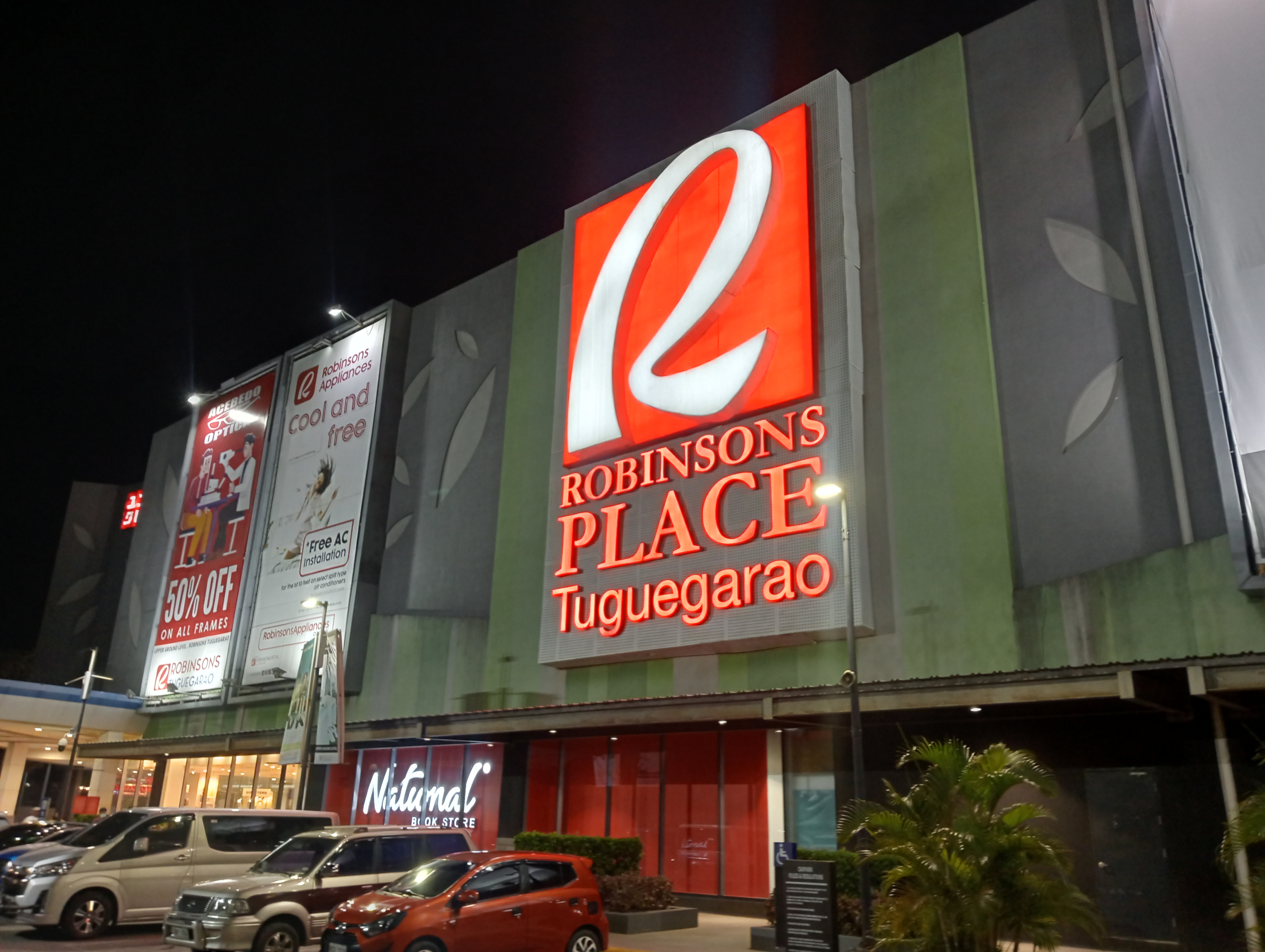
- The facade as Robinsons Place Tuguegarao in 2024.
- Location: Tuguegarao, Cagayan, Philippines
- Coordinates: 17°37′42.04″N 121°43′57.78″E
- Address: Maharlika Highway, Barangay Tanza
- Opened: July 26, 2018; 8 years ago
- Developer: JG Summit Holdings
- Manager: Robinsons Land Corporation
- Owner: John Gokongwei
- Architect: ASYA Design
- Num. of stores: 250+
- Num. of anchor tenants: 7
- Floor area: 68,000 m^{2} (730,000 sq ft)
- Floors: Main Mall: 3; Go Hotel: 3
- Parking: 500 slots
- Website: www.robinsonsmalls.com

Robinsons Tuguegarao (formerly known as Robinsons Place Tuguegarao), is a mixed-use complex shopping mall, owned and operated by Robinsons Land Corporation (RLC), one of the largest mall operators in the Philippines. It is located at the boundary of barangays Leonarda and Tanza, along Maharlika Highway, Tuguegarao City, Cagayan. Its location gives high accessibility to northern municipalities of Cagayan and the Tuguegarao Airport.

The mall opened its doors to the public on July 26, 2018 as the first full-service mall in Cagayan, the second Robinsons mall in the Cagayan Valley Region, after Robinsons Place Santiago, and the 50th in the Philippines. With a gross floor area of 68,000 m^{2} (730,000 sq ft), it is the second largest mall in the region.

The complex includes a Go Hotels Plus branch, the first in the region, a budget hotel brand also owned and operated by RLC.

== Design ==
Known as the corporation's golden mall, the design of the mall is patterned over rice, where Cagayan is known for. Predominant in the mall are patterns of rice grains which are seen in parts of the interior. Jagged and sloping volumes on the façade is an ode to the Sierra Madre and Cordillera mountain ranges. Inspired by the city's captivating sunrises, the main atrium features sun rays that "rise over the rice fields."

The food court is in green and orange colors, and the cinema lobby is draped in violet and blue.

== Features ==
The three-level mall features anchor stores such as Robinsons Department Store, which is spread across two levels; Robinsons Appliances; Daiso Japan; Handyman; Robinsons Supermarket, located at the basement, and; Robinsons Movieworld, with six cinemas including a 3D theater. It also has amusement centers for children and two activity areas spanning 1,300 m^{2} (14,000 sq ft) to be used for special gatherings and conventions.

Aside from the affiliate brands, RLC also brought in popular local and international retailers and restaurants. The list include Guess, Mango, Vans, Levi's, Bench, Penshoppe, Bayo, Plains & Prints, Burger King, Bon Chon, Hap Chan Shabu Shabu, Seafood Island, Pepper Lunch, among others.

Japanese global retail giant Uniqlo also opened its very first store in Cagayan Valley at the mall. The new store brings with it 818-square meter of new shopping space.

It also features the Lingkod Pinoy Center, a one-stop facility for government institutions, which house the Department of Foreign Affairs consular office of the region. Full service SSS and Pag-ibig offices would also open soon.

The complex includes Go Hotels equipped with 136 rooms.

ASYA Design, an award-winning Philippine-based architectural firm, designed the mall.

== Gallery ==
Robinsons Tuguegarao Drop Off

Robinsons Department Store

Robinsons Amusement Center

Hallway

2nd Level

Food Gallery

== See also ==
- SM Center Tuguegarao Downtown
- Robinsons Santiago

Preceded by Robinsons Place Pavia	50th Robinsons Mall; 2018	Succeeded by Robinsons Place Valencia
