= NCCC Mall VP =

Shopping mall in Davao City, Philippines

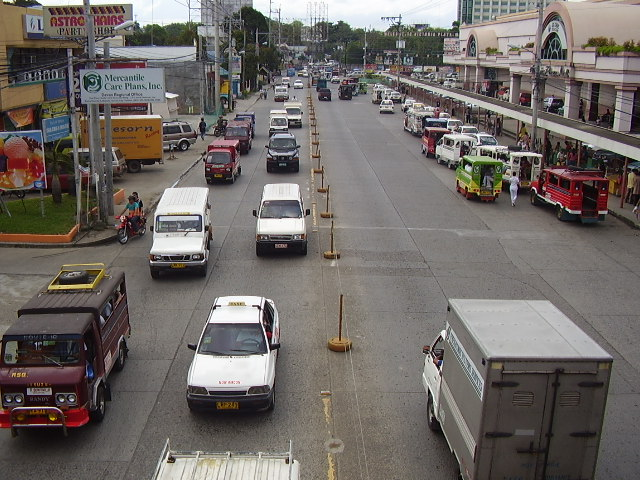
- Victoria Plaza at the right-side corner in July 2006
- Location: J.P. Laurel Avenue Bajada, J.P. Laurel Ave, Davao City, Philippines
- Coordinates: 7°05′12″N 125°36′42″E
- Opened: March 16, 1993; 33 years ago
- Closed: December 31, 2025; 10 months ago
- Previous names: Victoria Plaza (1993–2019)
- Owner: NCCC Malls
- Floor area: 81,000
- Floors: 2 + 1 extra floor in the department store
- Public transit: Buhangin via JP Laurel Catitipan via JP Laurel Landmark 3 Cabantian Country Homes Emily Homes Juliville Tigatto Communal Mandug; Sasa via JP Laurel Doña Pilar-Roxas Ave.; Obrero; Panacan via JP Laurel Panacan-SM City Panacan-Ilustre; Tibungco-Roxas Ave. Bunawan-Roxas Ave. Lasang-Roxas Ave.; Route 4 Route 10; Future: M3 NCCC Mall VP
- Website: https://nccc.com.ph/business-unit/nccc-malls/

NCCC Mall VP, formerly known as Victoria Plaza, was a shopping mall in Davao City. The first shopping mall in the city, it opened on March 16, 1993 and closed on December 31, 2025. NCCC Malls acquired the mall and its complex on March 12, 2019, renaming and rebranding it to NCCC Mall VP. The place occupied a gross land area of 81,000 square meters.

Before its acquisition, it was the oldest mall in Davao region and was also the first mall in Davao City and the second in all of Mindanao after Limketkai Center in Cagayan de Oro, which opened in 1991.

== History ==
The original Victoria Plaza was built in the early 1990s by the late businessman Robert Alan L. Limso through his Davao Sunrise Investment and Development Corp. The three-storey Victoria Plaza became a local icon as the city's first shopping mall.

Limso, known to be close to some politicians in the city, including former President Rodrigo Duterte, as he served as a city councilor from 1981 until his resignation in 1986 after the transitory government of President Corazon C. Aquino, mortgaged the mall to the Philippine National Bank, which eventually repossessed the mall after Limso's failure to pay and the mall's decline.

In 2019, New City Commercial Corporation (NCCC), a local retail pioneer, acquired the historic mall. The acquisition was sealed in a signing ceremony on March 12 with PNB at the PNB Financial Center in Manila.

It ceased operations on December 31, 2025, with the mall set to be demolished sometime in 2026 after tenants will begin dismantling stalls and salvaging materials in March 2026.

== Future development ==
NCCC presented a five-phase development of the 9.6-hectare property, where the mall currently stands. The area is planned to a be mixed-use development with eight high-rise condominiums, serviced apartments, retail strips, lush green space, and a five-star hotel. The development is expected to run from seven to 10 years and the last phase of the development will involve the reconstruction of the original mall.

However, in late 2025, it was announced that Robinsons Land Corporation has purchased the property from NCCC. It has been eyed for redevelopment for new business projects, including an office building, as part of its expansion alongside its properties inside the neighboring Abreeza estate.
