= Robinsons Ormoc =

- Location: Ormoc, Leyte, Philippines
- Coordinates: 11.025996°N 124.604611°E
- Address: Palo-Carigara-Ormoc Rd, Brgy. Cogon
- Opened: April 19, 2018; 8 years ago
- Developer: JG Summit Holdings
- Manager: Robinsons Land Corporation
- Num. of stores: 110
- Floors: 3
- Website: robinsonsmalls.com/mall-info/robinsons-place-ormoc

Robinsons Ormoc (formerly known as Robinsons Place Ormoc) is a shopping mall in Ormoc City, It is located along the Palo-Carigara-Ormoc Rd, Brgy. Cogon, Ormoc.

== Overview ==
Robinsons Ormoc has a Robinsons Department Store, which is the company's 50th, a Robinsons Supermarket, which is the company's 155th, a Cinema, and other stores.
