= Prince Hypermart =

Retail store chain in the Philippines

- Trade name: Prince Warehouse Club, Inc.
- Company type: Private
- Industry: Retail
- Founded: April 1990; 36 years ago
- Headquarters: Cebu City, Cebu, Philippines
- Number of locations: 65 (as of October 2023)
- Area served: Philippines
- Key people: Robert L. Go (President)
- Parent: Prince Retail Group of Companies
- Website: www.princeretail.com

Prince Hypermart is a retail store chain in the Philippines with branches in Luzon, Visayas and Mindanao. It is owned by Robert L. Go, the President of the Philippine Retailers Association.

== History ==
Prince Warehouse Club Incorporated started in April 1990 with Robert L. Go as its chairman. Their first branch is at North Reclamation Area (today's Prince Wholesale Center NRA) when they converted a plain warehouse into a store with a single cash register. Initially they sold glassware, kitchenware, plastic ware and other household items.

It expanded in 1993 with their second branch in A.C. Cortes, Mandaue City as Prince Hypermart Mandaue. Currently, Prince Hypermart Mandaue is managed by Prince Mandaue Chain of Stores (Prince Warehouse Club Mandaue Inc.) and separated from the Prince Warehouse Club Inc. Robert's brother is Prince Mandaue's managing supervisor.

Prince later initiated programs to help the sari-sari store owners with their Prince Warehouse Club's Sari-Sari Store Society (SSS). The program became a tool for Prince to help sari-sari store owners to grow their business and can buy goods at Prince Hypermart with discounts and perks.

Their operations in Cebu soon expanded to nearby towns and provinces within Visayas Region. Like their giant rival Gaisano, they expanded outside Cebu when they knew that Cebu is becoming "saturated" with a lot of their stores in the province.

In 2013, Prince expanded their operations in Mindanao with its first branch in Oroquieta, Misamis Occidental. Their operations in Mindanao soon expanded in Zamboanga del Norte, Agusan del Sur, Agusan del Norte, Surigao del Sur, Surigao del Norte and Misamis Occidental. At that same year, they had 24 stores with 500,000 customers served every day. They also introduce ECPay, an electronic payment to their branches nationwide.

The company continued to expand in more provinces, even reaching Luzon. In addition to the expansion, Kapatagan, Lanao del Norte branch was opened on October 7, 2018.

Their expansion over Visayas and Mindanao as of 2019 took PhP 1B+ investment. They closed the year with a total of 58 branches nationwide.

== See also ==
- CityMall
- Primark Town Center
- Puregold
- SM Retail
