= Galleria Zamboanga =

Galleria Zamboanga, Inc. is a major retail company based in Zamboanga City, Philippines. The company took its name from the defunct shopping arcade where Southway Square presently stands. Their businesses include supermarket, retail, and food.

== Stores under Galleria Zamboanga ==
Name	Address	Opened	Store type
Mega Shop-O-Rama	Gov. Lim Avenue, Zamboanga City	1976	Department store, supermarket
Southway Square	Gov. Lim Avenue cor. PO. Lorenzo St., Zamboanga City	2007	Mall

=== Mega Shop-O-Rama ===
Mega Shop-O-Rama is among the pioneering shopping centers located in downtown Zamboanga in 1976. Located at Gov. Lim Avenue, the shopping center includes a supermarket (ground floor, main building), bookstore and school supplies (extension building), men's fashion (extension building), women's fashion (second floor, extension building), health and beauty (second floor main building), textiles (third floor, main building), children's and toys (2nd floor, extension building) and hobbies (3rd floor extension building). It also includes food stalls owned by the company at the supermarket and at the bridgeway (2nd and 3rd floors) connecting the main building and the extension building.

=== Southway Square ===
Southway Square is Galleria Zamboanga, Inc.'s mall venture. The five-story building is located at the former Galleria Zamboanga. This is also the first mall in Zamboanga to feature an underground car-park. It includes a food court exclusively operated by Jollibee Foods, Inc., the first Mang Inasal branch, a Food Paradise stall at the third floor, a World of Fun amusement center, a supermarket and a department store, plus more than 20 shops and stalls. It is also a venue for major events such as concert tours, talent shows and raffle promos.

=== Food Paradise ===
Food Paradise is a foodcourt-cum-restaurant located at Mayor Climaco Avenue. It boasts a wide array of dishes, snacks and breads having placed in organized areas. Another branch of Food Paradise (called Food Paradise Hot Skillet) at La Purisima Street has also offered unique dishes such as paella, spaghetti, and chop suey.

== Prime DDG Commercial Centers, Inc. ==
Prime DDG Commercial Centers, Inc. is a joint venture between Double Dragon Properties, Inc. and Galleria Zamboanga, Inc. to construct two CityMalls in Zamboanga City. CityMall is a partnership between Double Dragon (jointly owned by known two businessmen from the country's largest fast food chain group Jollibee Foods Corporation) and SM Investments Corporation will construct two branches in Tetuan and Guiwan. 70% of the joint venture will be for Double Dragon for the retail while the remaining 30% percent will be given to Galleria Zamboanga, which Shop-O-Rama Hypermarket will be the main supermarket anchor. Ace Hardware, SM Appliance Center, Watsons, Banco de Oro will be SM tenants at these CityMalls while fast-food chains owned by Jollibee Foods Corporation will anchor its foodcourt. Their first mall in Tetuan made a grand opening on September 30, 2015.

=== CityMalls in Zamboanga ===
Name	Address	Opened	Store type
CityMall Tetuan, Zamboanga	Don Alfaro St., Tetuan, Zamboanga City	September 30, 2015	Community mall
CityMall Guiwan, Zamboanga	Maria Clara L. Lobregat Highway, Guiwan, Zamboanga City	TBA	Community mall
