= NCCC Mall Tagum =

Shopping mall in Davao del Norte, Philippines

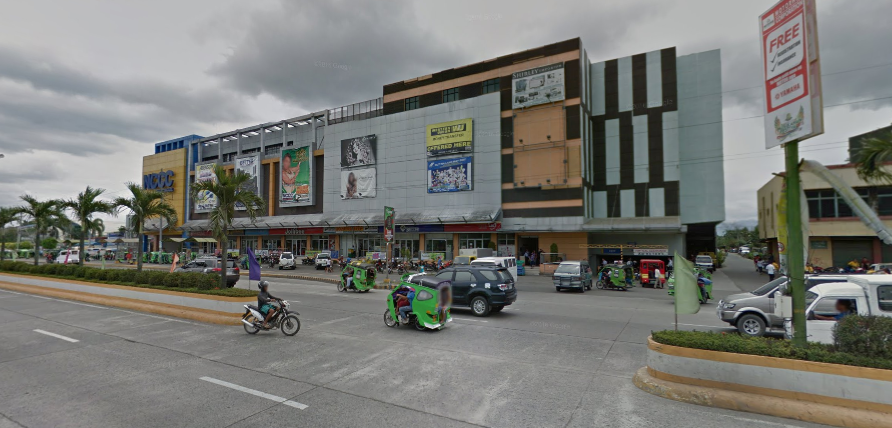
- NCCC Mall Tagum in 2017
- Location: Tagum City, Davao Del Norte, Philippines
- Coordinates: 7°27′05″N 125°48′51″E
- Address: Km. 55, National Highway
- Opened: 1999; 27 years ago
- Developer: New City Commercial Corporation Group
- Owner: New City Commercial Corporation Group
- Num. of stores: more than 100 shops and restaurants
- Num. of anchor tenants: 6
- Floors: 4 floors
- Website: nccc.com.ph

NCCC Mall Tagum is the second mall built by NCCC Group and the oldest mall located in Tagum City in the Philippines. The mall opened in 1999. The mall also caters to neighboring towns of Tagum City.

== Incidents ==
On January 16, 2016, an incident occurred; a group of 9 people attempted to rob two jewelry shops within the mall.

== See also ==
- Gaisano
