= Robinsons Santiago =

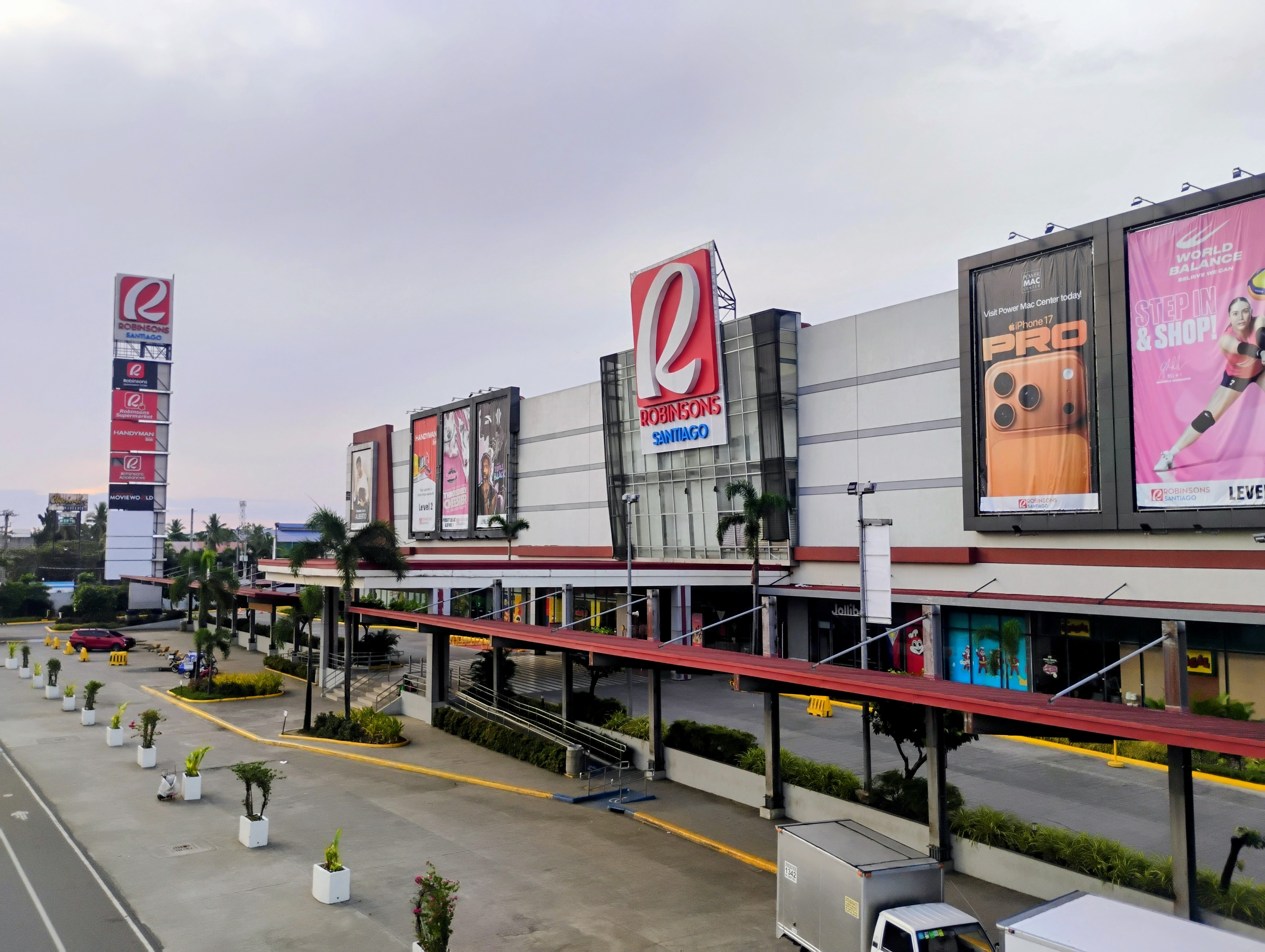
- Robinsons Santiago in 2026
- Location: Santiago, Isabela, Philippines
- Coordinates: 16°41′46″N 121°33′40″E
- Address: Pan-Philippine Highway, Barangay Mabini
- Opened: February 19, 2014; 12 years ago
- Developer: JG Summit Holdings
- Manager: Robinsons Land
- Owner: John Gokongwei
- Num. of stores: Over 200 shops and restaurants
- Num. of anchor tenants: 7
- Floor area: 39,800 m^{2} (428,000 ft^{2})
- Floors: 3
- Parking: 450
- Website: robinsonsmalls.com/malls_santiago.php

Robinsons Santiago (formerly known as Robinsons Place Santiago), is a shopping mall owned and operated by Robinsons Malls, the second largest mall operator in the Philippines. The mall opened on the February 19, 2014. It is the 36th of Robinsons Land Corporation and the first full service mall in Cagayan Valley.

Robinsons Santiago is located along Pan-Philippine Highway, Barangay Mabini, Santiago City, Isabela. Robinsons Santiago serves at least 1 million residents which covers towns in the province of Quirino, Nueva Vizcaya and southern Isabela.

An important feature of the mall is the Lingkod Pinoy Center, a cluster of offices operated by government institutions. The Lingkod Pinoy Center of Robinsons Place Santiago provides services for GSIS, PhilHealth, Pag-Ibig Fund, SSS, PHLPost, TESDA and most notably, a Department of Foreign Affairs passport office which opened in May 2018. The DFA office accepts applications for new passports as well as renewals.

== Gallery ==
Robinsons Santiago's signage as of January 25, 2014

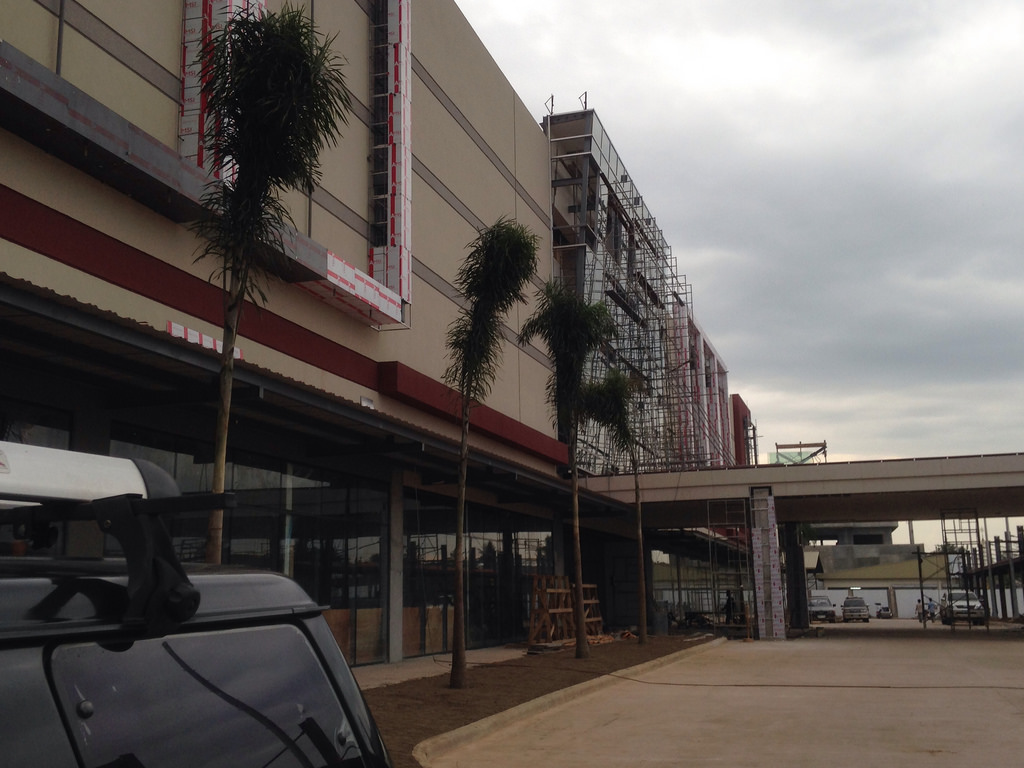
Robinsons Santiago's facade (West Wing) in 2014
