= List of supermarket chains in the Philippines =

This is a list of supermarket chains in the Philippines.

== Supermarkets in the Philippines ==
- All Day Supermarket
- Chain Mart
  - Cash & Carry
  - Makati Supermarket Alabang
  - Unimart
- Citimart
- City Supermarket, Inc.
- Dali Everyday Grocery
- Ever Supermarket
- Fisher Supermarket
- Gaisano Capital
- Gaisano G Market (Gaisano Supermarket under DSG Sons Group; not to be confused with G-Market in South Korea)
- Gaisano Grand Supermarket
- Marks & Spencer
- Metro Retail Stores Group (formerly Metro Gaisano; not to be confused with Metro Cash & Carry in Germany)
  - Super Metro Gaisano
- Hi-Top Supermarket
- Iloilo Society Commercial, Inc.
- Iloilo Supermart
- Injap Supermart (MerryMart Grocery Centers Inc.)
- Isetann
- KCC Supermarket
- The Landmark Supermarket
- LCC Supermarket
- Lopue's
- NCCC Supermarket
- NE Supermarket
- Prince Hypermart
- Puregold Price Club, Inc.
  - Puregold
  - Minimart by Puregold
  - Puregold Price Club
  - Parco Supermarket
  - S&R Membership Shopping
  - Merkado Supermarket (joint venture with Ayala Land)
  - Budgetlane
- RCS Supermartket
- Robinsons Retail Holdings, Inc.
  - Robinsons Supermarket
  - Robinsons Easymart
  - Jaynith's Supermarket
  - The Marketplace (formerly Rustan's Supermarket and Robinsons Selections)
  - Wellcome
  - Shopwise
  - O!Save
  - No Brand Philippines
- SM Markets (a division of SM Retail)
  - SM Supermarket
  - Savemore Market
  - SM Hypermarket
- South Supermarket
- Southeast Asia Retail
  - Landers Superstore
- Super 8 Grocery Warehouse
- Unitop Supermarket
- Ultra Mega
- Vercons Supermarket
- WalterMart Supermarket

== Defunct supermarket chains ==
- Glo-ri's Supermart – acquired by SM from Glorimart Inc. and all branches subsequently converted into Savemore Markets
- Pilipinas Makro – initially fully taken over by SM and all branches subsequently converted into SM Hypermarkets, Savemore Markets or abandoned
- Queen's Supermart – after 1981 Harrison Plaza fire, and reopening in the 1984, it was replaced by Rustan's Supermarket, before eventually converted into Shopwise
- Rempson Supermarket – Operated by the Samson family from Marikina; closed by the 2000s
- Rustan's Supermarket – discontinued following takeover by Robinsons Retail Holdings Inc.
- TOBY's – taken over by Robinsons Retail Holdings Inc.
- Wellcome – turned into Robinsons Easymart

== Gallery ==
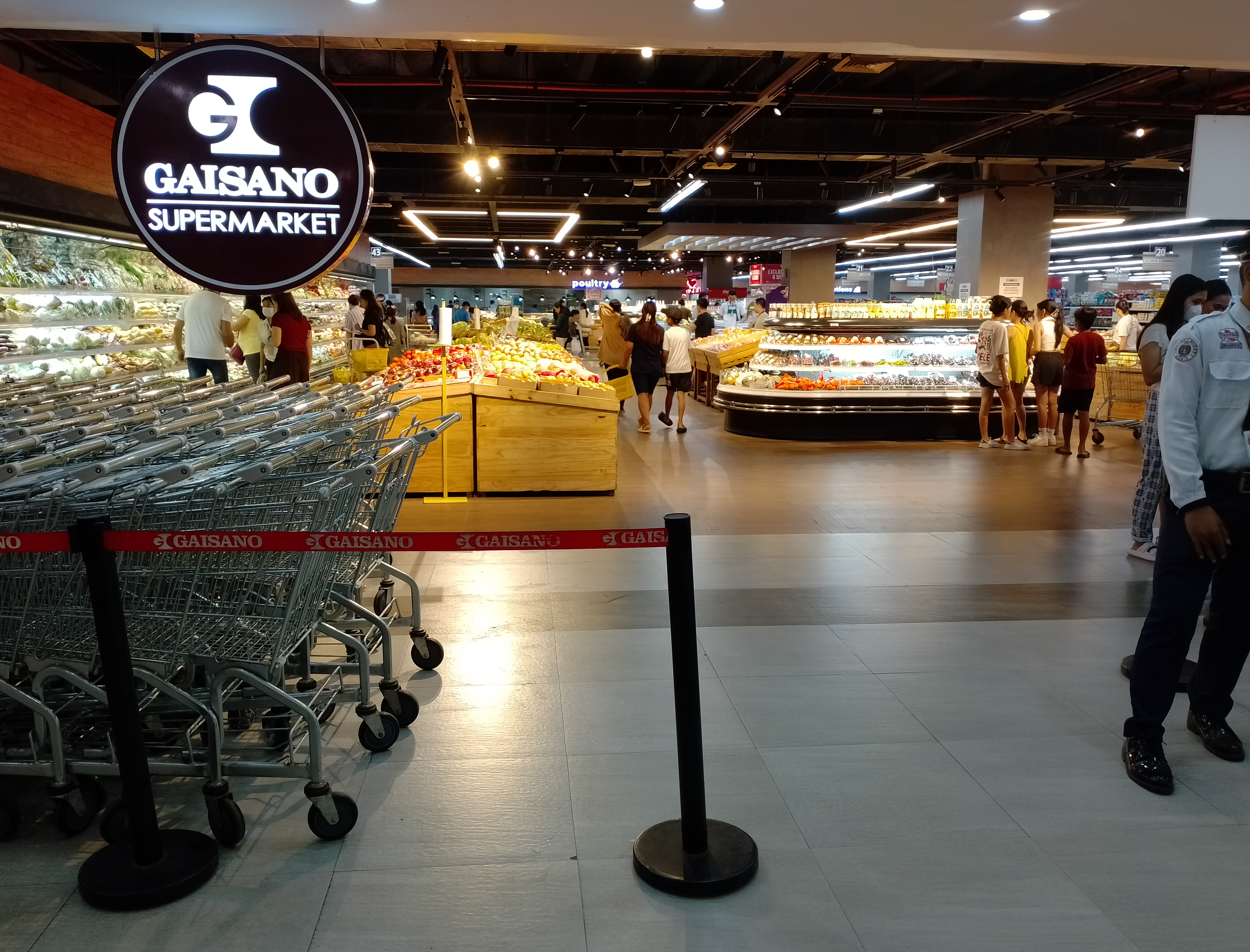
Gaisano Supermarket (Gaisano Country Mall branch, Cebu City)

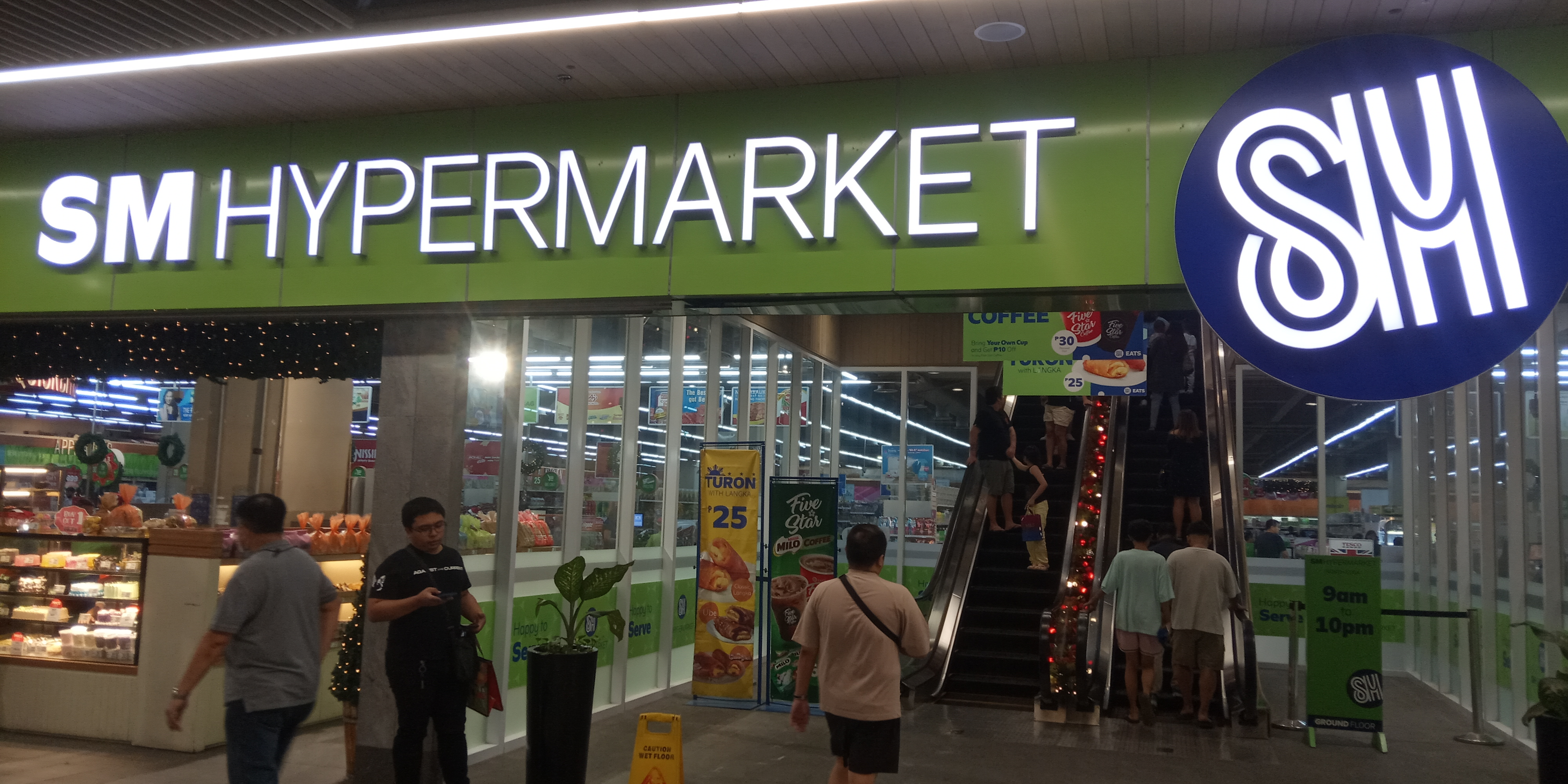
SM Hypermarket (North EDSA branch)

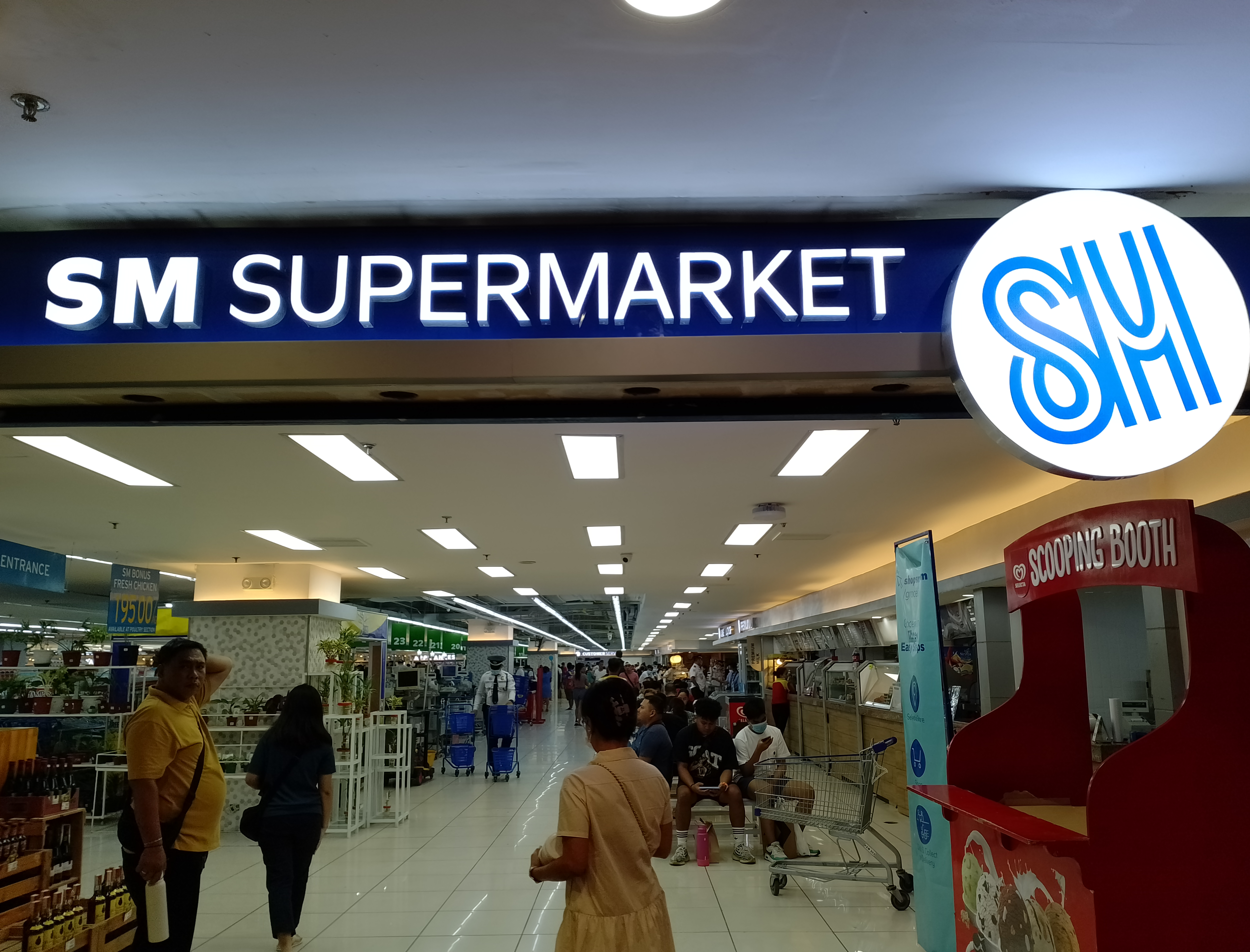
SM Supermarket (SM City Cebu branch)

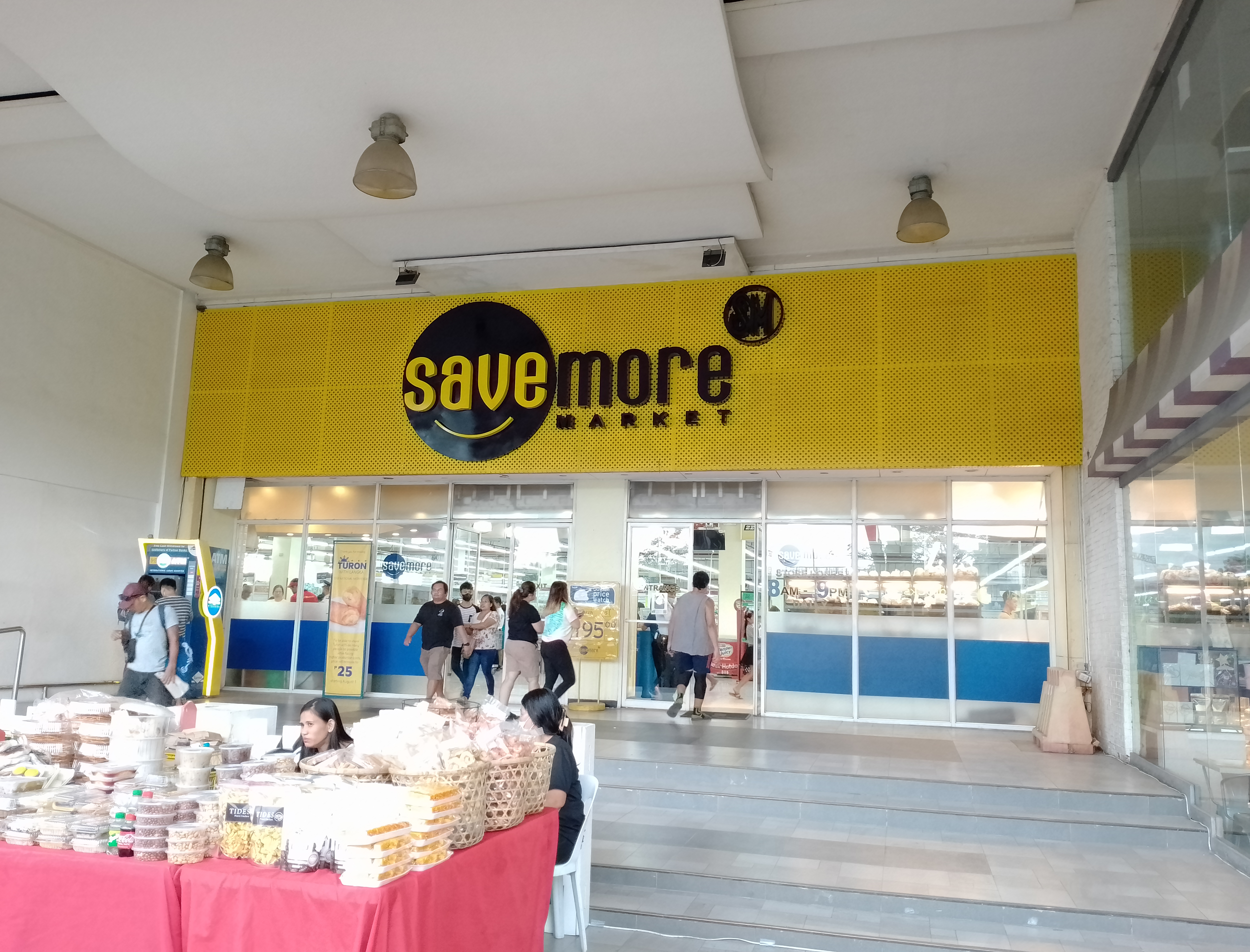
Savemore Market (Parkmall branch, Mandaue)

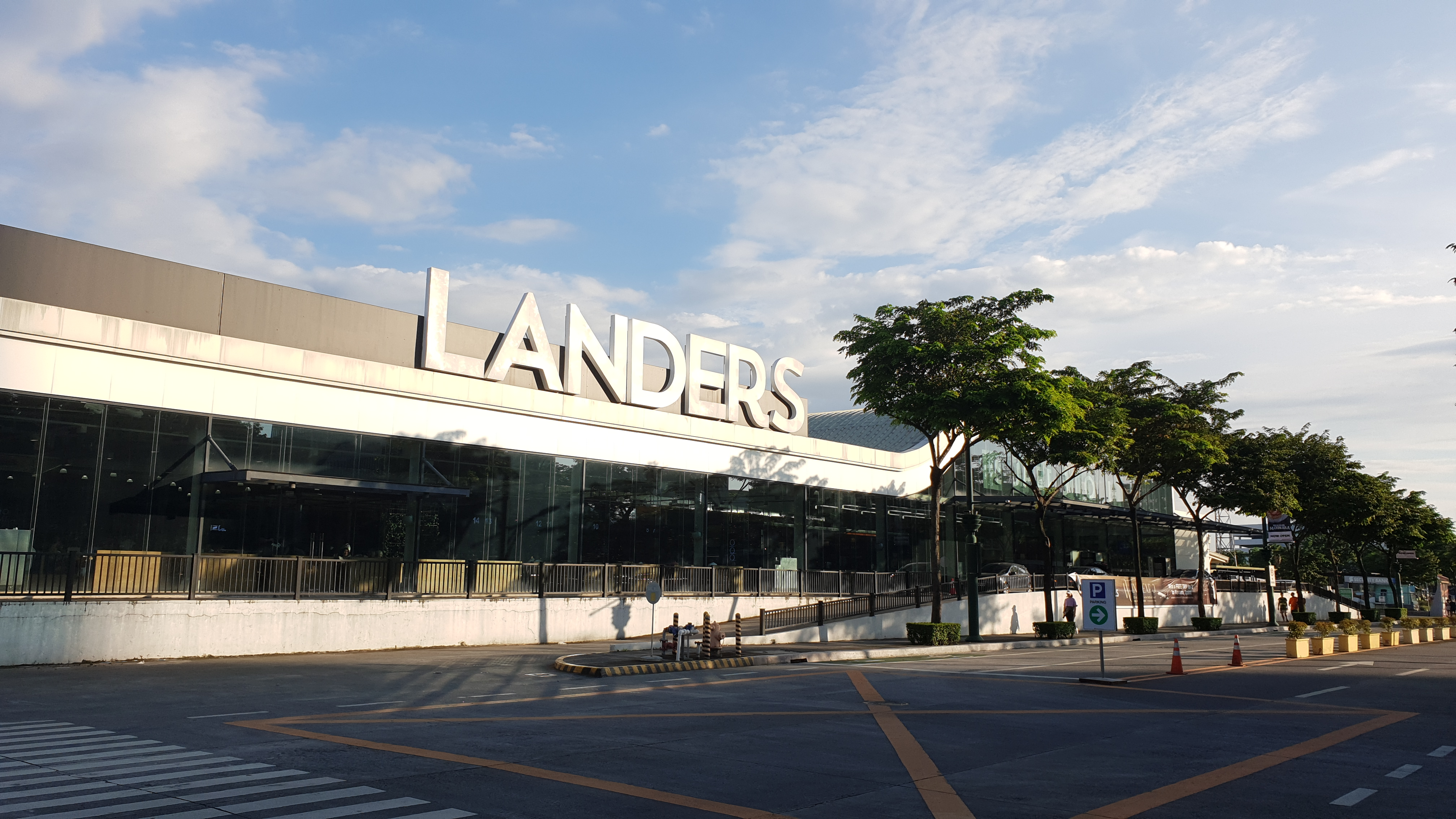
Landers Superstore (Arcovia City branch)

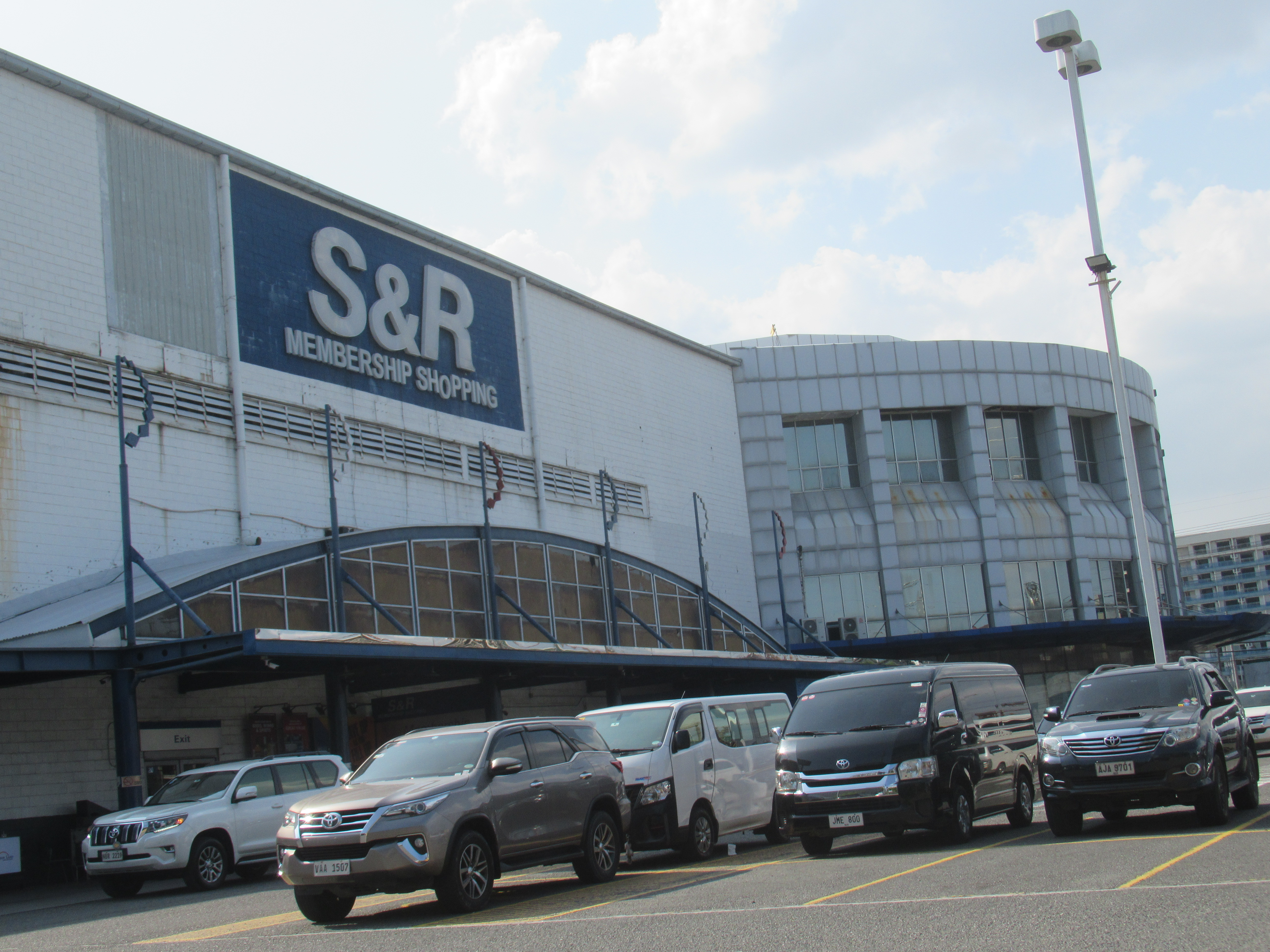
S&R Membership Shopping (Aseana branch)

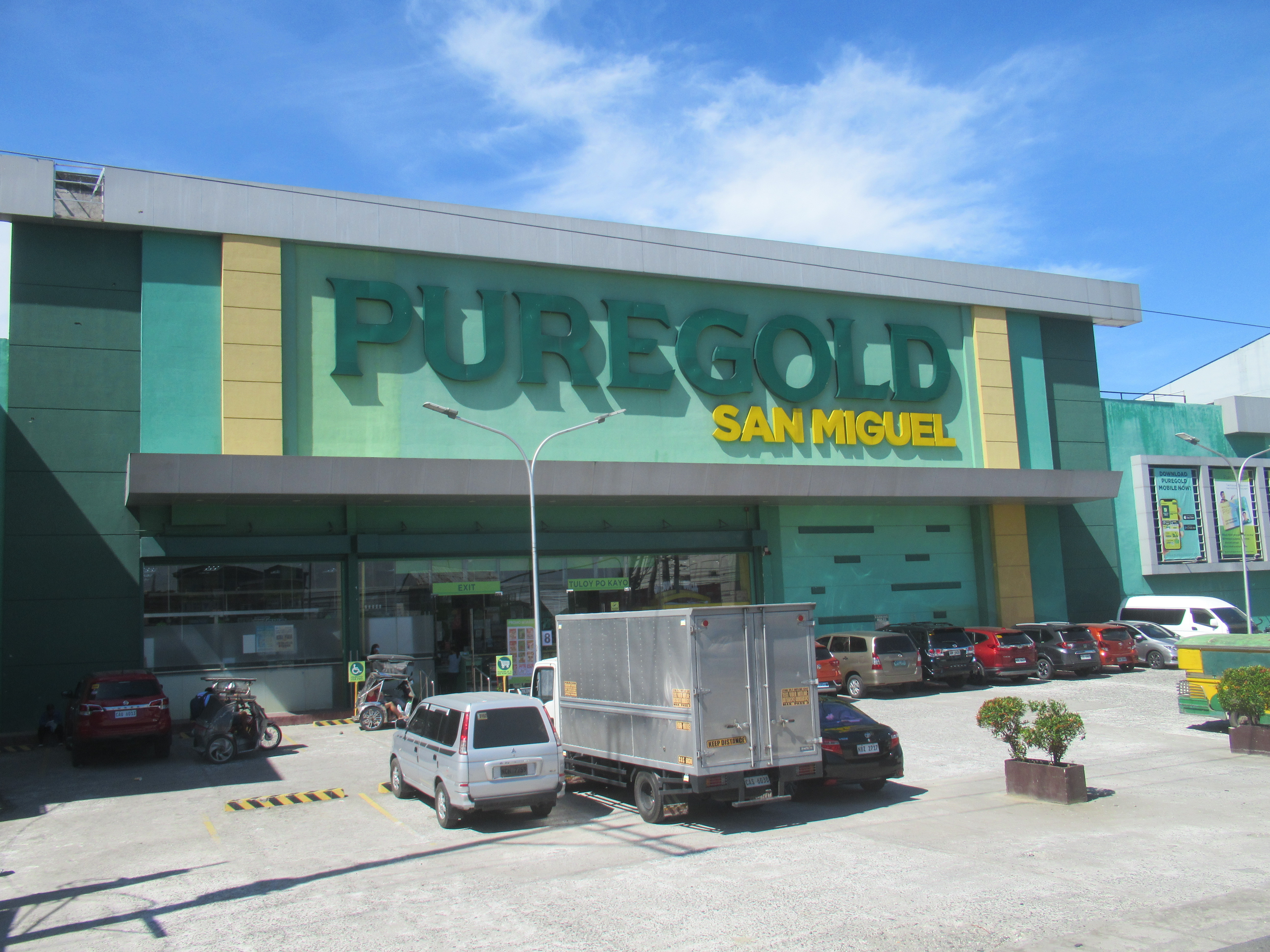
Puregold (San Miguel branch)

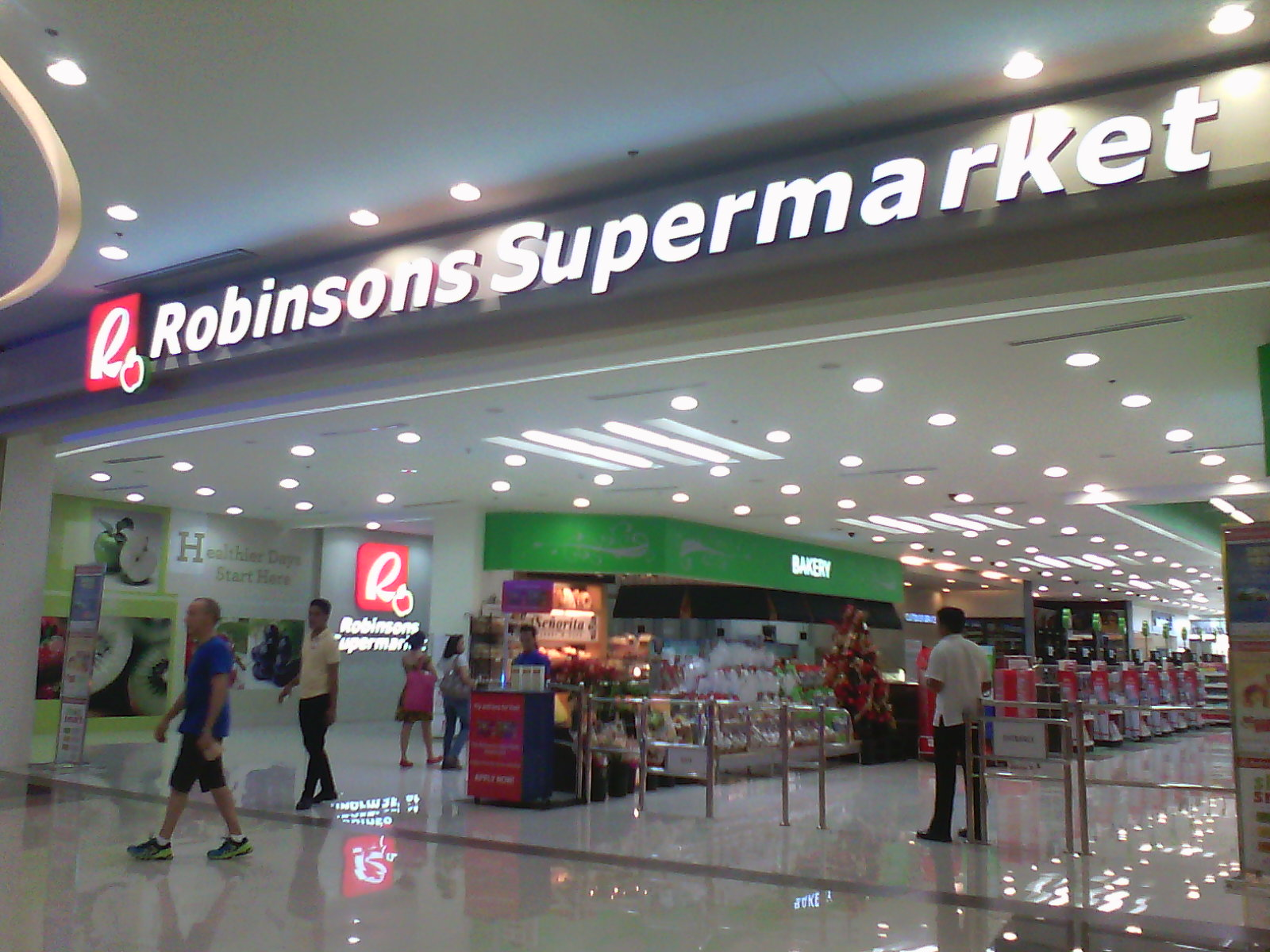
Robinsons Supermarket (Las Piñas branch)

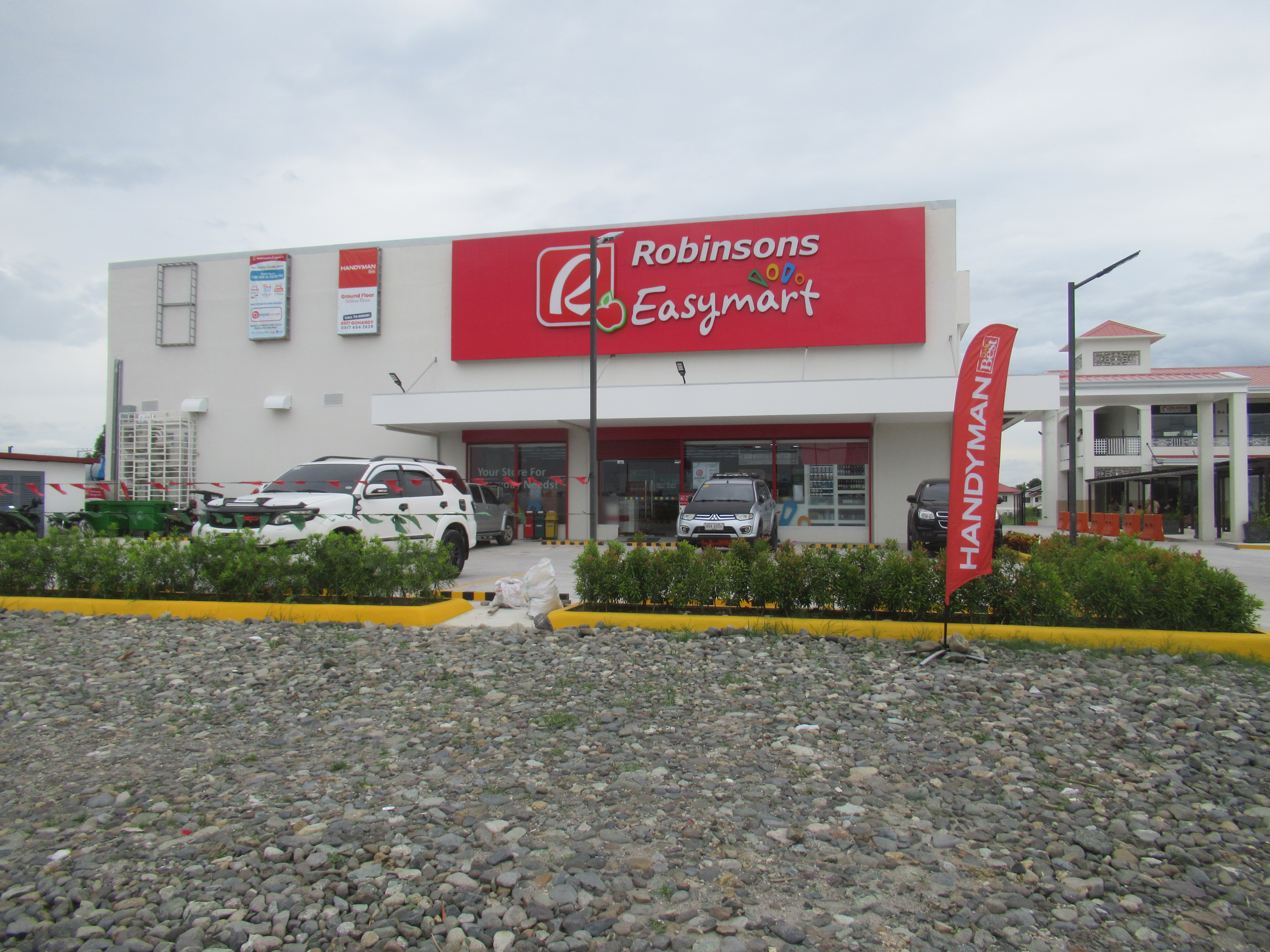
Robinsons Easymart (Solana branch, Bacolor)

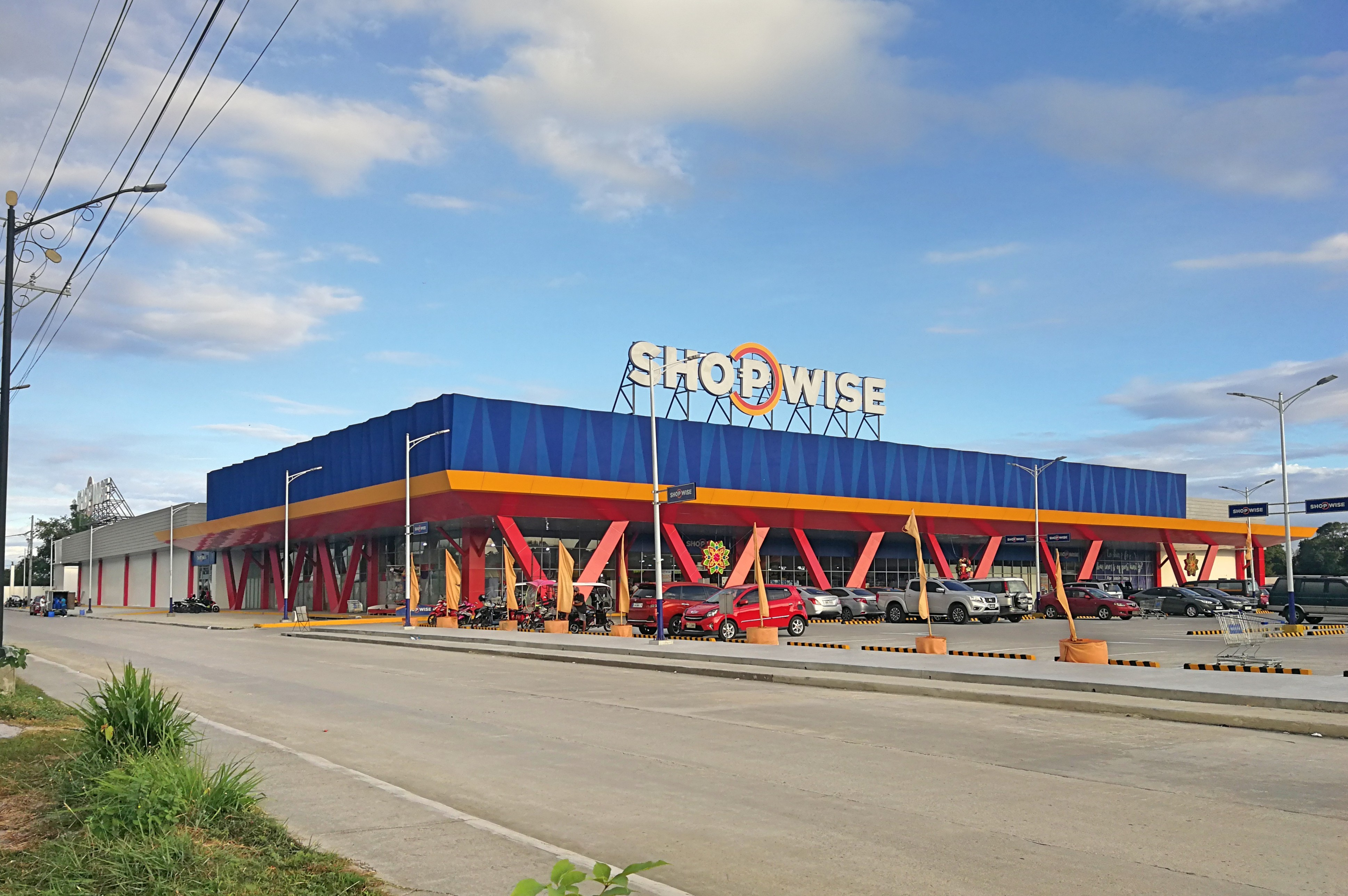
Shopwise (Lancaster New City branch, Imus)

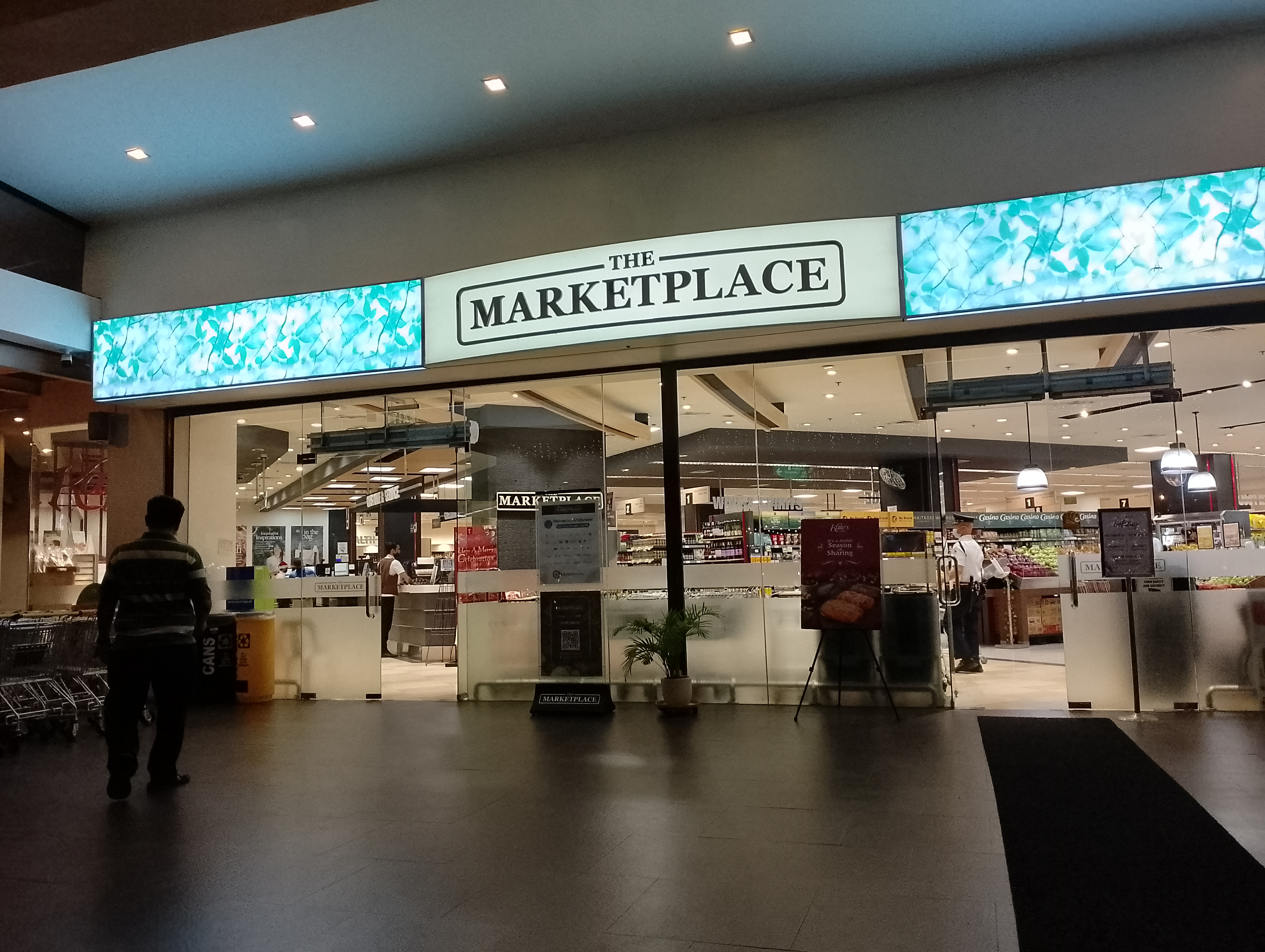
The Marketplace (Oakridge Business Park branch, Mandaue)

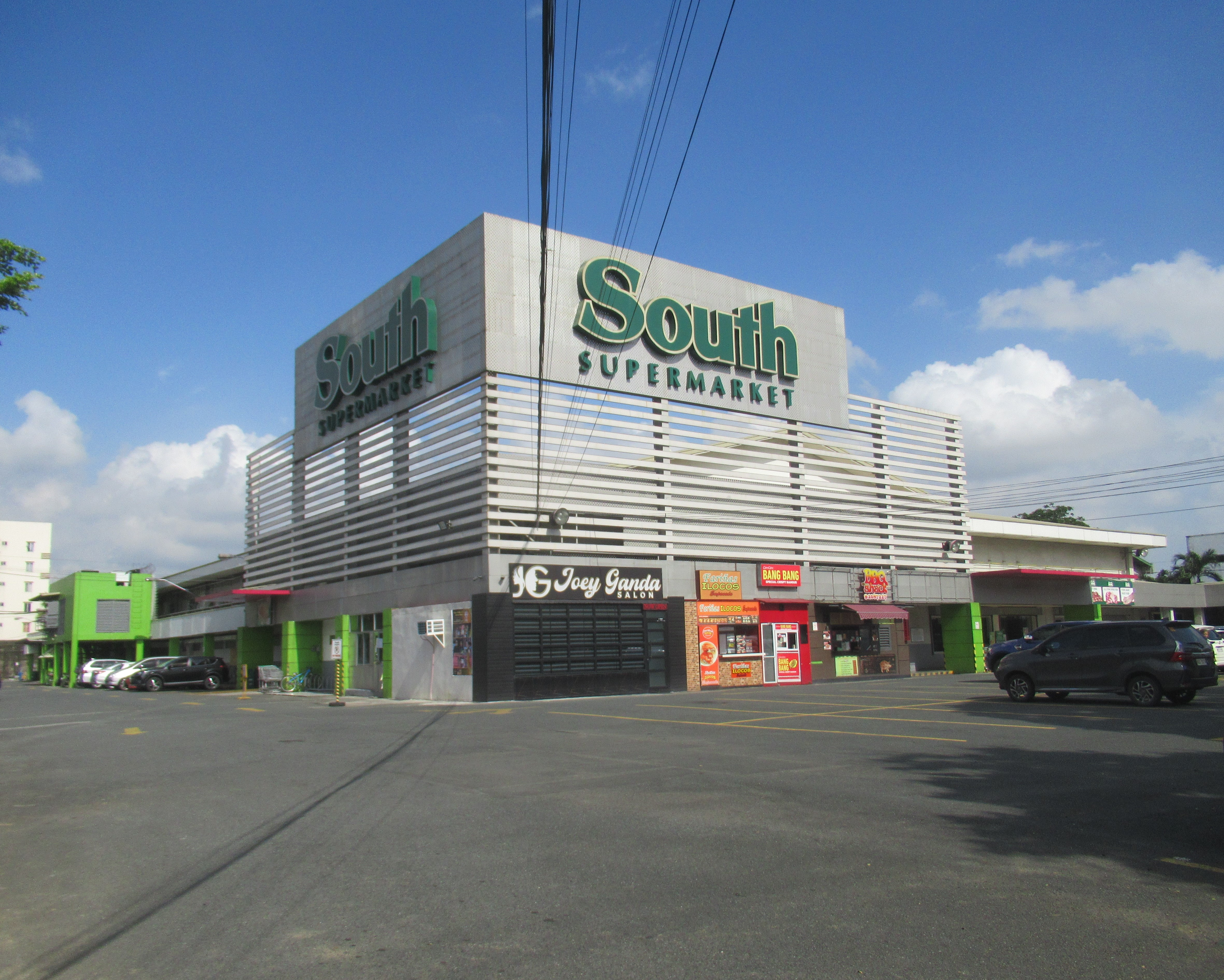
South Supermarket (Pasig branch)

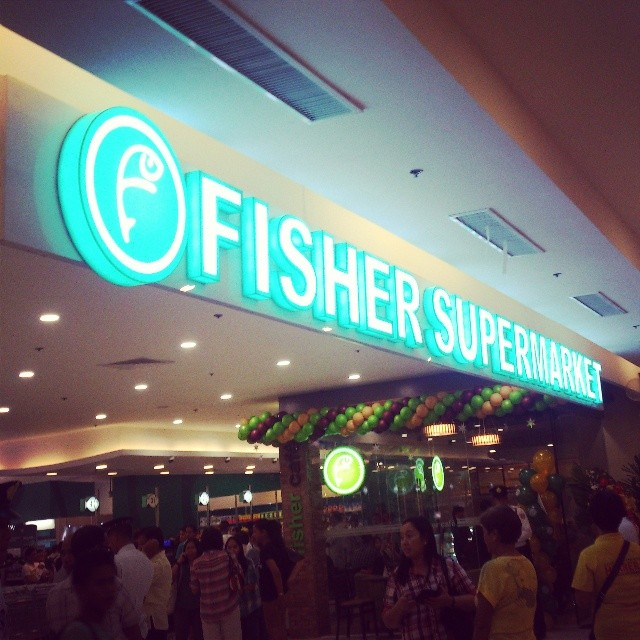
Fisher Supermarket (Quezon City branch)

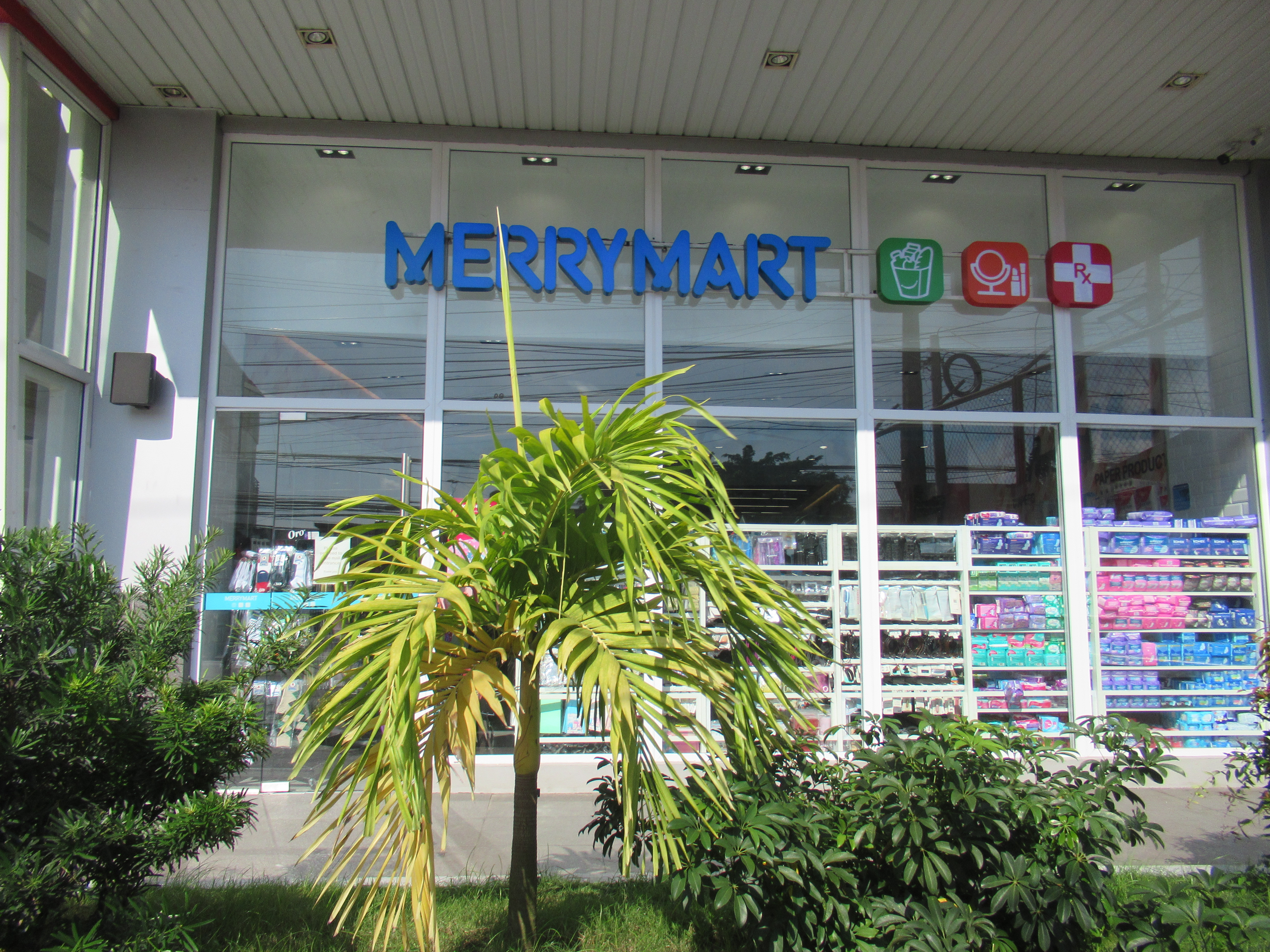
MerryMart (CityMall Bocaue branch)

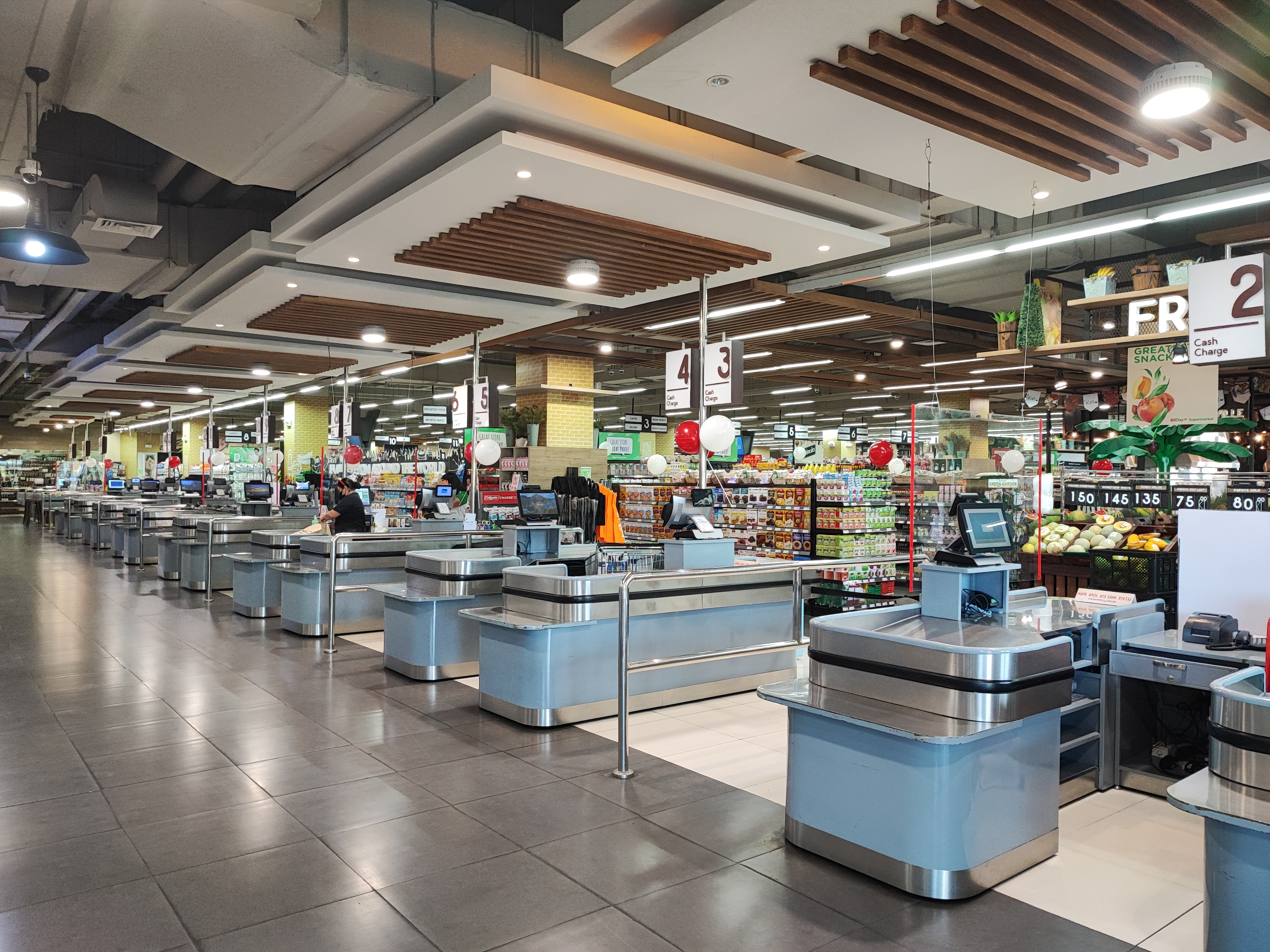
Interior of All Day Supermarket (Balanga branch)
