= Gaisano =

== People ==
- Gaisano family, a business family involved in the Philippine retail industry

== Business ==
- Gaisano Brothers, Inc., a shopping mall chain, operator of Gaisano Country Mall, Gaisano Main, Gaisano Bogo, Gaisano Moalboal, and Gaisano Balamban in Cebu
- Gaisano Capital, a retail-chain ran by the Gaisano Capital Group
- Gaisano Malls and GMalls, a shopping mall chain ran by the DSG Group
- Gaisano Grand Malls, a shopping mall chain ran by the Gaisano Grand Group
- JS Gaisano, a shopping mall and retail-chain in Mindanao ran by JHG Trading, Inc.
- Metro Retail Stores Group, a retail company that operates department stores and supermarkets which was formerly known as Metro Gaisano
- Unipace Corporation, a shopping mall chain based in Cagayan de Oro City in Mindanao, operator of Gaisano City Mall in Cagayan de Oro, Gaisano Iligan, Gaisano Malaybalay, Gaisano Valencia, Gaisano Butuan, Gaisano Camiguin and Gaisano Tubod
