= List of shopping mall retailers in the Philippines =

Shopping malls play an important role in the Philippine economy. Major Philippine mall chains include SM Supermalls, which has over 86 shopping malls around the country, and Ayala Malls, which has 31 shopping malls nationwide. Other major mall chains include Robinsons Malls, Walter Mart malls, Gaisano Malls, Ever Gotesco Malls, and Isetann.

== Operational mall retailers ==
=== Metro Manila ===
Company	Headquarters	Branches	Year founded	Notes
Ayala Malls	Makati	31	1988	
CityMall	Makati	43	2013	
Ever Gotesco Malls	Manila	1	1972	
Filinvest Lifemalls	Muntinlupa	5	1998	
Greenfield Development	Mandaluyong	4	1961	
Isetann	Manila	5	1980	
Megaworld Lifestyle Malls	Quezon City	10	2009	
Ortigas Malls	Pasig	4	1966	
Primark Town Center	San Juan	?	1996	
Robinsons Malls	Quezon City	61	1997	
SM Supermalls	Pasay	90	1985	
Starmalls	Mandaluyong	4	1972	
Unitop Malls	Parañaque	?		
Vista Malls	Las Piñas	26	2012	
Walter Mart	Quezon City	45	1992	

=== Outside Metro Manila ===
Company	Headquarters	Branches	Year founded	Notes
City Supermarket	Dagupan	18	?	
Gaisano Malls (DSG Sons Group, Inc.)	Davao City	6	1997	
Gaisano Capital	Cebu City	43	1977	
Gaisano Grand Malls	Cebu City	47	1979	
Gaisano Main Group	Cebu City	5		
Gaisano Unipace Corporation	Cagayan de Oro	8		
JS Gaisano Malls	Tagum	4		
KCC Malls	General Santos	5	1989	
Liberty Commercial Center (LCC Malls)	Tabaco, Albay	15	1981	
New City Commercial Corporation (NCCC Malls)	Davao City	18	1978	
Ororama Supercenters Incorporated	Cagayan de Oro	3	1969	

== Defunct mall retailers ==
=== Metro Manila ===
Company	Headquarters	Branches	Year founded	Year defunct	Notes
COD Department Store	?	1	1925	2003	Closed down COD Cubao due to low sales
Fairmart	Sta Cruz Manila	2	1978	2004	Acquired By Metro Retail Stores Group
Plaza Fair	Sta Cruz Manila	7	1978	2004	Acquired By Metro Retail Stores Group
Uniwide Sales	Parañaque and Las Piñas	2	1975	2013	Liquidated due to failure of corporate rehabilitation and the acquisition of The Landmark Corporation

== See also ==
- List of shopping malls in the Philippines
