= EastWest Bank =

Bank in the Philippines

East West Banking Corporation

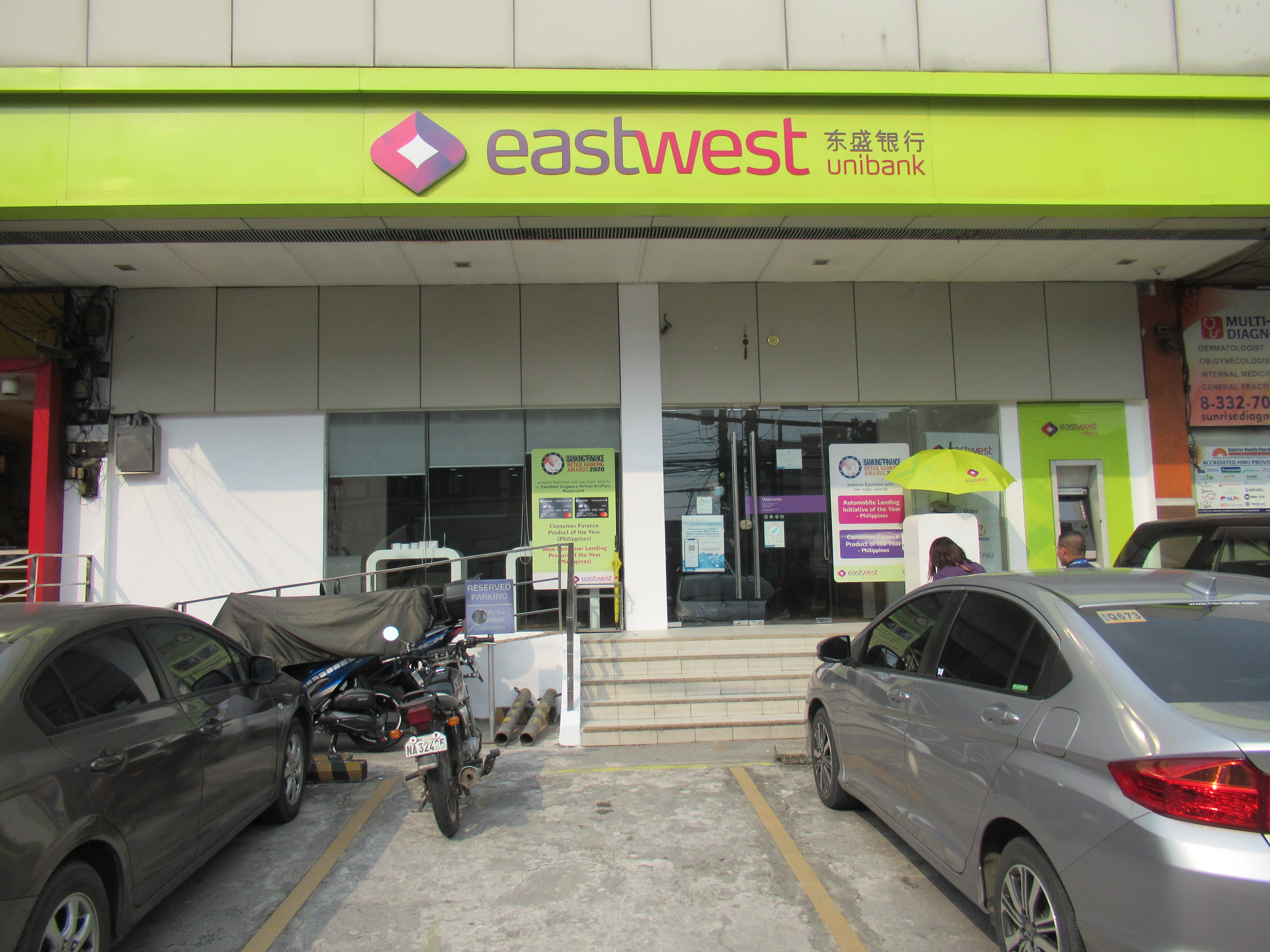
- An EastWest branch in Valenzuela
- Type: Public
- Traded as: PSE: EW
- Industry: Finance
- Founded: July 6, 1994; 32 years ago
- Founder: Andrew Gotianun
- Headquarters: The Beaufort, 5th Avenue corner 23rd Street, Bonifacio Global City, Taguig, Metro Manila, Philippines
- Number of locations: 490 stores (including its subsidiaries as of 2022); 584 ATMs (2022)
- Key people: Jonathan T. Gotianun (Chairman); Antonio C. Moncupa, Jr. (Vice Chairman); Jacqueline S. Fernandez (President & Director)
- Services: Banking
- Net income: ▲ ₱4.6 billion (2022)
- Total assets: ▲ ₱403.8 billion (2022)
- Number of employees: 6,664 (as of 2016)
- Parent: Filinvest Group
- Subsidiaries: EastWest Rural Bank, Inc. EastWest Ageas Life Insurance Corporation; EastWest Insurance Brokerage, Inc. EastWest Leasing and Finance Corporation; Quest Marketing and Integrated Services, Inc. Assurance Solutions Insurance Agency
- Website: www.eastwestbanker.com

EastWest Bank (PSE: EW, Hokkien Chinese: 東盛銀行; Pe̍h-ōe-jī: Tang-sēng Gûn-hâng; Mandarin simplified Chinese: 东盛银行; traditional Chinese: 東盛銀行; pinyin: Dōngshèng Yínháng), formally known as East West Banking Corporation, is the 11th largest bank in the Philippines in terms of assets. It was founded in 1994 in Manila by the late tycoon Andrew Gotianun and his wife. The bank is a member of the Filinvest Group, led by the Gotianun family. Its headquarters is located at The Beaufort, a condominium building by Filinvest in Bonifacio Global City.

== History ==
EastWest Bank was created on August 14, 1988. It was on that date that the Bangko Sentral ng Pilipinas granted EastWest Bank its commercial banking license. Backed-up by the Filinvest Group of Companies, EastWest Bank opened to the public along Senator Gil Puyat Avenue, Makati on August 1, 1994. This was the comeback of the Gotianuns in the banking space, after they sold the Insular Bank of Asia and America to PCIBank in 1986 (which was acquired by Equitable Bank forming Equitable PCI Bank, which in turn was acquired by Banco de Oro in 2006) and Family Savings Bank to Bank of the Philippine Islands (which was renamed as BPI Family Savings Bank).

EastWest Bank has developed its online banking facilities and has embarked on a full computerization program for a more efficient system to deliver bank products and services.

In 2003, EastWest Bank had a network of 129 branches and 145 ATM terminals, this was after the merger with the former Ecology Savings Bank in 2002 and the former AIG Philam Savings Bank in 2009. The merger resulted in EastWest Bank becoming the sixth largest lender for housing, auto and credit cards in the country.

In 2004, the Bank received the "Best Website Award" in the Banking and Finance category of the 7th Philippine Web Awards.

EastWest Unibank joined the Philippine Stock Exchange on May 7, 2012. The bank was later on granted a universal banking license on July 31, 2012.

=== Acquisition of Green Bank of Caraga ===
On October 31, 2013, EastWest Bank acquired Green Bank (also known as Green Bank of Caraga), the largest rural bank in the Caraga region in terms of assets. Based in Butuan, Green Bank has been serving the needs of mostly farmers, government and private employees, barangay officials, pensioners and small-scale businessmen. Through Green Bank's strong branch network in the Visayas and Mindanao, EastWest is able to gain entry into the microfinance business.

Green Bank Inc. was one of the first participating banks under the Microenterprise Access to Banking Services (MABS), a program designed to accelerate national economic transformation by encouraging Philippine rural banks to significantly expand the financial services they offer to microentrepreneurs and low-income households in the countryside. Green Bank was also recognized as among the first to use the services of an independent credit ratings agency to boost its loan quality.

=== Acquisition of Standard Chartered Bank Philippines ===
In 2016, EastWest acquired the retail banking business of Standard Chartered Bank Philippines (SCB PH), which included credit cards, personal loans, wealth management, and retail deposits. SCB PH's retail accounts, personnel, and branches were all transferred to EW on November 27, 2016.

=== Inception of Komo by EastWest ===
In 2020, East West Banking Corporation (EWBC) was one of the few local banks in the Philippines that was granted a license by the Bangko Sentral ng Pilipinas (BSP) to launch a fully-digital bank which will operate under its wholly owned subsidiary, EastWest Rural Bank, Inc. The new digital banking arm of EastWest will carry the brand name, Komo. It was given an approval from the Bangko Sentral ng Pilipinas (BSP) to operate as a digital bank on May 8, 2020.

In 2024, Olympic gold medalist Carlos Yulo was named as the bank's brand ambassador.

== Subsidiaries and affiliates ==
EastWest Bank joined BancNet in 1994 as an Associate member, with full use of the network's facilities and services but without voting rights. In late 2008, EastWest Bank acquired a shareholding in the network, affording the Bank a Board seat as a full member bank.

EastWest Bank is divided into the following subsidiaries:

- EastWest Ageas Life Insurance Corporation
- EastWest Insurance Brokerage Inc.
- EastWest Leasing and Finance Corporation
- Quest Marketing and Integrated Services Inc.
- Assurance Solutions Insurance Agency

=== EastWest Rural Bank ===
EastWest Rural Bank, Inc.
- Type: Subsidiary
- Industry: Finance and Insurance
- Founded: 1975; 51 years ago in Butuan, Agusan del Norte, Philippines (as Rural Green Bank of Caraga); 2013; 13 years ago in Pasig, Metro Manila, Philippines (as EastWest Rural Bank, Inc.)
- Headquarters: Bajada, Davao City, Philippines
- Number of locations: 98 stores (including extension offices (EO) and other banking offices (OBO) as of 2022)
- Key people: Sheila M. Bajado, CPA (President and CEO)
- Products: Financial services
- Net income: ₱1.2 billion ▲(2018)
- Total assets: ₱24.6 billion ▲(3Q-2022)
- Number of employees: 1,000
- Parent: East West Banking Corporation

EastWest Rural Bank Inc. is a wholly owned subsidiary of East West Banking Corporation, a member of the Filinvest Group, led by the Gotianun Family. It is the second largest rural bank in the Philippines in terms of assets.

It was formerly known as Green Bank (or the Rural Green Bank of Caraga), which was a Philippine rural bank based in Butuan and also acquired since 2013 by East West Banking Corporation alongside FinMan Bank, a rural bank based in Pasig. Prior to its acquisition it was the largest bank in the Caraga region in terms of assets, and it had 46 branches. It was also one of three rural banks to be affiliated with the Philippine interbank network BancNet since 2006.

==== History ====
Green Bank was incorporated with the Filipino Securities and Exchange Commission as the Rural Bank of Nasipit on June 20, 1974. The bank commenced actual operations on April 5, 1975, originally to serve the municipality of Nasipit, Agusan del Norte.

The bank took advantage of a government rediscounting program called Masagana 99, with the intention of helping poor farmers gain access to credit. However, in the 1980s, with the plunge of the Philippine economy into a recession and the assassination of Benigno Aquino Jr., Green Bank suffered a very high non-performing loan ratio due to the inability of its farmer-debtors to pay off their Masagana 99 loans. For the next few years, the bank's financial standing gradually deteriorated.

In 1988, the Central bank of the Philippines, the Bangko Sentral ng Pilipinas issued Circular No. 1126 in 1988, designed to help recapitalize and revitalize distressed rural banks. In the case of Green Bank, it had arrears with the Bangko Sentral amounting to nearly fifteen million pesos, requiring it to recapitalize to cope with capital deficiency. Initially, stockholders refused, although some stockholders eventually agreed to aid the bank's recapitalization.

The bank merged with the Rural Bank of Alegria in 2000, becoming the largest rural bank in the Caraga region. It joined BancNet in 2006, being one of three banks that joined the interbank network.

The bank followed the Grameen Bank experimentation with conversion of borrowers from joint liability loans, to individual liability loans, with no drop in repayments.

EastWest Rural Bank, or EWRB (formerly FinMan Bank Inc.), consolidated the rural banking businesses of two previously acquired banks, namely Green Bank, Inc. and FinMan Bank, Inc., through an asset acquisition effective November 1, 2013. FinMan Bank, a 16-year-old rural bank based in Pasig, is actively involved in extending credit to farmers, tenants, and rural enterprises. East West infused a total of P520 million in fresh capital into EWRB subsequent to the regulatory approval, which became effective on May 21, 2013, for the latter's increase in authorized capital stock from P80 million to P1 billion.

Utilizing Green Bank's robust branch network in the Visayas and Mindanao, EastWest strategically entered the microfinance sector and extended its footprint in Mindanao to enhance its rural lending business. Regulatory approval for this acquisition was granted in December 2013. As of 2016, EastWest Rural Bank had a total branch network of 76 stores, including extension offices and other banking offices all throughout the country.

== Ownership ==
- Filinvest Development Corporation: 75%
- PCD Nominee Corporation: 24.87%
- Philippine Air Force Educational Fund: 00.03%
- Washington Sycip: 00.03%

== See also ==
- BancNet
- List of banks in the Philippines
