= Alabang Town Center =

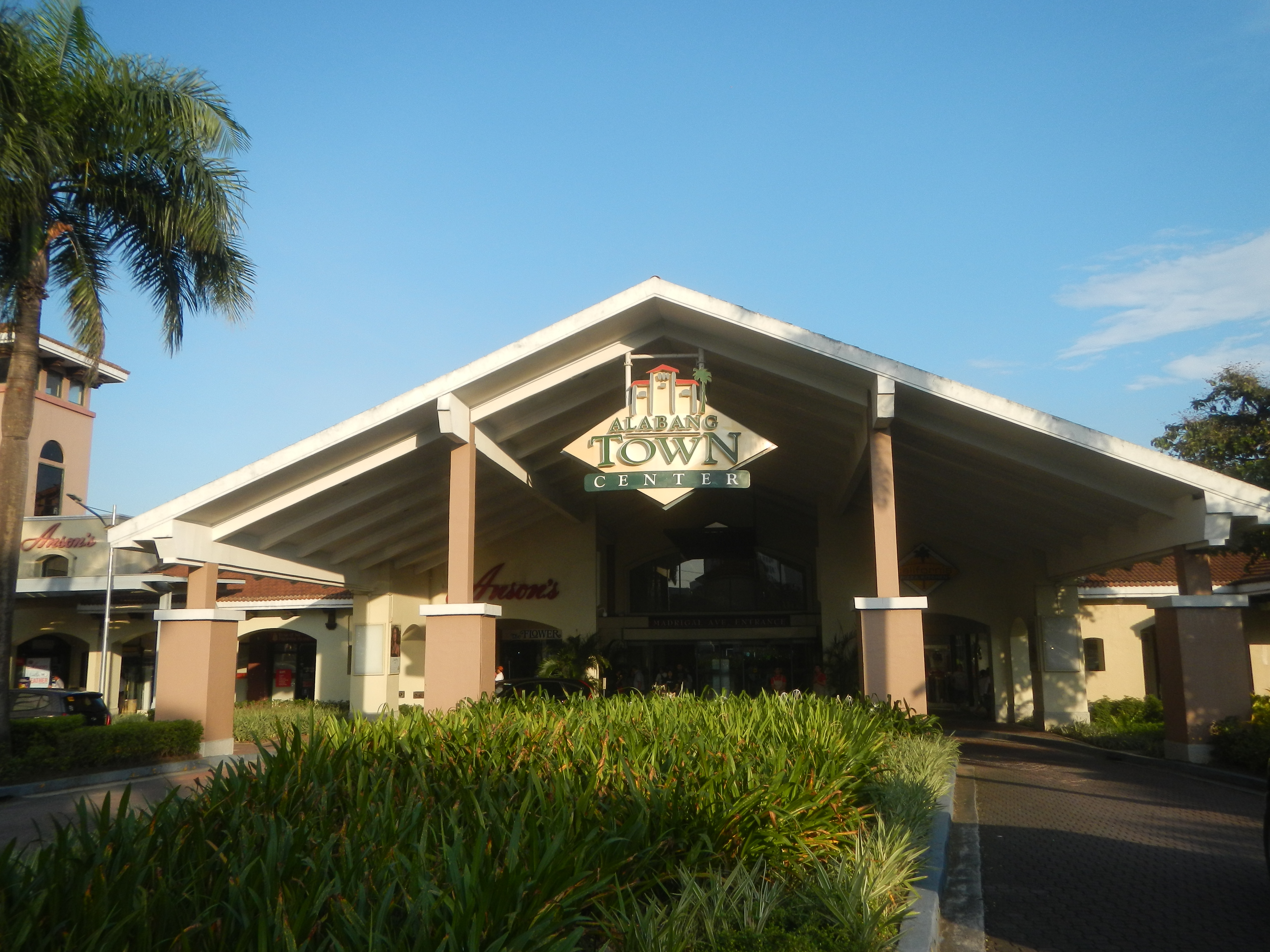
- Alabang Town Center in September 2018
- Location: Ayala Alabang, Muntinlupa, Philippines
- Coordinates: 14°25′25″N 121°01′47″E
- Opened: 1982; 44 years ago
- Developer: Ayala Land (1982–2025); Rockwell Land (2025–present)
- Manager: Alabang Commercial Center Corporation
- Owner: Alabang Commercial Center Corporation
- Architect: Benoy (2010s redesign); Carlos Ott and Jun Rodriguez (2020s renovation)
- Floor area: 48,000 square meters (520,000 sq ft)
- Floors: Old Building: 2; New Building: 4 (G/UG/2/3); Corte de las Palmas: 3 (incl. Service Town in LG); Metro Gaisano: 5 (incl. Basement)
- Public transit: 23

Alabang Town Center, often abbreviated as ATC and also known colloquially as Town Center or simply Town, is a shopping lifestyle center located south of Metro Manila, located next to gated residential communities, and business developments in Barangay Ayala Alabang, Muntinlupa. Opened in 1982, it is considered one of the oldest shopping malls in Metro Manila. It is owned and operated by Alabang Commercial Center Corporation (ACCC), a joint venture involving Rockwell Land and the Madrigal family. Ayala Land previously held a 50% stake in ACCC until selling it to the Madrigal family in 2025.

It has a total of 48,000 m^{2} (520,000 sq ft) of retail space and has several high-end retail stores, including Rustan's Department Store, and high-end brands, including Marks & Spencer and The Gap. Another major tenant of the mall is the Metro Department Store and Supermarket, which opened in August 2013 and was once the location of a passport office of the Department of Foreign Affairs. Alabang Town Center caters to the retail and dining needs of citizens living in southern Metro Manila, particularly those from Las Piñas, Parañaque, and Muntinlupa, as well as those from the neighboring provinces of Cavite and Laguna.

== History ==
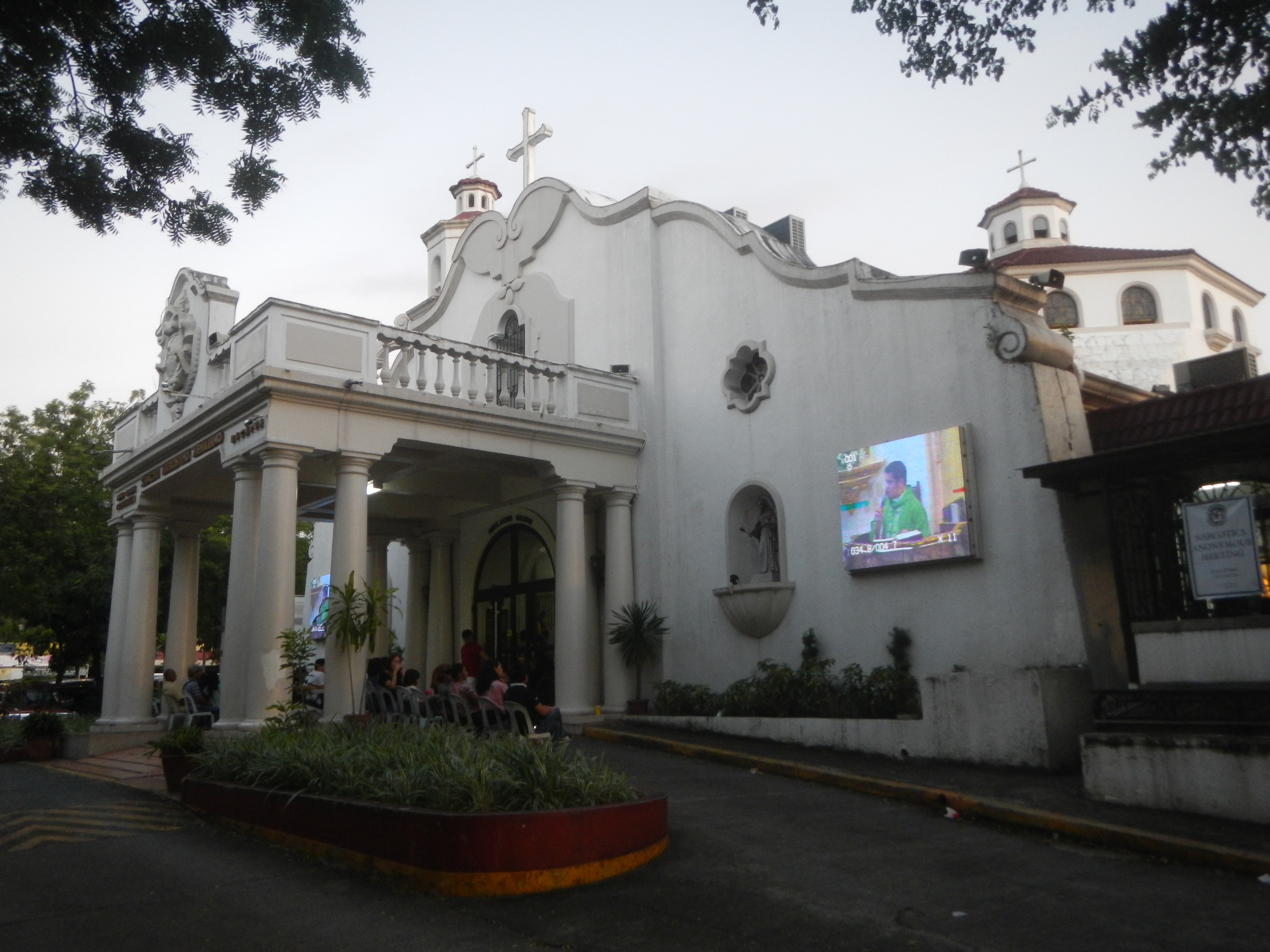
St. Jerome Emiliani and Sta. Susana Parish

=== Development ===
Alabang Town Center occupies a portion of a vast estate originally owned by the Madrigal family. In the early 1970s, the family entered negotiations with the Ayala Corporation, then led by Enrique Zobel, to divest a significant tract of their Alabang holdings. Rather than a straightforward sale, the two parties formed a joint venture to transform the area into a master-planned residential and commercial district that currently includes the Ayala Alabang Village and the Madrigal Business Park.

=== As an Ayala Mall ===
Alabang Town Center opened in 1982 as a strip mall with a supermarket and two cinemas (thus named Alabang Twin Cinemas) that had the St. Jerome Emiliani and Sta. Susana Parish, a Roman Catholic church built in the 1970s, as its anchor tenant. The mall was expanded in 1994 and 2007 and became a cosmopolitan Mediterranean-designed, airy lifestyle center.

In February 2011, Alabang Town Center underwent expansion, incorporating Metro, which is known for its comfortable and friendly retail outlets all over the country. The four-level Metro replaced the open parking lot near McDonald's and would a department store, a grocery store, and basement parking. Construction commenced on October 20, 2011, and the Metro opened in 2012. A new wing linking the Metro became operational late 2011, wherein 70 new stores were opened.

In 2012, there was an expansion and a new wing known as the lifestyle strip, adding many restaurants, stores, and shops. The same year, a pedestrianized restaurant row near the Corte de las Palmas, known as "The Street", was opened. The Metro Supermarket opened on August 11, 2012, while Metro Department Store opened on August 18, 2012. Parking was also opened to Metro and ATC customers.

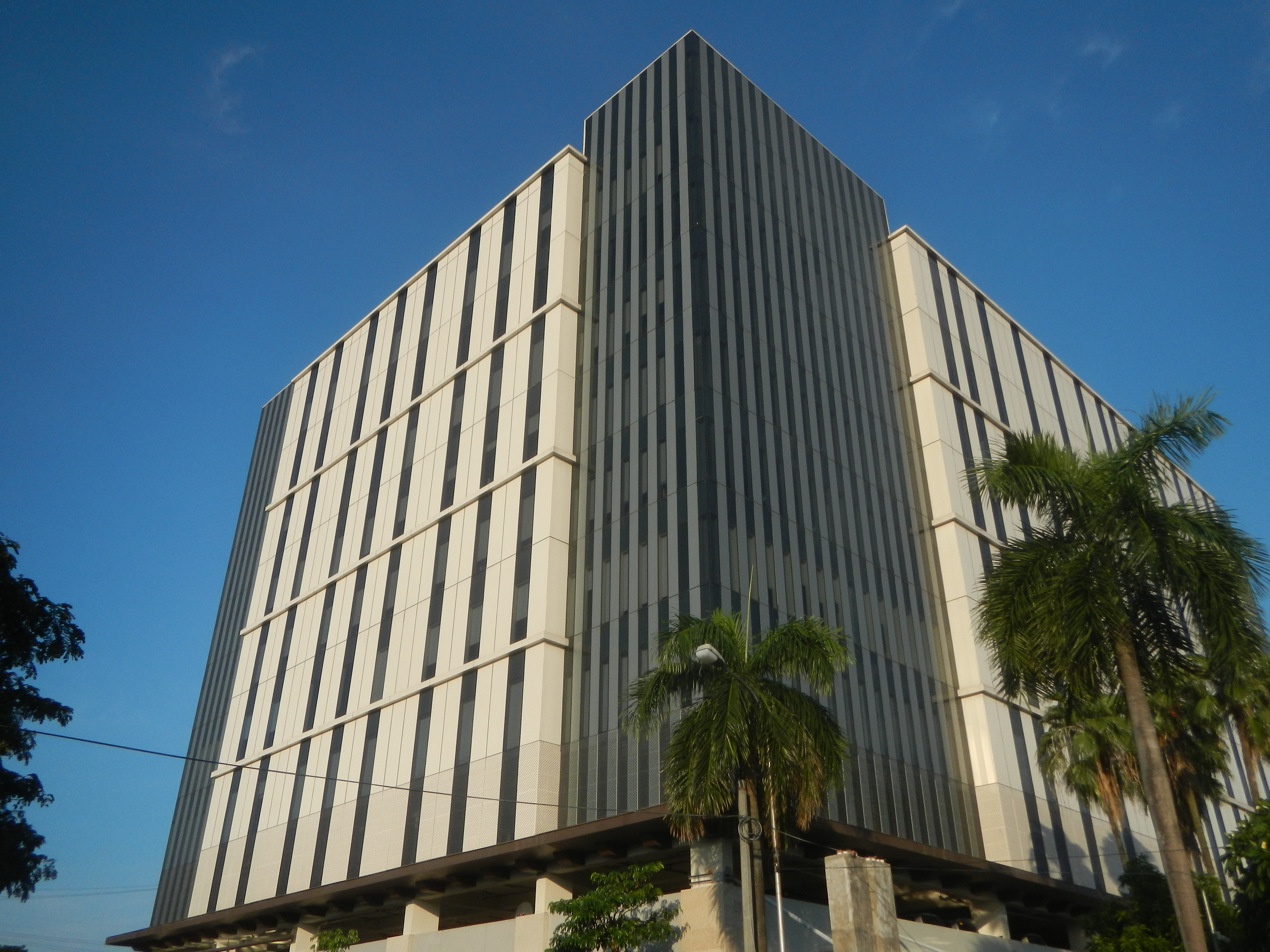
ATC Corporate Center

In 2015, the ATC Corporate Center, an office building integrated with the mall, was opened. In 2016, there are further plans for redevelopment which will include a new Lifestyle Centre.

=== Acquisition by Rockwell Land ===
On December 16, 2025, Ayala Land sold its 50-percent stake, for ₱13.5 billion (US$274.11 million), in ATC's operator, Alabang Commercial Center Corporation, to its existing joint venture partner, the Madrigal family. On December 22, 2025, Rockwell Land announced that they acquired a 74.8 percent stake on ATC for ₱21.6 billion (US$438.58 million). As a result, the cinemas became a new branch of Power Plant Cinema.

In 2026, a multi-year redevelopment master plan designed by architect Carlos Ott and Jun Rodriguez was unveiled. The first phase of the redevelopment began that year, focusing heavily on restructuring traffic flow, expanding parking, and refreshing the tenant lineup with premium global brands. This phase also initiated structural overhauls, resulting in the temporary closure of "The Street" on August 3, 2026.

== Incidents ==
- February 10, 2012: A shootout during a failed robbery of an armored van delivering cash to Czarina Foreign Exchange, a money changer outlet at the mall, at about 11:15 a.m. PHT resulted in the death of a security guard and a robbery suspect, with another security guard wounded. The robbers were unable to steal an undisclosed amount of cash and escaped on motorcycles.
- September 14, 2012: Security guards and robbers clashed at the mall's Madrigal exit during an attempt to deliver cash to Czarina Foreign Exchange at around 10:20 a.m., with the robbers fleeing on motorcycles after a failed grenade attack. The incident left one robber dead, six injured, and the amount of stolen cash unconfirmed. The Muntinlupa police chief was relieved following the incident.

== See also ==
- List of largest shopping malls in the Philippines
- List of shopping malls in Metro Manila
