= Andrew Gotianun =

Filipino businessman (1927–2016)

- Born: November 24, 1927; Republic of China
- Died: March 10, 2016 (aged 88); Metro Manila
- Occupations: Businessman, investor
- Title: Filinvest Group of Companies; Founder and Chairman Emeritus
- Spouse: Mercedes Gotianun
- Children: 4

Andrew Lo Gotianun Sr. (Chinese: 吳天恩; Pe̍h-ōe-jī: Gô͘ Thian-un; November 24, 1927 – March 10, 2016) was a Filipino businessman and investor. He was best known for running Filinvest Development Corporation, a major Filipino conglomerate which owns most of Filinvest Land, Inc. and East West Banking Corporation. Gotianun also focused on biofuels and has acquired two sugar mills and a plantation. As of 2008, his fortune had decreased sharply to $235 million, a result of the global financial downturn. However, his fortune climbed back to over $1 billion in 2014, according to Forbes.

== Business ==
Gotianun made a living from salvaging ships at the end of the Second World War. Several years later, he became involved in an automobile dealership. Later, in 1955, he founded Filinvest Development Corporation a company which became engaged in real estate in 1967.

Gotianun and his wife, Mercedes, temporarily retired from business activities in the 1980s but returned a short time later, with a plan to make improvements to the corporation. He was among those honored at the BizNewAsia Real Estate Who is Who (BREW) awards.

== Private life ==
Gotianun is second cousins once removed with fellow Filipino magnate, John Gokongwei, Jr. and is also related to the Gaisano family, where he is first cousin once removed from Doña Modesta Singson, as members of the notable Go clan in Cebu. Gotianun's grandfather (simplified Chinese: 吴文皎; traditional Chinese: 吳文皎; pinyin: Wú Wénjiǎo; Pe̍h-ōe-jī: Gô͘ Bûn-kiáu), Hispanized as "Go Quiao Co" (simplified Chinese: 吴皎哥; traditional Chinese: 吳皎哥; Pe̍h-ōe-jī: Gô͘-kiáu-ko) was a half brother of Gokongwei's great-grandfather Don Pedro Singson Gotiaoco His son, Andrew Gotianun Jr., was the vice-president of Filinvest Land.
