= Gaisano Capital =

Shopping mall in the Philippines

- Logo of Gaisano Capital
- Product type: Shopping mall chain
- Current owner: Gaisano Capital Group
- Country: Philippines
- Introduced: 1977; 49 years ago
- Related brands: Gaisano Grand Malls; Gaisano Malls; Metro Retail Stores Group
- Markets: Visayas and Mindanao (primary); Southern Luzon
- Tagline: Buy more, Spend less
- Website: www.gaisanocapital.com

Gaisano Capital is a chain of malls and supermarkets owned by Edmund S. Gaisano Sr., the second son of Henry S. Gaisano Sr. In the 1970s, he had his own construction business independent of his relatives. One of his projects was to construct a building (which was to be named the Henry Gaisano Building after his father, one of Doña Modesta's sons) located along Leon Kilat and Colon streets in Cebu City which was to be leased as a supermarket by his relatives. When the supermarket venture failed, Edmund Gaisano Sr. decided to open his own supermarket. This supermarket became the first Gaisano Capital supermarket and is presently known as Gaisano Capital South.

As of the last quarter of 2015, Gaisano Capital has 31 stores, with the recent shopping mall opened December 2011 located in Surigao City. Others were in San Francisco, Agusan del Sur (also opened in November 2014), Tandag, Bislig and recently Balingasag (opened May 2019).

== Branches ==
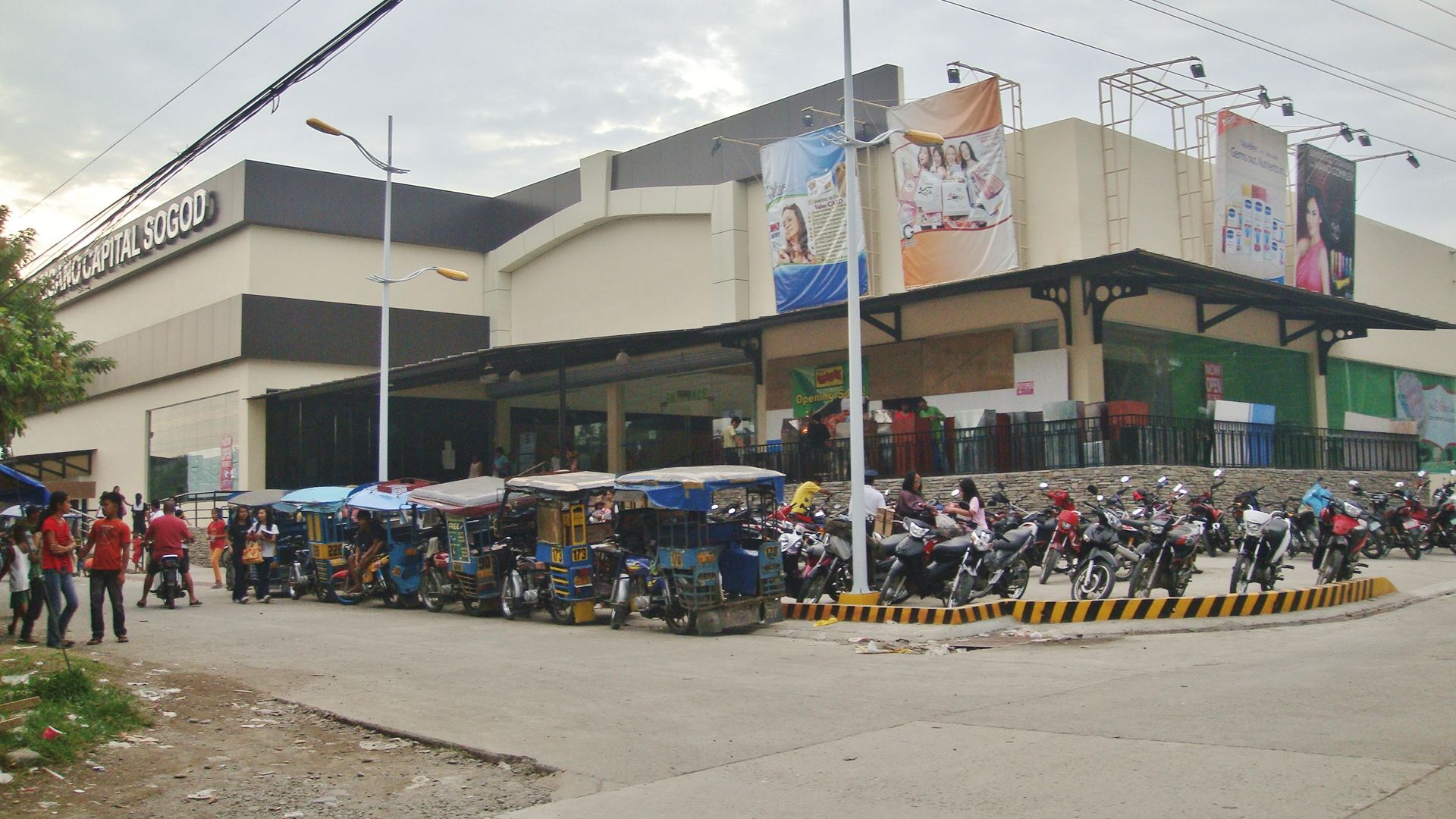
Gaisano Capital Sogod

Cebu

- City Soho Mall - B.Rodriguez St., Guadalupe, Cebu City
- Gaisano Capital Casuntingan - M.L Quezon Ave., Casuntingan, Mandaue
- Gaisano Capital Danao - F. Ralota St., Danao
- Gaisano Capital South - Henry Gaisano Bldg. Colon Cor. Leon Kilat St., Cebu City
- Gaisano Capital SRP - Laray, San Roque, Talisay, Cebu
- Gaisano Capital Tisa - F. Llamas St., Tisa, Cebu City
- Gaisano Island Mall - Pajo, Lapu-Lapu City
- Gaisano Saversmart Bacayan - Bacayan, Cebu City
- Gaisano Saversmart T. Padilla - T. Padilla St., Cebu City
- Gaisano Saversmart Danao Central - Juan Luna St., Tuburan Sur, Danao
- Gaisano Saversmart Inayawan - F.Jaca St., Inayawan, Cebu City
- Gaisano Saversmart Mactan - Basak, Lapu-Lapu City
- One Pavilion Mall - No. 7 R. Duterte St., Cebu City

Iloilo

- Gaisano Capital Balasan - Mamhut Sur, Balasan
- Gaisano Capital Guanco - Guanco St., Iloilo City
- Gaisano Capital ICC - Benigno Aquino Ave., Mandurriao District, Iloilo City
- Gaisano Capital Oton - J.C Zulueta St., Oton
- Gaisano Capital Passi - Simeon Aguilar St., Passi, Iloilo
- Gaisano City Iloilo - Luna St., La Paz District, Iloilo City
- Gaisano Capital Janiuay - Golgota, Janiuay

Leyte

- Gaisano Capital Real - 78 Real St, Tacloban
- Gaisano Capital Tacloban - J. Romualdez St., Tacloban
- Gaisano Central Tacloban - J. Romualdez St., Tacloban
- Gaisano Riverside Mall - Alegria, Ormoc
- Gaisano Saversmart Ormoc - Rizal St., Brgy. 21, Ormoc Sigat

Other Visayan provinces

- Gaisano Capital Boracay - Manocmanoc, Boracay, Malay, Aklan
- Gaisano Capital Kalibo - Andagao, Kalibo, Aklan
- Gaisano Capital San Carlos - Ledesma St., San Carlos, Negros Occidental
- Gaisano Capital Sogod - Zone V, Sogod, Southern Leyte

Mindanao

- Gaisano Capital Balingasag - Linggangao, Nat'l Highway, Balingasag
- Gaisano Capital Bislig - Mangagoy, Bislig
- Gaisano Capital Davao - Sto. Niño, Tugbok District, Davao City
- Gaisano Capital Kapatagan - Annex, Kapatagan, Lanao del Norte
- Gaisano Capital Ozamiz - Rizal Ave., Ozamiz
- Gaisano Capital Pagadian - Rizal St., Pagadian
- Gaisano Capital San Francisco - Brgy. 4, Nat'l Highway, San Francisco, Agusan del Sur
- Gaisano Capital Surigao - Km. 4, Brgy. Luna, Surigao City
- Gaisano Capital Tandag - Cabrera St. cor. Navales St., Poblacion, Tandag

Luzon

- Gaisano Capital Binangonan - Manila East Road, Calumpang, Binangonan
- Gaisano Capital Calapan - Tawiran, Nat'l Road, Calapan
- Gaisano Capital Iriga - San Roque, Iriga
- Gaisano Capital Masbate - Quezon St., Crossing, Masbate City
- Gaisano Capital San Jose - Nat'l Road, Labangan, San Jose, Occidental Mindoro
- Gaisano Capital Sorsogon - Magsaysay St., Almendras Cogon, Sorsogon City
