= Gaisano family =

Filipino business family of Chinese origins

- Current region: Visayas and Mindanao (primary), Luzon islands
- Origin: Cebu, Philippines

The Gaisano family (Tagalog pronunciation: [ɡaɪˈsano]) is a Chinese Filipino family prominent in the Philippine Retail Industry particularly in Visayas and Mindanao.

== History ==
The family's retail business began during the 1970s, Doña Modesta Singson-Gaisano with husband, Don Jose Sy Gaisano established a shop-restaurant located at the ground floor in a rented house in Colon, Cebu. The establishment later became known as White Gold Super Store.

After her death in 1982, White Gold was managed by her eldest son, David, while her other children (Stephen Sr., Henry Sr., Victor and John Sr.) established their respective retail businesses.

== Groups ==
David S. Gaisano:

- Gaisano Malls (GMall) – DSG Sons Group, Inc., White Gold Center, Gaisano Center

Stephen S. Gaisano Sr.:

- Gaisano Country Mall, Gaisano Main, Gaisano Bogo, Gaisano Moalboal, and Gaisano Balamban – Gaisano Brothers, Inc. (Alexander S. Gaisano and Stephen S. Gaisano, Jr., sons of Stephen S. Gaisano, Sr.)
- Unipace Corporation – also founded by Stephen S. Gaisano, Jr. based in Cagayan de Oro; operator of Gaisano City Mall (Cagayan de Oro), Gaisano Iligan, Gaisano Malaybalay, Gaisano Valencia and Gaisano City Valencia, Gaisano Butuan, Gaisano Camiguin, Gaisano Tubod, and Gaisano Carmen, Gaisano Bulua, Gaisano Puerto, Gaisano Osmeña, Gaisano Suki Club Cogon, and Gaisano Jr. Borja, all in Cagayan de Oro

Henry S. Gaisano Sr.:

- Gaisano Grand Malls – Benito S. Gaisano, son of Henry S. Gaisano, Sr.
- Gaisano Capital – Edmund S. Gaisano, Sr., second son of Henry S. Gaisano, Sr. (and younger brother of Benito S. Gaisano)

Victor S. Gaisano:

- Metro Retail Stores and Vicsal Development Corporation – Victor S. Gaisano

John S. Gaisano Sr.:

- JS Gaisano – JHG Trading, Inc. (John Gaisano, Jr., son of John S. Gaisano, Sr.)

== Relations ==
The Gaisano family is also a descendant branch of the prominent Go (吳) clan of Cebu, under the brothers, Don Pedro Singson Gotiaoco and his half brother Go Quiao Co, of which the former is the father of Doña Modesta Singson.

The family is related to several other prominent figures in this way, such as John Gokongwei, Jr., founder of JG Summit Holdings; Andrew Gotianun, founder of Filinvest Development Corporation.
