= Filinvest =

Real estate development and leasing in the Philippines

Filinvest Development Corporation
- Trade name: PSE: FDC
- Industry: Real estate; Hospitality; Finance; Agriculture; Power
- Founded: 1955; 71 years ago
- Founders: Andrew Gotianun Sr.; Mercedes Gotianun
- Headquarters: 6th Floor, The Beaufort, 5th Ave corner 23rd St., Bonifacio Global City, Taguig, Metro Manila, Philippines
- Key people: Jonathan Gotianun (chairman); Lourdes Josephine Gotianun-Yap (president and CEO); Nelson Bona (CFO and compliance officer)
- Subsidiaries: East West Banking Corporation; EastWest Rural Bank, Inc. FDC Utilities, Inc. Chroma Hospitality, Inc. Filinvest Alabang, Inc. Filinvest Land, Inc. ALG Holdings, Inc. Filinvest Asia Corporation; Davao Sugar Central Corporation; Pacific Sugar Holdings; Cyberzone Properties, Inc. The Palms Country Club; Festival Supermall, Inc. EastWest Ageas Life Insurance Corporation; EastWest Insurance Brokerage, Inc. EastWest Leasing and Finance Corporation; LIPAD Corporation
- Website: filinvest.com (corporate arm); filinvestland.com (real estate arm); filinvestgroup.com (holding group arm)

Filinvest Development Corporation (PSE: FDC) is the publicly listed holding company for the various firms in the Filinvest group. It was established in 1955 in the Philippines by Andrew L. Gotianun Sr. and his wife, Mercedes Gotianun, as a used-car financing company. It has holdings in real estate development and leasing, the sales of housing units, and hotel and resort management, banking and financial services, sugar and power. It is based in Metro Manila, Philippines, and is owned by the Gotianun family.

Filinvest Development Corporation is involved in the hotel and tourism industry, and owns the hotel brands Crimson and Quest, the latter of which is a new value-brand hotel. In September 2014, it was reported that it planned on opening 5,000 hotel rooms within five years. At that time, company officials stated that it had over 1,000 hotel rooms. During this time it was also reported that the company was building seven hotels, two of which will be under the new Quest value brand.

In 1996, the company owned approximately 4,000 acres "of prime real estate around Manila", along with land in Cebu and Fort Bonifacio.

== Subsidiaries ==
Logo of Chroma Hospitality, Inc.

Brand logo of Filinvest City
(formerly Filinvest Corporate City)

Logo of Filinvest Land Incorporated

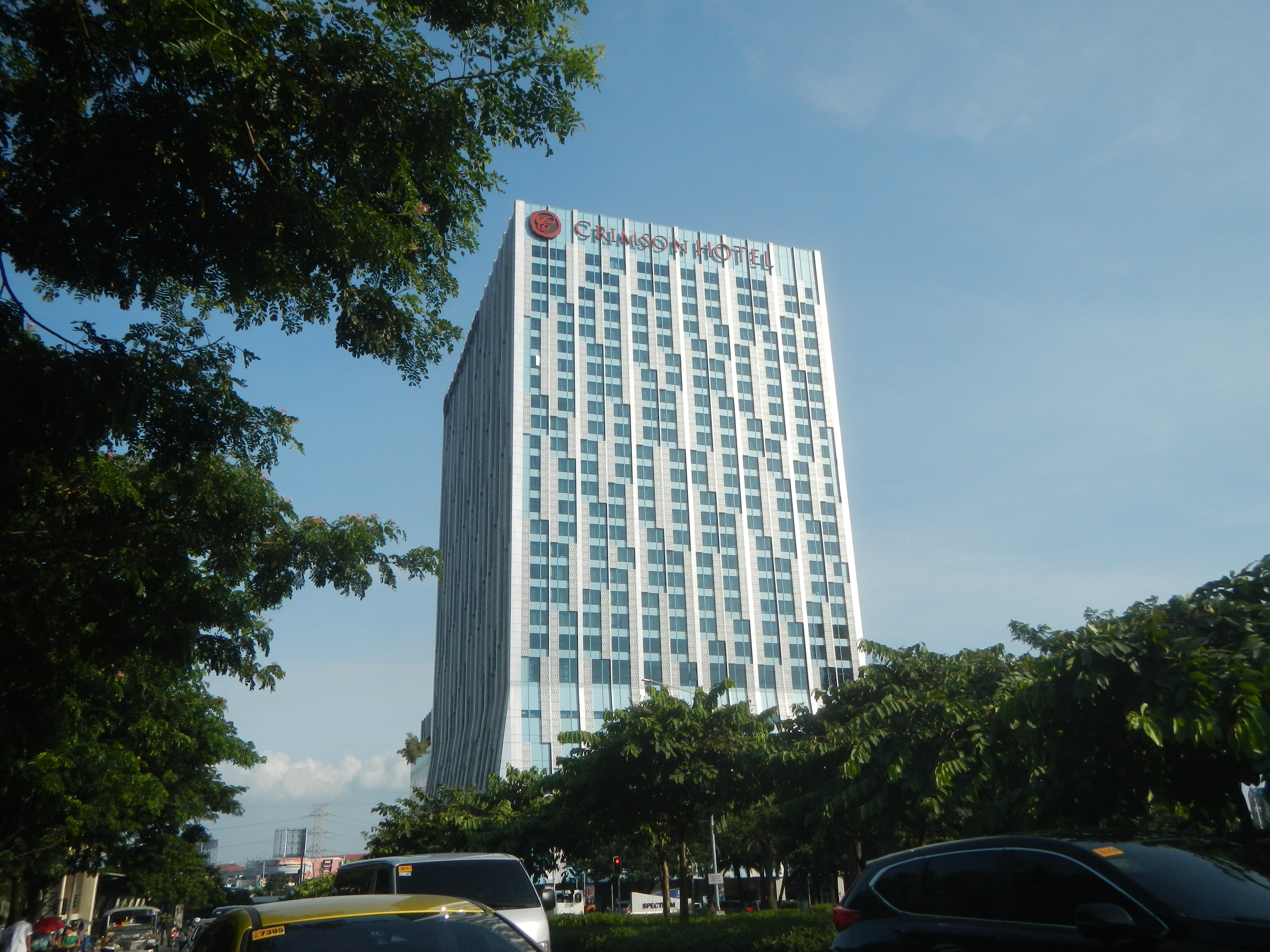
Crimson Hotel in September 2018

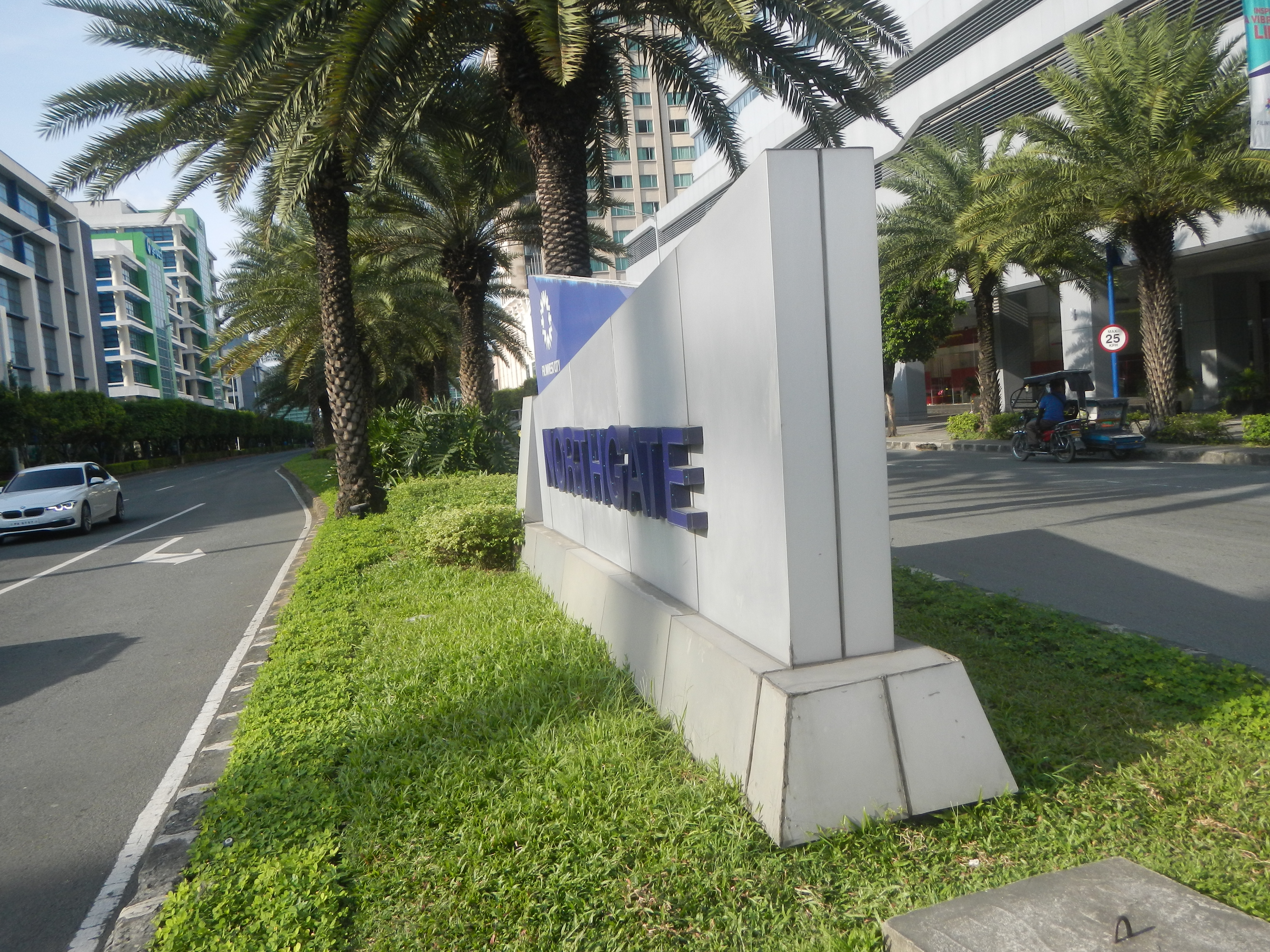
Northgate Cyberzone in September 2018

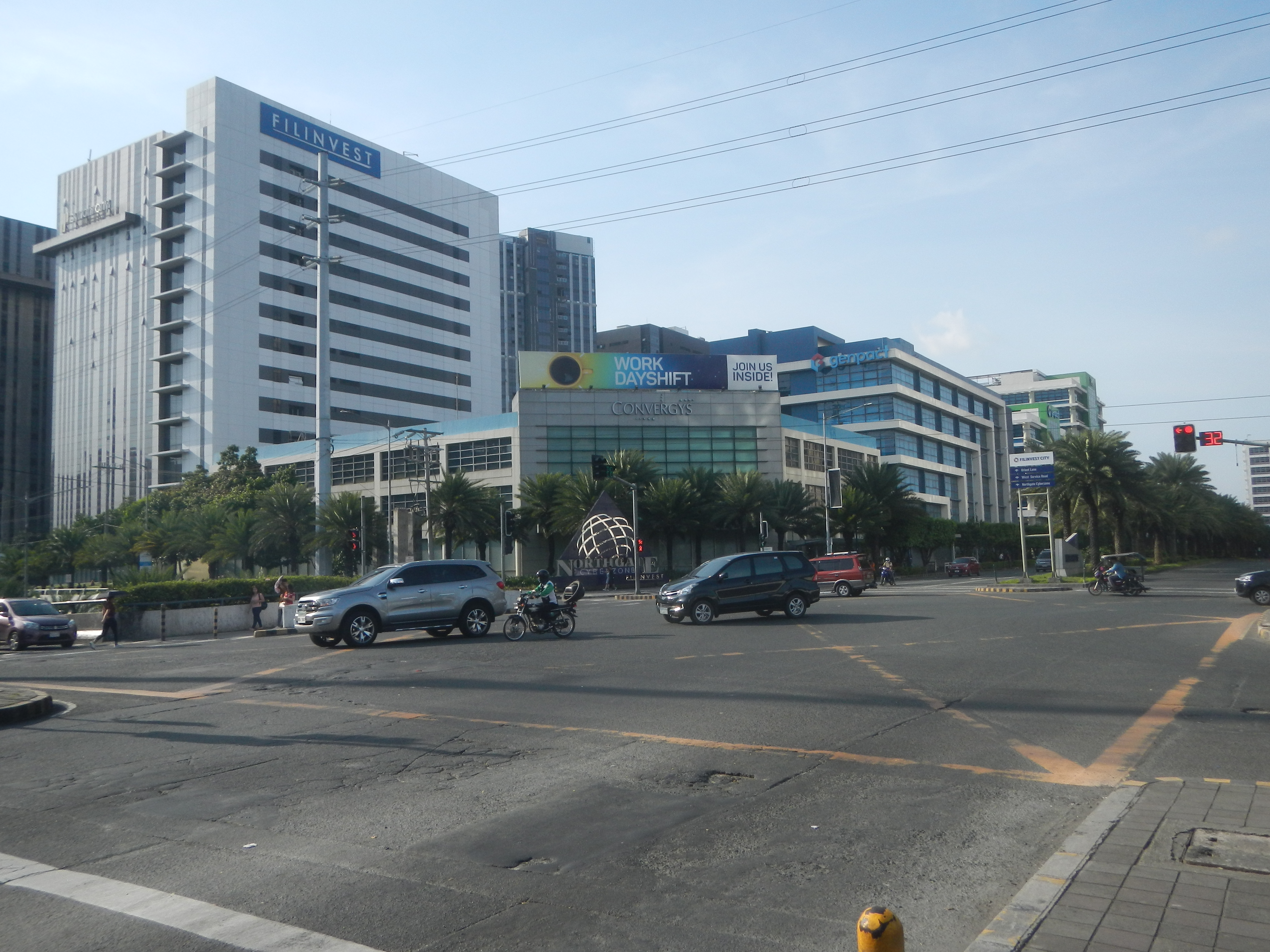
Filinvest Tower at Northgate Cyberzone, Filinvest City in September 2018

=== Banking and finance ===
- EastWest Banking Corporation – is a universal bank in the Philippines known as EastWest Unibank. Its headquarters is at The Beaufort, the flagship luxury condominium project of Filinvest Development Corporation in Bonifacio Global City with extension offices at PBCom Tower Makati (Call Center Division), Hanston Building (Customer Care), and Pasong Tamo Extension (formerly the country head office of Levi's Philippines).
- EastWest Rural Bank, Inc. – or EWRB is a premier rural bank and a wholly owned subsidiary of EastWest Banking Corporation and Filinvest Development Corporation. Established in 2013 when EastWest Banking Corporation acquired FinMan Bank, Inc., a 16-year-old Pasig-based rural bank and Green Bank, Inc. (also known as Green Bank of Caraga), a 46-branch rural bank based in Butuan City. Before its acquisition, it was the largest rural bank in Caraga Region in terms of assets. Its headquarters is located in Pasig.
- EastWest Ageas Life Insurance Corporation
- EastWest Insurance Brokerage, Inc.
- EastWest Leasing and Finance Corporation

=== Utilities ===
- FDC Utilities, Inc. (FDCUI) – a wholly owned subsidiary of the Filinvest Development Corporation.

=== Hospitality ===
Filinvest hotels are managed through subsidiaries Filinvest Hospitality Corporation (formerly FDC Hotels Corporation) and Chroma Hospitality, Inc. (formerly FilArchipelago Hospitality, Inc.), a joint venture with Archipelago International of Indonesia, respectively. The earlier, a wholly owned subsidiary was formed to serve as the primary developer and owners’ representative of Group-owned properties. On the other hand, through Chroma, FDC caters to various segments of the hospitality sector through the 5-star Crimson brand, 3-star Quest brand and Crimson Resort and Spa in Boracay.

=== Real estate ===
- Filinvest Alabang, Inc. (FAI) – was incorporated on August 25, 1993, in connection with the development of the Filinvest City estate in Alabang, a joint venture with the government's Public Estates Authority (now Philippine Retirement Authority) from its previous use as "Alabang Stock Farm". Filinvest City, a 244-hectare mixed-use development project located at the southern end of Metro Manila and adjacent to the South Luzon Expressway in Alabang.
- Filinvest Land, Inc. – the real estate firm subsidiary of FDC. The company is into mall operation, development of subdivisions (Gated community) and both mid and high rise condominiums. It has landbanks in Luzon, Visayas, and Mindanao, aimed at future developments projects of its parent firm.
  - Filinvest Malls
  - The Palms Country Club
- Cyberzone Properties, Inc.
- Filigree: distinguished itself as a high-end brand of properties in the realm of Philippine real estate.

=== Transportation ===
- LIPAD Corporation (operator of Clark International Airport) – a consortium with JG Summit Holdings, Philippine Airport Ground Support Solutions Inc., and Changi Airports Philippines Pte. Ltd.

=== Others ===
- ALG Holdings, Inc.
- Filinvest Asia Corporation
- Davao Sugar Central Corporation
- Pacific Sugar Holdings

== See also ==
- List of companies of the Philippines
- Festival Supermall
