= Tony Moncupa =

Filipino banker, corporate executive, and former political detainee

Antonio C. "Tony" Moncupa Jr. is a Filipino banker, corporate executive, and former political detainee best known for his sixteen year term as CEO of EastWest Bank form 2007 to 2002 during whcih the bank expanded into one of the Philippines' major universal banks, for his term as president Bankers Association of the Philippines (BAP), and for his resistance to Martial law under Ferdinand Marcos, which led to his becoming a political detainee from 1982 to 1984.

The case arising from a petition for habeas corpus filed by Moncupa in 1983, Moncupa v. Enrile (G.R. No. L-63345), is considered a landmark case in Philippine constitutional law jurisprudence. The government had argued that the case was moot because Moncupa had been released with restrictions after filing the case, but the court, deciding in 1986 shortly before the 1986 Snap elections and the People Power Revolution, determined that a person has not necessarily been given personal liberty even if he has been released from jail if still burdened by restrictive conditions.

== See also ==
- Horacio Morales
