= Gaisano Grand Malls =

Shopping mall chain run by the Gaisano Grand Group

- Type: Private
- Industry: Retail
- Founded: 1979; 47 years ago Cebu City, Philippines
- Founder: Benito S. Gaisano
- Headquarters: Cebu City, Philippines
- Number of locations: 46 (2024)
- Area served: Visayas and Mindanao
- Website: gaisanograndmalls.com

Gaisano Grand Malls is a chain of shopping malls under the Philippine-based Gaisano Grand Group of Companies. It operates primarily within the Visayas, Luzon and Mindanao regions of the Philippines.

== History ==
In the 1970s, Modesta Singson Gaisano established White Gold Department Store in Cebu City. After her death in 1981, her five sons—David, Stephen, Henry, Victor, and John—pursued their respective retail operations. Gaisano Grand Malls was founded by Benito S. Gaisano, son of Henry S. Gaisano.

== Branches ==
As of December 2023, there are 46 Gaisano Grand Malls in Visayas and Mindanao, 13 of which are found within the island of Cebu. The Gaisano Grand Group plans to have 50 malls under the Gaisano Grand Malls brand by 2020.

Name	Location	Province	Opening date	Reference
Gaisano Grand Fiesta Mall Tabunok	Tabunok, Talisay City, Cebu	Cebu		
Gaisano Grand Minglanilla	Poblacion Ward II, Minglanilla, Cebu	Cebu		
Gaisano Grand Carcar	Poblacion III, Carcar City, Cebu	Cebu		
Gaisano Grand Toledo	Antonio Y. de Pio Highway, Sangi, Toledo City, Cebu	Cebu		
Gaisano Grand Balamban	Pondol, Balamban, Cebu	Cebu		
Gaisano Grand Cordova	Bangbang, Cordova, Cebu	Cebu		
Gaisano Grand Mactan	Basak-Marigondon Rd cor. Ibabao-Gisi-Agus Rd, Basak, Lapu-Lapu City	Cebu		
Gaisano Grand Mandaue Centro	A. Del Rosario St cor. S.B. Cabahug St, Centro, Mandaue City	Cebu		
Gaisano Grand Talamban	Gov. M. Cuenco Avenue, Talamban, Cebu City	Cebu		
Gaisano Grand Bacolod Mall	Araneta St, Singcang, Bacolod	Negros Occidental		
Gaisano Grand Bacolod Main	Gatuslao St cor. Ballesteros St, Bacolod	Negros Occidental		
Gaisano Grand City Central Bacolod	Locsin St, Barangay 13, Bacolod	Negros Occidental		
Gaisano Grand Kabankalan	Tan Lorenzo St, Barangay 1, Kabankalan City, Negros Occidental	Negros Occidental		
Gaisano Grand City Roxas	Arnaldo Blvd, Tanque, Roxas City, Capiz	Capiz		
Gaisano Grand Marketplace Roxas	San Roque St Ext, Barangay VIII, Roxas City, Capiz	Capiz		
Gaisano Grand Antique	Barangay 8, San Jose de Buenavista, Antique	Antique		
Gaisano Grand Calbayog	Navarro St cor. Orquin St, Central, Calbayog City, Samar	Samar	May 30, 2017	
Gaisano Grand Panabo	Quezon St, Santo Niño, Panabo City, Davao del Norte	Davao del Norte		
Gaisano Grand Dumanjug	Poblacion Central, Dumanjug, Cebu	Cebu	March 1, 2013	
Gaisano Grand Moalboal	Poblacion East, Moalboal, Cebu	Cebu	August 27, 2014	
Gaisano Grand Liloan	Poblacion, Liloan, Cebu	Cebu	December 9, 2015	
Gaisano Grand Toril	McArthur Highway, Toril, Davao City	Davao del Sur	May 11, 2013	
Gaisano Grand Tagum	Apokon Rd, Magugpo East, Tagum City, Davao del Norte	Davao del Norte		
Gaisano Grand Citimall Illustre	Illustre St, Poblacion District, Davao City	Davao del Sur		
Gaisano Grand Citygate Mall	Mandug Rd cor. Buhangin-Cabantian-Indangan Rd, Buhangin, Davao City	Davao del Sur	October 19, 2018	
Gaisano Grand Digos	Zone I, Digos City, Davao del Sur	Davao del Sur	December 9, 2011	
Gaisano Grand Marketplace Digos	Zone II, Digos City, Davao del Sur	Davao del Sur	September 14, 2016	
Gaisano Grand Koronadal	Gen. P. Santos Dr, Koronadal	South Cotabato		
Gaisano Grand Kidapawan	Davao-Cotabato Rd, Lanao, Kidapawan	Cotabato	May 25, 2013	
Gaisano Grand Polomolok	Magsaysay, Polomolok	South Cotabato		
Gaisano Grand Calinan	Davao- Bukidnon Highway, Calinan District, Davao City	Davao del Sur	September 16, 2015	
Gaisano Grand San Francisco	San Francisco	Agusan del Sur	March 14, 2015	
Gaisano Grand Tibungco	Pan-Philippine Highway, Tibungco, Davao City	Davao del Sur		
Gaisano Grand Catarman	Catarman	Northern Samar	November 27, 2015	
Gaisano Grand Jai-Alai	Candido Padilla St, Mambaling, Cebu City	Cebu	December 16, 2015	
Gaisano Grand Nabunturan	Nabunturan	Davao de Oro		
Gaisano Grand Marketplace Bayugan	Bayugan	Agusan del Sur	March 31, 2017	
Gaisano Grand Sara	Poblacion Market, Sara, Iloilo	Iloilo	July 31, 2019	
Gaisano Grand Estancia	A. Reyes Ave, Poblacion Zone II, Estancia, Iloilo	Iloilo	March 29, 2019	
Gaisano Grand Mandaue North	Cebu North Road, Basak, Mandaue City	Cebu		
Gaisano Grand Oslob	Lagunde, Oslob, Cebu	Cebu	December 9, 2020	
Gaisano Grand Plaza Mactan	MEPZ 2, Maximo V. Patalinghug Ave., Basak, Lapu-Lapu City	Cebu	December 9, 2022	
Gaisano Grand Gingoog	Gingoog	Misamis Oriental	November 26, 2021	
Gaisano Grand Kalibo	Kalibo	Aklan	October 15, 2024	
Gaisano Grand Maasin	Maasin	Southern Leyte	May 16, 2024	
Gaisano Grand Ipil	Barangay Veterans Village, Ipil	Zamboanga Sibugay	December 5, 2023	
Gaisano Grand Silay	Rizal St, Mambulak, Silay	Negros Occidental		
Gaisano Grand Dipolog	Dipolog-Zamboanga Highway, Sta. Filomena, Dipolog City	Zamboanga del Norte	Under Construction	
Gaisano Grand Argao	Poblacion, Argao, Cebu	Cebu	March 20, 2026	
Gaisano Grand Lopez	Lopez, Quezon	Quezon	Planned	
Gaisano Grand Bad-as	Bad-as, Placer	Surigao del Norte	Under Construction	
Gaisano Grand Cabadbaran	Cabadbaran	Agusan del Norte	Under Construction	
Gaisano Grand Carmen	Davao-Agusan National Highway, Carmen	Davao del Norte	November 27, 2025	
Gaisano Grand Hinigaran	Hinigaran,	Negros Occidental	Planned	

Defunct Branches

Name	Location	Opening date	Closing date
Gaisano Cubao	General Romulo St., Araneta Center, Cubao, Quezon City	1990s	2000s

== See also ==
- Ayala Malls
- Gaisano family
- SM Supermalls
- Gaisano Malls
