= Metro Retail Stores Group =

Filipino retail company

- Formerly: Metro Gaisano
- Type: Public
- Traded as: PSE: MRSGI
- Industry: Retail
- Predecessor: White Gold Department Store
- Founded: 1982 in Cebu, Philippines
- Founders: Victor Gaisano; Sally Gaisano
- Headquarters: Mandaue, Cebu, Philippines
- Number of locations: 46 stores (2015)
- Areas served: Philippines
- Key people: Frank S. Gaisano (Chairman and CEO); Jack S. Gaisano (President and COO)
- Number of employees: 9,000 (2015)
- Parent: Vicsal Development Corporation
- Website: shopmetro.ph

Metro Retail Stores Group Inc. (stylized as METRO Retail Stores Group Inc., shortly known as Metro Retail or Metro) is a retail company based in Mandaue, Cebu, Philippines.

According to a 2014 report by Euromonitor, Metro is the largest operator of department stores and hypermarkets in the Visayas region, as well as the second largest supermarket operator according to retail sales value.

== History ==
In 1949, Modesta Gaisano, together with her five sons, established White Gold Department Store. After the death of Gaisano in 1981, her sons pursued their respective business interests.

In 1982, Victor and Sally Gaisano—together with their children, Margaret, Jack, Edward and Frank—established the Metro Gaisano Department Store and Supermarket.

Metro Retail later expanded to major cities outside Cebu. Metro stores also opened stores in key cities in Central, Western and Eastern Visayas, as well as in Central Luzon, Metro Manila and South Luzon.

The company's expansion in Metro Manila in particular was marked by the opening of Market! Market! in the early 2000s.

Metro was listed on the Philippine Stock Exchange on November 25, 2015.

== Store formats and locations ==
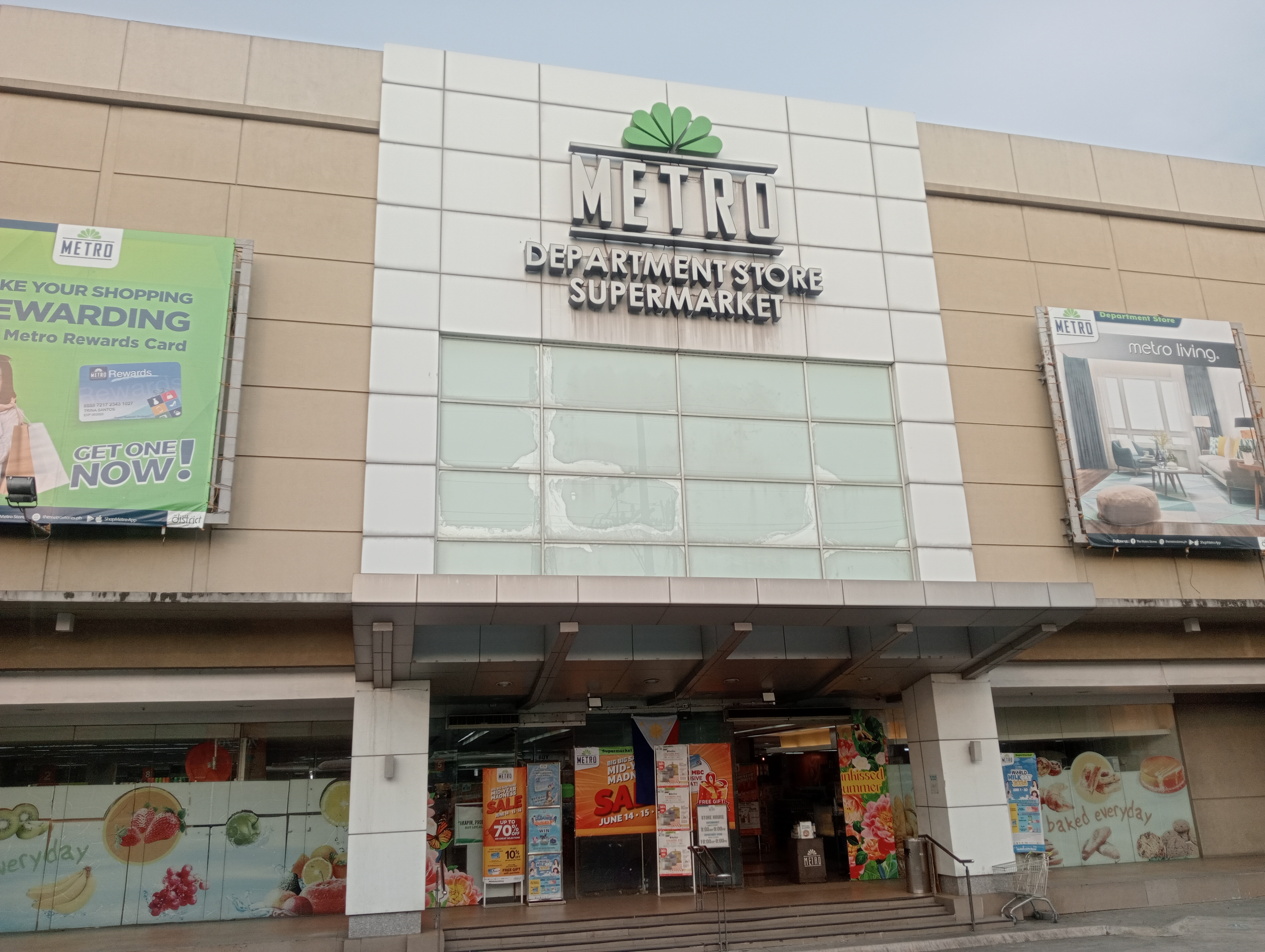
Metro Imus, The District Imus, Imus, Cavite

Metro Retail Stores follows the following retail store formats: Metro Department Store, Metro Supermarket, Super Metro Hypermarket and Metro Fresh n’ Easy Neighborhood Store.

As of November 2015, Metro Retail operates 46 stores across the Philippines specifically in the Visayas, Central Luzon, Metro Manila, Calabarzon and Bicol regions. It is planned to open a store in Mindanao by 2017.

Name	Location	Date opened	Notes
Metro Colon	Colon St., Cebu City	1982	-
Metro - Ayala Center Cebu	Cebu Business Park, Archbishop Reyes Avenue cor. Cardinal Rosales Avenue, Brgy. Luz, Cebu City	1994	-
Metro - Pacific Mall Mandaue	M.C. Briones St. cor. U.N. Avenue, Ibabao Estancia, Mandaue City, Cebu	1995	Formerly Super Metro Mandaue. Relaunched as an anchor store of Pacific Mall Mandaue on June 30, 2011.
Metro - Pacific Mall Legazpi	Landco Business Park, F. Imperial St., Legazpi Port District, Legazpi City, Albay	November 2001	-
Metro - Pacific Mall Lucena	M.L. Tagarao St., Lucena City, Quezon	October 18, 2003	-
Metro - Market! Market!	Bonifacio Global City, Taguig, Metro Manila	2004	First Metro branch in Metro Manila
Metro - Marquee Mall	Francisco G. Nepomuceno Ave., Angeles, Pampanga	2009	-
Metro - Alabang Town Center	Alabang-Zapote Rd., Ayala Alabang, Muntinlupa, Metro Manila	August 19, 2012	
Metro - The District Imus	Emilio Aguinaldo Highway, Imus, Cavite	-	-
Metro - Ayala Malls Feliz	J. P. Rizal St., Marikina-Infanta Highway, Pasig, Metro Manila	February 20, 2019	-
Metro - Ayala Malls Capitol Central	Gatuslao St., Bacolod, Negros Occidental	April 9, 2019	-
Metro Baybay	Brgy. Zone 15, Poblacion District, Baybay City, Leyte	July 30, 2019	-
Metro Tacloban	Real St. cor. Perichon St., Tacloban City, Leyte	November 20, 2020	-
Metro Danao	Danao City	February 7, 2021	-
Metro Catbalogan	San Francisco Street, Brgy. Guindaponan, Catbalogan, Samar	October 4, 2024	First Metro branch in Samar Island

== Ancillary businesses ==
Business	Type	Ref
Food Avenue	Food dining outlet	
Suisse Cottage	Bakeshop	
Metro Gourmet	Gourmet food shop / dining outlet	
Metro Pharmacy	Pharmacy	
