= Gaisano Malls =

Shopping mall chain ran by the DSG Group

- Founded: January 5, 1972; 54 years ago J.P. Laurel Avenue, Davao City, Philippines
- Headquarters: J.P. Laurel Avenue, Davao City, Philippines
- Number of locations: 6 (as of 2026)
- Area served: Mindanao and Cebu, Philippines
- Owner: DSG Sons Group, Inc.
- Website: www.gaisanomalls.com

Gaisano Malls (also branded as GMall) are shopping malls owned by DSG Sons Group, Inc. based in Davao City, Mindanao, Philippines.

== History ==
In 1933, Modesta Singson-Gaisano established White Gold Department, Store in Cebu City. After her death in 1981, her five sons—David, Stephen, Henry, Victor and John—pursued their respective retail operations.

Her son, David S. Gaisano, took over the operations of White Gold. In addition, he established DSG Sons Group, Inc. which opened shopping malls in Mindanao under the Gaisano Mall and GMall brands in Davao City (including Toril), Digos, General Santos, Tagum, and Cebu City. GMall's Mindanao branches are some of the biggest shopping malls in the island.

== Branches ==
As of 2026, GMall has six (6) branches, five (5) of which are located in Mindanao, as well as one (1) in Cebu which was rebranded from White Gold Club to GMall Cebu.

=== GMall Branches ===
Name	Location	Opening Date	Theme	Total Floor Area	Remarks
Gaisano Mall of GenSan	Jose Catolico Sr. Ave, General Santos City	1988	Tuna	90,000 m2	First Gaisano Mall in General Santos and in South Cotabato, and the First Gaisano Mall. Half of said mall was destroyed by fire and is currently under reconstruction.
Gaisano Mall of Davao	J.P. Laurel Ave, Bajada, Davao City	April 20, 1997	Eagle	240,600 m2	First Gaisano Mall in Davao City, First in Davao del Sur, the Second Gaisano Mall, and also, the Largest Mall.
Gaisano Mall of Tagum	Briz District, Tagum City, Davao del Norte	November 11, 2011	Palm	103,500 m2 (including 2018 expansion)	First Gaisano Mall in Tagum, First in Davao del Norte, and the Third Gaisano Mall.
Gaisano Mall of Toril	Lim St, Toril, Davao City	May 11, 2013	Mount Apo	108,000 m2	First Gaisano Mall in Toril, Second in Davao del Sur, and the Fourth Gaisano Mall.
Gaisano Mall of Digos	Digos City, Davao del Sur	November 11, 2015	Mango	85,000 m2	First Gaisano Mall in Digos, Third in Davao del Sur, and the Fifth Gaisano Mall.
Gaisano Mall of Cebu	A. Soriano Ave, North Reclamation Area, Cebu City	December 1, 2022	Sinulog	200,000 m2	Formerly White Gold Club (in which the mall was sitting in). First Gaisano Mall in Cebu, First outside Mindanao, First in Visayas, and the Sixth Gaisano Mall.

=== Gaisano Center Branches ===
Name	Location	Opening Date	Status
Gaisano Center Tagum	Pioneer Ave, Tagum, Davao del Norte	-	Formerly known as Gaisano Tagum. The old branding remains attached to their facade.
Gaisano Center Digos	Estrada St, Digos City, Davao del Sur	-	Formerly known as Gaisano Digos. The old branding remains attached to their facade.
Gaisano Center Azuela Cove	Azuela Cove, Agdao, Davao City	September 8, 2021	-

=== Upcoming Gaisano Center Branches ===
Name	Location	Opening Date	Status
Gaisano Center Davao	Bolton St, corner Bonifacio St, Poblacion District, Davao City	-	Formerly known as Gaisano Center and was closed down in the late 2000s. As of 2021, the branch is said to be renovated and is currently fenced.

=== Gaisano Mall of Las Piñas ===
Gaisano Mall of Las Piñas is a proposed mall that was supposed to take construction in the fourth quarter of 1997. However, the location of the proposed mall is unknown. This was a proposed initiative for the entry of the Gaisano Mall brand in Metro Manila and Luzon. The cause of the project's cancellation hasn't been disclosed to this day.
