= Landmark (department store) =

Department store and supermarket chain in the Philippines

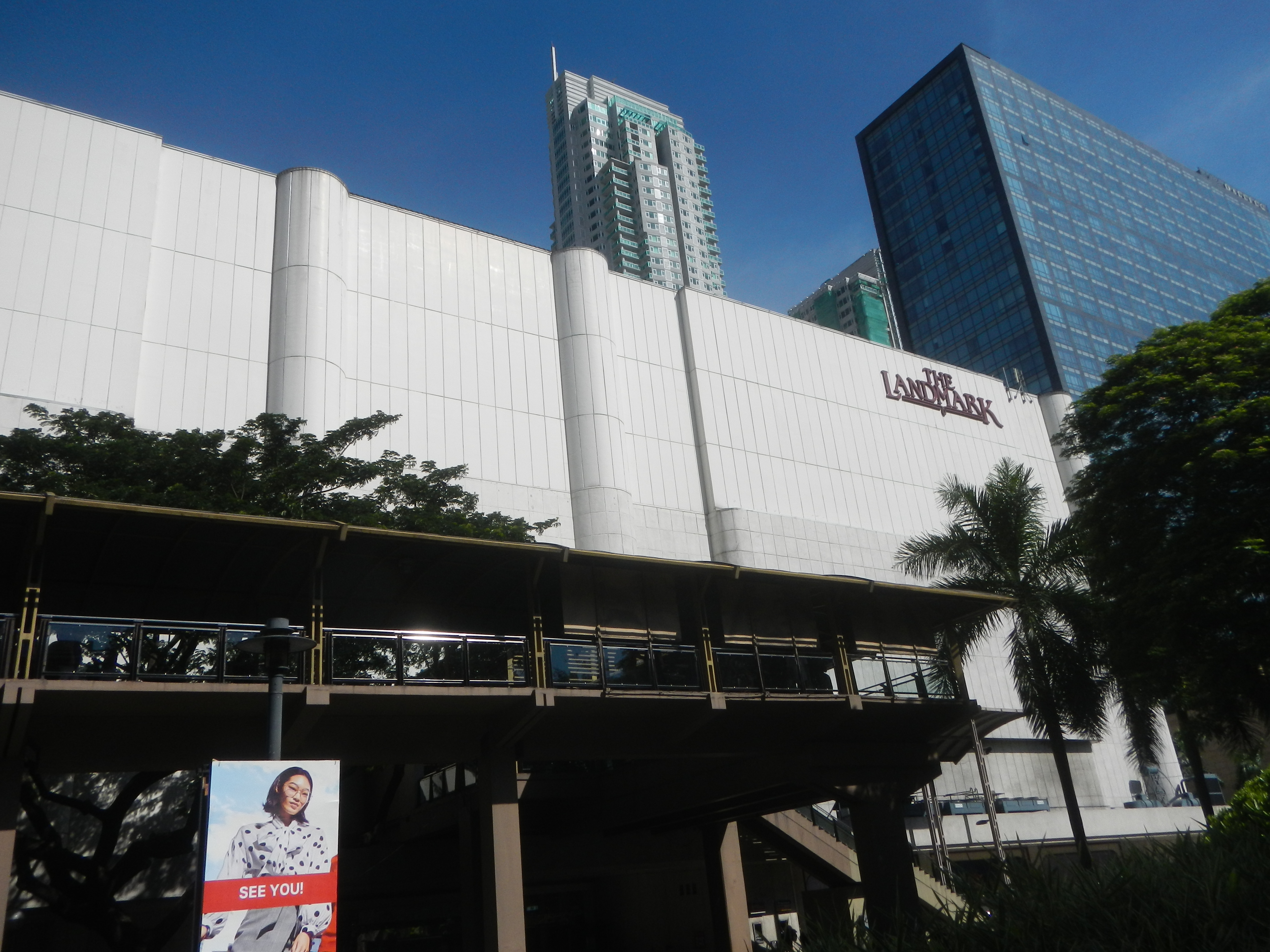
- Landmark Makati
- Product type: Department store and Supermarket chain
- Current owner: The Landmark Corporation and Citysuper Inc.
- Country: Philippines
- Introduced: 1988
- Markets: Metro Manila and Laguna
- Tagline: Living it up for you Where everyday shopping is a pleasure
- Website: landmark.ph - Supermarket; landmarkstore.com.ph - Department Store

Landmark (formerly known as The Landmark) is a Filipino department store and supermarket chain run by Citysuper Incorporated, the holding company of the Landmark Corporation, owned by Reynaliza Mariño. It currently has multiple operational department stores and supermarkets across Metro Manila and one provincial branch located in Santa Rosa, Laguna.

== History ==
The Landmark opened in 1988 in Makati Commercial Center (present-day Ayala Center), Makati. It was founded by Teddy Keng, the son of the founders of Anson's Emporium (now Anson's), whose second store was located at Arnaiz Avenue south of the edifice. It stands on the ruins of the Coronado Lanes and Maranaw Arcade, the latter of which was destroyed by a fire in 1985 alongside Makati Supermart (which is now occupied by the present-day Glorietta 2) and demolished soon after. The Makati flagship branch was the third department store established within the Ayala Center after SM Makati and Rustan's, and is known for having some items lower priced than most department stores in Metro Manila. The Makati branch was redeveloped in 2013 with the addition of two additional floors and Mary Mother of Hope Chapel, a Roman Catholic chapel. The chapel's name was given by then-Archbishop of Manila, Cardinal Luis Antonio Tagle, who entrusted the chaplaincy to Rev. Fr. Rufino Sescon, who would later become Bishop of Balanga.

In 2007, the Landmark's second branch at TriNoma was opened to the public. This underwent expansion in 2015, thus becoming the largest Landmark branch ever built. The third floor of the expansion was opened to public on September 8, 2017, coinciding with the inauguration of Landmark's second chapel, which is the namesake of the first chapel in Makati, at the fourth level.

In 2014, Landmark was selected to become the anchor store for Festival Alabang expansion and redevelopment in Filinvest City, Muntinlupa. The supermarket opened on July 28, 2017, followed by the department store on October 6, 2017. It is the first branch of Landmark to be opened in southern Metro Manila.

In 2019, The Landmark opened its first-ever provincial branch at Ayala Malls Solenad (now Ayala Malls Nuvali) in Nuvali, Santa Rosa, Laguna.

The fifth Landmark branch, located in Bonifacio Global City, opened on October 1, 2021, with only the supermarket. Located at first two levels of Three Parkade parking building, it is the company's smallest store. The department store on the upper level later opened in December 2021.

On May 24, 2026, Landmark's third chapel at the Manila Bay branch was opened, with a solemn blessing and Mass led by Bishop Jesse Mercado of the Diocese of Parañaque; among the concelebrants is Balanga Bishop Rufino Sescon, who was the first chaplain of the Mary Mother of Hope Chapel in Makati.

== Branches ==
Name	Image	Opening Date	Location
Landmark Makati		1988	Makati Avenue, Ayala Center, Makati
Landmark TriNoma		May 2007 (Supermarket); October 2007 (Department Store)	TriNoma, Epifanio delos Santos Avenue cor. Mindanao Avenue Extension, Quezon City
Landmark Alabang		July 28, 2017	Festival Alabang Expansion, Civic Drive, Filinvest City, Alabang, Muntinlupa
Landmark Nuvali		July 31, 2019	Nuvali 3 Building A, Ayala Malls Nuvali, Santa Rosa, Laguna
Landmark Bonifacio Global City		October 1, 2021	Ground & 2nd Levels, Three Parkade, 30th Street cor. Lane A, Bonifacio Global City, Taguig
Landmark Manila Bay		October 25, 2024 (Supermarket & Food Center); December 1, 2024 (Department Store)	Building A, Ayala Malls Manila Bay, Aseana Avenue cor. Macapagal Boulevard, Aseana City, Parañaque

== Features ==
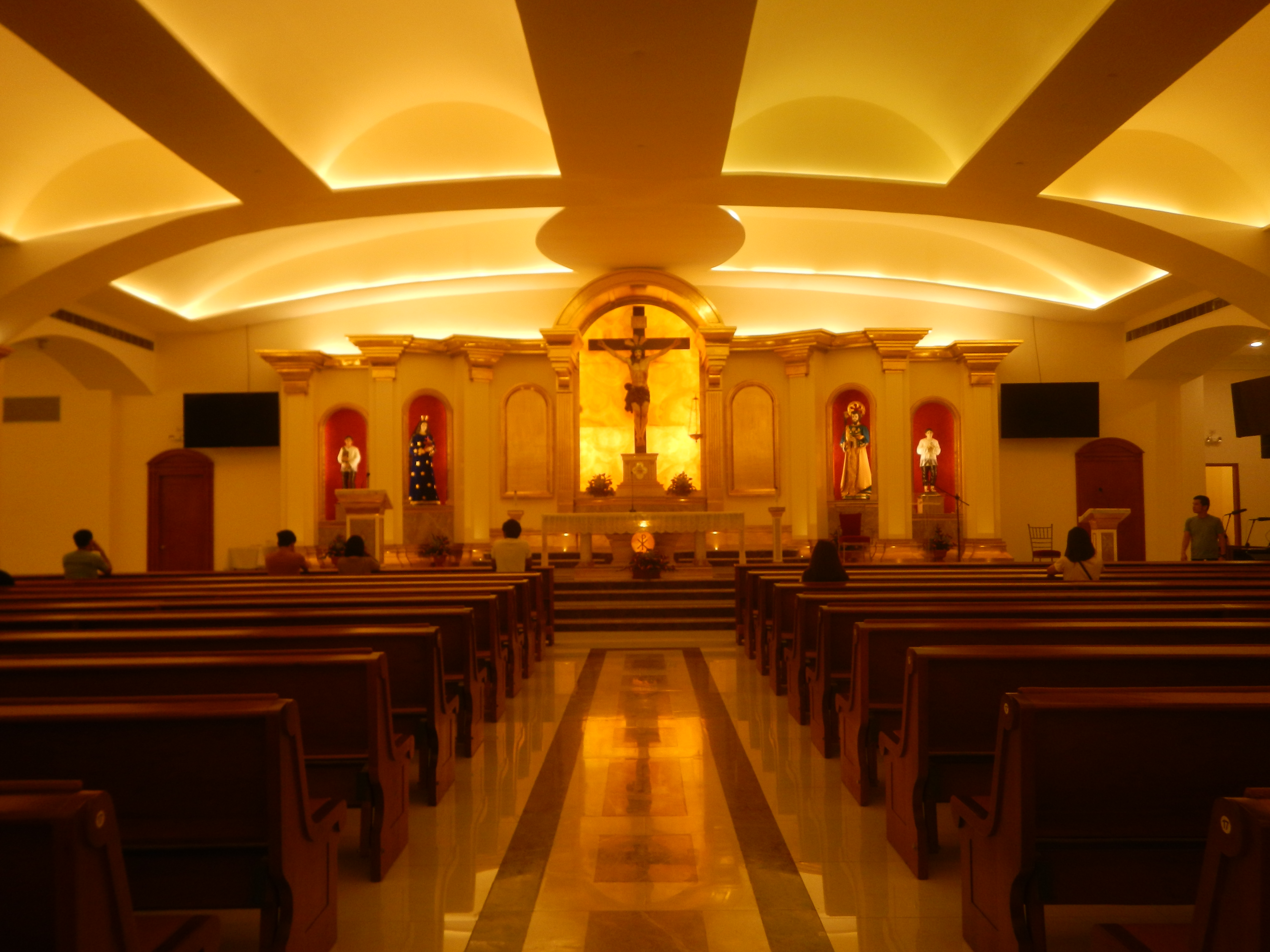
Mary Mother of Hope Chapel at Landmark TriNoma

Landmark is a multi-format retail destination integrating a Landmark Department Store, Landmark Supermarket, and Landmark Food Center (a food court) within a single complex; however, the Bonifacio Global City branch does not include the Food Center. Except for the flagship Makati branch, Landmark serves as an anchor tenant for various shopping malls.

Another feature of Landmark is a Roman Catholic chapel, known as the Mary Mother of Hope Chapel and colloquially as Landmark Chapel. In addition to the main sanctuary, the chapel includes an adoration chapel, an administrative office, and a glass-partitioned Children's Room. These chapels are located at the Makati, TriNona, and Manila Bay branches. The Makati chapel is specifically designated as a mission station under the Archdiocese of Manila. The TriNoma chapel has a seating capacity of 2,200, which is the largest of its kind in Metro Manila.

== See also ==
- Ayala Center
- TriNoma
- Festival Alabang
