= The Triumph of Science over Death =

Clay sculpture by José Rizal

- Scientia (Latin)
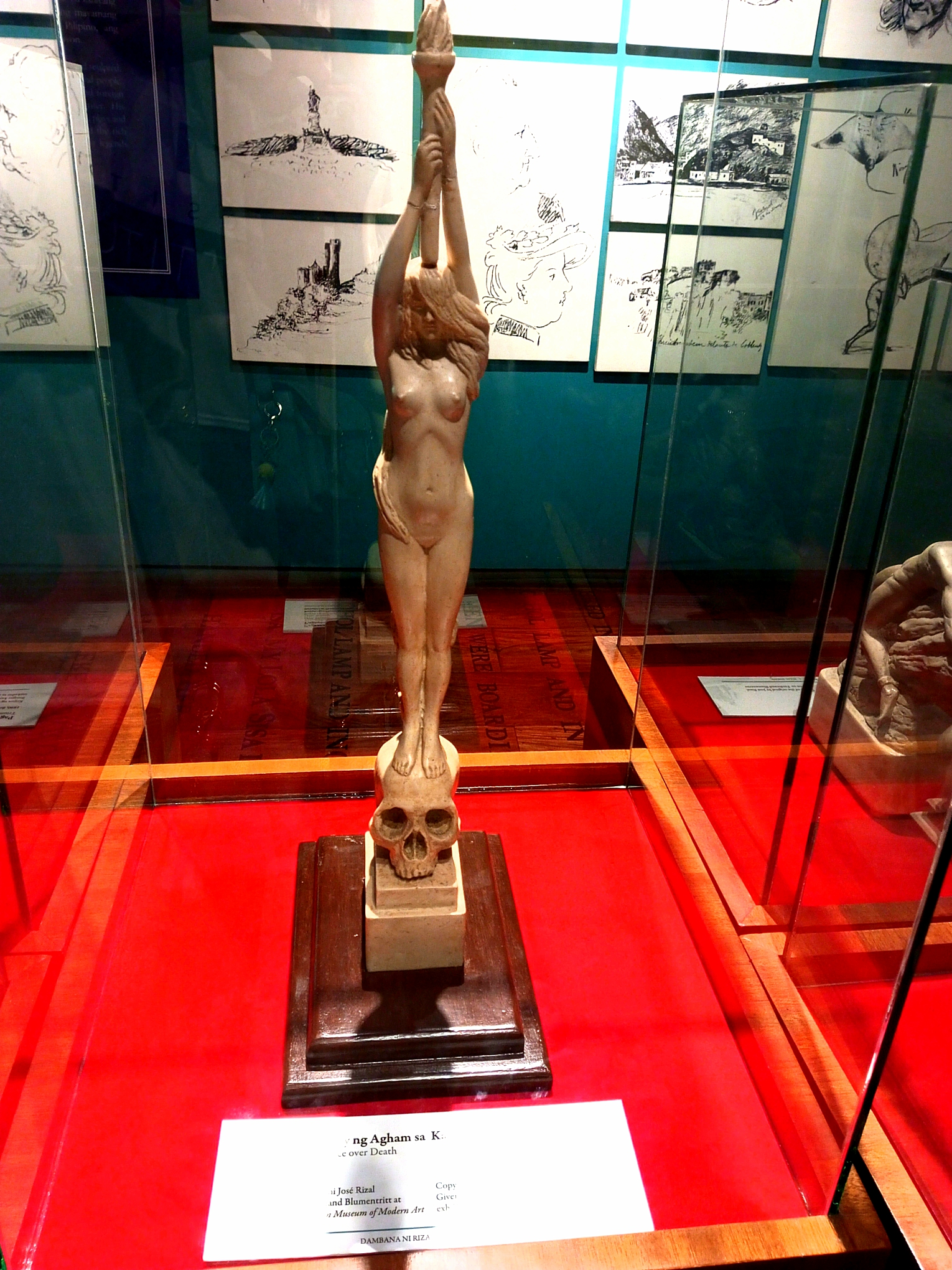
- Copy of the original sculpture on display at Rizal Shrine Museum in September 2024

- Location within Manila Location within Metro Manila Location within Luzon Location within Philippines
- Artist: José Rizal
- Year: 1890
- Type: Sculpture
- Medium: Clay
- Location: Rizal Shrine Museum, Manila; 14°35′40″N 120°58′11″E

The Triumph of Science over Death, also known as Scientia, is a clay sculpture made by José Rizal as a gift to his friend Ferdinand Blumentritt.

The statue depicts a young, nude woman with flowing hair, standing on a skull while bearing a torch. The torch she bears symbolizes the enlightenment science brings to the world. The woman stands atop a skull, a symbol of death, to signify the victory that humankind aims to achieve by conquering the bane of death through scientific advancement.

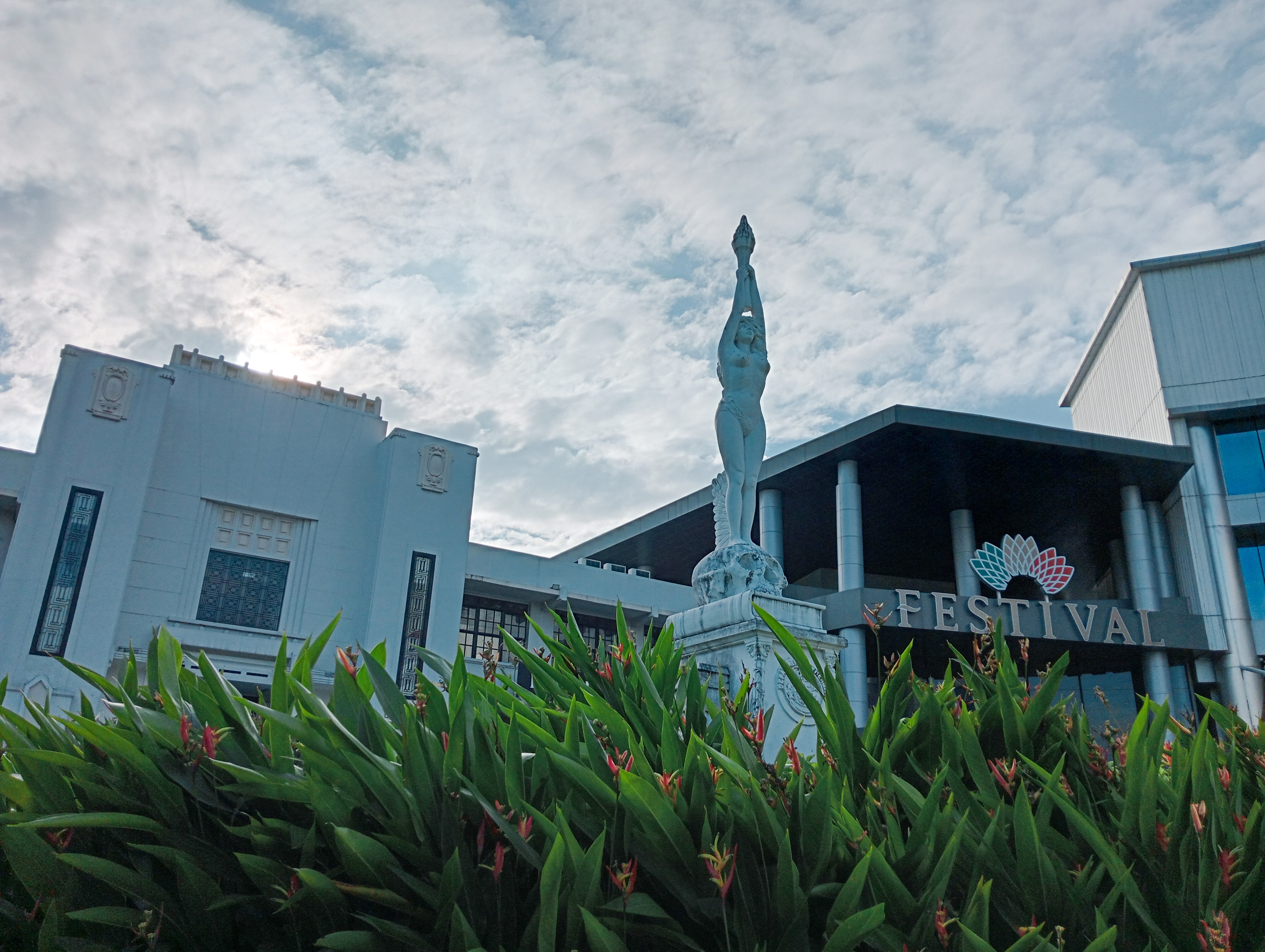
A replica of the sculpture in Alabang, Muntinlupa

The original sculpture is now displayed at the Rizal Shrine Museum at Fort Santiago in Intramuros, Manila. A large replica, made of concrete, stands in front of the Fernando Calderón Hall, which houses the University of the Philippines College of Medicine, inside the University of the Philippines Manila campus in Ermita, Manila. Another replica is found outside the old Department of Health's Biological Production Service (BPS) research facility in Muntinlupa and is sculpted by Genaro Sy-Changco. The facility is now incorporated into the expanded Festival Alabang.

The motif of the statue is also used by various medical associations in the Philippines as their symbol, the most notable of which is the Philippine College of Surgeons. (Note: As depicted on the logo of Philippine College of Surgeons seen on their official newsletter)

== See also ==
- Women in Philippine art
