= Festival Alabang =

Shopping mall in the Philippines

Festival Mall

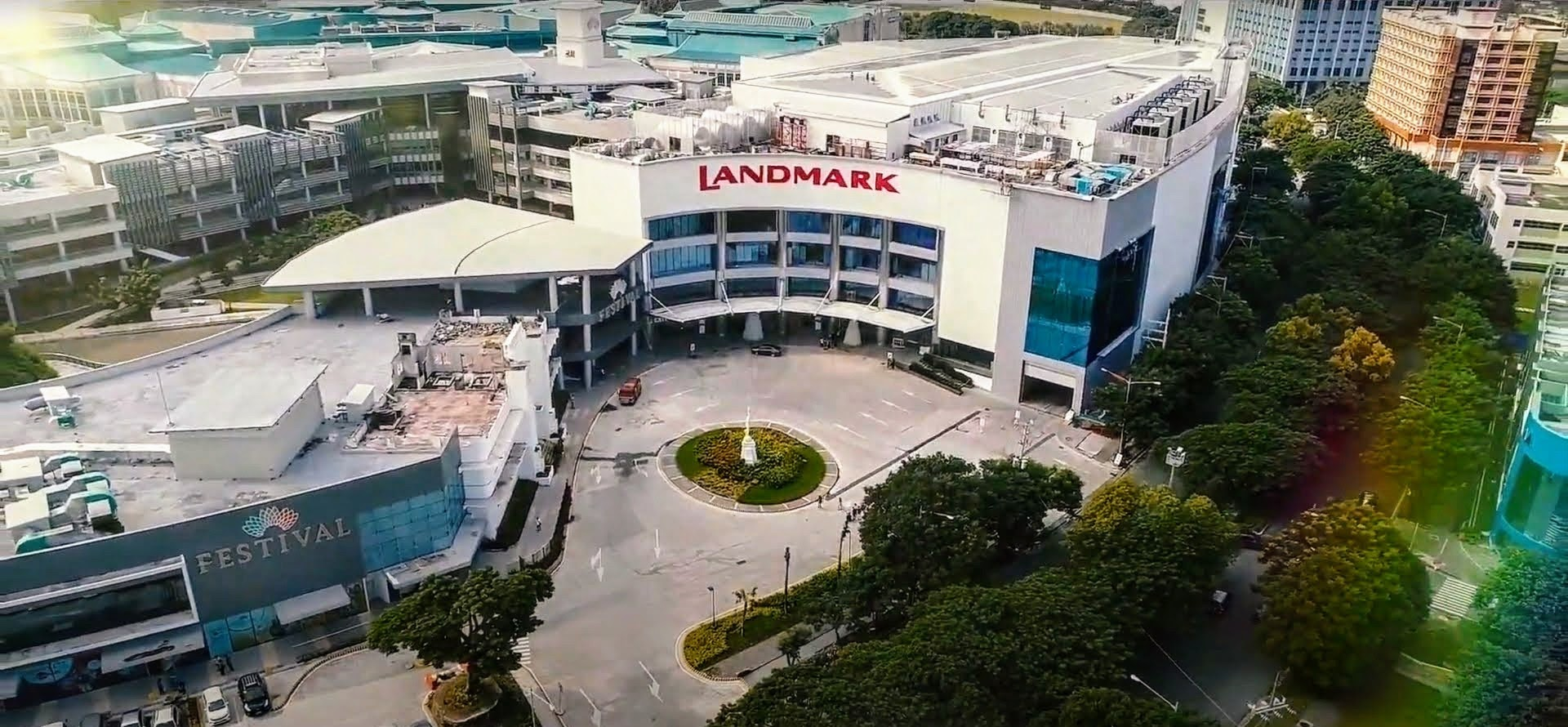
- Drone shot of Festival Alabang with Landmark Alabang
- Location: Alabang, Muntinlupa, Philippines
- Coordinates: 14.4157°N 121.0389°E
- Address: Corporate Avenue, Filinvest City
- Opened: May 15, 1998; 28 years ago
- Developer: Filinvest Development Corporation
- Manager: Filinvest Development Corporation
- Num. of stores: Over 1,000
- Num. of anchor tenants: 6
- Floor area: GFA: 400,000 m^{2} (4,300,000 sq ft): UFA: 340,000 m^{2} (3,700,000 sq ft); LM: 60,000 m^{2} (650,000 sq ft)
- Floors: 4 upper + 1 basement
- Parking: More than 4,000 slots
- Public transit: Alabang (Note: Closed since March 2024.); 10 24 South Station; OCA Premium P2P
- Website: festivalmall.com

Festival Alabang (also known as Festival Mall, formerly known as Festival Supermall, and colloquially known as Festi), is a large shopping mall owned and operated by Filinvest Land, Inc. It is located at Filinvest City (formerly Filinvest Corporate City) in Alabang, Muntinlupa, the Philippines. It opened on May 15, 1998. The mall has a gross floor area of 400,000 square meters (4,300,000 sq ft), gross leasable area of 170,000 square meters (1,800,000 sq ft), and is the fifth largest mall in the Philippines. (Note: Tying with Ayala Malls Manila Bay.)

In the first quarter of 2014, the mall completed the initial phase of its upgrading and rebranding efforts that began in 2013. Called the River Park, this initial phase is part of Festival's four-level expansion to keep up with the current growth in the country's retail industry.

== Features ==
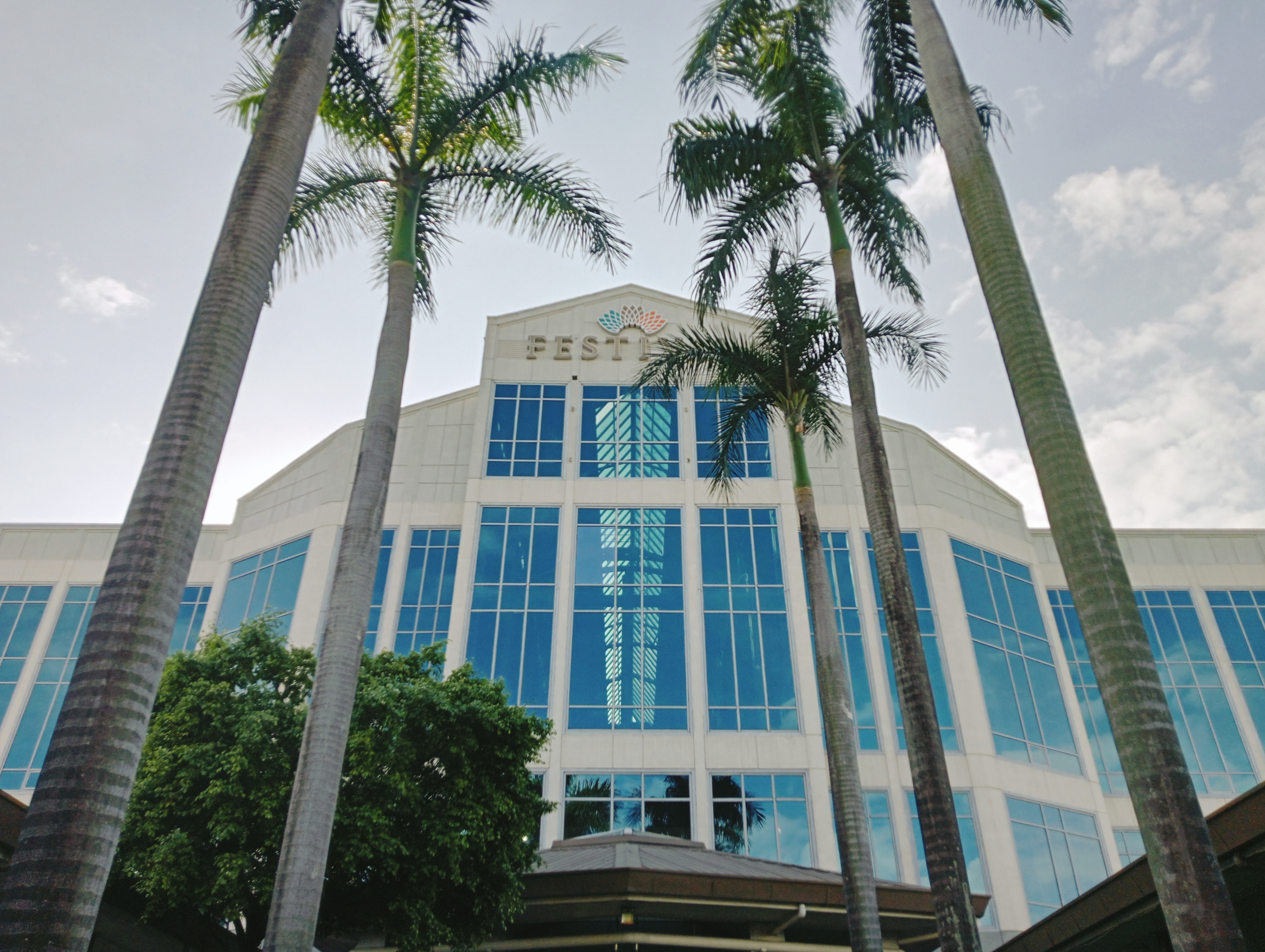
Mall façade

Festival Alabang is divided into the West Wing (main mall opened in 1998) and the East Wing (expansion opened in 2017), as well as the River Park detached from the mall building. The mall features two indoor amusement centers, X-Site and Pixie Forest, as well as in-mall amusement rides such as Festival Grand Carousel, The Festival Grand Station, and Kiddo Driving School, all located in the West Wing. It currently features two Gold Class Cinemas in the East Wing, while ten original regular Cinemas in the West Wing are inactive since 2024. Additionally, it has seven anchor stores such as Robinsons Department Store, Handyman, Ace Hardware, Savemore Market, Shopwise, Automatic Centre and Landmark.

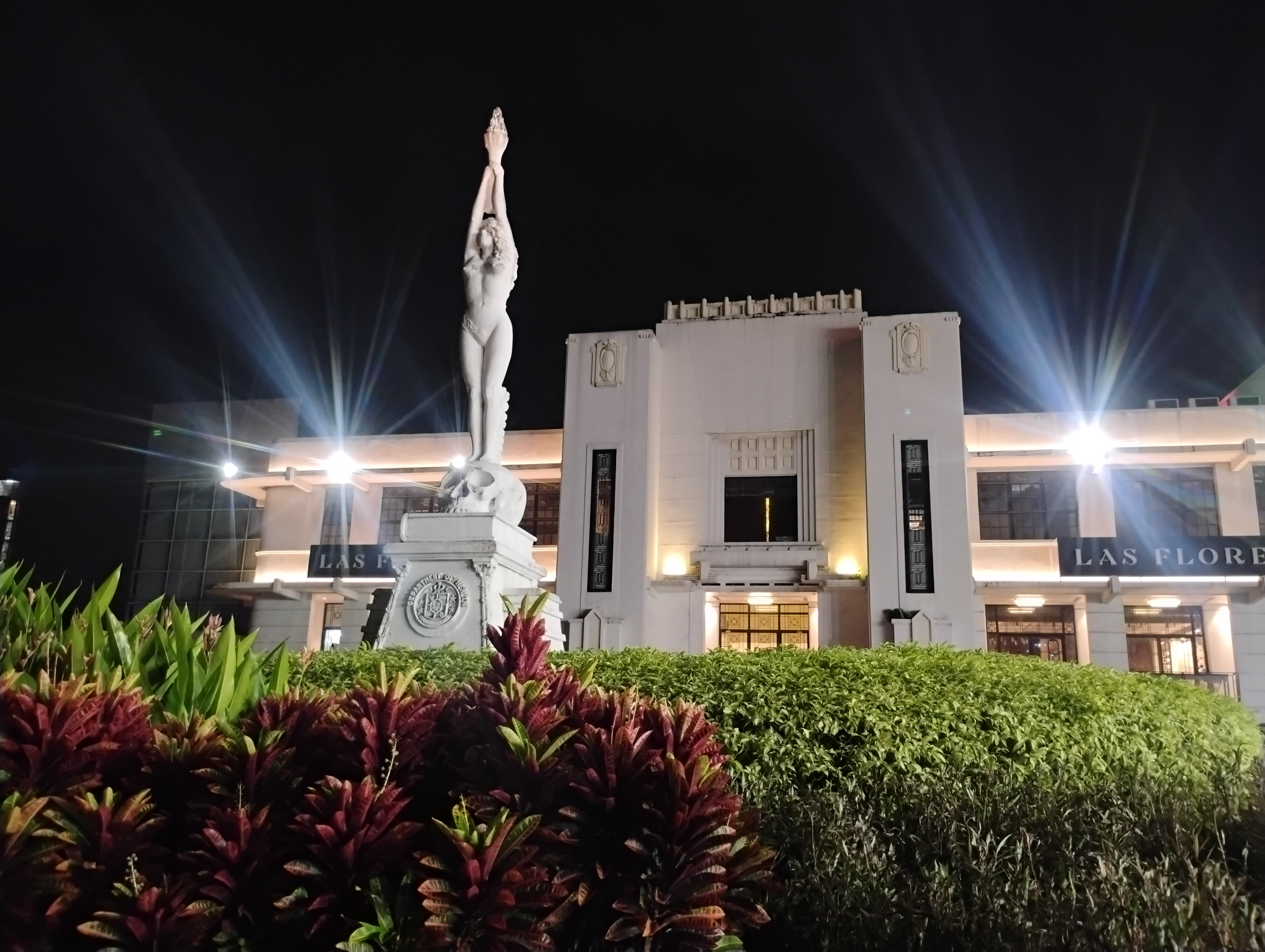
The DOH Biological Production Service Building, now Las Flores, and The Triumph of Science over Death

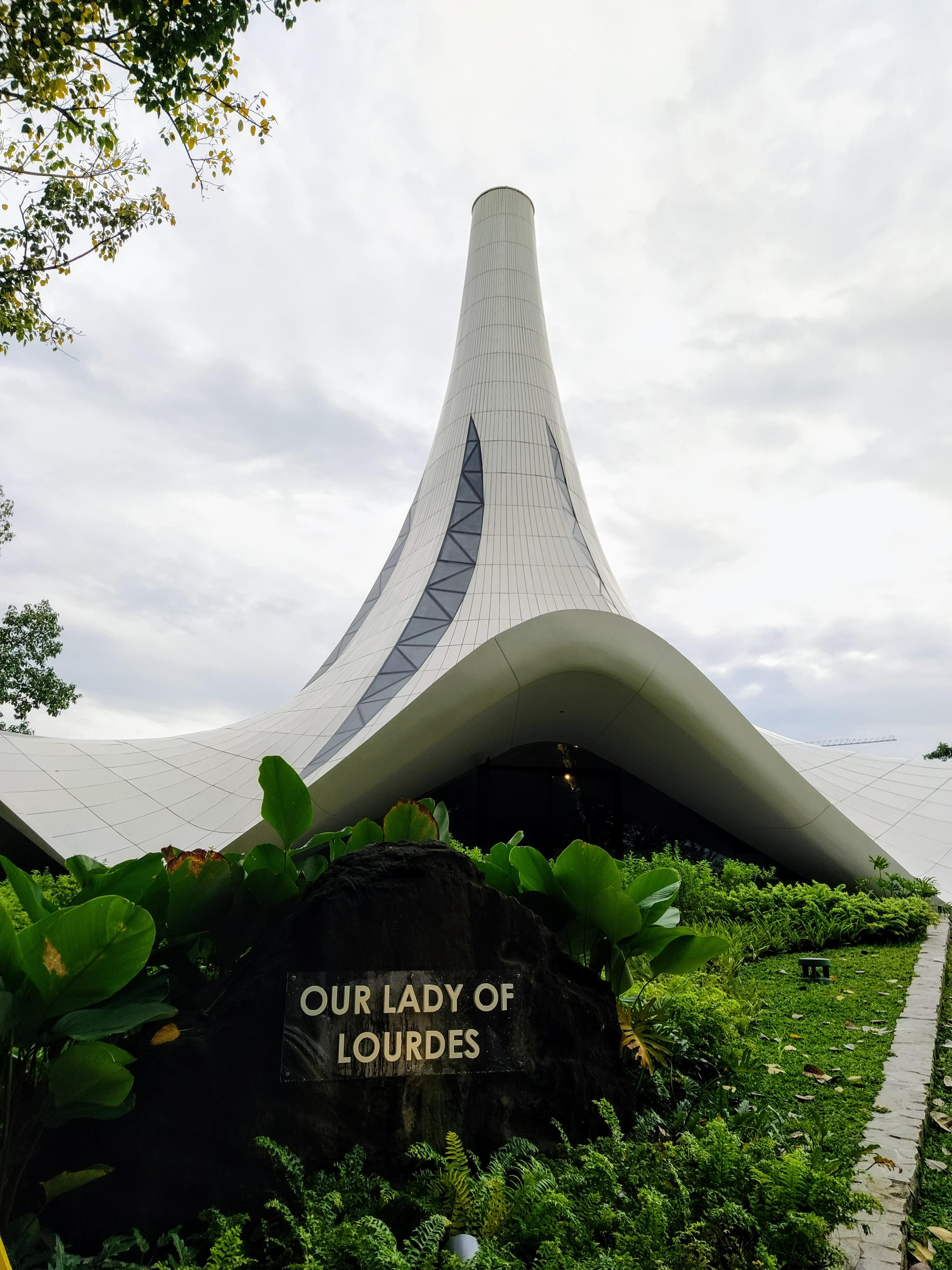
Our Lady of Lourdes Chapel

An Art Deco building of Department of Health's Biological Production Service (BPS) research unit, built in 1924, was restored and incorporated into the mall in 2009, adjacent to the ruins is a replica statue of José Rizal's The Triumph of Science over Death clay sculpture, sculpted by Genaro Sy-Changco.

=== East Wing ===
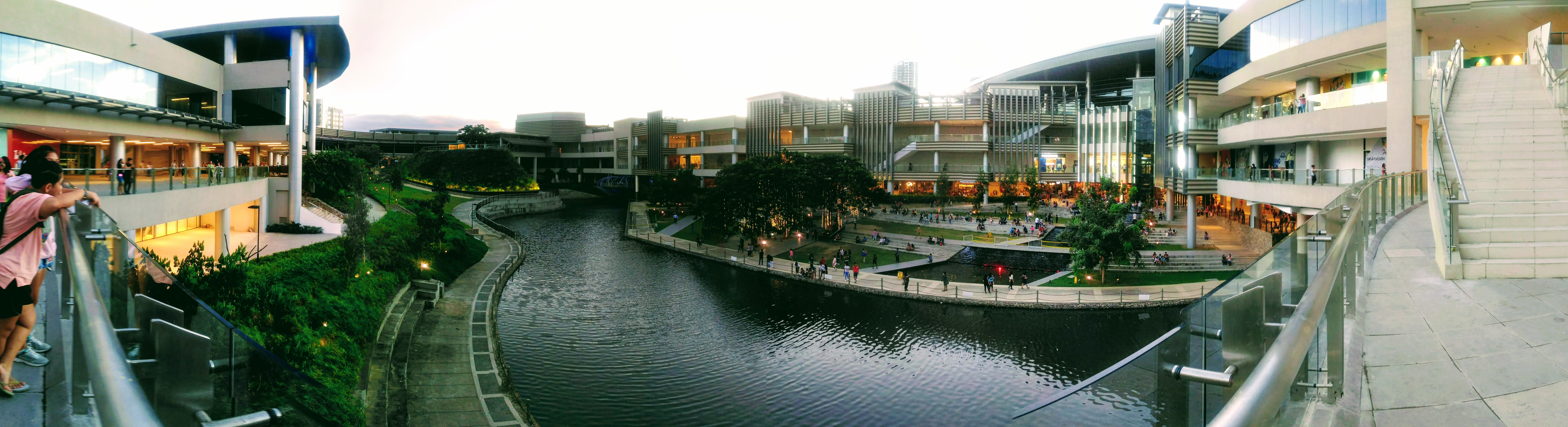
Panorama of the Water Garden in 2017

The East Wing (formerly the Expansion Wing), as well as the Water Garden, opened in 2017. The Landmark Alabang opened on July 28, 2017, initially with its supermarket and food center, followed by its department store on October 6, 2017. The Gold Class Cinemas (2 cinemas) opened on July 25, 2018, on the third floor of the East Wing, with each gold class theater having a 186-seating capacity.

Since 2025, the East Wing is the location of the NCR South consular and passport office of the Department of Foreign Affairs, having moved from Alabang Town Center.

=== River Park ===
The River Park, which was completed in 2014, is part of the many upgrading efforts of the mall. It includes a boardwalk, restaurants, bike paths, shops, and a Marian Chapel which opened in 2022, named Our Lady of Lourdes Chapel.

==== Our Lady of Lourdes Chapel ====
A Marian chapel at the top of the River Park's hill gardens was formally unveiled to the public in October 2022. Designed by Tokyo-based architect Hiroshi Nakamura in collaboration with NAP Architects, Our Lady of Lourdes Chapel resembles an inverted white lily as an homage to the Virgin Mary, topped by a 98-foot-high (30 m) central spire and can accommodate 300 seats. Its ceiling and roof were shaped like segmented petals decorated with stained glass windows designed by British artist Helen Whittaker, who also installed the David Hockney-designed Queen Elizabeth II Window at Westminster Abbey. The life-sized altar centerpiece was created by Filipino sculptor Daniel Dela Cruz. It holds Mass every Saturdays and Sundays and is open to the public daily during mall hours.

== Notable tenants ==
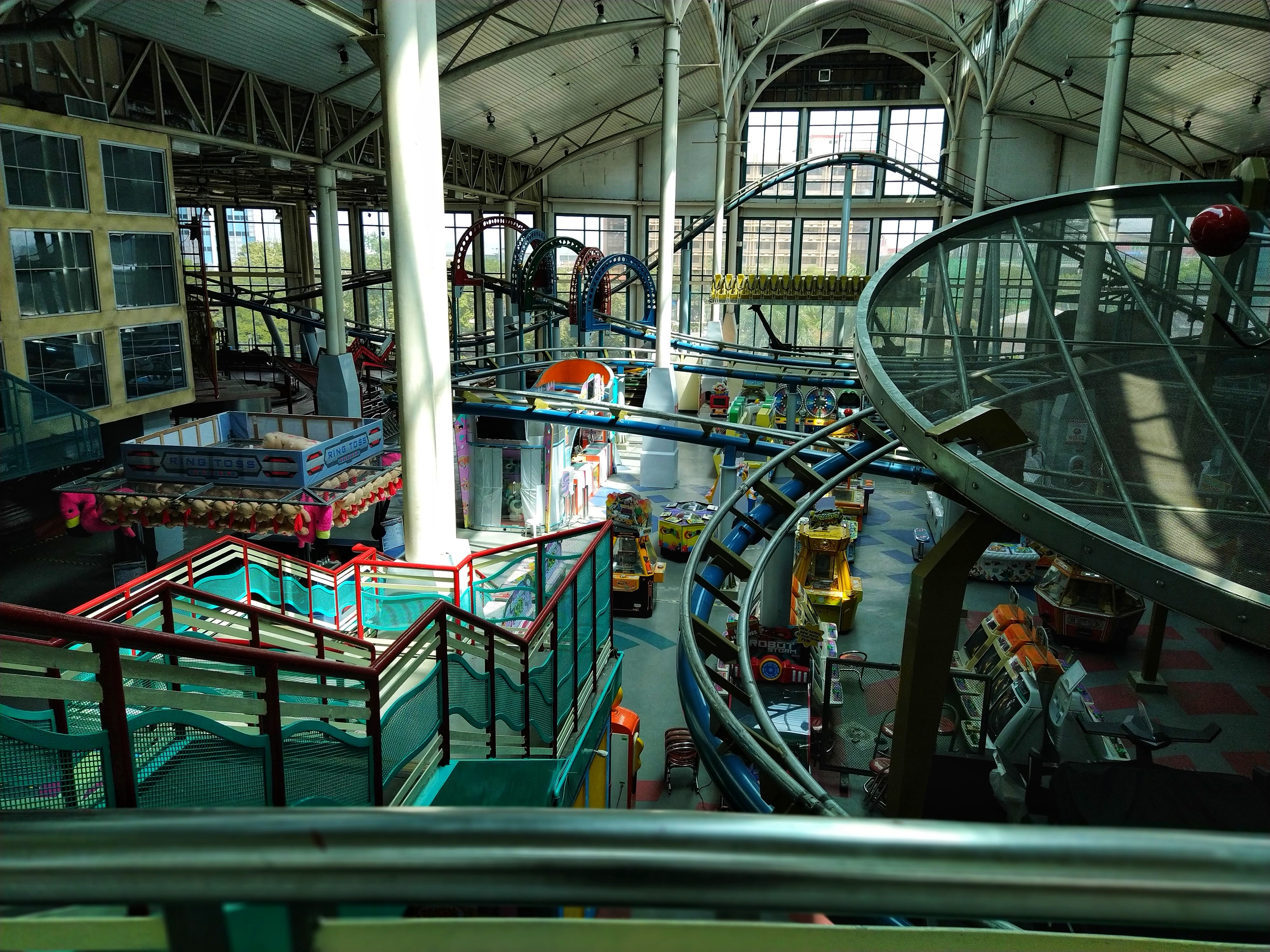
X-Site Indoor Amusement Park

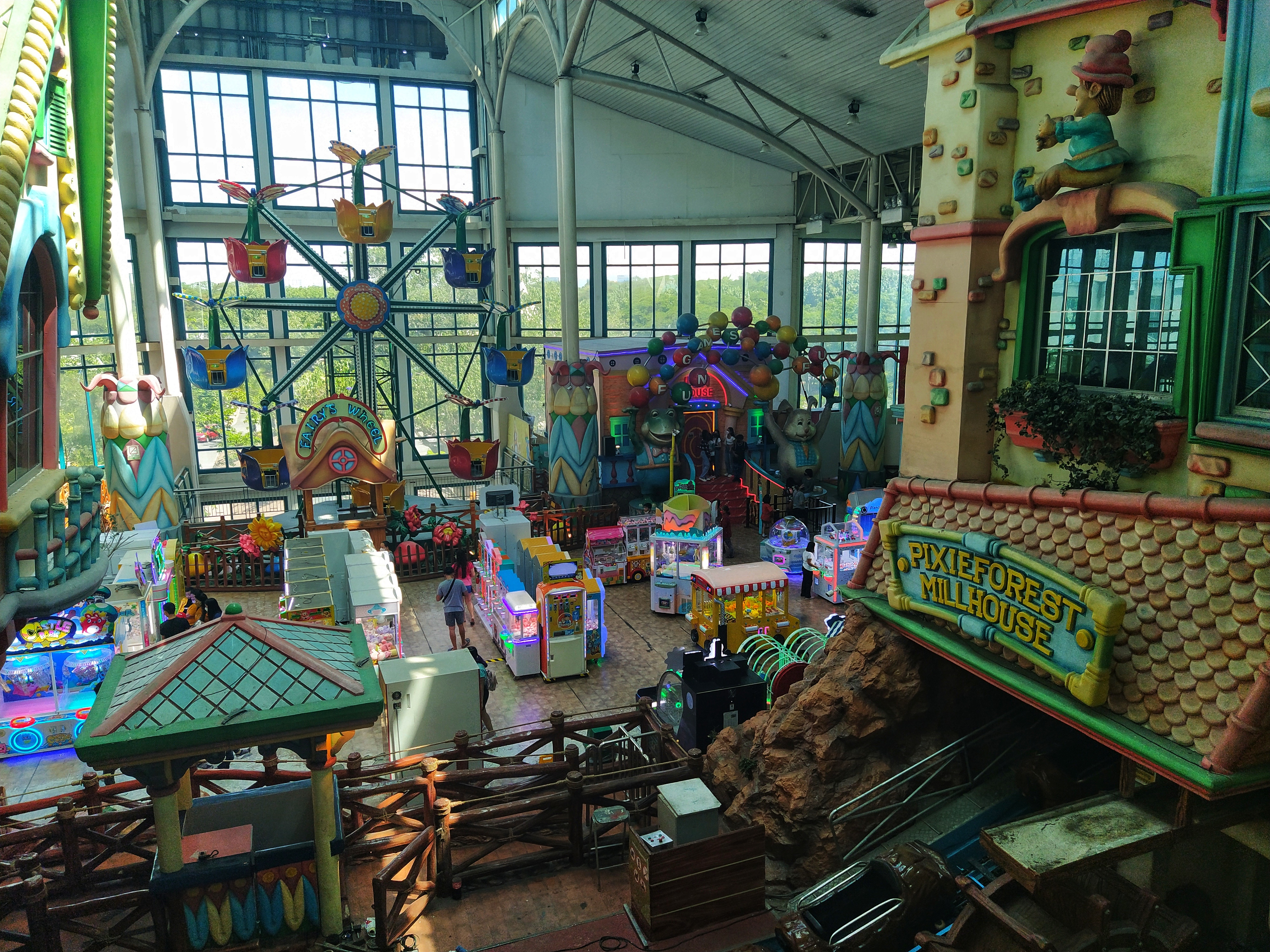
Pixie Forest

=== Supermarkets and Department Stores ===
- Landmark Supermarket
- Landmark Department Store
- Savemore Market
- Shopwise International Shopping
- Robinsons Department Store

=== Novelty Stores ===
- Decathlon
- Ace Hardware
- True Value

=== Entertainment centers ===
- Timezone
- X-Site
- Pixie Forest
- Tom's World

== Gallery ==
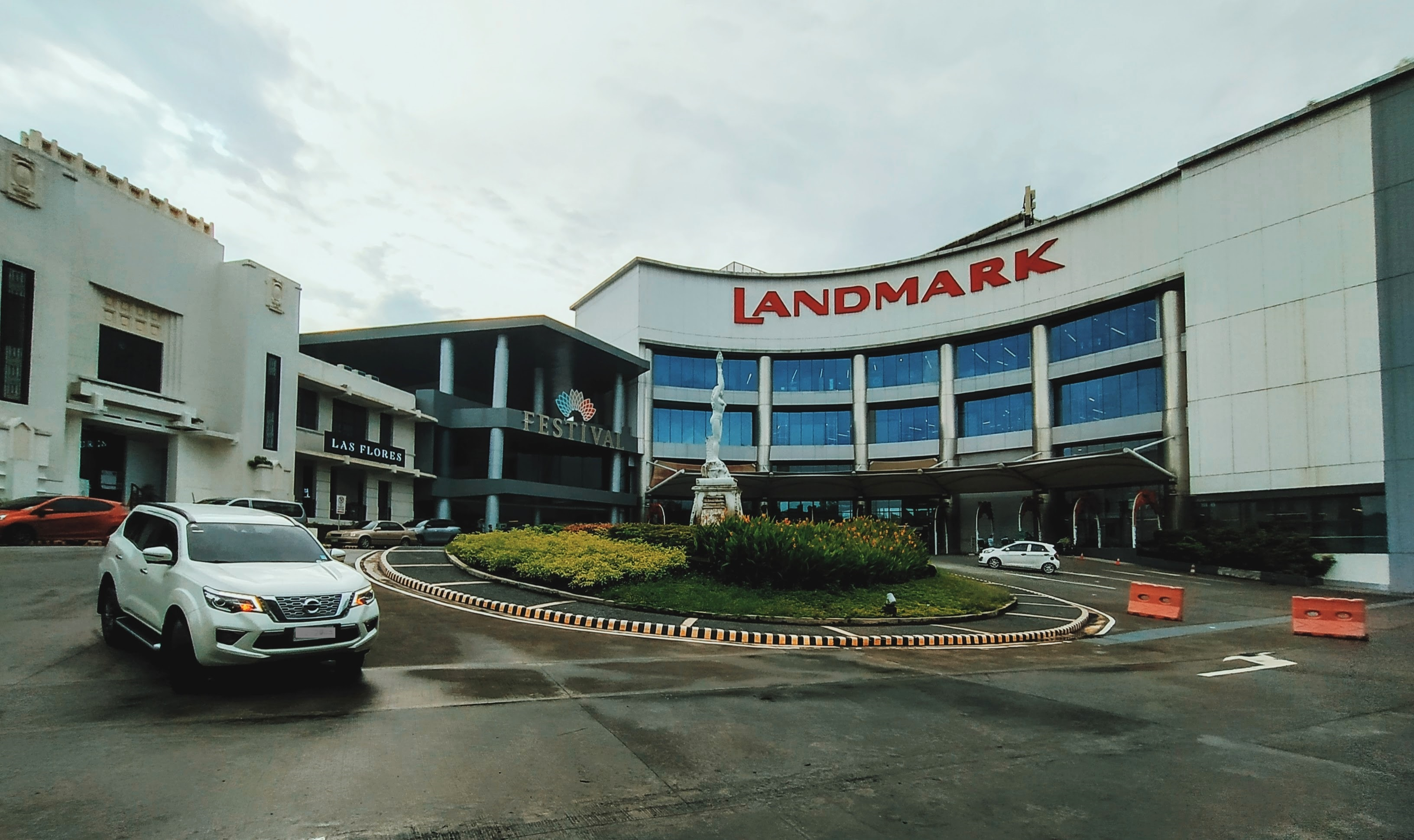
Eastern wing entrance

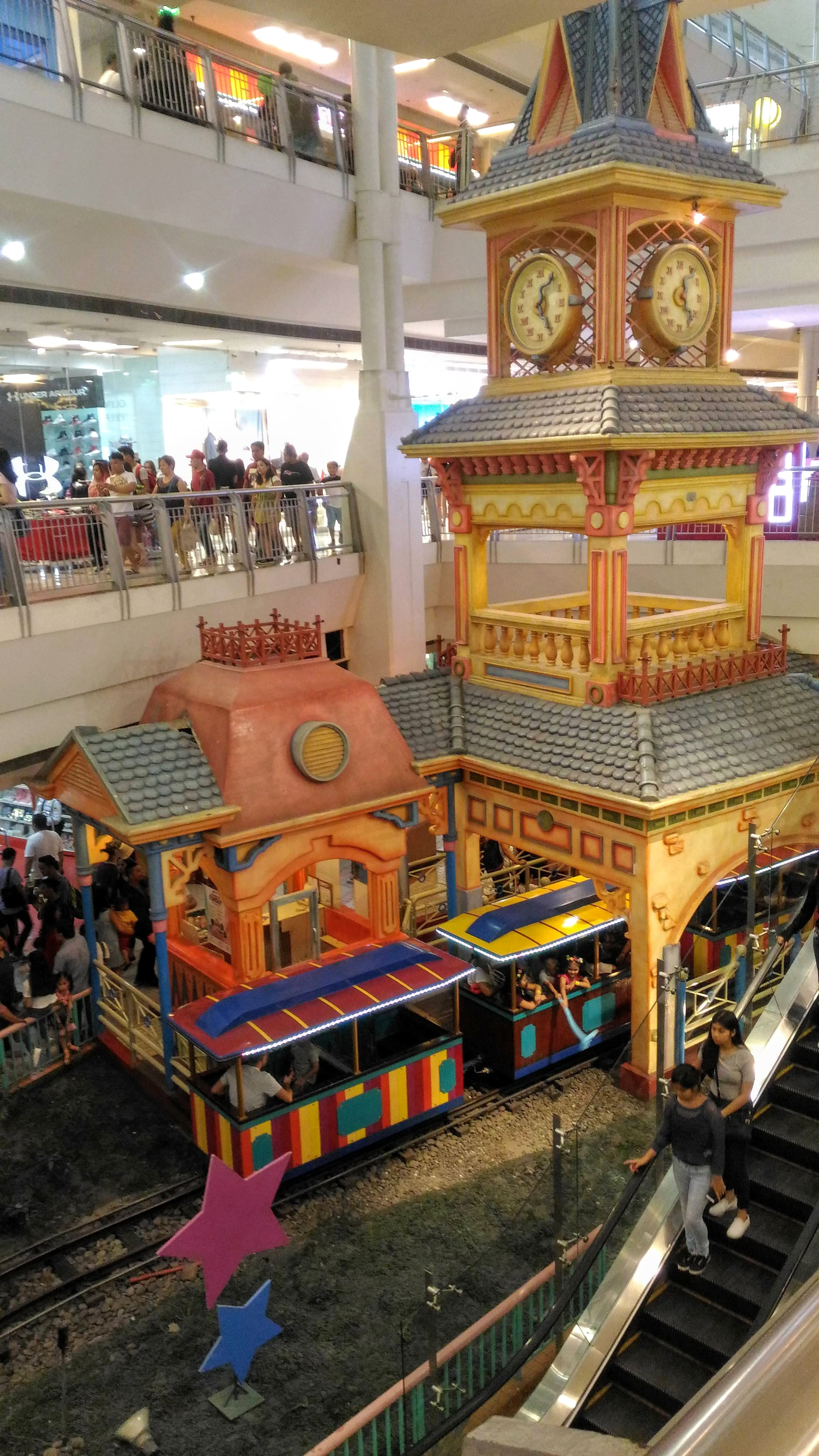
Festival Grand Station

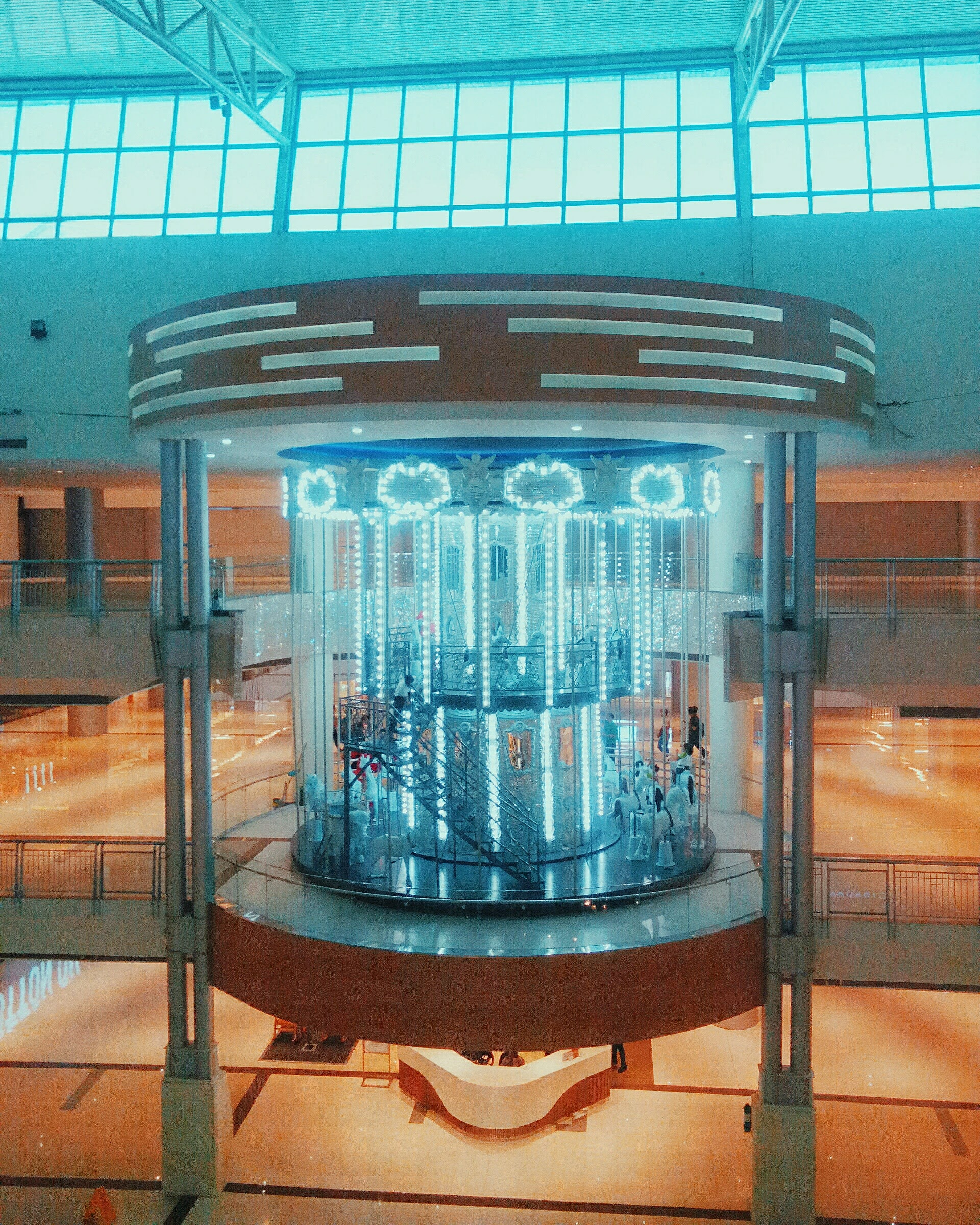
Festival Grand Carousel

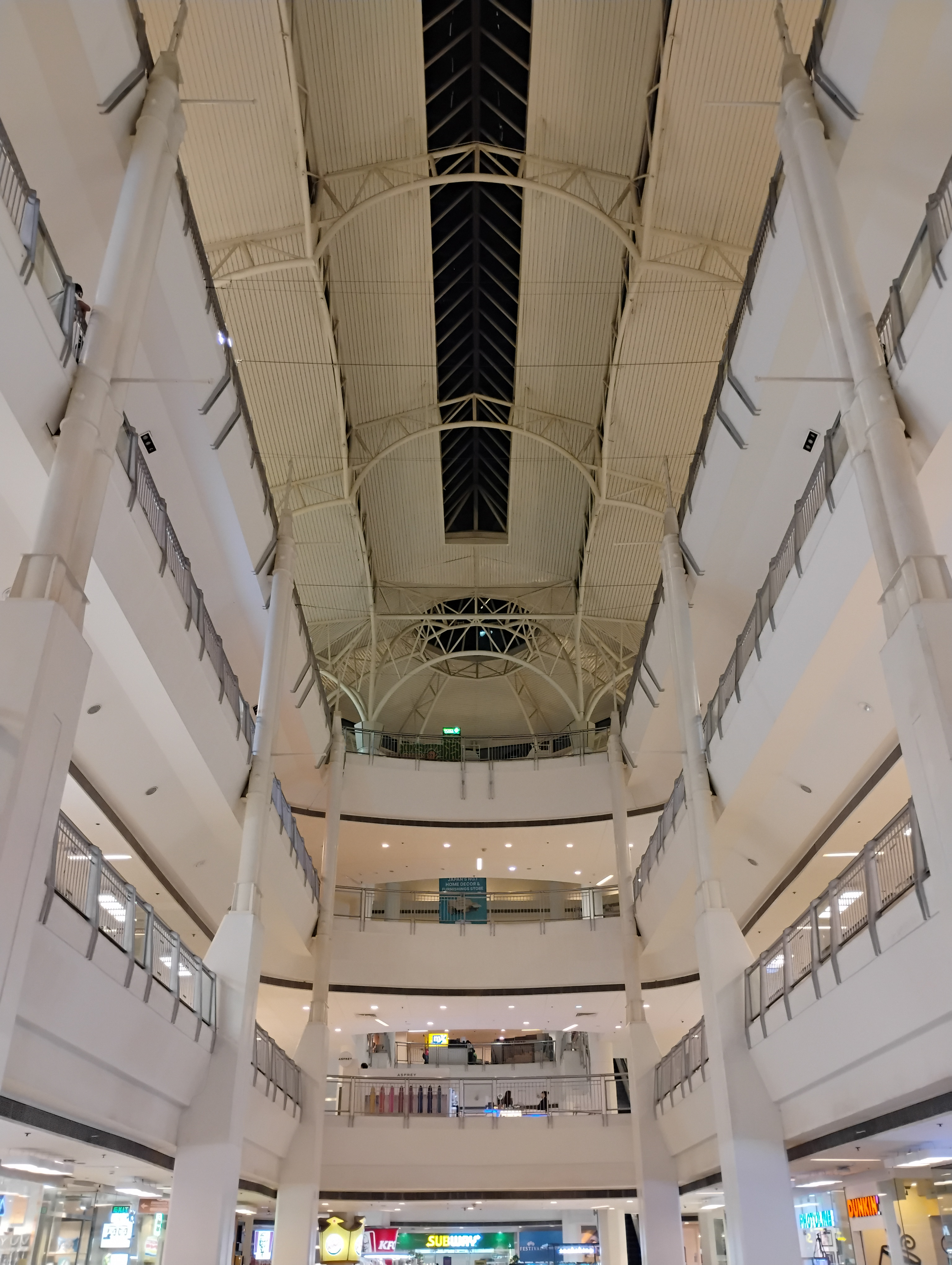
Mall interior

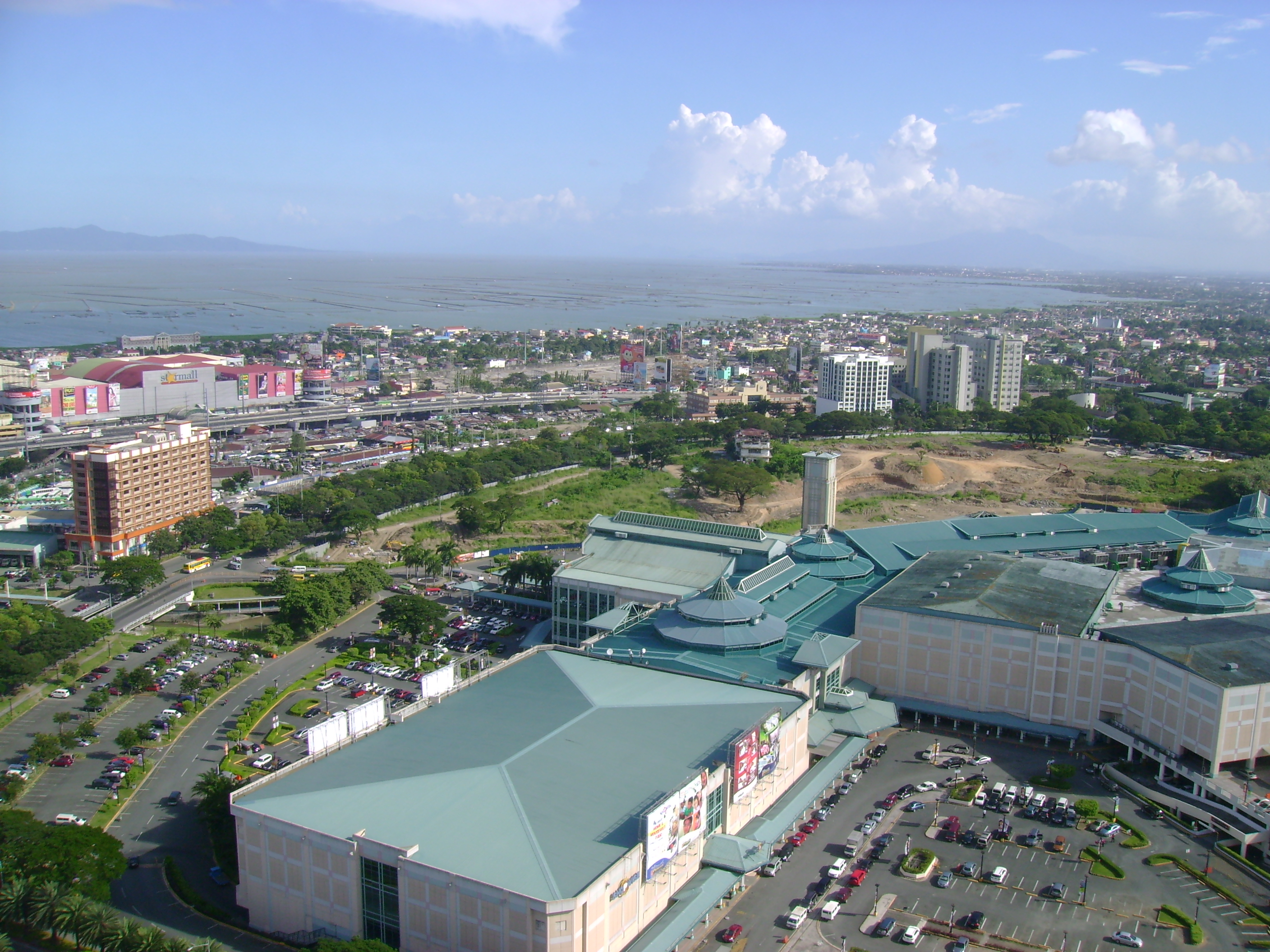
Bird's-eye view of the mall in 2006

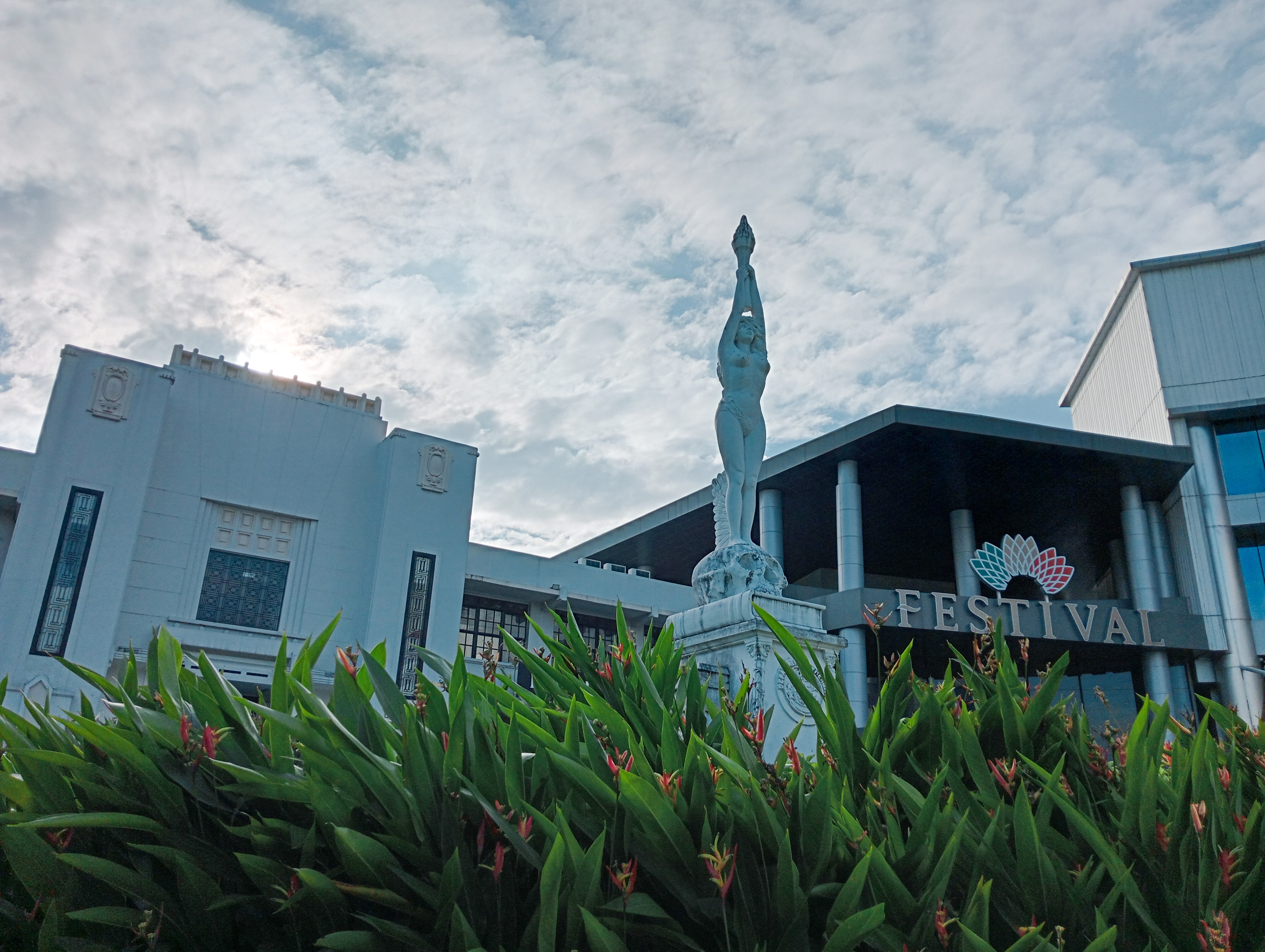
Replica of The Triumph of Science over Death

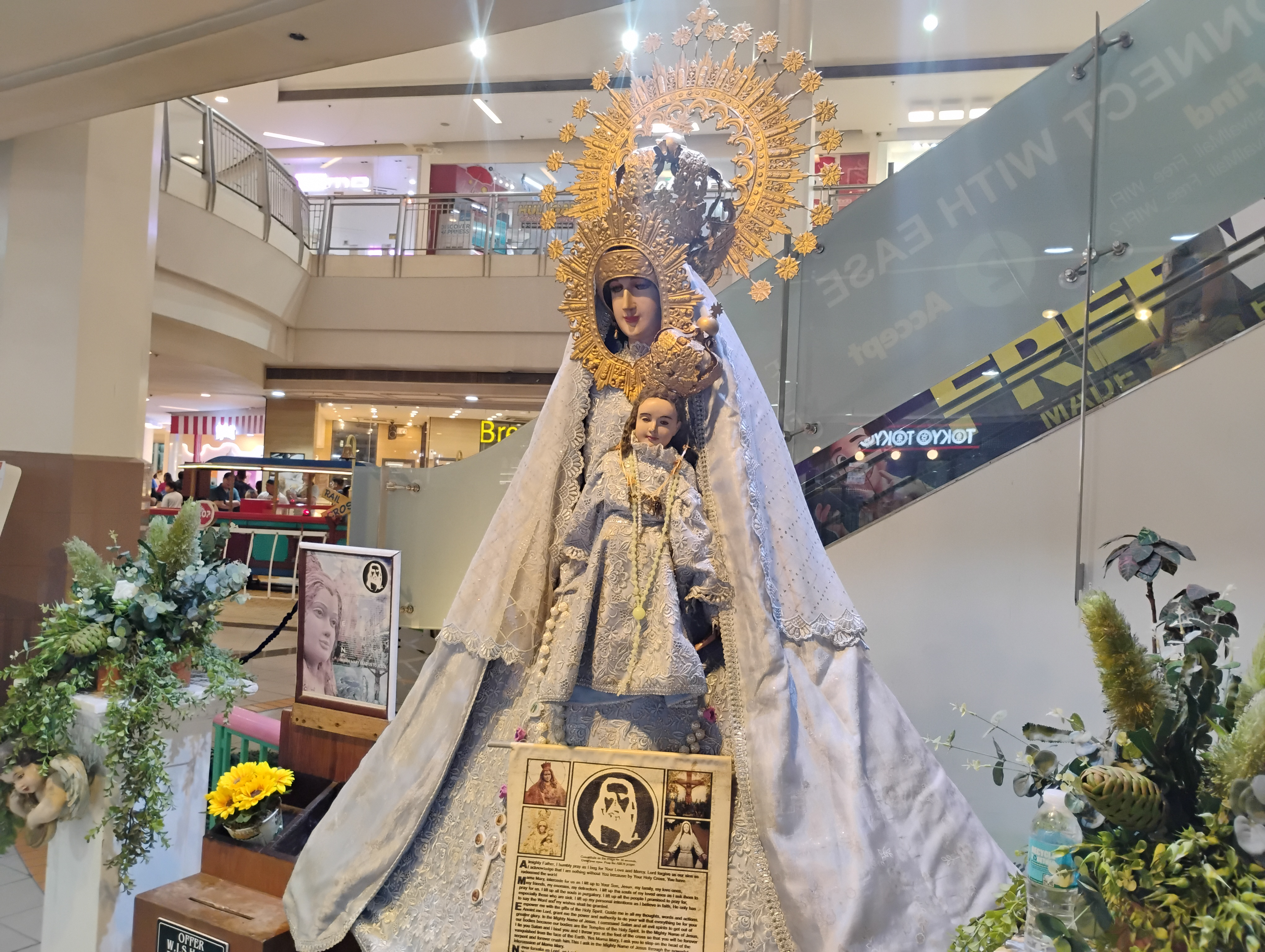
Image of Mother Mary carrying infant Jesus inside the mall

== In popular culture ==
- The mall is featured in an episode of Wansapanataym titled Mall Alone aired in 1999 and serves as the episode's main setting.

== See also ==
- List of shopping malls in the Philippines
- List of shopping mall retailers in the Philippines
- List of largest shopping malls in the Philippines
- List of shopping malls in Metro Manila
