= The Alabang Housewives =

- Genre: Reality
- Created by: ABC Development Corporation
- Directed by: James Robin Mayo
- Starring: Pamela Spella; Vanessa Ishitani
- Country of origin: Philippines
- Original language: Filipino
- No. of episodes: 20

Production
- Executive producer: Leo James Conde
- Running time: 30 minutes

Original release
- Network: TV5
- Release: January 14 – February 8, 2013

The Alabang Housewives is a Philippine television reality competition show broadcast by TV5. Hosted by Pamela Spella and Vanessa Ishitani, it aired from January 14, to February 8, 2013. Alabang is a barangay (ward) in Muntinlupa, which is a city in Metropolitan Manila.

== Overview ==
Aside from showcasing aspects of their lives, the show also features the pair interviewing celebrities, people in the government (e.g. MMDA Chairman Francis Tolentino) and also features behind-the-scenes looks of other TV5 shows, (appearing on the sets of Wil Time Bigtime, Never Say Goodbye, etc.) and even special-themed segments of other shows (Chef vs Mom segment).

== Main cast ==
- Pamela Spella - Pamela is one half of the Alabang Housewives Team that competed in the Amazing Race Philippines. Aside from working as a beauty consultant, Pamela also occupies her time on many hobbies that include painting, singing, dancing, writing, and decorating her home. She is married to an Italian and has two sons.
- Vanessa Ishitani - Vanessa is Pamela's best friend and team partner in the recent Amazing Race Philippines. An accomplished businesswoman, Vanessa spends her free time on shopping, ballroom dancing, and regular beauty treatments. She is currently separated from her Japanese husband with whom she has two kids.

== See also ==
- List of TV5 (Philippine TV network) original programming
