= Ayala Malls Manila Bay =

Shopping mall in Parañaque, Philippines

- The mall along Asean Avenue
- Coordinates: 14°31′24″N 120°59′21″E
- Address: Macapagal Boulevard cor. Asean Avenue, Aseana City, Tambo, Parañaque, Metro Manila
- Opened: September 26, 2019; 7 years ago
- Previous names: Ayala Malls Bay Area
- Developer: Ayala Land
- Manager: Ayala Malls
- Num. of stores: 353
- Num. of anchor tenants: 1 (soon to open)
- Floor area: 400,000 m^{2} (4,300,000 sq ft)
- Floors: 8 upper + 3 basement
- Public transit: Redemptorist–Aseana MIA E City of Dreams / Ayala Malls Manila Bay; 4 6 7 14 29 34 City of Dreams / Ayala Malls Manila Bay
- Website: https://www.ayalamalls.com

Ayala Malls Manila Bay (formerly Ayala Malls Bay Area) is a large shopping mall in Metro Manila, developed by Ayala Malls, a wholly owned subsidiary of Ayala Corporation. Opened on September 26, 2019, it is the first and only Ayala Mall in Parañaque. It is located in the Aseana City township development in Bay City, a reclamation area on Manila Bay. With a total floor area measuring 400,000 m^{2} (4,300,000 sq ft), it is the largest Ayala Mall and the sixth largest shopping mall in the Philippines, tied with Festival Alabang.

== Features ==
View of the Central Garden

Ayala Malls Manila Bay features two buildings and five floors of retail space, with three levels of basement parking and above-ground Podium Parking from the second to eighth floor. It has the Abueva Atrium (adjacent to a street of the same name) at Building B for events, one-hectare (2.5-acre) Central Garden, IT Zone at the fourth floor, and ten digital cinemas at the fifth floor. The largest among Ayala Malls, the cinemas include an A-Giant Screen cinema, while some have A-Luxe Recliner Seats. The mall also hosts multiple entertainment and leisure facilities including a Timezone branch at 2,000 square meters (22,000 sq ft), formerly the largest in the country. It is also home to Mindspark, the country's largest science museum that opened in 2025.

The mall has four dedicated country-specific shopping sections: the Filipino Village, China Town, Japan Town and Korea Town. The Filipino Village also houses the Food Wanderer by Lakbay Museo, an interactive art museum which moved to the mall in September 2022 from the S Maison at the SM Mall of Asia complex.

Located at the fourth floor of the mall is the Express Lingkod Office (ELO) Serbisyo Center, a one-stop-shop service center providing personal and business frontline services of the Parañaque City Government. Other government offices branching in the mall are Philippine Statistics Authority (Civil Registry System outlet), Professional Regulation Commission, and Pag-IBIG Fund.

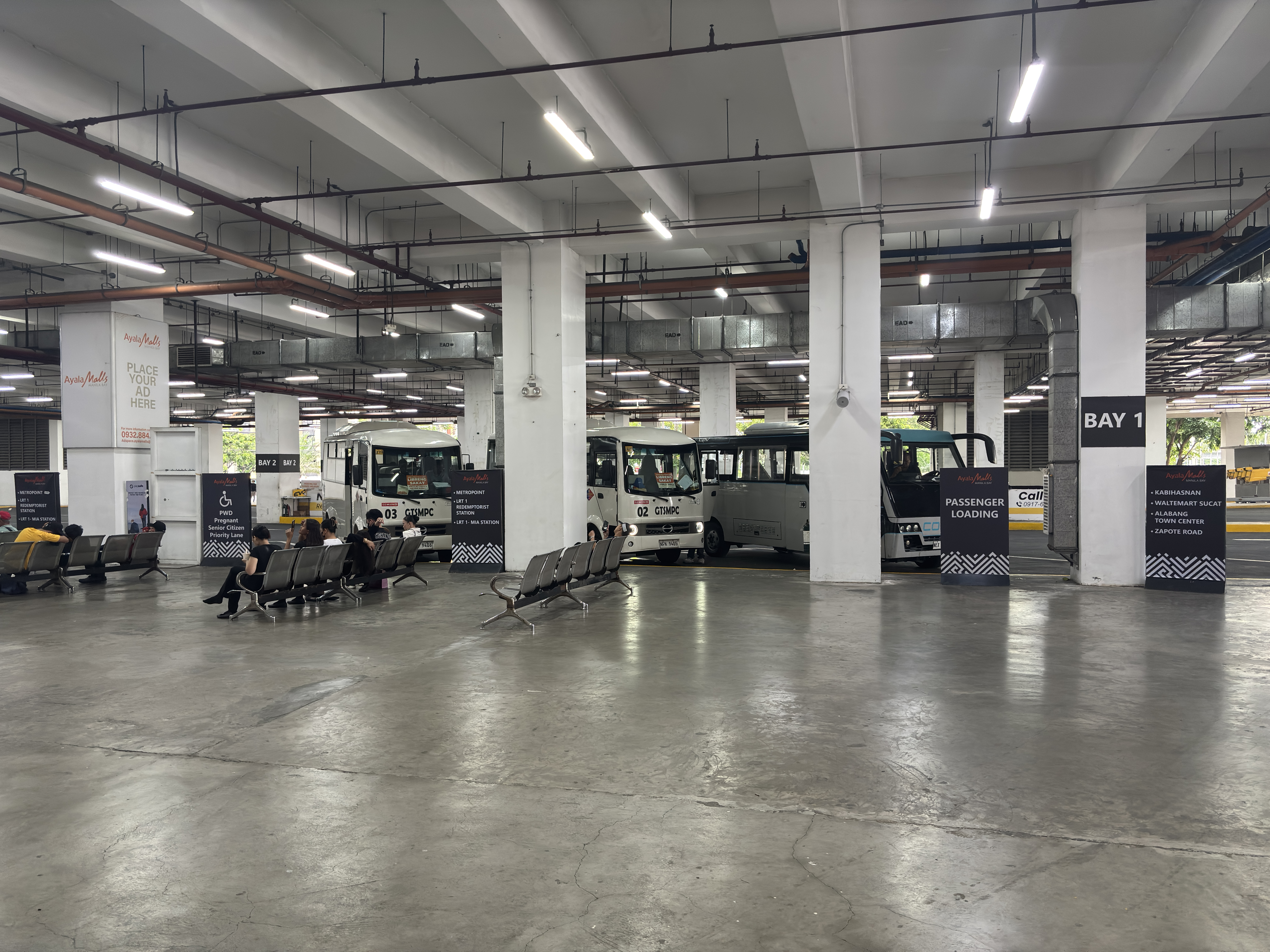
Ayala Malls Manila Bay transport terminal

Located at the ground floor of the mall is its indoor transport terminal. An electric vehicle charging station by ACMobility is also located at the mall's Almario Road entrance.

=== Landmark Manila Bay ===
The mall is anchored by The Landmark Department Store and Supermarket, located along the mall's northeastern section at Building A. The department store, which has five floors of retail space, was initially planned to be opened within 2023, yet the construction faced delays due to undisclosed factors. The supermarket and food center opened on October 25, 2024, while the department store was opened on December 1, 2024. A Roman Catholic chapel called the Mary Mother of Hope Chapel Manila Bay was inaugurated at The Landmark on May 24, 2026.

=== Seda Manila Bay ===
The mall also features the Seda Manila Bay Hotel, a 350-room 4-star hotel which opened its doors in July 2023, and located along the corners of Abueva Road and Aseana Avenue. The hotel was eventually planned to be opened within 2021 while entering full operations in 2022, yet was pushed back due to the effects of the COVID-19 pandemic in the country. The 12-storey hotel features 3 meeting rooms; three restaurants, namely the Misto Restaurant, Straight Up Roof Deck Bar, and the Club Lounge; an infinity pool, a game room, a mini golf course, a gym, and the Seda Spa. The hotel's lounge features artworks from Ann Pamintuan, Francisco "Paco" Guerrero, Eddie Zobel, and Jaime Zobel de Ayala.

== Events ==
- Actor Henry Cavill visited the mall to promote The Witcher in a fan meeting on December 12, 2019.
- Nikon Philippines hosted Nikon Day 2023, the largest congregation of Nikon photographers in the Philippines on March 25, 2023. The event consisted of a photo walk and photo contest, workshops, demo shoots, and raffle prizes for more than 600 pre-registered attendees.

== Incidents ==
- July 17, 2024: A fire broke out at a restaurant on the mall's second floor past 9:00 p.m. PHT. It was raised to the second alarm and was extinguished more than an hour later.

== Gallery ==
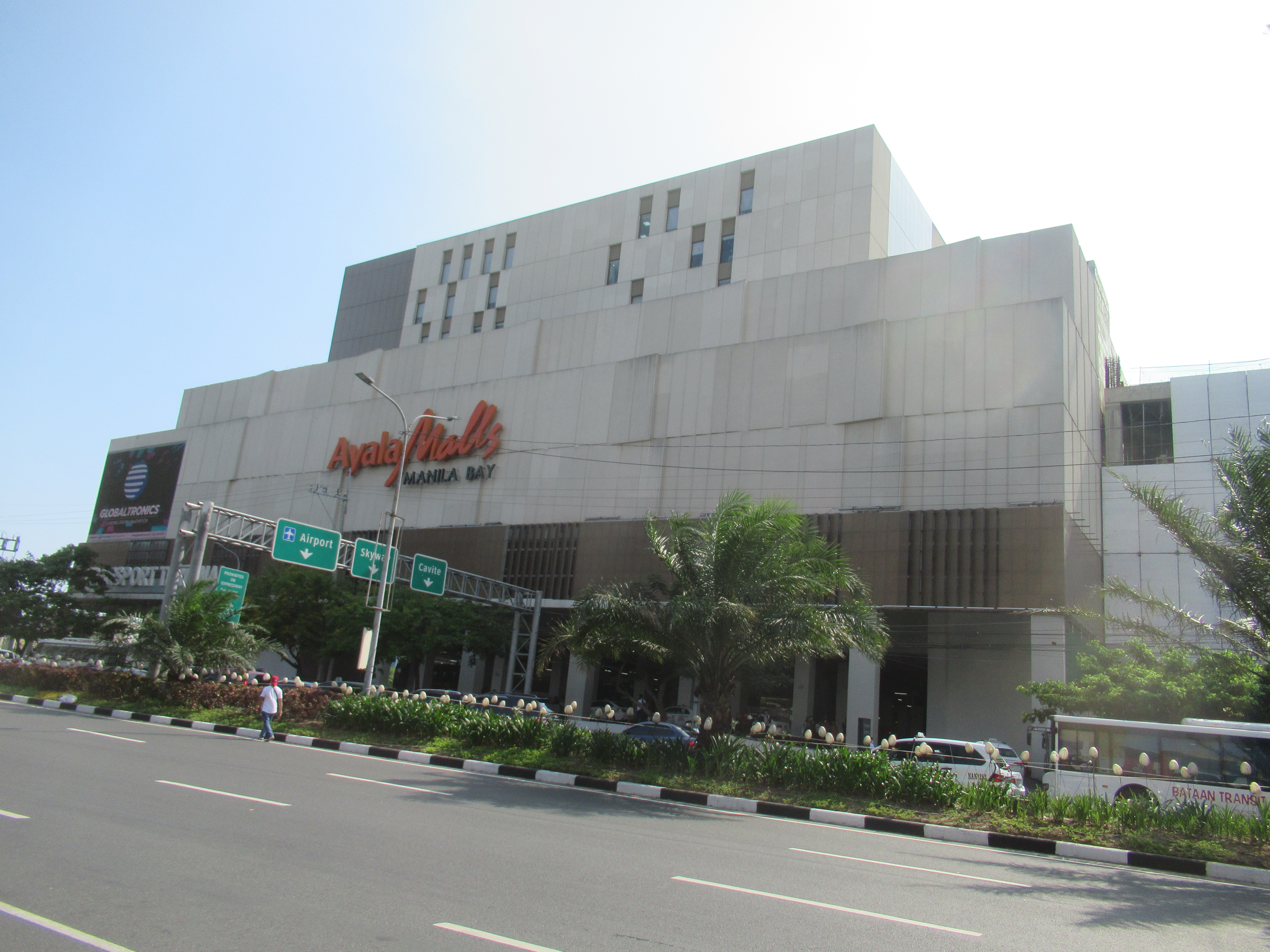
The mall along Macapagal Boulevard

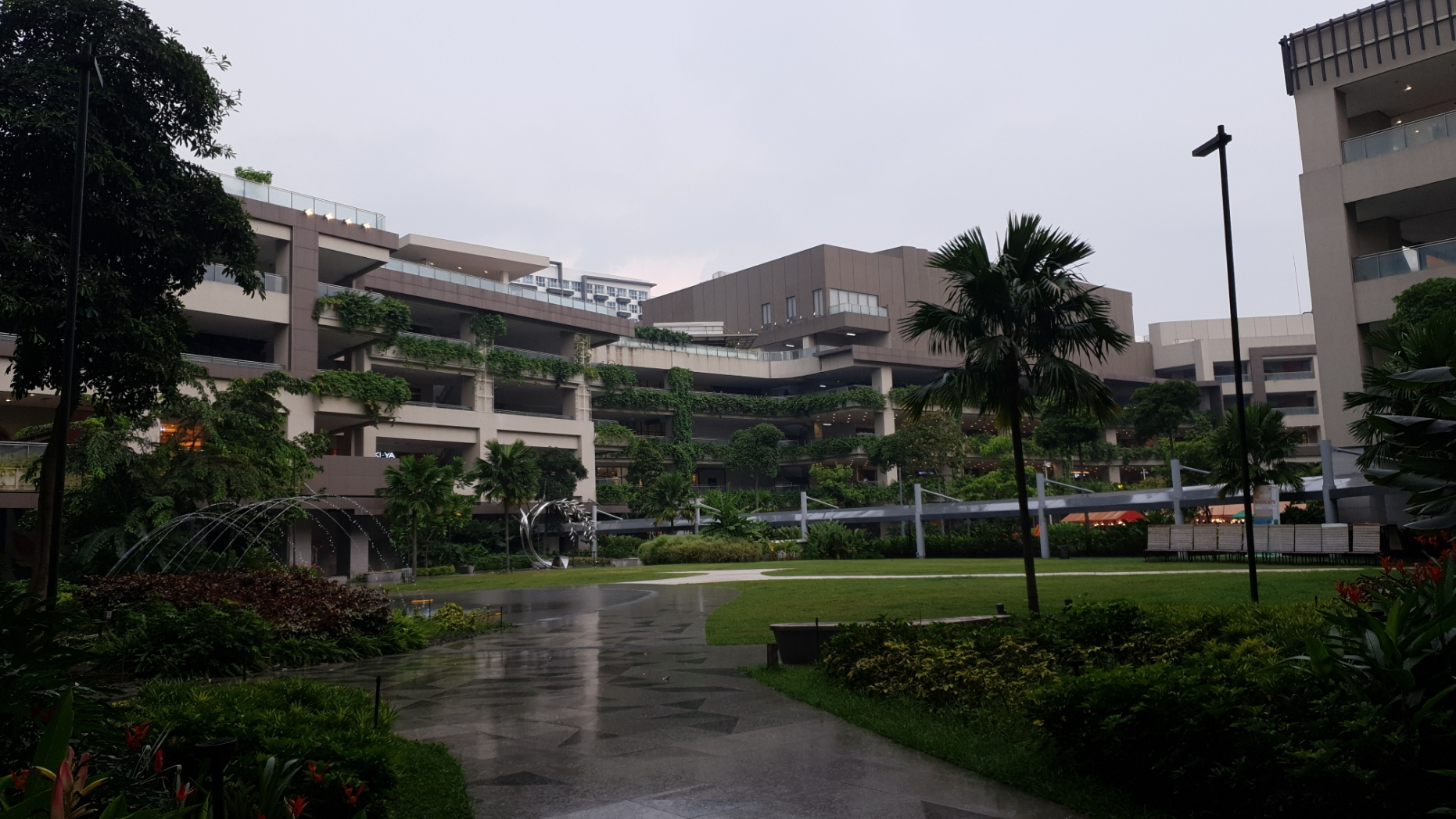
Central Garden on a rainy day
