= List of largest shopping malls in the Philippines =

This article lists the largest shopping malls in the Philippines by gross floor area.

== Malls by gross floor area ==
One of the world's top twenty largest malls

| # | Mall | Image | Location | | Gross floor area (Date) | Opened | Number of shops |
| # | Mall | Image | City | Province (Note: Including Metro Manila which is not a province but a region) | Gross floor area (Date) | Opened | Number of shops |
|---|---|---|---|---|---|---|---|
| 1 | SM Mall of Asia | | Pasay City | Metro Manila | 497,000 m^{2} (September 2025) | 2006 | 3,500+ |
| 2 | SM North EDSA | | Quezon City | Metro Manila | 477,000 m^{2} (September 2025) | 1985 | 1,000+ |
| 3 | SM Megamall | | Mandaluyong | Metro Manila | 474,000 m^{2} (September 2025) | 1991 | 900+ |
| 4 | SM Seaside City | | Cebu City | Cebu | 407,000 m^{2} (September 2025) | 2015 | 700+ |
| 5 | Ayala Malls Manila Bay | | Parañaque | Metro Manila | 400,000 m^{2} (Note: Numerous sources stated that the gross floor area of Ayala Malls Bay Area is 400,000 m^{2} (40 ha)) | 2019 | 500+ |
| 5 | Festival Mall | | Muntinlupa | Metro Manila | 400,000 m^{2} (2017) | 1998 | 1,300+ |
| 6 | Gateway Mall | | Quezon City | Metro Manila | 300,000 m^{2} | 2004 | 500+ |
| 7 | Ayala Center Cebu | | Cebu City | Cebu | 290,000 m^{2} | 1994 | 800+ |
| 8 | SM City Fairview | | Quezon City | Metro Manila | 280,000 m^{2} (September 2025) | 1997 | 700+ |
| 9 | SM City Cebu | | Cebu City | Cebu | 268,000 m^{2} (September 2025) | 1993 | 700+ |
| 10 | Greenbelt | | Makati | Metro Manila | 250,000 m^{2} | 1988 | 300+ |
| 10 | Glorietta | | Makati | Metro Manila | 250,000 m^{2} | 1991 | 400+ |
| 12 | Gaisano Mall of Davao | | Davao City | Davao del Sur | 240,605 m^{2} | 1997 | 900+ |
| 13 | Robinsons Manila | | Manila | Metro Manila | 240,000 m^{2} | 1995 | 500+ |
| 14 | Trinoma | | Quezon City | Metro Manila | 235,000 m^{2} | 2007 | 550+ |
| 15 | Sta. Lucia Mall | | Cainta | Rizal | 230,000 m^{2} | 1991 | 300+ |
| 16 | Robinsons Galleria | | Quezon City | Metro Manila | 216,000 m^{2} | 1990 | 500+ |
| 17 | Gaisano Mall of Cebu | | Cebu City | Cebu | 200,000 m^{2} | 2022 | 500+ |
| 17 | SM Aura | | Taguig | Metro Manila | 200,000 m^{2} (September 2025) | 2013 | 200+ |

== Largest shopping malls by island group ==
| Mall | Location | Gross floor area | Opened | Island group |
|---|---|---|---|---|
| SM Mall of Asia | Pasay City | 497,000 m^{2} | 2006 | Luzon |
| SM Seaside City | Cebu City | 407,000 m^{2} | 2015 | Visayas |
| SM City Davao | Davao City | 285,820 m^{2} | 2001 | Mindanao |

== See also ==
- List of largest shopping malls in the world
- List of shopping malls in the Philippines
- List of shopping malls in Metro Manila
