= Filinvest City =

Central business district in Muntinlupa

- Central Business District
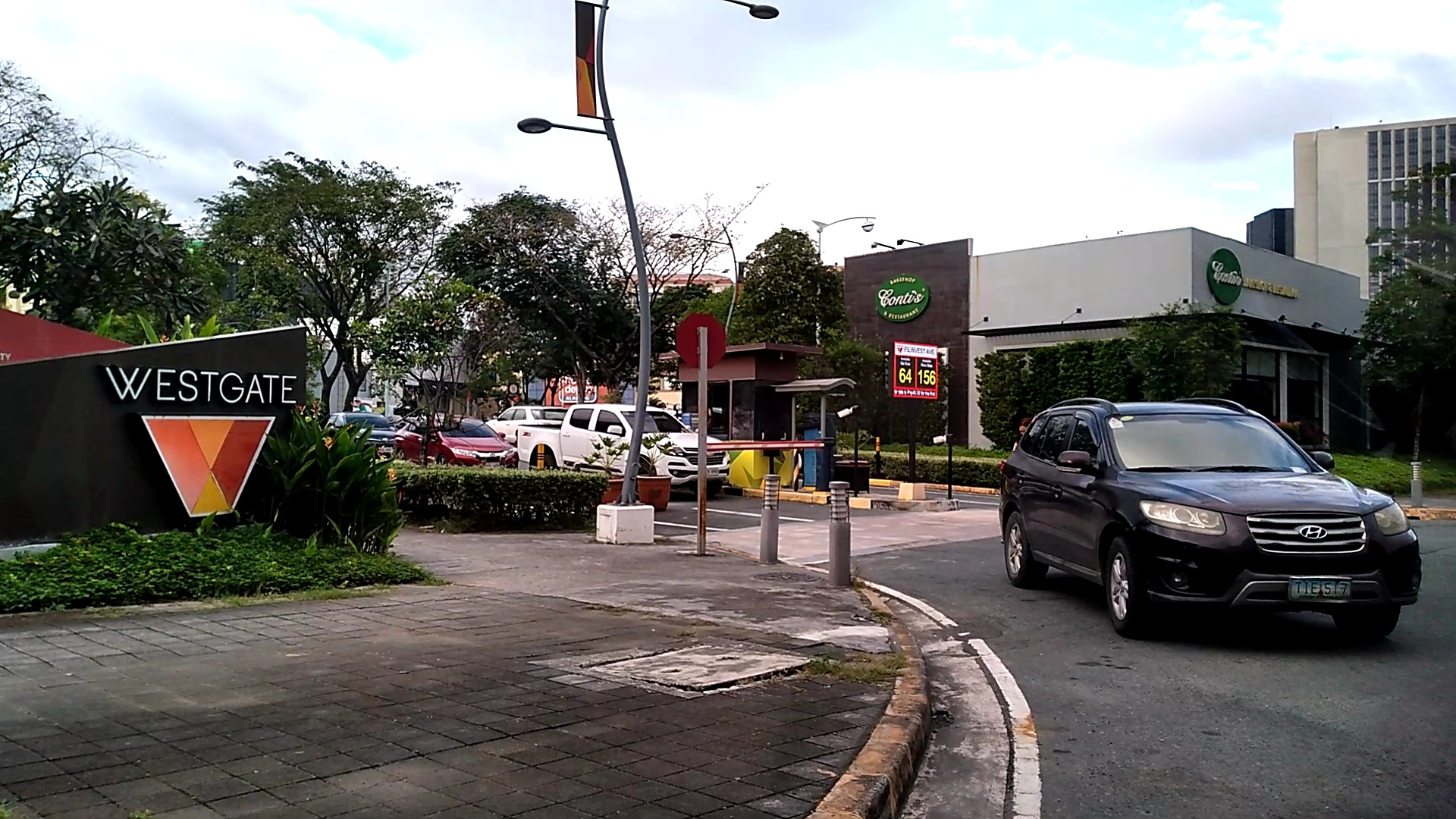
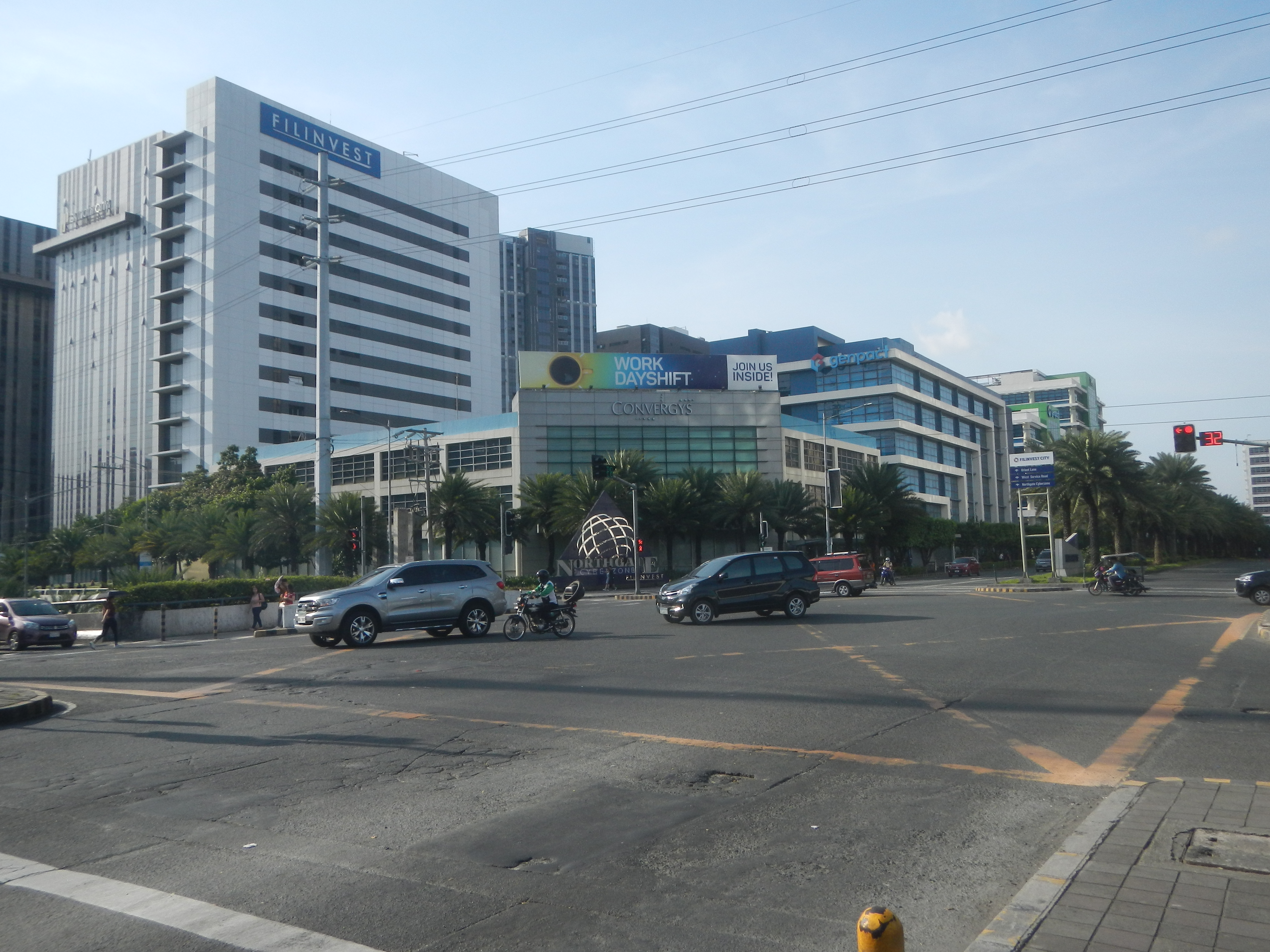
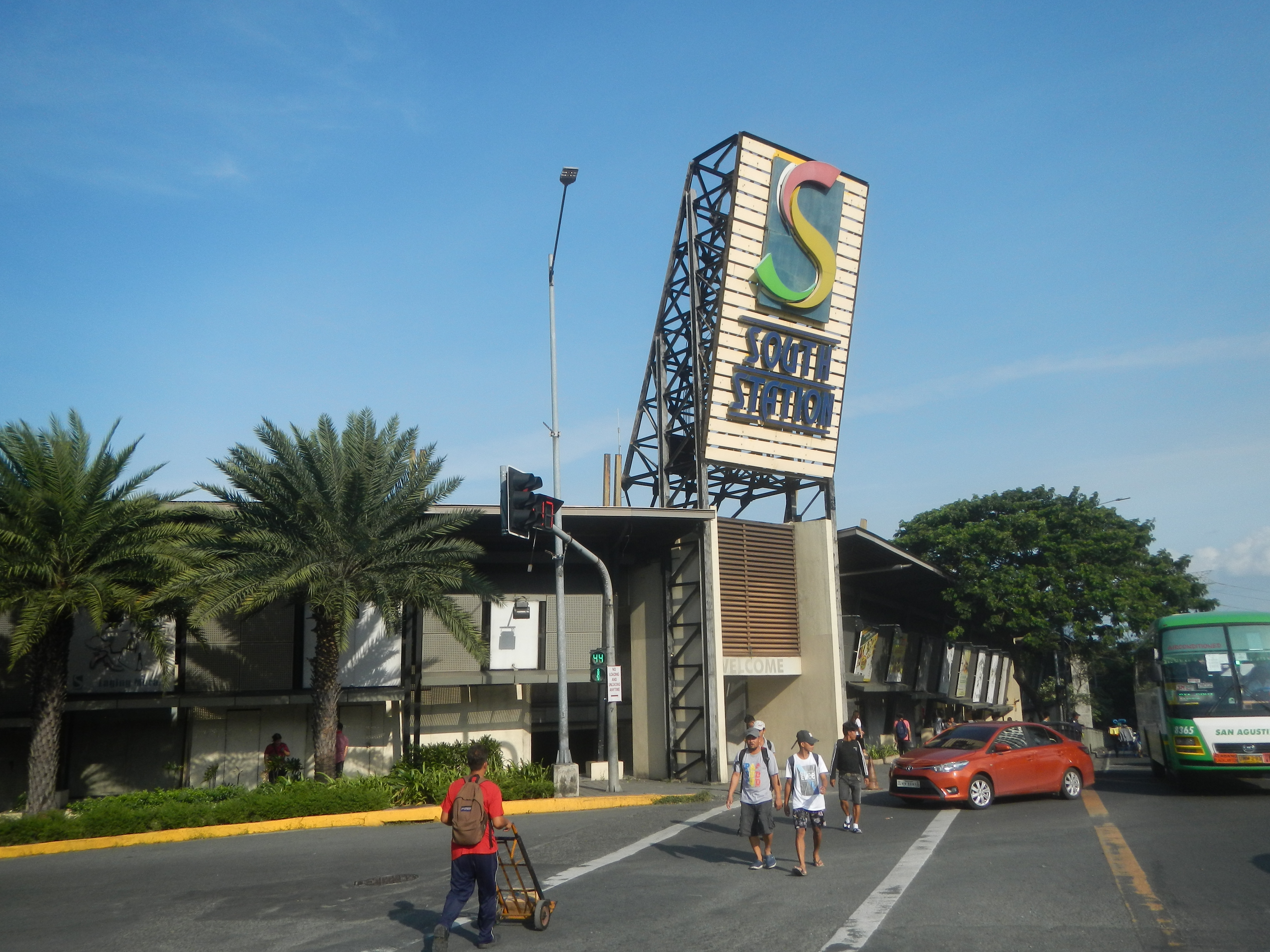
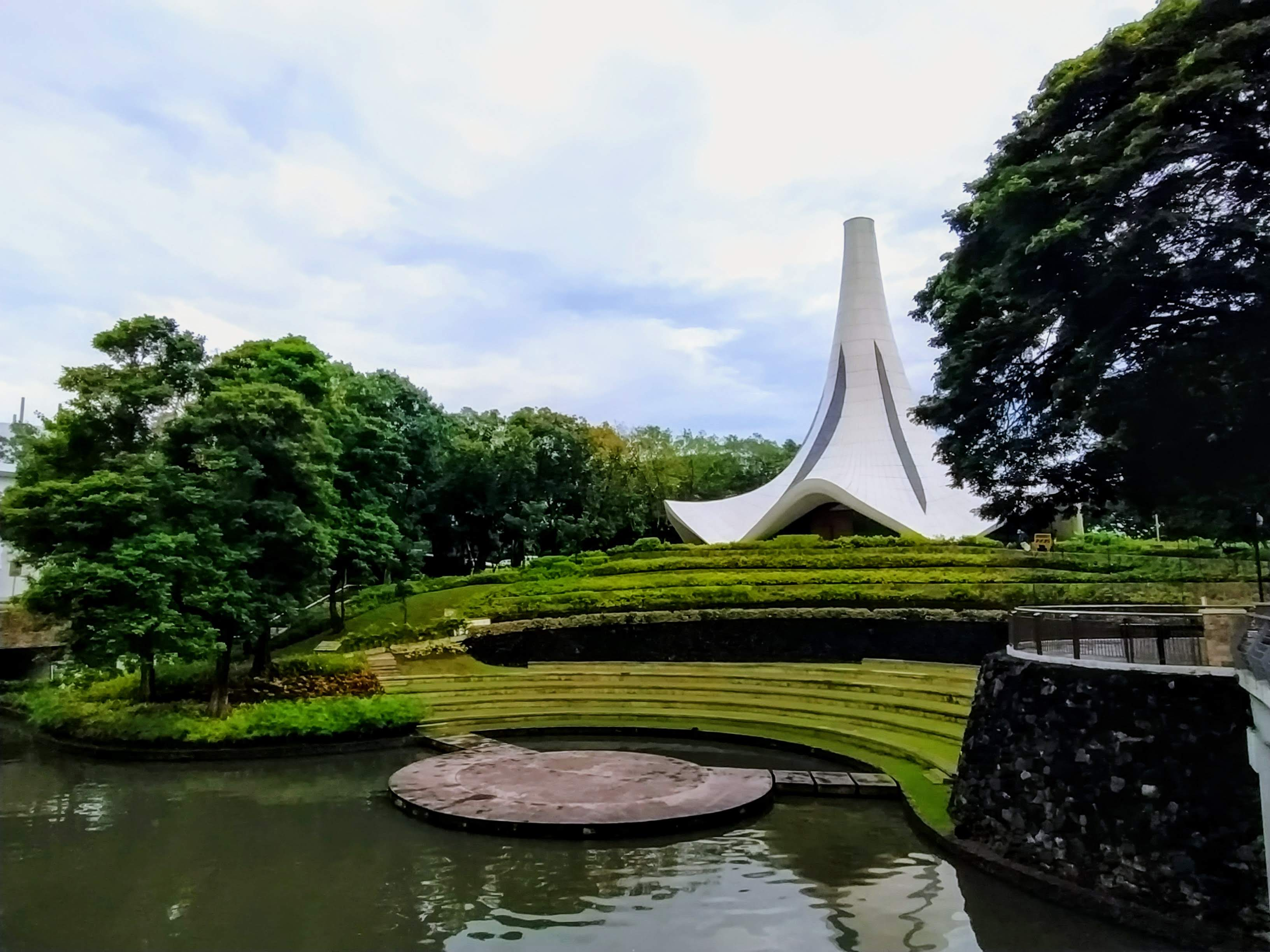
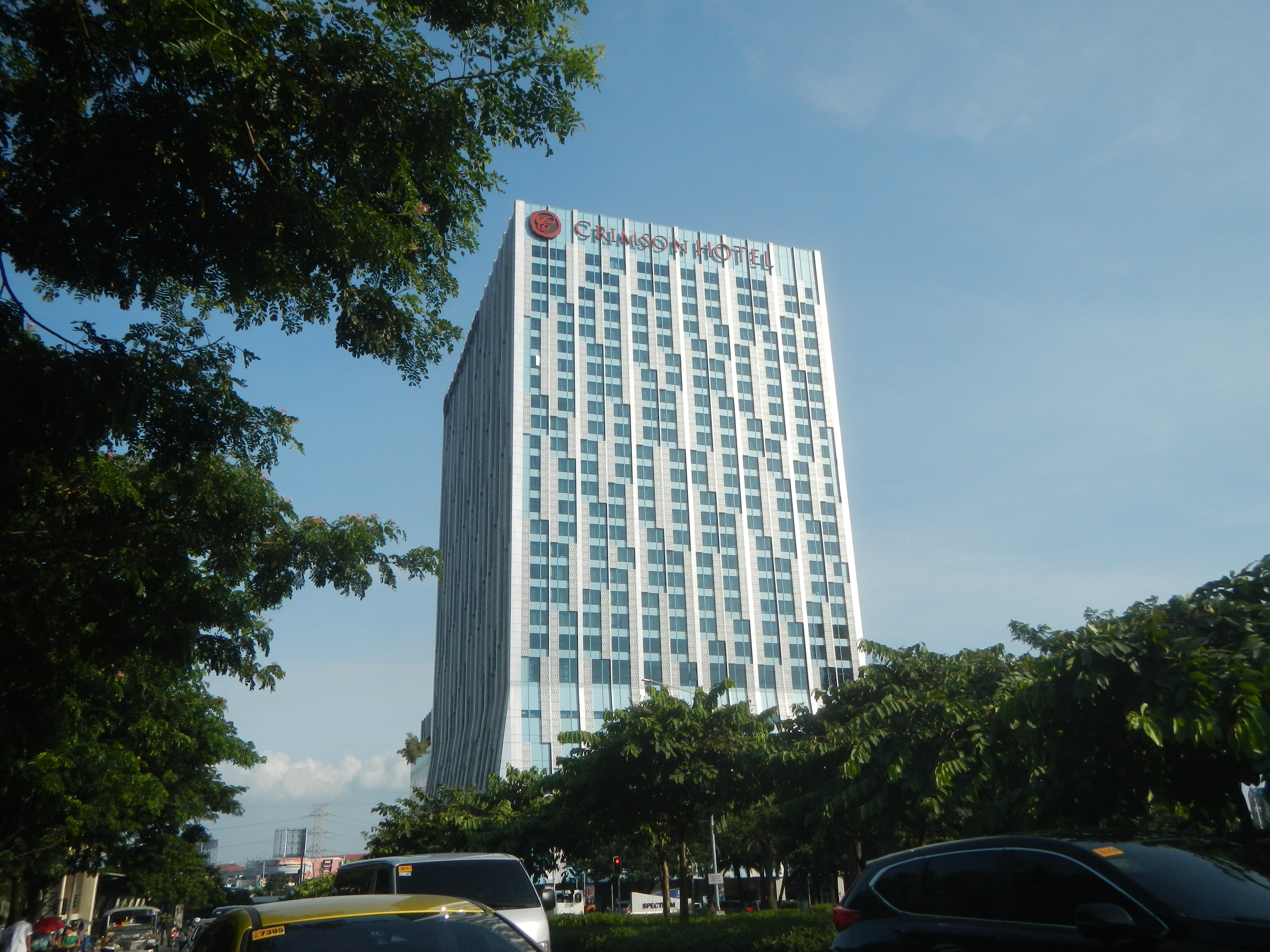
- Clockwise from top: Filinvest bird's eye view, Westgate Center, South Station, Crimson Hotel, Our Lady of Lourdes Chapel, Northgate Cyberzone

- Nicknames: CBD of the South
- Interactive map of Filinvest City
- Location within Metro Manila Location within Philippines
- Coordinates: 14°25′02.9″N 121°02′31″E
- Country: Philippines
- Region: National Capital Region
- City: Muntinlupa
- Barangay: Alabang
- Developer: Filinvest Development Corporation
- Incorporated: 1993

Area
  - Total: 244 ha (600 acres)
- Time zone: UTC+8 (PST)
- ZIP code: 1781
- Area code: 2
- Website: filinvestcity.com

Filinvest City, formerly Filinvest Corporate City, is a central business district situated within Muntinlupa in Metro Manila.

== History ==
The development of Filinvest City began in 1995 by Filinvest at the site of the former Alabang Stock Farm. Under the administration of President Fidel V. Ramos, the farm was opened for joint development with the private sector and the government-owned property was placed for bidding. The Gotianuns acquired the farm after it bested the bids of companies of the Ayala and Gokongwei families in a government-organized bidding. The project was started by the Filinvest Development Corporation (FDC) through its founder Andrew L. Gotianun Sr.

FDC established Filinvest Alabang, Inc. on August 25, 1993, to enter into a joint agreement with the government to develop the farm. The development was earlier known as the Filinvest Corporate City but was rebranded as Filinvest City to reflect a shift of the area as a mixed-use development from a primarily commercial venture.

The master plan for Filinvest was revised in 2017 with the help of Singaporean firm AECOM. This led to the opening of the Spectrum Linear Park and the Northgate Cyberzone district cooling system by early 2018.

== Management ==
Filinvest City is developed and managed by Filinvest Alabang, Inc. which is a subsidiary of Filinvest Development Corporation and Filinvest Land Inc.. Under the joint agreement with the government, the FAI owned 74 percent stake in Filinvest City.

== Residential areas ==
Among the residential settlements in Filinvest City include Botanika Nature Residence, Vivant Flats, La Vie Flats, and the Bristol at Parkway Place.

== Developments ==
The central business district is divided into six divisions, namely City Center, Civic Plaza, Northgate Cyberzone, Westgate Center, Spectrum Business District, and The Palms Country Club. Key district areas in Filinvest City include the shopping centre Festival Alabang and public spaces like The River Park, Spectrum Linear Park, and the Filinvest City Event Grounds, the last of which has hosted the Wanderland Music and Arts Festival since 2017. The district is also accessible to the Alabang–Zapote Road and transportation services are available in South Station and Festival Mall.

== Transportation ==
The area is served by the South Luzon Expressway, the Metro Manila Skyway, and the South Station transport terminal, as well as Alabang station of the Philippine National Railways; it will also be served by the North–South Commuter Railway (NSCR).

== See also ==
- Araneta City
- Bonifacio Global City
- Makati Central Business District
