= Alabang =

Barangay in Muntinlupa, Metro Manila, Philippines

- Barangay
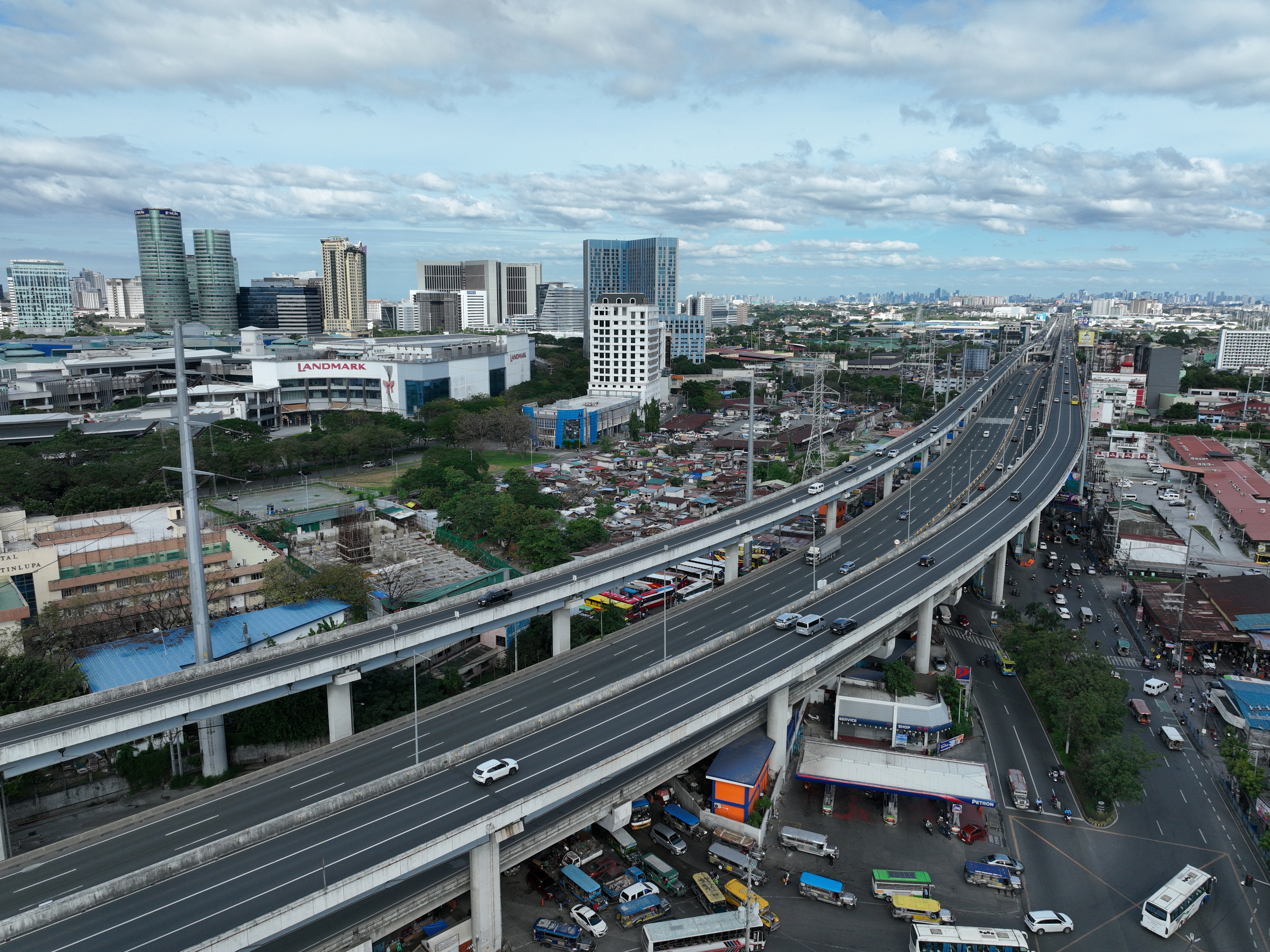
- Aerial view of Alabang (2026)
- Interactive map of Alabang
- Coordinates: 14°25′02″N 121°02′31″E
- Country: Philippines
- Region: National Capital Region
- City: Muntinlupa
- District: 2nd district of Muntinlupa
- Established: 1980

Government
  - Type: Barangay
  - Barangay Captain: Christine May Abas-Ding

Area
  - Total: 8.064 km^{2} (3.114 sq mi)

Population (2020)
  - Total: 71,075
  - Density: 8,814/km^{2} (22,830/sq mi)
- Time zone: UTC+8 (PST)
- Postal Code: 1799, 1781 (Filinvest City)
- Area code: 02
- Range: Marikina Valley Fault Ridge

Alabang ([alaˈbɐŋ]) is a barangay in Muntinlupa, Philippines. At one time, the area was a farming district and has since grown from a village to a major commercial center, including Filinvest City, Madrigal Business Park, and a transportation hub. It has an area of 8.064 square kilometers (3.114 sq mi). A large portion of Ayala Alabang came from Barangay Alabang. It was the location of the Alabang Stock Farm.

== Etymology ==
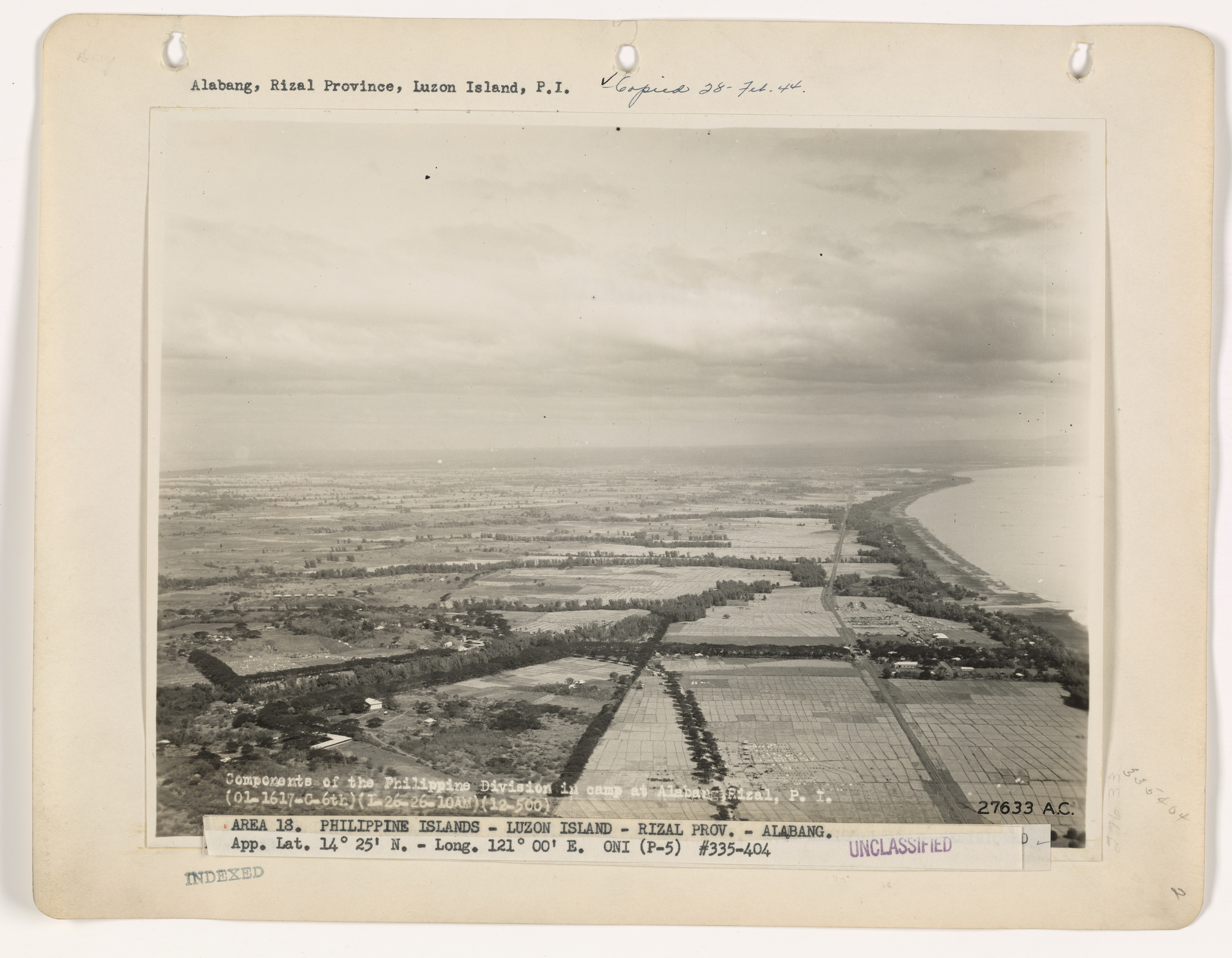
Aerial view of Alabang, circa 1944

Alabang was formerly the cattle grazing pastures of the hacienda of the friars of Muntinlupa. It is named after the Alabang River that passes through the area, labeled as "Rio de Alban" in the 1852 Coello-Morata Case Map.

== Demographics ==
| Year | Population |
|---|---|
| 2007 | 59,521 |
| 2010 | 56,752 |
| 2015 | 63,793 |
| 2020 | 71,075 |
| 2024 | 69,215 |

== Education ==
The Department of Education (DepEd) is responsible for basic education in the Philippines. The Commission on Higher Education (CHED) is responsible for Higher Education in the Philippines.

Schools located in the barangay are as follows:

- Alabang Elementary School
- Anima Christi Center for Learning and Human Development
- Far Eastern University Alabang
- Infant Jesus Learning Center - Alabang
- Le Sainte School
- Informatics College Northgate Alabang
- Liceo de Alabang, Inc.
- MIT International School
- Saint Bernadette College of Alabang
- Pedro E. Diaz High School
- Saint Francis of Assisi College
- Saint Peter School of Alabang
- San Roque Catholic School
- STI College (Alabang Branch)
- Theresiana de Montealegre Dame School

== In popular culture ==
Alabang appears in Philippine popular culture. The radio hit song "Alabang Girls" by Andrew E. was turned into a movie with the same name and featured the singer in the lead role. It was then turned into the Philippine television sitcom Alabang Girls (1992-1994) broadcast by ABC.

Another Philippine television show is The Alabang Housewives, a reality competition show broadcast by TV5.

== See also ==
- Muntinlupa
- Ayala Alabang
