= SM City San Pablo =

- The facade of SM City San Pablo in 2022.
- Location: San Pablo City, Philippines
- Coordinates: 14°04′17″N 121°18′06″E
- Address: Maharlika Highway, Riverina Residential and Commercial Estates, Brgy. San Rafael
- Opened: October 1, 2010; 16 years ago
- Previous names: SM Supercenter San Pablo (pre-opening, 2010)
- Developer: SM Prime Holdings
- Manager: SM Prime Holdings
- Architect: DA Abcede and Associates
- Num. of stores: 100+ as of 2017
- Num. of anchor tenants: 5
- Floor area: 60,776 m^{2} (654,190 sq ft)
- Floors: 2
- Parking: 600+ slots
- Public transit: Public Utility Jeep: Take San Pablo-Tanauan route or any signage with SM San Pablo
- Website: SM City San Pablo

SM City San Pablo is the 38th shopping mall owned by SM Prime Holdings. It is the 2nd SM Supermall in the province of Laguna. It is located at the entrance of Riverina Residential and Commercial Estates in Maharlika Highway, Barangay San Rafael, San Pablo City, and has a gross floor area of 60,776 square meters (654,190 sq ft).

== Design and interiors ==
Inside view of the mall.

SM City San Pablo has two levels and has over 100 shops. It has a semi-eye shaped atrium for events. The mall's atrium has perforated ceiling. SM City San Pablo's design team includes Design Associates Inc., mall designer; Jose Siao Ling and Associates, architects; DA Abcede and Associates, project manager; and DDT Konstract, general contractor.

== History ==
As early as 2008, SM Prime Holdings was planning to open SM Supercenter San Pablo (a downsized SM mall, originally) but this was shot down due to political pressures. After several attempts to build a similar establishment, SM Prime Holdings was given its go signal in July 2008 to push its construction ahead.

It was expected to be completed in August 2010, but due to strategic location and growing demands for commercial establishments in San Pablo, it was upgraded into SM City San Pablo on April 28, 2010.

The mall opened on October 1, 2010. The cinema commenced operations on December 3, 2010, ahead of the 36th Metro Manila Film Festival.

=== Recent expansions ===
==== Main Building (2010) ====
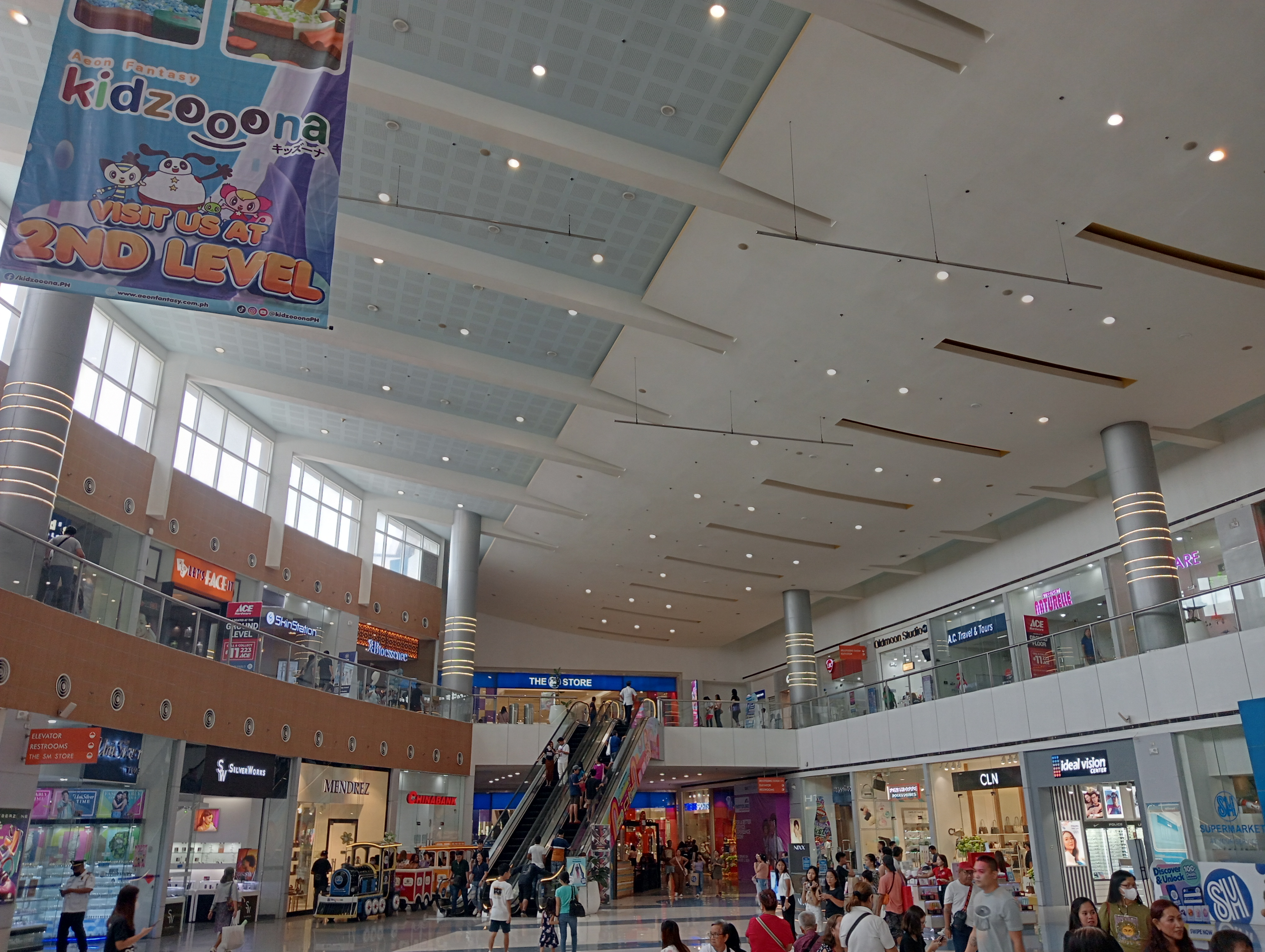
Interior of the mall

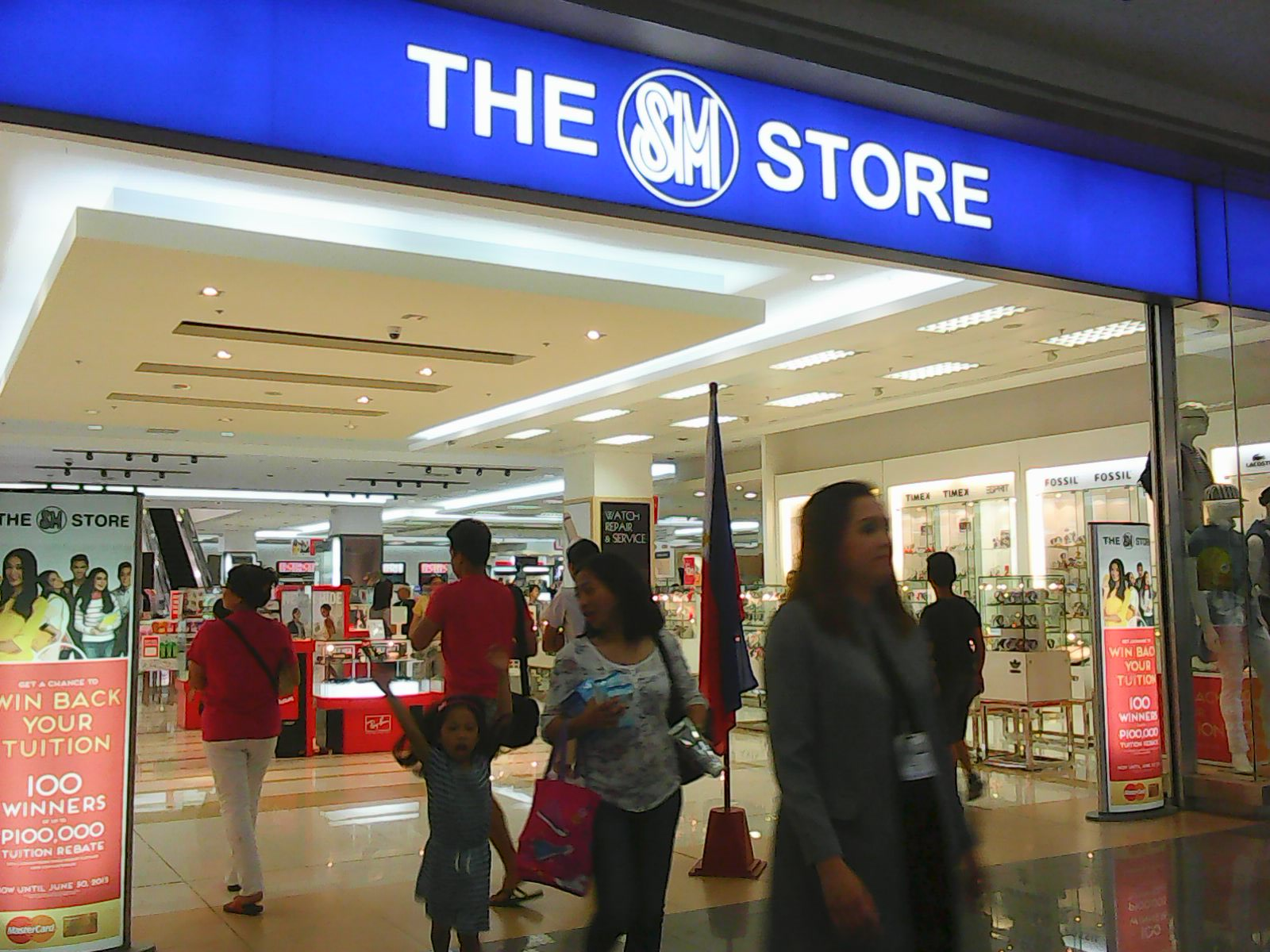
The SM Store San Pablo

An event venue with two floors is styled like a semi-eye-shaped atrium. It houses tenants like The SM Store and SM Supermarket.

==== Expansion (2016) ====
On October 28, 2016, the Cyberzone was completed and opened to the public. Along with it additional stores also opened including Yellow Cab, Starbucks, Oxygen and Mesa.

A new passport office of the Department of Foreign Affairs was inaugurated in October 2018 at the mall's second level.

==== BPO (TBA) ====
As of August 1, 2017, the BPO is still under construction. It can be seen near the mall's facade.

== Accidents/incidents ==
- In July 2010, during the mall's construction, 2 construction workers died and 7 others were injured when a scaffolding, on which three layers of metal pipes were also piled up, collapsed and hit the victims on site. This accident caused the delay of the mall's completion and opening.
- On July 16, 2014, the mall's facade was damaged due to Typhoon Glenda (Rammasun) that passed through Laguna.
- On June 25, 2016, a shootout happened at Blue Magic, a gift shop. It was later reported that the gunman escaped the mall without the guards noticing.
- On May 3, 2022, a criminal group called "termite gang" invaded the mall by accessing one of the nearby road's drainage system, no items were stolen in the incident.

== See also ==
- SM Supermalls
- San Pablo City, Laguna
- Laguna Province

Preceded by SM City Tarlac	38th SM Supermall; 2010	Succeeded by SM City Calamba
