= SM City Rosario =

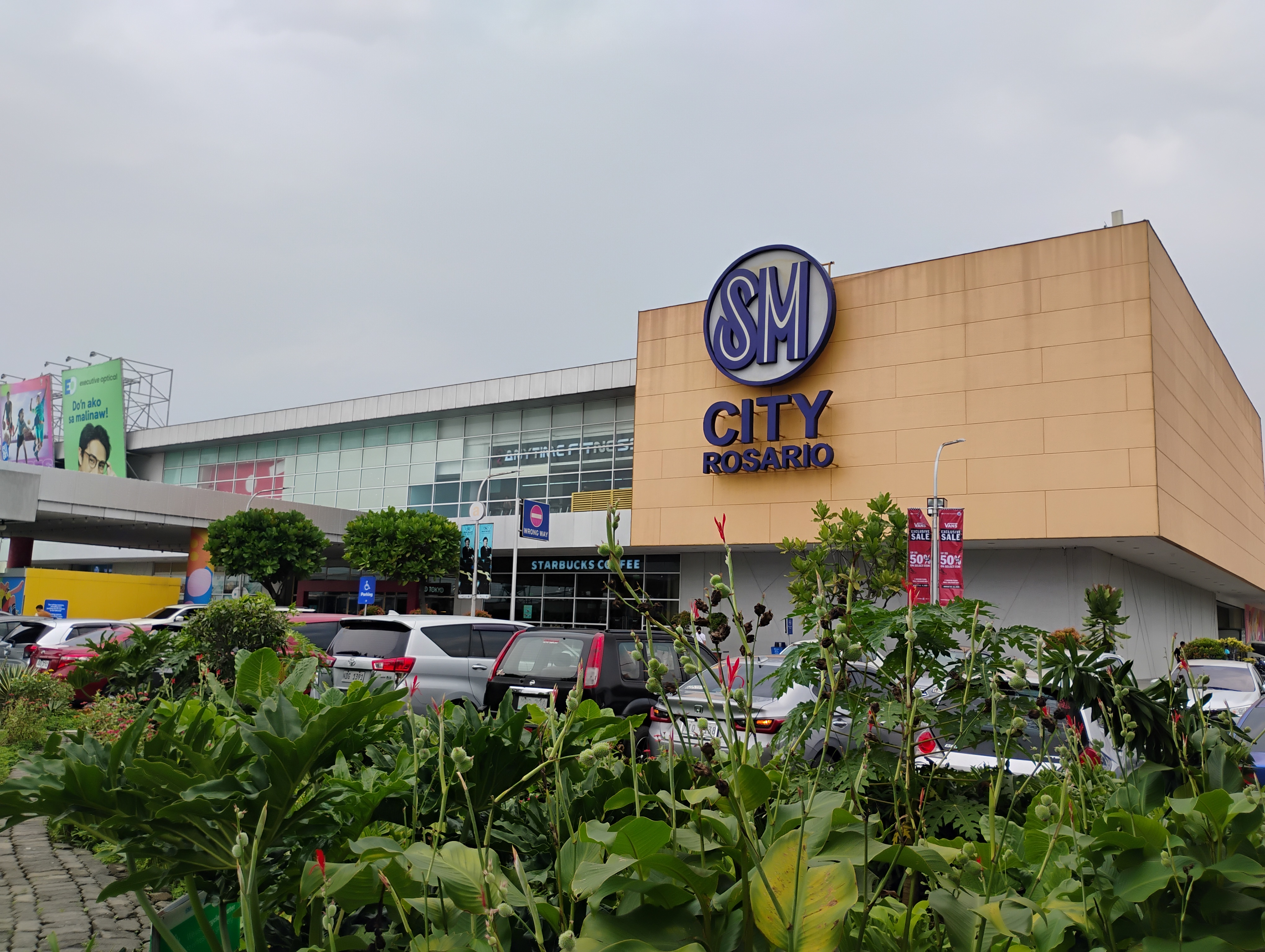
- The facade of SM City Rosario in 2025
- Location: Rosario, Cavite, Philippines
- Coordinates: 14°24′33″N 120°51′26″E
- Address: General Trias Drive cor. Costa Verde Access Road, Tejeros Convention
- Opened: November 20, 2009; 16 years ago
- Developer: SM Prime Holdings
- Manager: SM Prime Holdings
- Owner: Henry Sy, Sr.
- Num. of stores: 100+
- Num. of anchor tenants: 5
- Floor area: 57,559 m^{2} (619,560 sq ft)
- Floors: 2
- Parking: 500+ slots
- Website: SM City Rosario

SM City Rosario is a shopping mall which was developed and is owned by SM Prime Holdings. It opened on November 20, 2009 and is the fourth SM Supermall in the province of Cavite, Philippines. It is located at General Trias Drive cor. Costa Verde Access Road, Tejeros Convention, in the town of Rosario. It has a gross floor area of 58,000 square metres (620,000 sq ft).

== History ==
SM City Rosario facade in 2011

As early as 2008, SM Prime Holdings was considering to build a fourth mall in Cavite. The group considered building the mall on either Tagaytay or Trece Martires. The group decided against building the mall in either of the cities due to relatively low populations in both areas and searched for alternatives with higher population densities. The company decided to build the mall in Rosario. Rosario is known for its Tinapang Salinas and is home to Export Processing Zone Authority (EPZA), one of the largest industrial estates in the province. As they were finding a lot where the mall can be constructed, the municipal government offered them to buy the 5.5 hectare land right beside Petron Oil Depot and just near the entrance of EPZA. The group were then pleased by the location, just a right fit for a provincial mall which would be later known as SM City Rosario.

== Location ==
The mall complex is located along General Trias Drive in Rosario, Cavite. It is a 10-minute ride from the intersection of A. Soriano Highway in Bacao, which falls under the jurisdiction of the City of General Trias. The mall is just a 3-minute walk from the main gate of EPZA and 5-minute ride from the town proper.

== Mall features ==
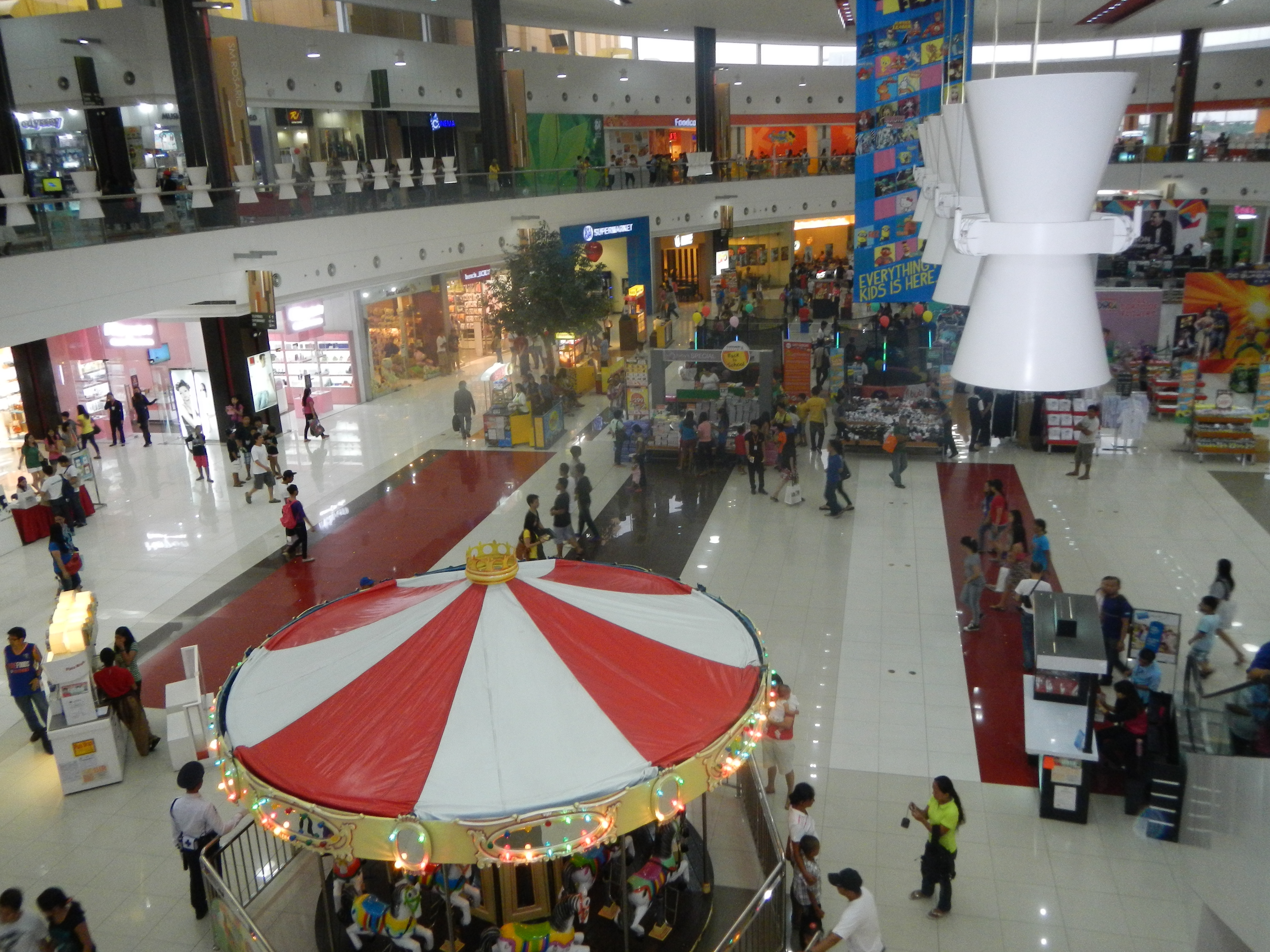
Interior of SM City Rosario

Like other SM Malls, it is a boxy-type building that features two levels. The food court (now replacing by Cyberzone) extends from the outside at the rear of the building. Parking spaces are available at the back of the mall. Its sister mall is SM City Novaliches, based on the building's interior and exterior template design but there are also some dissimilarities between the two: Rosario's exterior building color is yellow while Novaliches is yellow-green, and also the theme interiors of Rosario are hanging multiple stripped colors while Novaliches' interiors are hanging circular ceiling design.

Preceded by SM Center Las Piñas	36th SM Supermall; 2009	Succeeded by SM City Tarlac
