= SM City Tarlac =

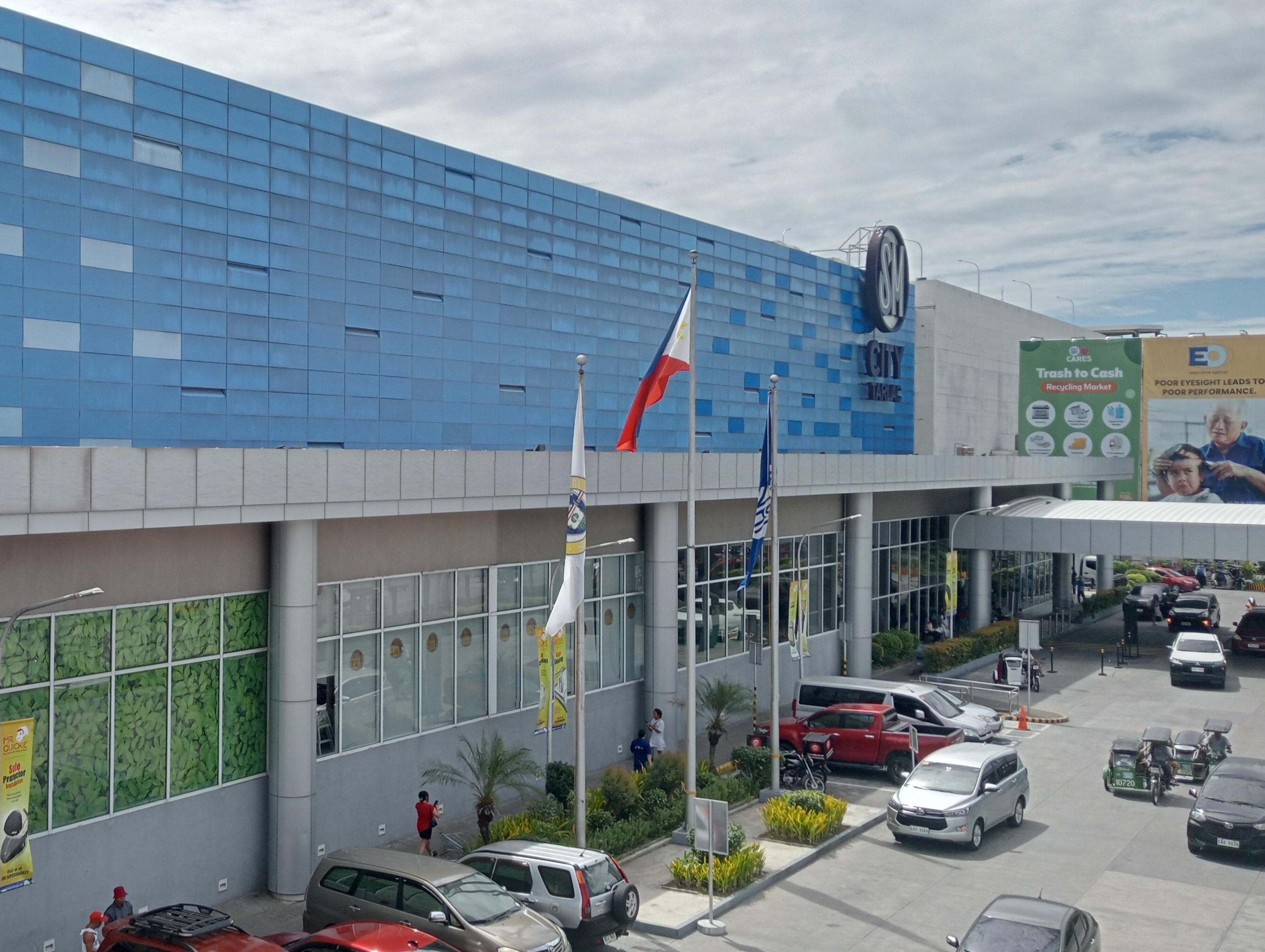
- The facade of SM City Tarlac in July 2024 before renovation
- Location: Tarlac City, Tarlac, Philippines
- Coordinates: 15°28′38″N 120°35′40″E
- Address: MacArthur Highway, Brgy. San Roque
- Opened: April 30, 2010; 16 years ago
- Developer: SM Prime Holdings
- Manager: SM Prime Holdings
- Num. of stores: 150+
- Num. of anchor tenants: 10
- Floor area: 103,340 m^{2} (1,112,300 sq ft)
- Floors: Main Building: 4; Parking Building: 6
- Parking: 1,000
- Website: SM City Tarlac

SM City Tarlac is a shopping mall owned by SM Prime Holdings. It is the first SM Supermalls in the province of Tarlac located in MacArthur Highway, Brgy. San Roque, Tarlac City, Tarlac, Philippines. The mall has a total floor area of 103,340 m^{2} (1,112,300 sq ft) on a 34,385 m^{2} (370,120 sq ft) land area. SM City Tarlac was opened to the public on April 30, 2010 after almost 2 years of planning and construction.

== Mall features ==
The 103,000 m^{2} (1,110,000 sq ft) mall has four levels. Its exteriors are built with colored metal cladding, glass portion on the sides of the skylight allows natural light to flow into the mall without the creation of heat, resulting not only in brighter and more spacious, but also more environmentally friendly interiors, the mall also has four cinemas as well as amusement areas.

SM City Tarlac has a six-story building adjacent and connected to the mall with five levels exclusively for parking. It will have about 1,000 slots for parking – 800 for cars and the rest for motorcycle and jeepney parking.

Preceded by SM City Rosario	37th SM Supermall; 2010	Succeeded by SM City San Pablo
