= Rosario, Cavite =

Municipality in Cavite, Philippines

Rosario Salinas Salinas-Marcella
- Municipality
- Municipality of Rosario
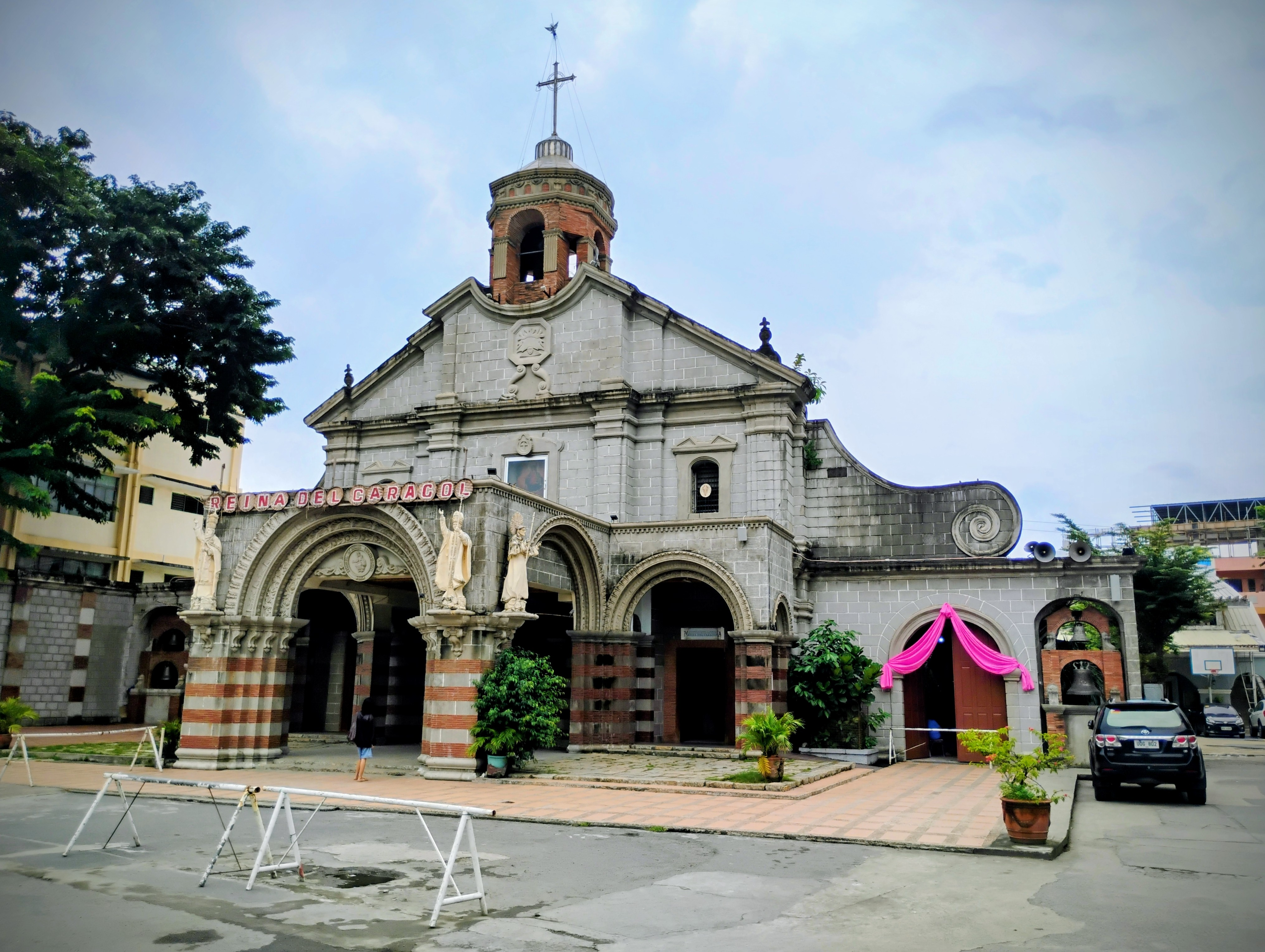
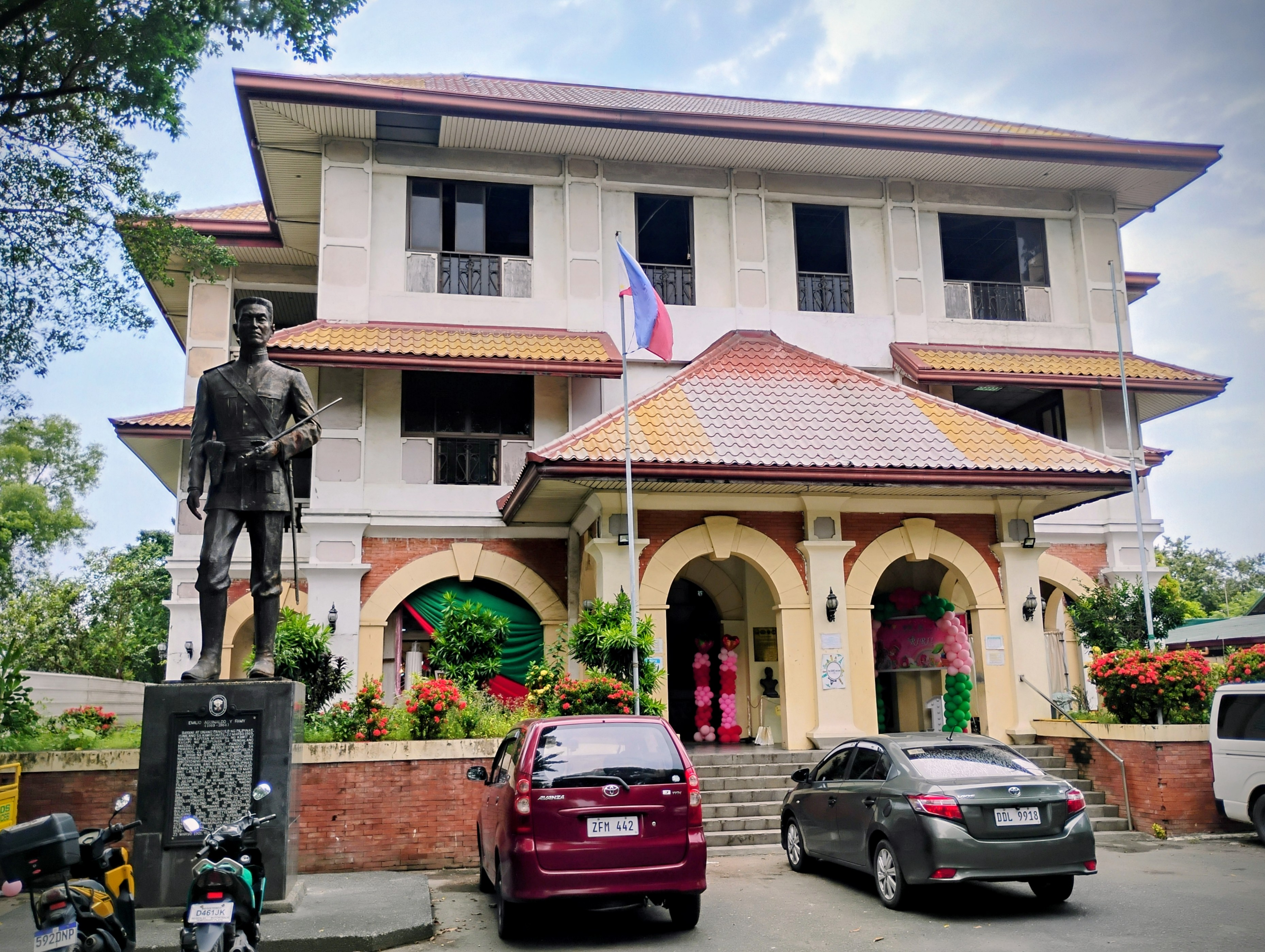
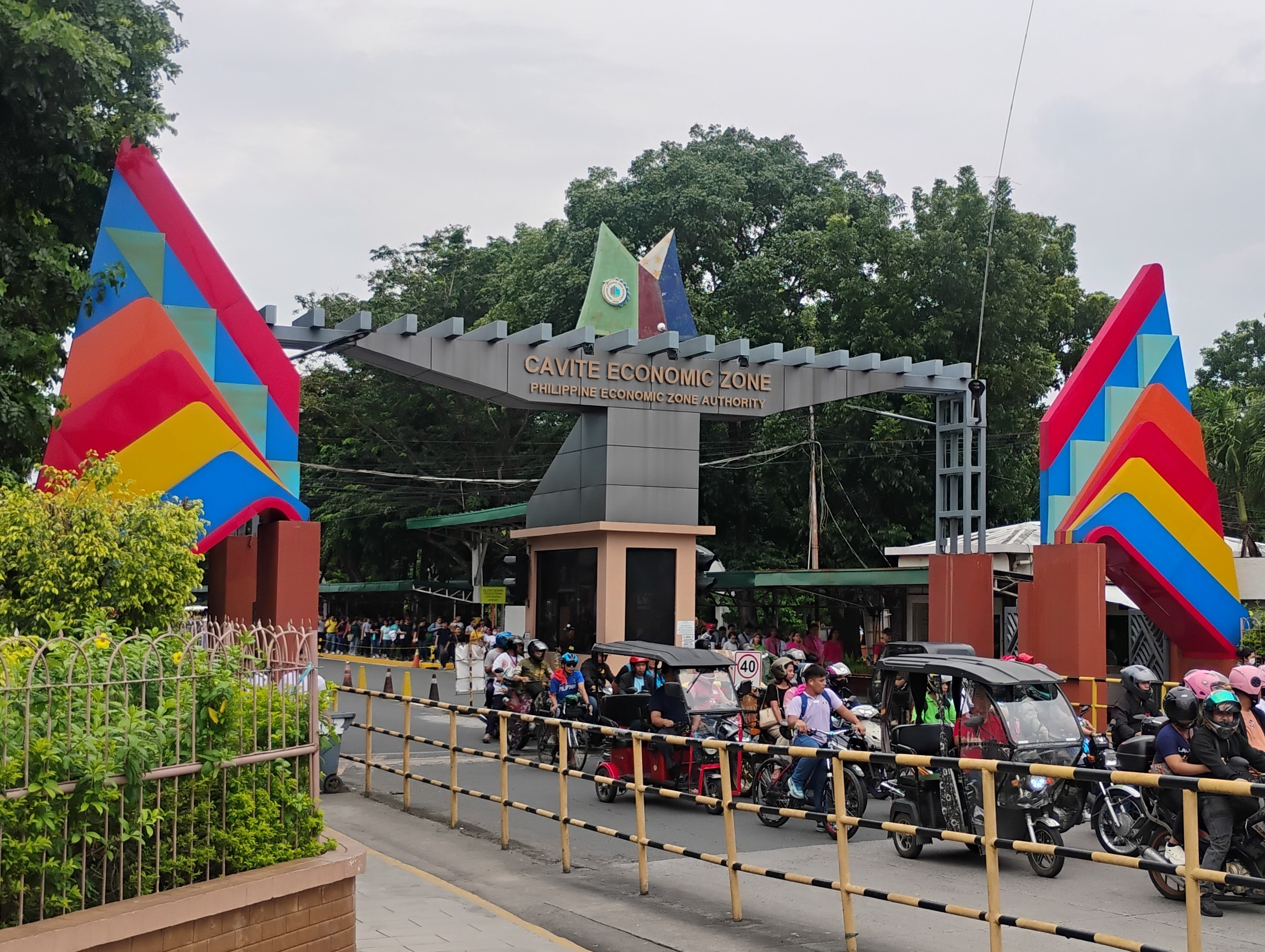
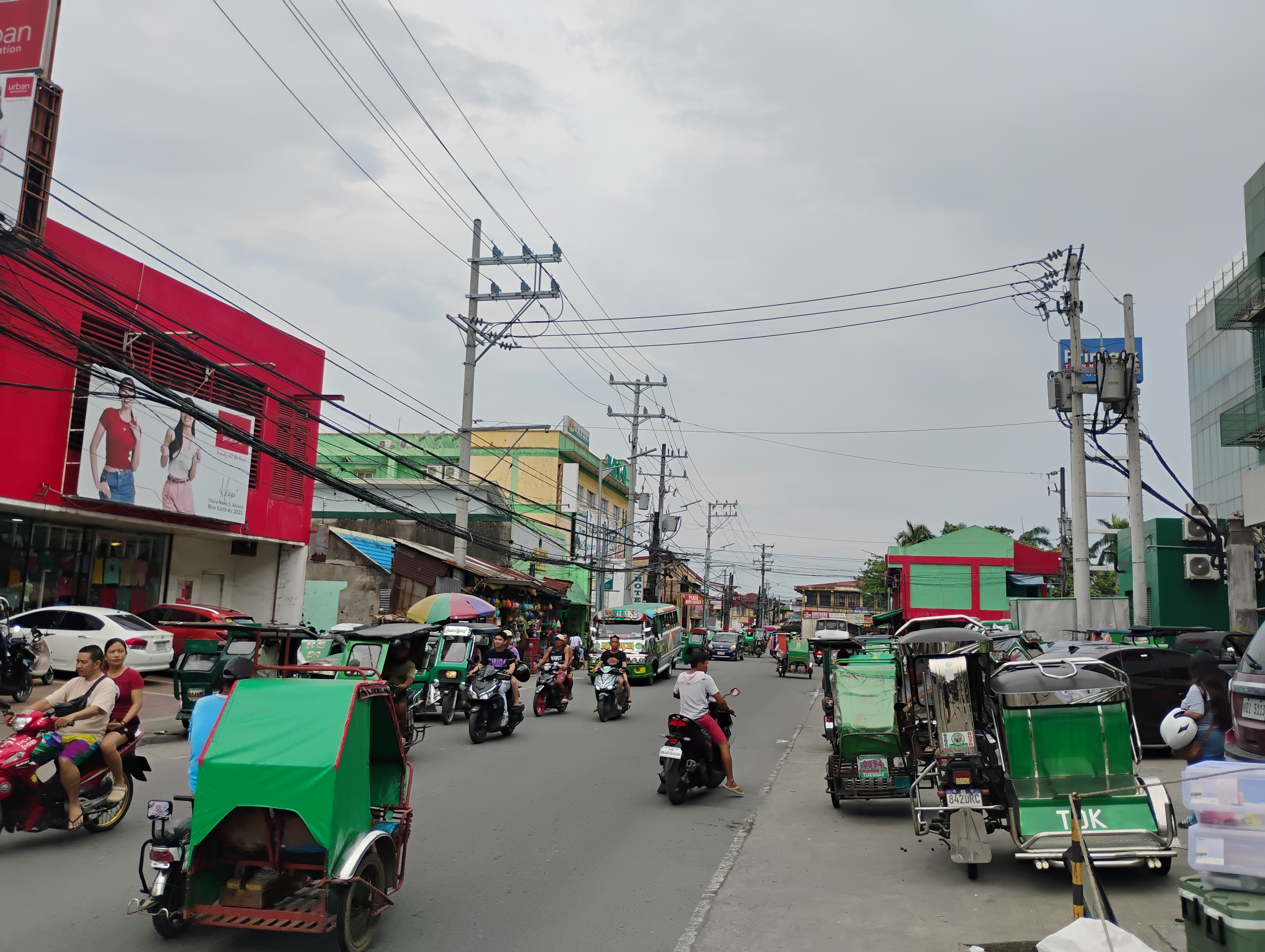
- Our Lady of the Most Holy Rosary Parish Church Rosario Municipal Hall Casa Hacienda de Tejeros Cavite Economic Zone Rosario Town Proper

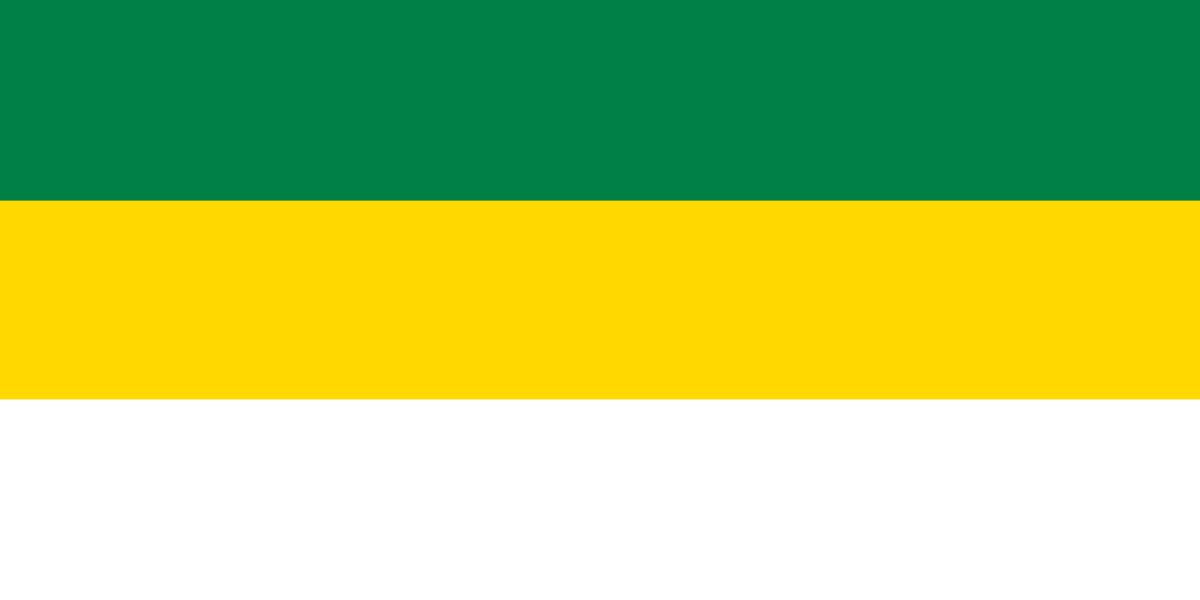
- Flag Seal
- Nickname: Home of the Famous and the Original Tinapang Salinas
- Anthem: Mahal ko ang Rosario
- Map of Cavite with Rosario highlighted
- Interactive map of Rosario
- Location within the Philippines
- Coordinates: 14°25′01″N 120°51′18″E
- Country: Philippines
- Region: Calabarzon
- Province: Cavite
- District: 1st district
- Founded: October 22, 1845
- Annexation to Noveleta: October 15, 1903
- Chartered: 1911
- Named for: Nuestra Señora del Santísimo Rosario
- Barangays: 20 (see Barangays)

Government
  - Type: Sangguniang Bayan
  - Mayor: Jose Voltaire V. Ricafrente III
  - Vice Mayor: Joanne Michelle B. Gonzales
  - Representative: Ramon Jolo Revilla
  - Municipal Council: Members: Mark Jay G. Velarde; Raul J. Hernandez; Vivian R. Andico; Christopher P. Go; Rolando A. Convento; Crisanto A. Nazareno; Michael E. del Rosario; Manuel C. Pueblo
  - Electorate: 89,496 voters (2025)

Area
  - Total: 7.61 km^{2} (2.94 sq mi)
- Elevation: 2.0 m (6.6 ft)
- Highest elevation: 35 m (115 ft)
- Lowest elevation: 0 m (0 ft)

Population (2024 census)
  - Total: 112,572
  - Density: 14,800/km^{2} (38,300/sq mi)
  - Households: 31,510

Economy
  - Income class: 1st municipal income class
  - Poverty incidence: 10.56% (2023)
  - Revenue: ₱ 851 million (2024)
  - Assets: ₱ 668.1 million (2024)
  - Expenditure: ₱ 555.6 million (2024)
  - Liabilities: ₱ 481.8 million (2024)

Service provider
  - Electricity: Manila Electric Company (Meralco)
  - Water: Rosario Water System & Maynilad Cavite
- Time zone: UTC+8 (PST)
- ZIP code: 4106
- PSGC: 0402117000
- IDD : area code: +63 (0)46
- Native languages: Tagalog
- Major religions: Roman Catholicism; Protestantism; Islam
- Catholic diocese: Diocese of Imus
- Patron saint: Our Lady of the Most Holy Rosary
- Website: www.rosariocavite.gov.ph

Rosario, officially the Municipality of Rosario (Tagalog: Bayan ng Rosario), is a municipality in the province of Cavite, Philippines. According to the 2024 census, it has a population of 112,572 people.

== Etymology ==
There are three religious versions for naming the town "Rosario." These are:

The first version says, the image of the Madonna and the Child was found one day floating on the water by a group of kids playing along the seashore. They played with the image, using it as a toy and afterwards hid it in the bushes near the sea. Every time they came back, however, they would see the image already floating leisurely on the water, as if waiting for them. They thought it strange, but could not explain how the image got back to the water.

Not long after their elders learned about the image and took it to an empty nipa shack. Thus began a public veneration of the Madonna and Child. The hut was transformed into a place of worship. News of miraculous happenings attributed to the image spread around. The religious fervor was so great and the people were moved by the image that they decided to adopt it as the patroness of the town and changed the name Salinas Marcella to Rosario.

The different names given to the town are remembered. Marcella exists as one of the national roads of the town. Salinas is associated with the finest and famous smoked fish (Tinapang Salinas) produced by the townspeople.

Rosario was formerly called Tejero, which may have originated from the word tejer (Spanish to weave) because weaving fish nets was then the main occupation of the women. Rosario was also called Salinas derived from the word sal (Spanish salt) during the Philippine Revolution because salt-making was a prime industry of the town. The place was likewise called Marcella or Marcelles due to its proximity to the sea (“mar” in Spanish). Rosario was, finally, named in honor of their patroness Nuestra Señora Virgen del Santissimo Rosario, Reina de Caracol or (Our Lady of the Most Holy Rosary).

== History ==
On October 22, 1845, Spanish Governor General Narciso Claveria promulgated a Decree for the establishment of a new town comprising Salinas-Leiton and Tierra Alta of San Francisco de Malabon, what is now the city of General Trias. On October 27, Don Juan Arlegui, Vicar-General of the Archdiocese of Manila informed the Politico-Military Governor of Cavite Don Miguel Roca, that he was designated by the Governor-General to look for a person of unquestionable integrity who will be entrusted with the money for the construction of the church building.

On November 3, 1845, presbyter Don Mamerto Mariano Ner, who was at that time one of the priests of the Curia of Manila, was appointed as the first parish priest and served until December 1866.

The municipality of Rosario was originally a part of San Francisco de Malabon (now General Trias) which itself was part of Silang. It became an independent municipality in 1846, one year after the founding of the Santissimo Rosario Parish.

On October 15, 1903, Rosario and Cavite El Viejo (now Kawit) were merged with Noveleta by virtue of Act No. 947 enacted by the Philippine Commission. In 1911, Rosario regained its independent status as a municipality of Cavite by virtue of Executive Order No. 92.

== Geography ==
Rosario is 30 kilometres (19 mi) south of Manila and 20 kilometres (12 mi) from Imus. It occupies part of the north to north-western section of the province along the western coast of Luzon. It is flanked by Noveleta on the east, Manila Bay on the north, General Trias on the southeast and Tanza on the south-west.

With the continuous expansion of Metro Manila, the municipality is now included in Manila conurbation which reaches Lipa, Batangas in its southernmost part. It is accessible by land and water transportation.

=== Land area ===
Rosario has a land area of 569 hectares (1,410 acres). A total of 20 barangays make up this lowland coastal town.

=== Climate ===
Climate data for Rosario, Cavite
Month	Jan	Feb	Mar	Apr	May	Jun	Jul	Aug	Sep	Oct	Nov	Dec	Year
Mean daily maximum °C (°F)	29 (84)	30 (86)	32 (90)	34 (93)	32 (90)	31 (88)	29 (84)	29 (84)	29 (84)	30 (86)	30 (86)	29 (84)	30 (87)
Mean daily minimum °C (°F)	21 (70)	20 (68)	21 (70)	22 (72)	24 (75)	25 (77)	24 (75)	24 (75)	24 (75)	23 (73)	22 (72)	21 (70)	23 (73)
Average precipitation mm (inches)	10 (0.4)	10 (0.4)	12 (0.5)	27 (1.1)	94 (3.7)	153 (6.0)	206 (8.1)	190 (7.5)	179 (7.0)	120 (4.7)	54 (2.1)	39 (1.5)	1,094 (43)
Average rainy days	5.2	4.5	6.4	9.2	19.7	24.3	26.9	25.7	24.4	21.0	12.9	9.1	189.3
Source: Meteoblue

=== Barangays ===
Rosario is politically subdivided into 20 barangays, as indicated below. Each barangay consists of puroks and some have sitios.

- Bagbag I
- Bagbag II
- Kanluran
- Ligtong I
- Ligtong II
- Ligtong III
- Ligtong IV
- Muzon I
- Muzon II
- Poblacion
- Sapa I
- Sapa II
- Sapa III
- Sapa IV
- Silangan I
- Silangan II
- Tejeros Convention
- Wawa I
- Wawa II
- Wawa III

== Demographics ==
Population census of Rosario
Year	Pop.	±% p.a.
1903	6,601	—
1918	7,117	+0.50%
1939	9,894	+1.58%
1948	11,894	+2.07%
1960	16,227	+2.62%
1970	23,817	+3.91%
1975	28,725	+3.83%
1980	33,312	+3.01%
1990	45,405	+3.15%
1995	54,086	+3.33%
2000	73,665	+6.85%
2007	94,228	+3.45%
2010	92,253	−0.77%
2015	110,706	+3.53%
2020	110,807	+0.02%
2024	112,572	+0.38%
Source: Philippine Statistics Authority

In the 2024 census, the population of Rosario was 112,572 people, with a density of 3,000 inhabitants per square kilometer or 7,800 inhabitants per square mile.

Rosario's potential labor force comprises 59.25% of the figure given above, with the majority engaged in fishing and trade activities. The growth rate is 3.63%.

=== Religion ===
Roman Catholicism is the prominent religion of Rosario. There are two Catholic churches. One is in Poblacion, The Most Holy Rosary Parish, and another one in Ligtong, San Isidro Labrador Parish. Recently, Islam was introduced by the Maranao business people from Mindanao. The other religions in Rosario includes Iglesia ni Cristo and Born Again Christians.

== Economy ==
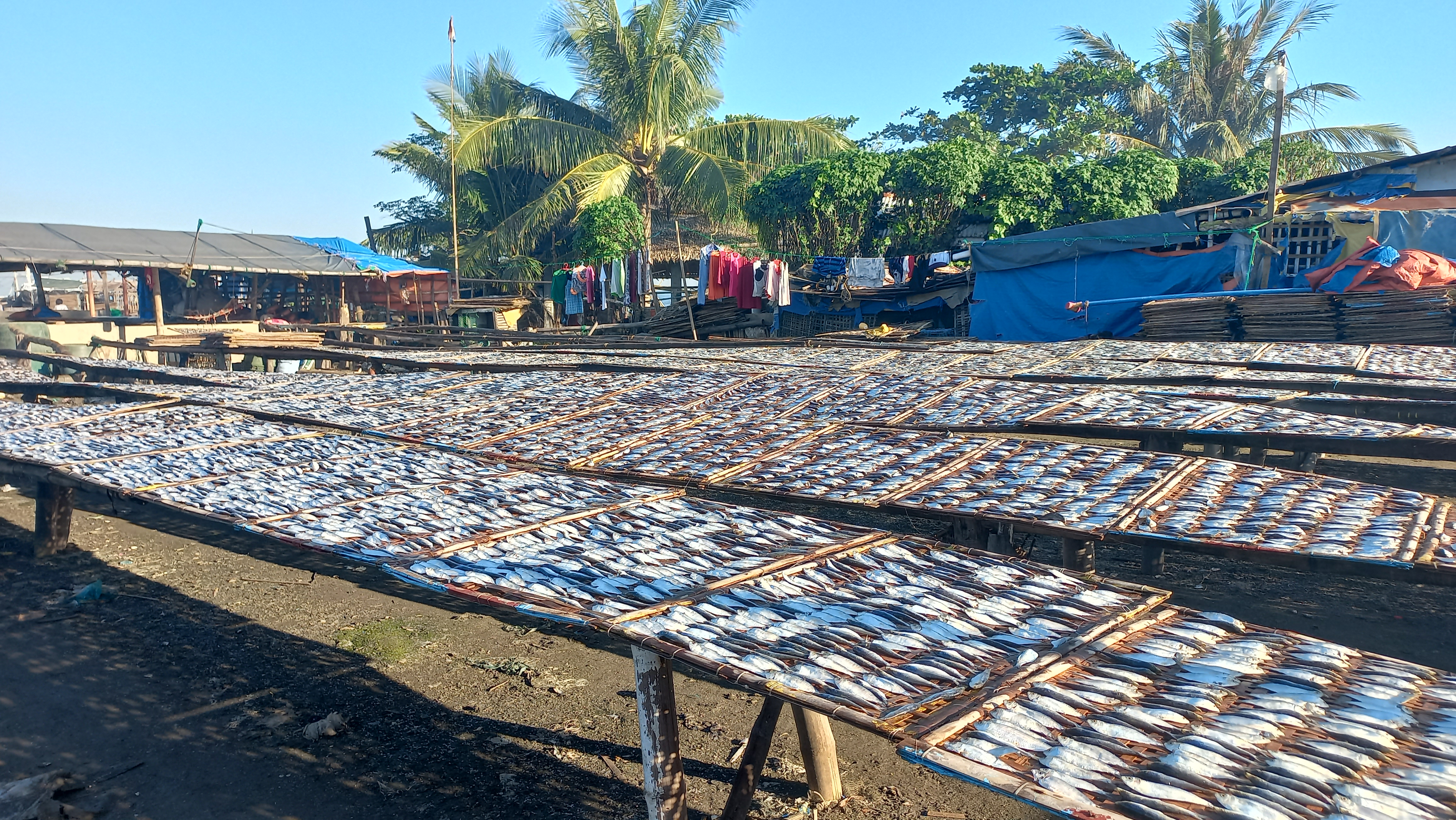
Tinapa being dried up under the Sun in Barangay Wawa Dos

SM City Rosario, the 4th SM mall in Cavite.

Fishing is a major economic activity due to the abundant fishing grounds particularly in Barangays Wawa I, II, Sapa II, III, Muzon I, II, Ligtong I and IV. The Rosario Fish Port in Barangay Sapa II is a major fishing port. Predominant cottage industries related to fishing include smoked fish (tinapa) processing, fish drying (daing), fish paste (bagoong) making, fish sauce (patis) making and canning. Marine species caught within municipal fishing grounds include squid, mackerel, slipmouth, herring, goatfish, tuna, mullet, porgy, shrimp, barracuda, cavalla, snapper, catfish and roundscad. Salinas is also the birthplace of the well-known Marina’s bibingka and the local Cavite version of pansit luglog, also known as pansit palabok, which was introduced by Aling Ely’s carinderia. Both uses the local ingredients of tinapa flakes and kesong puti otherwise known as casillo.

Since the early 2000s, the Fil-Oil Development and Management Corporation (FMDC) has been developing 134 hectares (330 acres) of its parent company Philippine National Oil Corporation property into a special economic zone, the Cavite Economic Zone, that will include an industrial estate, low-cost housing, and a new port facility. A proposed reclamation will increase the land area of Barangay Sapa II and III by 200 hectares (490 acres).

On November 20, 2009, SM Prime Holdings, the largest mall-operator in the country, opened SM City Rosario, its 36th mall.

The Taiwanese steel fastener manufacturing company Lu Chu Shin Yee owns a factory in Rosario called Rosario Fasteners Corp. (formerly Lu Chu Shin Yee Works Philippines Corp.), established in 1988.

Poverty incidence of Rosario (%)

Source: Philippine Statistics Authority

== Government ==
=== Elected officials ===
The following are the elected officials of the town elected last 2025 elections which serves from June 30, 2025 until June 30, 2028:

Position	Official
Mayor	Jose Voltaire V. Ricafrente (PDPLBN)
Vice Mayor	Joanne Michelle "BAMM" B. Gonzales (PDPLBN)

Sangguniang Bayan Members	Party
Raul J. Hernandez	PDPLBN
Vivian R. Andico	PDPLBN
Christopher P. Go	PDPLBN
Arrel C. Convento	PDPLBN
Crisanto A. Nazareno	PDPLBN
Michael E. Del Rosario	PDPLBN
Manuel C. Pueblo	PDPLBN
Michael H. Giongco	PDPLBN
ABC President	John Paul L. Nazareno
SK Federation President	Reina Maric Solis

=== List of former municipal heads ===
Gobernadorcillos

- 1845 - Jacinto Jimenez
- 1846 - Pablo Buendia
- 1847 - Ventura Caldeira
- 1848 - Jacinto Jimenez
- 1849 - Adriano Zacarias
- 1850 - Reducindo Cruz
- 1851 - Pablo Buendia
- 1852 - Jacinto Jimenez
- 1853 - Reducindo Buenviaje
- 1854 - Roberto Jimenez
- 1855 - Lino Ner
- 1856 - Lino Ner
- 1857 - Benito Atangan
- 1858 - Isidoro Gonzales
- 1859 - Natalio Buenaflor
- 1860 - Tomas Panganiban
- 1861-1862 - Isidoro Gonzales
- 1863-1864 - Lino Ner
- 1865-1866 - Bernabe Raqueno
- 1867-1868 - Lino Ner
- 1869-1870 - Juan Buendia
- 1871-1872 - Benito Atangan
- 1873-1874 - Basilio Copon
- 1875-1877 - Lino Ner
- 1878-1879 - Bernabe Raqueño
- 1880-1881 - Mariano Odvina
- 1882-1883 - Francisco Prudente
- 1884-1885 - Ciriaco Abutin
- 1886-1887 - Pantaleon Raqueño
- 1888- - Francisco Sales
- 1889-1890 - Mariano Punzalan
- 1891-1892 - Pablo Raqueño

Capitan Presidents

- 1893 - Roman Bulda
- 1894 Marcelo Rodriguez
- 1895-1898 - Catalino Abueg

Presidente Municipal

- 1899-1900 - Catalino Abueg
- 1901-1905 - Andres Ner
- 1906-1907 - Benigno Santi
- 1908-1909 - Andres Villanueva
- 1910-1912 - Andres J. Giongco
- 1913-1915 - Pascual Jimenez
- 1915-1922 - Julio K. Mata
- 1922-1925 - Andres J. Giongco
- 1925-1930 - Julio K. Mata
- 1930-1934 - Narciso Jimenez Ner

Municipal Mayors

- 1934-1937 - Julio K. Mata
- 1938-1941 - Jose Castro
- 1942-1943 - Agustin Abadilla

Japanese sponsored Mayor

- 1944-1945 - Julio K. Mata

Liberation Military Mayor

- 1945 - Narciso Jimenez Ner

Appointed by Pres. Osmena

- 1946 - David P. Jimenez

Appointed by Pres. Roxas

- 1947 - Julio K. Mata

Municipal Mayor

- 1948-1951 - David P. Jimenez
- 1952-1959 - Antonio E. Guhit
- 1960-1963 - Pedro R. Giongco
- 1964–1978, 1980-1986 - Calixto D. Enriquez
- 1978-1980 - Agripina Y. Abueg
- 1986-1988 - Oscar F. Reyes
- 1988-1992 - Ernesto S. Andico
- 1992–1998, 2007–2016, 2019–2020 - Jose M. Ricafrente, Jr.
- 1998-2007 - Renato M. Abutan
- 2016–2019, 2020–present - Jose Voltaire V. Ricafrente

== Education ==
The Rosario Schools District Office governs all educational institutions within the municipality. It oversees the management and operations of all private and public, from primary to secondary schools.

=== Primary and elementary schools ===
- Agustin Abadilla Elementary School
- Bagbag Elementary School
- Bible Christian Academy
- David P. Jimenez Elementary School
- Galilee Academy
- King Arthur Academy
- Ligtong Elementary School
- Rosario Elementary School
- Rosario Institute
- Santo Rosario Catholic School
- Silangan Elementary School
- Tejeros Convention Elementary School

=== Secondary schools ===
- Bagbag National High School
- Bible Christian Academy
- Cafuir Learning Center (defunct)
- Cavite State University - CCAT Campus Laboratory Science High School
- Escuela Secondaria Señor de Salinas
- Galilee Academy
- Rosario Institute
- Rosario National High School
- Santo Rosario Catholic School
- STI - Rosario (High School Department)

=== Higher educational institutions ===
- Cavite State University - CCAT Campus
- Datacom Institute of Computer and Technology
- Imus Computer College - Rosario Branch
- STI College - Rosario Branch

== Notable people ==
- Nemesio Prudente - Educator/Activist
- Roxanne Guinoo - Actress
- Tomboy Bibo - Comedian/Influencer

== Gallery ==
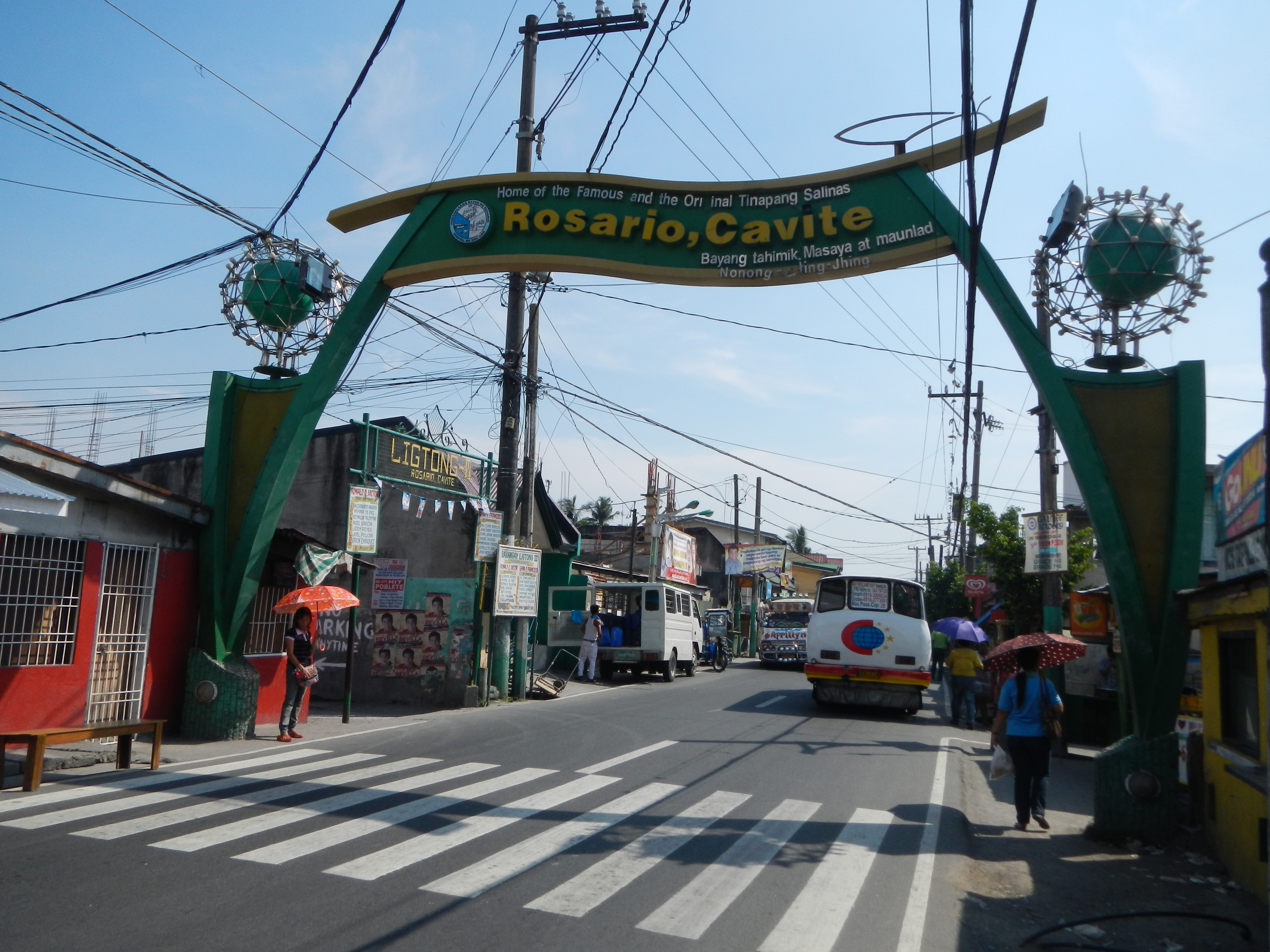
Welcome arch

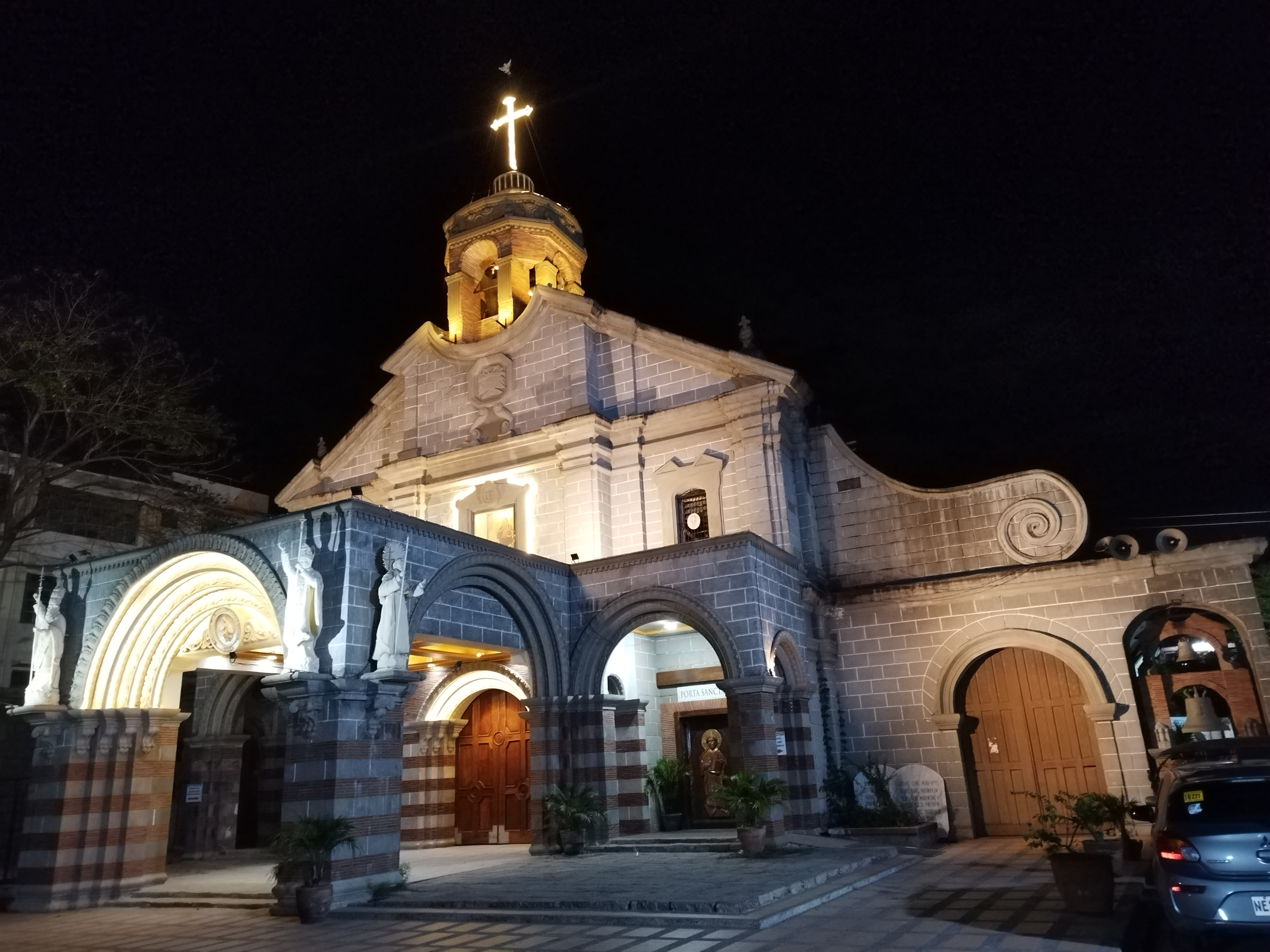
Our Lady of the Most Holy Rosary Church

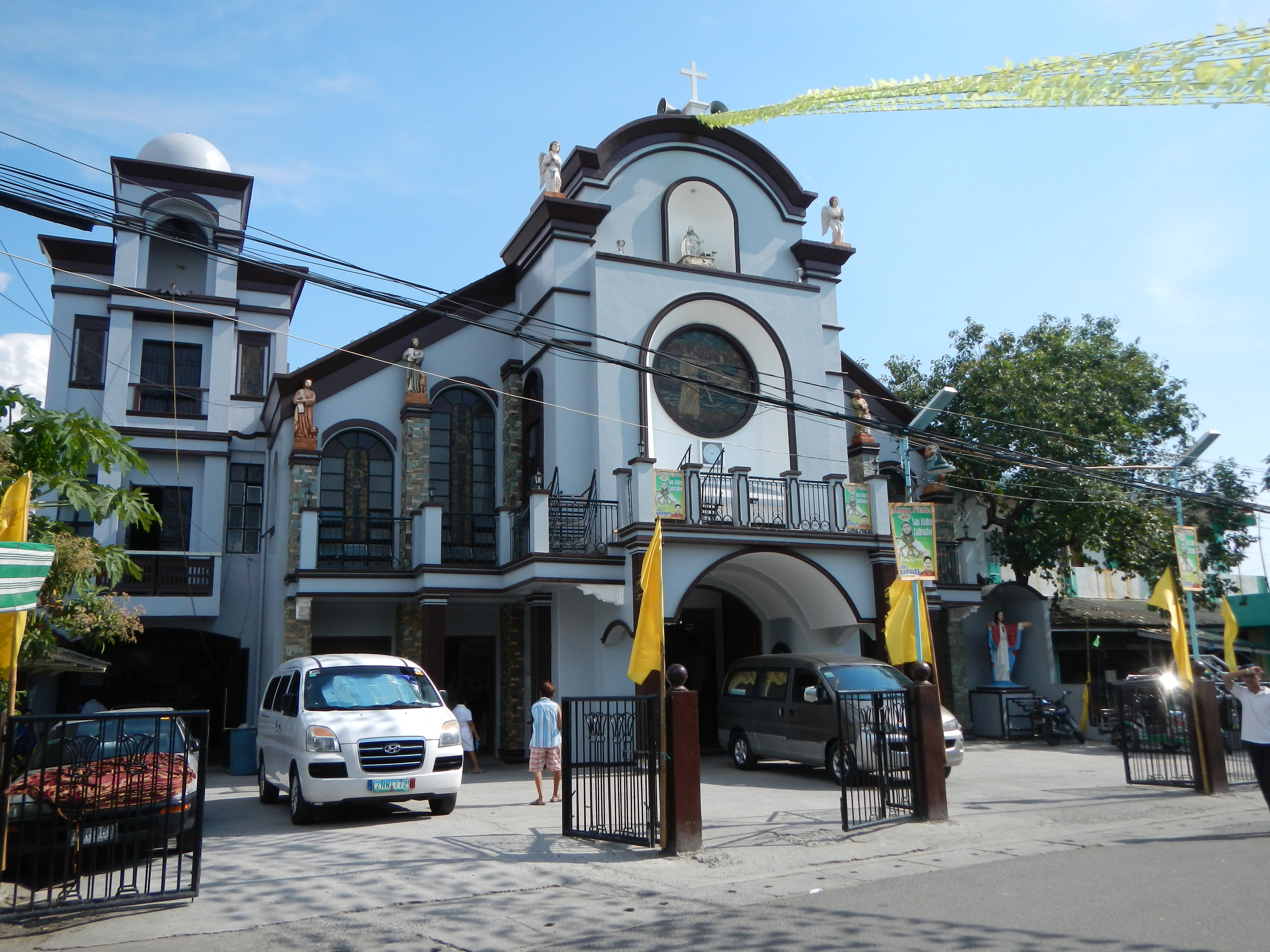
San Isidro Labrador Parish Church

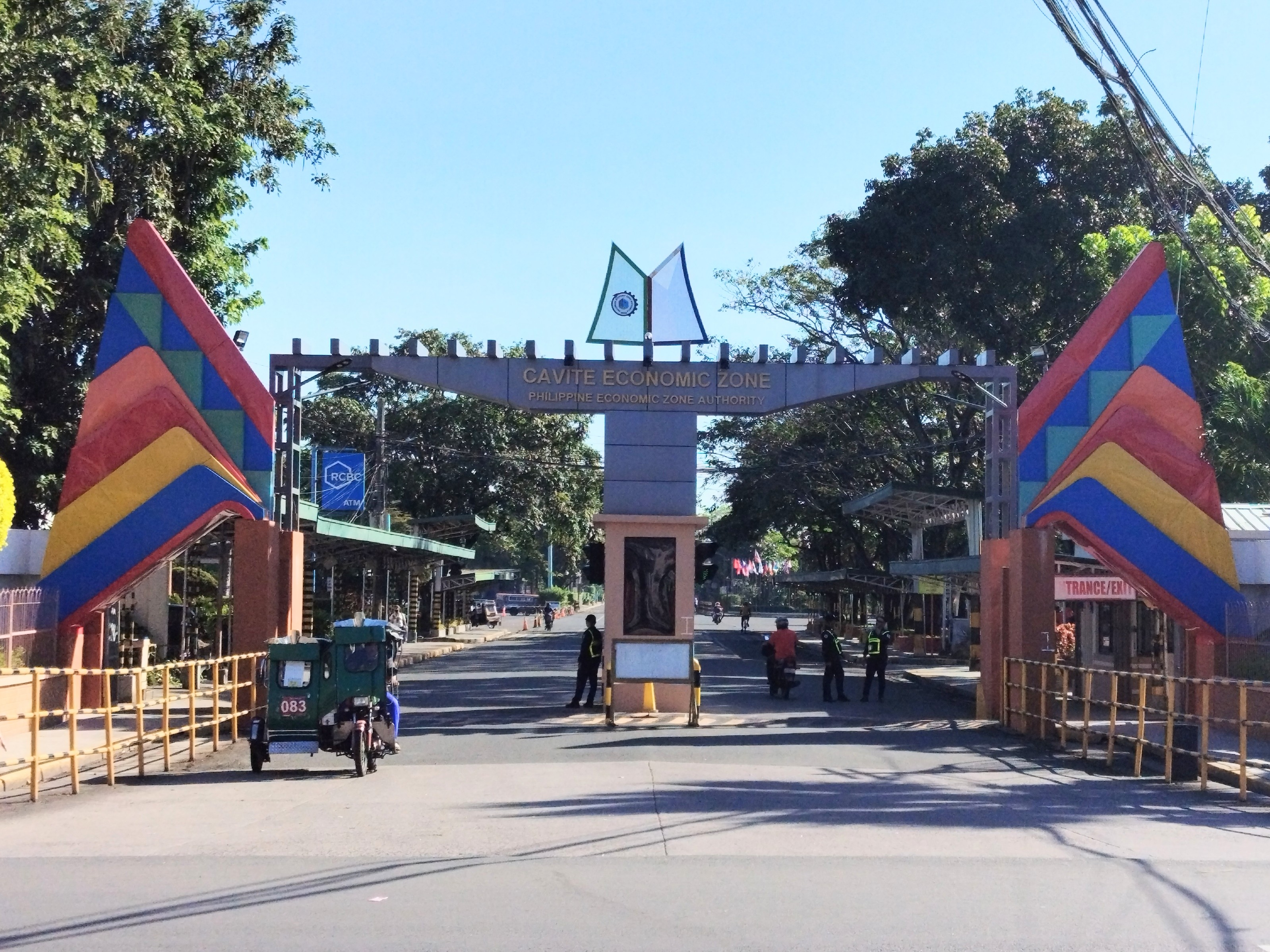
Cavite Economic Zone

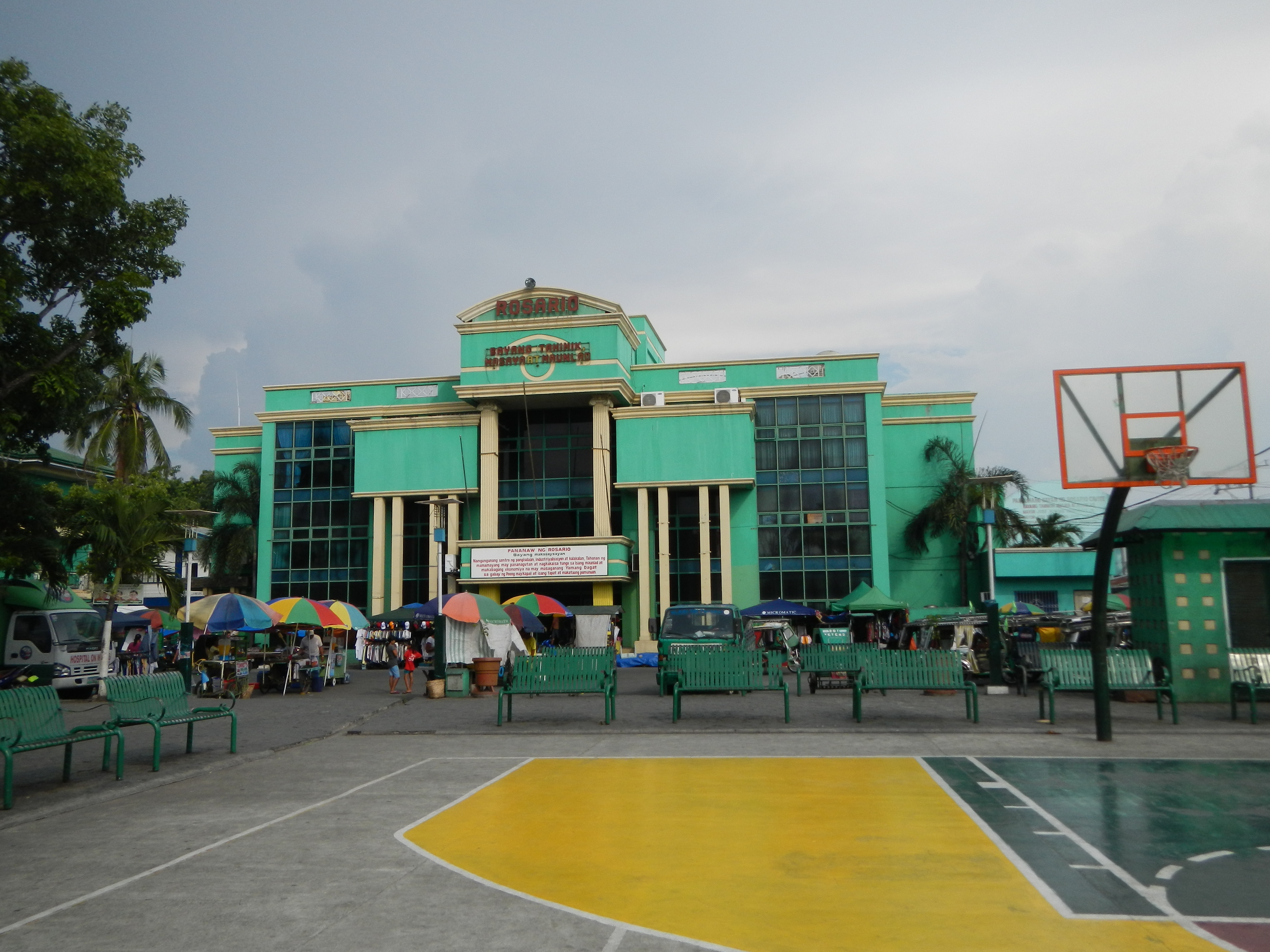
Former Town hall

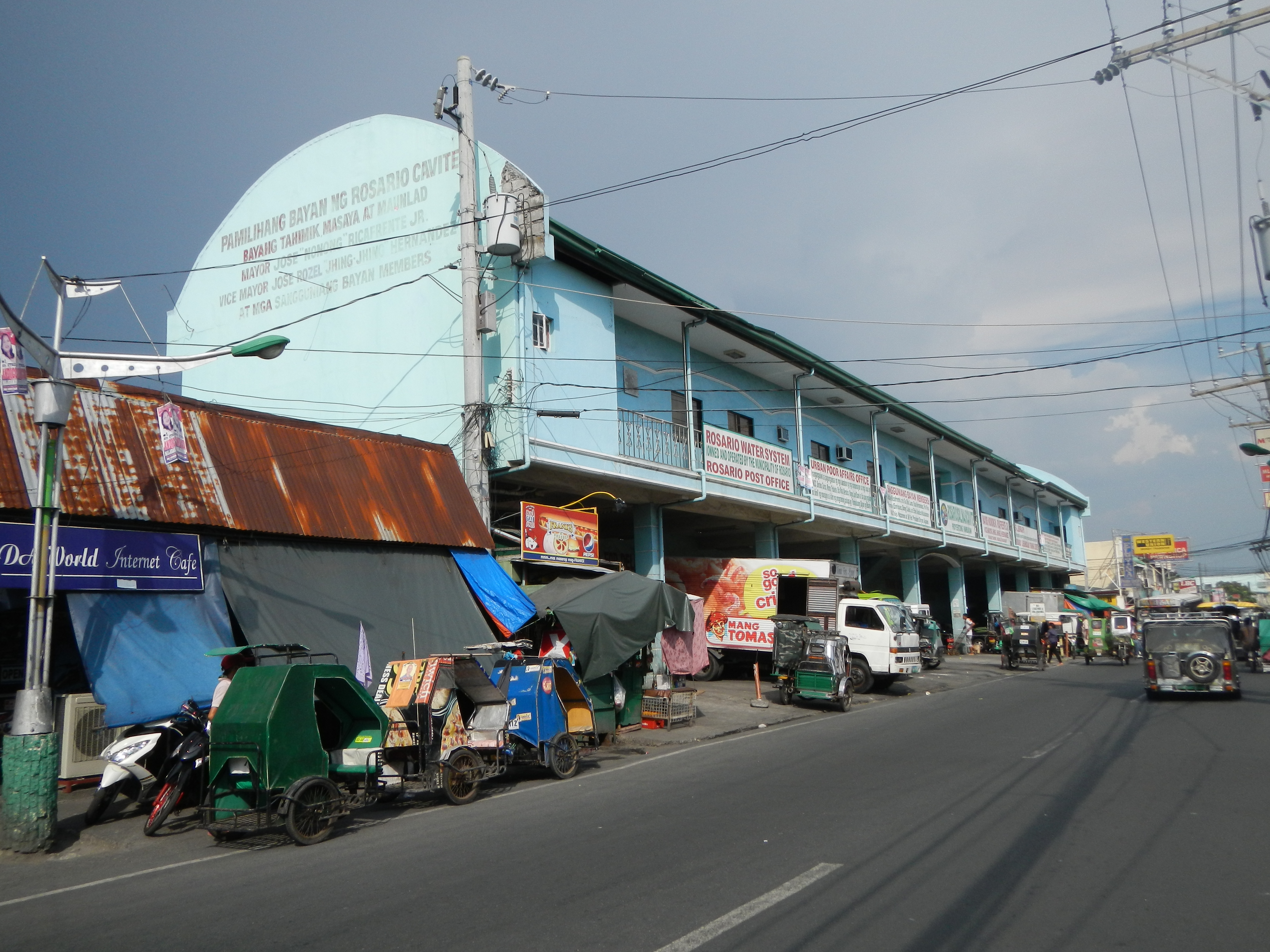
Former Rosario commercial center
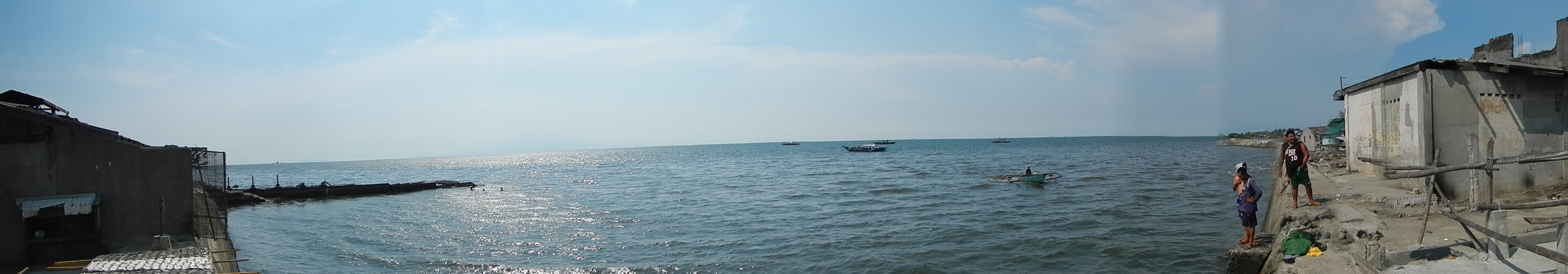
Fish port

== See also ==
- List of renamed cities and municipalities in the Philippines
