= Our Lady of the Most Holy Rosary, Queen of the Caracol =

Patroness of Rosario, Cavite

Our Lady of the Most Holy Rosary, Queen of the Caracol Nuestra Señora del Santísimo Rosario Reina del Caracol Mahal na Birhen ng Santo Rosaryo, Reyna ng Karakol
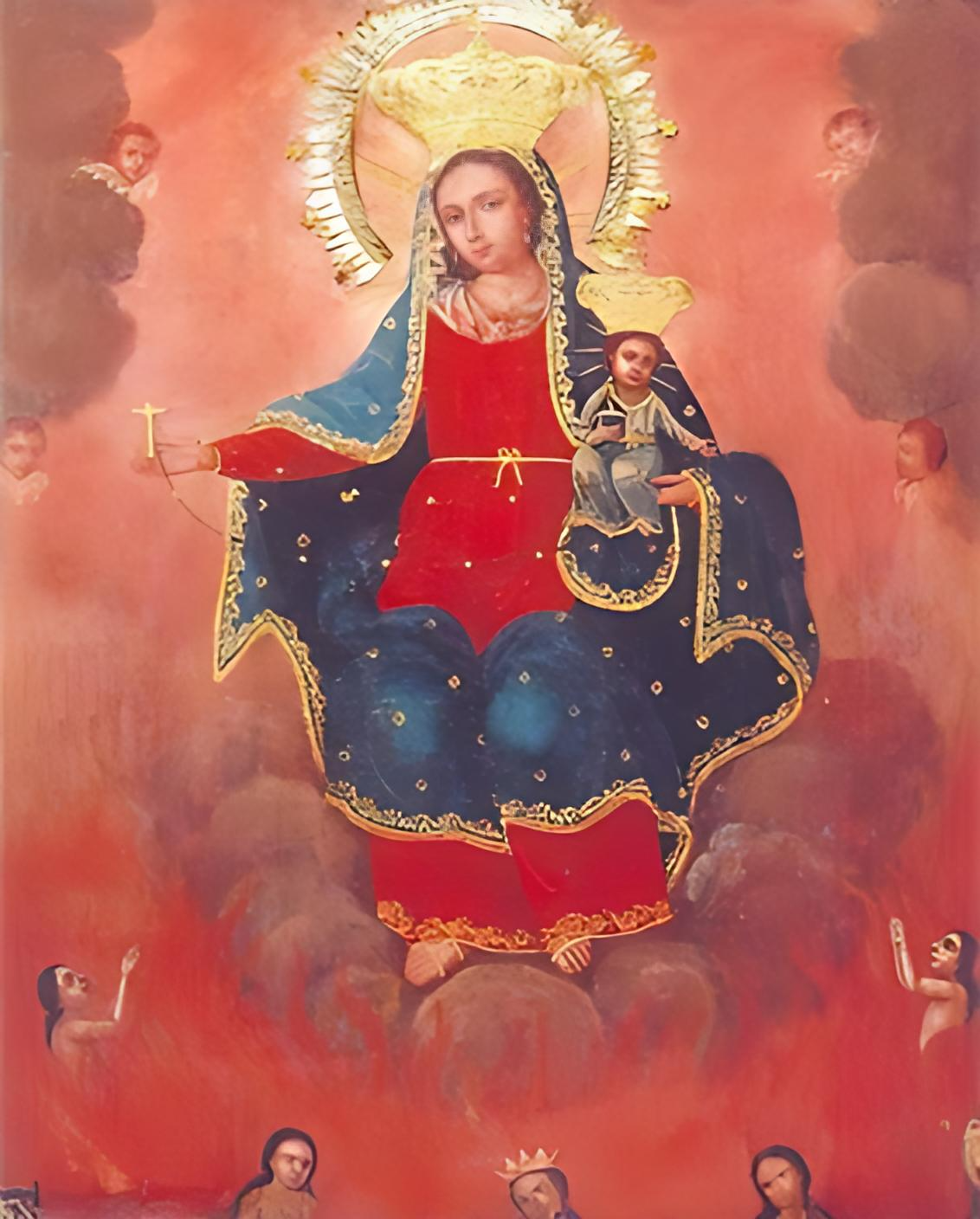
- The original icon of Our Lady of the Rosary
- Location: Rosario, Cavite, Philippines
- Date: 1810 or 1820
- Witness: Unnamed man
- Type: Marian icon
- Approval: Pope Francis — Canonical coronation (2025)
- Venerated in: Catholic Church
- Shrine: Diocesan Shrine of Our Lady of the Most Holy Rosary - Reina del Caracol, Rosario, Cavite, Philippines
- Patronage: Rosario, Cavite; Barangay Daang Amaya, Tanza, Cavite
- Attributes: Painting of Virgin Mary and the Child Jesus enthroned in clouds, with a royal regalia, a rosary, and baton
- Feast day: Third Sunday after Easter; First Sunday of October

Our Lady of the Most Holy Rosary, Queen of the Caracol, (Spanish: Nuestra Señora del Santísimo Rosario Reina del Caracol, Filipino: Mahal na Birhen ng Santo Rosaryo, Reyna ng Karakol) also known as Reina del Caracol is a title of Mary, mother of Jesus and infant Jesus, the Virgin of Santísimo Rosario is a venerated Marian icon associated to the Our Lady of the Most Holy Rosary. The town of Rosario in the Province of Cavite consider her as its patroness.

== Description ==
The icon is a painting of the Blessed Virgin Mary depicted as Our Lady of the Most Holy Rosary. Mary, in blue and red clothes, seems to be sitting on clouds above an image that appears to be purgatory. In her left arm, she carries the Infant Jesus and in her right hand, the cross of a 15 decade rosary. The Infant Jesus is garbed in a light blue attire. In his right hand he holds a globe with a cross on top symbolizing his role as protector of the earth. In his right left hand he holds one end of the rosary.

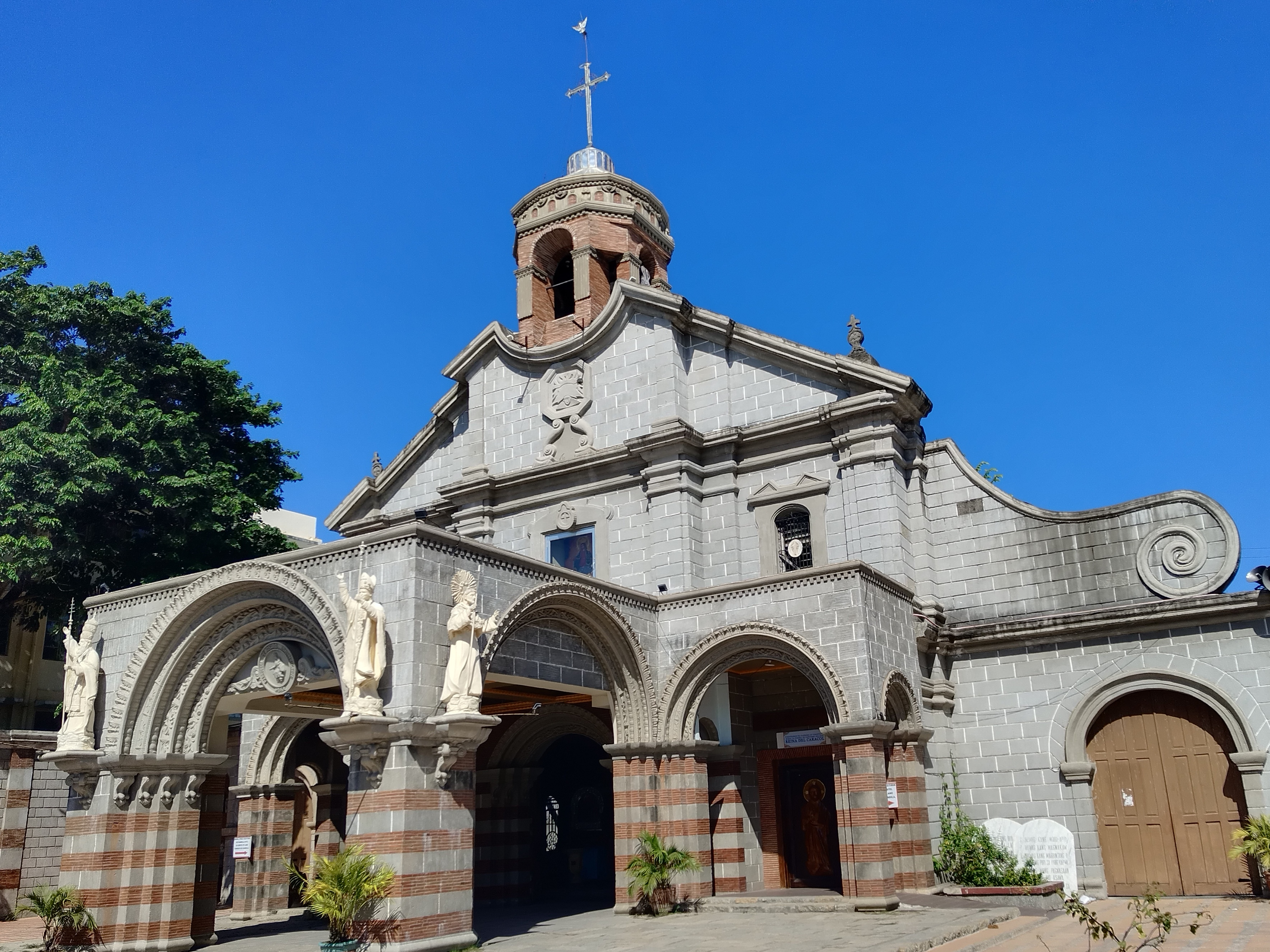
Our Lady of the Most Holy Rosary Parish Church where the Marian image is enshrined

The icon of the Our Lady of the Most Holy Rosary, Queen of the Caracol is painted on canvas and framed in wood with silver adornments of grapes and vines. The painting is set with gold accouterments. It is enthroned at the altar of the Parish of the Most Holy Rosary, also known as the Rosario Church, in the town of Rosario.

== History ==
Rosario is a coastal town in the province of Cavite along the shores of Manila Bay. It was formerly a barrio (barangay) of San Francisco de Malabón (now General Trias). It was then called Salinas-Marcella for its salt evaporation industry. Marcella, on the other hand, comes from the Spanish word mar (sea). However, before the twilight of the Spanish era its name was changed to Rosario in honor of the Virgen del Rosario del Caracol, the patroness of the place. How and when the Virgin arrived is not known; a plausible origin story comes from prominent residents Don Catalino Abueg and Doña Rosa Ner.

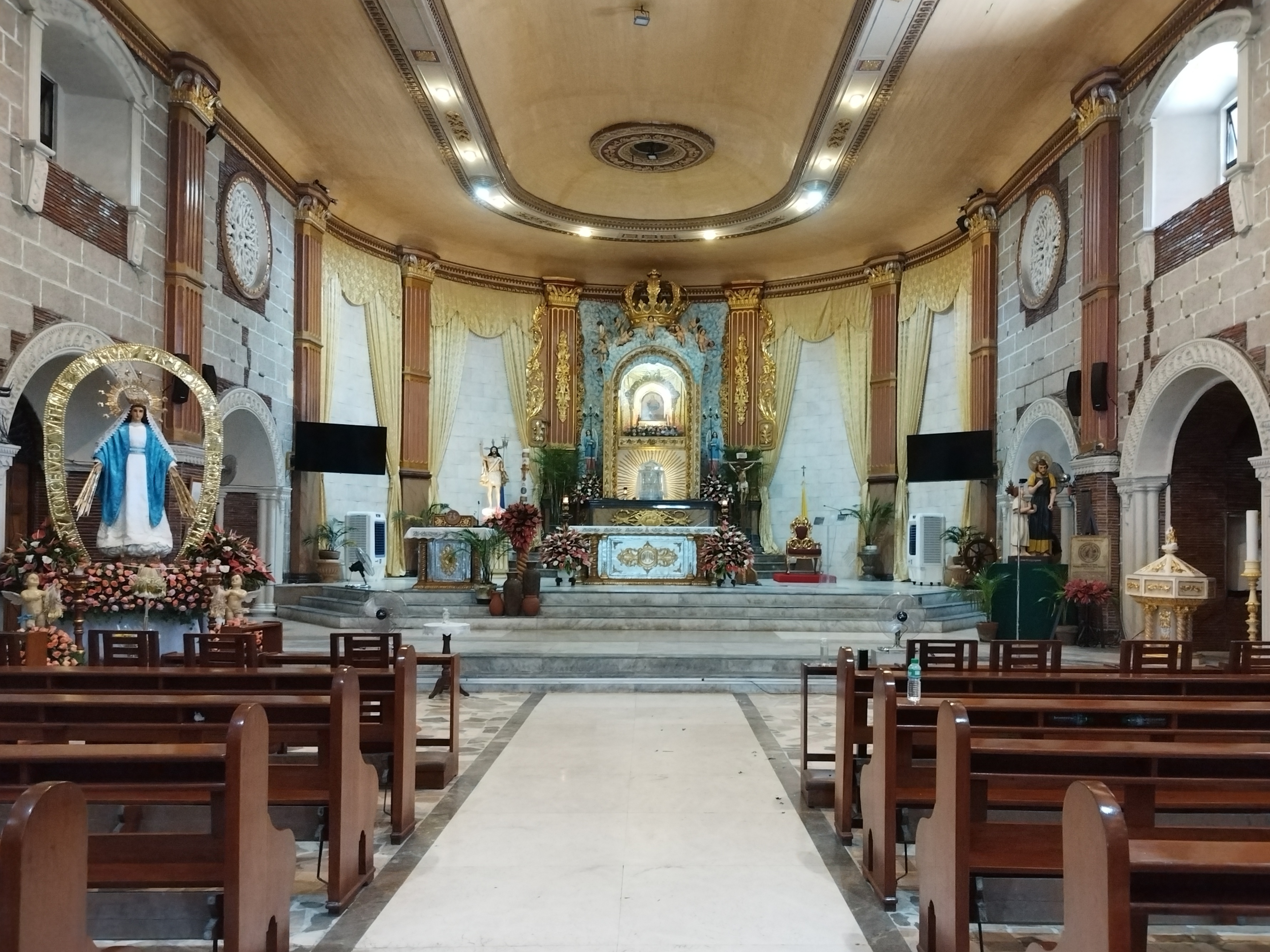
Interior of the church with the altar

In the Spanish colonial period, water transport was among the best means and cargo from the south were brought to Manila by big boats, including the many batel (fishing boats) in Manila Bay. On an unknown date, a strong typhoon struck Manila and its surrounding provinces, causing great destruction and death especially along the coastal areas. Countless boats with fishermen as well as merchants were caught in the tempest at sea, including one from Mindoro loaded with merchandise. The furious wind and rain, along with waves, threatened to capsize the already flooded boat, so the terrified crew lashed themselves to the craft to avoid being thrown overboard. Their captain entered the cabin to check whatever goods he could save, and noticed the framed image of Our Lady of the Most Holy Rosary hanging on a post. A strong wind rocking the boat made the frame swing and nearly fly into the water, but the mere sight of the icon gave him some hope for safety. He begged the Virgin to spare all their lives, making a vow to build a chapel in her honour once they landed safely on shore.

The stormy night was followed by a calm, sunny morning. They found themselves on the shore of Mojón (now Muzón), a sitio of Salinas-Marcella. With great joy and gratitude, they fulfilled the captain’s promise and built a chapel on land said to belong to a certain Lieutenant Félix Suasa. The makeshift chapel was made of bamboo and the lumber from the salvaged boat was used to make the altar for the Virgin. There was great feasting, and the crew entrusted the icon to the people of Mojón, with the celebrations becoming the town fiesta. After some time, the people felt the Virgin should have a larger and more beautiful home, so the present shrine was built and the icon translated there.

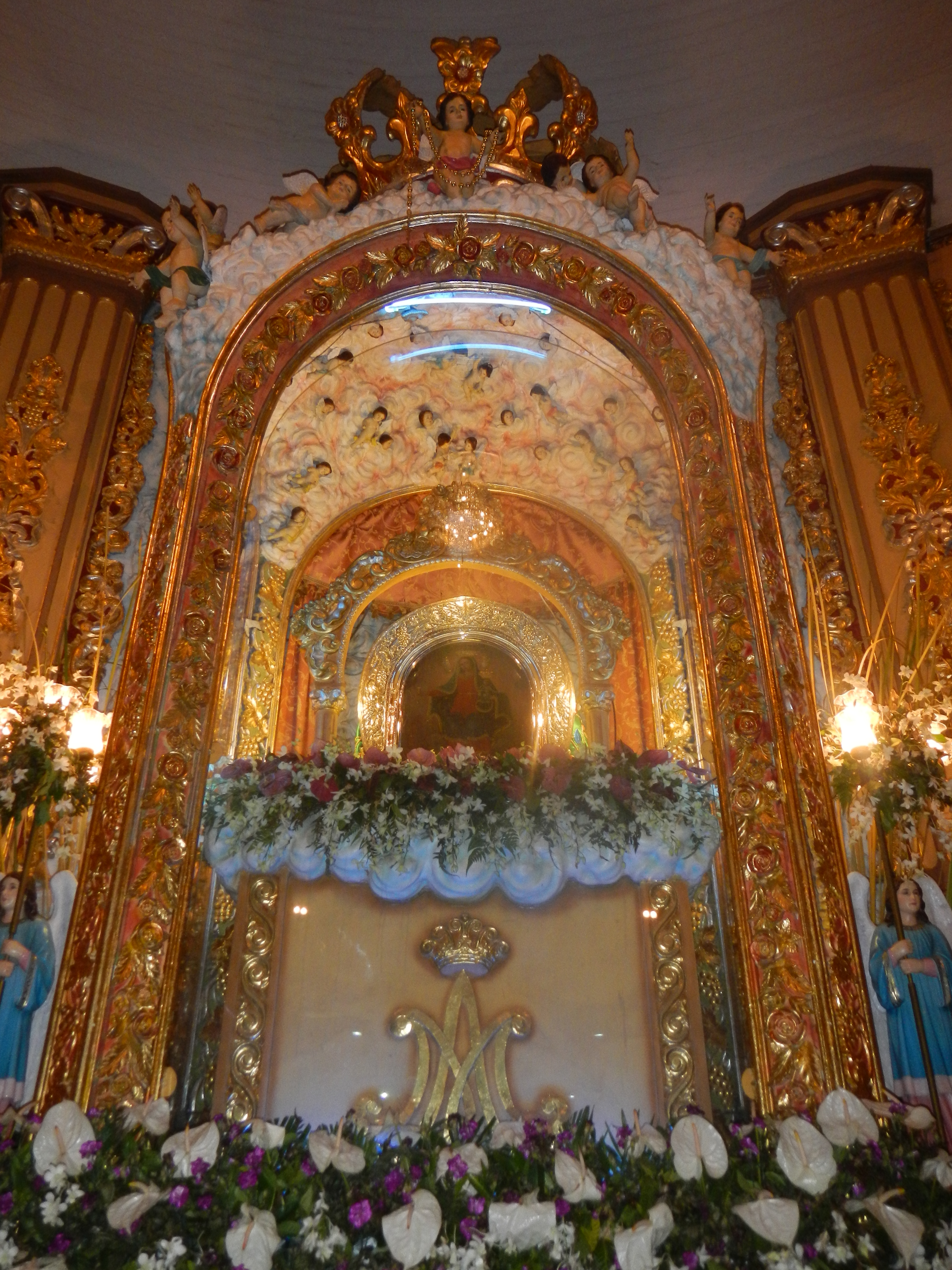
The altarpiece where the image is enshrined.

There are no extant records as to when the icon arrived and became patroness of Rosario. On April 21, 1984, Tony Nazareno, president of the Antique Dealers Association of the Philippines, came to examine the painting. According to him, the image is a product of a Filipino artist, with the Virgin’s face being more Filipina – a rarity in local religious iconography. He theorised based on the icon’s style that it was by the painter, Faustino Quiotang, and Nazareno suggested it was produced sometime between 1810 and 1820.

The parish and town of Rosario itself was established on October 22, 1845 as promulgated by Governor-General Narciso Clavería.

Pope Francis granted the request for a pontifical coronation on March 3, 2025. The Mass and coronation rites were held on October 9, 2025 at the shrine, led by Apostolic Nuncio to the Philippines Archbishop Charles John Brown representing Popes Francis (who died on April 21, 2025) and his successor, Leo XIV. Also present was Cardinal Jose Advincula, Metropolitan Archbishop of Manila.

== Devotion ==
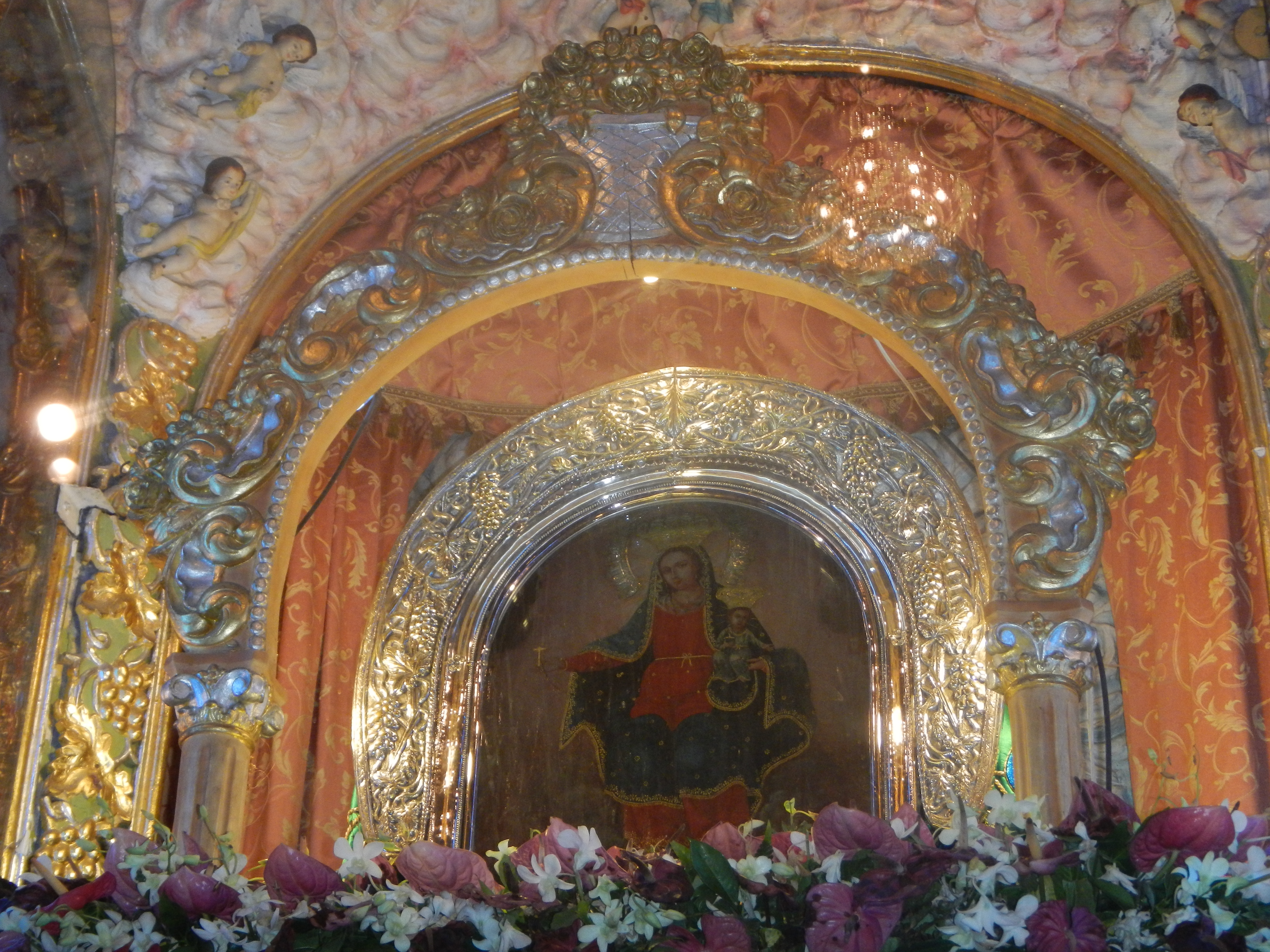
The icon of Our Lady of the Most Holy Rosary at the altarpiece.

The town fiesta of Rosario or the feast of Our Lady of the Most Holy Rosary is celebrated twice a year, the first is in the month of May held during the third Sunday of the month. In some instances, it is moved to the fourth Sunday when it is close in proximity to the fiesta of Saint Isidore the Laborer. The second is on October 7 to celebrate the feast of Our Lady of the Most Holy Rosary.

The festivities include the ritual dance-procession called "caracol" (also spelled "karakol", meaning "prayer through dancing" or "pasayaw na pananalangin"), also danced in other festivals within the province of Cavite and thus serves as the local equivalent of Manila's Buling-Buling of the district of Pandacan. During the eve of the fiesta, the Virgin is placed on a float or andas during the dance-procession, which is then carried on the shoulders by her devotees (mostly male). The two-tiered float is heavily decorated with curtains and flowers. From the church, majority of those who participate in the Caracol procession also dances to the lively tune of "Pandanggo" or any Philippine folk music provided by the town's brass marching bands, hired to provide musical accompaniment to the procession or via sound trucks blasting recorded music. The float of the Virgin Mary is also swayed to the music while it is being paraded around town. Together with the dancing, the procession is a slow snail-like pace (the origin of the word "caracol", the Spanish word for snail). The image of the Virgin Mary is brought towards the shore of Manila Bay for a fluvial procession.

Once the dance-procession reaches the seashore, the image of the Virgin is then boarded on a big fishing boat. While at the sea, hundreds of smaller fishing boats go around the Marian boat as veneration to the Virgin. Music is provided by the brass band also loaded on their boats. Adding color to the fluvial parade, participating boats displays different colorful banners during the fluvial parade. From Barangay Wawa, the image is brought to Barangay Muzon where it lands. From Muzon, the Virgin is once again brought back to the church with the "Karakol sa lupa" or "land Caracol".

This Caracol caught the attention of the committee on the Marian procession in Intramuros. In December 1982, the Virgin and the people of Rosario were invited to participate in the annual Grand Marian Procession in Intramuros. People applauded as the Virgin and her devotees danced to the joyful tune of the "Pandanggo". Even the Apostolic Nuncio to the Philippines that time, Bruno Torpigiliani, was deeply touched by the scene. Hence, he commented that this was the first time he witnessed such a deep and strong filial devotion to the Blessed Mother.

== Organizations ==
The Cofradia de la Nuestra Senora del Santisimo Rosario, Reina del Caracol (Confraternity of Our Lady of the Most Holy Rosary, Queen of Caracol or the Kapisanan ng Mahal na Birhen ng Santo Rosario) is a church organization dedicated to the patroness.
