= Anna Fegi =

Filipino singer and actress

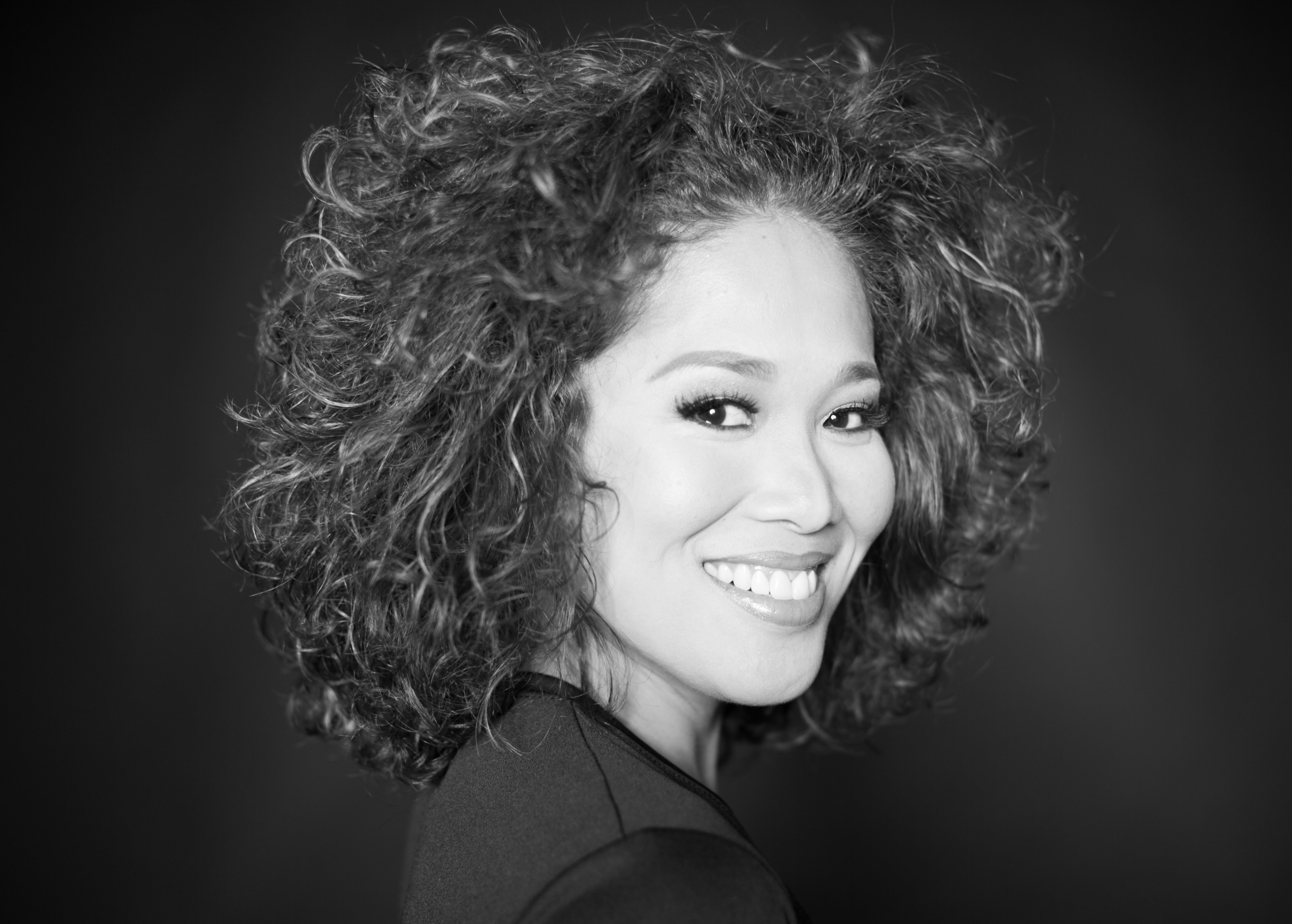

Background information
- Born: Anna Marie Encienzo Fegi; April 18, 1977 (age 49); Toledo, Cebu, Philippines
- Genres: Pop, OPM, musical theatre
- Occupations: Singer, actress
- Years active: 1993–present

Anna Fegi (born April 18, 1977) is a Filipino singer and actress. She has performed internationally in over seventy countries and is known for her work on the popular show ASAP on the ABS-CBN television network and The Filipino Channel (TFC), her performances in the Himig Handog competitions, as well as her two solo albums released under the Sony BMG label. Fegi is recognized by her powerful voice, high vocal range, and trademark curly hair.

== Early life ==
Anna Fegi was born in Toledo, Cebu, Philippines and is the fourth of seven children born to Gaudencio and Soccoro Fegi. The family is a very musical family and they spent time together singing and performing while living in Barangay Lutopan. Her mother was a religion teacher at De La Salle Andres Soriano Memorial School (ASMS) and her father was the school audio/visual technician. The family lived together in a small house in the teachers' compound on the school campus. Her father built his own sound systems from scratch and it was on those systems that he played records and cassette tapes while Anna learned to sing along. Barbra Streisand and Whitney Houston were two of the early influences of Fegi as she learned to sing along to their records. At the encouragement of her parents, Anna entered local singing contests and performed for school and church events.

== Career ==
=== Discovery ===
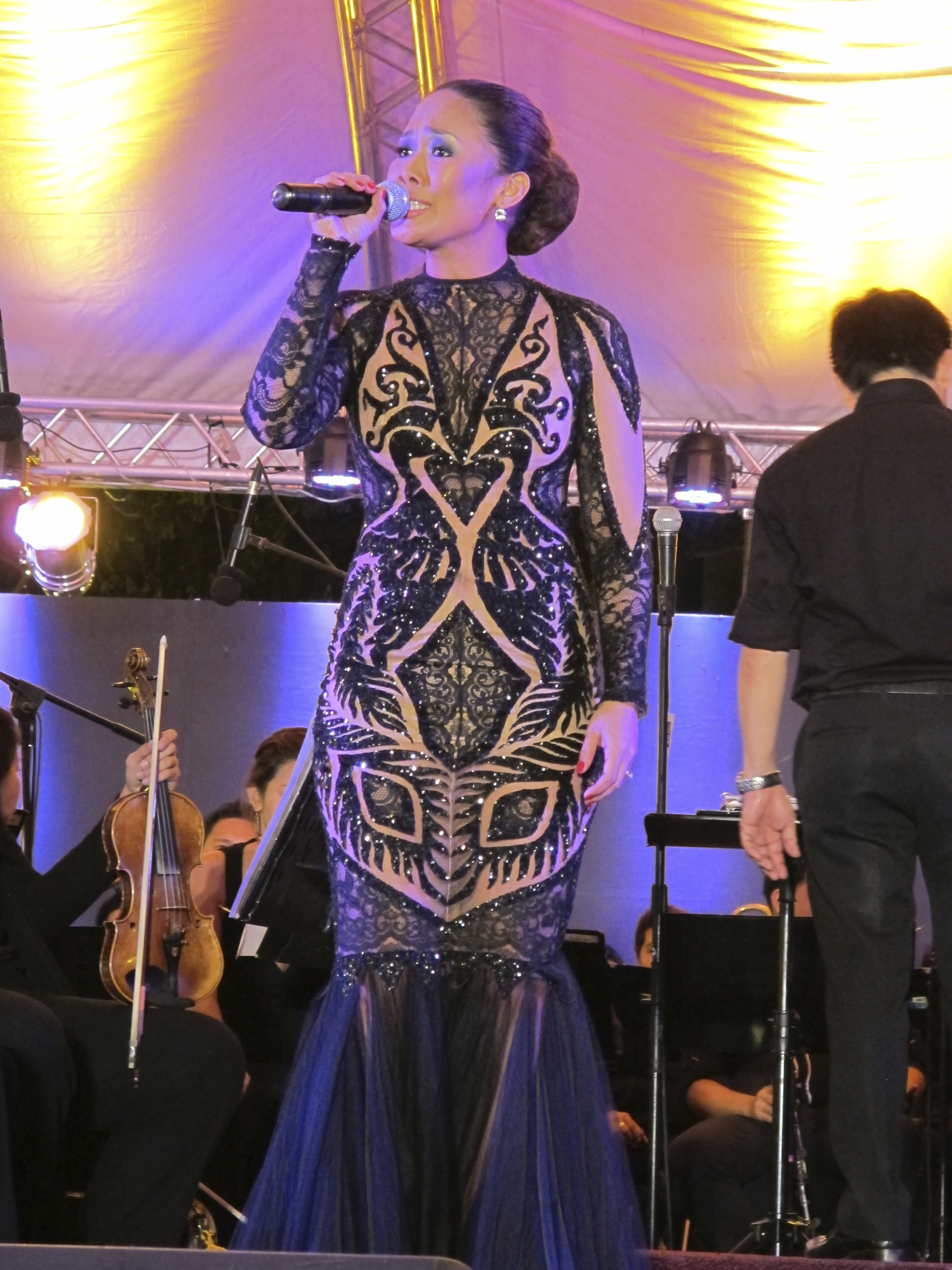
Anna Fegi performing with the Manila Philharmonic Orchestra in 2013

Fegi was first discovered by Ryan Cayabyab and producer Judd Berlin during a talent search in Cebu when they were looking for a new member of the award-winning group, Smokey Mountain. She was just fifteen years old when she moved to Manila to begin rehearsals for the group. She performed two years later as a part of the group's third batch, along with Chedi Vergara and Jason Angangan, while touring in Japan in 1994.

=== Early career ===
After performing in Smokey Mountain, she turned to the world of musical theater and joined the Japan tour of the musical Hair with Tetsuya Bessho. This tour lasted for three months and afterwards she returned to Cebu to resume her studies at University of San Jose–Recoletos where she was a Mass Communication student and an Amparito Llamas Lhuiller Educational Foundation (ALLEF) scholar, foundation of Cebuana philanthropist Amparito Lhuillier. She continued performing for school events and was able to tour the United States for the first time as a part of the school's Dramatics and Cultural Ensemble, directed by Dr. Milagros Espina. Fegi was inducted into the inaugural class of the USJ-R Dramatics and Cultural Ensemble's Hall of Fame in 2018.

In 1997, Ryan Cayabyab wrote the song "Rainbow in My Cloud" as the theme song for the animated movie Vulcan (in the Philippines known as Anak ng Bulkan) and asked Fegi to record it. The recording won an Awit Award in 1998 for Best Theme Song for Movie/TV/Stage.

=== Move to Manila (1998–2006) ===
In 1998, Fegi decided to leave school and move to Manila to become closer to the music scene. One of the first people she was introduced to was her future manager, Bibsy Carballo. Carballo became Fegi's manager for five years.

Television network ABS-CBN produces a televised song writing competition each year called Himig Handog. Fegi entered the competition in 2000 performing the song "Larawan," composed by Dodjie Simon, which won the People's Choice Award. Upon her success from "Himig Handog," she signed a record deal later that year with the Sony BMG. This led to her release of two successful solo albums. Fegi's debut album titled Every Step of the Way was recorded in 2000 and released in 2001. It featured the original recording of the popular song "I Need You," although LeAnn Rimes, another Sony BMG artist, released it sooner. In 2000 Fegi joined the popular ABS-CBN television program ASAP. She went on to perform as a regular member of the show for five years. The show is broadcast worldwide as a part of The Filipino Channel. Her segment, titled Versus, with fellow singer Bituin Escalante became a popular feature on the show. In 2000, she became a front support act for the Irish pop vocal band Westlife for their "East Meets West" concert tour in Manila.

It was also in 2000 that Fegi joined Atlantis Productions for her first musical theater role in Manila. She appeared in the role of "Pilate" in the Atlantis Productions staging of the musical Jesus Christ Superstar in Manila. This led to an ongoing working relationship with well-known Manila theater directors Bobby Garcia and Chari Arespacochaga. Fegi continued her work with Atlantis Productions in 2001, performing in role of "Maureen" in the musical Rent at the Victoria Theatre and Concert Hall in Singapore. The next year, in 2002, she performed the role of "Magenta" in the musical Rocky Horror Show at the RCBC Theater in Manila, and again in 2003 in the role of "Deena Jones" in the musical Dreamgirls, also in Manila.

Fegi performed in 2000 and 2001 in the GMA Network's televised song writing competition called "Metropop Song Festival." In 2000, she performed the song "Tell Me Why," a duet with Robby Navarro. In 2001, she performed the song "Destiny" on the show. Although she did not win, her performance was later released on compilation albums. In 2002, Fegi appeared in a national television commercial for Coca-Cola. She also appeared as a guest on television shows and specials on the ABS-CBN, GMA, TV5, and Studio 23 networks. She is often hired for corporate events for large companies such as Coca-Cola, Bayer Philippines, Levi's, San Miguel, Bank of the Philippine Islands (BPI), Toyota, and PLDT. In 2003, Fegi was nominated for an Awit Award for Best Performance by a Female Recording Artist for the song "Closer You and I."

She released her second solo album, Straight Ahead, in 2003. This album contained the popular song "Saan Ka Na Kaya Ngayon" This would be her final release under her recording contract with Sony BMG and was noted as having more Tagalog language songs under the Original Pilipino Music (OPM) genre. The album earned two Awit Award nominations in 2004: "Saan Ka Na Kaya Ngayon" for Best Performance by a Female Recording Artist as well as "Even If" (with Luke Mejares) for Best Performance by a Duet.

In addition to her solo albums, Fegi recorded for a few compilation albums. In 2003 she recorded the song "That's What Love Is For," which appeared on the album titled Mga Misteryo Ng Liwanag which was released under the Universal Records label. In 2004, Fegi recorded the song "I Hear my Name," which appeared on the album Kapayapaan Songs of Faith and Hope, which was released by the Jesuits Communications Foundation. Fegi also appeared on two movie soundtracks in 2004, including the song "Minsan Pa," the title theme sound for the movie of the same name. She appeared in a scene in the movie as a piano bar singer. Fegi's song "Wala Ka Na" was used on the soundtrack for the movie Masikip sa Dibdib, which was produced by Viva Films. Fegi also appeared as a singer in the movie, along with many popular singers such as Regine Velasquez, Martin Nievera, Ogie Alcasid, Lani Misalucha, Sarah Geronimo, and many more.

In the next few years, Fegi continued performing in the Philippines as well as tours to Dubai, Abu Dhabi, Singapore, Guam, and back again to the United States. Her U.S. tour included stops in Los Angeles, San Francisco, and San Diego in California and the Golden Nugget in Las Vegas, Nevada. In 2003, Fegi won the Grand Prize of that year's Himig Handog competition on the ABS-CBN network. That year she performed the song "Kailan Kita Mamahalin" by composer Arnel de Pano. In 2004, Fegi was a judge on the ABS-CBN television competition Star in a Million. The following year in 2005, she producer her own award-winning tour in venues throughout Metro Manila. For her work, Fegi was awarded both the Awit and the Aliw Awards for "Best Female Singer in Bars and Lounges."

=== Move to Hong Kong (2006–2007) ===
Although Fegi experienced both critical and commercial success in Manila, she continued searching for more growth in her performing career. She decided to pursue an opportunity to return to the stage in performing the role of Nala in the Festival of the Lion King at Hong Kong Disneyland in Hong Kong. Fegi went on to complete three contracts with the company during 2006 and 2007. In September 2007, she decided not to sign another contract with Disney to finish her college degree. She earned a Bachelor of Arts degree in Mass Communication from University of San Jose–Recoletos in April 2008, while receiving awards for "Outstanding ETEEAP Graduate" and "Outstanding Project Study."

=== Cruise ships (2008–2012, 2014–2015) ===
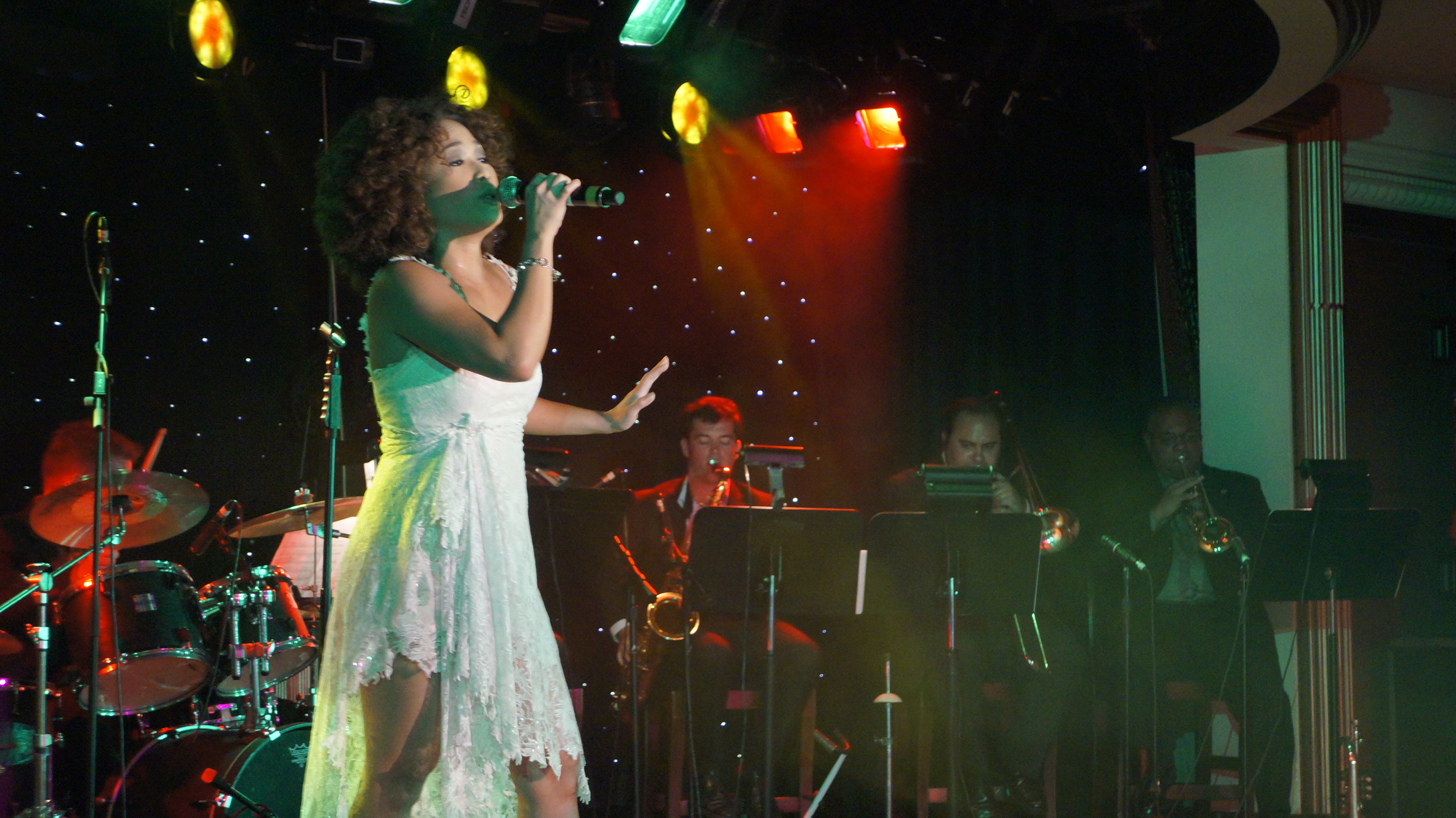
Anna Fegi performing on board the Azamara Quest in 2012

Also in the spring of 2008, Fegi received an offer from Royal Caribbean International to travel as a featured singer with their cruise line. Her first contract was on board the Radiance of the Seas where she toured Alaska, California, and South America. She renewed her contract and performed on board the Brilliance of the Seas in Europe and the Middle East. Her next contract was on board the Mariner of the Seas, which took her back to Europe for 6 months. Her last contract was to be a part of the take-out cast of the luxury ship Azamara Quest. During this contract she traveled throughout the countries of Asia, the Middle East, and Europe.

During her time on board cruise ships, Fegi experienced two life-threatening incidents. In December 2010 while she was on board the Brilliance of the Seas, the ship was caught in a storm off the coast of Egypt and experienced severe damage after experiencing strong wind and waves. Then again in March 2012, the Azamara Quest experienced a fire in the engine room. The fire was put out, but the ship suffered extensive damages while sailing between the Philippines and Malaysia. Many guests praised the efforts of the crew and the entertainment department, of which Fegi was a member, for keeping spirits high immediately following the near death experience.

For her work on board cruise ships, Fegi was awarded a special citation for "Filipino Recording Artists Championing the World of Cruise Entertainment" at the 2011 Awit Awards ceremony.

In 2014, Fegi and her husband returned to work with Azamara cruises. In 2014 they worked on board the Azamara Journey, which visited over forty countries in Asia and Europe. Fegi was specifically chosen for the project as it was a major overhaul of their onboard entertainment. Fegi performed her own featured headliner show during her five months on board. Her husband Adam was the drummer and musical director on board the ship. In late 2014 they returned to the Azamara Quest, which visited over forty countries in Asia, Africa, and Europe from November 2014 until July 2015. In their return to ships both Fegi and her husband began writing a travel and entertainment column for Cebu Daily News, a daily newspaper published in Cebu by the Inquirer group.

While working on board, Anna appeared in a TV documentary titled Nigel Marven's Cruise Ship Adventures with British wildlife television host Nigel Marven. In the episode, Fegi, along with a few of her cast members followed Marven from Kochi, India and through the country side of the Kerala region. The episode originally aired on W Channel in the United Kingdom and other channels throughout Europe.

=== Work in Manila and Cebu (2012–present) ===
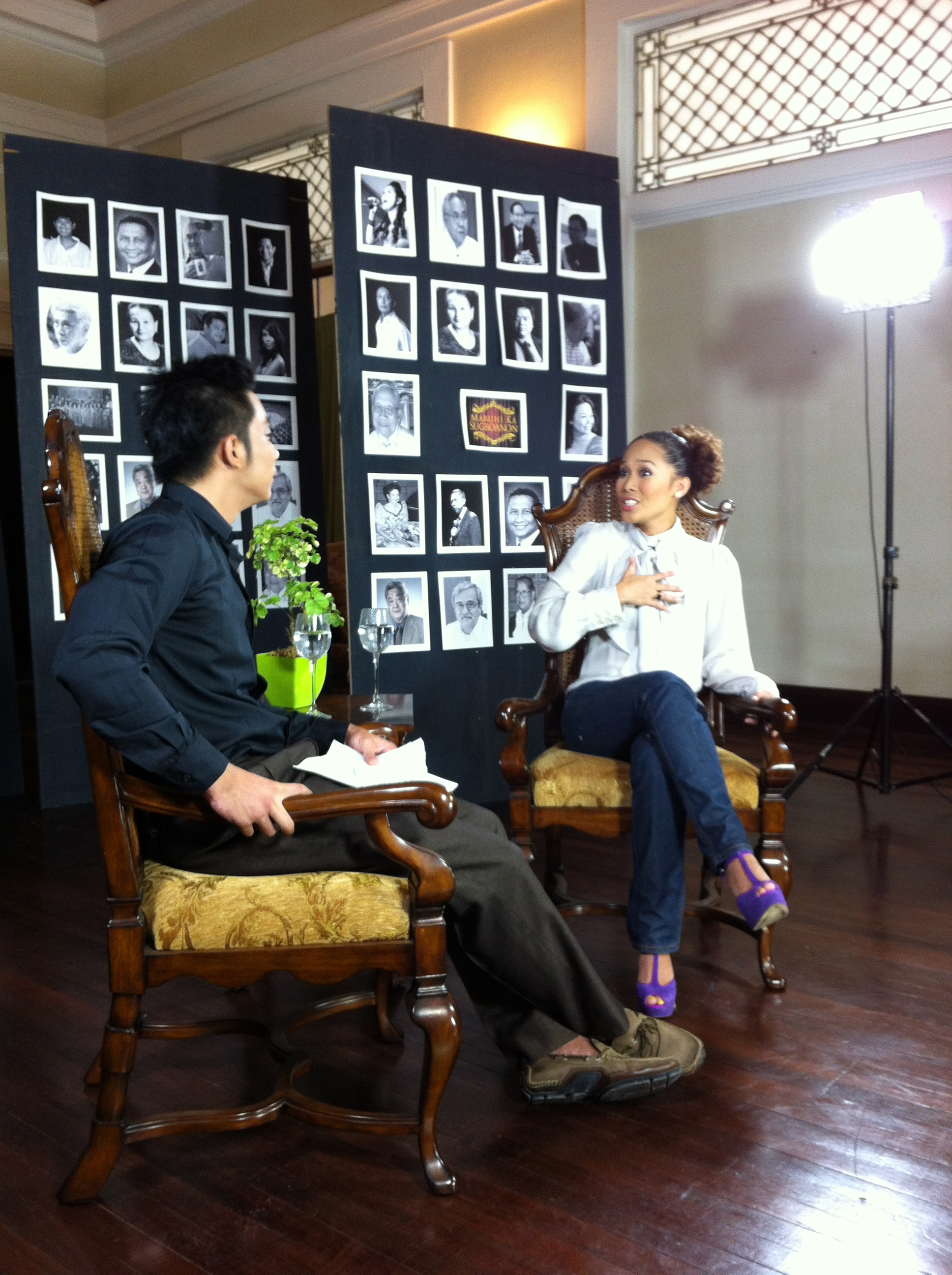
Anna Fegi during a television interview in 2012

In 2012, Fegi appeared in the role of "Christmas Eve" in the musical Avenue Q at the Grand Theater at Marina Bay Sands in Singapore in September and October 2012. This show was produced by Atlantis Productions. In November, Fegi went back into the studio to record several new, original songs she co-wrote entitled, "Don't Say You Love Me," "I Thought I Knew Him So Well," and "(I Love You)More than Anything." In 2013, Fegi was chosen by the ABS-CBN television network to appear in a series of nationwide commercials promoting tourism in Cebu. In 2013, Fegi performed with the Manila Philharmonic Orchestra, appeared on the 18th Anniversary episode of ASAP, the latest version of ABS-CBN's Himig Handog televised competition held at the Mall of Asia Arena, P-Pop Himig Handog Love Songs, Gary Valenciano's 30th Anniversary episode of ASAP, as well as several episodes of Wowowillie on the TV5 network.

In July 2013, Fegi began rehearsals with Gantimpala Theater Foundation for an original musical titled "Katipunan, Mga Anak ng Bayan" based on the story of Philippine hero, Andres Bonifacio. The production is directed by famed director Joel Lamangan. The show toured for August and September and also had a Manila run. For her performance, Fegi was nominated for Best Actress in a Musical in the 2014 Aliw Awards.

Following the devastation of both the 7.2 magnitude earthquake in Bohol and Cebu in October 2013 and also the super typhoon Haiyan (locally named Yolanda) in November, Fegi participated in numerous fundraising and benefit shows to help raise money for those affected by the natural disasters. Both events hit close to home for Fegi as she is from Cebu and her parents, a sister, and extended family live in the town of Palompon, Leyte which was directly hit by the super typhoon.

In 2014, Fegi's version of the song "That's What Love Is For" was re-released on Universal Records's praise and worship album Mga Misteryo Ng Lwanag.

Fegi performed at both public shows as well as large corporate and international events such as the Asia-Pacific Economic Cooperation (APEC) Conference, the Asian Carriers Conference, the 2015 Gawad CCP Awards along with the Philippine Philharmonic Orchestra at the Cultural Center of the Philippines, the 2016 International Eucharistic Congress as well as the 2016 Sinulog Festival in Cebu. In 2015 and 2016, Fegi participated in a series of fundraising shows for the Basilica Minore de Santo Niño in Cebu, performing along with artists such as Sheryn Regis, Donna Cruz, and others. In June 2016, Fegi was invited and performed for the President-Elect of the Philippines, Rodrigo Duterte. In July, Fegi returned to the ASAP stage as part of the tribute to legendary OPM composer Willy Cruz.

In 2016, Fegi became a brand ambassador for both M. Lhuillier Financial Services and Cordlife Philippines. Fegi has appeared in marketing materials and billboards representing those brands.

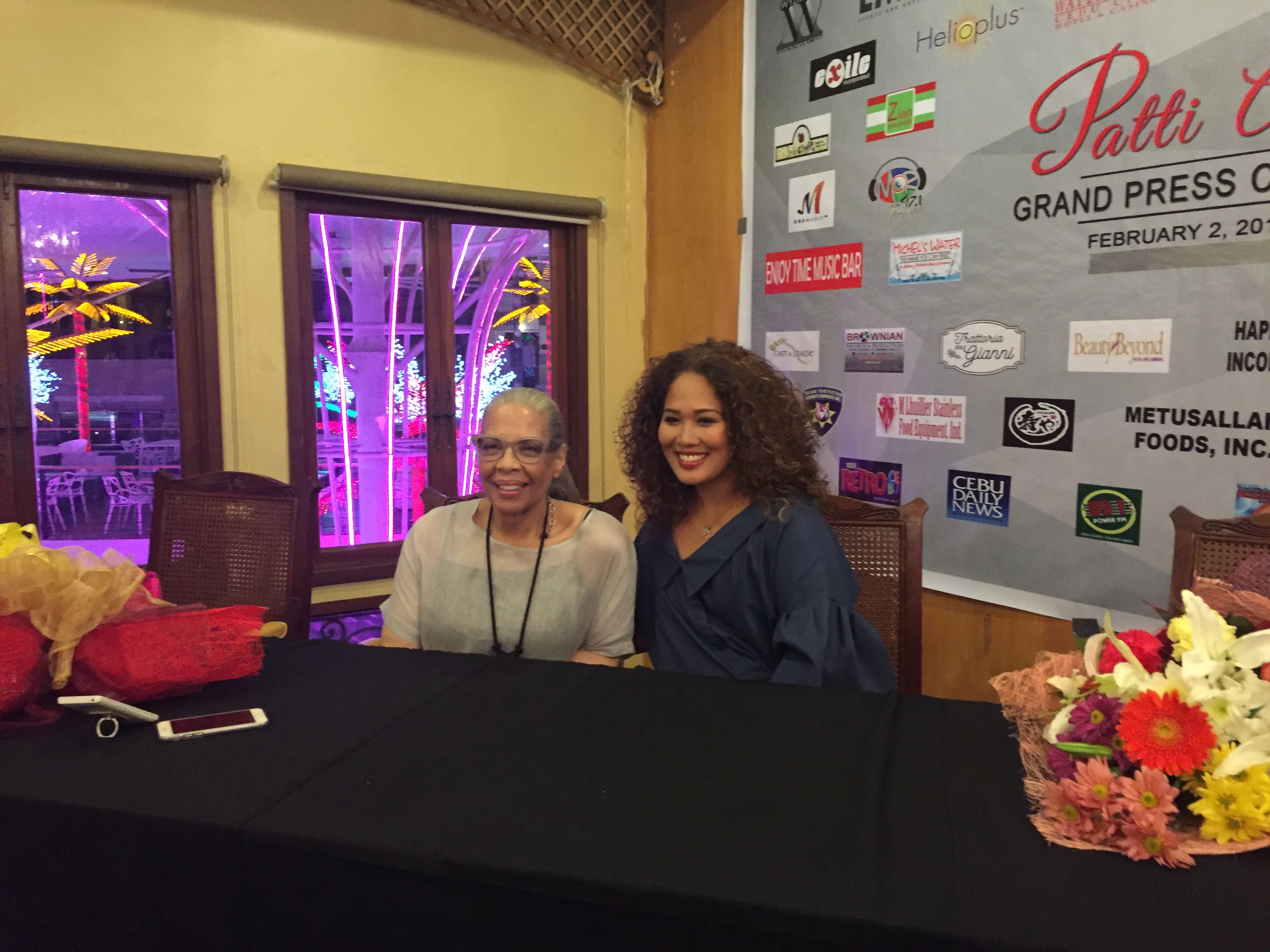
Patti Austin and Anna Fegi at a press conference in 2017

In 2017, Fegi performed with GRAMMY Award-winning singer and songwriter Patti Austin. Fegi then returned to the ASAP stage for the 22nd anniversary special. The segment was titled ASAP Divas vs. ASAP Birit Queens, with previous singers performing alongside the current performers of the show. Performers included Bituin Escalante, Frenchie Dy, Vina Morales, Jona Viray, Morissette, Klarisse de Guzman, and Angeline Quinto. Fegi continues to for corporate events, including for PLDT with Ryan Cayabyab and the Manila Symphony Orchestra and well as in Makati with Cayabyab and the ABS-CBN Philharmonic Orchestra. The show was broadcast on the TV5 network. She performed as the special guest of Gary Valenciano for his Valentine's Show titled Love in Motion on February 14 and 15 at Shangri-La at the Fort in Manila. Fegi also performed along with international artist David Pomeranz at the Waterfront Hotel and Casino in Cebu . Fegi performed at the opening of the new Phil Am Life tower in Cebu and for other companies such as Bayer.

Throughout 2017, Fegi performed in events for the ASEAN Summit both in Cebu and Manila. In Cebu, she performed for both the Finance Ministers and the Defense Ministers in separate events. On April 29, Fegi performed at the Gala Dinner for the closing of the ASEAN Summit at the Sofitel Plaza Hotel in Pasay, Metro Manila. The event was hosted by the President of the Republic of the Philippines, Rodrigo Duterte and was attended by the heads of state of all member nations. In July, Fegi performed at the Senior Economic Officials Meeting at Radisson Blu Cebu and in August at the opening of the 50th ASEAN Foreign Ministers' Meeting held at the Sofitel Plaza Hotel.

At the end of 2017, Fegi performed at the annual tree lighting at Radisson Blu Cebu along with the UV Chorale, the Cebu Philharmonic Orchestra, and tenor Arman Ferrer. She was a guest performer at the Cebu show of legendary singer Jose Mari Chan as he celebrated his 50 years in the music industry. Fegi also performed for the 35th anniversary celebration of Sun.Star Newspaper along with Matteo Guidicelli and Kurt Fick and as part of the show Divas Live in Cebu with Kyla, KZ Tandingan, Angeline Quinto, Jaya (filling in for Yeng Constantino), and Erik Santos. The Divas Live in Cebu event was a part of World AIDS Day.

In 2018, Fegi continued performing for corporate events in Cebu, Manila, and other provinces. She appeared on three episodes of ASAP, including a special TLC segment that featured her along with her husband, Adam Brown. Fegi also performed as part of the Thanksgiving Night and Awarding Ceremony for the 2018 Pista ng Pelikulang Pilipino film festival held in Makati City, Manila. She also performed as part of the first ever Pinoy Playlist Music Festival in Manila, which was organized by Maestro Ryan Cayabyab, Moy Ortiz, Noel Ferrer, and the BGC Arts Center. 2018 also marked Fegi's return to performing onboard international cruise ships as a guest entertainer. She performs for a week at a time, flying between different ships to perform her headliner show. In her first year back, she performed on multiple ships throughout Asia, working for several different cruise lines. Fegi also performed for a series of events at Pagcor venues in Metro Cebu in November and December 2018.

Fegi was a performer in the Opening Ceremony of the 2019 Southeast Asian Games, held at the Philippine Arena on November 30, 2019. Other artists who performed include Lani Misalucha, Christian Bautista, Aicelle Santos, Jed Madela, Elmo Magalona, KZ Tandingan, Iñigo Pascual, TNT Boys, Robert Sena, and apl.de.ap of The Black Eyed Peas. The elaborate event was a joint production of Video Sonic, Stage Craft, and US-based Emmy Award winning live content producer FiveCurrents.

On November 25, 2019, the Aliw Award Foundation announced that Fegi was a finalist for two awards in 2019. She was a finalist for Best Pop Artist (Male or Female) and Best Performance in a Concert by a Female for her show at the Pinoy Playlist Music Festival in 2019 at the BGC Arts Center.

In May 2020, Fegi and the other members of Smokey Mountain reunited virtually for a Bayanihan Musikahan special. They performed a "Paraiso/Better World" medley as well as "Da Coconut Nut." The performance was shown on ABS-CBN as well as streamed as a fundraising effort for the coronavirus pandemic. The group held another virtual reunion on June 30 for the benefit of World Wildlife Fund.

From February to June 2021, Fegi was a regular judge for the Bida Voice: Shy Singing Competition segment on the show Eat Bulaga! on the GMA Network. The segment took place three times each week. Other regular judges of the singing competition included Ice Seguerra, Allan K., and Inka Magnaye. The Grand Finals was held on June 19, 2021, and also included guest judges Arnel Pineda, Lani Misalucha, Carl Guevara, and Nonoy Zuñiga.

On April 27, 2021, Fegi, along with Janine Berdin and Miss Universe 2018 Catriona Gray, was a featured performer for the Gala Night to celebrate the 500th Anniversary of the Battle of Mactan at the Liberty Shrine, Mactan, Lapu-Lapu City.

== Brown Academy of Music ==
In 2015 after completing two more worldwide cruise contracts, Fegi and her husband returned to Cebu. They own Brown Academy of Music (BAM), a performing arts school in Cebu City. They have both spent decades performing music around the world and Fegi's husband also holds degrees in Music Education and Education. Fegi and her husband own and operate the school, creating a premier source of music education in the city. The school opened in January 2016 in Cebu. The first performance of Brown Academy of Music took place on April 9, 2016, at Ayala Terraces at Ayala Center Cebu. The show featured Fegi as well as a guest performance by the writer of the hit Bisaya song HAHAHAHasula, Jude Gitamondoc, and Jacky Chang. Actors Derek Ramsay, Nico Antonio, and Shaina Magdayao were also there to promote their movie My Candidate. Several months after opening, Fegi created a group called the Elite BAMStars that she directs and produces. The group has performed throughout the city as featured acts as well as opening up for such artists as Bea Alonzo, Gerald Anderson, Bailey May, Matteo Guidicelli, Donna Cruz, Marissa Sanchez, and international artist David Pomeranz. Due to the success of Brown Academy of Music, they quickly expanded their facilities to meet growing enrollment demands with an additional sixty square meters, bringing their total to 150 square meters, including rehearsal spaces, teaching rooms, and a studio. In June 2017, the school had Sheryn Regis, the Crystal Voice of Asia as a guest artist for their culminating show at Ayala Terraces. That same year, BAM hosted Maestro Ryan Cayabyab for a contemporary a cappella workshop held in Cebu City. The Elite BAMStars have performed in shows with Jose Mari Chan, Kyla, KZ Tandingan, Angeline Quinto, Jaya, Erik Santos, and IV of Spades.

Her husband is the author of the book Fundamentals of Reading Music which is a textbook and workbook used as a part of the curriculum at Brown Academy of Music and is available worldwide through Amazon.

== Personal life ==
Anna Fegi married Adam Brown (from Cincinnati, Ohio) on August 21, 2012, at Sacred Heart Church in Cebu, Philippines. A reception followed at the Radisson Blu hotel. Fegi and Brown met while performing onboard cruise ships where she was a featured singer and he was a drummer and musical director. In September 2012, Fegi's wedding gown, designed by Philip Rodriguez, was featured as a part of Face-Off's "Filipino Bridal Heritage Exhibit" held in Manila at both the Dusit Thani Hotel and the Power Plant Mall at Rockwell Center. In 2016, Fegi was pregnant with her first child, but was stillborn in November at the beginning of the 9th month of pregnancy. The daughter, named Aria Mikeila, serves as an inspiration to them both and the children's classes at Brown Academy of Music have been renamed in her memory. Their love story was featured during a TLC segment on ASAP in August 2018. On February 15, 2020, Fegi announced that she is pregnant and expecting a baby girl in June 2020. She gave birth to a baby girl, Amaria Michelle, on May 27, 2020, in Cebu City.

== Discography ==
=== Solo albums ===
- Every Step of the Way (2001, Sony BMG)
- Straight Ahead (2003, Sony BMG)

=== Compilation albums ===
- Himig Handog Sa Bayaning Pilipino (2000, Star Music)
- 2001 Metropop Song Festival (2001, BMG Records Pilipinas)
- Close-Up Compilation (2003, BMG Records Pilipinas)
- Mga Misteryo Ng Liwanag (2003, Universal Records)
- Himig Handog Love Songs 2 (2003, Star Music)
- Kapayapaan Songs of Faith and Hope (2004, Jesuit Communications Foundation)
- OPM Love Mix (2004, Star Music)
- Pinoy Champs (2005, Star Music)
- One Hand, One Heart: Philippine Tagalog Music (2006, Sony Music Philippines)
- Lagi Kitang Mamahalin (2006, Viva Records)
- Smokey Mountain: I Feel What You Feel (2011, Sony Music Philippines)
- Mga Misteryo Ng Liwanag (re-released in 2014, Universal Records)

=== Movie soundtracks ===
- Vulcan (released in the Philippines as Anak ng Bulkan) – "Rainbow in My Cloud" (1997, Premiere Entertainment Productions)
- Minsan Pa – "Minsa Pa (Theme Song)" (2004, MLR Films)
- Masikip sa Dibdib – "Wala Ka Na" (2004, Viva Films)

=== Jingles ===
- M.O.R. Theme – "Mellow and Remix version" (2001-2008, ABS-CBN)

== Awards ==
- Best Movie/TV/Stage Theme Song Recording- Awit Award in 1998
- People's Choice Award- ABS-CBN Himig Handog in 2000
- Outstanding Cebuana- Cebu Chamber of commerce in 2002
- Most Promising Artist- Aliw Award in 2003
- Grand Prize Winner- ABS-CBN Himig Handog in 2003
- Best Female Singer in Bars and Lounges- Awit Award in 2005
- Best Female Singer in Bars, Hotels, and Lounges- Aliw Award in 2005
- Special Citation for Filipino Recording Artists Championing the World of Cruise Entertainment- Awit Award in 2011
- Hall of Fame University of San Jose–Recoletos Dramatics and Cultural Ensemble in 2018
