= Adam Brown (music educator) =

American drummer

- Born: Adam Michael Brown; August 21, 1981 (age 44)
- Origin: Cincinnati, Ohio, United States
- Instruments: Drums, percussion

Adam Brown (born August 21, 1981) is an American drummer and music educator from Cincinnati, Ohio. He started his formal music education in elementary school and continued while a student in Fairfield High School in Ohio. After graduating Summa Cum Laude in high school, he went on to earn a music scholarship at the University of North Texas and graduated with a Bachelor of Music in Music Education. Brown earned his Master of Science in Education Summa Cum Laude from Walden University. He is most known as a musical director for Royal Caribbean International, drummer and musical director for Anna Fegi-Brown, and owner and chief operating officer of Brown Academy of Music located in Cebu City. Philippines.

== Early life ==
Adam Brown was born in Cincinnati, Ohio, and is the first of two children born to Bruce and Sara Brown. Adam was more involved in sports as a child, particularly in baseball. But as he grew older he began to focus on his music study. His very first public performances included singing with his grandmother in church. Brown began performing professionally at the age of 13 with local performances around the Cincinnati area. As a student at Fairfield High School he performed with almost every musical group in band, choir, and orchestra. He was a member of the wind ensemble, marching band, percussion ensemble, jazz band, symphony orchestra, show choir band, and pit orchestra. Outside of school he played in local youth orchestras, concert bands, as well as some jazz ensembles. His younger sister, Heidi, was also involved in the band program. His parents provided him with a great education, allowing him to take private lessons and also attend the Modern Drummer Festival as well as the Drum Daze clinics presented by Columbus Percussion and Yamaha and the Drum Corps International World Finals. Through those experiences and the encouragement of his music teachers, he decided to pursue music as a career.

Brown first started his teaching career at the age of 14 while still a student in high school. He was asked to also teach younger students in the school district and it was at that time that he decided that music education would be his career path. He maintained an active teaching schedule as a student and performed in many groups throughout the region. As a performer Brown earned positions in the Ohio All-State Jazz Band, Regional Honor Orchestra, Honor Band, Honor Orchestra, and Honor Jazz Band. It was during his time that he started performing professionally for local events. Brown performed in multiple professional symphony orchestras and musical theater groups throughout Cincinnati while still in high school.

== College ==
In 1999, Brown enrolled in the University of North Texas as a music scholar receiving a music scholarship as well as an academic scholarship. As a student at UNT, Brown was a member of the percussion ensemble, drumline, marching band, steel drum band, concert band and many other ensembles. In 2000, Brown was a member of the award-winning UNT Drumline, which was the 2000 Collegiate Drumline Champion at the Percussive Arts Society International Convention in Dallas, Texas. Brown was able to study with many of the leaders in the music field, such as Mark Ford, Christopher Deane, Paul Rennick, Harrell Bosarge, Ed Smith, Brad Genevro, and Eugene Migliaro Corporon.

The world-class training that Brown received at the University of North Texas paved the way for his musical career. In 2002, Brown received an elite music scholarship from the Avedis Zildjian Company. Brown was one of only 25 students worldwide to receive this scholarship. He was also one of very few students throughout the state of Texas to receive a scholarship to the 2002 PASIC convention held in Nashville, Tennessee. While a student at UNT, Brown taught percussion lessons, classes, and ensembles at several local high schools. He also performed throughout the Dallas-Ft. Worth area in various music ensembles.

== Teaching career ==
In 2003 Brown started his full-time professional career as a music teacher. He taught high school music classes, including percussion, band, jazz band, percussion ensemble, choir, and guitar. His groups performed on a national and international level in both Bands of America and WGI competitions. During his time of public school teaching, he wrote original curriculum in multiple teaching areas. As a teacher, his groups performed in the OMEA State Convention, WGI World Championships, Bands of America Grand Nationals, Bands of American National Concert Band Festival, and the Midwest Clinic International Band and Orchestra Conference, which is the world's largest instrumental music education conference.

== Performing career ==
In 2008, Brown decided to pursue a performing career while joining the international cruise line Royal Caribbean International as a drummer and musical director. While a musical director for the company, Brown traveled to nearly 70 different countries and territories on six continents. During his time with Royal Caribbean International Brown was a part of numerous new projects and take-out shows. It was during this time that he met his wife, international singer Anna Fegi.

In 2014 and 2015 Brown performed along with his wife as a part of their headliner show throughout 6 different continents and nearly 70 countries. Since 2015, their shows were a success on multiple cruise lines, including Royal Caribbean International, Celebrity Cruises, Princess Cruises, Norwegian Cruise Line, Regent Seven Seas Cruises, Crystal Cruises, and Azamara Cruises. In addition to their work around the world, they also perform throughout the Philippines and Cebu City.

Since 2003, Brown has been an artist/educator endorser of Innovative Percussion brand of drumsticks and mallets. He has performed a series of drum clinics in both the United States and the Philippines.

== Writer ==
Brown is also an accomplished writer, having articles regularly published in Cebu Daily News and also his own book Fundamentals of Reading Music, published under BAM Publishing. His articles for Cebu Daily News incorporate his travels with his wife Anna Fegi while performing with Royal Caribbean International and setting up their music school, Brown Academy of Music. The book Fundamentals of Reading Music is a textbook and workbook used as a part of the curriculum with Brown Academy of Music.

== Brown Academy of Music ==
In 2015, Brown and his wife Anna Fegi founded their own music school located in Cebu City, Philippines called Brown Academy of Music. The school teaches the fundamentals of music and provides a venue to local music students. Brown developed a curriculum for the school based on the fundamentals of music education. He continues with an active teaching and performing schedule while maintaining the role of chief operating officer of Brown Academy of Music. Brown Academy of Music continues to be one of the premiere sources of music education in the city of Cebu.

The school's first performance was alongside Anna Fegi in "Turn Up the Music" at the Terraces at Ayala Center Cebu on Saturday, April 9, 2016. The evening also featured appearances by Derek Ramsay, Nico Antonio, and Shaina Magdayao to promote their movie My Candidate. The show also featured a guest performance of the hit Bisaya song HAHAHAHasula with the song's writer Jude Gitamondoc and Jacky Chang, who is a member of the teaching faculty. In the first year of being open, students from Brown Academy of Music have performed on ABS-CBN as well as shows at Ayala Center Cebu, Robinsons Galleria Cebu, SM City Cebu, and SM Seaside City Cebu. They have performed along numerous celebrities including Bea Alonzo, Gerald Anderson, Bailey May, Matteo Guidicelli, Donna Cruz, Marissa Sanchez, IV of Spades, Maja Salvador, Jose Mari Chan, Kyla, KZ Tandingan, Angeline Quinto, Jaya, Erik Santos, Rocksteddy, international artist David Pomeranz, and appeared at events with Regine Velasquez, Ogie Alcasid, and the President of the Philippines Rodrigo Duterte. The school quickly expanded in its first several months due to the demands of growing enrollment. BAM expanded to become 150 square meters including teaching rooms, rehearsal areas, and a studio. In June 2017, the school had Sheryn Regis, the Crystal Voice of Asia as a guest artist for their culminating show at Ayala Terraces. In 2018, a second expansion took place at the beginning of the year, taking the total space of the school to 250 square meters. The school has become a popular audition venue for national shows such as The Voice of the Philippines, Idol Philippines, Tawag ng Tanghalan, as well as international companies such as Norwegian Cruise Line, Oceania Cruises, Regent Seven Seas Cruises, and Carnival Cruise Line.

In addition to the school, Brown continues an active schedule along with his wife Anna Fegi-Brown and as a musical director for performing artists.

== Personal life ==
Adam Brown married Anna Fegi (from Cebu City, Philippines) on August 21, 2012, at Sacred Heart Church in Cebu, Philippines. A reception followed at the Radisson Blu hotel. Brown and Fegi met while performing onboard cruise ships where she was a featured singer and he was a drummer and musical director. In September 2012, Fegi's wedding gown, designed by Philip Rodriguez, was featured as a part of Face-Off's "Filipino Bridal Heritage Exhibit" held in Manila at both the Dusit Thani Hotel and the Power Plant Mall at Rockwell Center. In 2016, Anna Fegi-Brown became pregnant with their first child, but the child was stillborn in November at the beginning of the 9th month of pregnancy. The daughter, named Aria Mikeila, serves as an inspiration to them both and the children's classes at Brown Academy of Music have been renamed in her honor. Their love story was featured during a TLC segment on ASAP in August 2018. On May 27, 2020, Anna Fegi-Brown gave birth to their daughter, Amaria Michelle.
