= Smokey Mountain (band) =

Filipino singing group

- Origin: Manila, Philippines
- Genre: Pop
- Years active: 1989–1995
- Labels: Universal Records; BMG; RCA; Ivory Music & Video
- Past members: Geneva Cruz; Jeffrey Hidalgo; Tony Lambino; James Coronel; Jayson Angangan; Chedi Vergara; Zhar Santos; Anna Fegi

Smokey Mountain was a Filipino singing group formed by musical director and composer Ryan Cayabyab and executive producer Judd Berlin.

The group was based in Manila, Philippines, and had James Coronel, Geneva Cruz, Jeffrey Hidalgo, and Tony Lambino as its original members. Jayson Angangan, Chedi Vergara, and Zhar Santos joined as a second lineup after Geneva Cruz, Jeffrey Hidalgo, and Tony Lambino left the group. James Coronel left to pursue a solo career, and Anna Fegi replaced Shar Santos during a 1994 tour in Japan.

== History ==
The group was named after the Smokey Mountain garbage dump in Manila.

In 1989, the group released its first pop album, Smokey Mountain.

Having to choose between formal schooling and a two-year, two-album contract for release in Europe and the U.S., Tony Lambino and Jeffrey Hidalgo left the group, while Geneva Cruz pursued a solo career and released her first solo album I Like You. Ryan Cayabyab held auditions to find members. The group reformed with the remaining original member James Coronel and new members Shar Santos, Chedi Vergara, and Jayson Angangan. This second batch had successful hits, such as Da Coconut Nut.

In 1993, the group released its third album, Know You Will. James Coronel left the group after completing promotional work for this album. The last batch released their fourth album, Death Penalty, and disbanded a year later. In 1998, BMG Records released their fifth and final album, Smokiest Hits.

== Past band members ==
Geneva Cruz moved on to showbiz full-time.

Tony Lambino wrote songs, did musical theatre, and anchored an early morning news program on ABS-CBN. He finished his undergraduate studies at the Ateneo De Manila University, cum laude, completed his master's degree at Harvard University as a Fulbright scholar, and earned a PhD from University of Pennsylvania's Annenberg School for Communication. Tony Lambino also worked at the World Bank in Washington, D.C., and became head of communication at the International Rice Research Institute (IRRI). He is a former Assistant Secretary of the Philippine Department of Finance.

Jeffrey Hidalgo completed his Chemical Engineering degree at the University of the Philippines. In 2009, he studied film making at the New York Film Academy in Abu Dhabi.

James Coronel owns call centers in the United States, Philippines, India, and Sri Lanka.

Chedi Vergara released a solo album, Chedi.

Shar Santos participated in season four of American Idol.

Jayson Angangan returned to his native land in Ilagan, Isabela.

Anna Fegi joined the group in 1994 for the final tour in Japan as she replaced Shar Santos. Anna released 2 solo albums under the Sony BMG label. She owns and operates a music school, Brown Academy of Music.

== Reunions ==
In March 2011, all Smokey Mountain members re-united to record a new song for Japan earthquake relief, I Feel What You Feel.

In May 2020, the members reunited virtually for a Bayanihan Musikahan special. They performed a Paraiso/Better World medley as well as Da Coconut Nut. The performance was shown on ABS-CBN, and streamed as a fundraising effort for the coronavirus pandemic.

On 30 June 2020, the group held another virtual reunion for the World Wildlife Fund.

== Lineups ==
Original lineup (1989–1991)

- James Coronel
- Geneva Cruz
- Tony Lambino
- Jeffrey Hidalgo

Second lineup (1991–1993)

- James Coronel
- Jayson Angangan
- Chedi Vergara
- Shar Santos

Third lineup (1994)

- Jayson Angangan
- Chedi Vergara
- Shar Santos
- Anna Fegi (replaced Shar Santos for Japan tour)

== Discography ==
Smokey Mountain (1990, Universal Records)

- Not All the World is America
- Mama
- Street People
- Earth Song
- Better World
- Kailan
- Escape
- Can This Be Love?
- Steal to Eat
- Sabihin Mo

Paraiso (1991, BMG Music Philippines)

- King Philip
- Nahan Ka?
- Da Coconut Nut
- Paraiso
- Sama Na Kayo
- Wanna Say No
- Kahit Habang Buhay
- Hideaway
- Best Friend
- Kailan (Boy Version)
- Freedom

Paraiso (Japan Edition) (1992, BMG Japan)

- King Philip
- Paraiso
- Tayo Na (Come On)
- Nahan Ka?
- Sama Na Kayo
- Wanna Say No
- Kahit Habang Buhay
- Da Coconut Nut
- Hideaway
- Best Friend
- Kailan (Boy Version)
- Freedom

Know You Will (1993, BMG Music Philippines)

- One Less Lonely Heart
- I Believe in You
- A.S.A.P.
- Why Do You Tell Me
- Stand Up
- I'm in Love with You
- She Has Gone
- Without You
- Shall We Dance
- We Can Change the World

Singles (1993, BMG Japan)

- Dakishimetai (I'm in Love with You)
- Two Hearts (Japanese Song)
- Stay Away
- Tokyo Rhapsody

Death Penalty (1994, BMG Music Philippines)

- Death Penalty
- When Doors Close
- Leave Me Forever
- Ikaw Lang
- What's Wrong With Dat
- Learn To Love
- You Can't Expect
- Sama 'Ko (Interlude)
- You Make Me Feel Good
- I Get So Lonely
- Ai Shite Ruyo
- Magbalik Ka Sana
- Sabi Mo
- Being Free
- We Share the Earth

Smokiest Hits (1998, BMG Music Philippines)

- Paraiso
- Kailan
- Da Coconut Nut
- I Believe in You
- Kahit Habang Buhay
- Can This Be Love?
- Mama
- Nahan Ka?
- One Less Lonely Heart
- Sabi Mo
- What's Wrong With Dat
- Better World

A Song For Japan (Single) (2011, Ivory Music and Video)

- I Feel What You Feel

Greatest Hits (Digitally Remastered) (2012, Ivory Music and Video)

- Kailan
- Can This Be Love
- Da Coconut Nut
- Kahit Habang Buhay
- Paraiso
- Mama
- Sabihin Mo
- Nahan Ka?
- What's Wrong With Dat
- Tayo Na (Come On)
- Street People
- Sabi Mo
- Earth Song
- Better World
- Kailan (Boy Version)

A Bayanihan Musikahan Special (COVID-19) (2020, ABS-CBN)

- Da Coconut Nut (Tropical Version)
- Better World/Paraiso (Medley)

== Cover Songs From Various Artists ==
- Can This Be Love (Cover by Sarah Geronimo)
- Da Coconut Nut (Cover by National Artist For Music Ryan Cayabyab and now recently covered Nations Girl Group Bini)
- Kailan (Cover by Gary V., MYMP Band, Noel Cabangon and now recently cover OPM Pop Rock Band by Nextone Band)
