= Brown Academy of Music =

Music school in Cebu City, Philippines

Coordinates: 10.33900°N 123.91180°E

Brown Academy of Music Cebu, Inc.
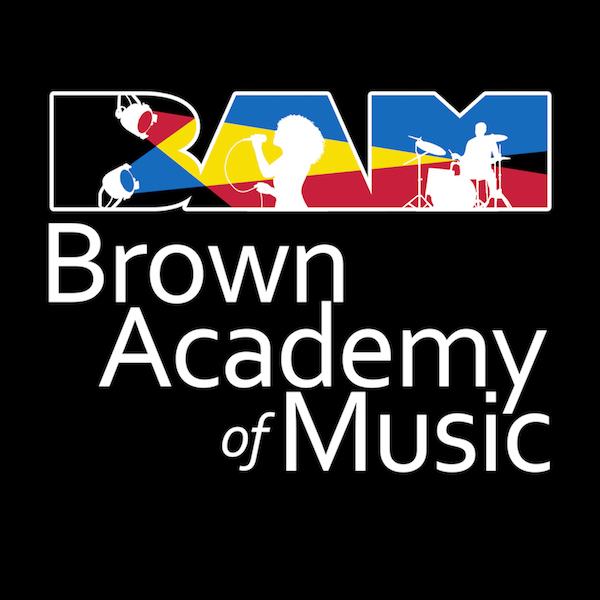
- Type: Corporation
- Industry: Music Education
- Founded: Cebu City, Philippines in 2015
- Founder: Adam Brown, Anna Fegi-Brown
- Headquarters: Cebu City, Philippines
- Key people: Adam Brown, Anna Fegi-Brown
- Products: Music lessons, Private Instruction, Group Lessons and Classes, Children's Music Classes, Dance
- Services: Music Education
- Website: www.bamcebu.com

Brown Academy of Music is a performance-based music school located in Cebu City, Philippines. It is located on the 2nd Floor of Northgate Centre in Banilad on Gov. M. Cuenco Avenue, across the street from Gaisano Country Mall and next to University of Cebu-Banilad. The school serves as one of the premier sources of music education in the city of Cebu. The school not only serves as the foundation of music study for its students, but also provides performance venues for the students to showcase their talents.

== Before opening ==
Brown Academy of Music Cebu, Inc. was founded by Adam Brown and Anna Fegi-Brown in 2015. The corporation was approved by the Securities and Exchange Commission in October. Brown was born in Cincinnati, Ohio and has a background in music education with a Bachelor of Music in Music Education from the University of North Texas as well as a Master of Science in education. He served as a musician and musical director for a number of years for Royal Caribbean International performing in over fifty countries on six continents. Fegi-Brown is a well-known international singer who has performed not only throughout the Philippines, but around the world. She has released two solo albums under the Sony BMG label and performed on the popular show ASAP on the ABS-CBN television network and The Filipino Channel (TFC). Anna won the Grand Prize of the ABS-CBN's Himig Handog competition in 2003 by interpreting the song Kailan Kaya Kita Mamahalin. Her performances abroad include several international tours as well as two years in the featured role of Nala in the Festival of the Lion King at Hong Kong Disneyland as well as several years as a featured singer with Royal Caribbean International being a part of several take out casts and new projects while performing in over sixty countries.

It was during their time working for Royal Caribbean International that the couple met and were eventually married in 2012 in Cebu City. They created the school from their passion in music and teaching and serves as their way to give back to the next generation of musicians. They traveled to over 70 countries while performing and also researched the music of cultures around the world during their travels. Not only focusing on traveling and performing, they both wrote a series of travel articles published by Cebu Daily News.

== Opening and offerings ==
Brown Academy of Music formally opened on 8 January 2016 in the Northgate Centre on Gov. M. Cuenco Avenue in Banilad. In just its first few months, the school not only took enrollment for their regular lessons classes, but also taught classes at multiple academic schools in Cebu and also presented a voice workshop at Ayala Center Cebu. The school held a songwriting workshop with award-winning songwriter, producer, and musical director Jude Gitamondoc.

The school developed a one-of-a-kind series of music classes for babies and toddlers. The first class, for children 6 months to 2 years old, features instruction for both a child and an adult. The second class, for ages 3 to 5 years, is based upon the fundamentals of music education using fun activities and games and prepared the students for further music study in the future whether they would want to learn voice or an instrument. Both classes continue to be popular offerings of Brown Academy of Music. In 2017 the classes were renamed the Aria Music program in honor of the owners' child.

In July 2016, while only being open for six months, Brown Academy of Music announced that they would be expanding. The additional area includes additional teaching areas, a faculty workroom, a 35+ square meter rehearsal facility, and a larger, air conditioned waiting area for the parents and students. The expansion was found to be necessary to accommodate the growing number of enrollees and rehearsal requirements and was completed by September 2016.

2018 marked another year of growth at Brown Academy of Music. A second expansion took place at the beginning of the year, taking the total space of the school to 250 square meters. Three additional teaching rooms were added along with offices and waiting areas and the rehearsal facilities were doubled in size. In the summer of 2018, the school had a record number of enrollees with over 275 between their studio in Banilad and a voice workshop held at Ayala Center Cebu. In their first three years of operation, Brown Academy of Music taught over 1,900 different students, hosted 12 major culminating shows, and performed at numerous community and corporate events through Metro Cebu.

== Events and workshops ==
In 2016, after operating for three months, Brown Academy of Music held a summer workshop at Ayala Center Cebu. The students performed at an end-of-summer culminating show held at Ayala Terraces.

Throughout 2017, several students from the school appeared on the televised singing competition Tawag ng Tanghalan, which is a part of the show It's Showtime on the ABS-CBN network. Students also appeared on The Voice and other television shows and events. In the summer of 2017, Brown Academy of Music offered a dance program for the first time in cooperation with The Knapsack Dancers of Cebu and its head choreographer, Monica Orellano. After initial success, the dance program has become a permanent course offering. In August and September, the school offered another songwriting course taught by Jude Gitamondoc.

In July 2017, Brown Academy of Music organized a workshop in Cebu with legendary Maestro Ryan Cayabyab. The workshop covered the contemporary a cappella genre and raised awareness and support for the Akapela Open, an annual contemporary a cappella vocal competition held in Manila. Two contemporary a cappella vocal groups from the school performed as part of the workshop.

On 31 October 2017 Brown Academy of Music was a stop on the world audition tour for Norwegian Creative Studios, which casts singers and dancers for Norwegian Cruise Line, Oceania Cruises, and Regent Seven Seas Cruises. In March 2019, Brown Academy of Music was the venue for the world audition tour for Carnival Cruise Line.

In the summer of 2018, the school held another workshop at Ayala Center Cebu as a part of their summer workshop series. The course was a combination of voice, dance, and stage performance. The students enrolled performed as part of a summer culminating show, held at Ayala Terraces.

In August and September 2018, Brown Academy of Music hosted their third songwriting course with Jude Gitamondoc. Two of the original songs written as part of the workshop were performed on 22 September 2018 at the school's culminating show, held at Ayala Center Cebu. One of the two songs, "Breakup, Countdown," was chosen to be further produced and was released through digital distribution. A lyric video was also released through social media. The song was produced by Jude Gitamondoc and executive produced by BAM Productions, a new venture of Brown Academy of Music.

In 2019, it was announced that Brown Academy of Music would be the partner school for the first ever iShine Music Workshop in Cebu. The workshop is held in two venues in the Philippines, at The Music School of Ryan Cayabyab in Metro Manila and at Brown Academy of Music in Cebu. The workshop is a project collaboration of Promil iShine, The Music School of Ryan Cayabyab, and Brown Academy of Music. All teachers in both venues were personally trained by the National Artist for Music, Maestro Ryan Cayabyab.

== The BAM Method ==
Brown Academy of Music is one of the few schools in Cebu City that teach the fundamentals of music. Students not only learn how to perform, but they also learn important elements of music such as reading sheet music and basic music theory. The BAM Method is described as teaching music in a building block method from the very foundation to bringing the student to the advanced level. Owner Adam Brown has also authored and published a music textbook and workbook titled, Fundamentals of Reading Music. The school employs a combination of full-time and part-time teachers and teach voice, dance, drums, guitar, bass guitar, keyboard, and violin. Brown Academy of Music also offers a one-of-a-kind series of music classes for babies and toddlers, ranging from the age of six months through 5 years old. The curriculum has been designed specifically for those age categories and meets United States Department of Education, National Association for Music Education, and DepEd standards.

== Performances ==
Brown Academy of Music not only teaches the students music but also provides venues for their students as a means for them to showcase their talent. In place of a traditional recital, the school offers gigs in public venues throughout the city. Some of the advanced students are also selected for various public events, serving as opening acts or sharing the stage with professional, national acts. The school currently produces four major shows a year (April, June, October, and December) featuring all of their enrollees for each session. The shows range in themes and give the students the opportunity to showcase their talents in a public setting.

The school's first performance was alongside Anna Fegi in "Turn Up the Music" at the Terraces at Ayala Center Cebu on Saturday, 9 April 2016. The evening also featured appearances by Derek Ramsay, Nico Antonio, and Shaina Magdayao to promote their movie My Candidate. The show also featured a guest performance of the hit Bisaya song HAHAHAHasula with the song's writer Jude Gitamondoc and Jacky Chang, who is a member of the teaching faculty.

In the first summer the school was open, students from Brown Academy of Music performed at SM City Cebu for the 8th anniversary event of the ABS-CBN television show MAG TV Na, performed as a part of the ABS-CBN television show Kapamilya Mas Winner Ka, and recorded a song for the ABS-CBN outreach program Project Lapis Kapamilya. The experiences offered by the school has helped continue to boost enrollment numbers. In June 2016, students from Brown Academy of Music performed as a part of the kick off for the 2016 Cebu Business Month, as well as Pasundayag 2016, a project of Cebu City. Also in June 2016, owner Anna Fegi-Brown along with other members of Brown Academy of Music performed for the President of the Philippines, Rodrigo Duterte.

During the first show of 2017, the school created a theme for the culminating show by featuring an artist. The April show was a tribute to Michael Jackson, not only as a way to teach his music, but also a history of popular music and his influence on the new generation of artists.

In summer of 2017, the school's second summer in operation, Brown Academy of Music surpassed 200 enrollees for the first time. Their end of summer culminating show was held on 3 June at the Terraces at Ayala Center Cebu and with Sheryn Regis as a guest performer. Regis was a finalist in the first season of Star in a Million on ABS-CBN and has released four solo albums under the Star Records label.

In September 2017, the school paid tribute to the genre of Original Pilipino Music with their show OPM Jam sa BAM, held at the Activity Center of Ayala Center Cebu. The show featured over 90 students plus the faculty members, making it the largest show during a non-summer session at Brown Academy of Music.

During the show of April 2018, the school paid tribute to The Beatles. Throughout their lessons, the students learned about the history of the group as well as early rock and roll and pop music and the influence that the band had on generations of musicians since. During the summer sessions in 2018, Brown Academy of Music broke another enrollment record and had over 275 students enrolled. In September 2018, the school returned to the genre of OPM, continuing the trend of having the third show of each year highlight OPM.

The first show of 2019 was announced to be a tribute to the musical genres of Motown, Soul, and R&B. The show coincided with the 60th anniversary of the founding of Motown Records.

== Elite BAMStars ==
In June 2016, auditions were held for a select group of vocal students directed and produced by Anna Fegi-Brown. This group consists of students enrolled at Brown Academy of Music and performs throughout the city and region for different events and television tapings. Students from the group have performed on episodes of the ABS-CBN television show Kapamilya Mas Winner Ka. The group has also performed at venues around Cebu City such as Ayala Center Cebu, SM City Cebu, Robinsons Galleria Cebu, SM Seaside City Cebu, and Fuente Osmeña.

In July 2016, Brown Academy of Music students performed as opening acts for Star Magic actors Bea Alonzo, Gerald Anderson, and Bailey May. They performed as a part of the mall promotional tour for the Star Cinema film How to Be Yours and also Bailey May's Cebu mall appearance. In August the group performed for another episode of Kapamilya Mas Winner Ka on ABS-CBN as well as the annual Cebu City Cancer Fair held at SM Seaside City Cebu along with celebrities Matteo Guidicelli, Donna Cruz, Anna Fegi-Brown, and Marissa Sanchez. In December 2016, BAM was invited to perform for the Cebu tour for the Metro Manila Film Festival entry and international award-winning movie Die Beautiful, starring Paolo Ballesteros.

In 2017, the Elite BAMStars performed in the February concert of international artist David Pomeranz at Waterfront Hotel Cebu. Several members have also performed for various events with the ABS-CBN network. In October and November, the group performed for both the 20th anniversary event of Cebu City Marriott Hotel as well as their annual Christmas tree lighting and Global Customer Appreciation Night. They also performed in November with legendary Filipino songwriter and performer Jose Mari Chan as well as in concert with Kyla, KZ Tandingan, Angeline Quinto, Jaya, Erik Santos, and Anna Fegi-Brown.

In February 2018, some of the members, called the Elite BAMStar Divas, performed as part of the show MAJA ON STAGE CEBU, starring Maja Salvador, at the IC3 Pavilion. At the end of August 2018, the Elite BAMStars performed at The Terraces at Ayala Center Cebu as part of an event before Manila-based band Rocksteddy took the stage. In November 2018, the group performed as part of the Bloom Music Festival along with IV of Spades, The Wonggoys, Three Legged Men, and Vincent Eco. The music festival was held at the Sky Hall of SM Seaside City Cebu.

In October 2019, a group of six Elite BAMStars performed in Metro Manila as part of the 2019 Pinoy Playlist Music Festival. The music festival promotes OPM across genres and across generations. The festival, held at the BGC Arts Center in Taguig, is curated by National Artist for Music Ryan Cayabyab, Moy Ortiz of The Company, and Noel Ferrer. The performance marked the first time a group from Brown Academy of Music performed in Metro Manila.
