= Manila Philharmonic Orchestra =

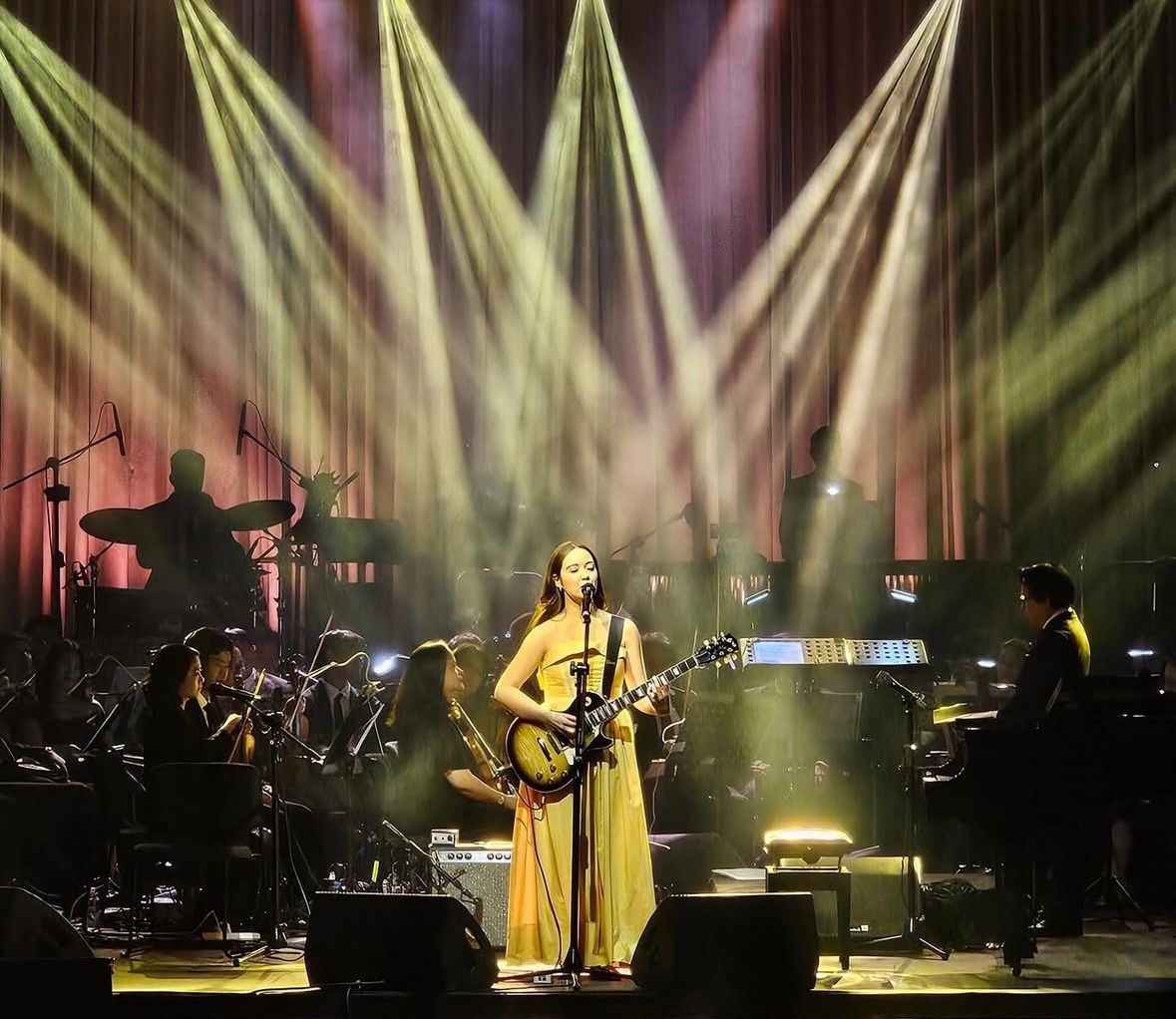
The Manila Philharmonic Orchestra performing with Icelandic singer Laufey in 2024

The Manila Philharmonic Orchestra (MPO) is an orchestra based in the Philippines, founded in 1998. It is organized and managed collectively by its musicians, who are involved in artistic and administrative decision-making. The orchestra performs in various formats, including full symphony and chamber ensembles, and has participated in a range of activities such as classical concerts, musical theater productions, and private or corporate events. It has collaborated with local and international performers and has taken part in regional events, including the 2013 Asia Orchestra Week in Tokyo. In addition to its performances, the MPO has engaged in community-based projects and music education programs aimed at broadening access to music and supporting the development of young musicians.
