= SM City Cebu =

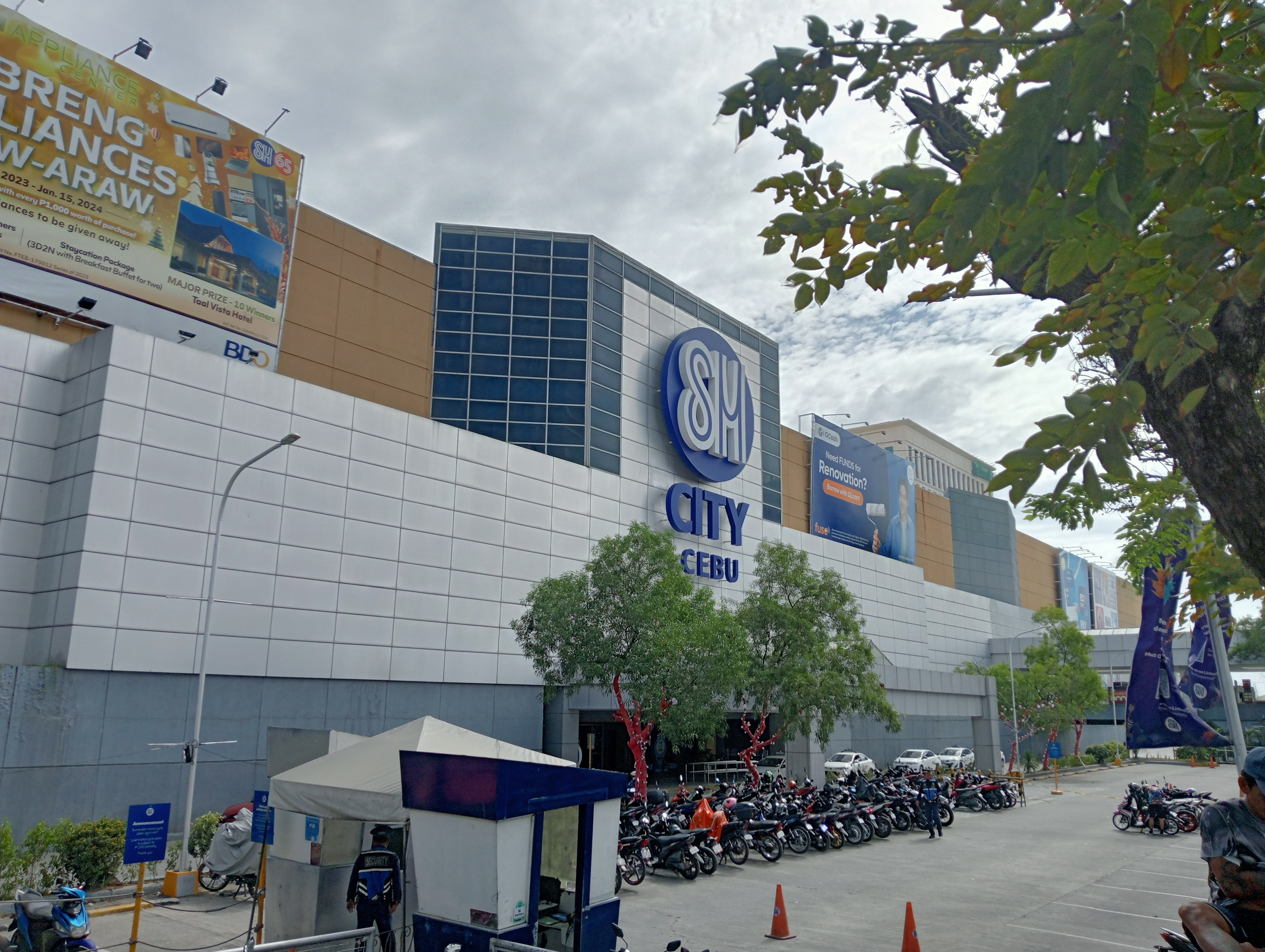
- The facade of SM City Cebu in 2024
- Location: Cebu City, Philippines
- Coordinates: 10°18′40″N 123°55′5″E
- Address: Juan Luna Avenue cor. Cabahug and Kaoshiung Streets, North Reclamation Area, Brgy. Mabolo, Cebu City
- Opened: November 27, 1993; 32 years ago
- Developer: SM Prime Holdings
- Owner: SM Prime Holdings
- Num. of stores: 800+
- Num. of anchor tenants: 19 (as of 2026)
- Floor area: 268,000 m^{2} (2,880,000 ft^{2})
- Floors: 4 (Main building); 6 (Northwing)
- Parking: 3,400
- Public transit: 01K Urgello; 03Q Mabolo; 04L Lahug; 06H Guadalupe; 08F Alumnos; 10H 10M Bulacao, Pardo; 12G 12I Labangon; 20A 21A 22A 21D 22D Mandaue; 23A Pajo Terminal - Robinsons Galleria Cebu; 23D MEZ 2 Estate - Robinsons Galleria Cebu; 24 24A Consolacion; 25 Liloan; 26 Compostela; 27 Danao; SU IT Park - Cordova; Liloan-SM via Cansaga Tabunok-Colon-SM; MB Mactan–Cebu International Airport; MB Parkmall, SM J Mall - SM Seaside City; MB Anjo World; KMK Minglanilla, Naga
- Website: SM City Cebu

SM City Cebu, also known locally as SM Mabolo, is a large shopping mall located in Mabolo, Cebu City, Philippines. It is the 4th shopping mall owned and developed by SM Prime Holdings, the country's largest shopping mall owner and developer. It is the company's first shopping mall outside Metro Manila. It has a land area of 18 hectares (44 acres) and a gross floor area of 268,000 m^{2} (2,880,000 ft^{2}).

More than 150,000 people visit SM City Cebu daily, with the figure reaching 180,000 to 200,000 on weekends. Due to Cebu City's position as a transshipment point for the Visayas and Mindanao, and the mall's location close to the city's port area, the mall attracts a significant number of transient shoppers.

== History ==
=== Development ===
The mall is the first SM Supermall to be built outside of Metro Manila. Construction began in 1991, and was eventually opened on November 27, 1993, with a gross floor area of 146,000 square metres (1,570,000 ft^{2}). It was seen as catering to the broad low and middle-class shoppers, in contrast to its upscale competitor, the Ayala Corporation-owned Ayala Center Cebu, which opened a year later.

Located in Cebu City's North Reclamation Area, then a quiet and relatively remote part of the city, the mall had Manila-based movie and television stars and entertainers perform free concerts at the mall to attract shoppers. Free jeepney rides to the mall were also offered to fulfill the lack of available public transportation within the area.

From 1993-2004, the mall's exterior colors were painted in blue and white stripes, symbolizing the sea, beach, and the sky. The mall's interiors originally had sea and underwater themes. In 2005, the exterior facade was renovated and the walls were painted in beige, two years prior to the construction of the Northwing.

=== Northwing ===
Construction on SM City Cebu's expansion building, dubbed the Northwing, began in 2006. The expansion was developed at a cost of ₱1.3 billion Pesos (US$30.5 million). It was built on the parking lot to the north of the existing building, temporarily decreasing the number of parking spaces by more than 30%. Construction of the Northwing started in March 2006, and opened on November 30, 2007. It increased the total gross floor area of SM City Cebu by 100,000 m^{2} (1,100,000 ft^{2}), for a total of 246,000 m^{2} (2,650,000 ft^{2}). The first 2 floors are for the mall's expansion of tenant spaces, while the 3rd, 4th, 5th and the roof deck are for more parking spaces.

==== Northwing Expansion ====
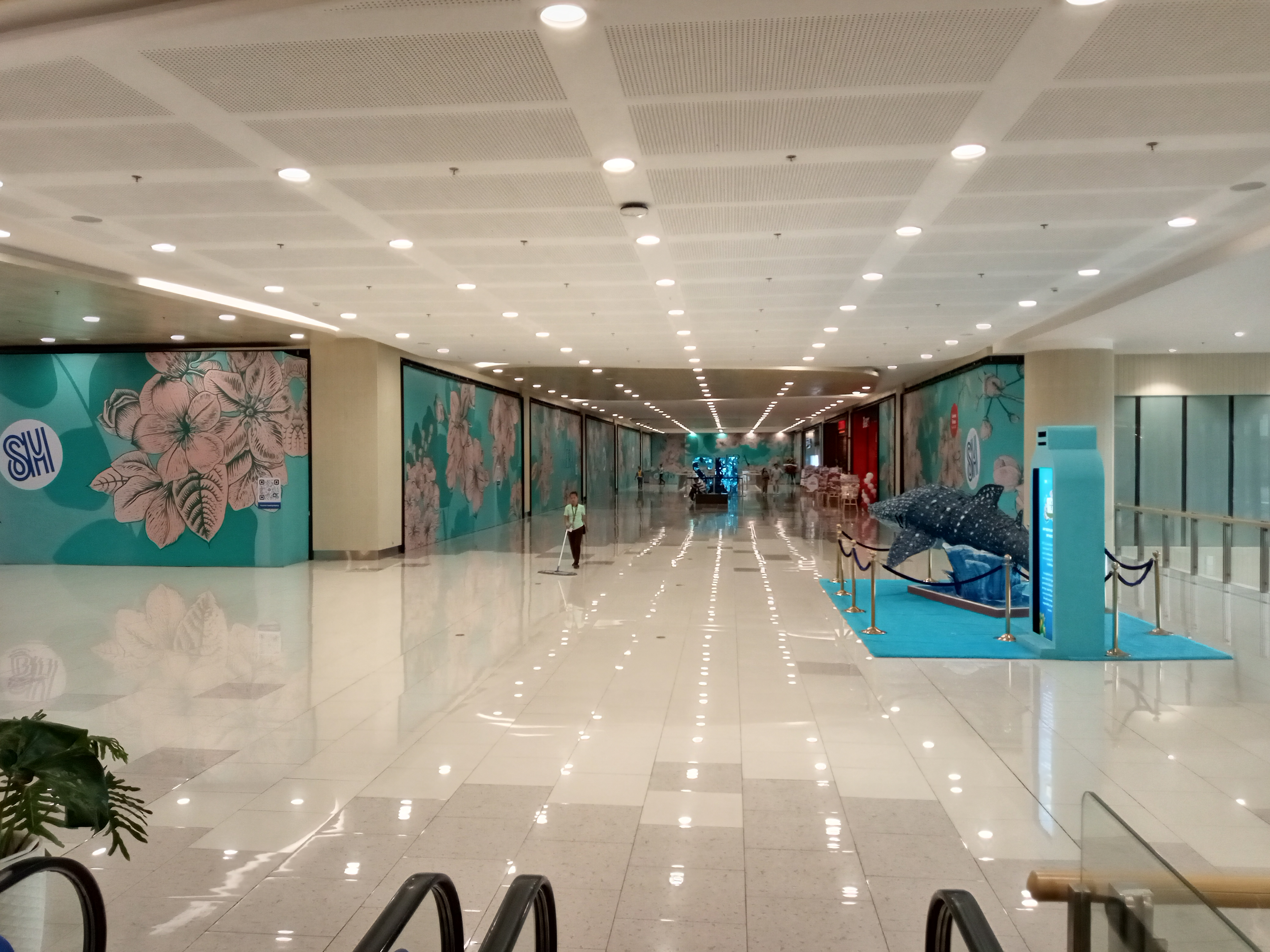
Interior of the Northwing Expansion, July 2025

Years after the completion of the Northwing, an expansion project was planned in 2022, and is now partly completed and continues to undergo development. The project occupies what was previously an open parking area. The expansion features more tenant spaces on the first two floors, more parking spaces for the 3rd, 4th, and 5th levels, two 20-story office towers designed to accommodate business process outsourcing (BPO) companies, as well as a 9-story academic building that will house the Cebu campus of National University. It also includes Our Lady of the Most Holy Rosary Chapel, a Roman Catholic chapel on the second level which opened on December 15, 2025.

== Design ==
SM City Cebu is a seven-level complex that consists of the lower ground, upper ground, second, and third floors, which are used for the mall's tenant spaces, while the additional fourth, fifth, and roof deck are designated parking spaces. It also features a 4-level department store, a supermarket, and a total of six cinemas with three regular cinemas, two Director's Club, and one IMAX theater. It also has 2 food courts, a fully computerized bowling center, an 8,000-square meter amusement center called SM Storyland (now closed), and a 2,000-square meter trade hall (now leased by Ace Hardware). Prior to the addition of the Northwing, it had a car park capacity of 1,629.

The expansion of the mall, dubbed the Northwing, features two floors of retail stores, restaurants, and cafes. It houses more than 200 tenants and caters to a more upscale clientele. The expansion also added three levels of covered parking, and a one level of roof deck parking. In 2008, the interiors of the main mall had its first major renovation in order to match the Northwing's newly updated interior at the time.

The Northwing Expansion, which began construction in 2022, added two floors of retail space and it increased the total gross floor area of SM City Cebu by 22,000 m^{2} (240,000 ft^{2}), for a total of 268,000 m^{2} (2,880,000 ft^{2}) as of 2026 and more retail spaces was transferred or added to the existing Northwing, parking spaces, a National University branch, and BPO office spaces. Around this time, the mall also had its 2nd major interior renovation.

In 2023, some tenant spaces on parts of the 3rd floor of the main mall were demolished, and were converted into the new Food Hall, which opened in 2024; this is the 2nd Food Hall in Cebu after the one in SM J Mall, which will co-exist alongside the old Foodcourt located on the lower ground floor.

As of 2026, the mall's overall interior is still under renovation, while portions of the Northwing expansion and the National University campus were already opened. However, construction of the BPO towers are still ongoing.

== Gallery ==
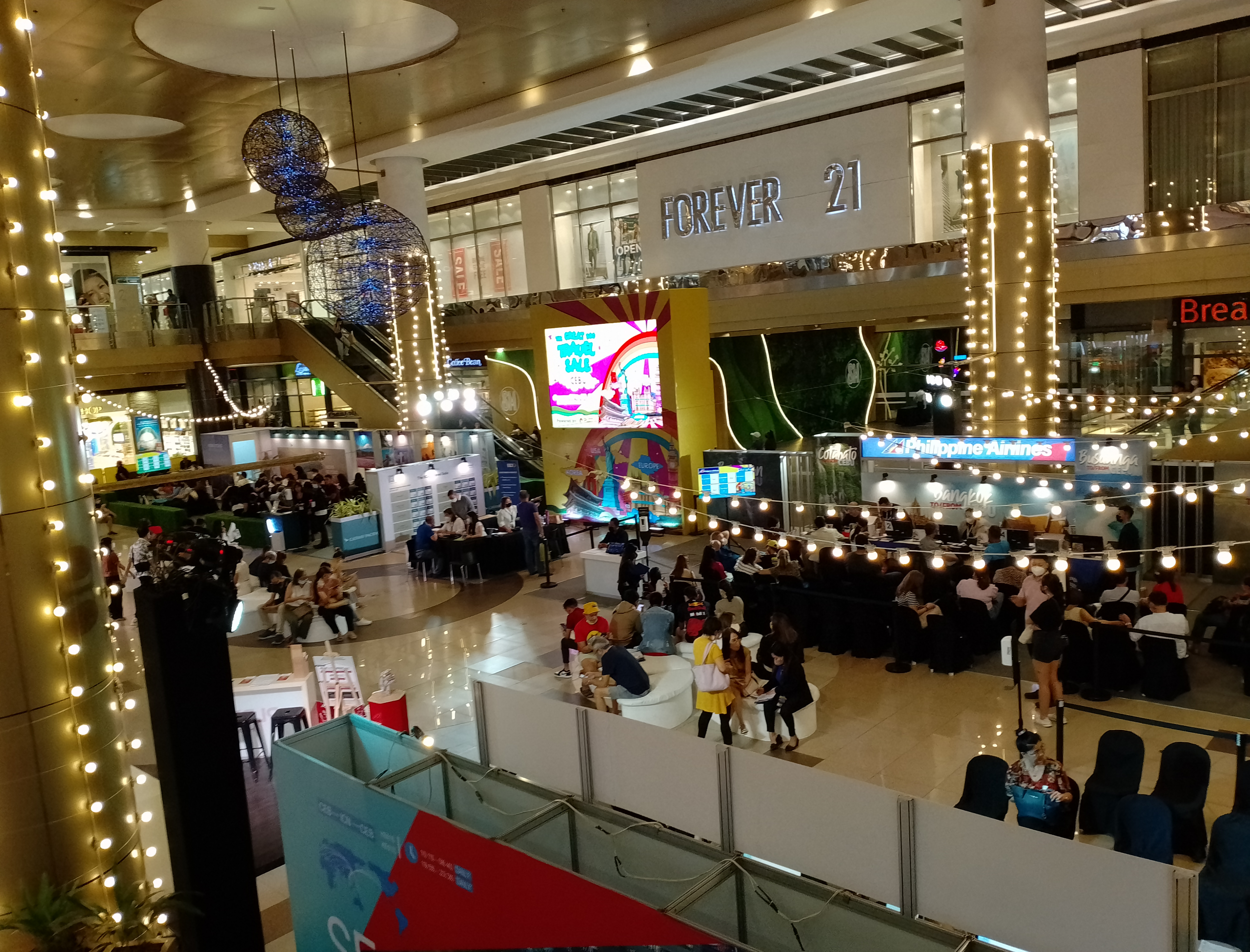
Northwing before the renovation

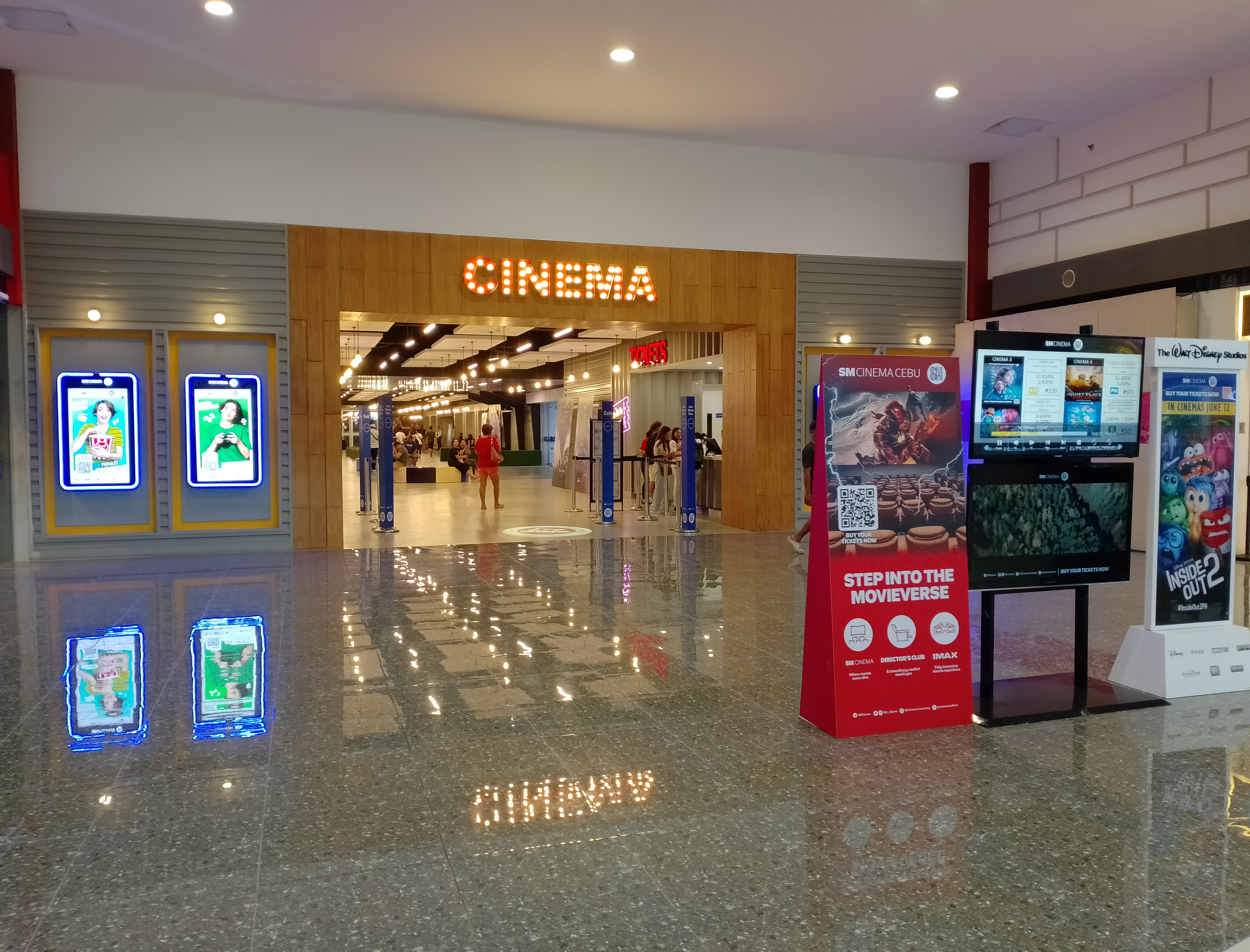
SM Cinema

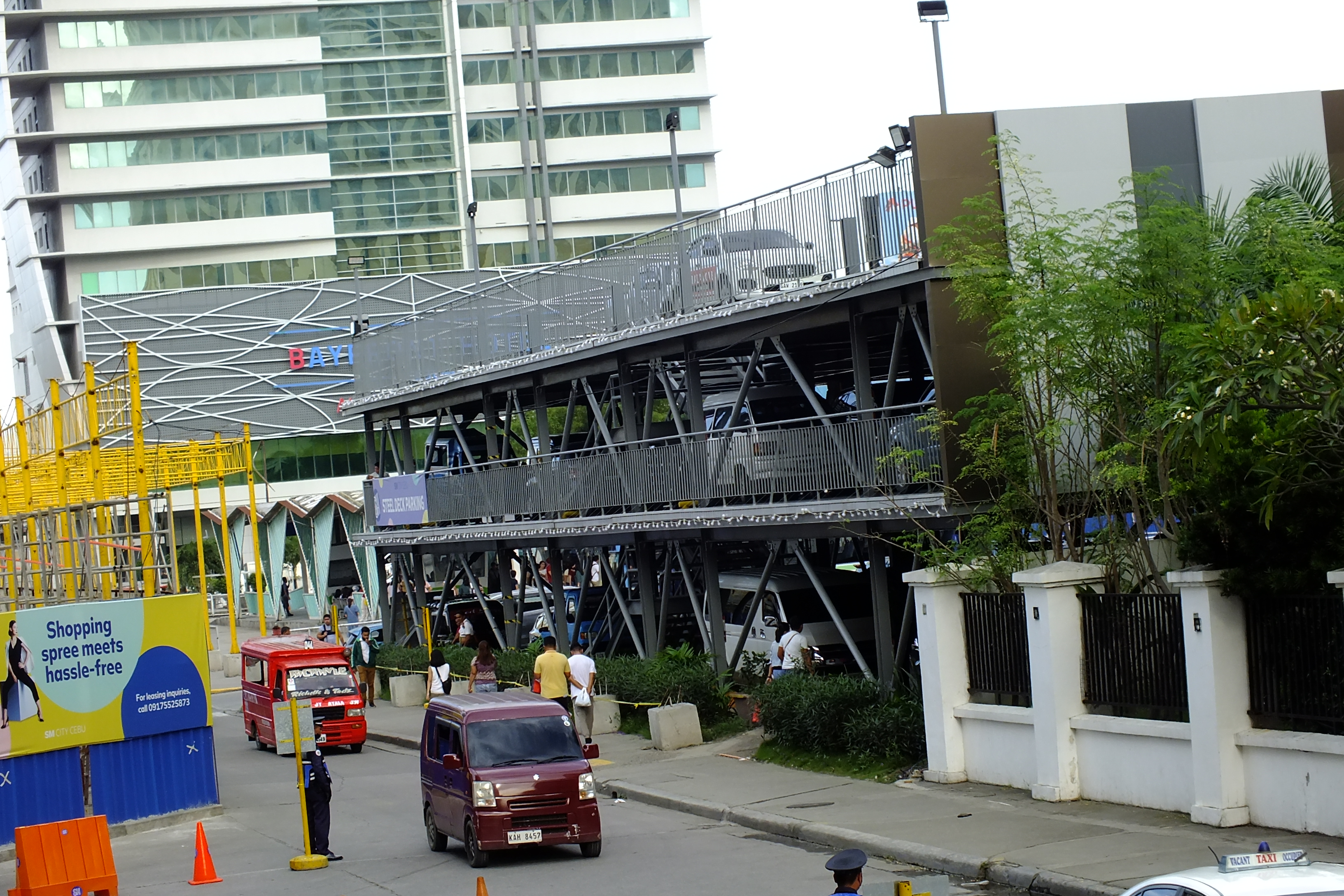
Steel Deck Parking Area

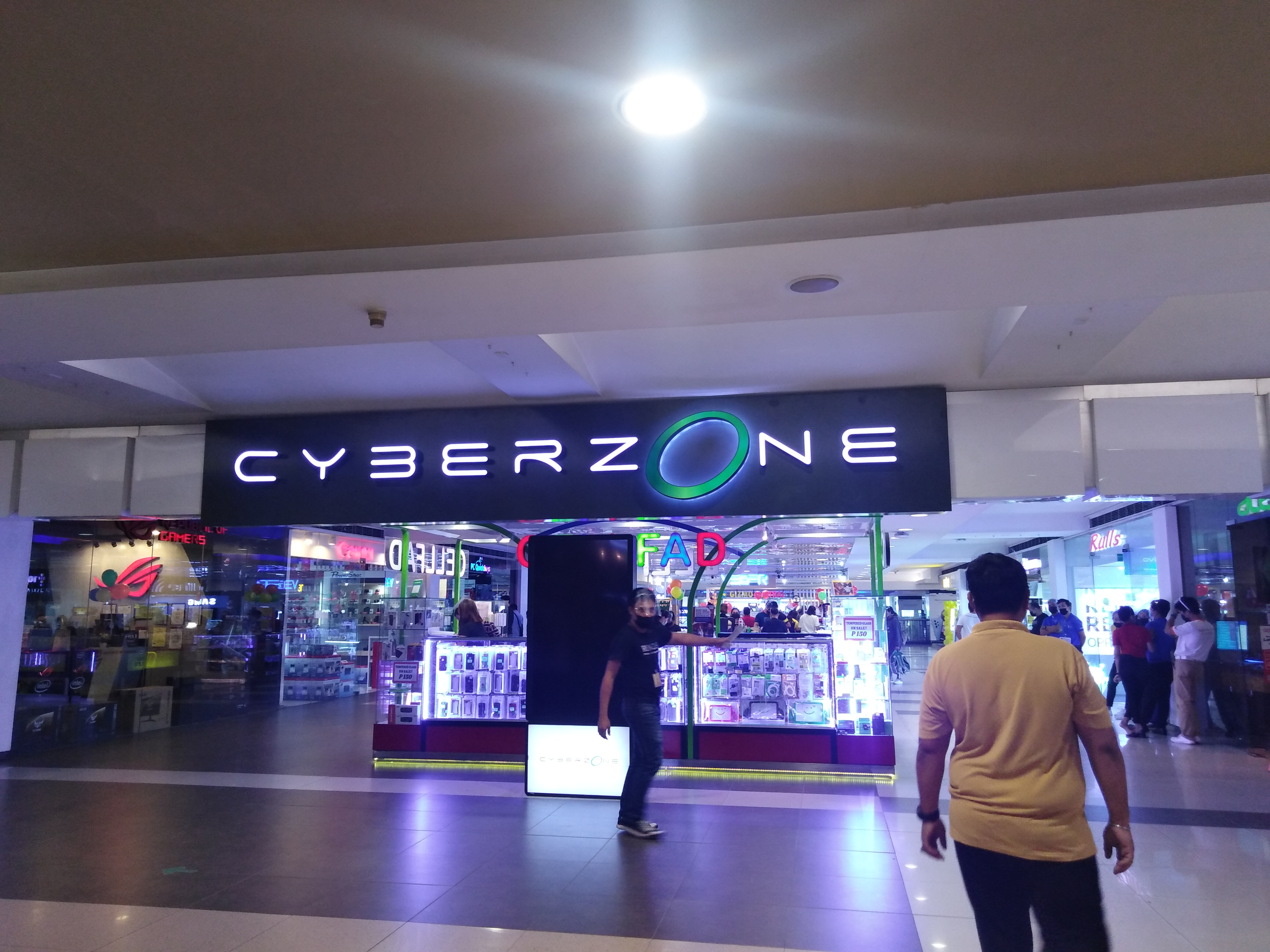
Cyberzone

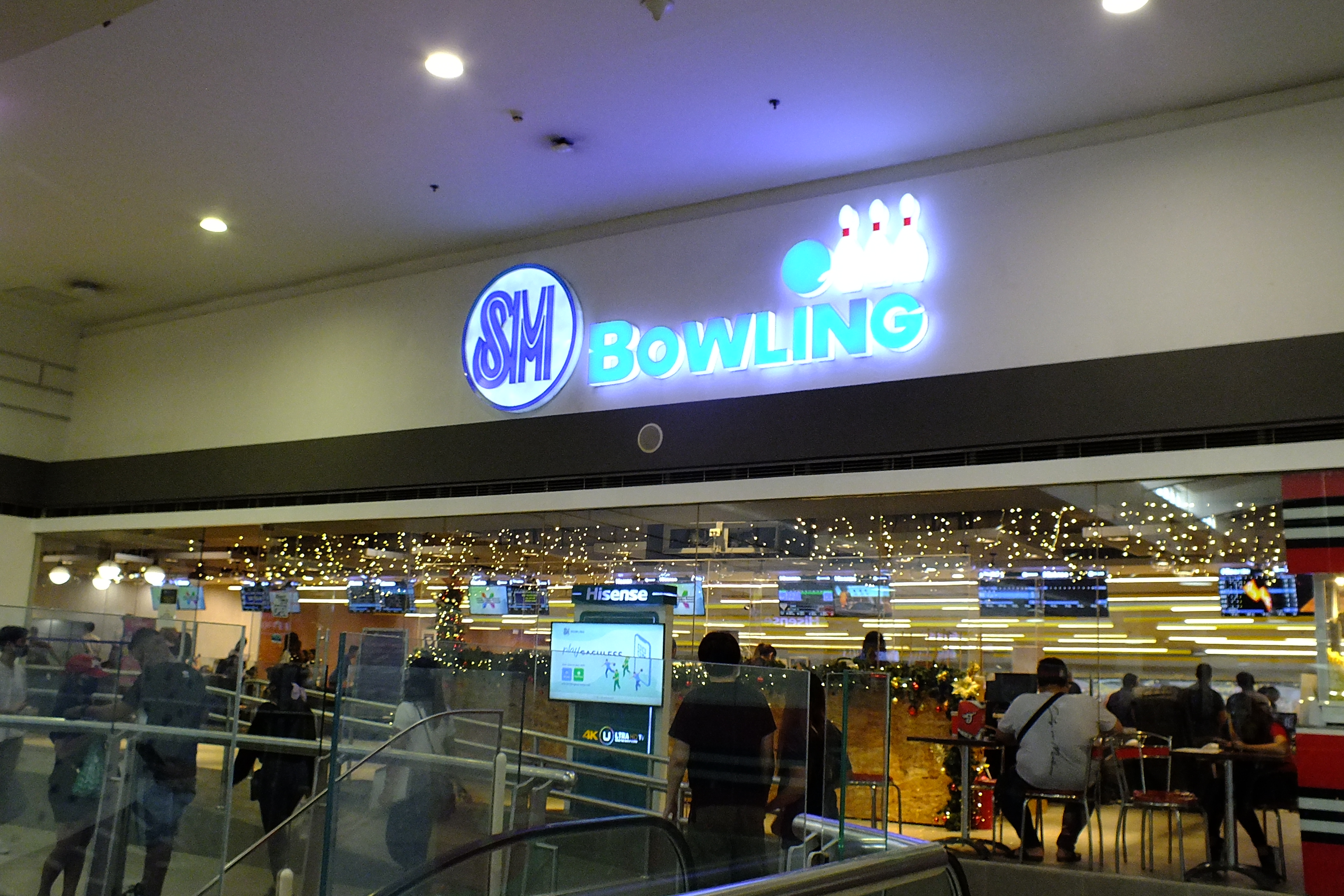
SM Bowling

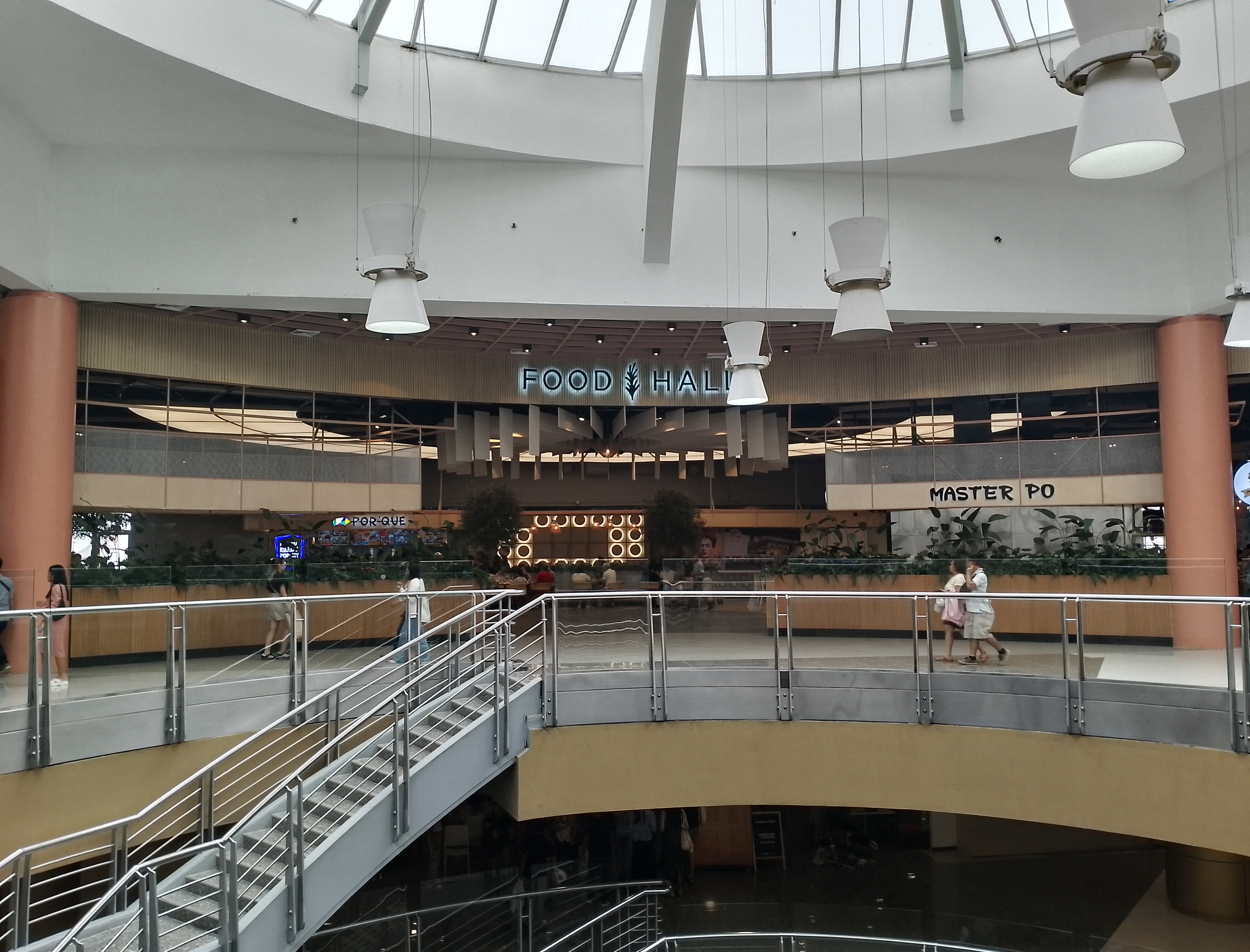
Food Hall

View of concourse from above, 2010

Mall exterior in 2011

Chapel of Our Lady of the Most Holy Rosary

SM Cyberzone

== See also ==
- SM Seaside City
- SM J Mall

Preceded by SM Megamall	4th SM Supermall; 1993	Succeeded by SM Southmall
