= Ayala Center Cebu =

Shopping mall in Cebu City, Philippines

Ayala Center Cebu by Ayala Malls

- Ayala Center Cebu in 2024
- Location: Cebu City, Philippines
- Coordinates: 10°19′4″N 123°54′18″E
- Address: Cebu Business Park, Archbishop Reyes Avenue cor. Cardinal Rosales Avenue, Brgy. Luz, Cebu City
- Opened: November 1994; 32 years ago
- Developer: Ayala Land
- Manager: Ayala Malls
- Owner: Ayala Corporation
- Num. of stores: 680
- Floor area: 290,000 square metres (3,100,000 sq ft)
- Floors: 7 (3 below ground)
- Public transit: 03Q Mabolo; 04L 04M Lahug; 06H Guadalupe; 12L Labangon; 13B 13C Talamban; 14D Ayala-Colon; 20B 21B 22B Mandaue; 62B 62C Pit-os, Brgy. Guba; CIBUS Il Corso, SM Seaside, Ayala, IT Park

Ayala Center Cebu (also known as Ayala Center Cebu by Ayala Malls or simply Ayala by the locals) is a large shopping mall owned by Ayala Malls at the Cebu Business Park in Cebu City, Philippines. It is the first Ayala mall located outside of Metro Manila. It opened in November 1994, one year after their rival mall, SM City Cebu opened. For more than 20 years, it was the only Ayala Mall to bear the word Ayala in its name until Ayala Malls Serin opened in March 2015.

On an average day, more than 100,000 people visit Ayala Center Cebu, with the figure increasing to 160,000 on weekends. It is the centerpiece of the Cebu Business Park Complex.

== Development ==
A redevelopment named "The Terraces" was opened in 2008.

On October 30, 2008, Ayala Center Cebu opened "The Terraces", a ₱600-million project which converted the mall's lagoon area into a food, restaurant and beverage mall expansion.

The mall also added over 200 stores in its four-level retail expansion and a condominium called Park Point Residences. Forty of the 200 outlets opened on December 11, 2013, during the unveiling of the expansion. The ₱2.9 billion expansion completes the retail master plan of Ayala Center Cebu, with an additional 36,500 m^{2} (393,000 sq ft) of gross leasable area.

In 2015, a new office building, called Ayala Center Cebu Tower, was opened on top of the west entrance of the mall. It accommodates business process outsourcing (BPO) offices, and its podium is anchored by a three-level store of fashion retailer, H&M and H&M Home.

In 2016, another condominium in the complex, named The Alcoves, was launched. It was built at the original main entrance of the mall. A three-level expansion of the south entrance serves as the podium of the building which is anchored by a few stores and Japanese fashion retailer, Uniqlo. The retail area of The Alcoves was completed in April 2021.

=== Future redevelopment and expansion ===
Ayala Center Cebu will undergo a major re-development in the first quarter of 2024, set to be completed by 2026. Part of the three-year re-development project is to renovate the mall's interior, enhance the mall’s common areas, parks and garden, elevate entertainment and dining facilities, strengthen merchant mix with flagship stores, more first-in-Cebu and exclusive concept stores. Also, ground clearing for another expansion of the mall located between the Seda Hotel and the previous expansion wing began in 2025. Once completed, this will increase the GFA of Ayala Center Cebu, and is estimated to reach a total GFA of around 280,000 up to 300,000 sqm.

New A-Giant and A-Luxe Cinemas, replacing the former Cinemas 3 & 4, opened in November 2025.

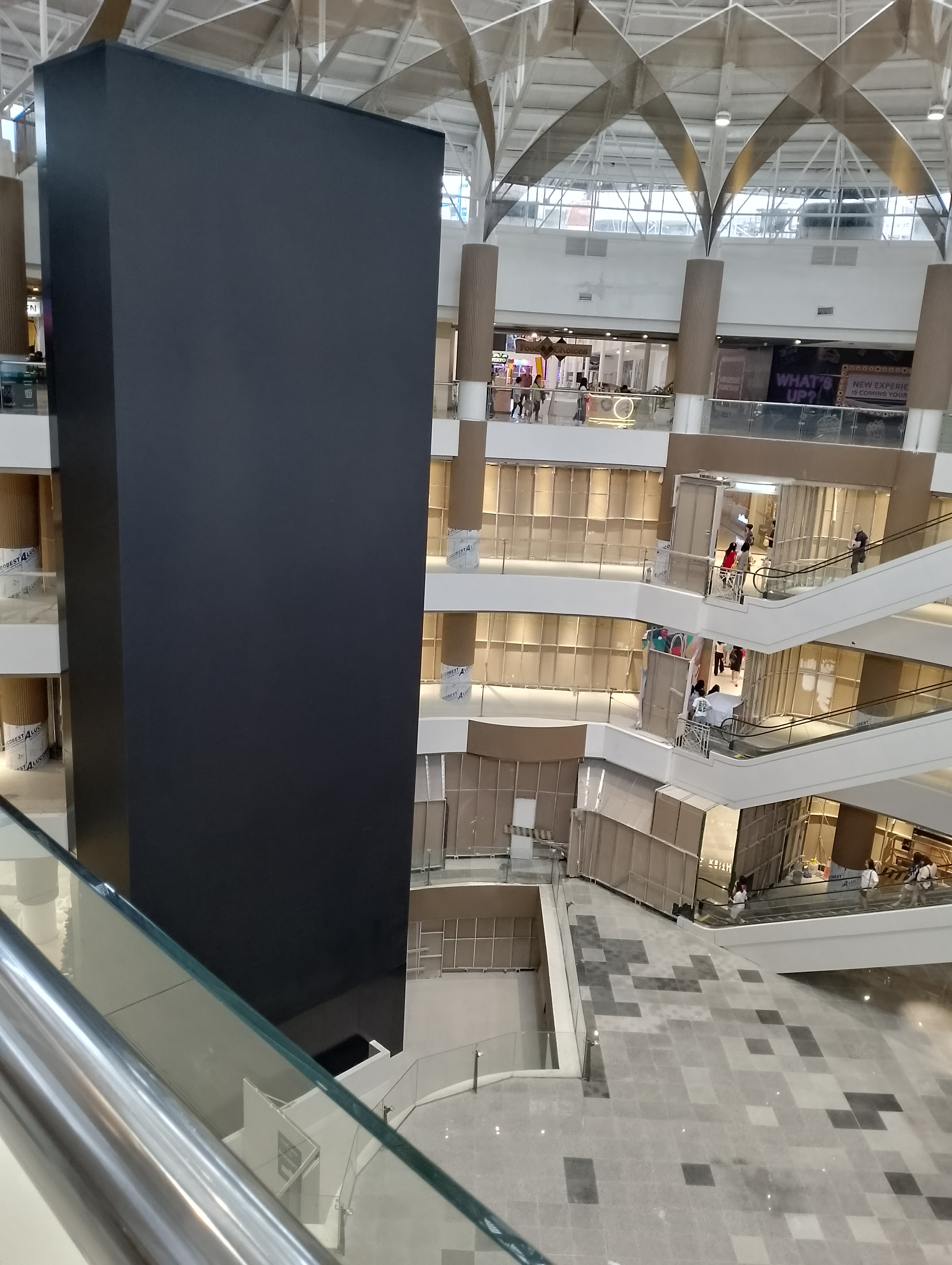
Newly inaugurated LED screen at the renovated main atrium

== Awards ==
- Finalist, Best Shopping Center of the Year (Philippine Retailer's Association and Department of Trade and Industry, 2002)

== Notable incidents ==
=== 2015 fire sprinkler problem ===
On June 15, 2015, the ceiling at the mall's Cinema 5 collapsed at around 8:50 pm, during a launching event of a BPO company, which was caused by a problem with the cinema's fire sprinkler system, being a loose pipe connection. It is also believed that an earthquake that struck the area last March had caused the piping problem. Nine people were reported wounded.

=== Metro Department Store fire ===
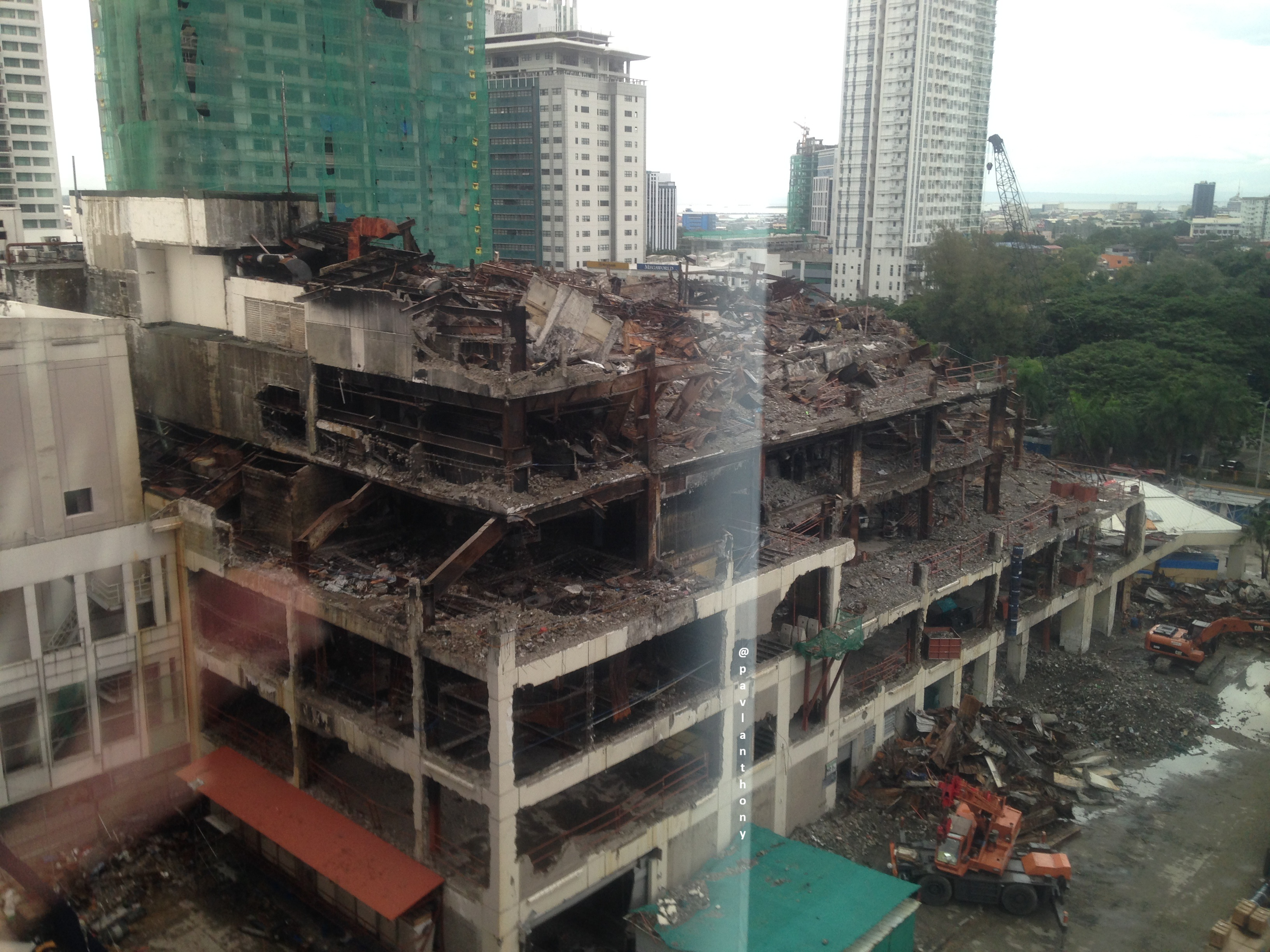
Fire aftermath and reconstruction of Metro Department Store in September 2018

On January 5, 2018, a fire broke out at the Metro Ayala Department Store building. The fire reportedly started at the mall's toy stockroom, located at the third floor of the Metro Ayala building. It took two days to completely extinguish the fire. Despite the damages, no injuries were reported, as the fire started outside of the business hours. The building suffered major damages and the fire rendered the whole Metro Ayala building unsuitable for continued use. Soon, the demolition and reconstruction of a new Metro Department Store was commenced 6 months later.

In December 2018, the supermarket opened on its original location, on a 900 m^{2} (9,700 sq ft) area, on the first level of the main mall. In October 2019, the department store also reopened on a temporary location inside the main mall. The permanent building was completed in late 2020, and had its grand reopening on January 31, 2021.

=== Jude Bacalso Incident ===
On July 21, 2024, a waiter from the Ulli restaurant allegedly misgendered LGBTQ+ prominent figure Jude Bacalso, addressing her as "sir". Furious, she reprimanded the waiter, who stood still and listened for approximately 1 hour and 49 minutes. John Calderon, a witness, described the incident on Facebook. The viral report brought attention to the Cebuano community. Facing backlash, Jude apologized.

Around late August, the Cebu City Prosecutor's Office received multiple complaints of unjust vexation, grave scandal, grave coercion, grave threats and slight illegal detention against Bacalso. The anonymous waiter has decided to continue the filing of the case with his lawyer Ron Ivan Gingoyon.

== Gallery ==
Ayala Center Cebu in 2010

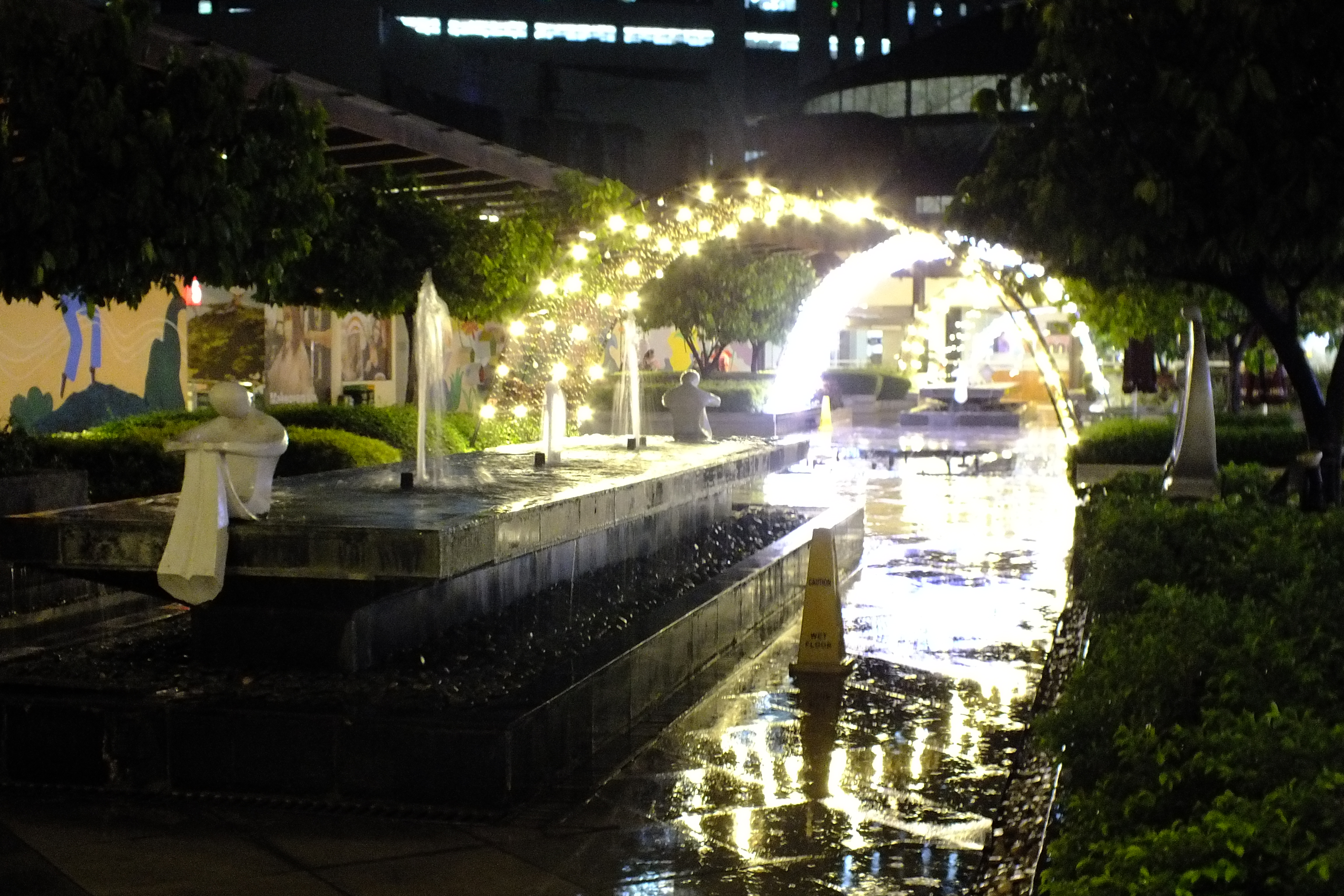
Fountain

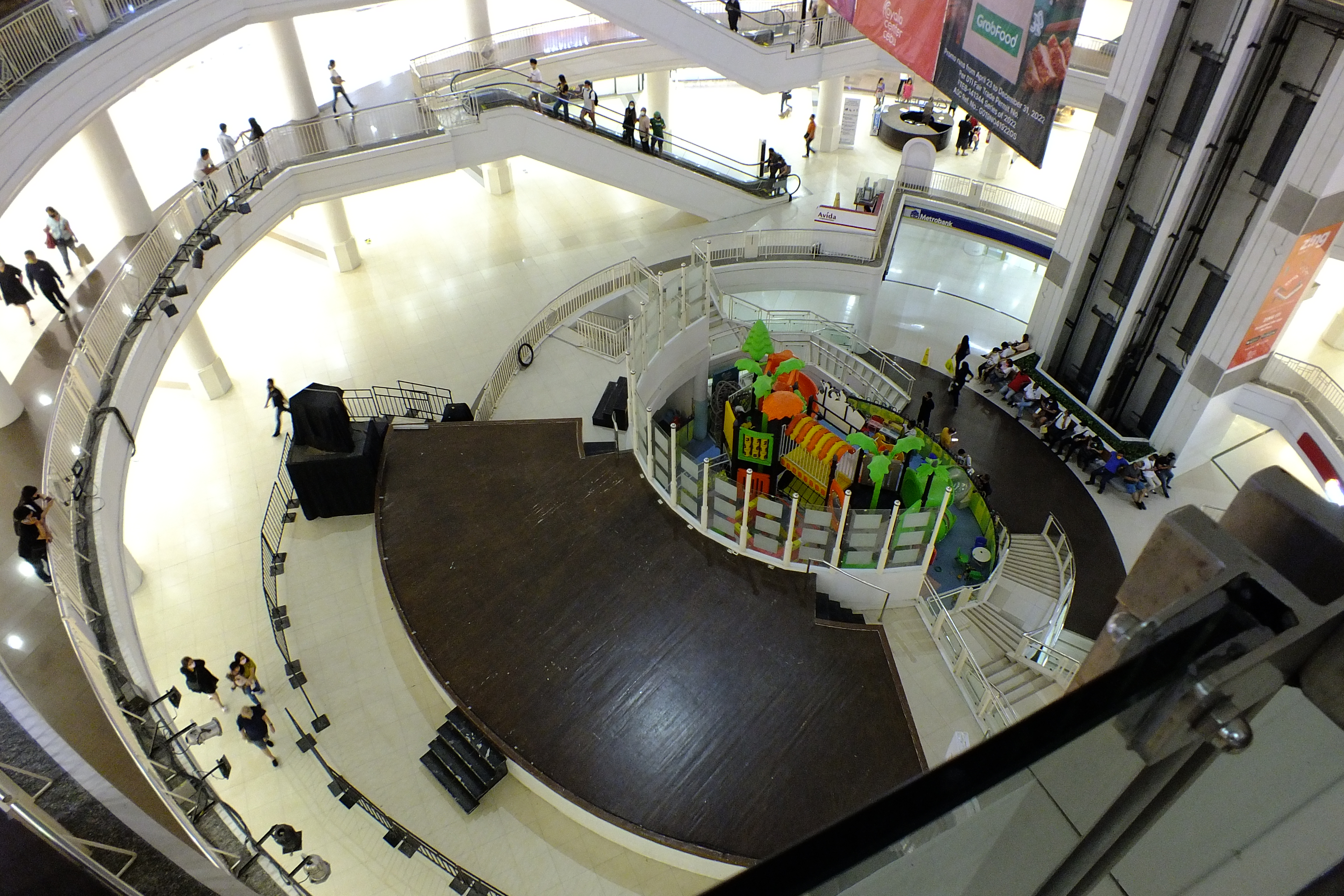
Activity Center (pre-renovation)

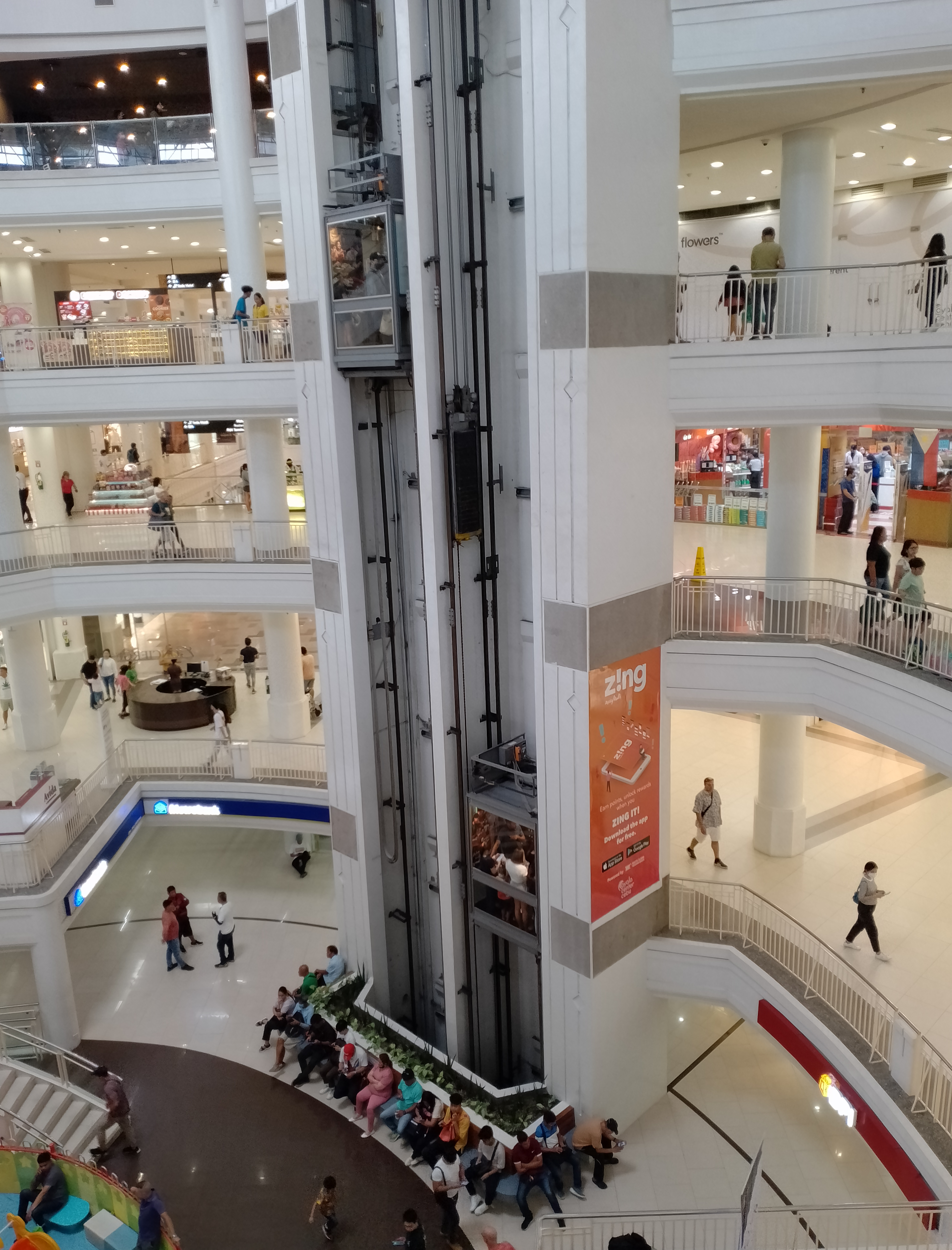
Elevators

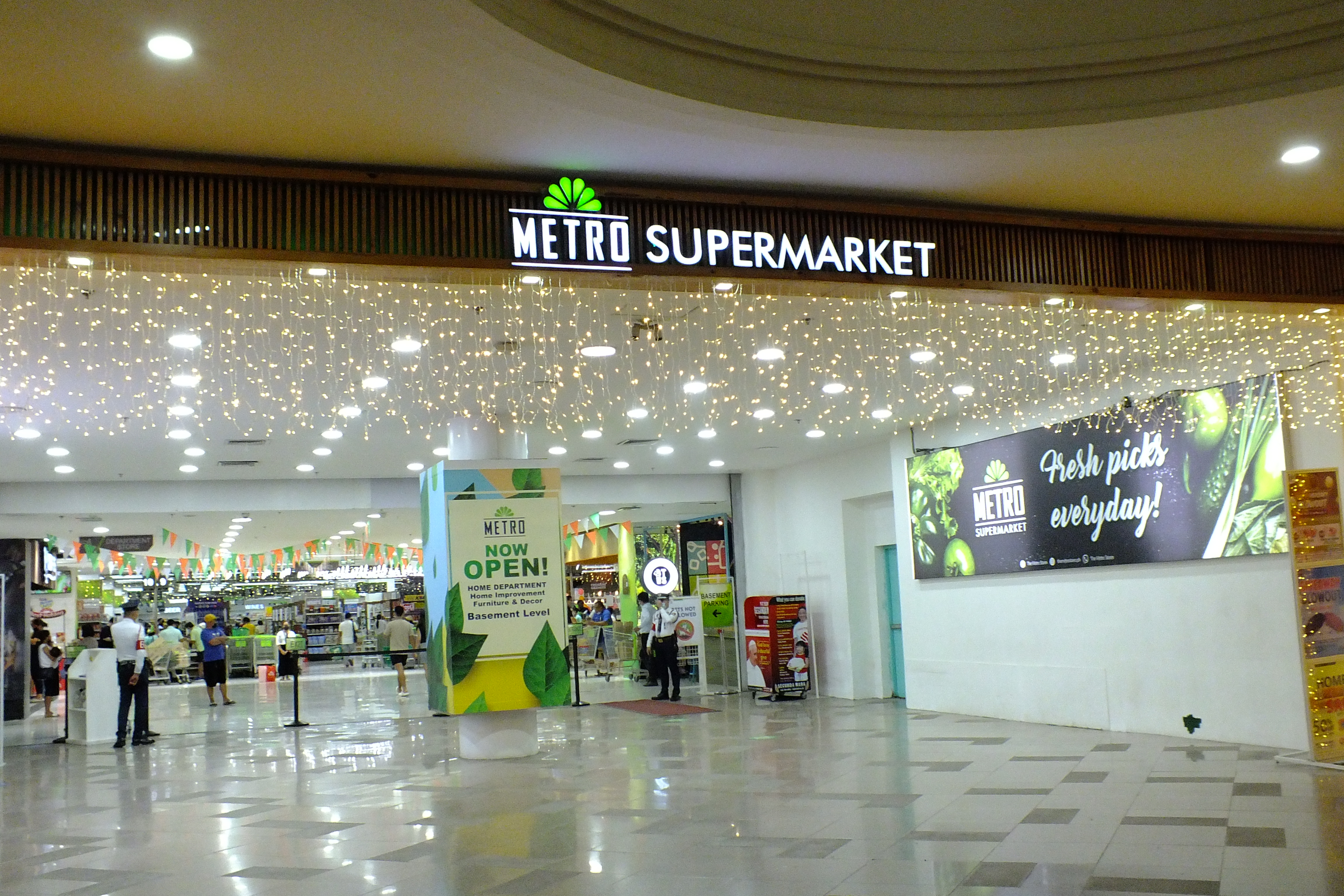
Metro Supermarket

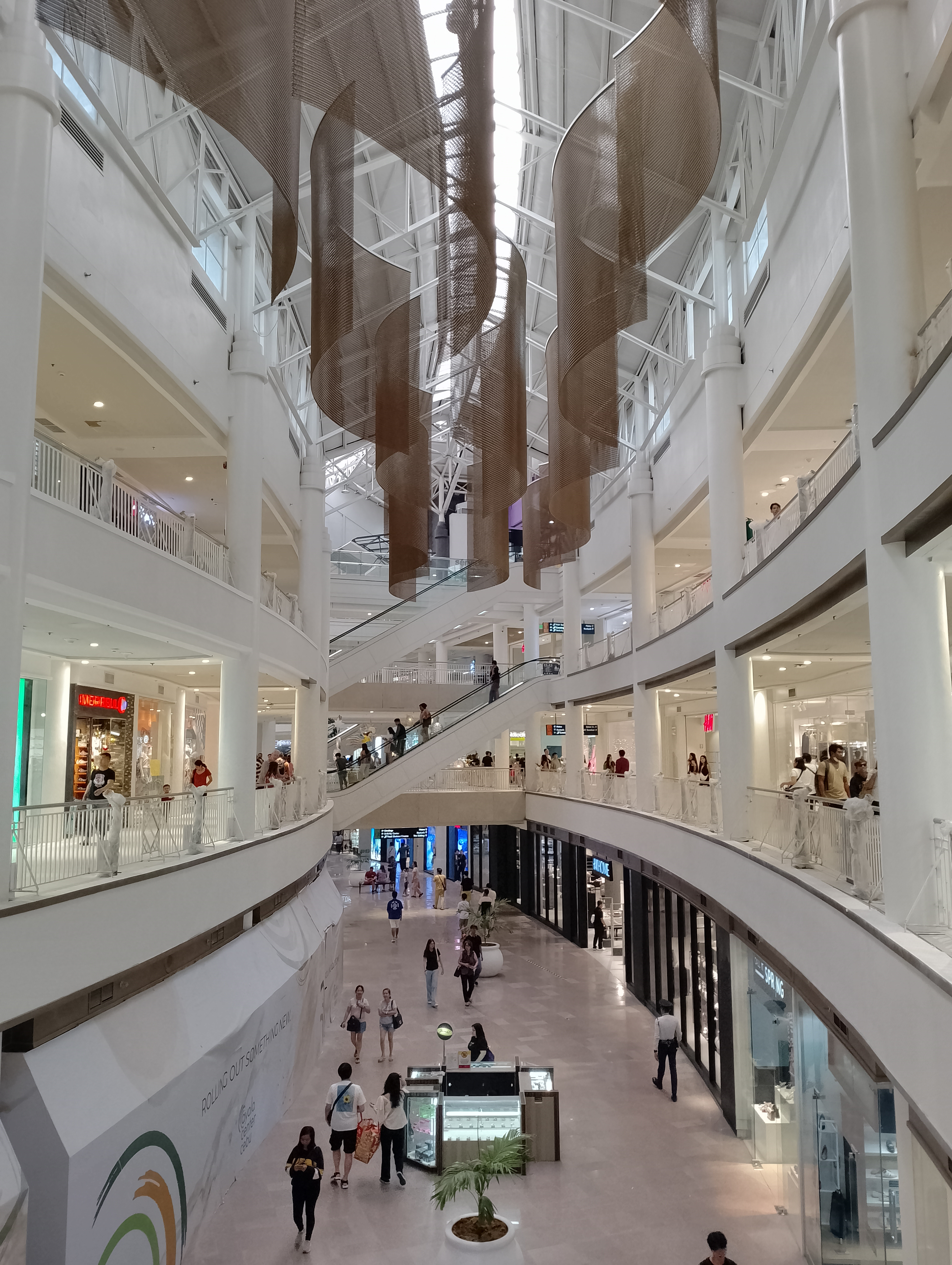
Interior

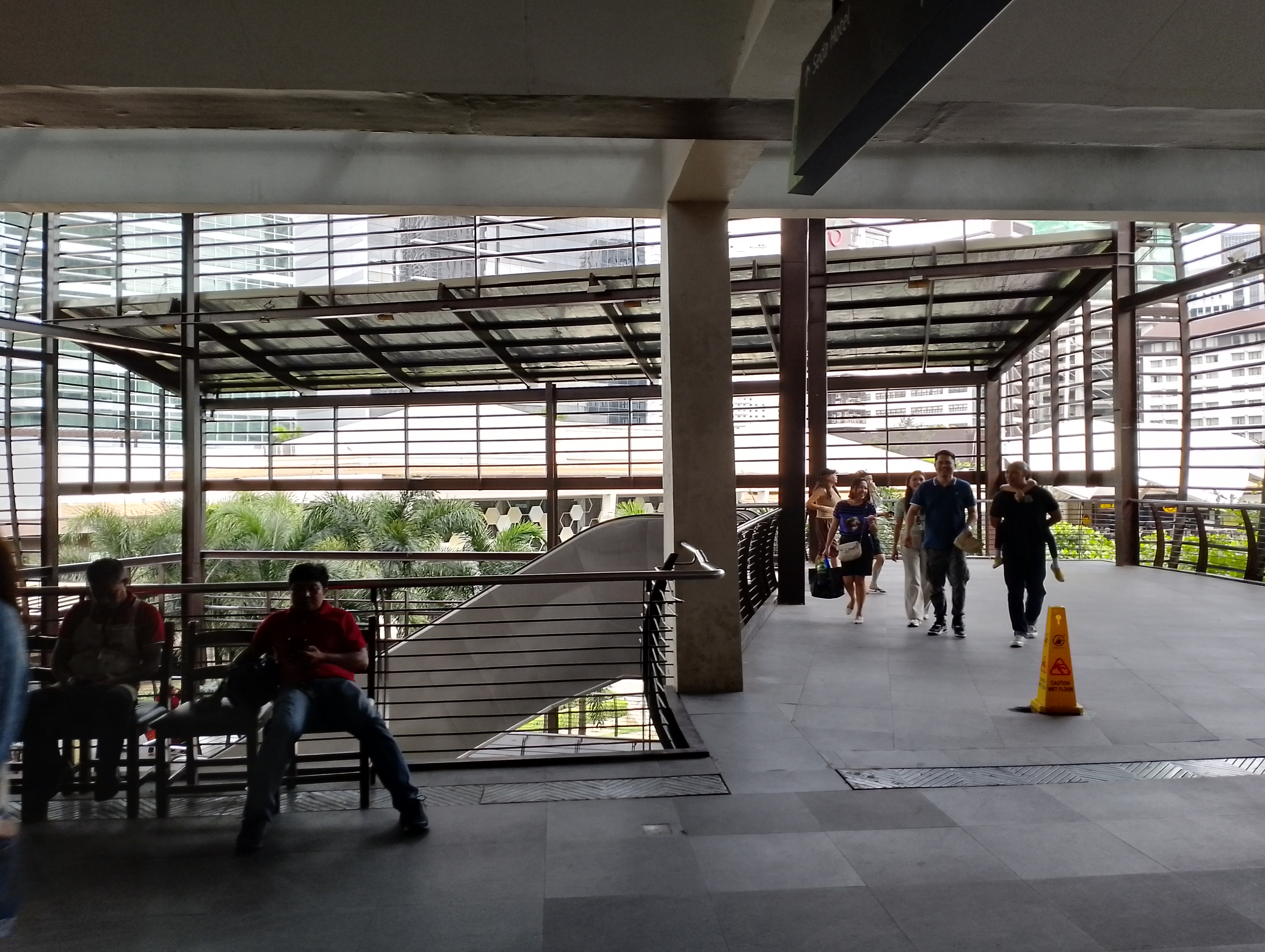
The Terraces

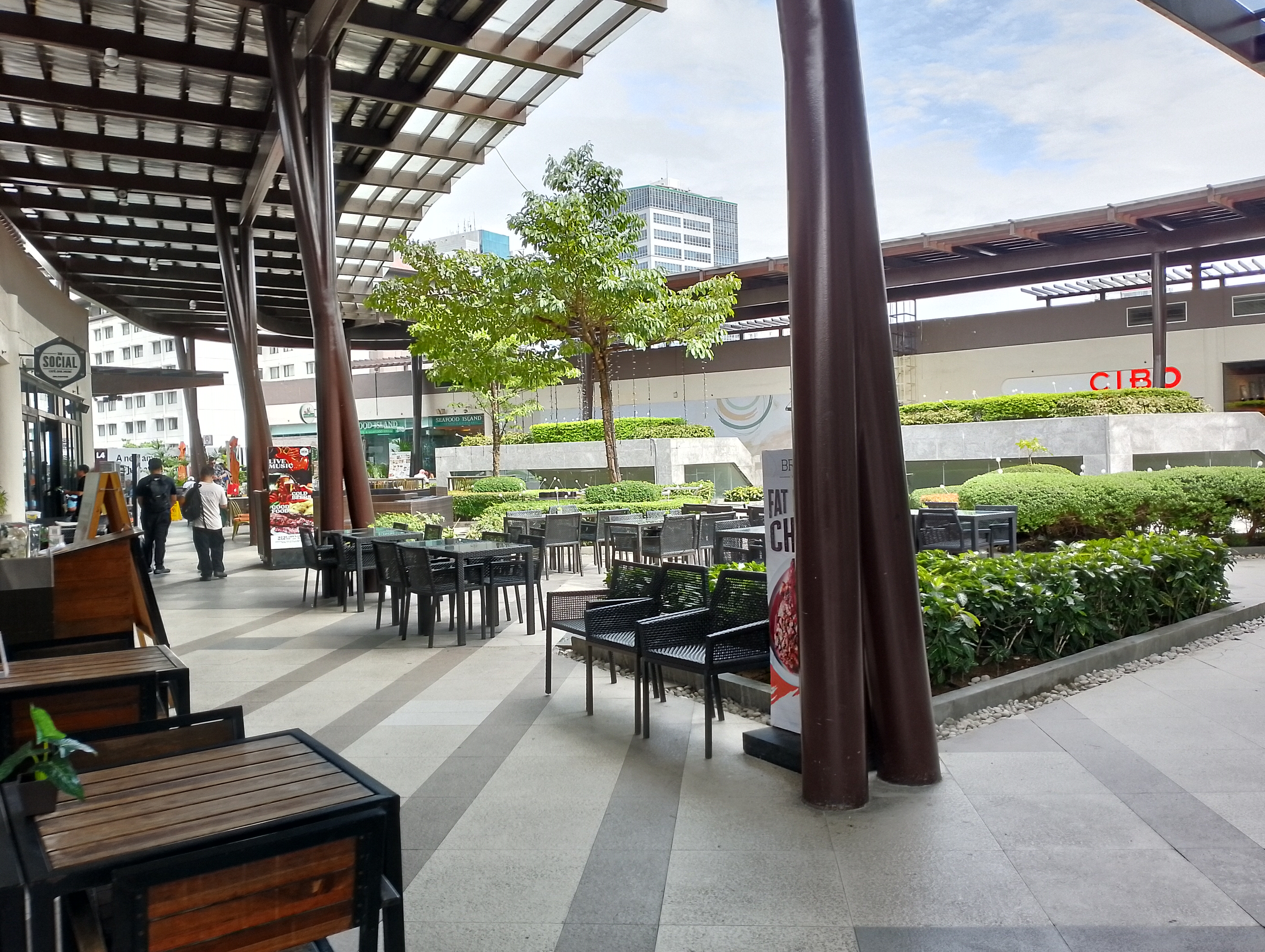
Rooftop

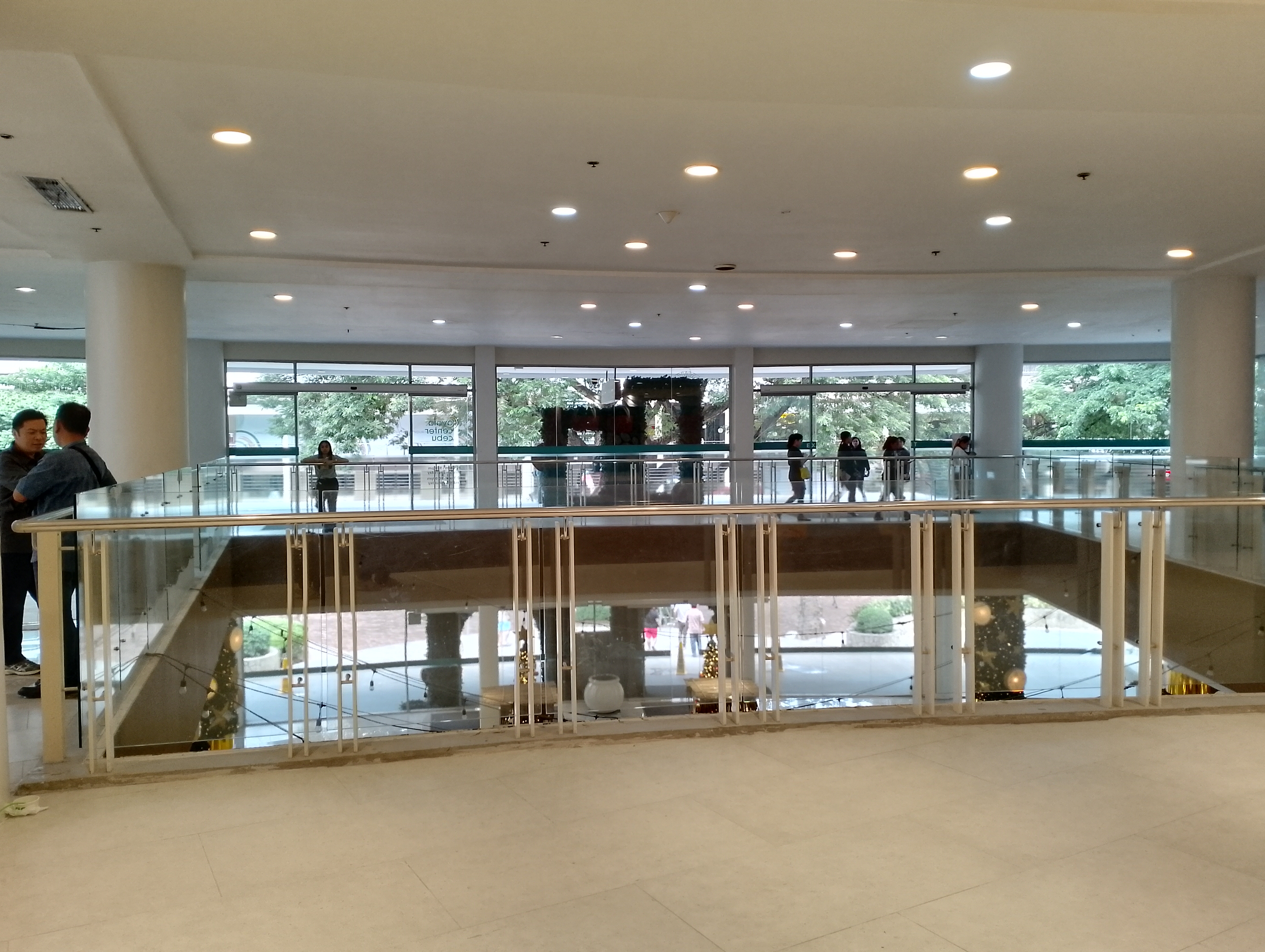
Mall entrance/exit

== See also ==
- Ayala Malls Central Bloc
- SM City Cebu
- SM Seaside City
