= SM J Mall =

- The facade of SM J Mall as SM City J Mall in October 2024
- Location: Mandaue City, Philippines
- Coordinates: 10°20′07″N 123°56′02″E
- Address: A.S. Fortuna Street corner V. Albaño Street, Barangay Bakilid, Mandaue City
- Opened: As J Centre Mall: September 30, 2011; 15 years ago; As SM J Mall: October 25, 2024; 2 years ago
- Closed: As J Centre Mall: January 30, 2023; 3 years ago
- Developer: SM Prime Holdings
- Floor area: 138,000 m^{2} (1,490,000 sq ft)
- Floors: 4
- Public transit: 13H Pit-os - Mandaue; 13I 22H Talamban - Mandaue; 22I Gaisano Country Mall - Mandaue; 24 IT Park - Consolacion; 24F Gaisano Country Mall - Consolacion; 24G Pit-os - Consolacion; 25 Foodland - Liloan; 25B Pit-os - Liloan; 26 Foodland - Compostela; MI-23A Pajo Terminal, Lapu-Lapu City Public Market, Opon; SU Cordova - IT Park; SU MEZ 2 Estate - IT Park; Star8 IT Park - Marigondon; MB Parkmall, SM City Cebu, SM Seaside City
- Website: Official website

SM J Mall, (with the exterior signage as SM City J Mall) also known locally as J Mall, is a shopping mall in Mandaue, Philippines. Opened in 2011 and operated until 2023 as J Centre Mall, the mall was acquired by SM Prime Holdings and was temporarily closed for upgrades and renovations, reopening as SM J Mall on October 25, 2024. It is the first SM Supermall in Mandaue, the 4th SM Supermall in Cebu, and the 86th SM Supermall in the Philippines.

== History ==
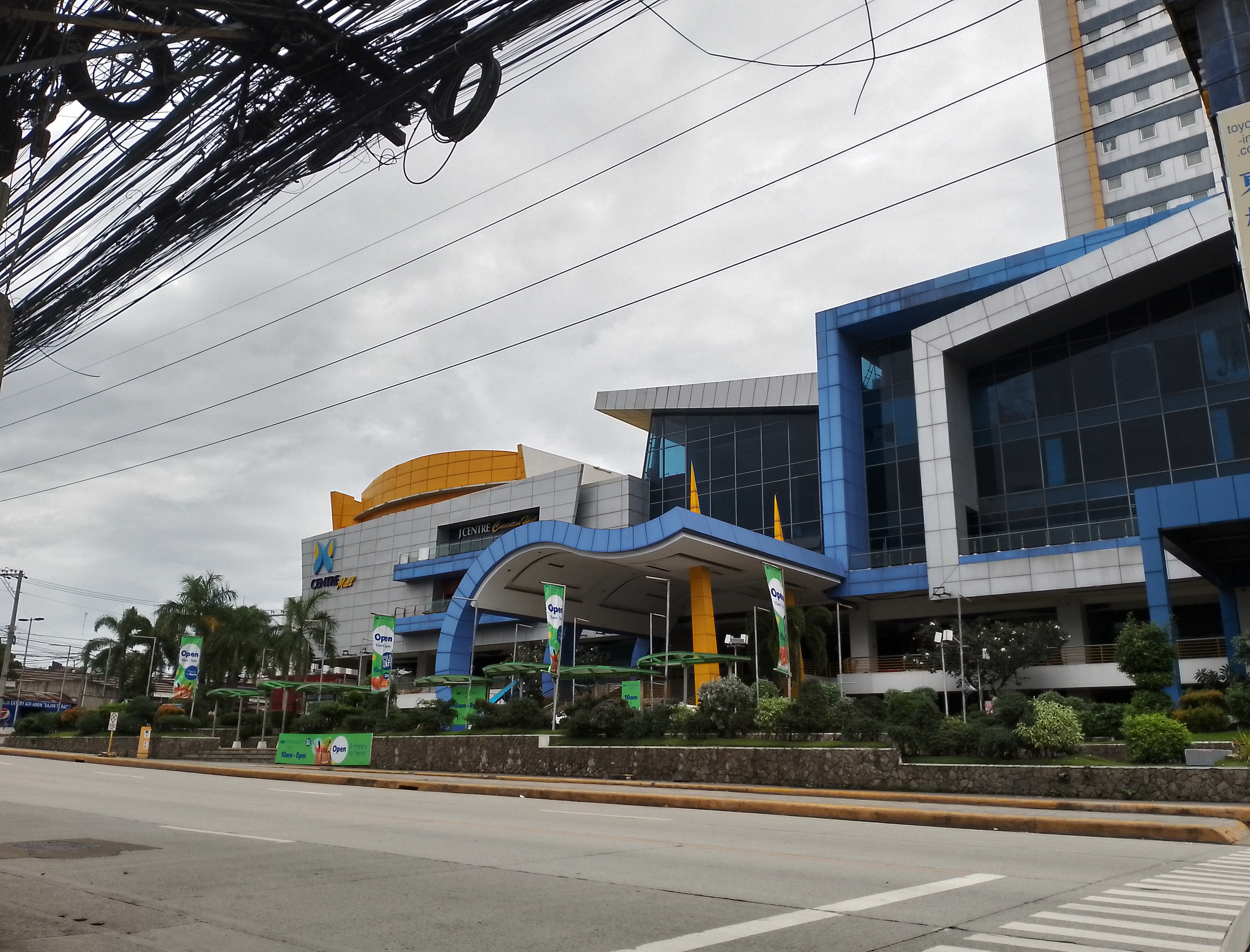
J Centre Mall in 2023, after its closure

The mall was first opened as J Centre Mall, and was owned and operated by EverJust Realty Development Corporation, a diversified local corporation based in Cebu. The mall had its first opening on September 30, 2011, with its anchor tenant SM Hypermarket, along with Watsons and other smaller stores, began operations. Full operations were reported to set to commence by November 2011.

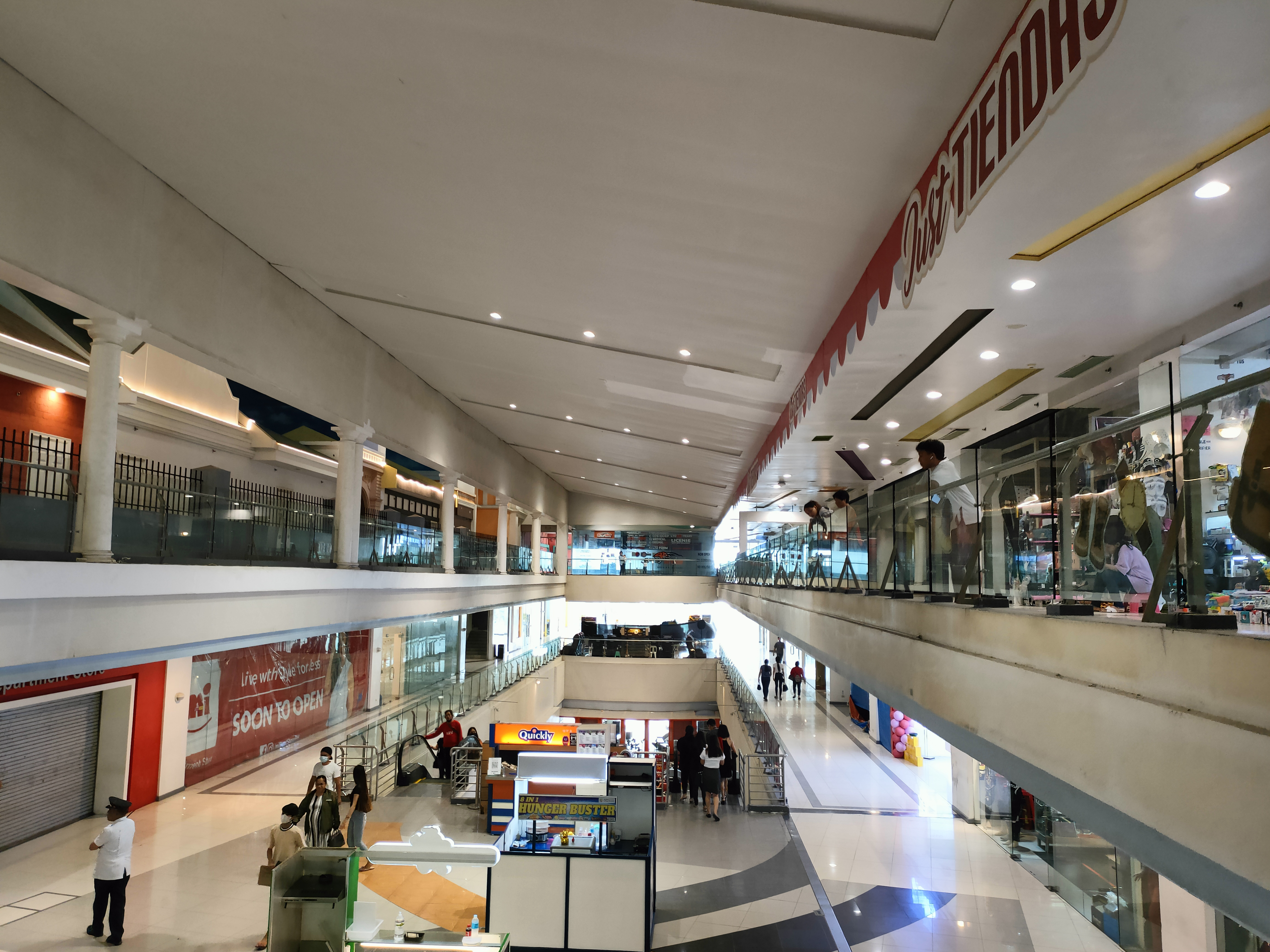
J Centre Mall's interior in early 2023 briefly before its closure

On October 29, 2022, J Centre Mall's management sent out a notice of pre-termination of lease contract to its tenants and indicating its closure on January 31, 2023. The mall's closure was attributed to difficulties stemming from the COVID-19 pandemic in the Philippines, where many brick-and-mortar stores faced stiff competition from online retailers due to pandemic-related restrictions.

Following the precedent set in other malls acquired by SM, which integrated their old names into their new ones, the mall was formally renamed SM J Mall, making it the third SM Supermall to do so after SM Megacenter Cabanatuan in Cabanatuan City, and SM City Mindpro in Zamboanga City.

== Features ==
SM J Mall is a 138,000 m^{2} (1,490,000 sq ft), four-level mall that offers a mix of global and local brands among its tenants. SM J Mall is billed to feature a blend of modern and "Japan-inspired" elements in its architecture.

=== Izakaya Terrace ===
The mall includes the Izakaya terrace, which features mostly Japanese restaurants for authentic Japanese inspired dining experiences, with a row of casual dining options and al fresco options.

=== Food Hall ===
The mall includes an Asian-inspired Food Hall, and is the first SM Supermall in Cebu to feature the Food Hall.

=== Cinemas ===
The mall features four cinemas, including two Director's Club cinemas, which are equipped with 100 recliner seats, laser cinema projection, and Dolby Atmos sound systems.

== Incidents ==
=== 2019 J Centre Mall heist ===
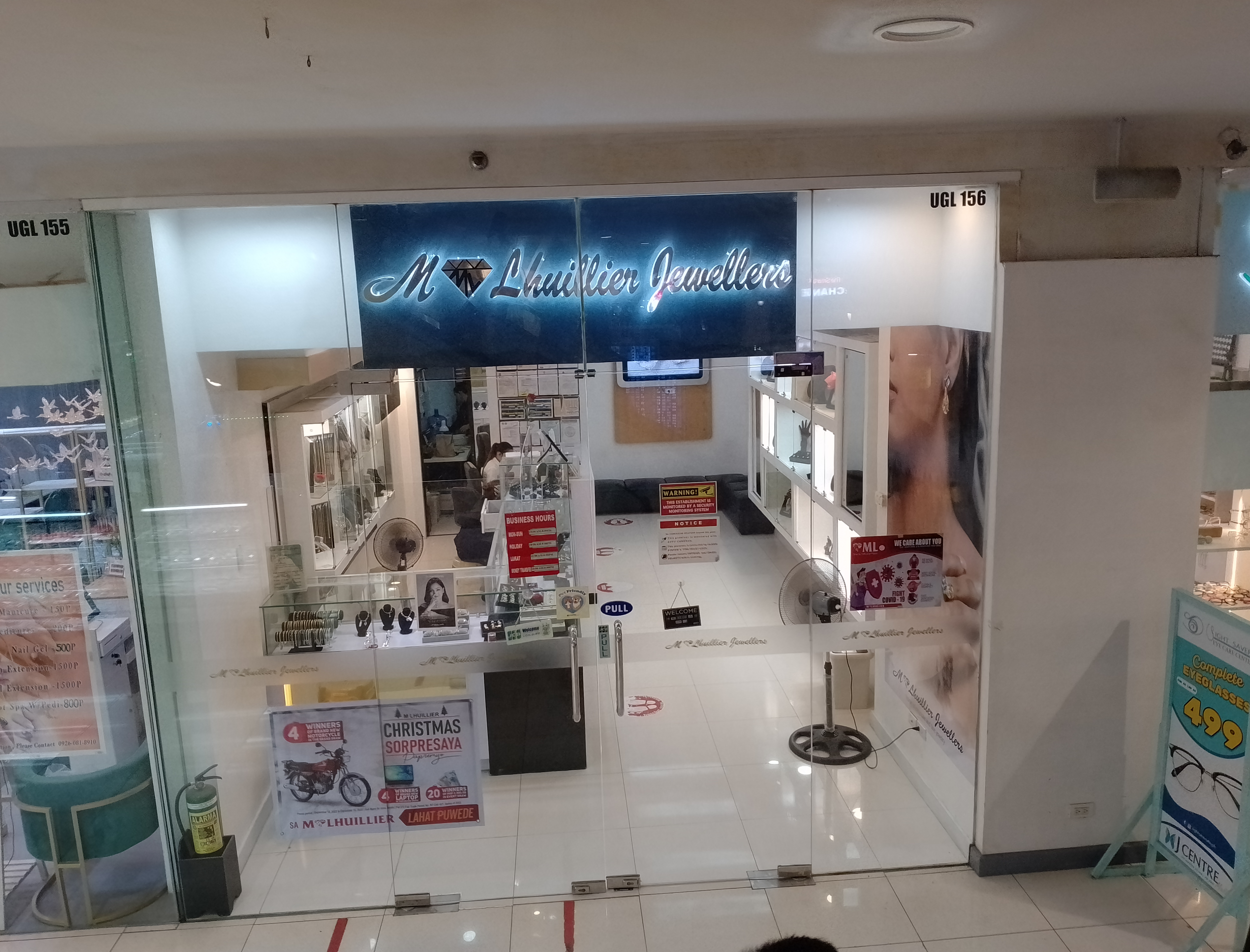
M Lhuillier Jewelry (the site of the heist), pictured in 2022

On October 19, 2019, at around 8 PM PST, a group of armed individuals stormed the mall, then still known as J Centre Mall, robbing four pawnshops and a money exchange. Local authorities estimate the suspects took off with ₱130 million worth of jewelry and ₱6 million in cash.

== Gallery ==
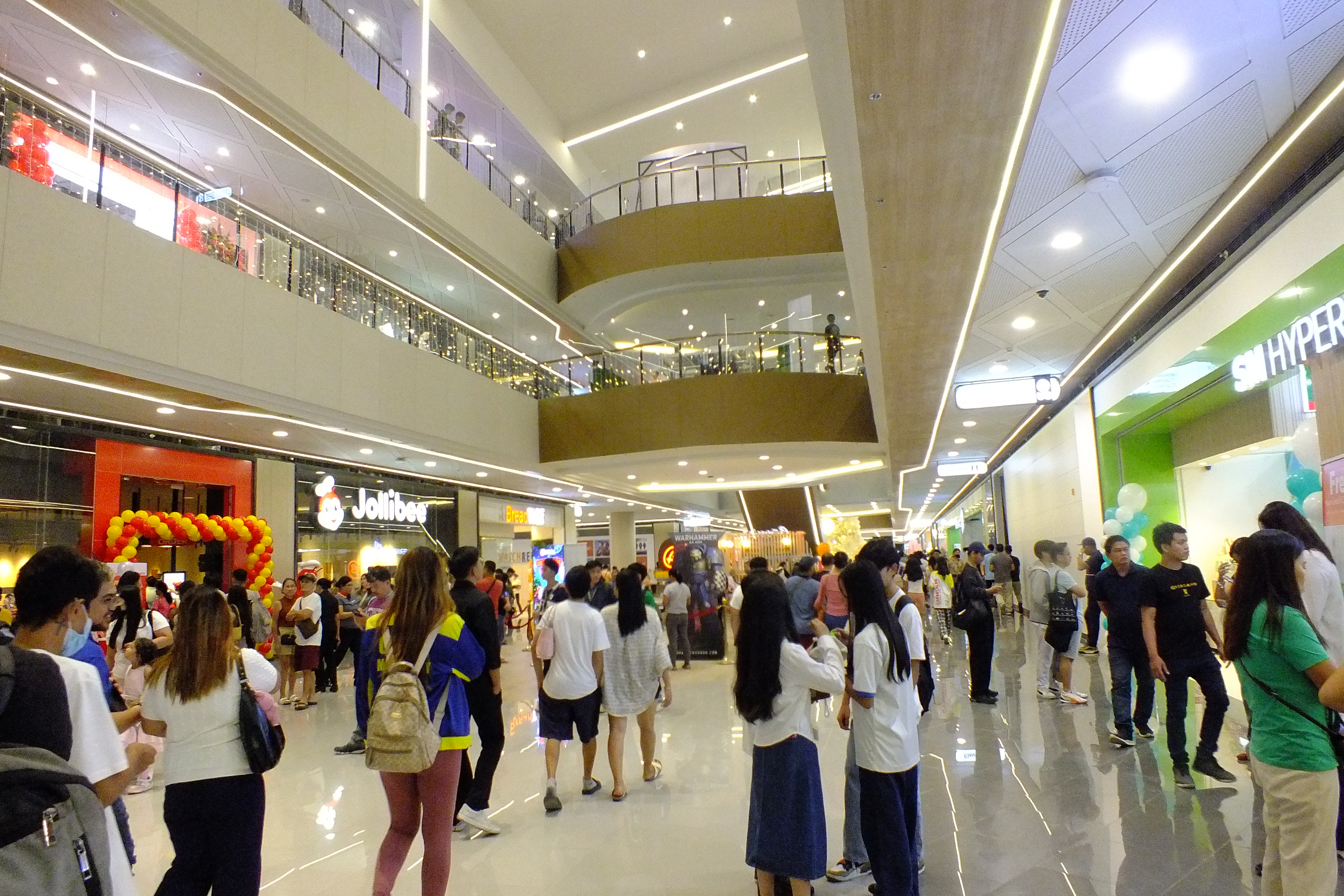
Upper ground

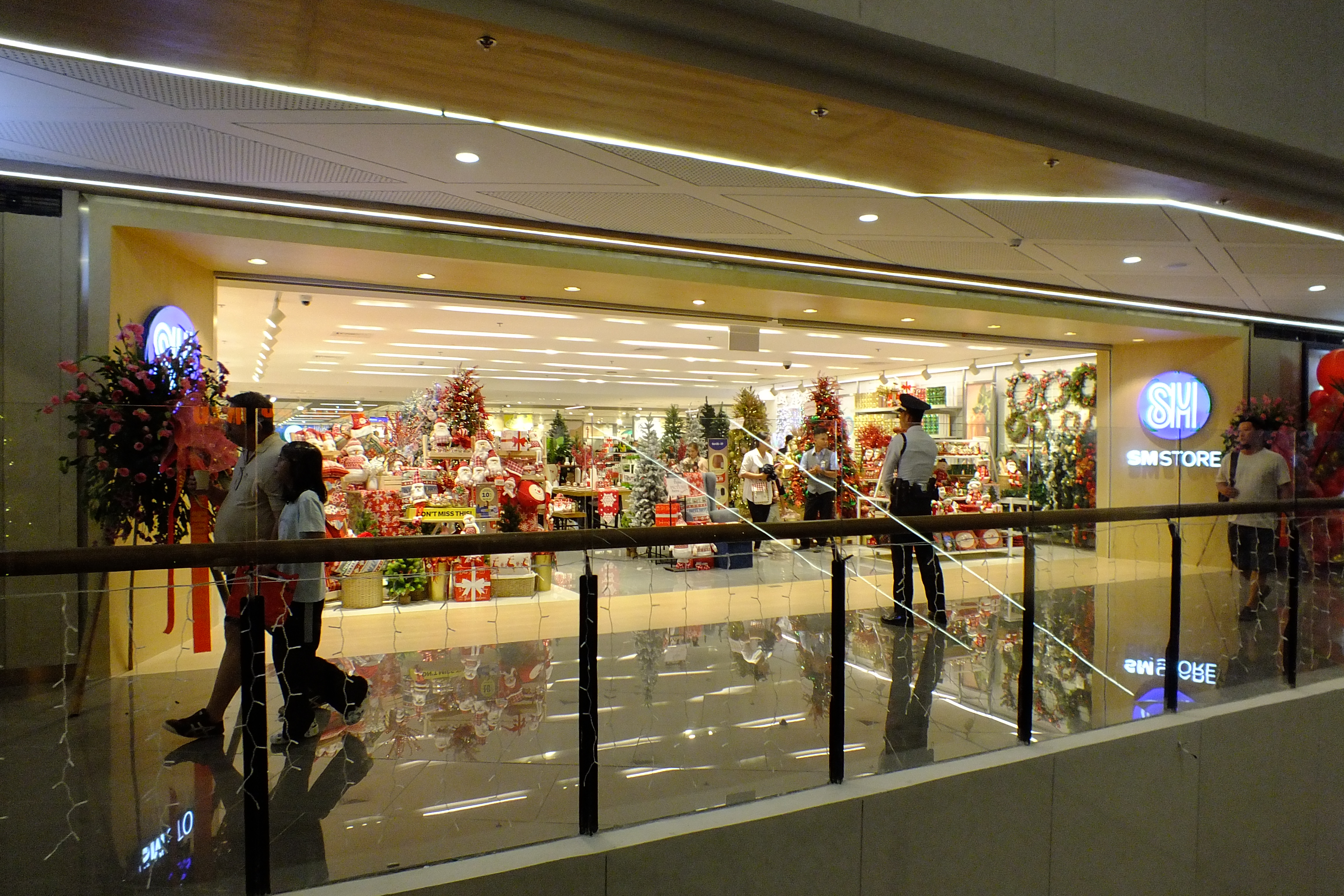
SM Store

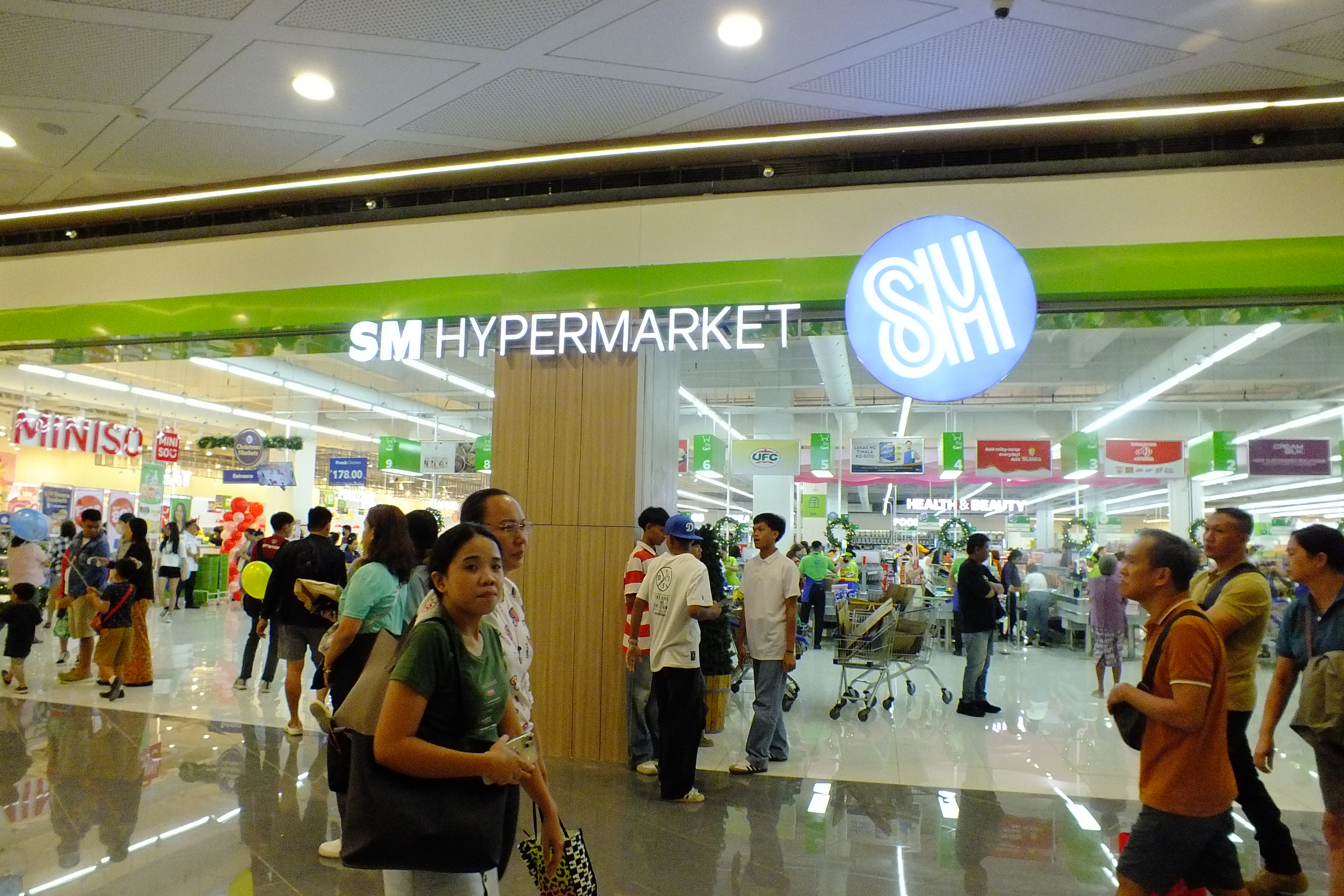
SM Hypermarket

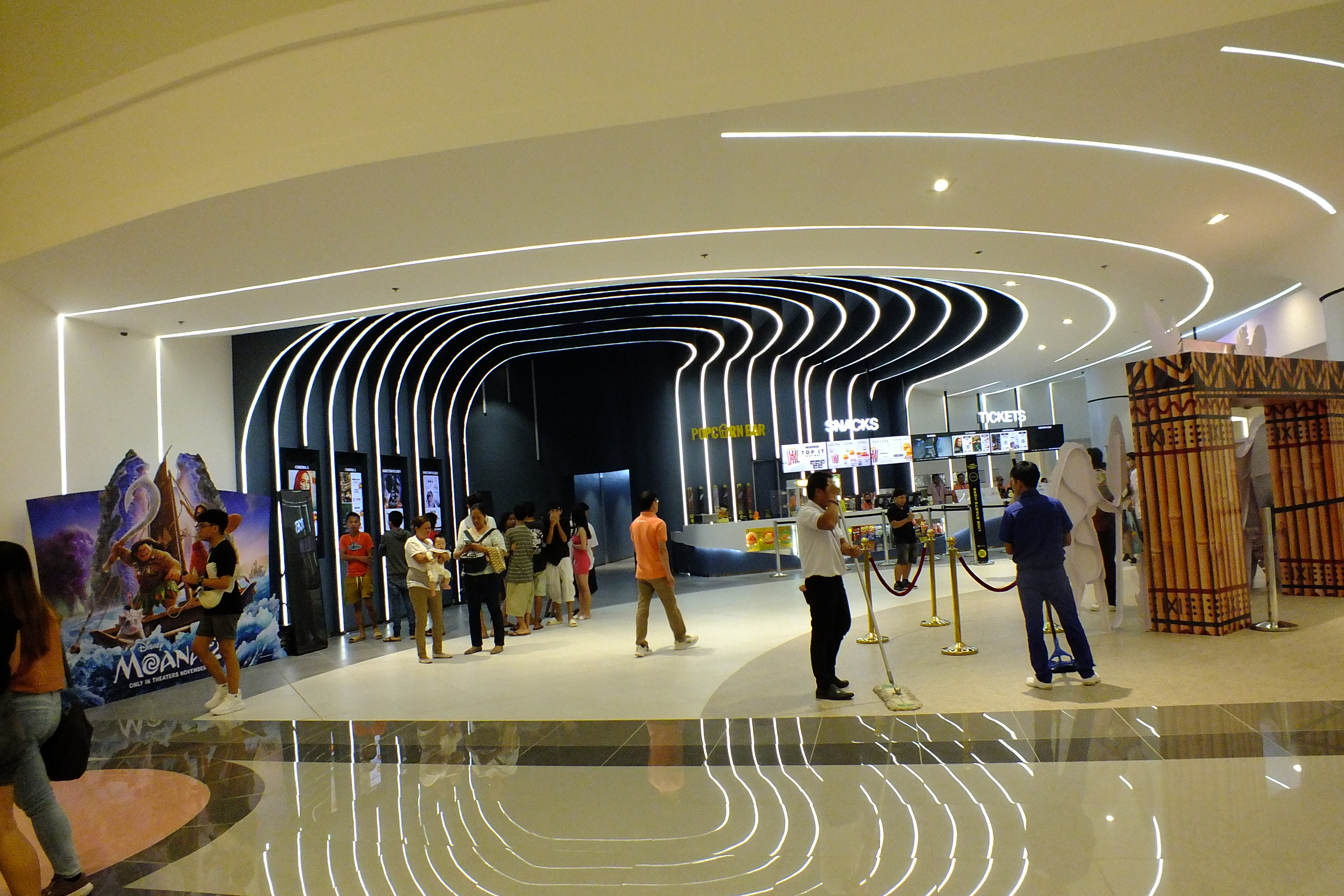
Cinema

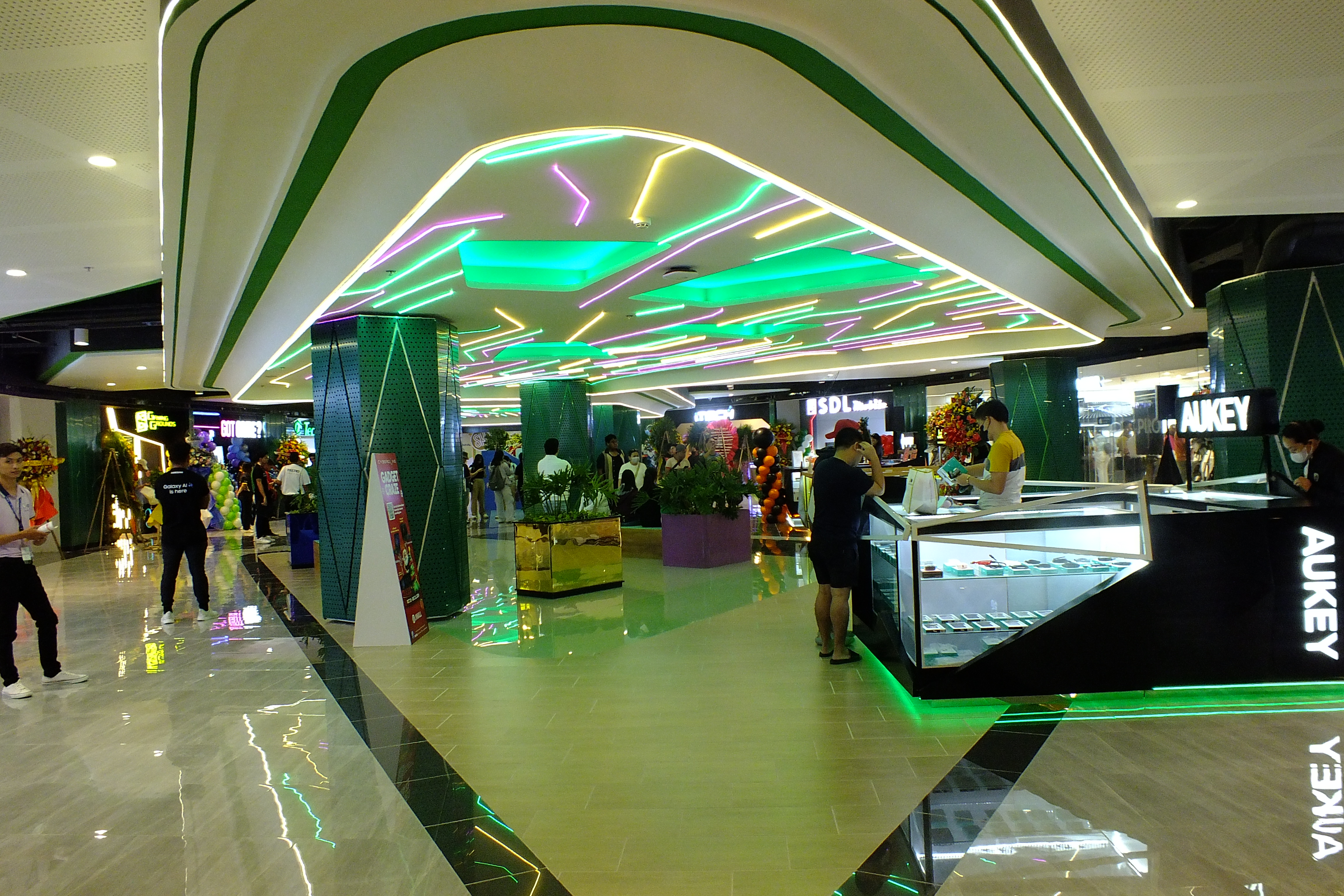
SM Cyberzone

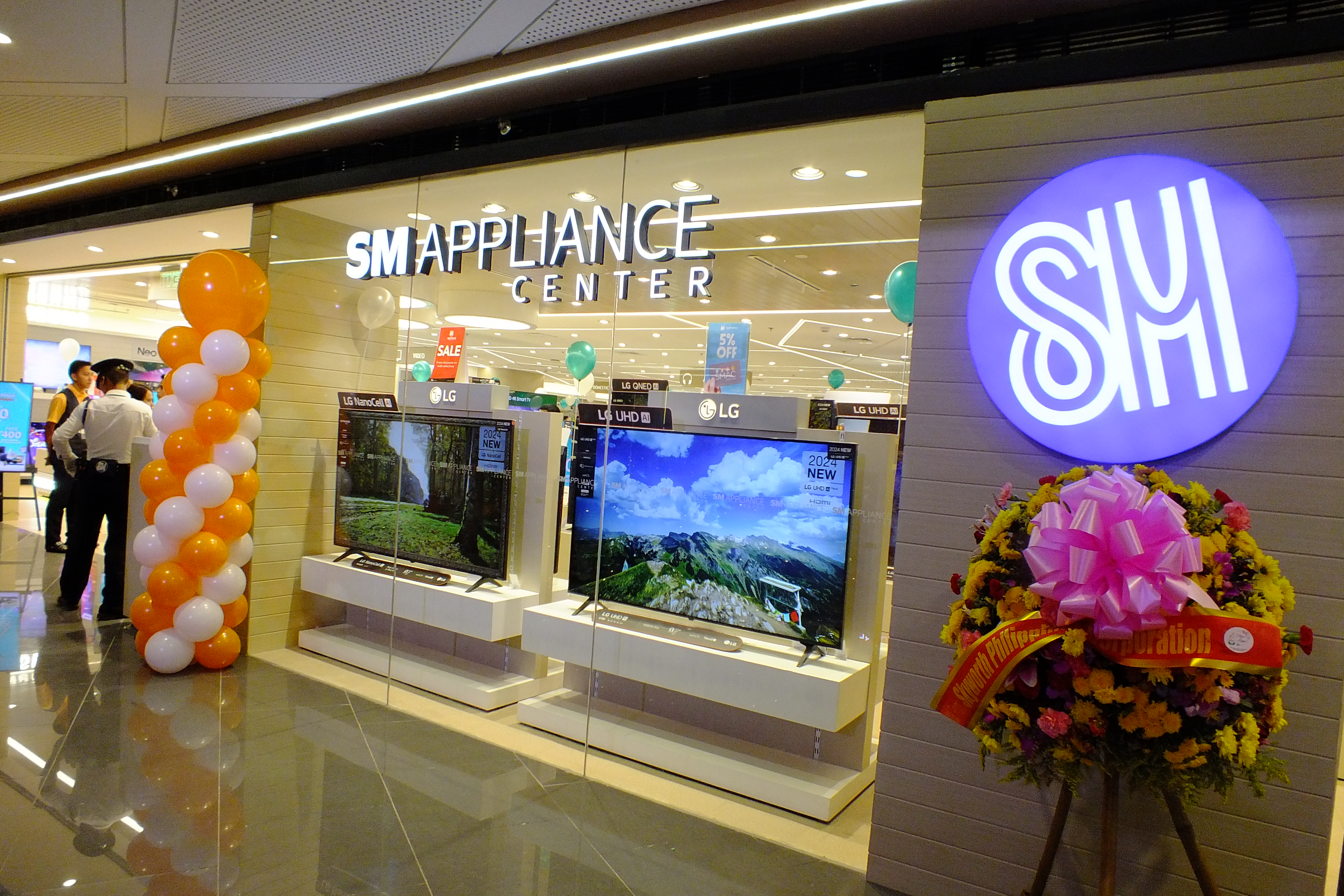
SM Appliance Center

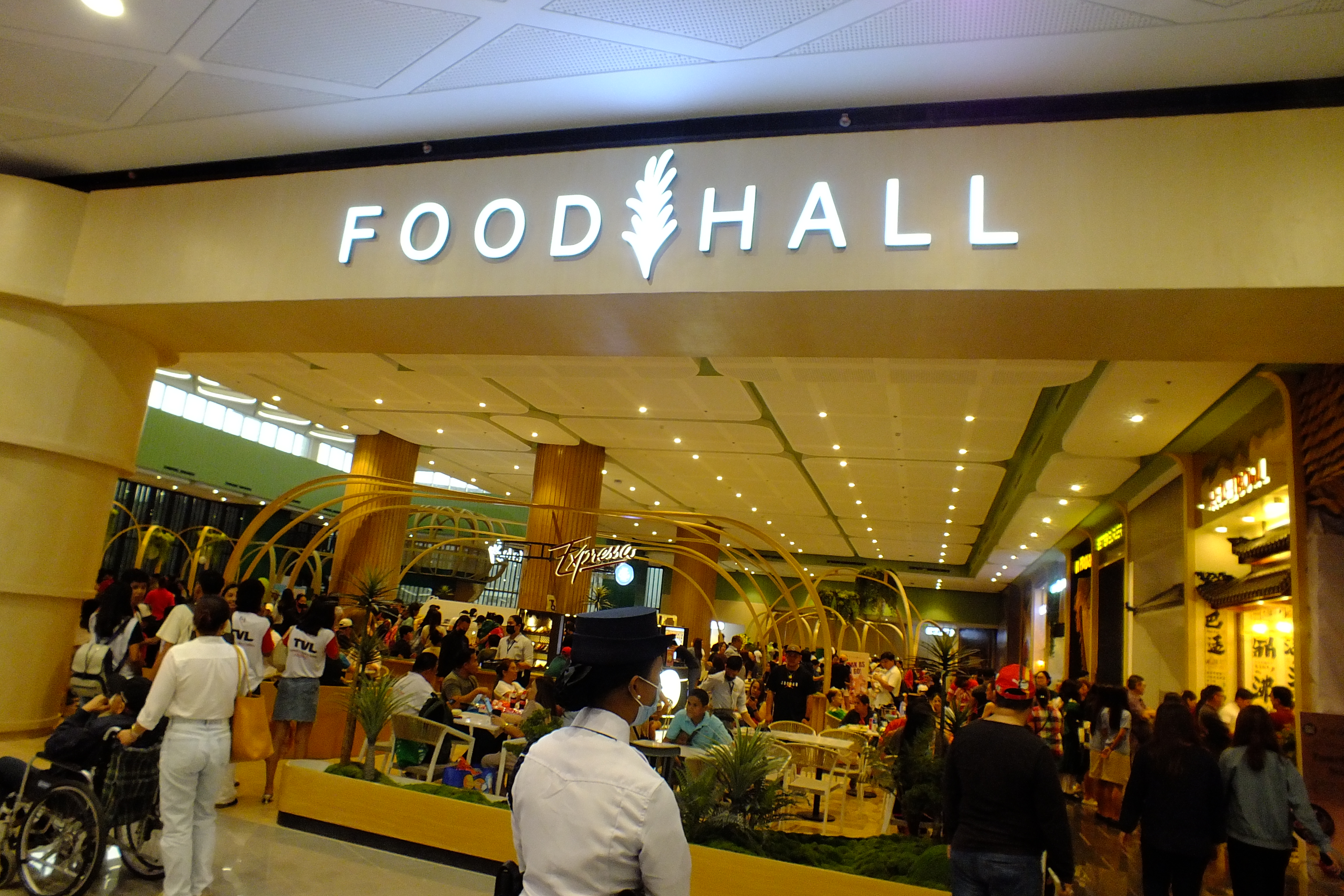
Food Hall

== See also ==
- SM City Cebu
- SM Seaside City
- Ayala Center Cebu
- Ayala Malls Central Bloc
- Robinsons Galleria Cebu
- The Mall at Nustar
- Gaisano Mall of Cebu
- Parkmall

Preceded by SM City Caloocan	87th SM Supermall; 2024	Succeeded by SM City Laoag
