= Ayala Malls Central Bloc =

Shopping mall in the Philippines

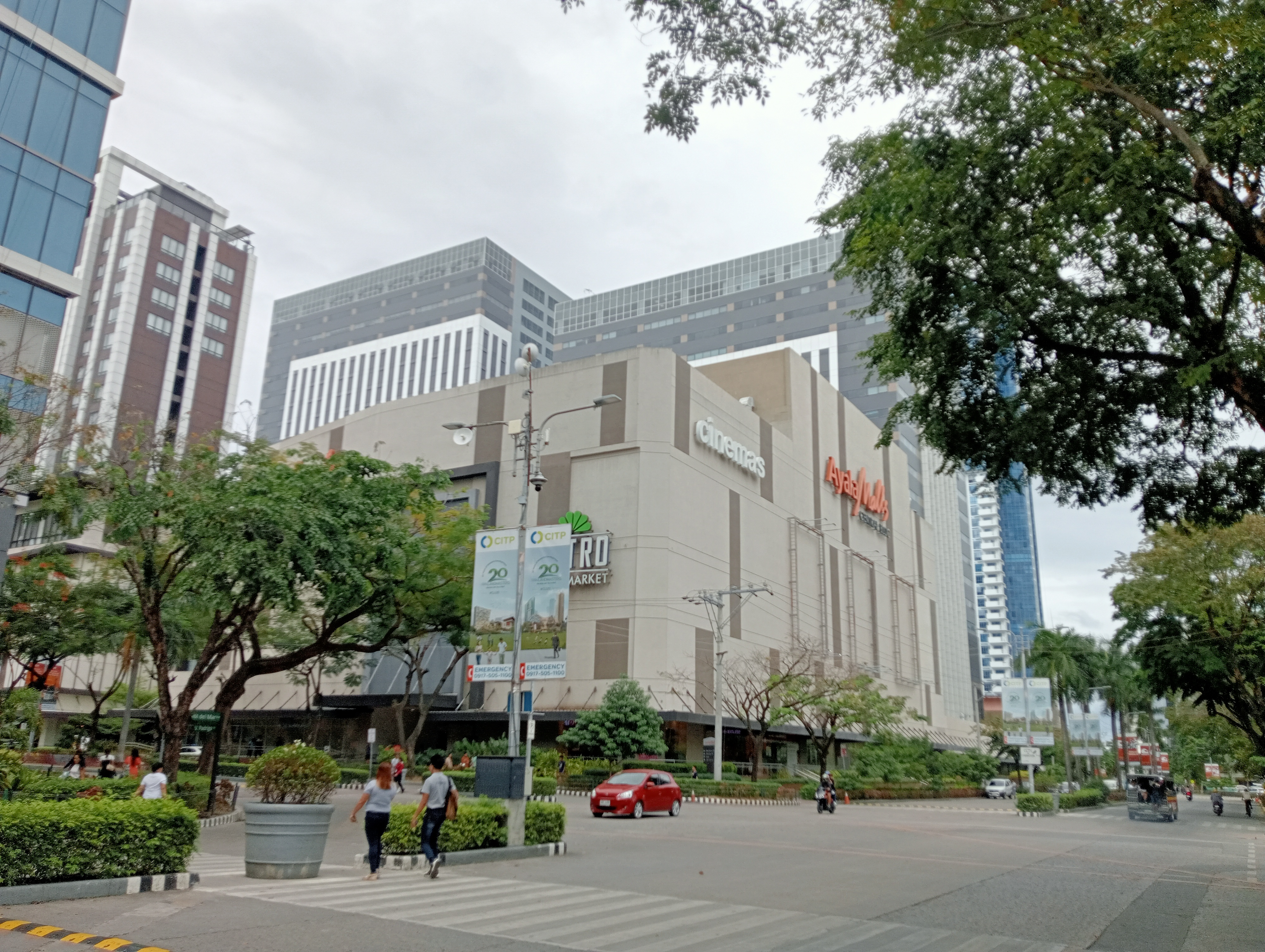
- The mall in 2024
- Location: Cebu City
- Coordinates: 10°19′50″N 123°54′26″E
- Address: V. Padriga cor. I. Villa and W. Geonzon Streets, Cebu IT Park, Brgy. Apas, Cebu City
- Opened: December 6, 2019; 6 years ago
- Developer: Cebu Holdings Inc.
- Manager: Ayala Corporation
- Owner: Ayala Corporation
- Num. of stores: 300
- Floor area: 45,000 square metres (480,000 sq ft)
- Floors: 5
- Public transit: 17B 17C 17D Apas; 42E Talisay via Labangon; 46 Carcar; Centro, Mandaue–IT Park; Cebu City Hall–IT Park; Consolacion–IT Park; Cordova–IT Park; Liloan–IT Park; Marigondon–IT Park; MEPZ 2–IT Park; Minglanilla–IT Park; Naga–IT Park; Parkmall–IT Park; Tabunok–IT Park; Talisay–IT Park via South Road; C Ayala Center Cebu, SM Seaside, Il Corso; ST CT Mactan Newtown; MB Mactan–Cebu International Airport; CT Danao; T TOPS, Busay

Ayala Malls Central Bloc (or simply Central Bloc by the locals) is a large shopping mall in Cebu IT Park developed by Cebu Holdings Incorporated, becoming the second Ayala Mall in Cebu City, Philippines, in 25 years since the opening of Ayala Center Cebu and its fifth regional mall in Visayas and Mindanao. It has a gross leasable area (GLA) of 45,000 square meters. The mall opened on December 6, 2019.

== History ==
On March 20, 2015, Ayala Land broke ground at its Central Bloc project, a 2.2-hectare (5.4-acre) project within Cebu IT Park. One of its components is the Ayala Malls Central Bloc which can cater up to 500 stores.

It has five levels of retail development, four digital cinemas, an indoor activity center, a fashion gallery, a food court, a basement supermarket, and a three-level basement parking. The mall was expected to open by October 2019 but was moved to December 6, 2019.

According to Ayala Malls VisMin head Clavel Tongco, the mall operates from 11:00 A.M. until 11:00 P.M. with people working in the business process outsourcing (BPO) industry as its main target market. But this has changed to 10:00 A.M. until 10:00 P.M., the only mall outside Metro Manila to have such a schedule daily.

== Incidents ==
=== Christmas tree fire ===
On December 26, 2019, just 20 days after its official opening, the mall's outdoor Christmas tree caught fire but was promptly extinguished by its emergency quick response team. It was likely to be caused by faulty wiring according to the Bureau of Fire Protection due to it being exposed in the rain.

== Gallery ==
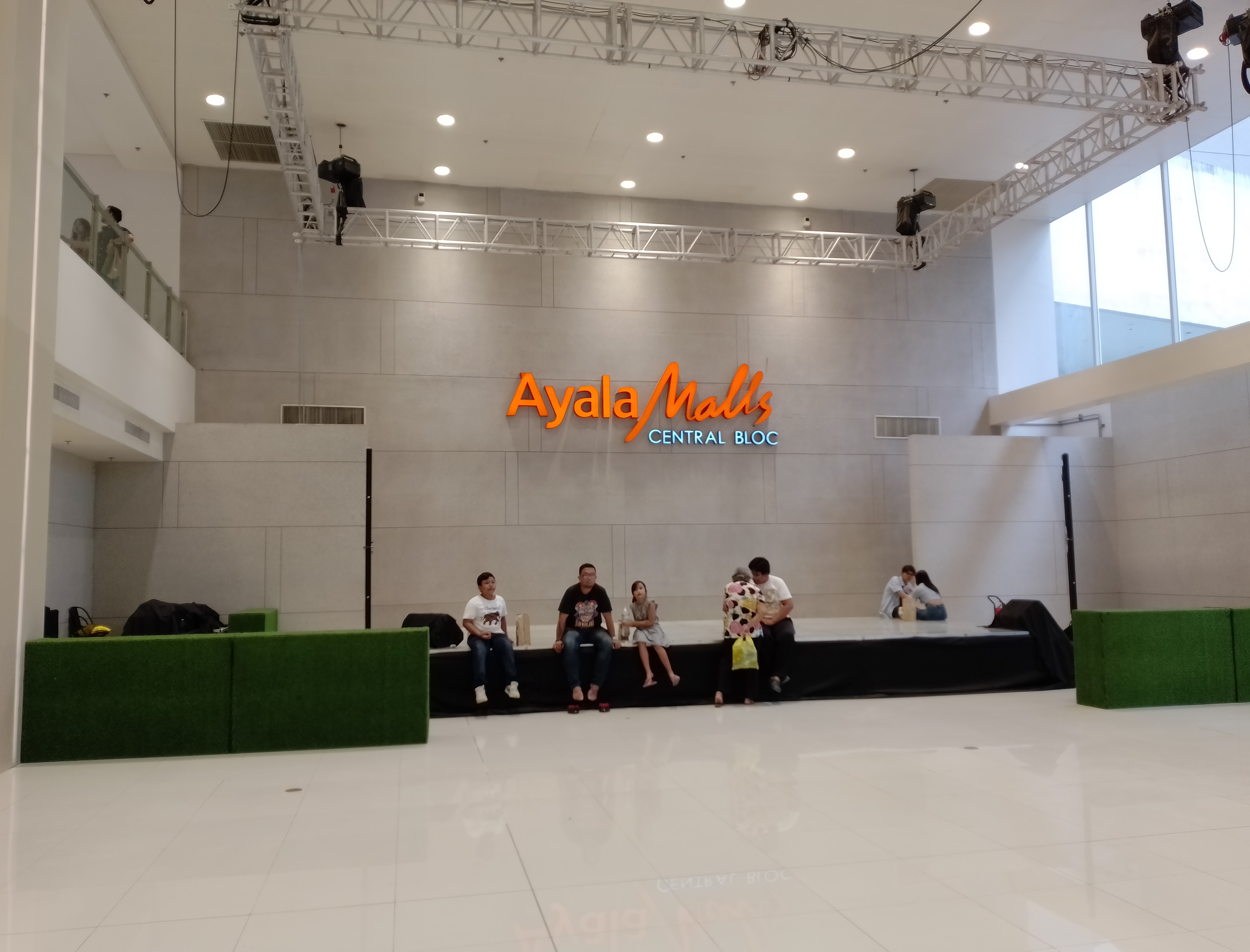
Activity center

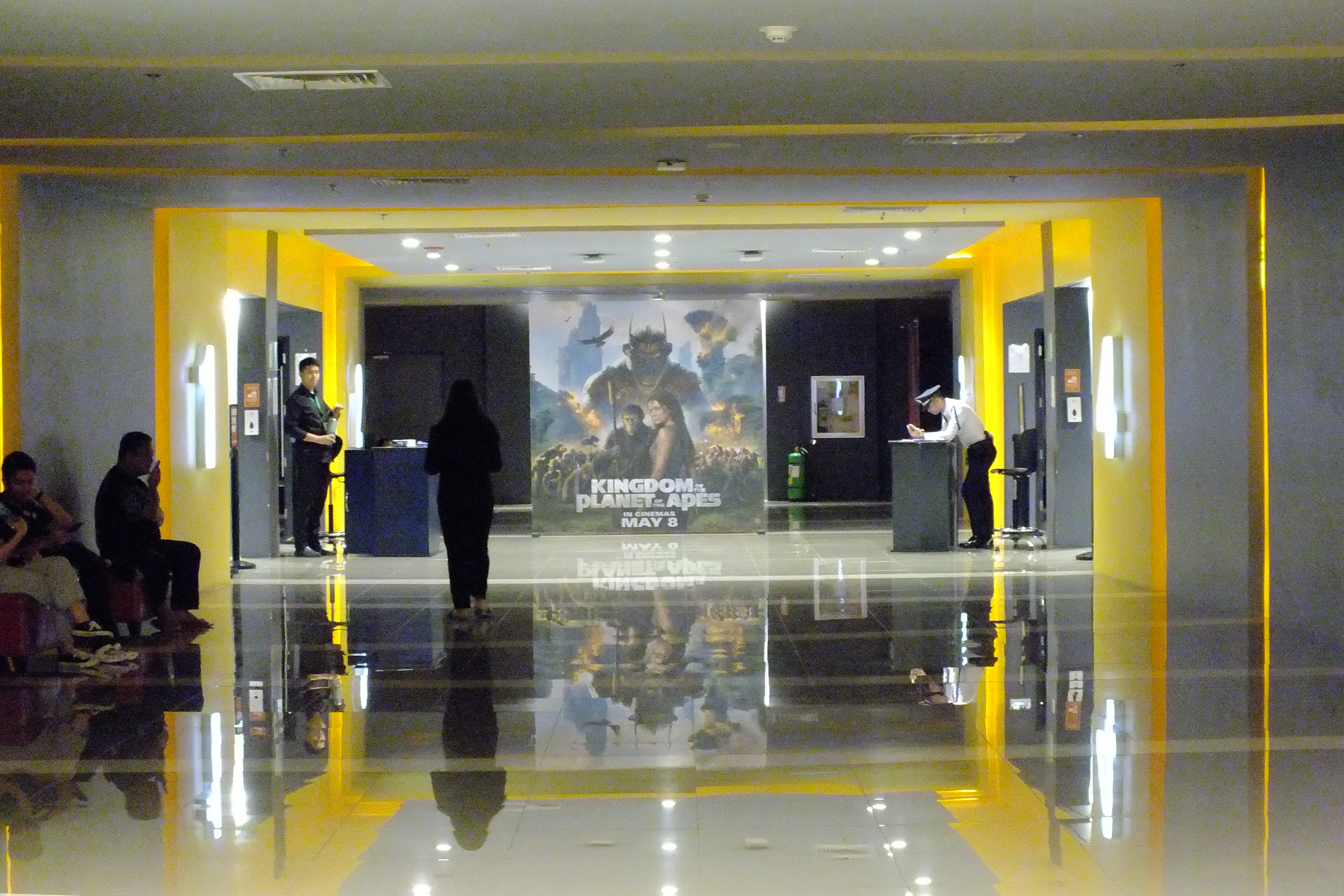
Cinema

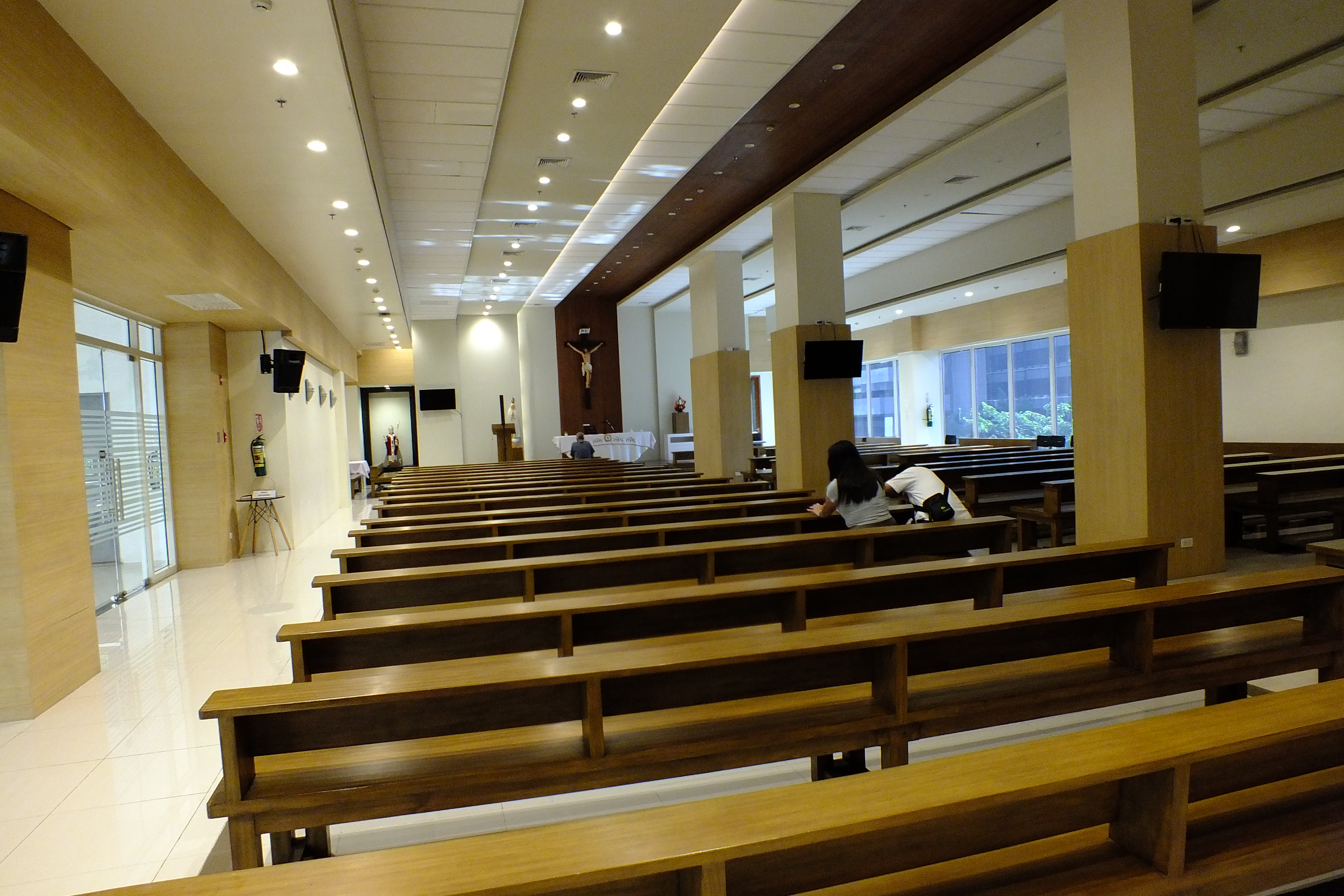
Chapel of St. John Paul II

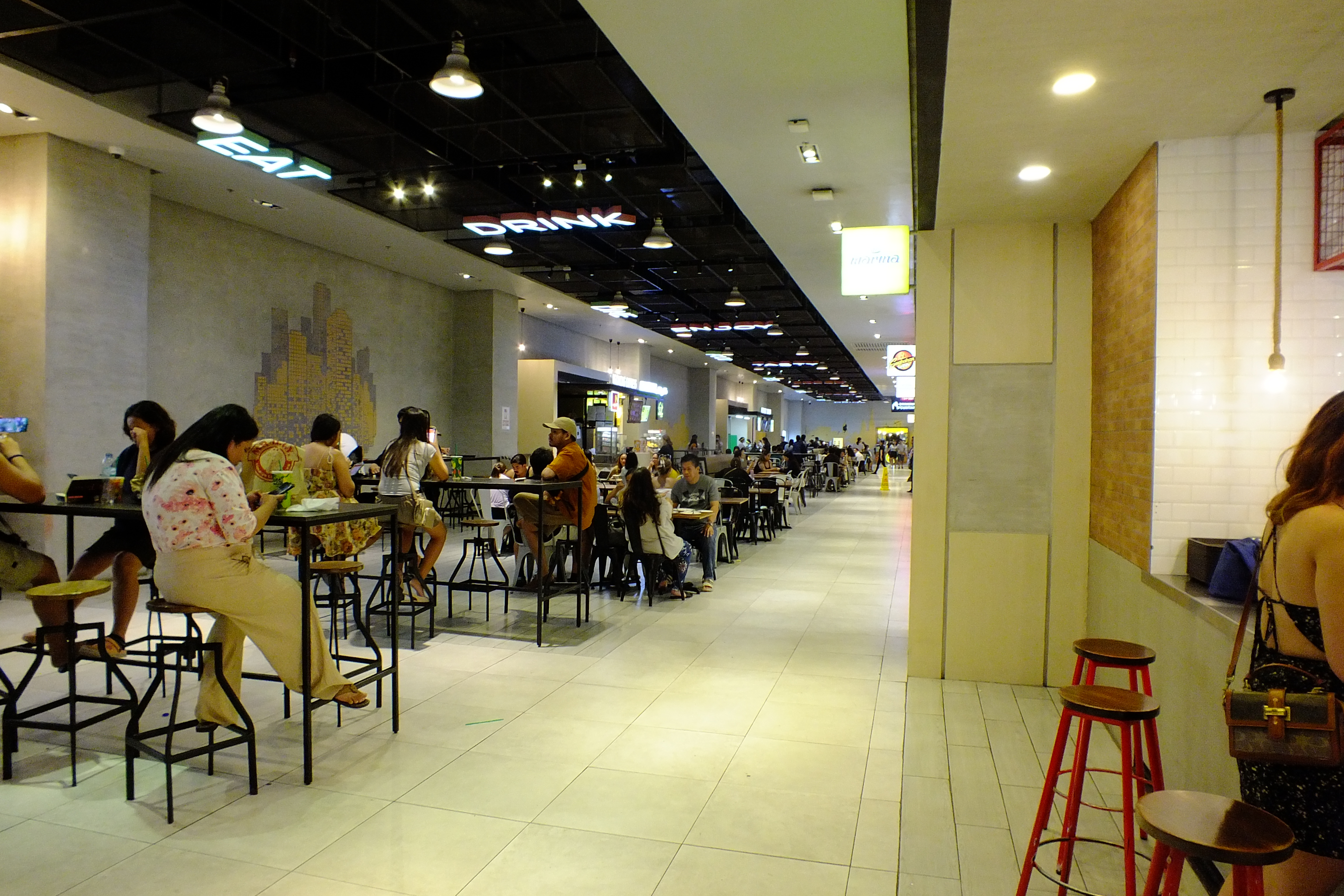
Food choices

Damage to the mall from Typhoon Rai in 2021

== See also ==
- Ayala Center Cebu
- SM City Cebu
- SM Seaside City
- SM J Mall
- Robinsons Galleria Cebu
