= Manok ni San Pedro =

- Created by: International Pharmaceuticals Incorporated
- Based on: "Manok ni San Pedro" by Max Surban
- Developed by: ABC Development Corporation
- Written by: Marcos Navarro Sacol; Mary Jane Lawas; Gale Camus
- Directed by: Marcos Navarro Sacol
- Ending theme: "Manok ni San Pedro" by Max Surban
- Country of origin: Philippines
- Original language: Cebuano

Production
- Executive producer: Angel "Tito" dela Merced
- Producer: International Pharmaceuticals Incorporated
- Editor: Henrie Thuba Marquez
- Running time: 30 minutes

Original release
- Network: TV5 Cebu
- Release: April 13, 2013 – May 5, 2014

Manok ni San Pedro (transl. St. Peter's Chicken) is a 2013 Cebuano drama series aired on TV5 Channel 21 Cebu.

Originately, a drama show aired on IBC 13 during the '70s. The drama was introduced during the network's mall show in Parkmall, Mandaue City on April 13, 2013, along with the network's other drama series such as Antigo and other network's programs.

== Cast ==
- Wilson Navarro as Esteban "Teban" Escudero
- Shelie Cabante as Liza
- Marvin Sinamban as Arnold
- George Aznar as Don Miguel - Liza's father
- Vic Romarate as Don Alfonso - Arnold's father
- Cathleen Melgar as Rosie - Liza's sister
- Pedro Pongase as Rocky - Arnold's sidekick
- Geraldine Roldan as Geraldin - Don Alfonso's helper
- Nolito Morales Dayanan as Atty. Ismokoy Bira
- Isagani Nadela Sacol as Gani Boy
- Lani Durano Alerta as Mayang - Teban's cousin
- Miguelito Yburan as Ekong - Teban's father
- Mary Jane Lawas as Rustica - Teban's former love interest
- Lino Giolen as Atty. Bartolome "Tommy" Imbaw - Ogis' security guard
- Norman Bastid as Tarok Mongisi
- Gale Camus as Gale
- Ananias Barongo Waskin as Dondon
- Rey Salon as Sente - Don Miguel's errand boy
- Jasmine Dominguez as Rosa Mia
- Ricky Labang as Opong
- McArthur Flor Jr. as Glen
- Mariele Montellano as Inday

== Production crew ==
- McArthur Flor Jr.
- Rey Salon
- Norman Bastida
- Jeffrey Salabande
- Nilo Camus

== See also ==
- TV5 Cebu
- Aso ni San Roque
