= Cebu IT Park =

Business park district in Cebu City, Philippines

- IT Capital of Cebu

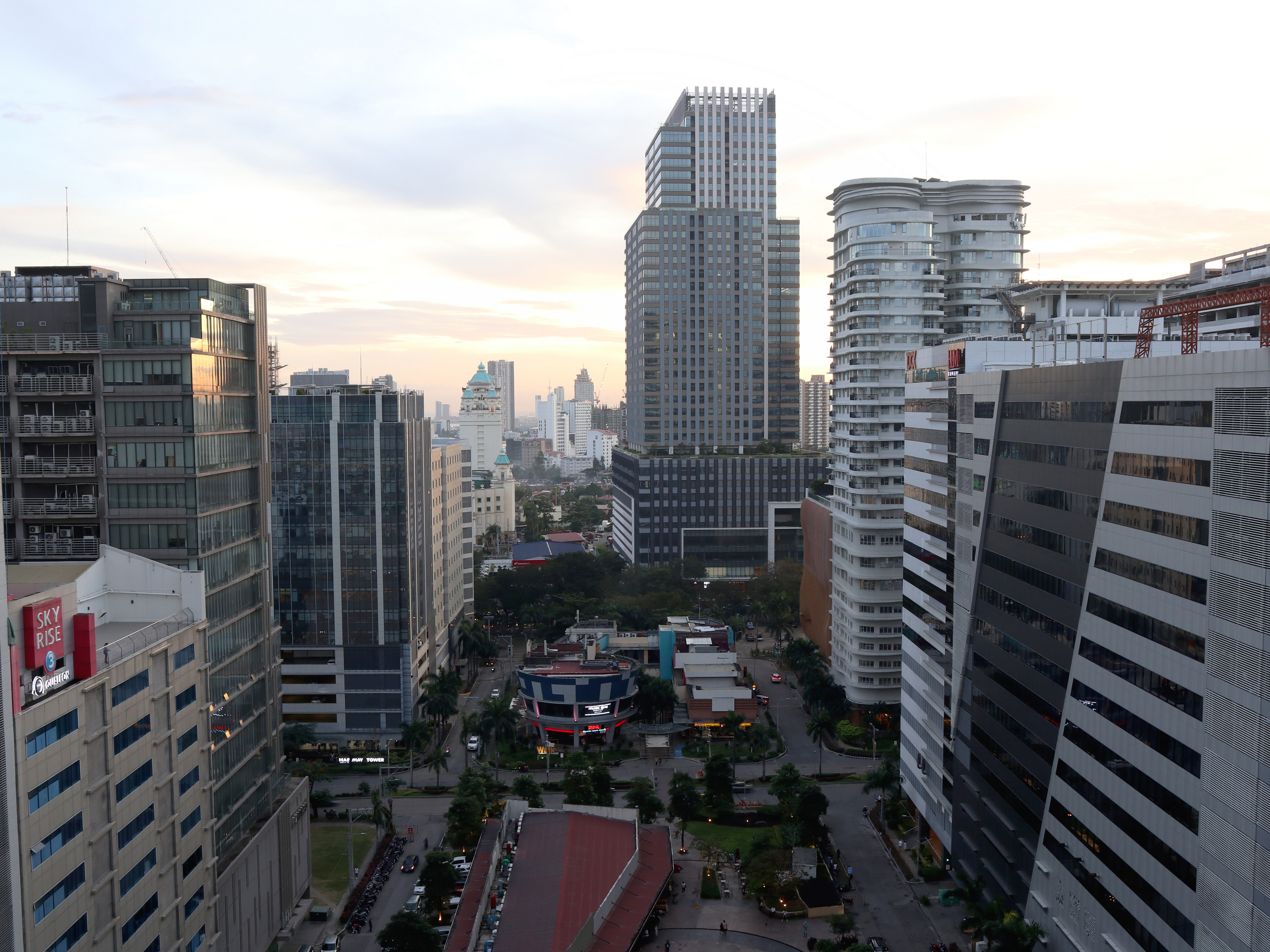
- Cebu IT Park top view Padrigas

Project
- Opening date: 2000
- Status: Complete
- Developer: Cebu Property Ventures and Development Corporation
- Operator: Cebu Holdings
- Owner: Cebu Holdings
- Website: cebuitpark.com

Physical features
- Transport: 04L Lahug - SM City Cebu (outside only; plying through Salinas Drive); 13C Talamban - Colon (outside only; plying through Gov. M. Cuenco Avenue); 17B 17C 17D Apas; 42E Talisay via Labangon; 62B 62C Pit-os - Colon (outside only; plying through Gov. M. Cuenco Avenue); SU Mactan Newtown; SU Cordova; SU MEZ 2 Estate; Star8 Marigondon; Consolacion - IT Park; Liloan - IT Park; Minglanilla - IT Park; Naga - IT Park; Tabunok - IT Park; C SM Seaside - IT Park; CT ST Mactan Newtown - IT Park

Location
- Interactive map of Cebu IT Park
- Coordinates: 10.3304°N 123.9074°E
- Country: Philippines
- Province: Central Visayas
- Municipality: Cebu City

Area
  - Land: 27 ha (67 acres)

The Cebu IT Park (formerly known as Asiatown IT Park) is a 27-hectare (67-acre) business park in Cebu City, Philippines. The park is envisioned to attract locators in the information technology industry. It is developed by Cebu Property Ventures and Development Corporation, a subsidiary of Cebu Holdings, Inc., in turn a wholly owned subsidiary of Ayala Land.

== History ==
The site of where the Cebu IT Park is on used to be the site of the old Lahug Airport, which opened in 1938 before suspending operations in 1966, when Cebu's airport was transferred to the island of Mactan. One event of historical note occurred on February 19, 1981, when Pope John Paul held an open-air Papal Mass on the airport's runway.

The airport was finally closed in 1989, after it was acquired by Cebu Property Ventures, Inc., a subsidiary of Philippine property developer Ayala Land, just a couple of years after the same developer acquired the nearby Club Filipino golf course (which would later become the site of the Cebu Business Park). It was approved by the Philippine Economic Zone Authority (PEZA) board as an economic zone on April 6, 2000. On February 27, 2001, Presidential Proclamation No. 12 made it an Information Technology Special Economic Zone.

Construction on eOffice One, the first office modules in Cebu IT Park, began in 2001 and opened in 2002. It was later closed down and demolished to make way for Ayala Malls Central Bloc.

== Developments ==
=== General operations ===
Mid-rise office buildings in Cebu IT Park.

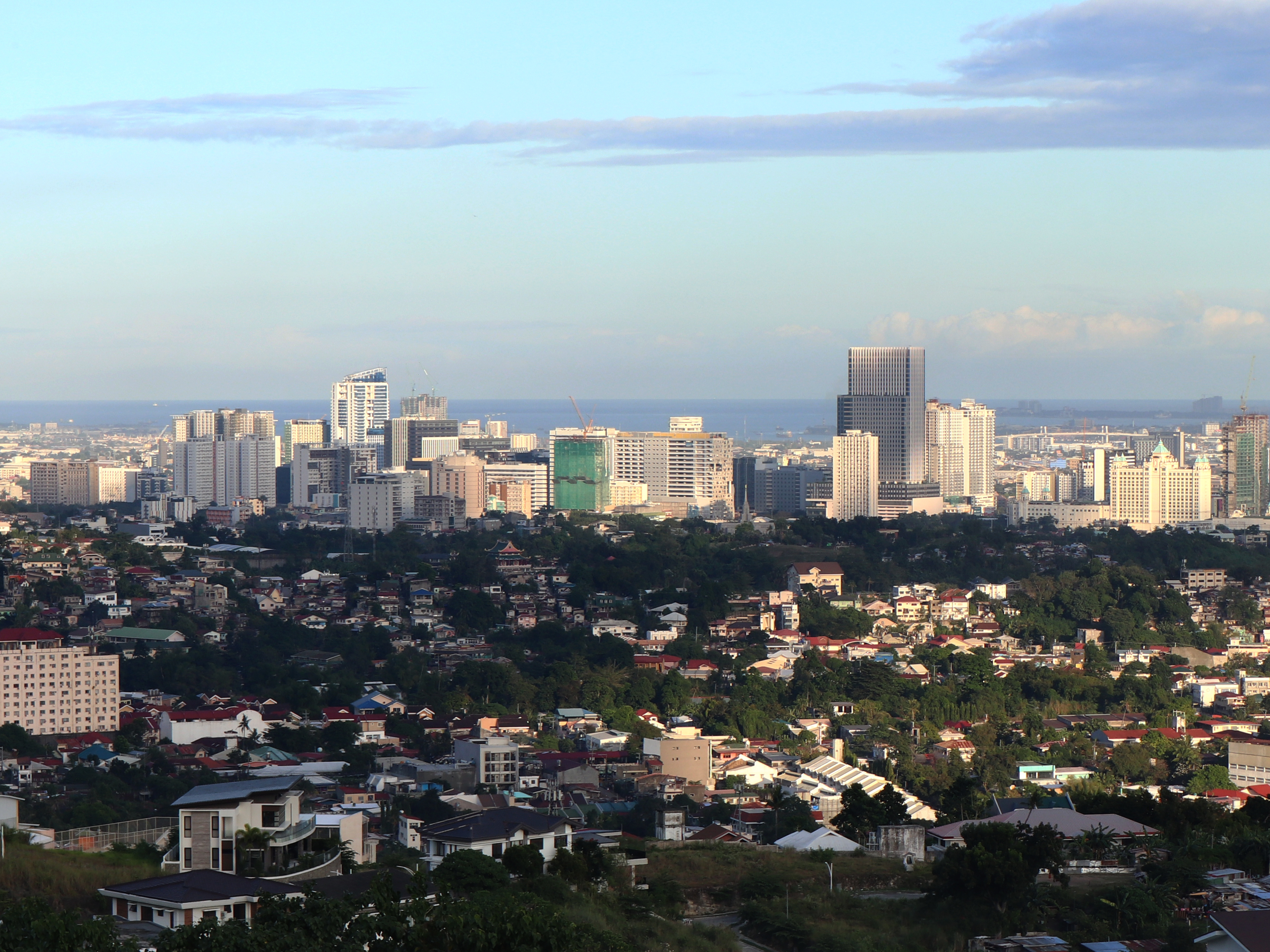
Skyline of Cebu IT Park as 2024.

Tenants in IT Park include Alstom, NEC, SPI Tech, 1&1 Internet Philippines, Inc., Teleperformance, Concentrix, Qualfon, Promotional USB, iQor, TOA Global, GoTeam, Accenture, NCR Voyix, IBM, Microsoft, Xlibris/Author Solutions, JP Morgan Chase, WorldRemit, Epson, 24-7 Intouch, Select VoiceCom, and Logix BPO. The main infrastructures found at the park are i1, i2, i3, The LINK, E-BLOC, E-BLOC 2, E-BLOC 3, E-BLOC 4, TGU Tower, Skyrise 4, Skyrise 3, Skyrise 2, Skyrise 1, CJRS Point, Mabuhay Tower, Calyx Centre, Globe Telecom IT Plaza, Teleperformance Tower, Avida Towers Cebu, Avida Towers Riala, Park Centrale, Asia Premier Residences, HM Tower, Filinvest Cyberzone Towers, and The Central Bloc.

In January 2010, IBM inaugurated its 2nd Global Delivery Center at TGU Tower. IBM established its initial presence in the Philippines in 1937. In 2007, IBM partnered with the Philippines Department of Science and Technology on the Philippine Intellectual Property Policy Strategy, Engineering Research & Development for Technology Program, and the National Technology Business Incubators Program. IBM Philippines Country General Manager James Velasquez said the company recognizes Cebu as the gateway both for its domestic clients in the Visayas and Mindanao, as well as overseas clients.

=== Ayala Malls Central Bloc ===
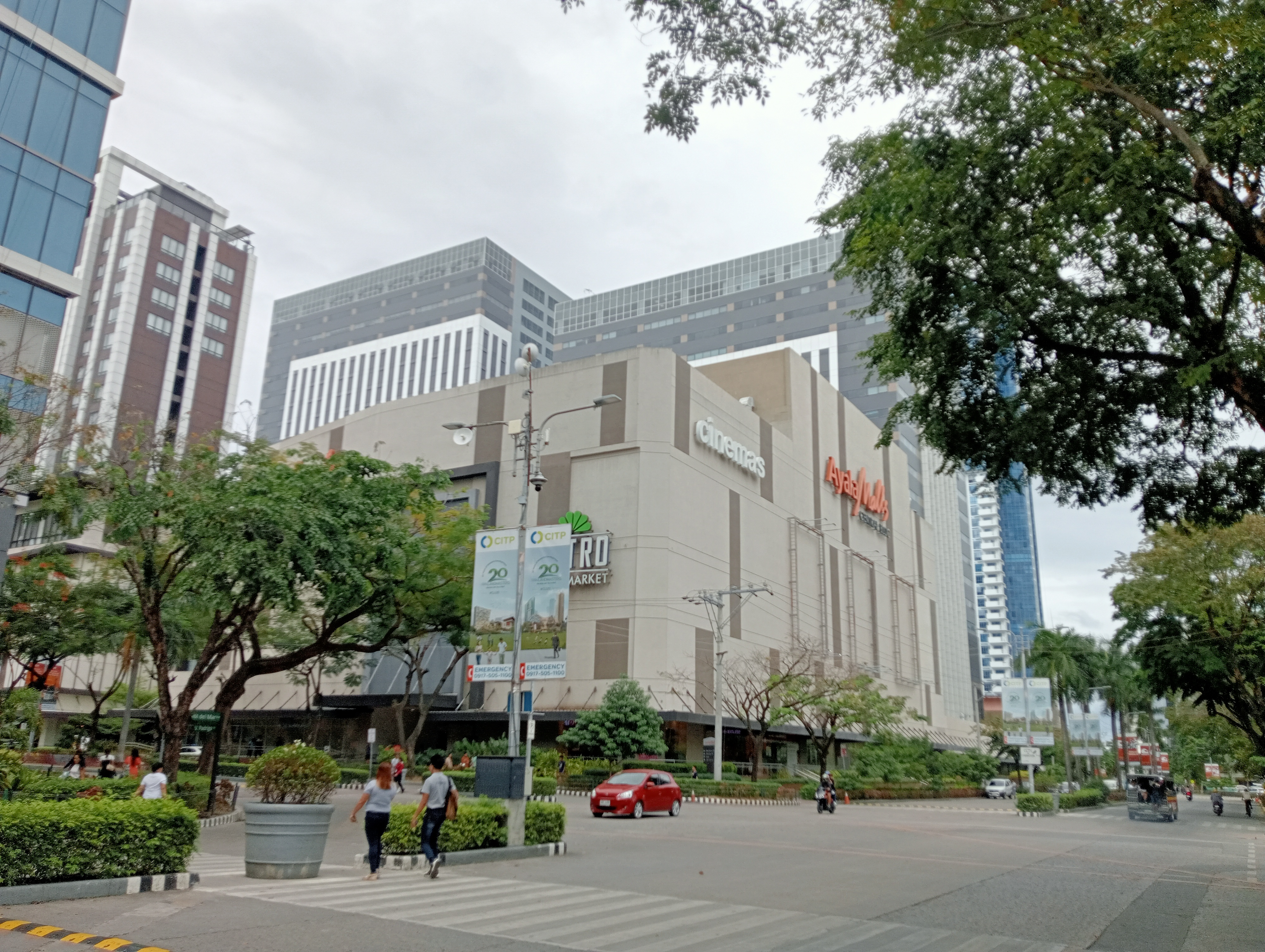
Ayala Malls Central Bloc

Opened on the site of eOffice One in 2019, Ayala Malls Central Bloc is the second Ayala Mall in Cebu and is the first major retail establishment within the property. Also located adjacent to the mall's complex is a Seda Hotel and two office buildings, with the whole Central Bloc complex serving as Ayala's mixed-use development centerpiece of the business park, similar to its larger neighbor Ayala Center Cebu, which is located in the center of the larger Cebu Business Park that is just nearby.

=== Garden Bloc ===
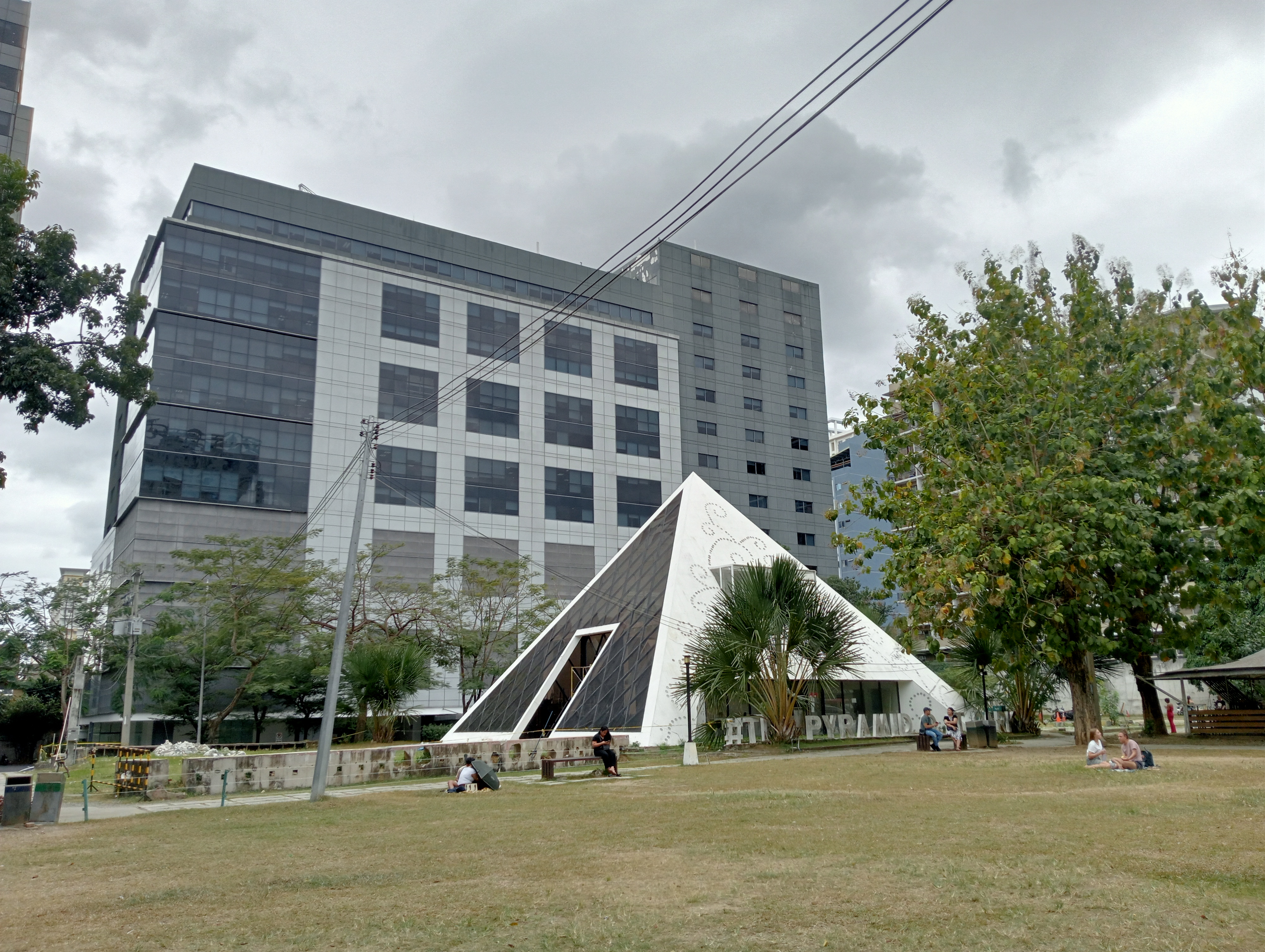
The Pyramid

Garden Bloc is a 3 hectares (7.4 acres) open park development within IT Park. It is also home to several restaurants and bars, such as Sugbo Mercado, and The Pyramid, among others. The Pyramid's physical structure still remains, but it has been closed since at least late 2023. Another former establishment, The Park Social, closed its doors on February 20, 2024, after its lease was not renewed. Additionally, a "Car-Free Sundays" initiative is held in the park, where designated streets are closed to vehicles from 5:00 am to 10:00 a.m. to encourage walking, jogging, and other outdoor activities.

=== Residential ===
Asia Premier Residences is the first residential condominium in IT Park, opening in 2011. Other residential condominiums within the development include 38 Park Avenue by Cebu Landmasters and several condominiums developed by Avida Land.

== See also ==
- Cebu Business Park
