= Gaisano Mall of Cebu =

Shopping mall in Cebu City, Philippines

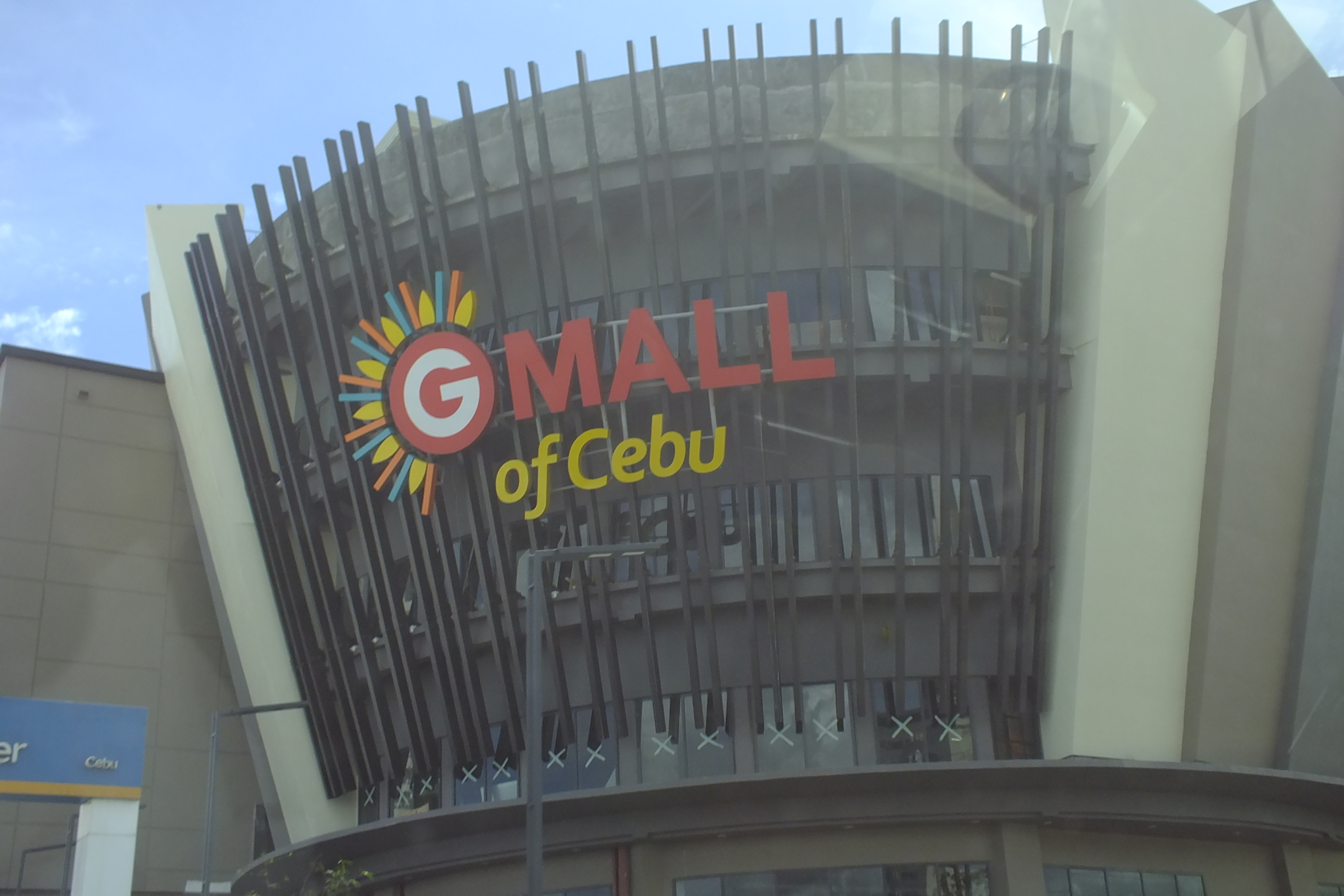
- Location: Cebu City
- Coordinates: 10.3086317°N 123.9118534°E
- Address: White Gold Center, A. Soriano Avenue, North Reclamation Area
- Opened: December 1, 2022; 3 years ago
- Developer: Gaisano Malls
- Owner: Gaisano Malls
- Num. of anchor tenants: 2
- Floor area: 200,000 square metres (2,200,000 sq ft)
- Floors: 6
- Public transit: 01K Urgello - Parkmall; 02B Pier; 10H 10M Bulacao, Pardo - SM City Cebu; 21A 21D 22A 22D Mandaue; 23A Pajo Terminal - Robinsons Galleria Cebu; 23D MEZ 2 Estate - Robinsons Galleria Cebu; 24 Consolacion - Robinsons Galleria Cebu; 25 Liloan - Robinsons Galleria Cebu; 26 Compostela; 27 Danao; 28 Carmen; Tabunok–Parkmall; Liloan–IT Park; Minglanilla–Parkmall; Naga–Parkmall

Gaisano Mall of Cebu (also known and branded as GMall of Cebu), is a super-regional mall in the Philippines, located at White Gold Center, North Reclamation Area, Cebu City, Philippines. The mall is owned and managed by Gaisano Malls, owned by DSG Sons Group, Inc. The mall is the group's first mall in Cebu and outside of Mindanao.

The mall opened on the site of the former White Gold Club, which was closed in 2018 to give way for the mall. After four years of redevelopment, the new GMall of Cebu opened on December 1, 2022.

== History ==
The mall traces its roots to the White Gold Department Store, established in 1933 by Modesta Singson-Gaisano and moved in 1946 along what is now known as Osmeña Boulevard in Cebu City. After the matriarch's death in 1981, the family's five sons (David, Stephen, Henry, Victor, and John) decided to go their separate ways, all establishing separate retail chains themselves. David, the eldest son, kept control of White Gold and established DSG Sons Group, Inc., which opened malls in Mindanao under the Gaisano Malls (GMall) brand. On May 18, 1994, WGI Gaisano Inc. (now known as DSG Sons Group, Inc.) was formed by merging two companies (White Gold Inc. and Gaisano Inc.) as a strategy to expand the company nationwide.

In 1974, their location on Juan Luna St. was engulfed in flames and permanently closed for a few years. Later in 1979, White Gold relocated and reopened in B. Benedicto St. cor. General Maxilom Ave. and G. Gaisano St. in Barangay Tejero, Cebu City. In 1989, a fire incident happened, but they were able to resume their business operations a few months later. Another fire incident in 1997 caused it to permanently close and abandon its location. In the same year, they relocated and reopened to a nearby location in A. Soriano St. in Cebu North Reclamation Area and relaunched as White Gold Club. It operated until 2018, when a redevelopment plan costing ₱1 billion was launched, and White Gold Club officially ceased operations on June 30, 2018. On December 10, 2022, ten days after the opening of GMall of Cebu, the old ruins of the White Gold Department Store in Barangay Tejero collapsed around 4:20 pm; there were no casualties reported.

The redevelopment plan involved turning the old White Gold Club into a full-service shopping mall, which would bring the GMall brand to Cebu, the first GMall brand outside Mindanao. The redevelopment plan, which happened immediately after White Gold's closure in 2018, was projected to cost ₱1 billion and was supposed to take two years, but due to the COVID-19 pandemic, it took another two years to complete. The group already had plans of bringing the Gaisano Mall brand to Cebu in the late 1990s, which would have been constructed along Natalio Bacalso Avenue beside the Cebu Institute of Technology, before abandoning the project because of the 1997 Asian financial crisis.

The mall officially opened on December 1, 2022, with its two anchor stores: GMarket (a supermarket) and GStore (a department store).
