= Eddie Ybanez =

Filipino entrepreneur and CEO of MiCab

- Born: March 19, 1986 (age 39) (Philippines)
- Occupation: Filipino entrepreneur
- Employer: CEO of Micab (formerly MiCab)

Eddie Ybanez (born March 19, 1986) is a Filipino entrepreneur and former Chief Executive Officer (CEO) of MiCab, a taxi-hailing service in the Philippines. Ybanez founded Micab with the aim of addressing urban transportation challenges in the country, offering an alternative to traditional ride-sharing platforms. Ybanez's work helped position Micab as a competitor in the local transportation sector.

Ybanez's vision for Micab centered on leveraging technology to improve the commuting experience while supporting local taxi operators. Micab differentiated itself by partnering directly with taxi companies rather than individual drivers.

After stepping down from his role at Micab in 2019, Ybanez confirmed that he would no longer be involved in the company's operations. Ybanez has devoted more time to Payruler, an HR software startup he co-founded, where he is Chief Technology Officer (CTO). Ybanez now leads PasaJob as CEO.
