= SM City Caloocan =

Shopping mall in Caloocan, Philippines

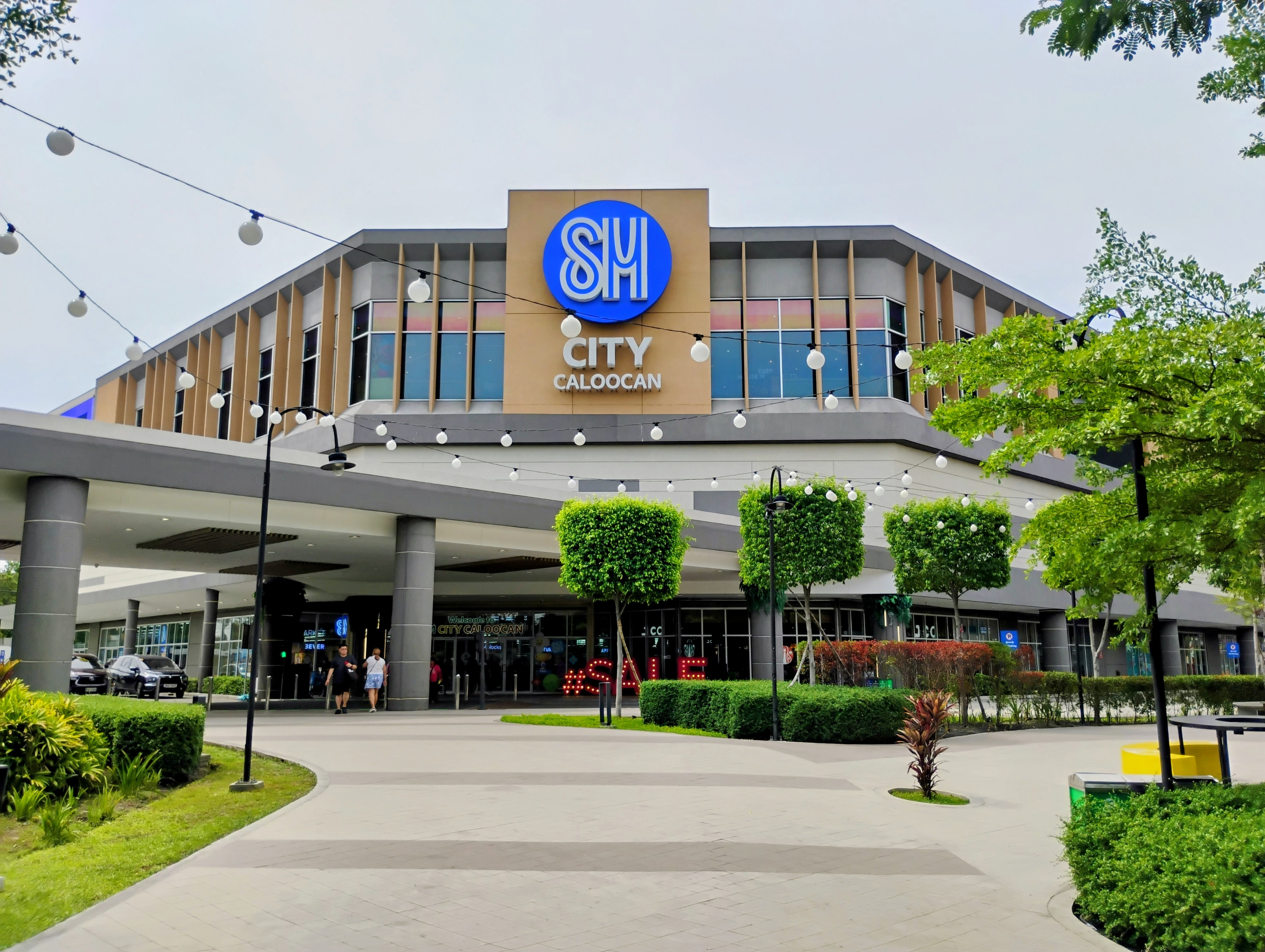
- Location: Caloocan, Metro Manila, Philippines
- Coordinates: 14°45′05″N 121°01′14″E
- Address: Deparo Road, Barangay 171, Zone 15, District 1, Bagumbong
- Opened: May 17, 2024; 2 years ago
- Developer: SM Prime Holdings
- Manager: SM Prime Holdings
- Num. of stores: 400+
- Num. of anchor tenants: 9
- Floor area: 94,000 m^{2} (1,010,000 sq ft)
- Floors: Main Mall: 3; Parking Lot: 4
- Parking: 1,000+
- Public transit: 13 Caloocan
- Website: SM City Caloocan

SM City Caloocan (also known locally as SM Deparo or SM City Deparo) is a shopping mall owned by SM Prime Holdings. It is located along Deparo Road, Malapitan Road, Brgy Bagumbong, Caloocan, Metro Manila. The third SM Supermall in Caloocan after SM Center Sangandaan and SM City Grand Central, 85th SM Supermall in the Philippines after SM City Sto. Tomas and the 25th SM Supermall in Metro Manila after SM City Grand Central and SM City East Ortigas. It has a total gross floor area of 94,000 square meters (1,010,000 square feet).

== History ==
The mall-blessing was on May 16, 2024, and the ribbon-cutting for the grand opening on May 17, 2024.

== Features ==
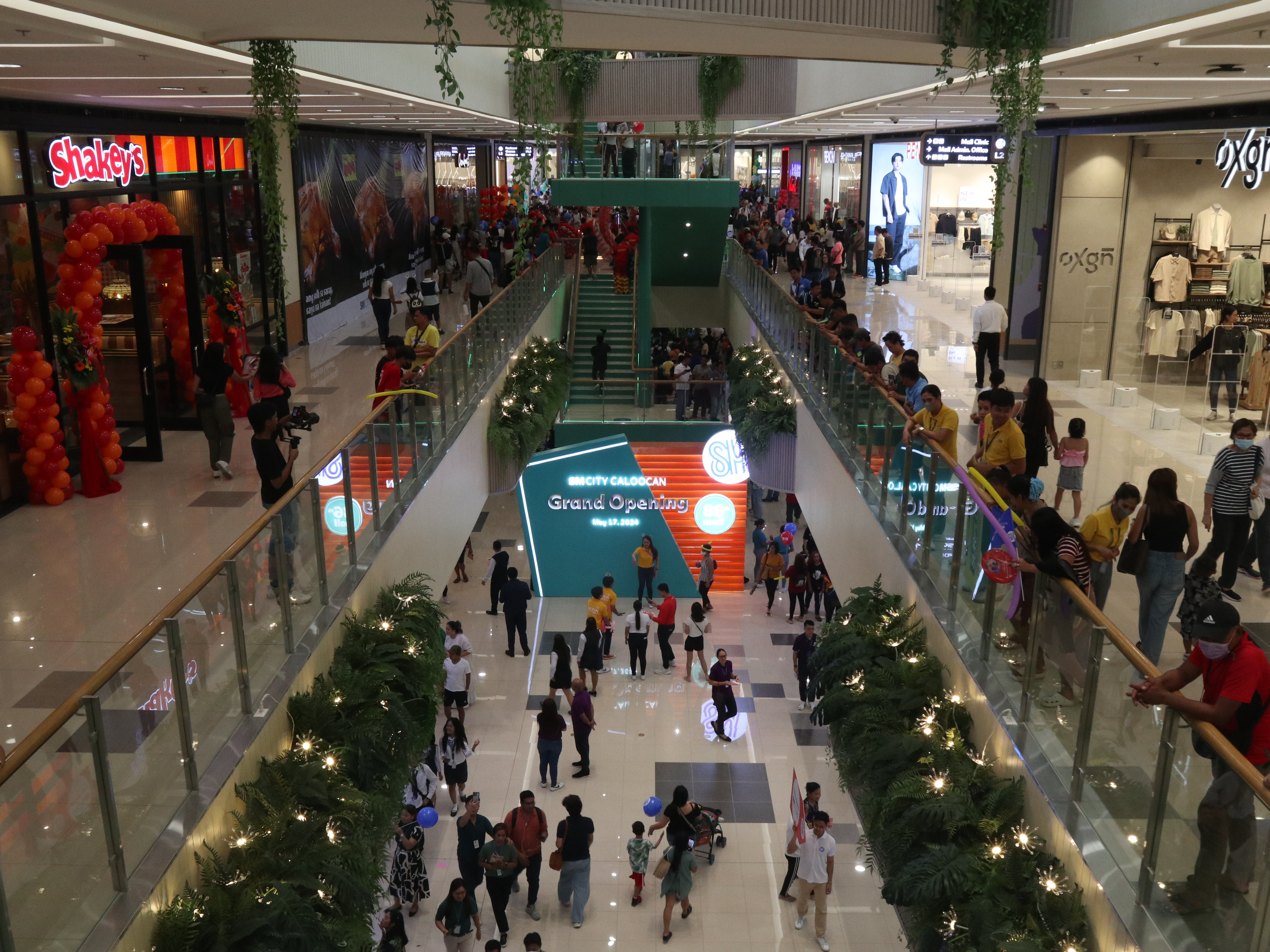
Mall atrium

=== Design ===
The three-story and nearly 94,000-square-meter (1,010,000 sq ft) mall design is the modern of the SM Malls. It represents the beauty of the Philippine malls. It also has a Cyberzone and an outdoor transport terminal. It also has a mascot that is a giant, fluffy panda named Cali. It is located in front of Caloocan Sports Complex.

=== Tenants ===
The tenants of SM City Caloocan are SM Store, SM Supermarket, Ace Hardware, Uniqlo, Miniso, Watsons, SM Appliance Center, Surplus and other anchor tenant stores. It also has four cinemas on the third floor of the mall.

Preceded by SM City Sto. Tomas	86th SM Supermall; 2024	Succeeded by SM J Mall
