= Parkmall =

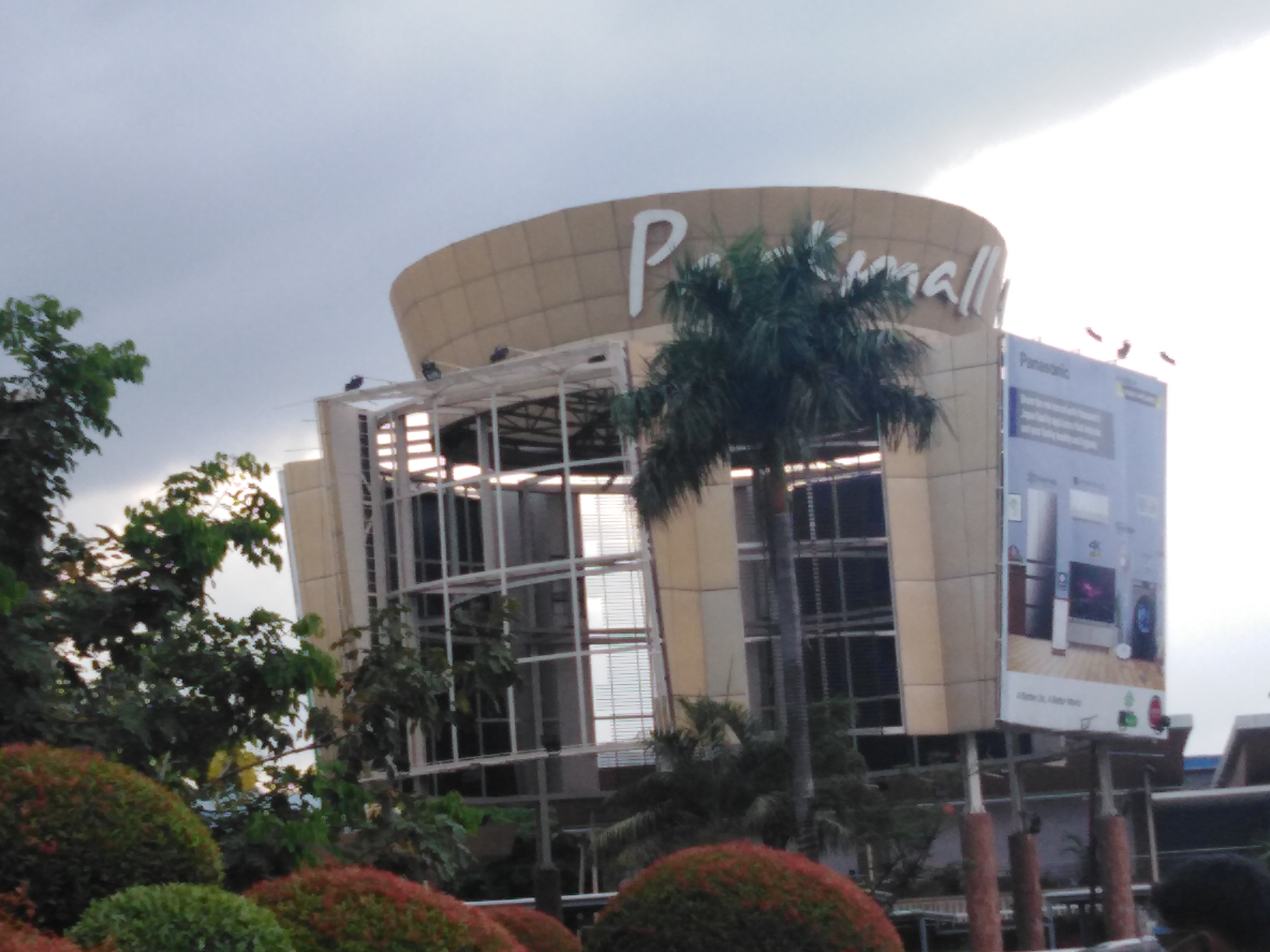
- Parkmall
- Location: Mandaue City, Philippines
- Coordinates: 10°19′32″N 123°56′03″E
- Address: Ouano Avenue, Mandaue Reclamation Area, Mandaue, 6014 Cebu
- Developer: Golden Great Value Properties Inc.
- Num. of stores: Over 200
- Floor area: 30,000 m^{2} (320,000 sq ft)
- Floors: 2
- Public transit: 01K Urgello; 23D MEZ 2 Estate - Robinsons Galleria Cebu; 23D Pajo Terminal - Robinsons Galleria Cebu; 24 Consolacion; 25 Liloan; MI-01B Punta Engaño; MI-02B Marigondon Crossing (via Pacific Mall, Marcelo Fernan Bridge, MEZ 1, Mactan Newtown); MI-04A MEZ 2 Estate; MI-23A Pajo Terminal, Lapu-Lapu City Public Market, Opon; CL SU Tintay (via Canduman, Talamban); SU IT Park - MEZ 2 Estate; SU IT Park - Cordova; MB Mactan–Cebu International Airport; MB SM J Mall - SM Seaside City
- Website: https://parkmallcebu.com/

Parkmall is an independent shopping mall located in Mandaue, Philippines. It is owned and operated by Golden Great Value Properties Inc., and has been operating since 2008.

== History ==
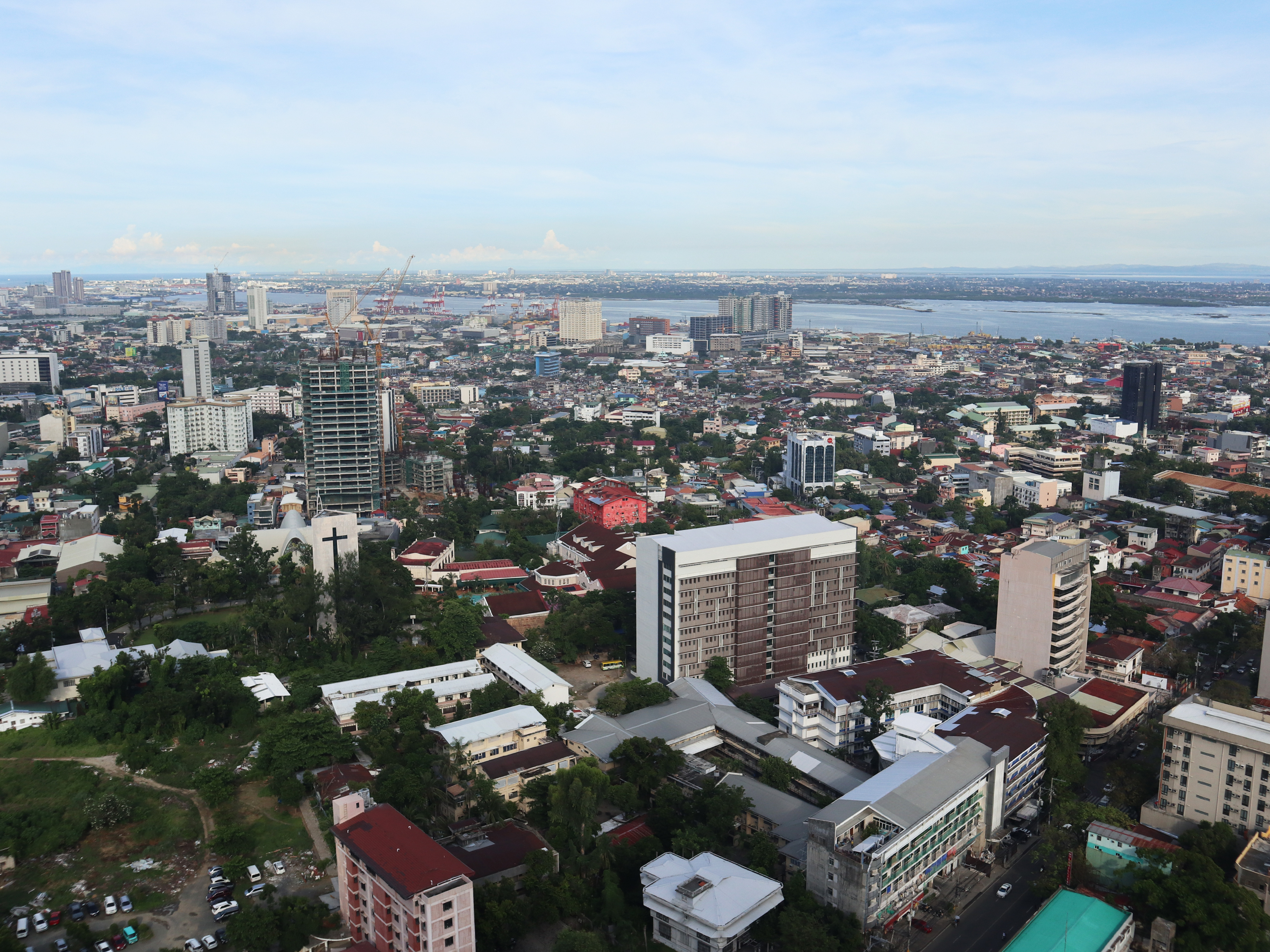
North Reclamation Area

Parkmall started as a six-hectare partially developed lot by Uniwide that was originally intended to be a warehouse club in the North Reclamation Area. The premises were then offered to the Co Family (Golden Great Value Properties Inc.) by the Mandaue City Government after the original developer failed to comply with the City's requirements. The mall was reported to be in development for as early as 2006 with a reported cost of ₱500 million, and eventually opened sometime in early 2008.

== Features ==
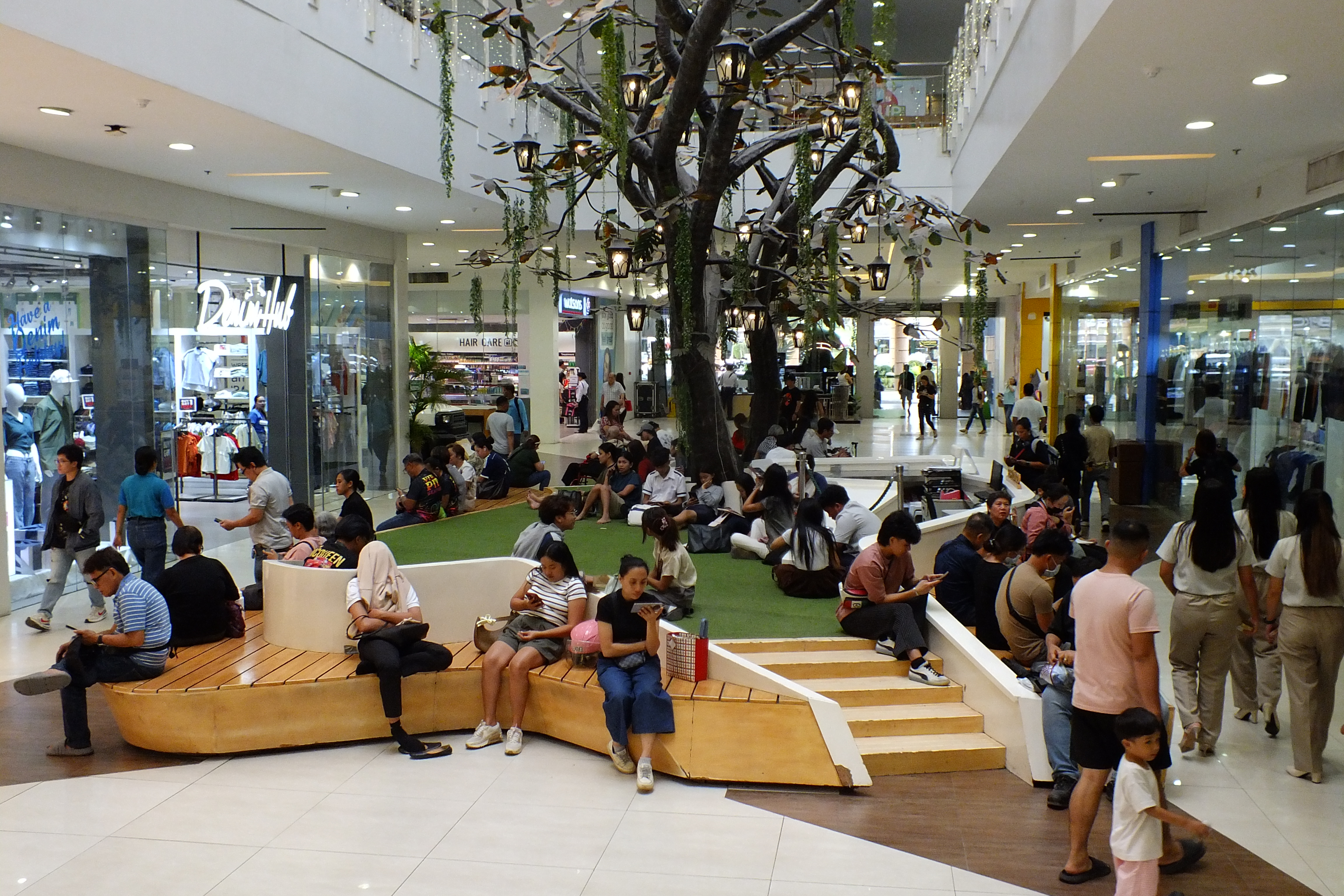
Parkmall's seating area

Parkmall is a reported 30,000 m^{2} (320,000 sq ft) two-level mall that focuses on an outdoor-centered theme.

=== Alfresco ===
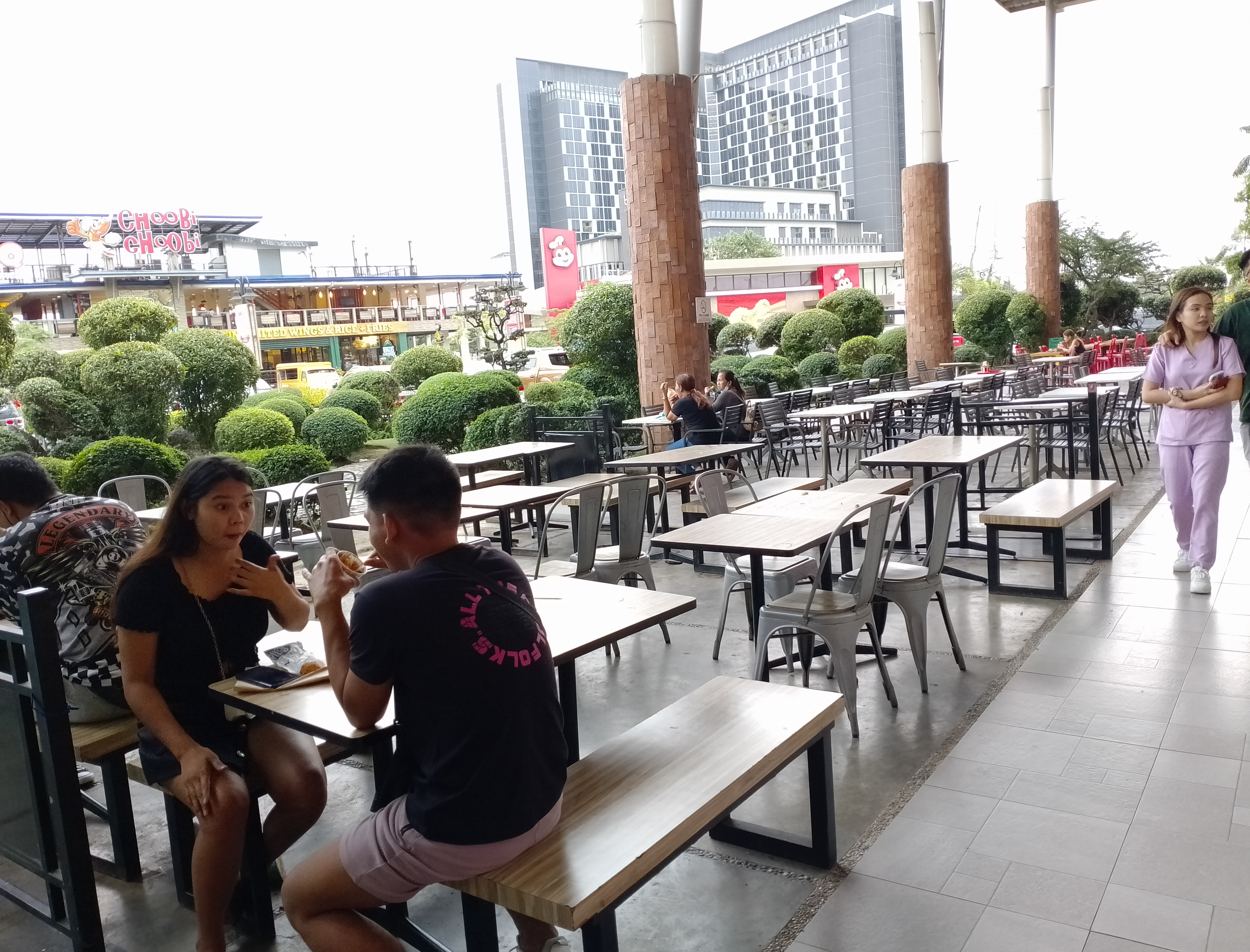
Parkmall's Alfresco

The mall has extensive outdoor dining areas known as Alfresco.

=== The Plaza Bazaar ===
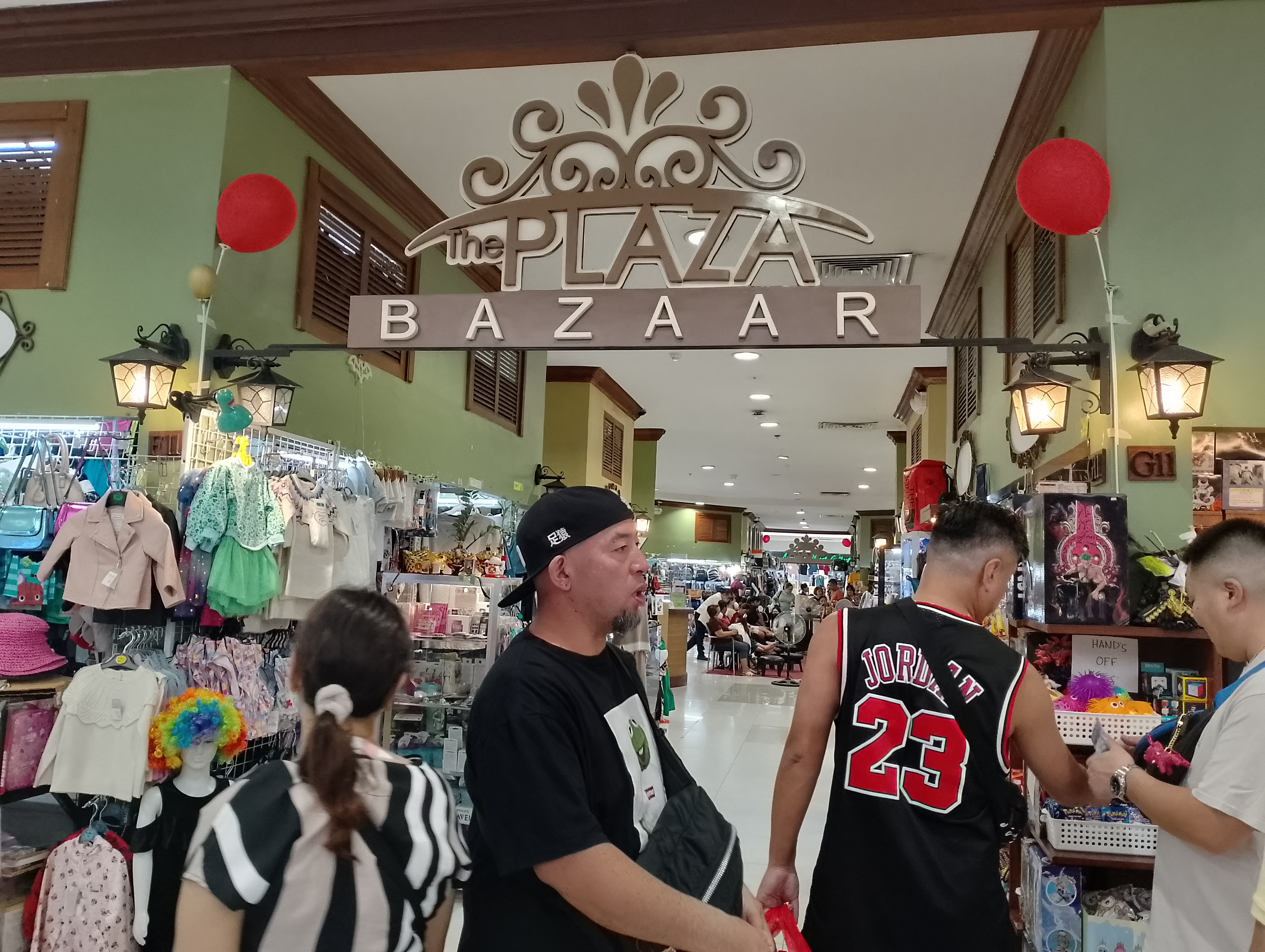
The Plaza Bazaar

The Plaza Bazaar comprises small shops notably selling apparel. The area also has a reputation of selling counterfeit goods.

=== Transport Terminal ===
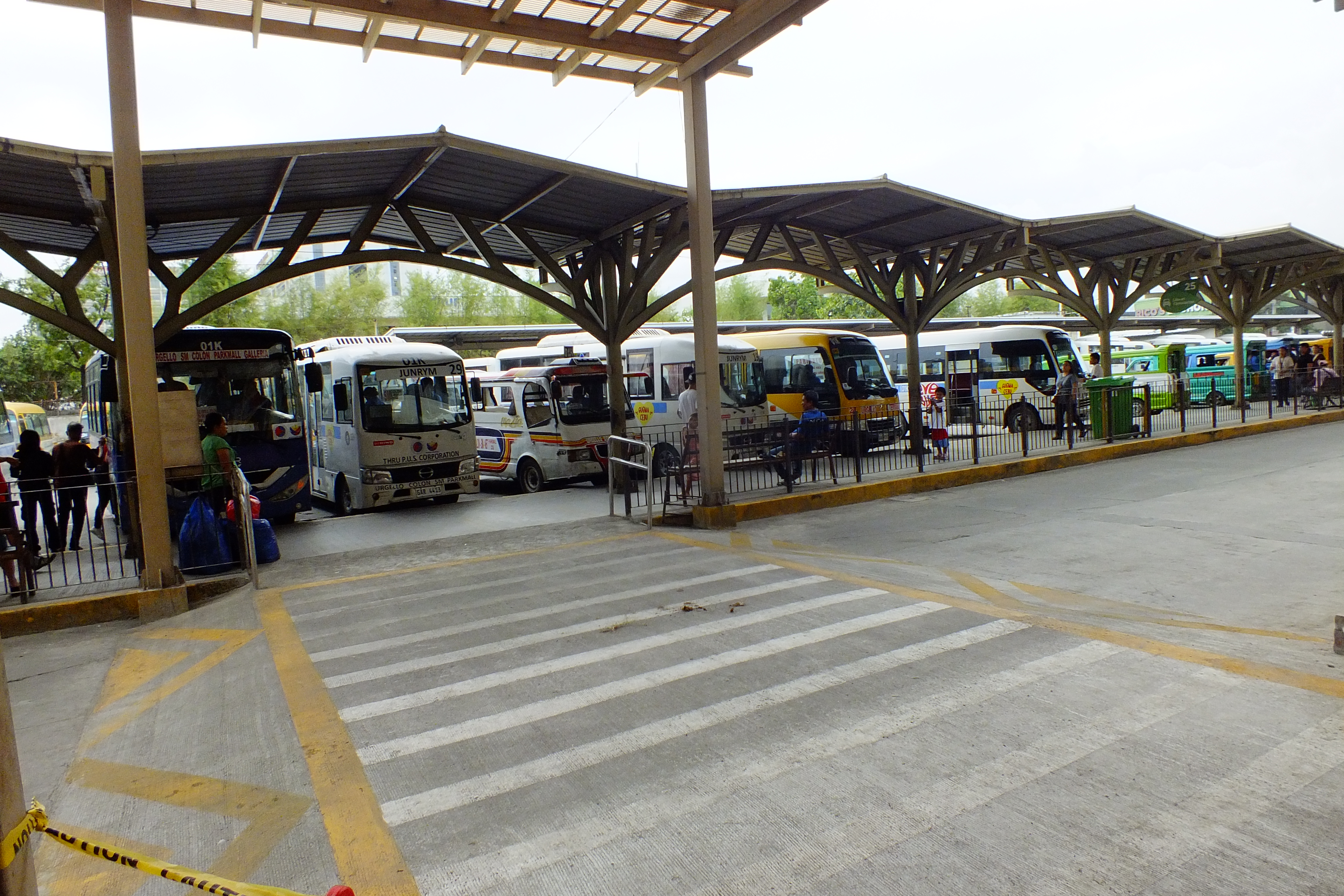
Parkmall's terminal

The mall has a large transport terminal servicing transport throughout Metro Cebu, mainly hosting modernized jeepneys.

=== Pet-friendly ===
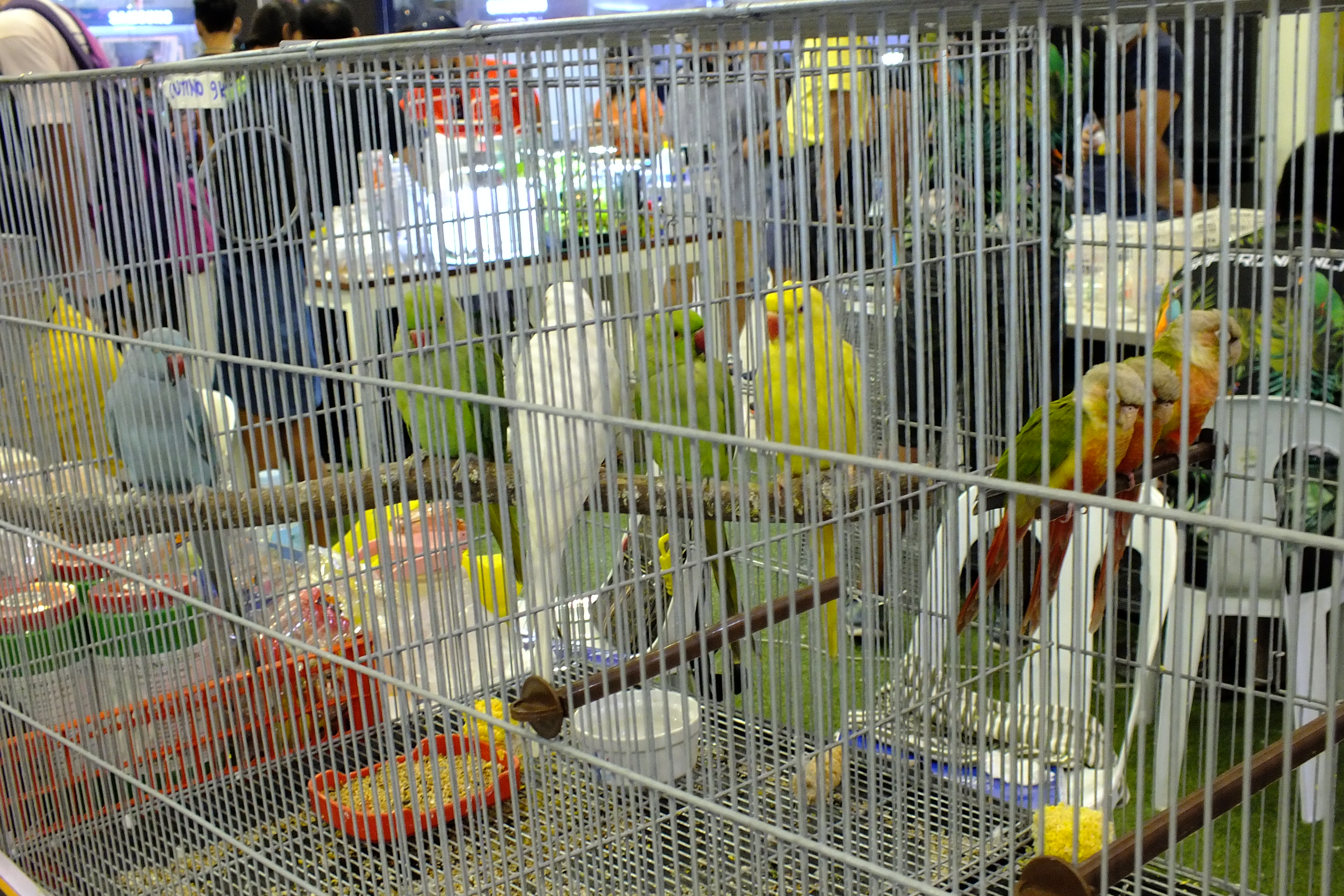
Parrots in Parkmall

The mall proclaims itself as pet-friendly, regularly having events and accommodations catered towards them.
