= MiCab =

Taxicab hailing mobile app

MiDriver
- Formerly: MiCab (2012-2019)
- Company type: Privately held company
- Industry: Vehicle for hire, IT
- Founder: Eddie Ybanez; Kenneth Baylosis
- Headquarters: Cebu City, Philippines
- Area served: Philippines - Cebu City, Davao City, Iloilo, and Metro Manila
- Key people: Kenneth Baylosis (CEO)
- Services: Vehicle for hire
- Website: www.micab.co

Micab is a mobile app for hailing taxicabs in the Philippines. It was founded in 2012 and is headquartered in Cebu City. The company operates in Cebu City, Davao City, Iloilo, and Metro Manila.

Unlike other taxi hailing mobile apps, Micab does not monetize from users. Instead it monetizes through companies and brands who want to reach its substantial user base.

== History ==
Micab was conceived at Startup Weekend Cebu in November 2012 by co-founders Eddie Ybanez and Kenneth Baylosis. They originally envisioned Micab as a SMS-based taxi-hailing solution, but eventually pivoted into a mobile app available on both Android and iOS.

In July 2017, Micab was serving about 20,000 passengers per month, with more than 200,000 monthly bookings. It announced two major partnerships with both the Philippine National Taxi Operators Association (PNTOA) and the Association of Taxi Operators in Metro Manila (ATOMM), giving Micab access to more than 20,000 taxis.
