= Qualfon =

Mexican call center outsourcing company

Qualfon, Inc.
- Company type: Private company
- Industry: Call centres
- Founded: 1995; 31 years ago
- Headquarters: Mexico City, Mexico
- Area served: International clients
- Products: Call centers, BPO and back-office processing
- Services: Business process outsourcing (BPO), telemarketing, call center consulting, technical support, collections, lead generation, and back-office support
- Number of employees: 15,000 (2020)
- Divisions: Qualfon Data Solutions Group (DSG)
- Website: https://www.qualfon.com/

Qualfon is a Mexican multi-national company that supplies outsourcing services to call centers, back offices, and business processes. The company was founded in 1995 and has a history of acquisitions. It is privately held company operating across a number of countries with a focus on business process outsourcing (BPO).

Qualfon has a decentralised structure, its CEO is based in Florida and the company operates in Mexico, the United States, the Philippines, Guyana, China, Costa Rica and India.

== History ==
The company was founded in 1995 with operations in Mexico City.

In March 2013 Qualfon acquired Data Control Group (DCG), which is now called the Qualfon Data Services Group and performs back-office processing.

In May 2014 Qualfon acquired Center Partners, a United States contact center outsourcing company.

In April 2016 Qualfon acquired Culture.Service.Growth (CSG), a contact center services company based in San Antonio, Texas.

In December 2017 Qualfon acquired Dialog Direct, a business process outsourcing company that provides lead generation, sales, and customer support services. Medi-cal outsources a significant amount of their customer service to Qualfon.
