= Transportation in Metro Cebu =

Overview of urban transportation in Cebu City

Transportation within Cebu City is mainly land-based with most parts of the city accessible by road. There is no existing mass transit but construction is currently being undertaken on the partially-operational Cebu Bus Rapid Transit (CBRT) as well as existing proposals for a Cebu Monorail and the Cebu Urban Mass Rapid Transit (UMRT), both of which will be crucial in solving the city's worsening traffic congestion, as existing transportation modes will soon become insufficient to move residents around the city if the local government fails to urgently implement infrastructure projects and measures to address the issue.

== Public transport ==
=== Regulations ===
The public transportation system is regulated by the Land Transportation Franchising and Regulatory Board which is responsible for promulgating, administering, enforcing, and monitoring compliance of policies, laws, and regulations of public land transportation services.

== Road transport ==
=== Jeepneys and modern jeepneys ===
Just like any other place in the Philippines, jeepney is the most popular means of public transportation in the city. Modern jeepneys have also started plying the roads of the city namely Beep operated by Persano Corp. and PeoplesJeep operated by Cebu People's Multi-Purpose Cooperative.

Beep has 40 vehicles in the city, with 20 units in two routes which goes from Cebu City Hall to Cebu IT Park via Robinsons Galleria, Cebu Business Park and vice versa. The other route goes from Paseo Arcenas at R. Duterte Street to Sykes in Panagdait, Barangay Mabolo via Happy Valley, Fuente Osmeña, Ramos St., D. Jakosalem St., Cebu Business Park and vice versa. Each air conditioned beep has a seating capacity of 24 passengers, and can accommodate an additional 10 standing passengers. The service also operates 24/7. Recently, they have also opened a third route which goes from Guadalupe to Carbon Market.

PeoplesJeep is a new modern jeepney that was launched in September 2019 with 15 units in 3 routes: Talamban-Ayala-Colon, Lahug-Ayala-SM and Bulacao-Colon-SM. Starting October 1, 2019, they will charge a passenger fare of PHP 10.

=== Buses ===
Most of the buses and mini-buses are stationed in Cebu North Bus Terminal (CNBT) at SM City Cebu, North Reclamation Area, Cebu City, and in Cebu South Bus Terminal (CSBT) at N. Bacalso Avenue, Cebu City, both owned by the Cebu Provincial Government. The terminals serve passengers heading to the northern and southern parts of Cebu and neighboring provinces of Negros Oriental, Negros Occidental, Siquijor, Zamboanga del Norte, and Zamboanga del Sur.

MyBus, a public bus transportation operated by Metro Rapid Transit Services, Inc. (MRTSI), serves passengers coming the city going to Talisay City, Mandaue City up to Mactan–Cebu International Airport. It can accommodate up to 90 passengers including standing passengers. A MyBus expansion added a 9.5 kilometers new route starting from the SM City Cebu – Cebu International Port to SM J Mall in October 2024. In 2017, it began operations along City di Mare at the South Road Properties.

The route of the Cebu BRT spans from the South Road Properties (SRP) to the Cebu IT Park, with dedicated sections and BRT stations along the median of Osmeña Boulevard and mixed-traffic for the rest. The route starts at Il Corso and terminates at Cebu IT Park and vice versa.

=== Vehicles for hire ===
There were 6,000 taxicabs operating in Cebu as of early 2018 according to the Land Transportation Franchising and Regulatory Board (LTFRB) in Region 7 and most of which ply the roads of Cebu City. The minimum flag down rate is PHP40 with an additional PHP13.50 for every succeeding kilometer and PHP2 for every two minutes of waiting time during traffic. They can be flagged down at any time of the day along any roads in the city.

Grab and MiCab also operate in Cebu.

=== Motorcycle taxis (habal-habal) ===
Despite being not a legal mode of public transportation in the Philippines, motorcycle taxis, locally known as "habal-habal", have long been a staple in the mountain barangays of Cebu City that are inaccessible by 4-wheel vehicles. Due to the high volume of traffic in some parts of the city and convenience of passengers especially during rush hours, several motorcycle taxis have propagated in the lowland with more than 6,000 of them that can be hailed along the road or can be booked using Angkas, a motorcycle-hailing platform. Fare for motorcycle taxis not under Angkas is done thru negotiation with the driver.

The city government has also been supportive of this mode of public transportation and spearheaded in organizing its drivers to address concerns about passenger safety. A bill was refiled by Cebu City North District Representative Raul del Mar in the House of Representatives to legalize the operations of motorcycle taxis while a pending city ordinance regulating motorcycle taxis has the support of the city's mayor Edgardo Labella.

=== Horse-drawn carriages (tartanilla) ===
Before the introduction of motorized vehicles in 1901, "tartanillas" were the primary means of transportation in the city until the 1970s. Also known in Filipino as "kalesa", these two-wheeled carriage drawn by a single horse have only limited routes covering Barangays Pasil & Duljo Fatima and Magallanes, Taboan & Carbon Streets.

=== Motorized and electric tricycles ===
Motorized tricycle is a mode of transportation for tertiary roads in the city and are not allowed on national highways. Some electric tricycles or "e-trikes" are also starting to appear in certain roads of the city.

=== Pedal-operated tricycles (trisikads) ===
This mode of transportation locally known as trisikad (also called as sikad or sikad-sikad) is commonly used in accessing inner roads in the urban area of the city. Similar to motorized tricycles, they are not allowed to ply on national highways.

== Maritime transport ==
Passenger and cargo ships coming from within and outside the country arrive at the Port of Cebu which is managed by the Cebu Port Authority. The city is home to more than 80% of the country's island vessels traveling on domestic routes mostly in the Visayas and Mindanao.

Ferry boats going to Lapu-Lapu dock at Pier 3. Those operated by Metro Ferry, Inc. can accommodate up to 270 passengers with a travel time of 15 minutes to Muelle Osmeña docking point while those operated by Topline Marina can accommodate 325 passengers with a travel time of 35 to 40 minutes.

== Infrastructure ==
=== Piers ===
The Port of Cebu, located in the North Reclamation Area of Cebu City, Philippines, is the largest domestic port in the Philippines. Managed by the Cebu Port Authority, it mostly serves routes in the Visayas and Mindanao. It is situated in the Mactan Channel, a narrow strait between the islands of Cebu and Mactan.

=== Roads and expressways ===
==== Cebu-Cordova Link Expressway ====
Cebu City has its first toll bridge expressway of the Cebu–Cordova Link Expressway (CCLEX) in April 2022. CCLEX connects to the city of Cordova and provides an alternative route for passengers going to Lapu-Lapu City.

==== Metro Cebu Expressway ====
At approximately 73.75 km (45.82 mi) long, the proposed Metro Cebu Expressway, also known as the Cebu Circumferential Road, will serve as an alternative highway connecting Naga City to Danao to address the traffic congestion within Metro Cebu and will cross the mountain barangays of Cebu City.
