= Big Bad Wolf Books =

Book fair in Malaysia

- Status: Active
- Genre: Book fairs
- Venue: Varies in each countries
- Country: Malaysia (origin) Other countries: Indonesia; Myanmar; Pakistan; Philippines; Sri Lanka; Taiwan; Thailand; United Arab Emirates
- Inaugurated: 13 May 2009; 17 years ago
- Founder: Andrew Yap, Jacqueline Ng
- Sponsor: BookXcess
- Website: www.bigbadwolfbooks.com

Big Bad Wolf Books (The Big Bad Wolf Book Sale or BBW Books) is a Malaysian book fair frequently held in Malaysia, Indonesia, Myanmar, Pakistan, the Philippines, Sri Lanka, Taiwan, Thailand and the United Arab Emirates. The books were majorly taken from the stocks of BookXcess, a book store dealing in excess or remaindered books from international distributors. The sale was the brainchild of BookXcess founders Andrew Yap and Jacqueline Ng. It was first held on 13–18 May 2009 for 5 days at Dataran Hamodal, Petaling Jaya.

The book fair sells all kind of books genres, for example fiction, non-fiction, novels, literature, children's literature and young adult fiction. It also sells merchandise including collectible books and posters, wallpaper, movie posters, tin-plated signs and their own merchandise.

== Fairs held ==
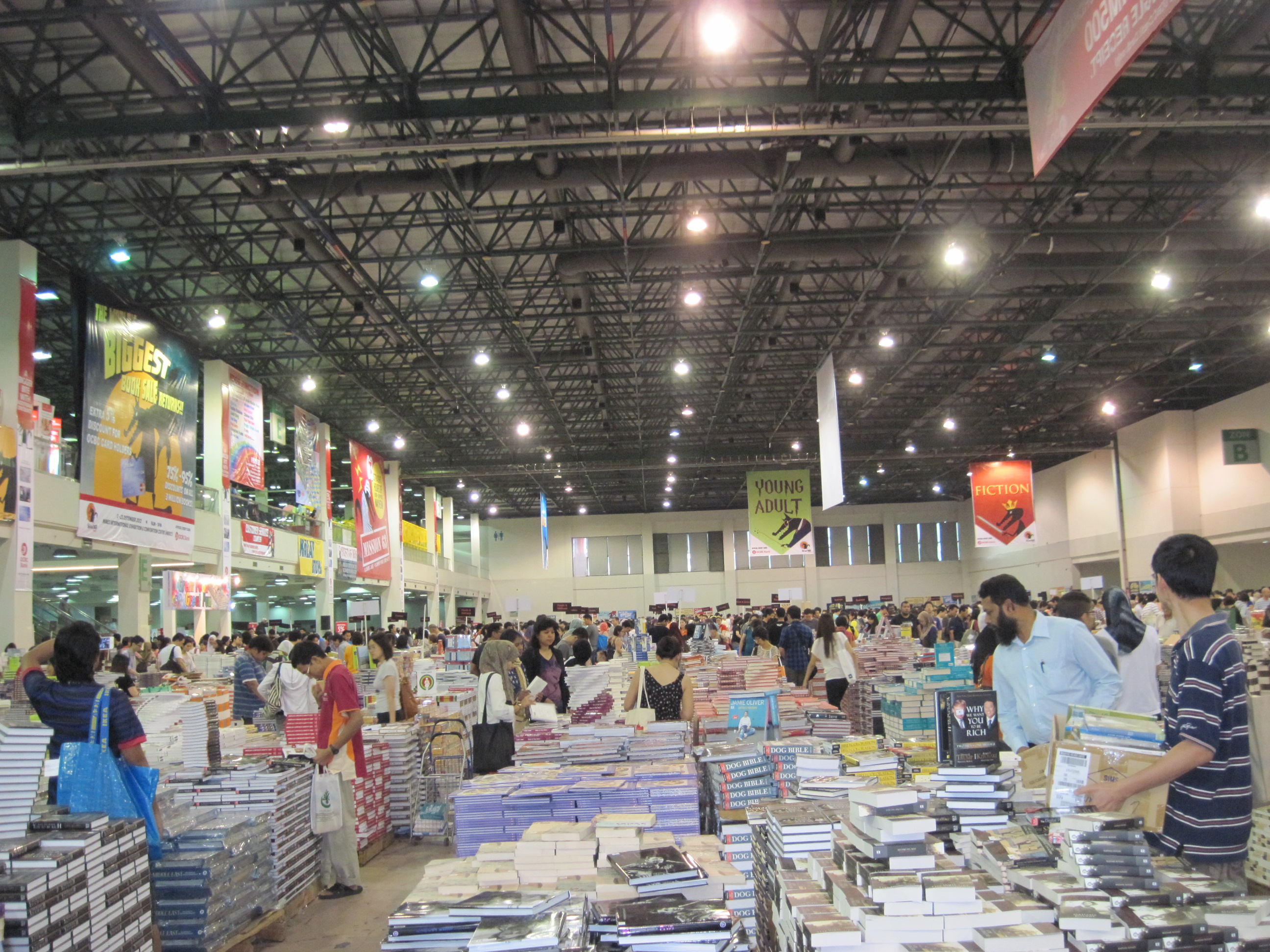
View of BBWBooks on 7 December 2012

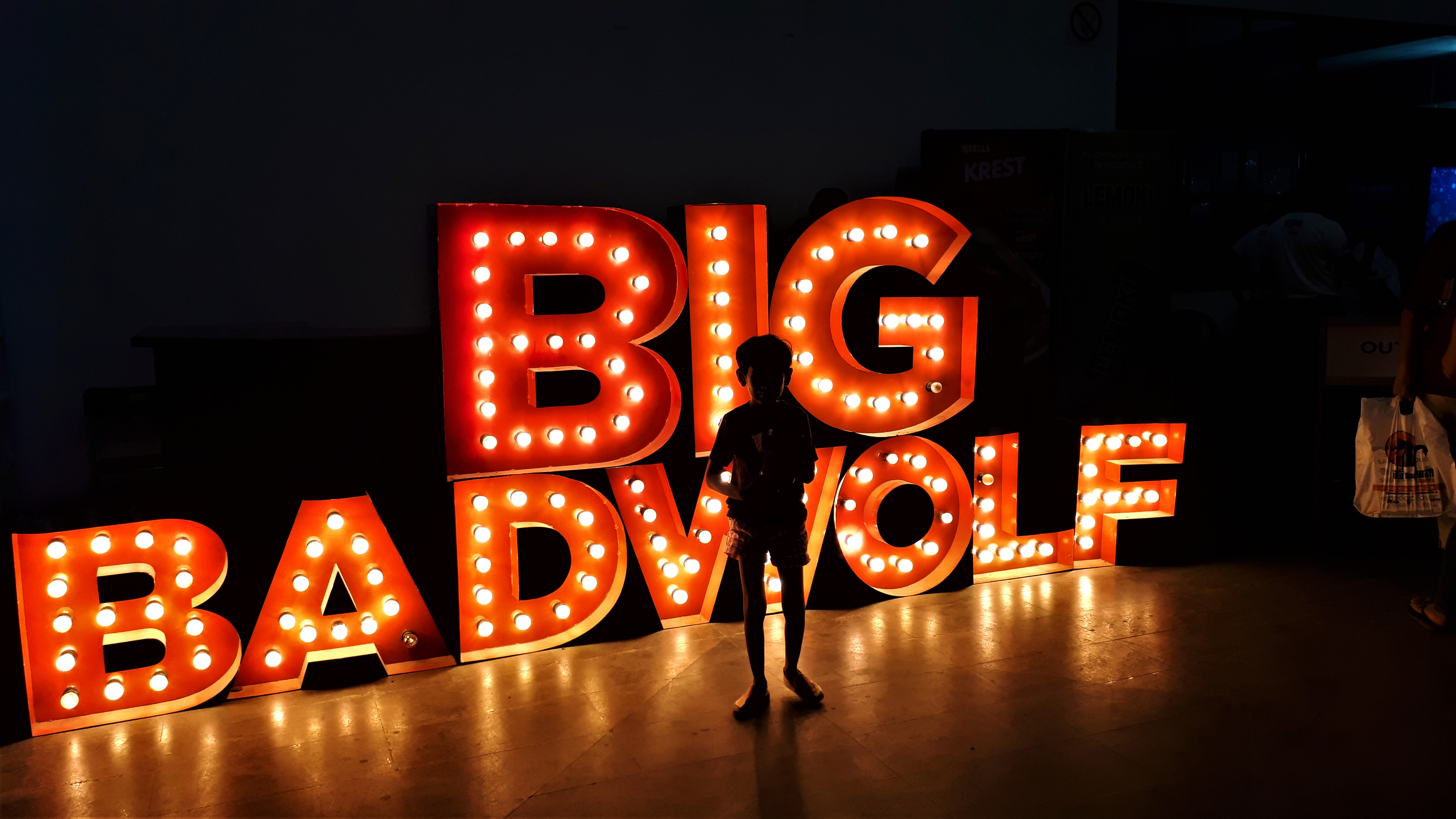
Big Bad Wolf signage, Colombo, Sri Lanka 2017.

Year	Date	Venue	Ref.
2009	13–18 May	Dataran Hamodal, Petaling Jaya, Selangor, Malaysia
2009	26 November–2 December	Amcorp Mall, Petaling Jaya, Selangor, Malaysia
2010	12–17 November	South City Plaza, Seri Kembangan, Selangor, Malaysia
2011	7–15 October	Malaysia Agro Exposition Park Serdang, Seri Kembangan, Selangor, Malaysia
2011	24–28 November	South City Plaza, Seri Kembangan, Selangor, Malaysia
2012	7–23 December	Malaysia International Exhibition and Convention Centre (MIECC) in Mines Resort City, Seri Kembangan, Selangor, Malaysia
2013	28 February–4 March	MIECC, Seri Kembangan, Selangor, Malaysia
2013	22–31 March	Penang Times Square, George Town, Penang, Malaysia
2013	25–29 April	The Zenith Hotel, Kuantan, Pahang, Malaysia
2013	27 May–2 June	Danga City Mall, Johor Bahru, Johor, Malaysia
2013	24 July–4 August	Amcorp Mall, Petaling Jaya, Selangor, Malaysia
2013	6–15 December	MIECC, The Mines, Kuala Lumpur, Malaysia
2014	15–23 February	MIECC, Seri Kembangan, Selangor, Malaysia
2014	20–30 March	Penang Times Square, George Town, Penang, Malaysia
2014	19–27 April	Malacca International Trade Centre, Ayer Keroh, Melaka, Malaysia
2014	23–25 May	Persiaran Perdana, Putrajaya, Malaysia
2014	30 May–8 June	Danga City Mall, Johor Bahru, Johor, Malaysia
2014	19–24 June	The Zenith Hotel, Kuantan, Pahang, Malaysia
2014	24–29 July	Perfect Home Living Convention Centre, Menglembu, Ipoh, Perak, Malaysia
2014	26 September–1 October	Pasaraya Rapid Seremban 2, Seremban, Negeri Sembilan, Malaysia
2014	5–21 December	MIECC, Seri Kembangan, Selangor, Malaysia
2015
2015	2–9 February	MIECC, Seri Kembangan, Selangor, Malaysia
2015	13–23 March	Penang Times Square, George Town, Penang, Malaysia
2015	24 April–4 May	Malacca International Trade Centre, Ayer Keroh, Melaka, Malaysia
2015	6–11 May	Gong Badak Campus (Universiti Sultan Zainal Abidin), Kuala Terengganu, Terengganu, Malaysia
2015	28 May–7 June	Danga City Mall, Johor Bahru, Johor, Malaysia
2015	29 May–7 June	Mines 2, Seri Kembangan, Selangor, Malaysia
2015	10–20 July	PHL Convention Centre, Ipoh, Perak, Malaysia
2015	27 August–1 September	Pasaraya Rapid Exhibition Hall, Seremban, Negeri Sembilan, Malaysia
2015	24 September–4 October	Penang Times Square, George Town, Penang, Malaysia
2015	4–14 December	MIECC, Seri Kembangan, Selangor, Malaysia
2016
2016	23 January–1 February	Malaysia Agro Exposition Park Serdang, Selangor, Malaysia
2016	26 February–6 March	Penang Times Square, George Town, Penang, Malaysia
2016	30 April–8 May	Indonesia Convention Exhibition, Tangerang, Indonesia
2016	16–26 June	One City, Subang Jaya, Selangor, Malaysia
2016	20-31 October	JX International Convention, Surabaya, Indonesia
2016	9–19 December	MIECC, Seri Kembangan, Selangor, Malaysia
2017
2017	10–19 February	Impact Forum Hall 6, Muang Thong Thani, Nonthaburi, Thailand
2017	21 April–2 May	Indonesia Convention Exhibition, Tangerang, Indonesia
2017	28 September-9 October	JX International Convention, Surabaya, Indonesia
2017	5–15 October	Sri Lanka Exhibition and Convention Centre, Colombo, Sri Lanka
2018	16–25 February	World Trade Center Metro Manila, Pasay, Philippines
2018	29 March–9 April	Indonesia Convention Exhibition, BSD City, Indonesia
2018	28 June–8 July	Sri Lanka Exhibition and Convention Centre, Colombo, Sri Lanka
2018	7–15 July	Borneo744, Kuching, Sarawak, Malaysia
2018	13–23 July	IEC Convention Center, Cebu City, Philippines
2018	10–20 August	Impact Forum Hall 9, Muang Thong Thani, Nonthaburi, Thailand
2018	27 September–8 October	JX International Convention, Surabaya, Indonesia
2018	18–28 October	Dubai Studio City, Dubai, United Arab Emirates
2018	2–12 November	Andromeda Building, Medan, Indonesia
2018	7 November–8 December	International Convention and Exhibition Centre, Chiang Mai, Thailand
2019	17–28 January	Myanmar Event Park, Yangon, Myanmar
2019	1–11 March	Indonesia Convention Exhibition, BSD City, Indonesia
2019	19–29 April	Expo Centre, Lahore, Pakistan
2019	5 May	Mydin Petra Jaya, Kuching, Sarawak, Malaysia
2019	30 May–9 June	Sabah Trade Centre, Kota Kinabalu, Sabah, Malaysia
2019	7–17 June	New Taipei City Exhibition Hall, New Taipei City, Taiwan
2019	28 June–8 July	Kota Baru Parahyangan, Bandung, Indonesia
2019	31 May–10 June	Mandalay Convention Centre, Mandalay, Myanmar
2019	26 July–5 August	Expo Center, Karachi, Pakistan
2019	2–12 August	JogJa Expo Center, Yogyakarta, Indonesia
2019	6–16 September	Andromeda Building, Medan, Indonesia
2019	05–15 October	Dubai Studio City, Dubai, United Arab Emirates
2019	18–28 October	Sri Lanka Exhibition and Convention Centre, Colombo, Sri Lanka
2022	14–24 April	Dubai Studio City, Dubai, United Arab Emirates
2022	24 August–4 September	Hatten Square Level 1, Melaka, Malaysia
2022	9–18 September	Diamond Jubilee Hall, Dar es salaam, Tanzania
2022	7–18 December	Impact Arena Hall 4, Bangkok, Thailand
2023	24 June–3 July	Philippine International Convention Center, Pasay, Philippines
2023	15 September–1 October	SM Seaside City, Cebu City, Philippines
2023	13–23 October	SM City Iloilo, Iloilo City, Philippines
2024	7-15 August	Trinoma, Quezon City, Philippines
2024	18–23 September	Robinsons Manila, Manila, Philippines
2024	13–19 December	Sunway Pyramid, Petaling Jaya, Selangor, Malaysia

== Gallery ==
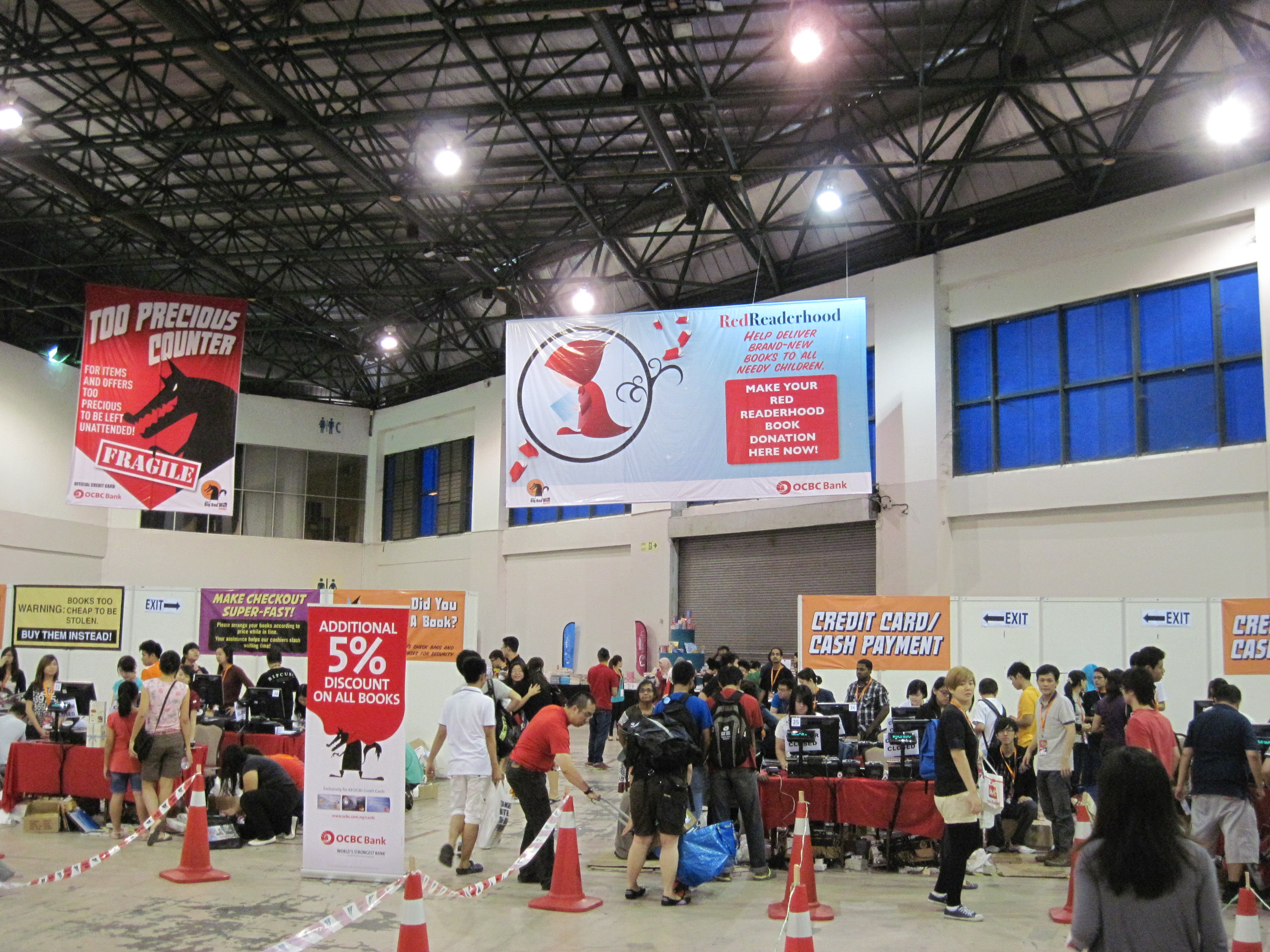
Counter of BBWBooks in 2012

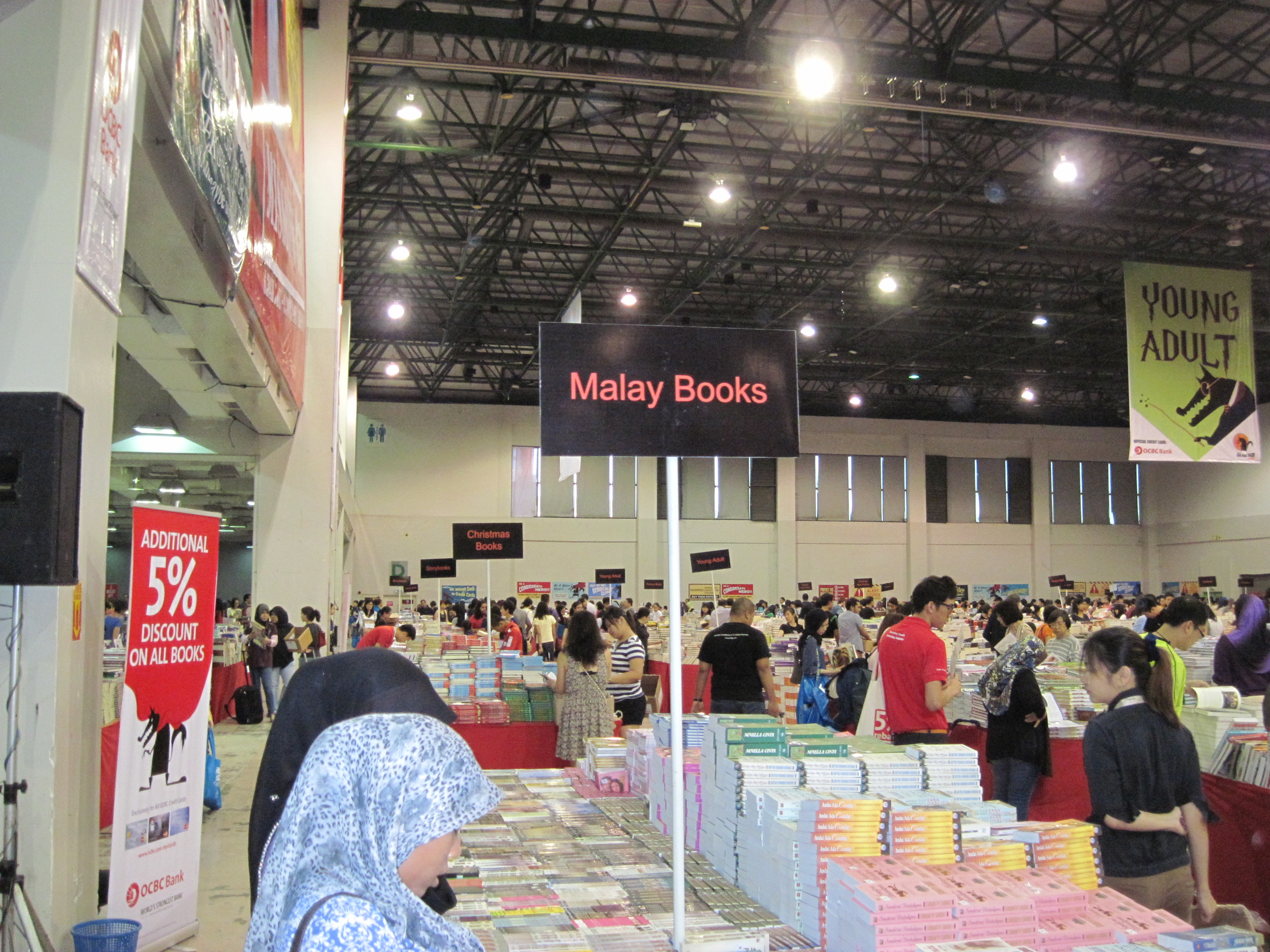
Malay books section on BBWBooks 2012

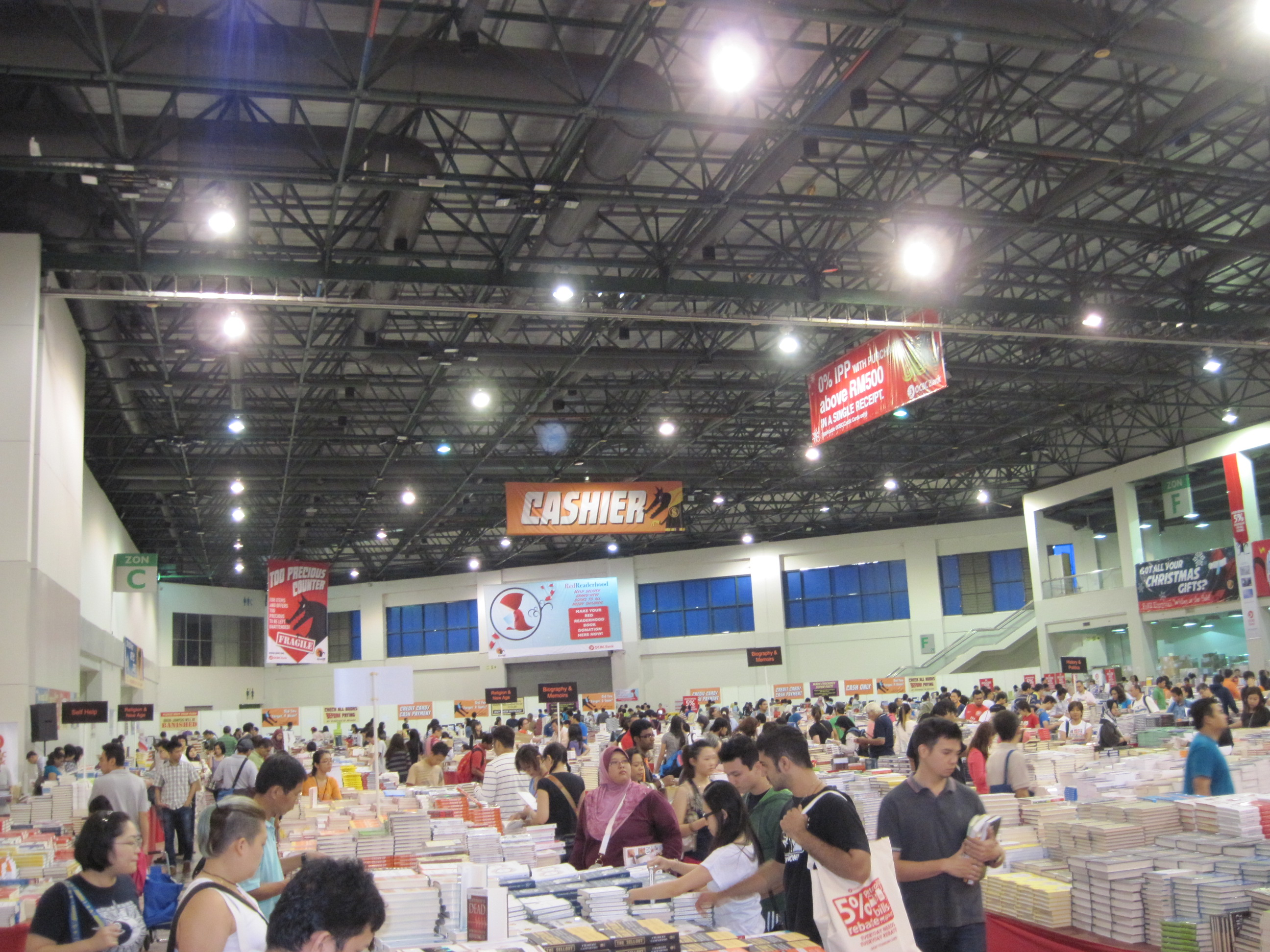
View of BBWBooks 2012

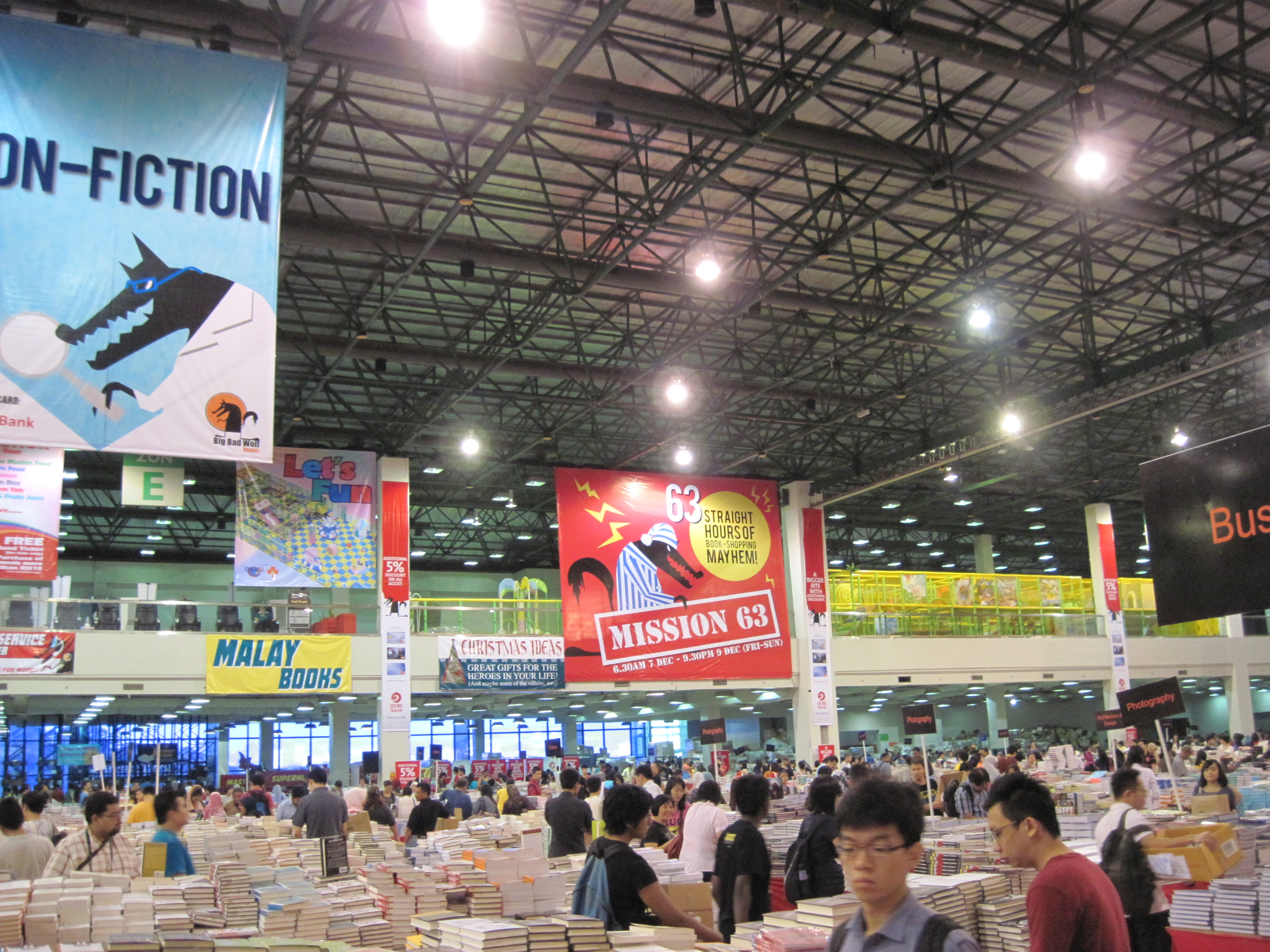
View of BBWBooks 2012

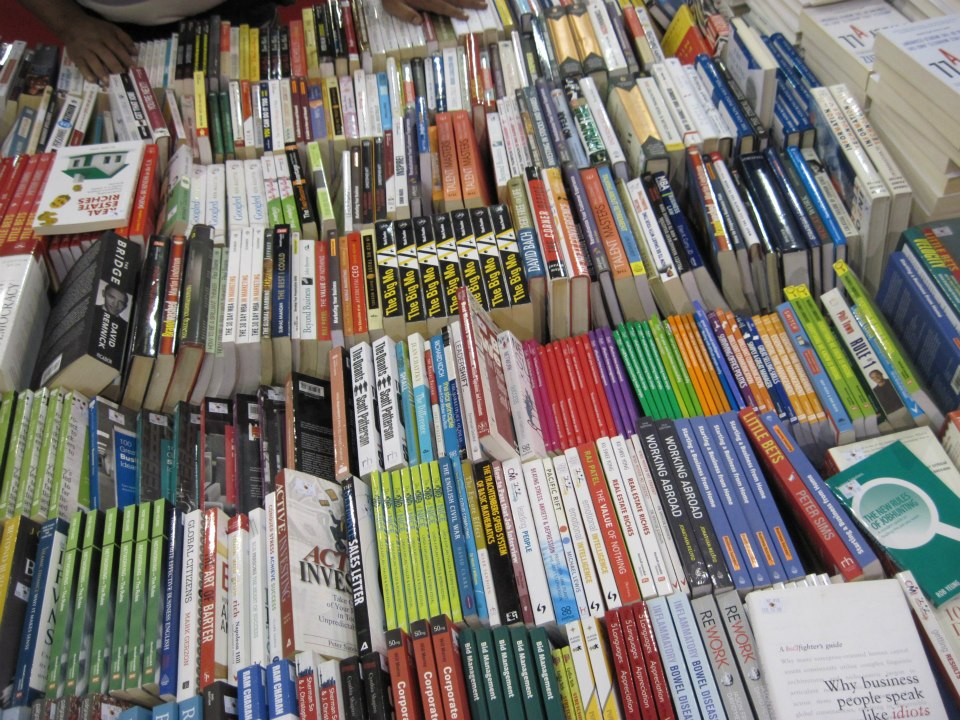
Books of BBWBooks 2012

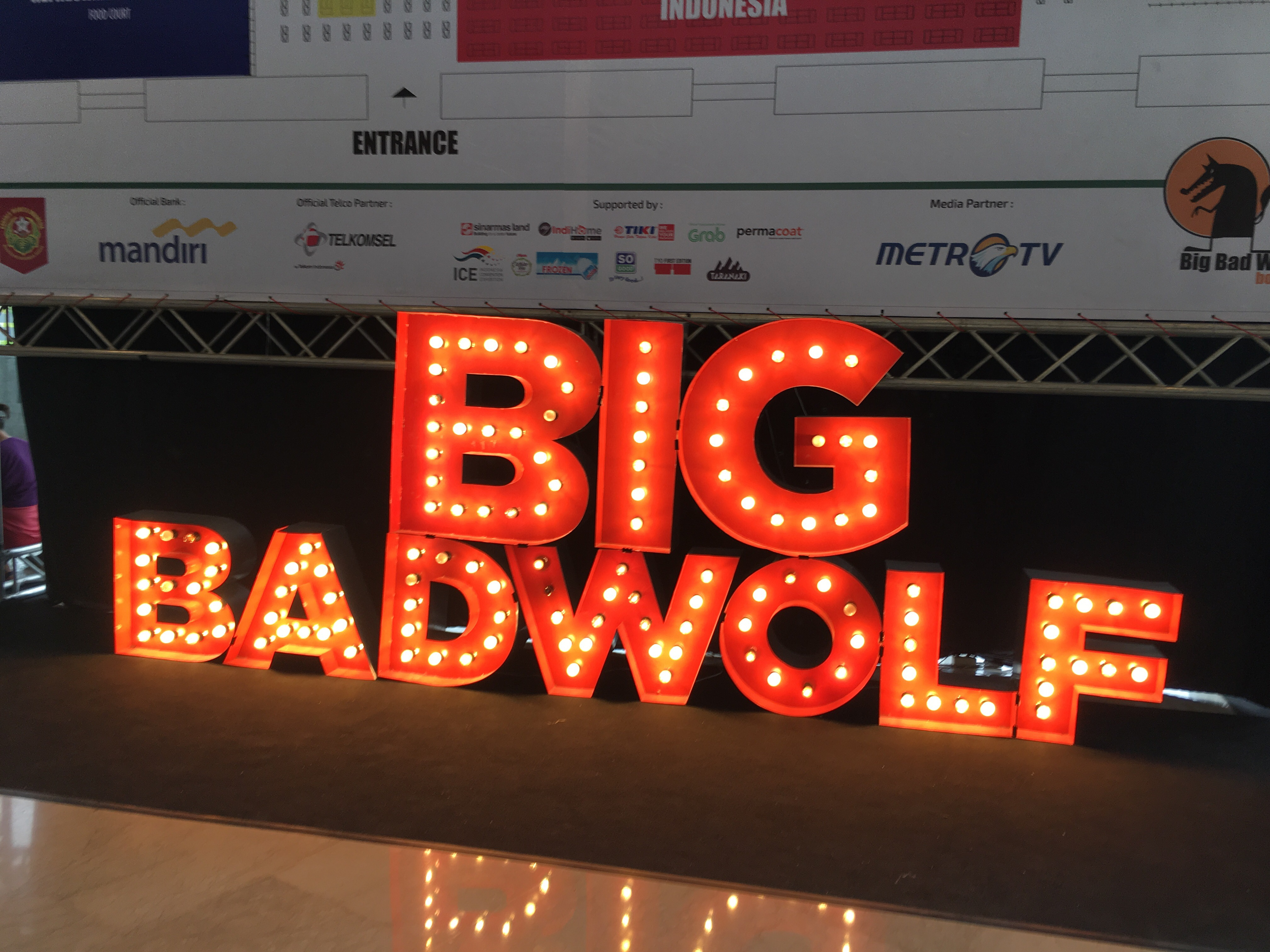
Entrance sign of BBWBooks Jakarta 2017

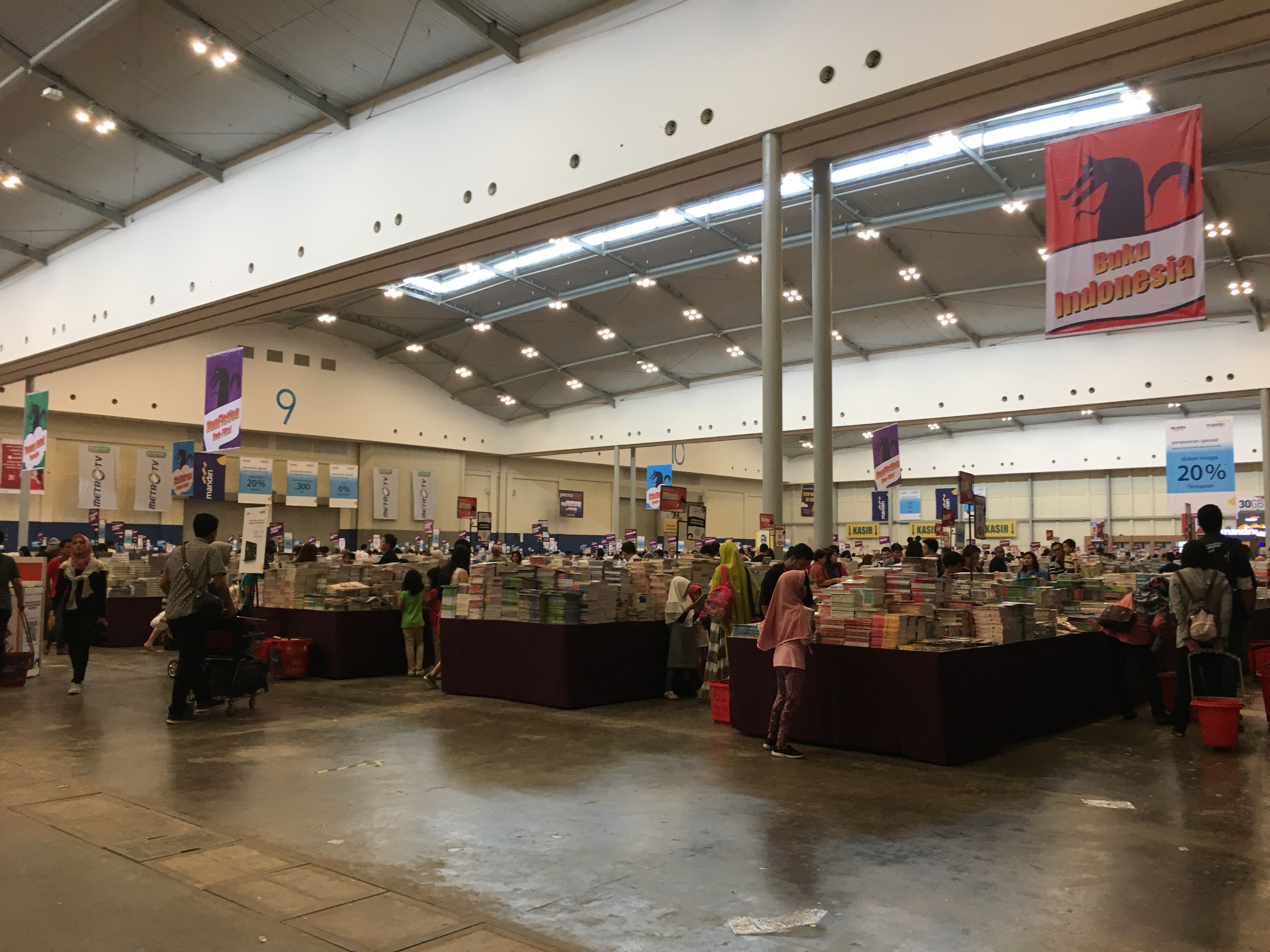
Consumers browsing for Indonesian books at BBWBooks Jakarta 2017

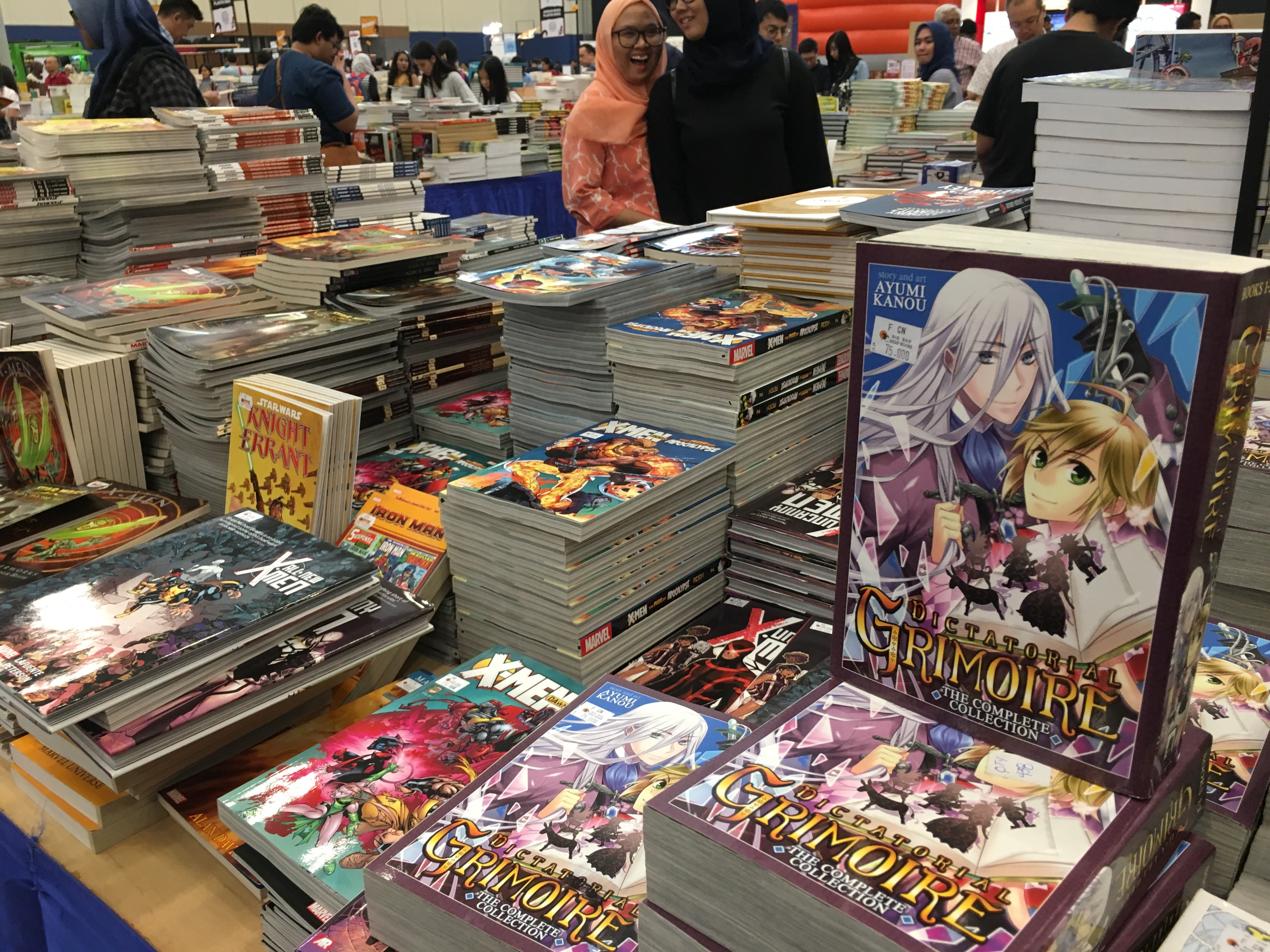
Manga and comic section at BBWBooks Jakarta 2017

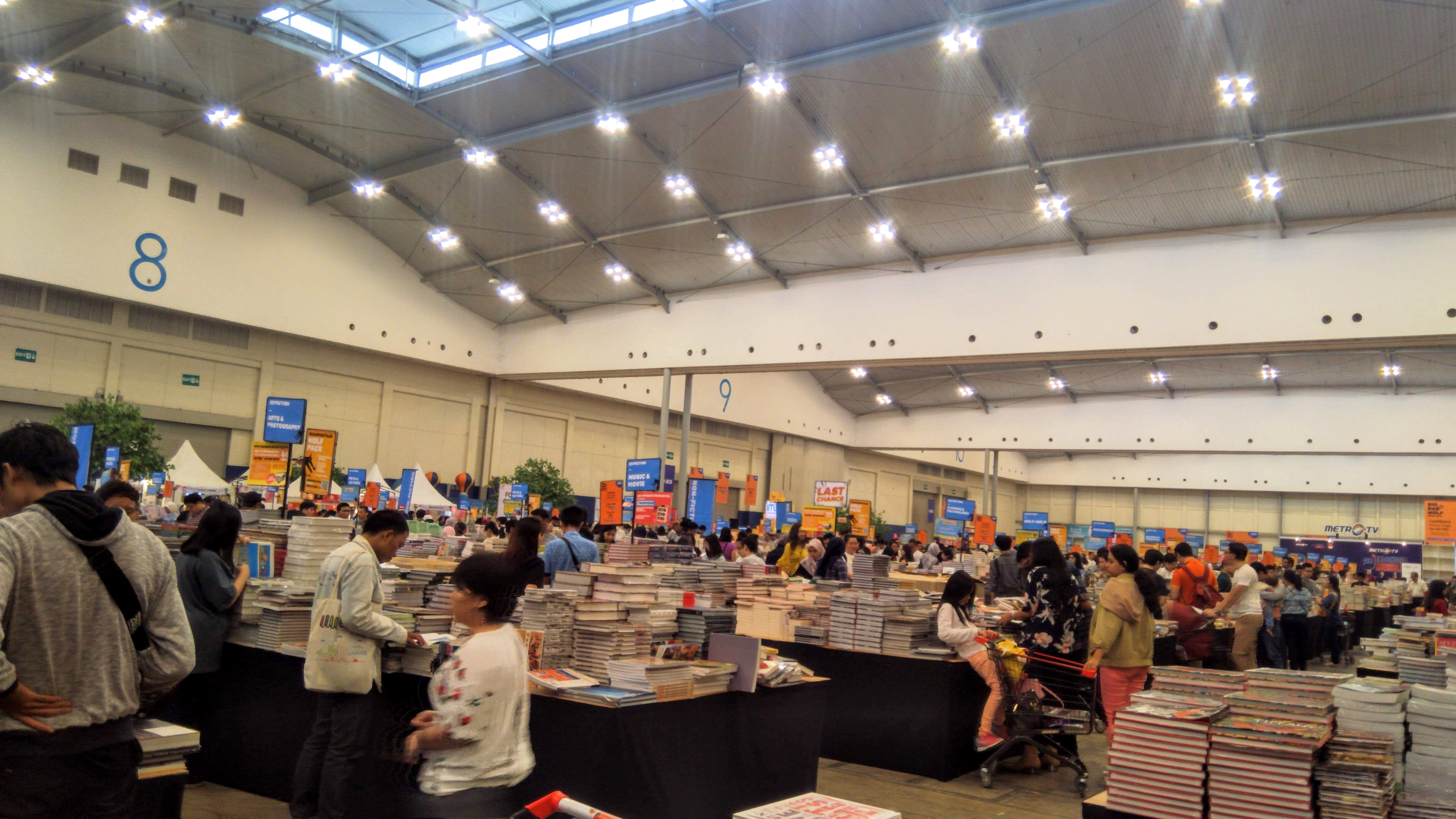
View of Big Bad Wolf Books Jakarta 2019

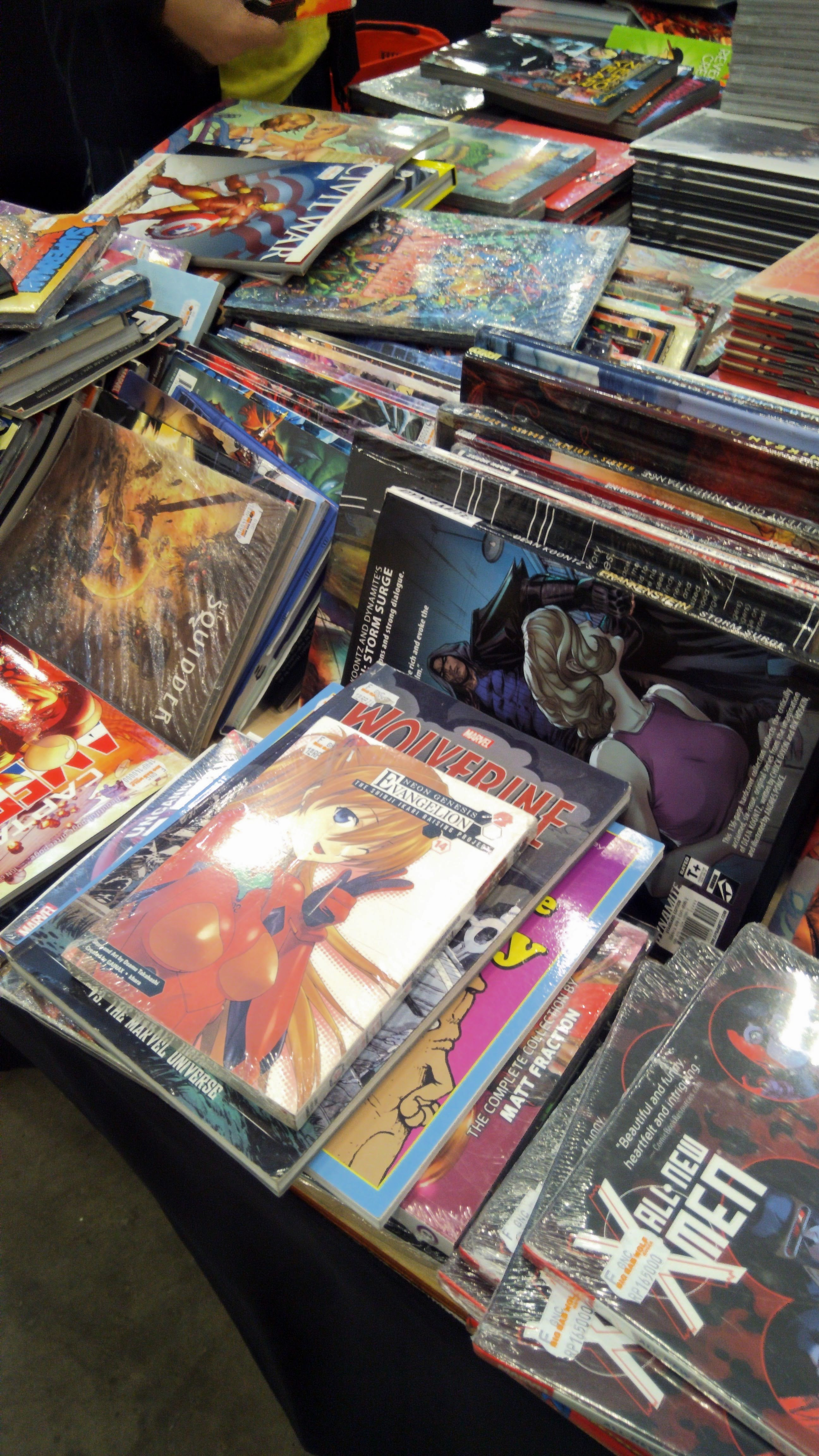
Manga and comic section at Big Bad Wolf Books Jakarta 2019

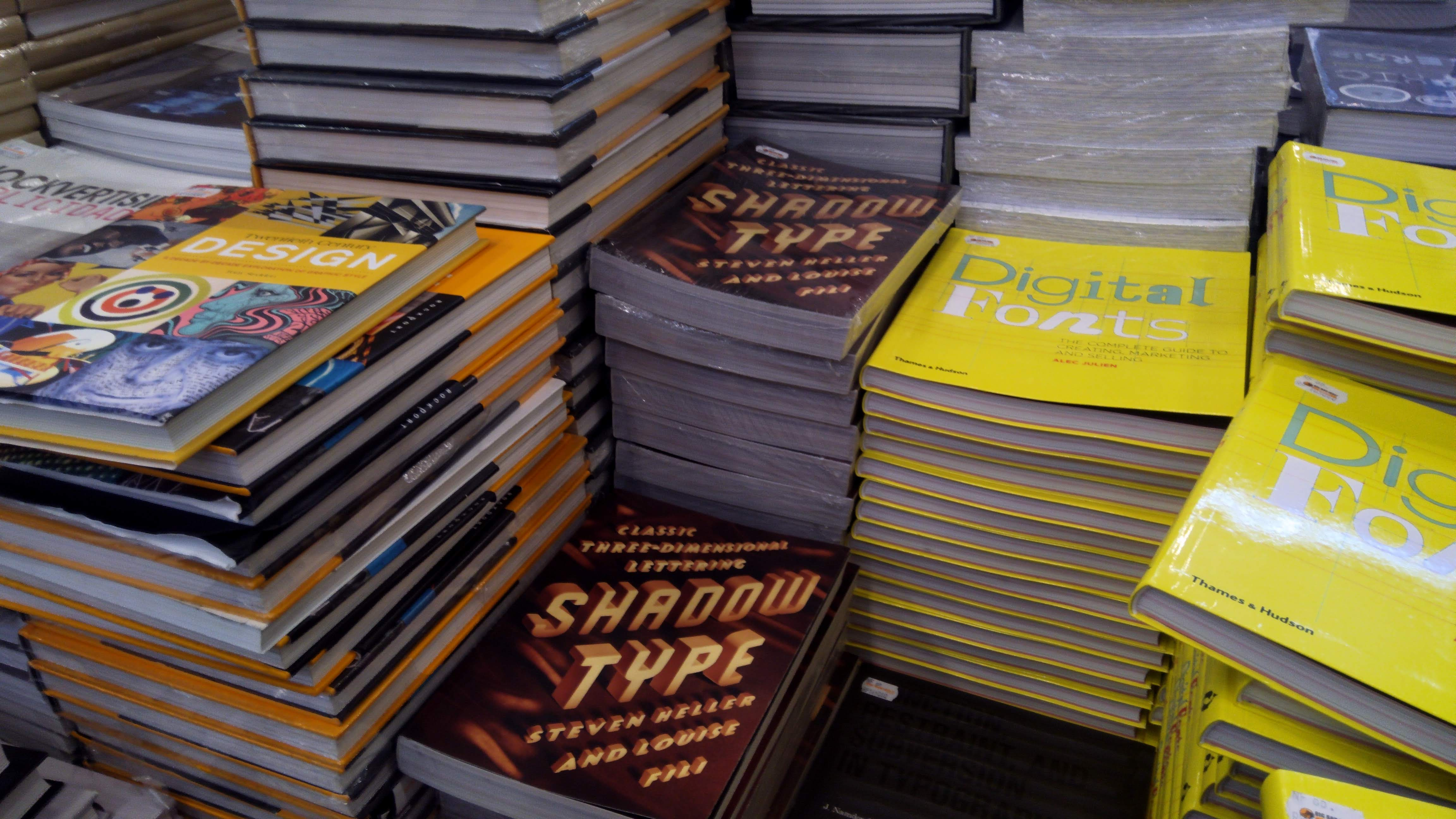
Graphic Design section at Big Bad Wolf Books Jakarta 2019

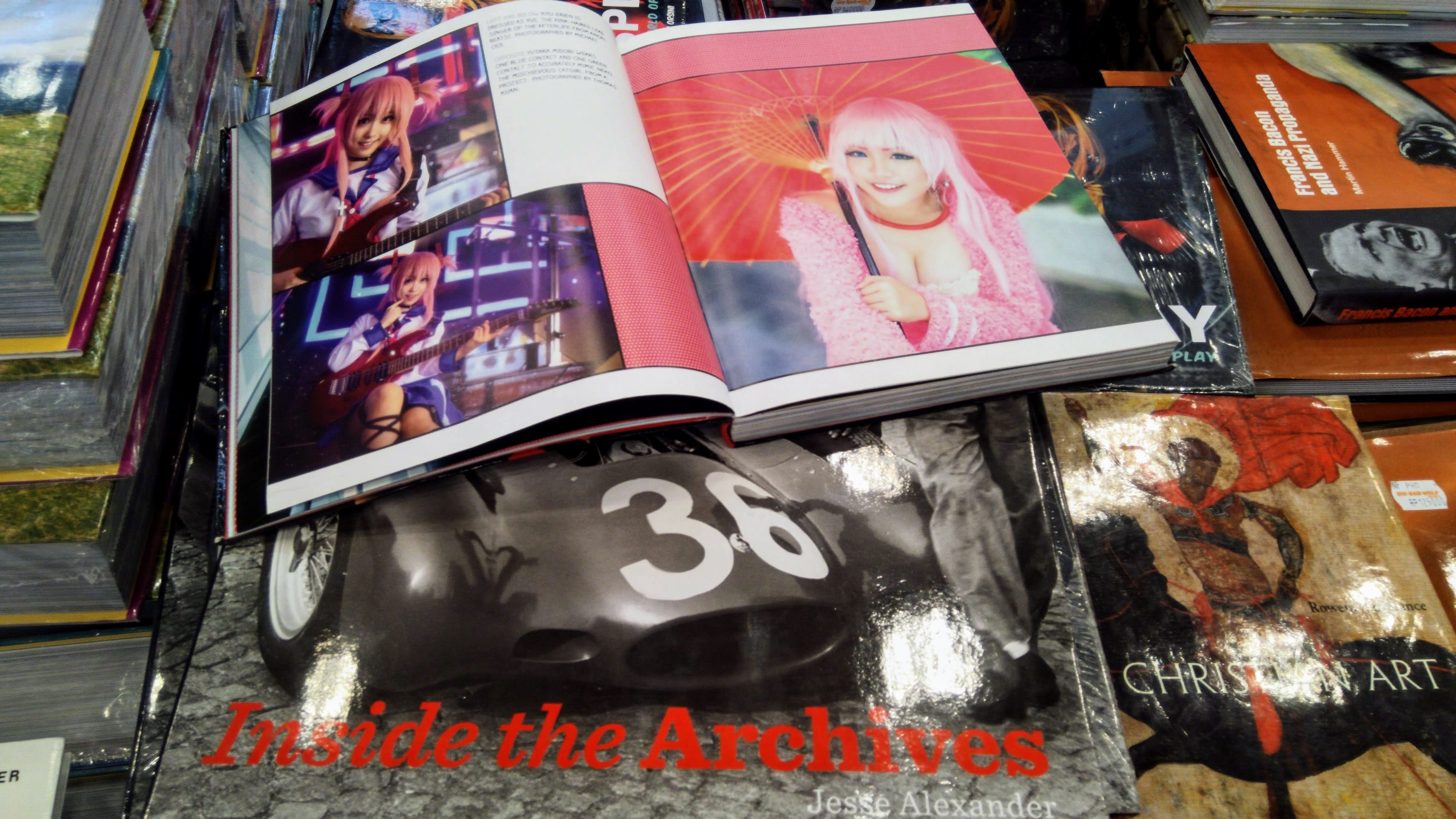
Photography section at Big Bad Wolf Books Jakarta 2019
