= Big Bad Wolf (disambiguation) =

Big Bad Wolf is a fictional wolf that appears in several precautionary folkloric stories.

Big Bad Wolf may also refer to:

== Fiction ==
- The Big Bad Wolf (Shrek), a fictional character in the Shrek movie series
- The Big Bad Wolf (1934 film), an animated short
- Big Bad Wolf (2006 film), a 2006 horror film
- Big Bad Wolves, a 2013 Israeli thriller-horror film
- The Big Bad Wolf (novel), the ninth book by James Patterson
- The Big Bad Wolf (2013 film), a 2013 French comedy by Nicolas Charlet and Bruno Lavaine, originally Le Grand Méchant Loup

== Music ==
- "Big Bad Wolf" (In This Moment song)
- "Big Bad Wolf", a 1965 single by Johnny "Guitar" Watson
- "Big Bad Wolf", a song by the band The Heavy
- "Big Bad Wolf" (Duck Sauce song), a 2011 song by Duck Sauce
- "The Big Bad Wolf", a song by I See Stars from the album 3-D
- "Big Bad Wolf", a song by Fifth Harmony, from the Japanese edition of the album 7/27
- "Big Bad Wolf", a song by Labrinth from the album Cosmic Opera: Act I

== Other ==
- Big Bad Wolf (roller coaster), a suspended roller coaster in the Oktoberfest section of Busch Gardens Williamsburg
- "Big Bad Wolf" (Hell on Wheels), a 2013 episode of the American television drama series Hell on Wheels
- Big Bad Wolf Books, a book fair held in Malaysia and Southeast Asia
- Big Bad Wolf (company), a French independent video game developer specialized into Narrative Role Playing Game (The Council)

== See also ==
- "Bad Wolf", a 2005 episode of the British science fiction television series Doctor Who
