= SM Seaside Cebu Arena =

Indoor arena in Cebu City, Philippines

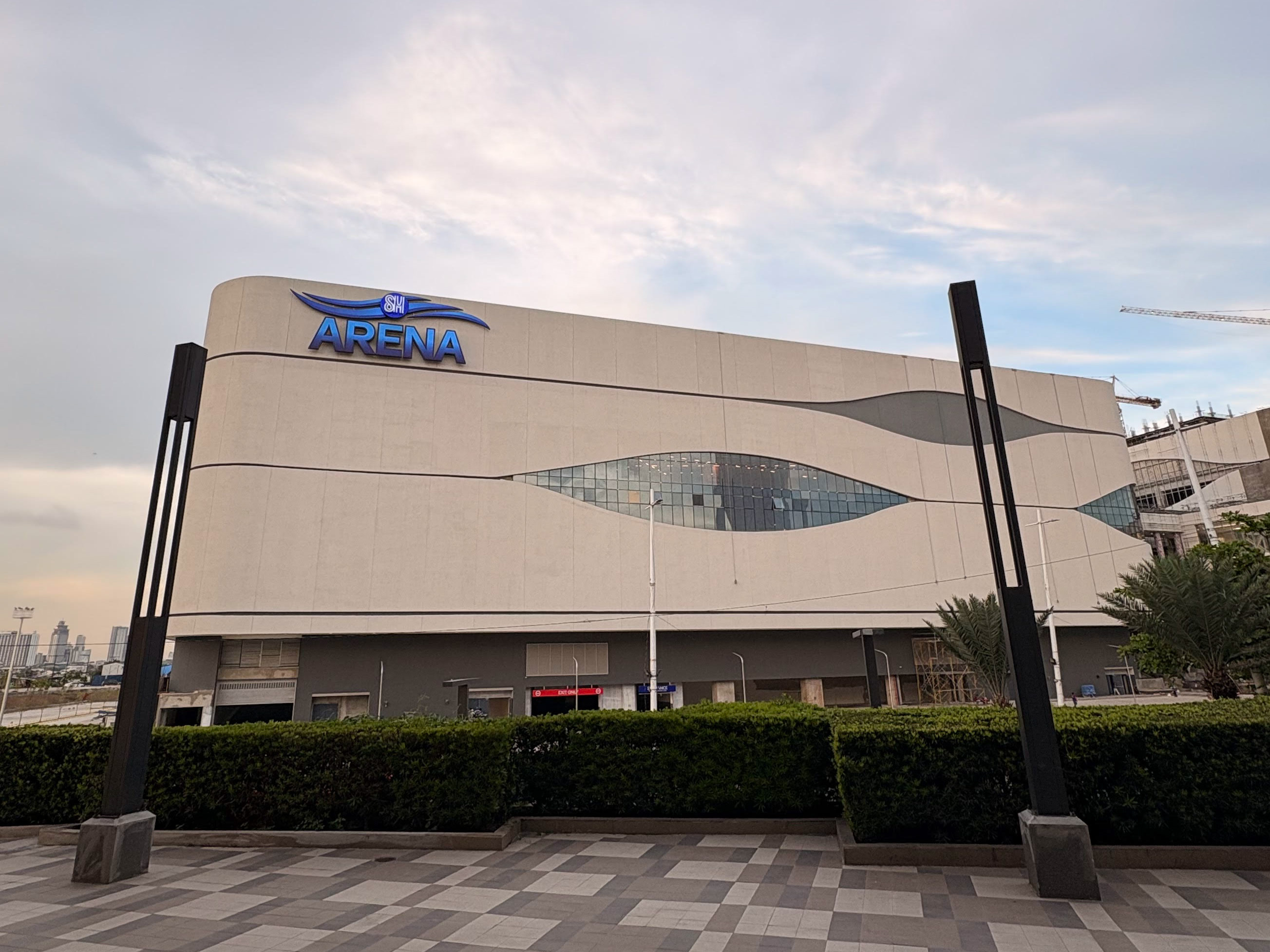
- SM Seaside Cebu Arena in June 2026
- Interactive map of SM Seaside Cebu Arena
- Address: South Coast City, South Road Properties; Cebu City; Philippines
- Location: Cebu City, Philippines
- Coordinates: 10°17′02″N 123°52′58″E
- Owner: SM Prime Holdings
- Operator: SM Prime Holdings
- Capacity: 16,000 (seating); 25,000 (full capacity)
- Executive suites: 30
- Type: Indoor arena

Construction
- Groundbreaking: 2021
- Opened: July 11, 2026; 4 months ago
- Cost: ₱7 billion
- Architect: Arquitectonica

Tenants
- Abra Weavers (EASL) (2026–present); PVL (2026–present)

Website
- www.sm-arena.com/CEBU

SM Seaside Cebu Arena is a multipurpose indoor arena in South Road Properties, Cebu City, Philippines. The arena, located adjacent to the SM Seaside City complex, has a seating capacity of 16,000, and a full capacity of 25,000, making it the largest indoor arena in the Visayas.

== History ==
=== Conception and initial cancellation ===
First proposed in 2013, SM Seaside Cebu Arena (then known as the "SM Seaside Arena") is planned to be a venue for local and international concerts, sports events, international conventions, and as the venue of the Cebu Schools Athletic Foundation, Inc. (CESAFI) and some select Philippine Basketball Association (PBA) games. The arena was also one of the proposed venues for the unsuccessful Philippine bid for the 2019 FIBA Basketball World Cup.

In January 2017, reports emerged that developer SM Prime Holdings had canceled its plans to build the arena. This occurred amidst an unfavorable political climate when Cebu City mayor Tomas Osmeña threatened to revoke several sale lots in the South Road Properties (SRP).

=== Revival and construction ===
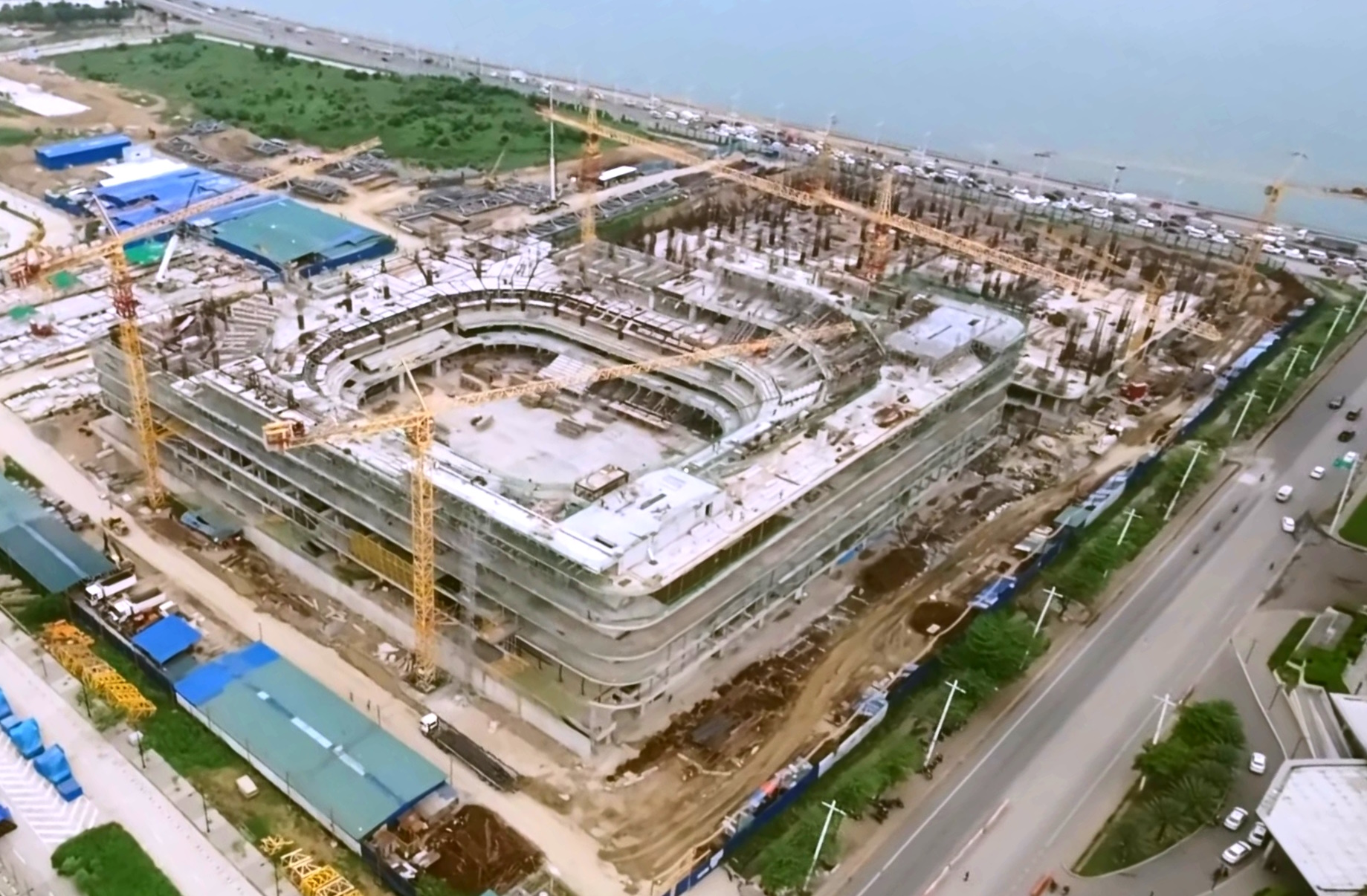
Construction of the arena; August 2024

The project was revived in late 2019 during the administration of Cebu City Mayor Edgardo Labella, with the arena, instead of being within the SM Seaside complex, now placed within South Coast City, an adjacent mixed-use development co-owned by SM Prime with Ayala Land.

The SM Seaside Cebu Arena officially broke ground in 2021. It was originally set to open in June 2026.

=== Opening and operations ===
The SM Seaside Cebu Arena officially opened on July 11, 2026, with the Cebu stop of Bini's Signals World Tour 2026 being the venue's first ever event. It has established itself as a venue for sporting and entertainment events in Cebu.

However, a 1.4-meter (4.6 ft) piece steel fell off from the roofing during the sound check procedures for LANY's Cebu stop of the Soft World Tour on November 12, 2026 leading to the cancellation of the concert.

== Events ==
=== Entertainment ===
In 2026, Filipino girl group BINI were the first performers at the arena on July 11, for the second leg of their Signals World Tour, and the arena's first event. Rock band IV of Spades also performed at the arena on July 18 as part of their 'Andalucia' Tour, as well as KZ Tandingan and TJ Monterde on September 5, and Yeng Constantino on September 20 as part of her 'Biyaheng Bente' 20th Anniversary concert tour.

Australian contemporary worship music band Hillsong Worship were the venue's first international performers as part of their Asia Tour on September 18. American pop rock band LANY performed at the arena as part of their Soft World Tour on November 6 but their November 12 concert cancelled due to the roof falling 4 foot steel debris. The concert was labeled postponed, but 2 hours after the announcement, it is now cancelled and ticket refunding is in process.

In 2027, Folk-pop band Ben&Ben announced in their "Sarrangola: The Concert" leg of Araneta, they will be performing at the arena for the second run of their Saranggola: The Concert on April 10.

Girl group Katseye will perform at the venue on February 7, as part of the Wildworld Tour.

=== Sports ===
The East Asia Super League's 'EASL Tip-Off', which served as the opening of its 2026–27 season, was the first professional sports event at the SM Seaside Cebu Arena, featuring Macau Hou Chon which played the Taipei Fubon Braves, and the Abra Weavers hosting Hong Kong Eastern.

The arena will host the 2027 FIBA Women's Asia Cup and the 2027 FIVB Women's Volleyball Nations League. It was originally set to host the second week of the 2026 VNL tournament, but was moved to the Philsports Arena in Pasig owing to the arena not being completed in time. It is currently being eyed as a venue for the opening and closing ceremonies of the 2028 Asian Beach Games. The Philippines men's national basketball team will also play in the arena for the sixth and final window of the 2027 FIBA Basketball World Cup Asian Qualifiers in late February and early March 2027.

In addition, the Philippine Basketball Association (PBA) and the Cebu Schools Athletic Foundation, Inc. (CESAFI) have also expressed interest in holding games in the arena.

== Facilities ==
SM Seaside Cebu Arena was built at the cost of ₱7 billion and was designed by Arquitectonica. It is bigger than 15,000-seater SM Mall of Asia Arena with a seating capacity of 16,000 and a full house capacity of 25,000This makes it among the largest indoor arenas in the Philippines. It was built on a 19,000-square-meter (200,000 sq ft) lot with about 70,000 square meters (750,000 sq ft) of gross floor area. It is also linked to the SMX Convention Center Cebu and the SM Seaside City shopping mall via a skybridge.

== Attendance records ==
Type	Event	Attendance	Date	Ref.
Volleyball	2026–27 Premier Volleyball League All-Filipino Conference: Creamline Cool Smashers vs. Akari Chargers	19,106	October 10, 2026	

== See also ==
- SM Seaside City
- SM Arena Mall of Asia
- Cebu Coliseum
- List of indoor arenas in the Philippines
