= SM Arena =

SM Arena may refer to two arenas in the Philippines, both owned by SM Prime Holdings:

- SM Mall of Asia Arena, Pasay, Metro Manila
- SM Seaside Cebu Arena, Cebu City
