= 2026–27 East Asia Super League =

Season of a basketball league

East Asia Super League
- Season: 2026–27
- Duration: 3 October 2026 – 28 March 2027
- Teams: 12

Seasons
- ← 2025–26 2027–28 →

The 2026–27 East Asia Super League is the fourth regular season of the East Asia Super League, an international basketball club competition involving teams from Hong Kong, Japan, Macau, Mongolia, South Korea, Philippines and Taiwan. The season will begin on 3 October 2026 and end on 28 March 2027.

== Teams ==
=== Allocation ===
The 2026–27 East Asia Super League will feature twelve teams.

Taiwan's (Chinese Taipei) P. League+ (PLG), Japan's B.League and South Korea's Korean Basketball League (KBL) each have two slots allocated for the finalists of their respective leagues. Mongolia's The League has one slot allocated for the champion of the league. Japan's B.League has the third slot allocated for the champion of the Emperor's Cup. On 26 May 2026, a third slot was given to the PLG, allocated for the playoffs of the PLG.

Continuing from the previous season, Hong Kong and Macau each have one slot. On 10 July, the EASL announced that the Hong Kong Eastern would return as the representative for Hong Kong. On 13 July, the EASL announced that the Macau Hou Chon would be the representative for Macau.

The Philippine Basketball Association (PBA), due to its multi-tournament format, was expected to select one of its teams to compete as the Philippines' representatives. However on 19 August, the EASL announced that the Maharlika Pilipinas Basketball League (MPBL) is the EASL's new partner and its champions were sent instead. The PBA withdrew allegedly over non-remittance of dues related to the Meralco Bolts participation in the previous season.

League	Country or region	Berths
P. League+	Chinese Taipei (Note: Taiwan, officially Republic of China. The organizers of the EASL and FIBA uses the designation of "Chinese Taipei".)	3
B.League	Japan	3
Korean Basketball League	South Korea	2
The League	Mongolia	1
Maharlika Pilipinas Basketball League	Philippines	1
Others	Hong Kong	1
Others	Macau	1

==== Qualified teams ====
Team	Domestic league standing
(Chinese Taipei) Taoyuan Pauian Pilots	2025–26 P. League+ champion
(Chinese Taipei) Taipei Fubon Braves	2025–26 P. League+ runner-up
(Chinese Taipei) TSG GhostHawks	2025–26 P. League+ third place
(Japan) Nagasaki Velca	2025–26 B.League champion
(Japan) Ryukyu Golden Kings	2025–26 B.League runner-up
(Japan) Alvark Tokyo	2026 Emperor’s Cup champion
(South Korea) Busan KCC Egis	2025–26 Korean Basketball League champion
(South Korea) Goyang Sono Skygunners	2025–26 Korean Basketball League runner-up
(Mongolia) South Gobi Broncos	2025–26 The League champion
(Philippines) Abra Weavers	2025 Maharlika Pilipinas Basketball League champion
Hong Kong Eastern	2025–26 Hong Kong A1 Division Championship champion
Macau Hou Chon	2026 All-Macau Basketball Silver Medal League champion

=== Foreign and heritage players ===
The EASL allows a maximum of two foreign players or imports. Additionally teams are allowed to have one additional heritage and naturalized player.

Club	Imports		Asian heritage player	Naturalized player	Former players
(Chinese Taipei) Taoyuan Pauian Pilots	(United States) Dewan Hernandez	(United States) Javan Johnson	—N/a	(Senegal) Amdy Dieng	—N/a
(Chinese Taipei) Taipei Fubon Braves	(United States) Jamorko Pickett	(Montenegro) Marko Todorović	—N/a	(Senegal) Mouhamed Mbaye	(United States) Jonathan Nchekwube
(Chinese Taipei) TSG GhostHawks	(Czech Republic) Ondřej Balvín	(United States) Jordan Caroline	(Mongolia) Delgerchuluun Bayasgalan	(Nigeria) Daniel Oli	(United States) De'Mon Brooks
(Japan) Nagasaki Velca	(Spain) Pablo Aguilar	(United States) Levi Randolph	—N/a	—N/a	(United States) Jarrell Brantley
(Japan) Ryukyu Golden Kings	(United States) Jack Cooley	(United States) David Nwaba	(Philippines) Kiefer Ravena	—N/a	—N/a
(Japan) Alvark Tokyo	(United States) D. J. Hogg	(United States) DeJon Jarreau	—N/a	(United States) Ryan Rossiter	(United States) Keyontae Johnson
(South Korea) Busan KCC Egis	(United States) Louis King	(United States) Shawn Long	—N/a	—N/a	—N/a
(South Korea) Goyang Sono Skygunners	(United States) Scottie James	(United States) Johnny O'Bryant III	(Philippines) Kevin Quiambao	—N/a	—N/a
(Mongolia) South Gobi Broncos	(United Kingdom) Kavell Bigby-Williams	(United States) Earl Clark	(Thailand) Freddie Lish	—N/a	—N/a
(Philippines) Abra Weavers	(United States) Micheal Eric	(United States) Jaylen Johnson	(Jordan) Freddy Ibrahim	(Senegal) Malick Diouf	—N/a
Hong Kong Eastern	(United States) Carlton Linguard	(United States) Akili Vining	(Kazakhstan) Robert Pan	—N/a	(Lithuania) Egidijus Mockevičius
Macau Hou Chon	(United States) Davon Dillard	(United States) Markell Hood	(Australia) Dillon Stith	—N/a	(India) Princepal Singh

== Group stage ==
The twelve teams were drawn into three groups of four teams each for the group stage. The top two teams from each group advanced to postseason. The top two overall seeds received a bye.

The EASL Tip-Off is scheduled for 3 October 2026 at SM Seaside Cebu Arena in Cebu City, Philippines. Macau Hou Chon will play against the Taipei Fubon Braves in the first game while the Abra Weavers will host Hong Kong Eastern in the second.

=== Group A ===
Pos	Team	Pld	W	L	PF	PA	PD	PCT	Qualification
1	(South Korea) Goyang Sono Skygunners	1	1	0	99	94	+5	1.000	Advance to finals
2	(Chinese Taipei) TSG GhostHawks	2	1	1	184	184	0	.500	Advance to finals
3	(Japan) Alvark Tokyo	2	1	1	198	168	+30	.500	
4	(Mongolia) South Gobi Broncos	1	0	1	78	113	−35	.000	

Updated to match(es) played on 4 November 2026. Source: EASL

14 October 2026	Alvark Tokyo (Japan)	113–78	(Mongolia) South Gobi Broncos	Tachikawa
19:10 (JST)	Scoring by quarter: 35–13, 12–13, 26–31, 40–21
	Pts: Johnson 33; Rebs: Baranski, Hogg 9 Asts: Johnson, Rossiter 6	Boxscore	Pts: Barsbold 22; Rebs: Bigby-Williams 12; Asts: Barsbold 7	Arena: Arena Tachikawa Tachihi

21 October 2026	TSG GhostHawks (Chinese Taipei)	94–99(OT)	(South Korea) Goyang Sono Skygunners	Kaohsiung
19:10 (TST)	Scoring by quarter: 23–14, 33–25, 21–27, 14–25, Overtime: 3–8
	Pts: Balvín 24; Rebs: Balvín 9 Asts: Balvín 5	Boxscore	Pts: O'Bryant 42; Rebs: James 15; Asts: Lee Ju. 9	Arena: Fengshan Arena

4 November 2026	TSG GhostHawks (Chinese Taipei)	90–85	(Japan) Alvark Tokyo	Kaohsiung
19:10 (TST)	Scoring by quarter: 15–17, 17–23, 27–28, 31–17
	Pts: Caroline 25; Rebs: Balvín 15; Asts: Ku Mao 6	Boxscore	Pts: Jarreau 26; Rebs: Jarreau 5 Asts: Rossiter 7	Arena: Fengshan Arena

18 November 2026	Goyang Sono Skygunners (South Korea)	vs.	(Mongolia) South Gobi Broncos	Goyang
19:10 (KST)	Scoring by quarter: –, –, –, –
		Boxscore		Arena: Goyang Sono Arena

9 December 2026	Goyang Sono Skygunners (South Korea)	vs.	(Japan) Alvark Tokyo	Goyang
19:10 (KST)	Scoring by quarter: –, –, –, –
		Boxscore		Arena: Goyang Sono Arena

15 December 2026	Goyang Sono Skygunners (South Korea)	vs.	(Chinese Taipei) TSG GhostHawks	Goyang
19:10 (KST)	Scoring by quarter: –, –, –, –
		Boxscore		Arena: Goyang Sono Arena

23 December 2026	South Gobi Broncos (Mongolia)	vs.	(Japan) Alvark Tokyo	Ulaanbaatar
19:10 (ULAT)	Scoring by quarter: –, –, –, –
		Boxscore		Arena: M Bank Arena

6 January 2027	TSG GhostHawks (Chinese Taipei)	vs.	(Mongolia) South Gobi Broncos	Kaohsiung
19:10 (TST)	Scoring by quarter: –, –, –, –
		Boxscore		Arena: Fengshan Arena

13 January 2027	Alvark Tokyo (Japan)	vs.	(Chinese Taipei) TSG GhostHawks	Tachikawa
19:10 (JST)	Scoring by quarter: –, –, –, –
		Boxscore		Arena: Arena Tachikawa Tachihi

20 January 2027	Alvark Tokyo (Japan)	vs.	(South Korea) Goyang Sono Skygunners	Tachikawa
19:10 (JST)	Scoring by quarter: –, –, –, –
		Boxscore		Arena: Arena Tachikawa Tachihi

3 February 2027	South Gobi Broncos (Mongolia)	vs.	(South Korea) Goyang Sono Skygunners	Ulaanbaatar
19:10 (ULAT)	Scoring by quarter: –, –, –, –
		Boxscore		Arena: M Bank Arena

5 February 2027	South Gobi Broncos (Mongolia)	vs.	(Chinese Taipei) TSG GhostHawks	Ulaanbaatar
19:10 (ULAT)	Scoring by quarter: –, –, –, –
		Boxscore		Arena: M Bank Arena

=== Group B ===
Pos	Team	Pld	W	L	PF	PA	PD	PCT	Qualification
1	(South Korea) Busan KCC Egis	3	3	0	294	257	+37	1.000	Advance to finals
2	(Chinese Taipei) Taipei Fubon Braves	2	1	1	183	177	+6	.500	Advance to finals
3	(Japan) Nagasaki Velca	2	1	1	180	174	+6	.500	
4	Macau Hou Chon	3	0	3	259	308	−49	.000	

Updated to match(es) played on 11 November 2026. Source: EASL

3 October 2026	Macau Hou Chon	89–103	(Chinese Taipei) Taipei Fubon Braves	Cebu City, Philippines
16:00 (PST)	Scoring by quarter: 21–28, 17–26, 25–28, 26–21
	Pts: Shackelford 23; Rebs: Shackelford 7 Asts: Shackelford 7	Report	Pts: Todorović 30; Rebs: Todorović 17; Asts: Chen Y. 10	Arena: SM Seaside Cebu Arena

14 October 2026	Nagasaki Velca (Japan)	83–98	(South Korea) Busan KCC Egis	Nagasaki
19:00 (JST)	Scoring by quarter: 16–26, 27–17, 27–28, 13–27
	Pts: Baba, Randolph 16; Rebs: Baba 6 Asts: Nagano 10	Boxscore	Pts: King 44; Rebs: Long 17; Asts: Heo H., King 7	Arena: Happiness Arena

28 October 2026	Macau Hou Chon	76–97	(Japan) Nagasaki Velca	Macau
20:00 (MST)	Scoring by quarter: 21–30, 25–25, 15–14, 15–28
	Pts: Dillard 20; Rebs: Dillard 9 Asts: Dillard 5	Boxscore	Pts: Morikawa 22; Rebs: Aguilar 16; Asts: Nagano 4	Arena: Tap Seac Multi-sports Pavilion

5 November 2026	Busan KCC Egis (South Korea)	108–94	Macau Hou Chon	Busan
19:00 (KST)	Scoring by quarter: 35–25, 24–26, 23–19, 26–24
	Pts: King, Long 34; Rebs: Long 20; Asts: Heo U. 11	Boxscore	Pts: Stith 30; Rebs: Dillard 8 Asts: Shackelford 10	Arena: Sajik Arena

11 November 2026	Busan KCC Egis (South Korea)	88–80	(Chinese Taipei) Taipei Fubon Braves	Busan
19:00 (KST)	Scoring by quarter: 26–20, 13–26, 24–15, 25–19
	Pts: King 27; Rebs: King, Long 12; Asts: Heo H. 6	Boxscore	Pts: Todorović 25; Rebs: Todorović 19; Asts: three players 4	Arena: Sajik Arena

9 December 2026	Taipei Fubon Braves (Chinese Taipei)	vs.	(Japan) Nagasaki Velca	Taipei
19:00 (TST)	Scoring by quarter: –, –, –, –
		Boxscore		Arena: Taipei Heping Basketball Gymnasium

12 December 2026	Taipei Fubon Braves (Chinese Taipei)	vs.	Macau Hou Chon	Taipei
17:00 (TST)	Scoring by quarter: –, –, –, –
		Boxscore		Arena: Taipei Heping Basketball Gymnasium

23 December 2026	Nagasaki Velca (Japan)	vs.	(Chinese Taipei) Taipei Fubon Braves	Nagasaki
19:00 (JST)	Scoring by quarter: –, –, –, –
		Boxscore		Arena: Happiness Arena

29 December 2026	Macau Hou Chon	vs.	(South Korea) Busan KCC Egis	TBD
20:00 (MST)	Scoring by quarter: –, –, –, –
		Boxscore		Arena: TBD

13 January 2027	Busan KCC Egis (South Korea)	vs.	(Japan) Nagasaki Velca	Busan
19:00 (KST)	Scoring by quarter: –, –, –, –
		Boxscore		Arena: Sajik Arena

20 January 2027	Nagasaki Velca (Japan)	vs.	Macau Hou Chon	Nagasaki
19:00 (JST)	Scoring by quarter: –, –, –, –
		Boxscore		Arena: Happiness Arena

27 January 2027	Taipei Fubon Braves (Chinese Taipei)	vs.	(South Korea) Busan KCC Egis	Taipei
19:00 (TST)	Scoring by quarter: –, –, –, –
		Boxscore		Arena: Taipei Heping Basketball Gymnasium

=== Group C ===
Pos	Team	Pld	W	L	PF	PA	PD	PCT	Qualification
1	(Philippines) Abra Weavers	1	1	0	79	72	+7	1.000	Advance to finals
2	Hong Kong Eastern	2	1	1	176	175	+1	.500	Advance to finals
3	(Japan) Ryukyu Golden Kings	2	1	1	199	201	−2	.500	
4	(Chinese Taipei) Taoyuan Pauian Pilots	1	0	1	97	103	−6	.000	

Updated to match(es) played on 4 November 2026. Source: EASL

3 October 2026	Abra Weavers (Philippines)	79–72	Hong Kong Eastern	Cebu City
19:00 (PST)	Scoring by quarter: 20–17, 18–14, 18–18, 23–23
	Pts: Ibrahim, Johnson 14; Rebs: Diouf 12; Asts: Johnson 4	Boxscore	Pts: Vining 26; Rebs: Mockevičius 11; Asts: Vining 8	Arena: SM Seaside Cebu Arena

28 October 2026	Taoyuan Pauian Pilots (Chinese Taipei)	97–103	(Japan) Ryukyu Golden Kings	Taoyuan
19:00 (TST)	Scoring by quarter: 21–28, 24–25, 27–23, 25–27
	Pts: Lu 20; Rebs: Hernandez 9 Asts: three players 3	Boxscore	Pts: Oura 20; Rebs: Cooley 10; Asts: Oura 7	Arena: Taoyuan Arena

4 November 2026	Ryukyu Golden Kings (Japan)	96–104	Hong Kong Eastern	Okinawa
19:30 (JST)	Scoring by quarter: 19–23, 25–35, 22–28, 30–18
	Pts: Cooley 26; Rebs: Cooley 15; Asts: Oura 8	Boxscore	Pts: Vining 25; Rebs: Pan 10; Asts: Vining 14	Arena: Okinawa Arena

9 December 2026	Ryukyu Golden Kings (Japan)	vs.	(Philippines) Abra Weavers	Okinawa
19:30 (JST)	Scoring by quarter: –, –, –, –
		Boxscore		Arena: Okinawa Arena

23 December 2026	Hong Kong Eastern	vs.	(Japan) Ryukyu Golden Kings	TBD
20:00 (HKT)	Scoring by quarter: –, –, –, –
		Boxscore		Arena: TBD

26 December 2026	Hong Kong Eastern	vs.	(Chinese Taipei) Taoyuan Pauian Pilots	TBD
16:00 (HKT)	Scoring by quarter: –, –, –, –
		Boxscore		Arena: TBD

30 December 2026	Taoyuan Pauian Pilots (Chinese Taipei)	vs.	(Philippines) Abra Weavers	Taoyuan
19:00 (TST)	Scoring by quarter: –, –, –, –
		Boxscore		Arena: Taoyuan Arena

3 January 2027	Taoyuan Pauian Pilots (Chinese Taipei)	vs.	Hong Kong Eastern	Taoyuan
17:00 (TST)	Scoring by quarter: –, –, –, –
		Boxscore		Arena: Taoyuan Arena

13 January 2027	Abra Weavers (Philippines)	vs.	(Japan) Ryukyu Golden Kings	TBD
19:00 (PST)	Scoring by quarter: –, –, –, –
		Boxscore		Arena: TBD

20 January 2027	Ryukyu Golden Kings (Japan)	vs.	(Chinese Taipei) Taoyuan Pauian Pilots	Okinawa
19:30 (JST)	Scoring by quarter: –, –, –, –
		Boxscore		Arena: Okinawa Arena

30 January 2027	Abra Weavers (Philippines)	vs.	(Chinese Taipei) Taoyuan Pauian Pilots	Cebu City
19:00 (PST)	Scoring by quarter: –, –, –, –
		Boxscore		Arena: SM Seaside Cebu Arena

4 February 2027	Hong Kong Eastern	vs.	(Philippines) Abra Weavers	Hong Kong
19:00 (HKT)	Scoring by quarter: –, –, –, –
		Boxscore		Arena: Tsuen Wan Sports Centre

== Finals ==
Quarterfinals
(N/A)
(N/A)
(N/A)
(N/A)

Semifinals
(N/A)
(N/A)
(N/A)
(N/A)

Championship
(N/A)
(N/A)
Third place
(N/A)
(N/A)

=== Quarterfinals ===
3 March 2027
TBD

Boxscore

(N/A)	vs.	(N/A)
Scoring by quarter: –, –, –, –

TBD

9/10 March 2027
TBD

Boxscore

(N/A)	vs.	(N/A)
Scoring by quarter: –, –, –, –

TBD

=== Semifinals ===
26 March 2027
TBD

Boxscore

(N/A)	vs.	(N/A)
Scoring by quarter: –, –, –, –

TBD

26 March 2027
TBD

Boxscore

(N/A)	vs.	(N/A)
Scoring by quarter: –, –, –, –

TBD

=== Third place game ===
28 March 2027
TBD

Boxscore

(N/A)	vs.	(N/A)
Scoring by quarter: –, –, –, –

TBD

=== Championship game ===
28 March 2027
TBD

Boxscore

(N/A)	vs.	(N/A)
Scoring by quarter: –, –, –, –

TBD

== Qualification for 2027 Basketball Champions League Asia ==
The best-ranked EASL teams from Japan and Korea, and the best-ranked EASL team overall excluding teams from Japan and Korea would secure direct qualification to Basketball Champions League Asia (BCL Asia).

Team	Qualified on	Qualified as
(Japan)		2026–27 EASL Japan best-ranked team
(South Korea)		2026–27 EASL Korea best-ranked team
		2026–27 EASL best-ranked team overall excluding teams from Japan and Korea
