= Pico Far East Holdings Limited =

Asian event marketing company

- Type: Public
- Traded as: SEHK: 752
- Industry: Event marketing
- Founded: 1969
- Headquarters: Pico House, 4 Dai Fu Street, Tai Po Industrial Estate, N.T., Hong Kong, China
- Area served: Worldwide
- Key people: Lawrence Chia (Chairman)
- Services: Event marketing; Conference and exhibition management; Venue management; Interior and retail design; Visual identity; Themed environment and related business
- Revenue: US$640 million (2019)
- Total equity: US$520 million (2017)
- Number of employees: Around 2,500 (2019)

Pico Far East Holdings Limited is a Hong Kong event marketing company founded in 1969 by Chia Siong Lim, under the name Pico Art Studio. They focus on services related to planning and marketing for exhibitions, museums, corporate events and theme parks. The company's stock is listed on the Hong Kong Stock Exchange under the name Pico Far East Holdings Limited, the chairman of the group is Lawrence Chia. Their physical headquarters is Hong Kong, and they are legally domiciled in the Cayman Islands.

== History ==
Pico was founded in 1969, it is a global agency with some 2,500 staff in 35 offices located in major cities around the world. Pico is building large operations and production facilities in Beijing and Shanghai called Pico Creative Centres. There is a Pico Creative Centre in Singapore as well. The bulk of Pico's work has involved designing and building exhibition stands and managing and providing services at mega-events like World Expos or Olympic Games.

== Stock exchange ==
Pico has been listed on the Hong Kong Stock Exchange (SEHK: 0752) since 1992, and their associate Pico (Thailand) Public Company Limited has been listed on Thailand’s MAI (SET: PICO) since 2004.

== Subsidiaries and affiliates ==
Pico subsidiaries and affiliates:

=== Pico+ ===
Three subsidiaries of Pico are under the subsidiaries network Pico+:

- TBA Creative Network
  - TBA Creative Network is a brand activation agency. Focusing on below-the-line interactive marketing services, their business domain includes branding strategies, events, exhibition, conference, and experiential marketing.
- PLUS Communications
- PIXELS

Other Subsidiaries:

- Pico X
  - Pico X is Pico's strategic digital business unit, which provides digital strategy, business analytics and creative technology services.
- IMT
- P3 Innovation
- MP International (MPI)
- A.E. Smith
- World Image
- Epicentro
- Chenzhou International Convention and Exhibition Centre
- Sri Lanka Exhibition and Convention Centre
- Fairtrans International
- Global Spectrum Asia
- Local Projects
