= Sabah Trade Centre =

Trade and exhibition centre in Kota Kinabalu, Sabah, Malaysia

- Pusat Perdagangan Sabah
- Interactive map of the Sabah Trade Centre area

General information
- Type: Trade centre
- Location: Istiadat Road, Likas Bay, 88400, Kota Kinabalu, Sabah, Malaysia
- Coordinates: 5°59′28.0″N 116°05′30.5″E
- Owner: Sabah Trade and Industry Consultancy Sdn. Bhd. under the State Department of Industrial Development and Research, Ministry of Industrial Development of the Government of Sabah

Other information
- Parking: 400

Sabah Trade Centre (Malay: Pusat Perdagangan Sabah) is a trade centre building in Kota Kinabalu, Sabah, Malaysia. The building located at an approximately 100,000 square feet area reaching the height of 70 feet and divided into two levels. It is managed by Sabah Trade and Industry Consultancy Sdn. Bhd. (STIC), under the State Department of Industrial Development and Research, Ministry of Industrial Development of the Government of Sabah.

== Features ==
The first level of the building has 50,000 square feet usable space comprising the main exhibition hall, foyer, meeting rooms, office and preparation rooms while the second level has 35,000 square feet usable space consisting of permanent exhibition area, office space and cafeteria. The building is opened for booking of exhibitions, conferences, seminars and meetings.

== Events ==
The building became the centre of exhibition for the BIMP-EAGA between Brunei, Indonesia, Malaysia and the Philippines. In 2019, the country major book fair of Big Bad Wolf Books held a fair in the building.
