= Sri Lanka Exhibition and Convention Centre =

The Sri Lanka Exhibition and Convention Centre (SLECC) is a professional convention centre, located in Colombo. It provides a 3,700 square metres (40,000 sq ft) air-conditioned, multi-functional exhibition space for hosting events, trade-shows, seminars, conferences and meetings.

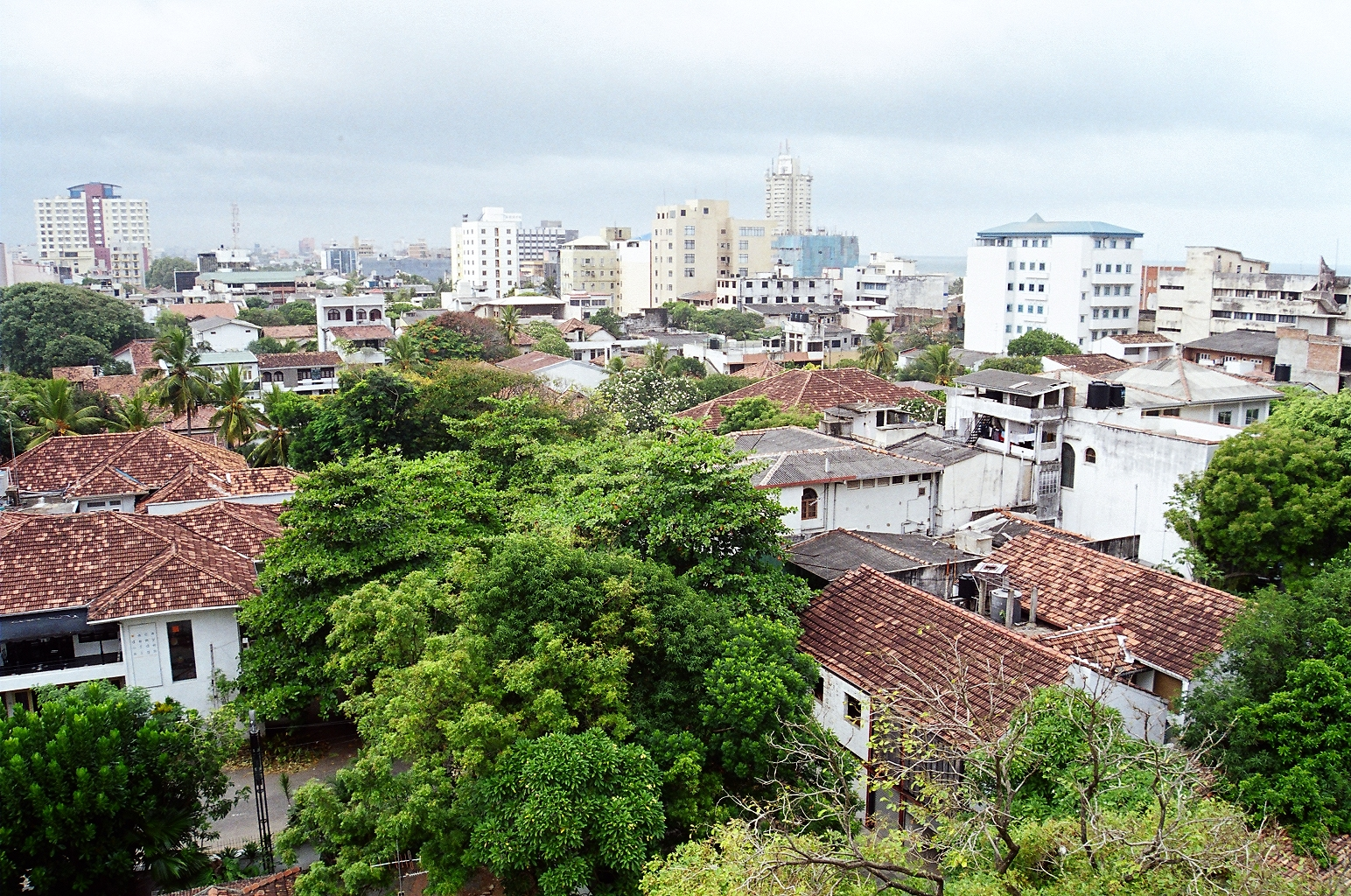
Colombo City

== History ==
The Sri Lanka Exhibition and Convention Centre started operation in 1994 under the approval of the Board of Investment (BOI). It is an investment project of the Pico Far East Holdings Limited to build exhibition and convention in Sri Lanka, which spearheaded by Sri Lanka Convention Bureau (SLCB) under the aegis of the Ministry of Tourism.

== Past Events ==
- Colombo International Yarn and Fabric Show (CIFS)
- EDEX Expo | Higher Educational Exhibition
- Hotel, Hospitality and Food Sri Lanka (HHF Asia)
- Saree Festival
