= SM Seaside City =

Shopping mall in Cebu City, Philippines

- An aerial view of SM Seaside City in 2024
- Location: Mambaling, Cebu City, Philippines
- Coordinates: 10°16′49.4″N 123°52′54.6″E
- Address: Cebu South Coastal Road cor. F. Vestil Street, South Road Properties, Brgy. Mambaling, Cebu City
- Opened: November 27, 2015; 10 years ago
- Previous names: SM Seaside City Cebu (2015–2022); SM Seaside City (2022–)
- Developer: SM Prime Holdings
- Manager: SM Prime Holdings
- Architect: WV Coscolluela & Associates; Arquitectonica (consultant); Wow Architects (interior designer)
- Num. of stores: 700+
- Num. of anchor tenants: 12
- Floor area: 407,000 m^{2} (4,380,000 sq ft)
- Floors: 5
- Parking: 4,336
- Public transit: 22B Mandaue; Cordova via CCLEX; Lapu-Lapu via CCLEX; CIBUS Il Corso, IT Park, Ayala Center Cebu; MyBus Anjo World, SM City Cebu, Parkmall
- Website: SM Seaside City

SM Seaside City, also known locally as SM Seaside and formerly but still officially known on exterior signage as SM Seaside City Cebu, is a large shopping mall owned and developed by SM Prime Holdings in South Road Properties, Cebu City, Philippines. The mall opened on November 27, 2015, exactly 22 years after SM City Cebu, another mall also owned by SM Prime in Cebu City, opened in 1993.

As of 2025, it is the largest mall in Cebu, the fourth largest shopping mall in the Philippines and the nineteenth in the world, with a gross floor area (GFA) of approximately 407,000 square meters. SM Seaside is SM Prime Holdings' third mall in Metro Cebu and its 56th mall in the Philippines. The mall is designed by Arquitectonica, the same company which designed other SM Supermalls, such as SM North EDSA, SM Mall of Asia, and SM Megamall.

== History ==
Plans for a second SM Supermall in Cebu were already in place as early as 2007, with the Cebu City government-owned South Road Properties seen as a potential location. In 2009, SM Prime Holdings formally submitted an offer to acquire 28 hectares of land in the South Road Properties, with plans to develop a mall and other mixed-use developments for ₱20 billion over 15 years, with the purchase formally approved by the Cebu City government in 2010.

On April 12, 2011, SM Prime held a ground-breaking ceremony at the mall's location, located at the corner of F. Vestil Street and the Cebu South Coastal Road.

Months before the mall's opening, SM Prime Holdings President Hans Sy stated adjustments for the project, in terms of budget allocation to ₱8.5 billion, from the original budget of ₱6 billion, and the whole SM Seaside Complex now estimating to cost ₱30 billion. It is SM's largest and most expensive mall ever built in a single construction phase until the completion of SM City Tianjin in China.

On November 27, 2015, SM Seaside City opened to great fanfare, and causing major traffic congestion in the South Road Properties area, particularly along the Cebu South Coastal Road. On that evening, a fireworks display was held to celebrate the opening of the mall, which would be the largest in Cebu.

== Features ==
SM Seaside City, ground level view

SM Seaside City is a circular-shaped retail mall with multiple anchors, including a two-story SM Store (formerly The SM Store), SM Supermarket, a Centerstage theater, a Super Screen Cinema (formerly Large Screen format cinema), two Director's Club cinemas, and 4 regular cinemas, an 18-lane SM Bowling and Amusement Center, and an Olympic-size ice skating rink near the food court.

=== Super Screen Cinema ===
The Super Screen Cinema features a screen almost 30% larger than the regular cinema screen size using a Christie 6P laser projection system and a SM Large Screen Cinema using Dolby Atmos Sound System. The cinema contains 351 seats. The technology in this cinema is similar to Dolby Cinema, which also uses Christie projectors.

=== SMX Convention Center ===
The proposed SMX Convention Center Cebu will stand on the property of South Coast City, an adjacent mixed-use development co-owned by SM Prime with Ayala Land.

=== Seaside Tower ===
This 169-meter tall tower is located on the center of the mall. There are plans for restaurants, coffee shops and a viewing deck at the top of the tower which will provide people with a 360-degree view of Cebu City and the mall. The tower is still currently unoccupied. The tower is supported by columns of 150 cm x 150 cm dimensions of 21 MPA concrete ultimate compression strength from the foundation up to the third level.

== Other projects ==
=== SM Seaside Cebu Arena ===
The SM Seaside Cebu Arena is a 16,000-seating capacity indoor arena intended to be built across the shopping mall complex. It is planned to house international concerts and events. It is the biggest indoor arena in Cebu.

It is planned to become a venue for the Cebu Schools Athletic Foundation, Inc. (CESAFI) and the Philippine Basketball Association (PBA) and was one of the planned venues for the 2019 FIBA Basketball World Cup, had the Philippines won its bid to host the tournament.

In January 2017, SM Prime Holdings reportedly canceled its plans to build the arena. However, plans for the arena resumed in late 2019, with the arena, instead of being within the SM Seaside complex, now placed in the South Coast City. It was originally set to open in June 2026, but is opened on July 11, 2026.

== Gallery ==
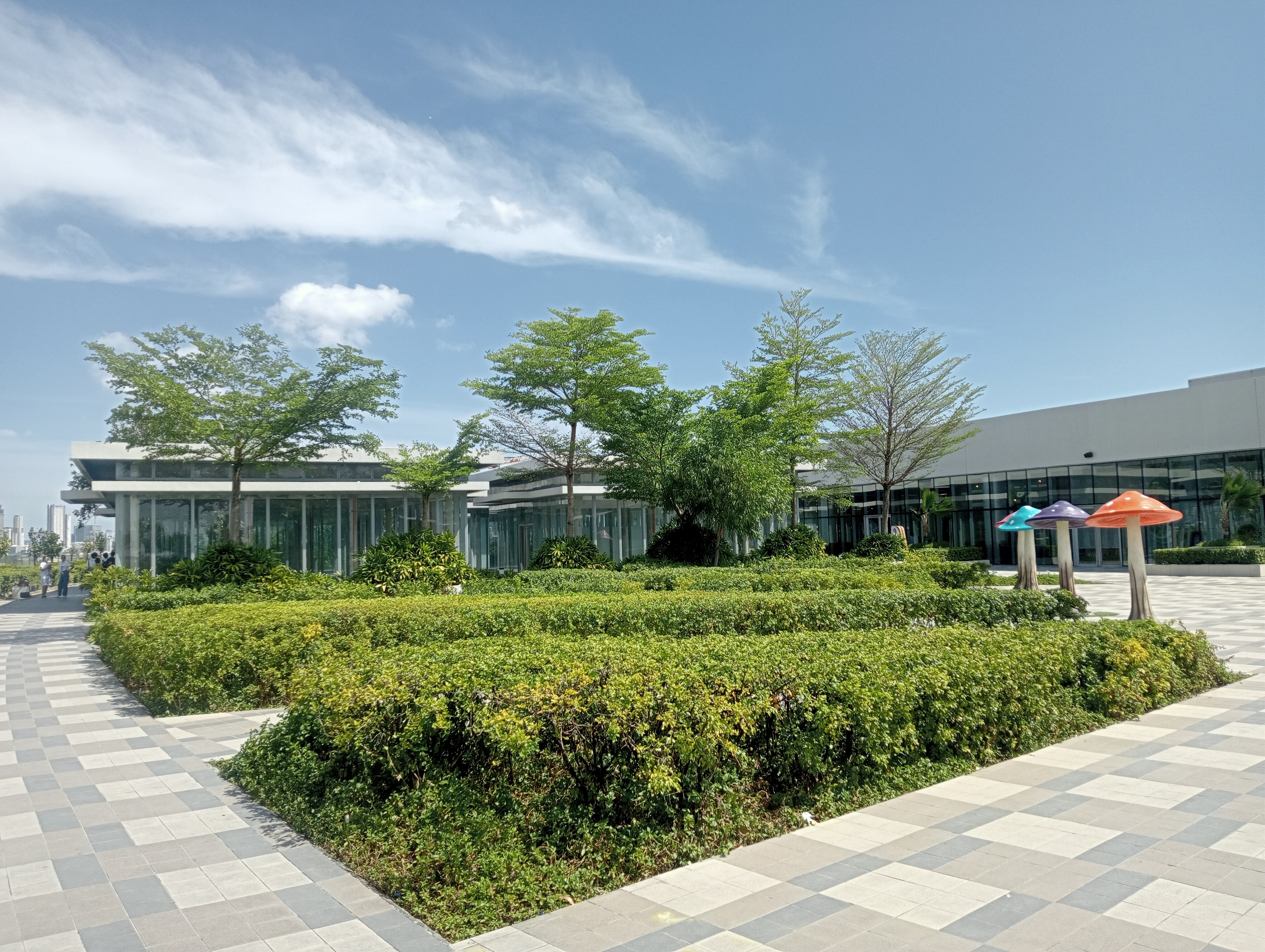
Sky Park

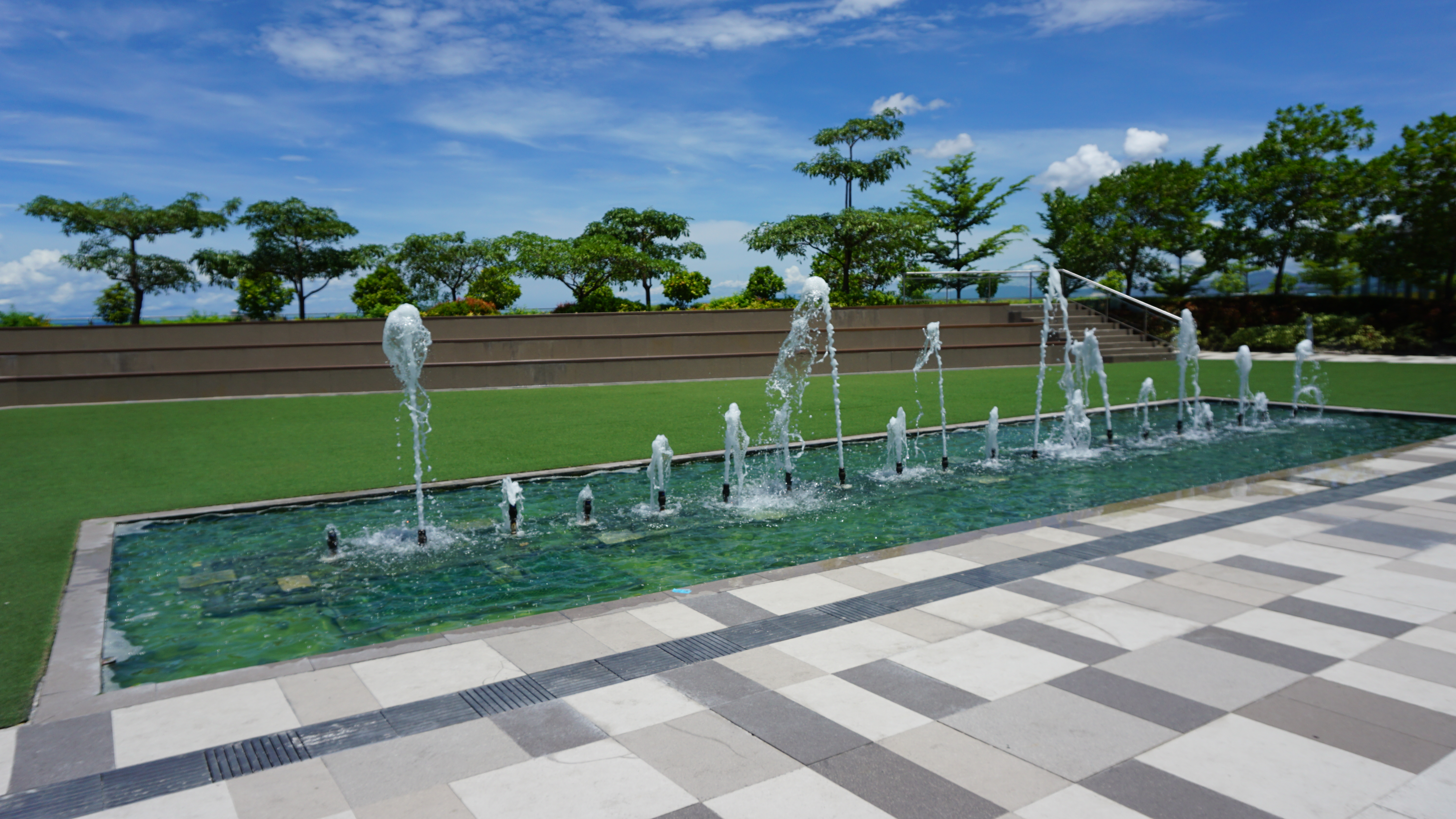
Sky Hall Fountain

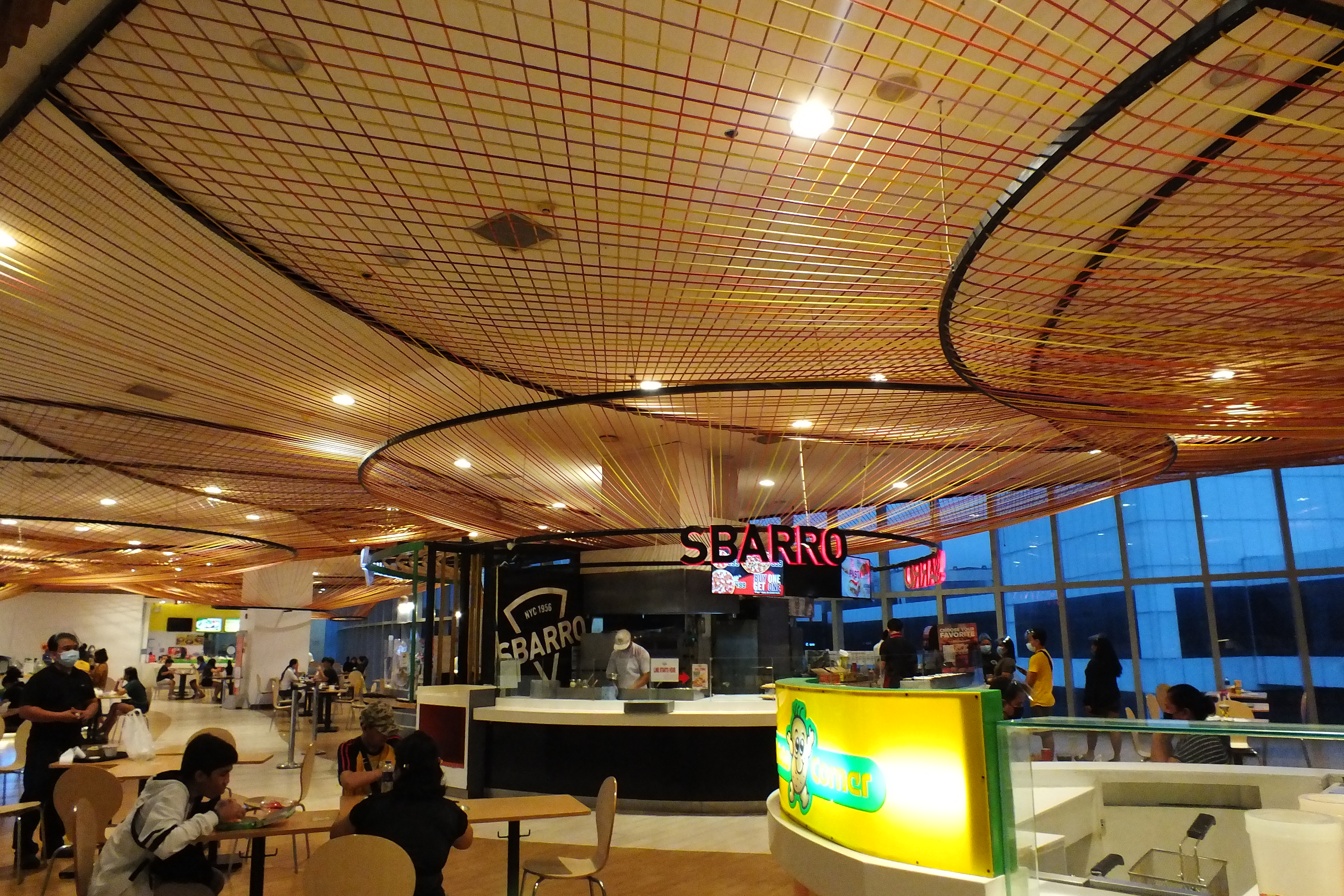
SM Food Court

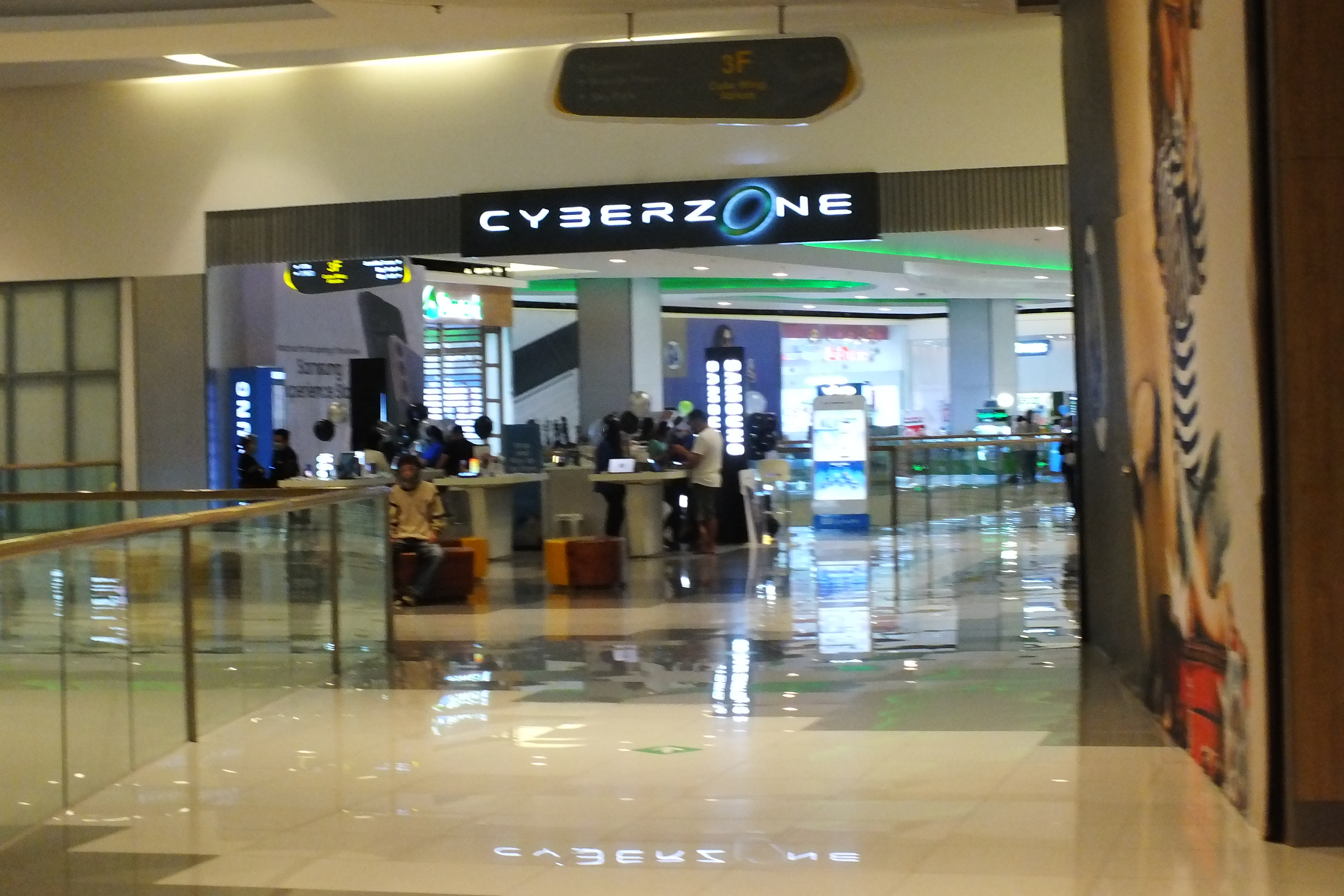
Cyberzone

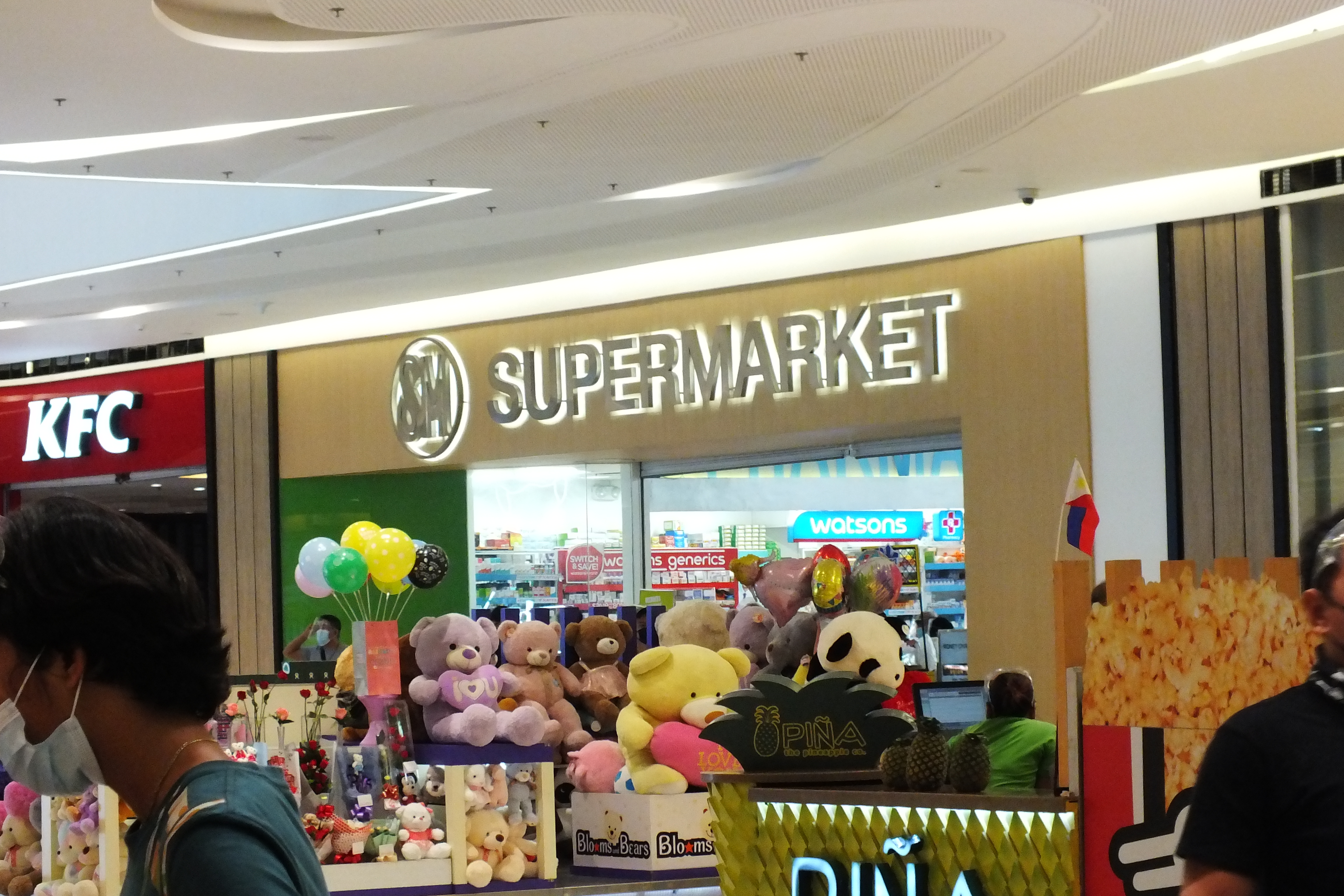
SM Supermarket

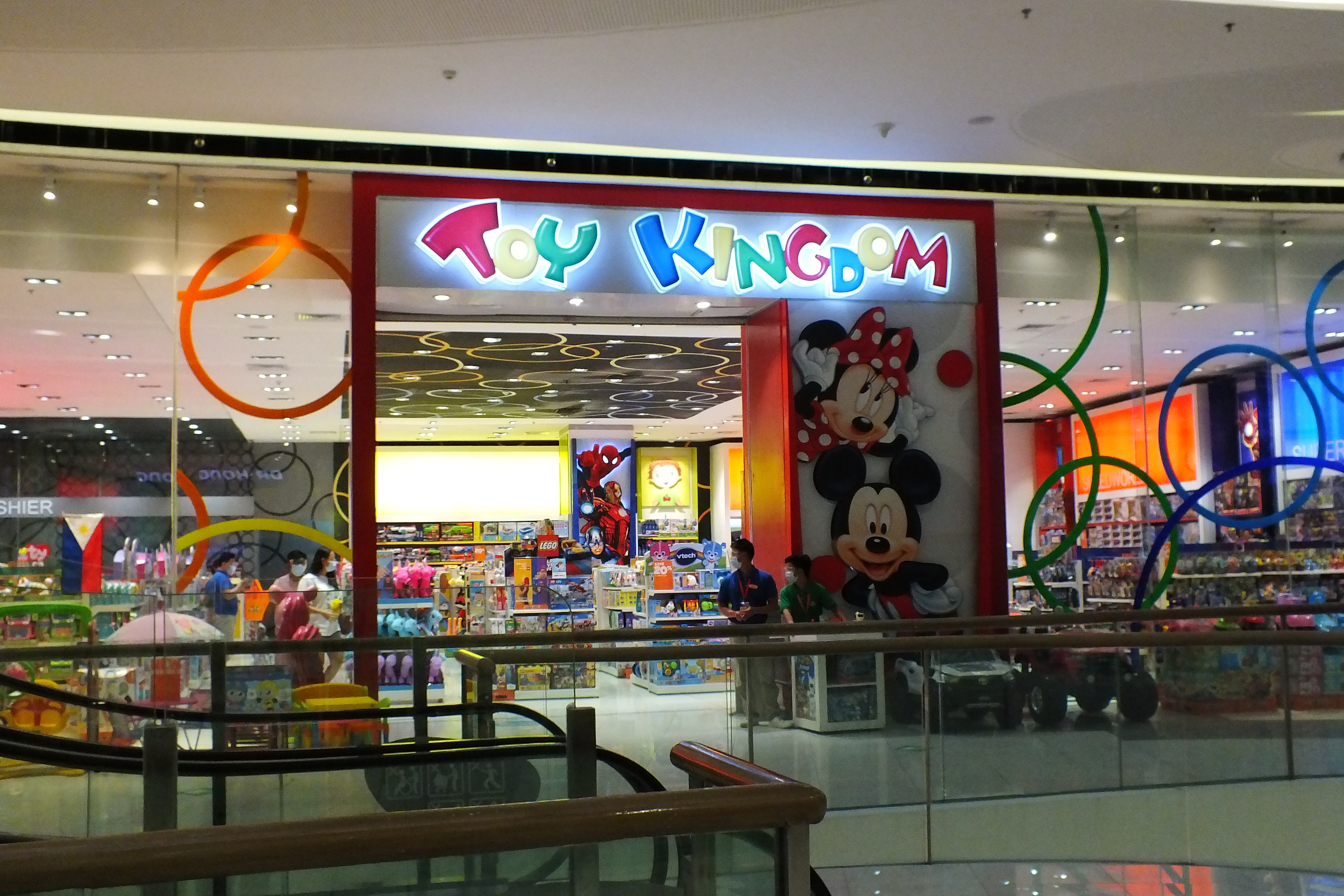
Toy Kingdom

== See also ==
- List of largest shopping malls in the world
- List of largest shopping malls in the Philippines
- List of shopping malls in the Philippines

Preceded by SM Center Sangandaan	56th SM Supermall; 2015	Succeeded by SM City San Jose Del Monte
