= Hou Chon BC =

Hou Chon
- League: EASL; All-Macau Basketball Silver Medal League
- Founded: 2012; 14 years ago
- Location: Macau
- Team colors: Blue, white

The Hou Chon Basketball Club (Chinese: 昊駿籃球俱樂部) is a professional basketball team based in Macau, which plays in the All-Macau Basketball Silver Medal League, and the East Asia Super League (EASL).

== History ==
The Hou Chon Sports Club first organized a basketball team in 2012. It was founded by Jeff Chang. Hou Chon has been playing in the All-Macau Basketball Silver Medal League as early as 2017.

Having won the league's 2026 Senior Division championship, Hou Chon qualified for the 2026–27 season of the East Asia Super League. It became the second Macanese team to do so after the Macau Black Bears.

== Head coaches ==
- (Macau) Long Ka Kin (2014–2026)
- (United States) Matthew Van Pelt (2026–)
