= South Coast City =

- Business district
- Country: Philippines
- Region: Central Visayas
- City: Cebu City
- Province: Cebu

Area
  - Land: 0.26 km^{2} (0.10 sq mi)
- Website: Official website

South Coast City is a 26 hectares (64 acres) mixed-use, master-planned, under-construction development located at the South Road Properties, Cebu City, Philippines. The development is built under the consortium between SM Prime Holdings and Ayala Land, and will cost ₱300 billion upon its construction. The 26-hectare development will involve an arena, convention center, a district square, a 1-hectare park, and other mixed-use facilities.

The major development broke ground in July 2019, and currently, the development is still under construction and its first phase is targeted to be completed by 2025.

== Commercial ==
=== The District Square ===
The District Square will be a waterside commercial area of the South Coast City development. Spanning 2.7 hectares of size, the commercial development will include parks and open spaces, pedestrian sidewalks, underground infrastructures, businesses, and other establishments. The District Square will also include 11 commercial lots. The commercial development is currently under construction and is among the main features of the South Coast City development, and will be built next to a 1-hectare park with a 35-meter frontage.

== Entertainment ==
=== SM Seaside Arena ===
The SM Seaside Arena is among the entertainment establishments in the South Coast City development. The SM Seaside Arena will be a multi-purpose indoor arena, with a 16,000-seater capacity, and it will be the largest indoor arena in the Cebu province upon its completion. The arena will host venues for local and international events, sports events, international conventions, and events for sports associations such as the Cebu Schools Athletic Foundation, Inc. (CESAFI) and Philippine Basketball Association (PBA) games. The arena was among the proposed venues for the failed Philippine bid for the 2019 FIBA Basketball World Cup.

Originally, the project was proposed in 2013 and was designed to be built within the SM Seaside complex, but plans for the arena was later cancelled in 2017. Proposals for the arena reinstated on 2019 and is instead planned to be built within the South Coast City development, instead of the SM Seaside complex. Currently, the SM Seaside Arena is under construction is targeted to be completed by 2025.

=== SMX Convention Center Cebu ===
The SMX Convention Center Cebu will be a convention center adjacent to the SM Seaside Arena. The convention center will include three levels; four exhibition halls will be on the ground level, while the smaller function rooms will be on the second and third levels. Upon completion, it is expected to cover a total floor area of 52,000 square metres (560,000 sq ft). The convention center is currently under construction, and is expected to be completed by 2026 respectively.
