= Danga City Mall =

Shopping mall in Johor Bahru, Johor, Malaysia

Coordinates: 1°28′25.8″N 103°45′20″E

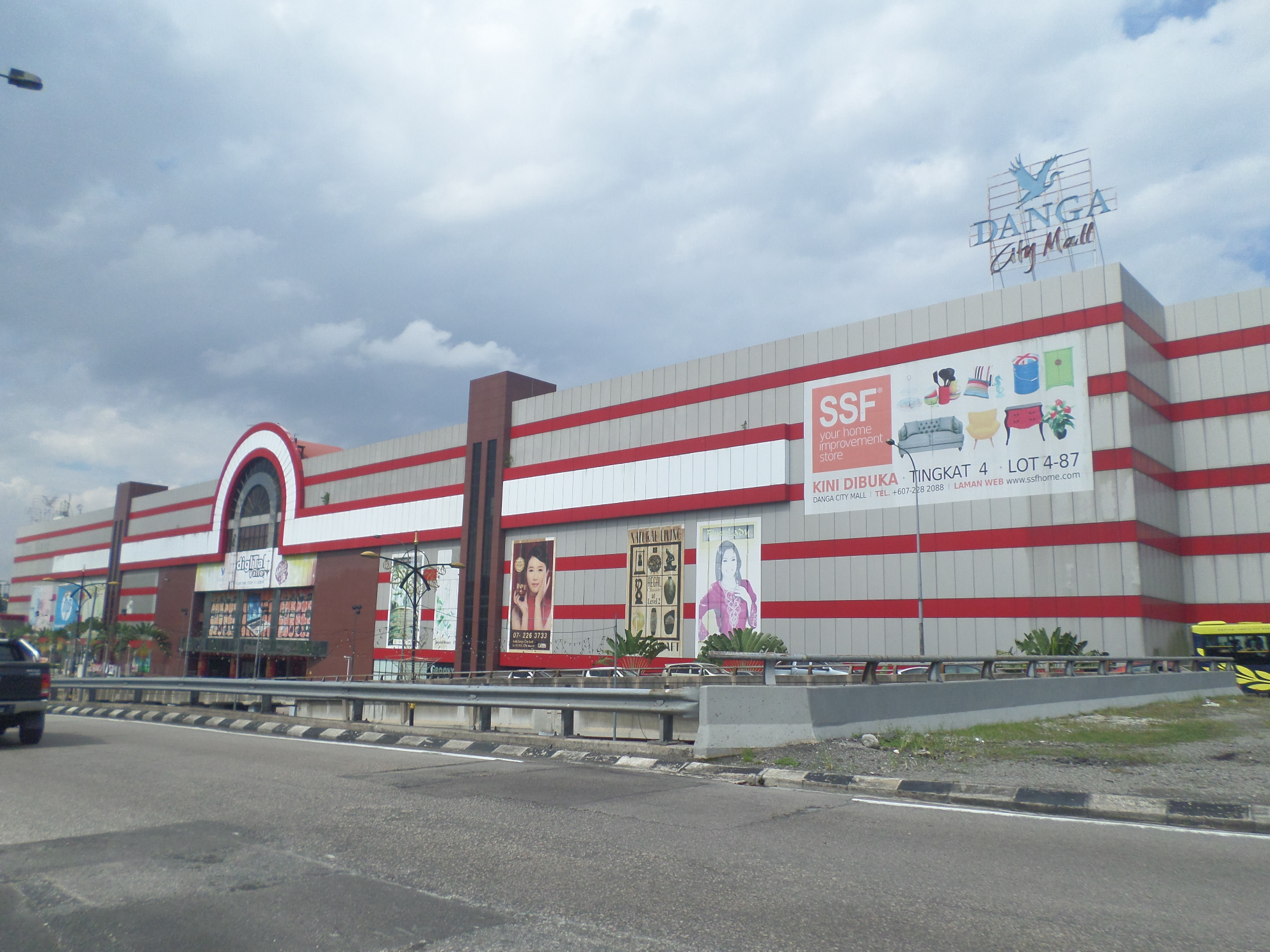
- Location: Johor Bahru, Johor, Malaysia
- Opened: 1996; 30 years ago (as The Best World) & 31 August 2008; 18 years ago (as Danga City Mall)
- Closed: 1998; 28 years ago (as The Best World) & 1 July 2018; 8 years ago (as Danga City Mall)
- Architect: Shopping mall
- Floor area: 93,000 m^{2}
- Floors: 7
- Parking: 1200 lots
- Website: www.dangacitymall.com

Danga City Mall, previously known as The Best World, was a shopping mall in Johor Bahru, Johor, Malaysia. Danga City Mall has an area of 1,000,000-square-foot (93,000 m^{2}) and up to 500,000-square-foot (46,000 m^{2}) nett lettable space on 7 levels.

== History ==
The shopping mall was originally opened in 1996 as The Best World but later closed in 1998 due to 1997 Asian financial crisis. After 10 years, it was re-opened as Danga City Mall on 31 August 2008. Later in 2009, it added an expo centre next to the mall to boost the numbers of patrons. However, in July 2018, the mall was closed again for renovation that never started.

== Transportation ==
The shopping mall is accessible by Causeway Link bus route S1. There used to be a KTM Intercity halt here when it was reopened in 2008 but was abandoned and is no longer in use.

== See also ==
- List of shopping malls in Malaysia
