= Ceres Transport =

Bus company in the Philippines

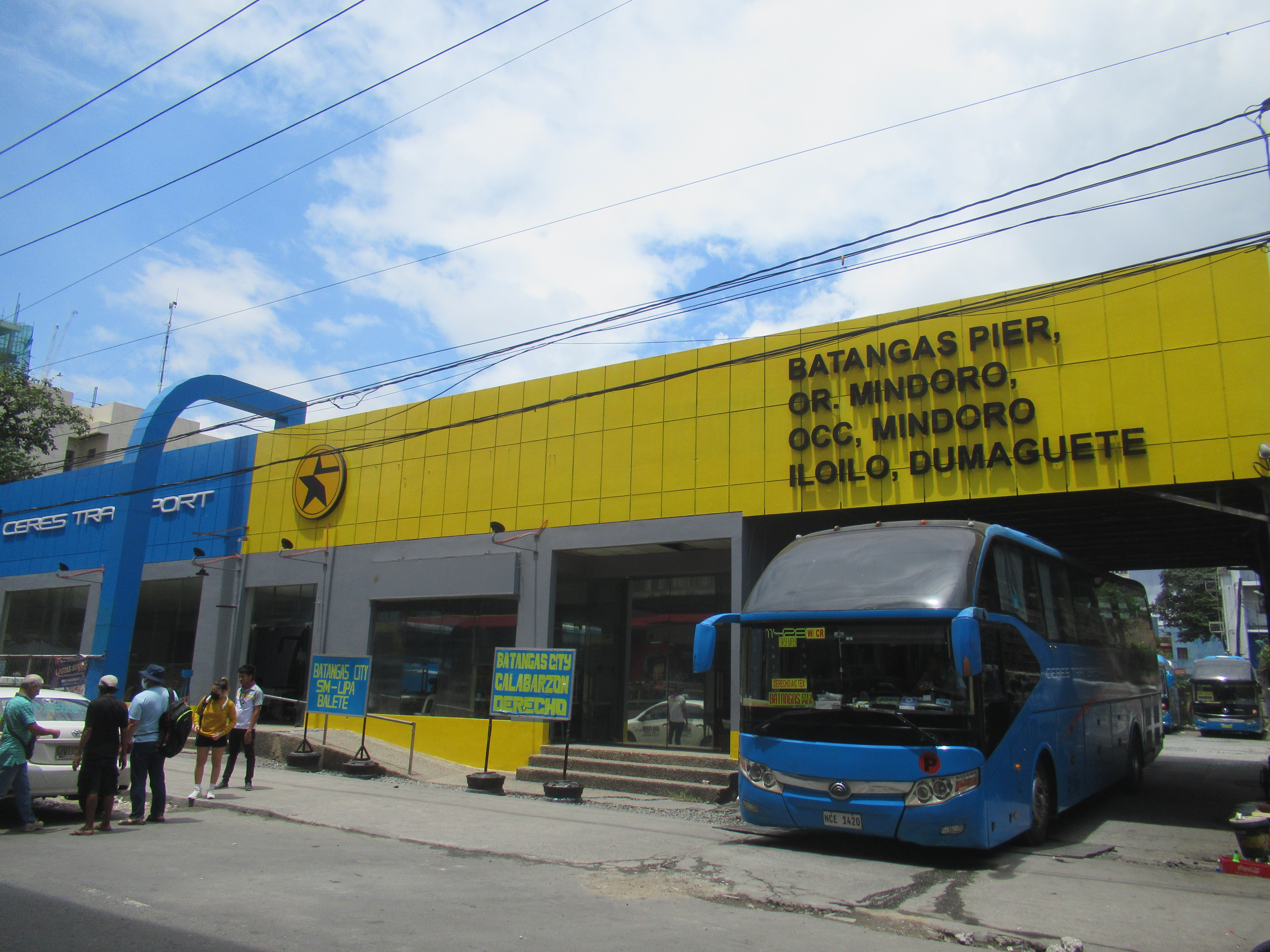
- Ceres Transport at Pasay Terminal
- Parent: Yanson Group of Bus Companies
- Founded: 2009; 17 years ago
- Headquarters: Barangay Bolbok, Batangas City
- Service area: Metro Manila; Batangas; Panay; Negros; Zamboanga Peninsula; Northern Mindanao; Caraga; Davao Region; SOCCSKSARGEN
- Service type: Provincial Operation
- Alliance: Gold Star Transport, Inc.
- Destinations: Batangas City; Quezon City; Muntinlupa; Pasay; Manila; Iloilo City; Sara; Kalibo; Estancia; Bacolod; Kabankalan; Hinoba-an; Dumaguete; Zamboanga City; General Santos; Cagayan de Oro; Davao City; Butuan City
- Hubs: Batangas
- Fleet: 600+
- Operator: Ceres Transport, Inc.
- Chief executive: Leo Rey V. Yanson (President and Chairman)
- Website: Ceres Transport

Ceres Transport, Incorporated, is a bus company under the umbrella of Yanson Group of Bus Companies (YGBC). Based in Batangas City, it operates bus transport services in Batangas and Metro Manila, using the Strong Republic Nautical Highway.

== History ==
In 2007, Ceres Liner's Iloilo base pioneered travel between Iloilo City and Metro Manila through the Western Nautical Highway. Proving to be profitable, Yanson Group expanded its Metro Manila operations and established Ceres Transport in 2009, being based in Batangas City. It enabled bus services encompassing Cubao, Batangas City, Mindoro, Aklan, Antique and Iloilo.

In 2012, it bought out a franchise of Gold Star Bus Company and allowed it to operate its Batangas-Cubao and Batangas-Alabang routes. Later on, Yanson Group decided to create its own subsidiary Gold Star Bus Transport Incorporated, making it apart from Ceres Transport Inc.

In 2022, Ceres Transport launched PITX - Zamboanga route which became the third bus company to have direct trips between Luzon and Mindanao following Philtranco and Davao Metro Shuttle.

In September 20, 2025 Ceres Transport launched Cubao, Quezon City - Cagayan de Oro route via Western Nautical Highway traversing the Cities of Iloilo, Bacolod, Dumaguete, Dapitan, Dipolog, Oroquieta, Ozamiz, Tangub and Iligan. Two days after the said route launched it follows the Cubao - Butuan City destination on September 22, 2025. While the Cubao, Quezon City - General Santos launched on September 23, 2025 and which was arrived on September 26, 2025 as it became the longest direct route by the company going to Mindanao.

== Branding ==
Ceres Transport was once a brand under Vallacar Transit Incorporated. The "transport" branding was once used to distinguish the Luzon-bound and those Ceres Liner buses at their former main base in Iloilo. Although Yanson Group had a practice to their bus branding such as "Liner" and "Tours" to differentiate their ordinary and air-conditioned buses, Ceres Transport does not have ordinary buses since it didn't click to Luzon market.

When Ceres Transport formed its own subsidiary and had its base in Batangas City, Yanson Group retained the Ceres Transport brand.

== Base ==
Their subsidiaries are subdivided by bases. These are based on the area of their operation, and their base number shall be the prefix number for their bus fleets. Yanson Group started this practice in 2005 after they bought out Lilian Express Inc., and felt that re-organizing their company was needed.

There is only one base for Ceres Transport:

Prefix	Base Name	Address
11	Batangas	Bolbok, Batangas City, Batangas

== Bus routes ==
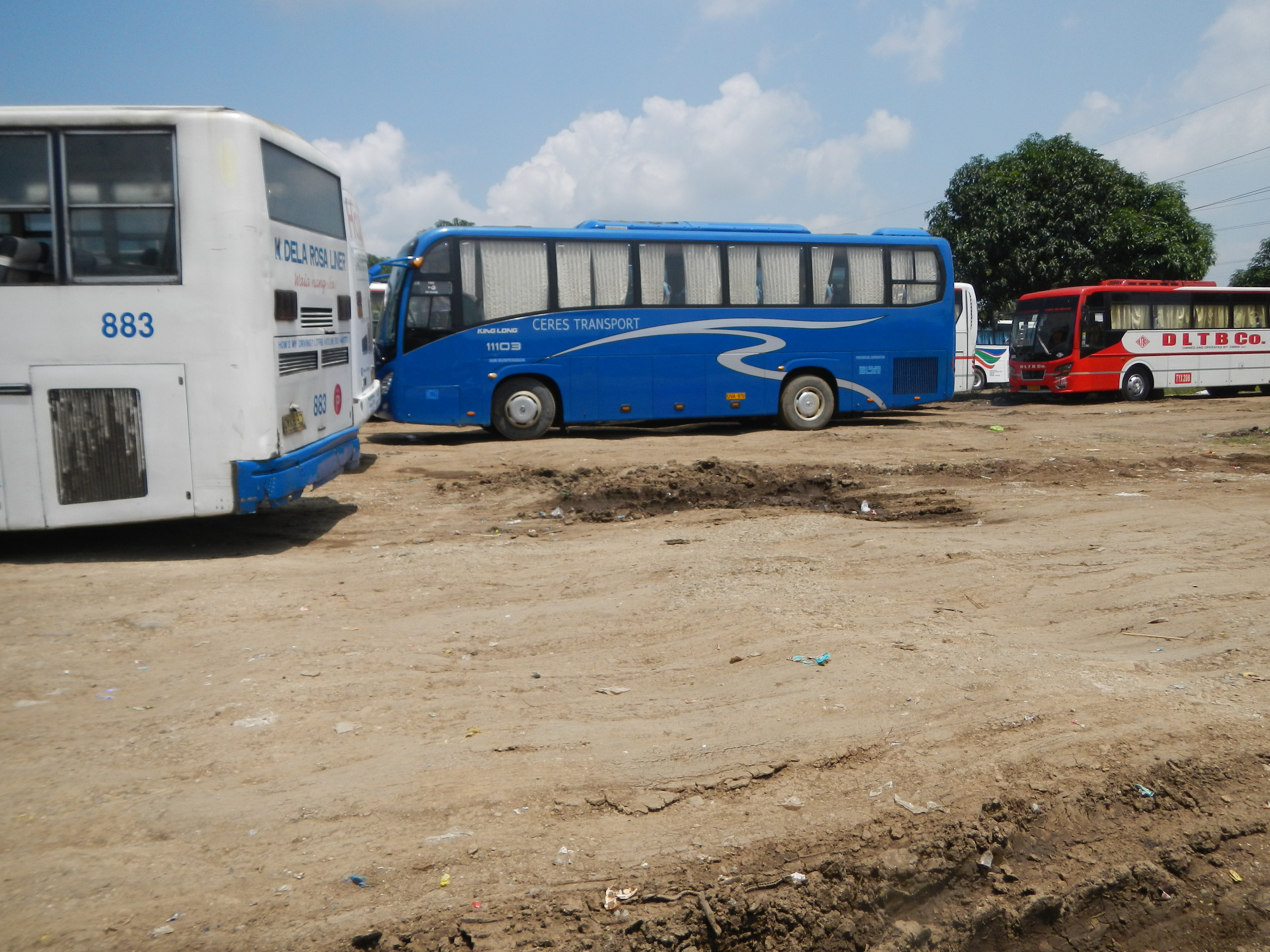
A Ceres Transport bus at Batangas Port

- Batangas City - Cubao via Turbina or ACTEX
- Batangas City - Alabang via Turbina or ACTEX
- Batangas City - PITX/Buendia/Lawton via ACTEX
- Batangas City - PITX/SM Mall of Asia via ACTEX
- PITX - San Jose, Occidental Mindoro via Batangas City
- PITX - Iloilo City via Batangas City
- Pasay/Cubao - Iloilo City via Central Iloilo or Antique
- Pasay/Cubao - Sara via Alabang
- Pasay/Cubao - Estancia via Alabang
- Cubao - Bulalacao, Oriental Mindoro via Calapan City
- Cubao - Kalibo via Central Iloilo
- Cubao - Bacolod
- Cubao - Dumaguete via Bacolod and Kabankalan via Iloilo City.
- Cubao - Butuan City via Philippine Nautical Highway System
- Cubao - Cagayan de Oro City via Philippine Nautical Highway System
- Cubao - Cebu City via Negros
- Cubao - General Santos City via Philippine Nautical Highway System
- Cubao - Hinoba-an via Bacolod, Himamaylan, Kabankalan, Sipalay
- Cubao - Zamboanga City via Liloy
- Cubao - Davao City via Philippine Nautical Highway System
- Cubao - Tagbilaran City via Cebu City

== Fleet ==
Ceres Transport has several units from Chinese brand buses. Some of their fleets are also provided by their parent company's coach building division, Vallacar Transit Incorporated - Transport Engineering and Bus Body Assembly Plant (VTI-TEBBAP).

- Yanson ViKing
- Yanson Legacy
- Yutong ZK6127HA/HYG
- Yutong ZK6117HYG
- Yutong ZK6119HYG
- King Long XMQ6126Y
- King Long XMQ6119T
- King Long XMQ6125AY
- King Long XMQ6128AYW

== See also ==
- Vallacar Transit
- Mindanao Star
- List of bus companies of the Philippines
