= Cebu North Bus Terminal =

Public bus terminal in Cebu City, Philippines

General information
- Location: SM City Cebu, North Reclamation Area, Cebu City; Philippines
- Coordinates: 10°18′39.93″N 123°55′14.81″E
- Owner: Cebu Provincial Government
- Operator: Cebu Provincial Government

History
- Opened: October 12, 2020
Location
- Location within Metro Cebu

The Cebu North Bus Terminal (CNBT) is a bus station in Cebu City, Philippines operated by the Cebu Provincial Government which serves as a hub for buses servicing northern Cebu. CNBT was previously located in a lot owned by the Mandaue city government in Barangay Subangdaku which was under a lease agreement with Cebu City government, which in turn granted the Cebu Provincial Bus Operators Multi-purpose Cooperative, Inc. (CPBOMCI) the management of the terminal.

== History ==
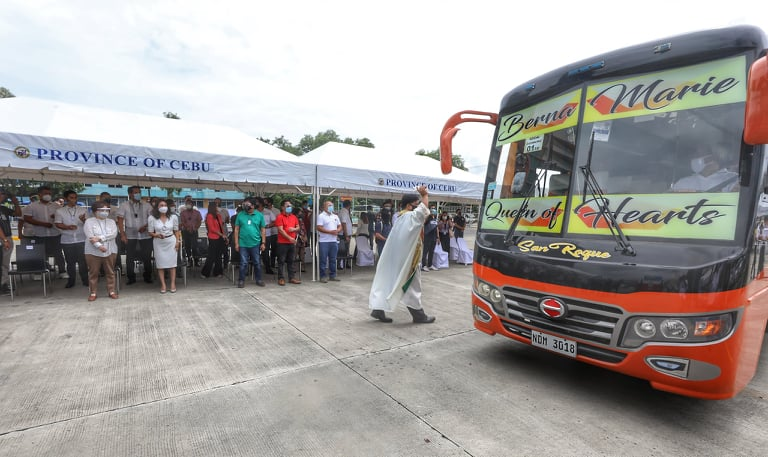
Soft opening of the new Cebu North Bus Terminal on October 12, 2020.

The old terminal's construction was part of the project components under the Metro Cebu Development Project Phase 2 (MCDP II) wherein the Regional Development Council for Region VII, through the Government of the Philippines, entered into a loan agreement with Japan's Official Development Assistance to fund the said project. Its construction was supposed to commence in January 1990 but was then moved to the early part of 1992. It was again delayed due to the bidding process and selection of consultants.

The construction eventually began in July 1993 and was completed by October 1994 with 24 bus lanes and 27 jeepney lanes. The construction period, which was planned to span for 18 months was reduced to 16 months. It was supposed to be a project for Mandaue but then Mayor Alfredo Ouano wanted to have the facility converted into a school. This in turn prompted then Cebu City Mayor Tomas Osmeña to offer a lease agreement in operating the terminal for a period of 25 years with an annual rent of ₱2 million. The lease agreement between the two cities was signed on January 11, 1995. With the Cebu City Government leasing the site, it then entered into a memorandum of agreement with the Cebu Provincial Bus Operators Multi-purpose Cooperative, Inc. (CPBOMCI) to manage the terminal's operations for a period of 25 years. Despite the terminal's jeepney lanes, the number of jeepneys using it were below the initial target of 1,331. Only 70 jeepneys utilized the terminal in 2000.

In 2012, the Cebu Provincial Government, led by then Governor Gwendolyn Garcia, proposed that the province takeover the terminal's operations promising "better facilities" according to then Cebu Provincial Board Member Sun Shimura. This also meant that the Cebu City Government had to pay ₱14 million to pre-terminate the contract. However, then Cebu City Administrator Jose Mari Poblete left the decision to the Mandaue city Government if it would be amenable in pre-terminating the contract. While the proposal was still on the table, a four-month study was done to improve the facility and its revenue generation.

As the lease agreement was about to expire in October 2020, Mandaue City Mayor Jonas Cortes in December 2019 decided not to renew the agreement to make way for the construction of government facilities in the said lot where the terminal is located. This prompted Cebu City Mayor Edgardo Labella to scout of a new location of the terminal among which was the 3.3-hectare (8.2-acre) Block 27 in North Reclamation Area.

On March 29, 2020, the terminal, along with the Cebu South Bus Terminal, was temporarily closed as Cebu City was placed under enhanced community quarantine (ECQ) due to the COVID-19 pandemic. With Mandaue placed on enhanced community quarantine on May 16, 2020, the terminal was moved to Consolacion at Sta. Lucia Town Square and later, on August 11, 2020, to Tambayan Consolacion Food Park in Barangay Pitogo, Consolacion. The old terminal was also planned as an isolation facility catering to COVID-19 patients in the city.

In late September 2020, the Cebu Provincial Government announced that it was to takeover the operations of the new terminal to be situated inside the SM City Cebu compound with the lot granted by SM Prime Holdings Inc. for free for a period of two years. It was officially opened on October 12, 2020 and will start its full operations on October 15, 2020.

== Services ==
=== Provincial ===
==== Bus ====
- Metro Cebu Autobus – operates bus service to and from Maya Port in Daanbantayan via Bagay, Daanbantayan proper via Kawit, and Polambato Port in Bogo City.
- Vallacar Transit – operates Ceres Liner and Sugbo Transit Express which services routes to destinations in northern Cebu, Bantayan Island, Camotes Island, Negros Island, and Leyte.
- White Stallion Express - operates bus services to and from Daanbantayan, Medellin and Hagnaya Port in San Remigio.
- Provincial buses such as 3 Brothers, Julia Transport, and Cebu San Sebastian Liner which operate to and from Tuburan, Borbon, Sogod and Tabogon.
- Provincial buses such as CADCO Trans MPC and ABC Liner which operate to and from Catmon, Carmen, Danao City and Bogo City.

=== Intercity ===
==== Bus ====
- MyBus - a public bus transportation operated by Metro Rapid Transit Services, Inc. (MRTSI), serves passengers coming the city going to Anjo World in Minglanilla, Talisay City, SM Seaside, Fuente Circle, Cebu Business Park, and Cebu I.T. Park in Cebu City, Parkmall in Mandaue City up to Mactan–Cebu International Airport. It can accommodate up to 90 passengers including standing passengers.
