= Vallacar Transit =

Bus company in the Philippines

Vallacar Transit Incorporated
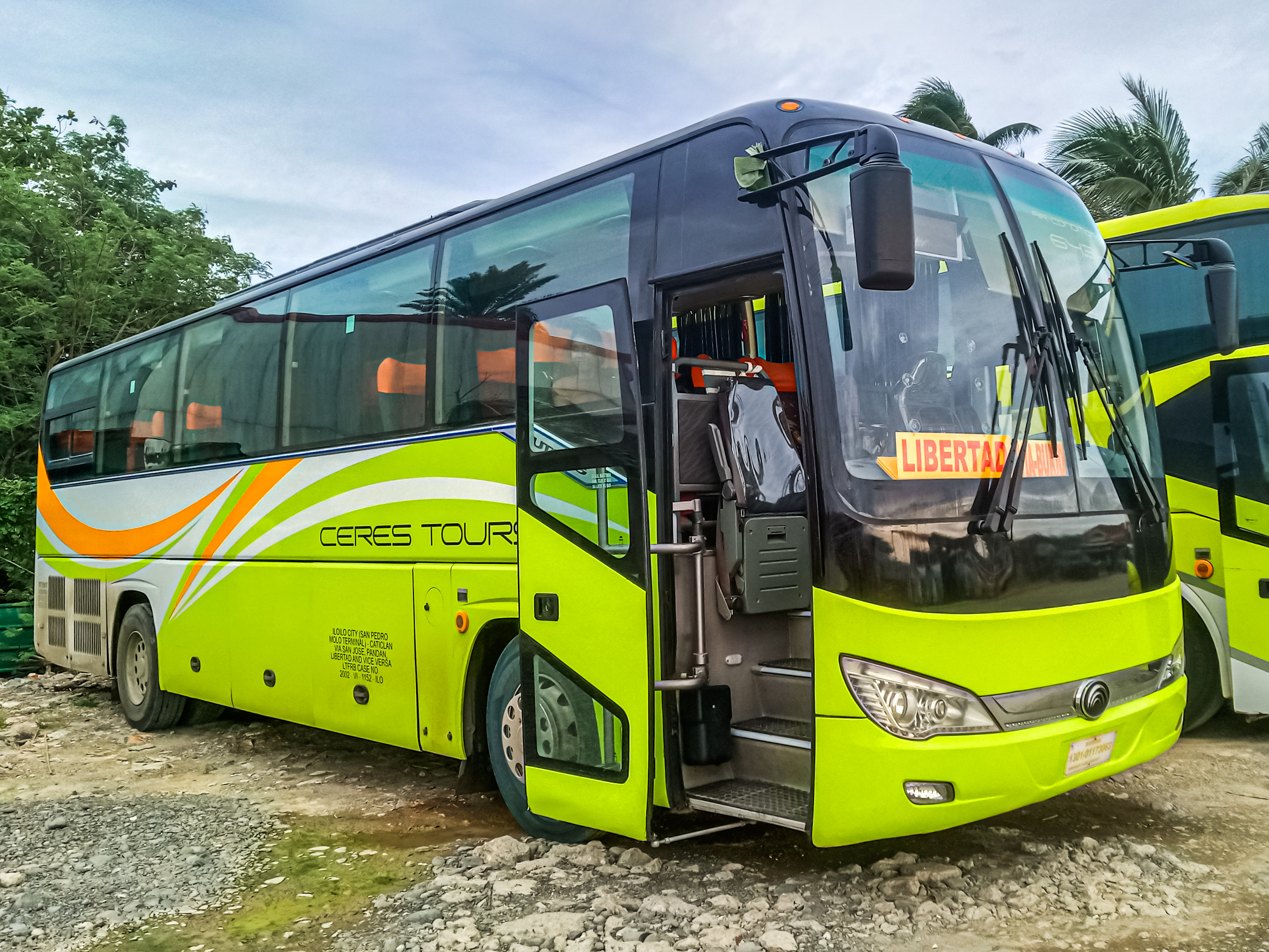
- A Yutong ZK6119HYG bus unit of Ceres Tours, with body number 6434.
- Parent: Yanson Group of Bus Companies
- Founded: 1968; 58 years ago
- Headquarters: Barangay Mansilingan, Bacolod, Philippines
- Service area: Visayas; Zamboanga Peninsula
- Service type: City and Provincial Operation
- Hubs: Bacolod; Iloilo; Dumaguete; Cebu
- Fleet: 4,800+ bus includes Yutong, King Long, and Hino motors. Formerly Nissan Diesel units
- Chief executive: Leo Rey V. Yanson
- Website: ceresliner.com

Vallacar Transit Incorporated (VTI) is a Philippine transportation service under the umbrella of the Yanson Group of Bus Companies (YGBC), serving as its flagship subsidiary.

The bus company is a family-owned and managed business that has grown from a lone 14-seater jeepney plying a single route called Ceres Liner, to a conglomerate of transportation companies that operates thousands of bus units, operating and serving in the Visayas, as well as the Zamboanga Peninsula in Mindanao. The company pioneered inter-modal services between Negros and Cebu.

== History ==
Dr. Ricardo Y. Yanson Sr. had a 14-seater jeepney that plied the routes in Bacolod and nearby towns in 1968.

Ricardo was fond of experimenting with motor vehicles and had a penchant for automotive body works. He tried his hands and skills in assembling more jeepneys while his wife Olivia managed the warehouse and served as the collector of the daily “boundaries” from their drivers.

Olivia quit her nursing job at a rural health unit in Dumaguete to help her husband run the small business as ‘bodegera’ by day and ‘collector’ at night.

Vallacar was originally owned by the family of Ricardo. However, Vallacar grew because Ricardo was active then, buying second-hand trucks from Manila and rebuilding them as transport units for VTI.

In the 1970s, the Yanson couple diversified into a small bus line which plied the Bacolod-Valladolid-La Carlota route or Val-La-Car for short. It was named Ceres Liner, after Ricardo's younger sister.

Ricardo died in 2015 at age of 86, and left the leadership and management of Vallacar Transit, Incorporated and its conglomerate to his son, Leo Rey Yanson, with the guidance of his wife Olivia.

In 2016, Ceres Liner bought around 70 bus franchises from D' Rough Riders Express. It then formed a new brand as Sugbo Transit which is named after the old name of Cebu, Sugbo. The said branding is under the management of Ceres Liner's Cebu Base, but was discontinued in 2024.

On December 5, 2020, Vallacar Transit Inc. (VTI) reappoints Leo Rey Yanson as the chairman of the board and president during their firm's annual stockholders meeting at its principal office in Barangay Mansilingan, Bacolod. During their meeting, it was released that Olivia V. Yanson, Leo Rey V. Yanson, Ginnette Y. Dumancas, Charles M. Dumancas, Anita G. Chua, Arvin John V. Villaruel and Daniel Nicolas Golez were re-elected as members of VTI's board of directors.

=== Under Leo Rey Yanson's leadership ===
Vallacar Transit Inc. (VTI), the country's largest bus company, held its annual stockholders meeting at its principal office in Barangay Mansilingan, Bacolod. In the meeting, VTI disclosed that those reelected as members of its board of directors included Olivia V. Yanson, Leo Rey V. Yanson, Ginnette Y. Dumancas, Charles M. Dumancas, Anita G. Chua, Arvin John V. Villaruel and Daniel Nicolas Golez.

Following the election of directors, the board held an organizational meeting where Leo Rey Yanson was reappointed as chairman of the board and president of VTI, while VTI co-founder Olivia V. Yanson was reappointed as corporate secretary and treasurer.

Under Leo Rey Yanson's leadership, the Yanson Group of Bus Companies (YGBC) is currently composed of more than 4,800 buses, 18,000 employees providing public transportation to around 700,000 people daily in the Philippines.

In November 2025, the Supreme Court of the Philippines ruled against former Vallacar Transit Inc. (VTI) director Ricardo Yanson Jr., who had fled the country and is considered a fugitive. The court granted VTI’s petition in a grave coercion case, ruling that Ricardo Jr. cannot seek judicial relief while evading legal proceedings. VTI chairman and CEO Leo Rey Yanson welcomed the decision, stating that it reinforced the principle that no one is above the law.

The ruling occurred amid an ongoing family dispute over the estate of YGBC co-founder Ricardo B. Yanson Sr., whose death in 2015 divided the family into two factions. The current VTI board of directors for 2026 includes Olivia Yanson, Leo Rey Yanson, Ginnette Yanson-Dumancas, Charles Dumancas, Anita Chua, Arvin John Villarue, and Daniel Nicolas Golez.

VTI announced plans to accelerate its modernization program in 2026, which includes fleet renewal, customer experience improvements, digital integration, and expanded nationwide connectivity. Leo Rey Yanson described the initiative as part of building a “future-ready transport system” for the Philippines.

== Controversies ==
In June 2020, prosecutors filed a criminal complaint with Bacolod Regional Trial Court Branch 44 against Roy Yanson, Ma. Lourdes Celina Y. Lopez, Ricardo Yanson Jr. and Emily Yanson — the “Yanson 4” — acting as the new VTI officers. They were charged with qualified theft for allegedly seizing several titles and documents from VTI when they tried to take control of the Company in 2019. The VTI management led by Leo Rey Yanson and Olivia Yanson filed the instant certiorari case. On July 30, 2024, the Cebu City Court of Appeals ordered the “Yanson 4” to surrender documents in the pending litigation. The Yanson family and Yanson Group of Bus Companies’ original titles properties and specific documents were ordered placed in custodia legis to maintain the status quo and as evidence in the criminal case.

== VTI Brands ==
Ceres Liner was the first branding under Vallacar Transit Incorporated which was named after the youngest sister of the founder, Ricardo Yanson Sr. As their operations expanded, several brands are added with different functions and area of operations.

Brand	Function / Description
Ceres Liner	The bus brand for non air-conditioned or ordinary fare buses of Vallacar Transit Incorporated.
Ceres Tours	The bus brand for air-conditioned buses of Vallacar Transit Incorporated.
Cebu Interim Bus System (CIBUS)	The bus brand for buses that ply intercity Cebu routes, and is co-operated by Vallacar Transit Incorporated and the Cebu City government.
Sugbo Urban	The bus brand for buses that ply Cebu to Siquijor route and is operated by Sugbo Transit Express Inc.
Vallacar Transit Incorporated – Transport Engineering and Bus Body Assembly Plant (VTI-TEBBAP)	The coachbuilding division of Yanson Group of Bus Companies. Although the division serves for the whole YGBC Bus Companies, the management and supervision is under the name of Vallacar Transit Incorporated

== Bases ==
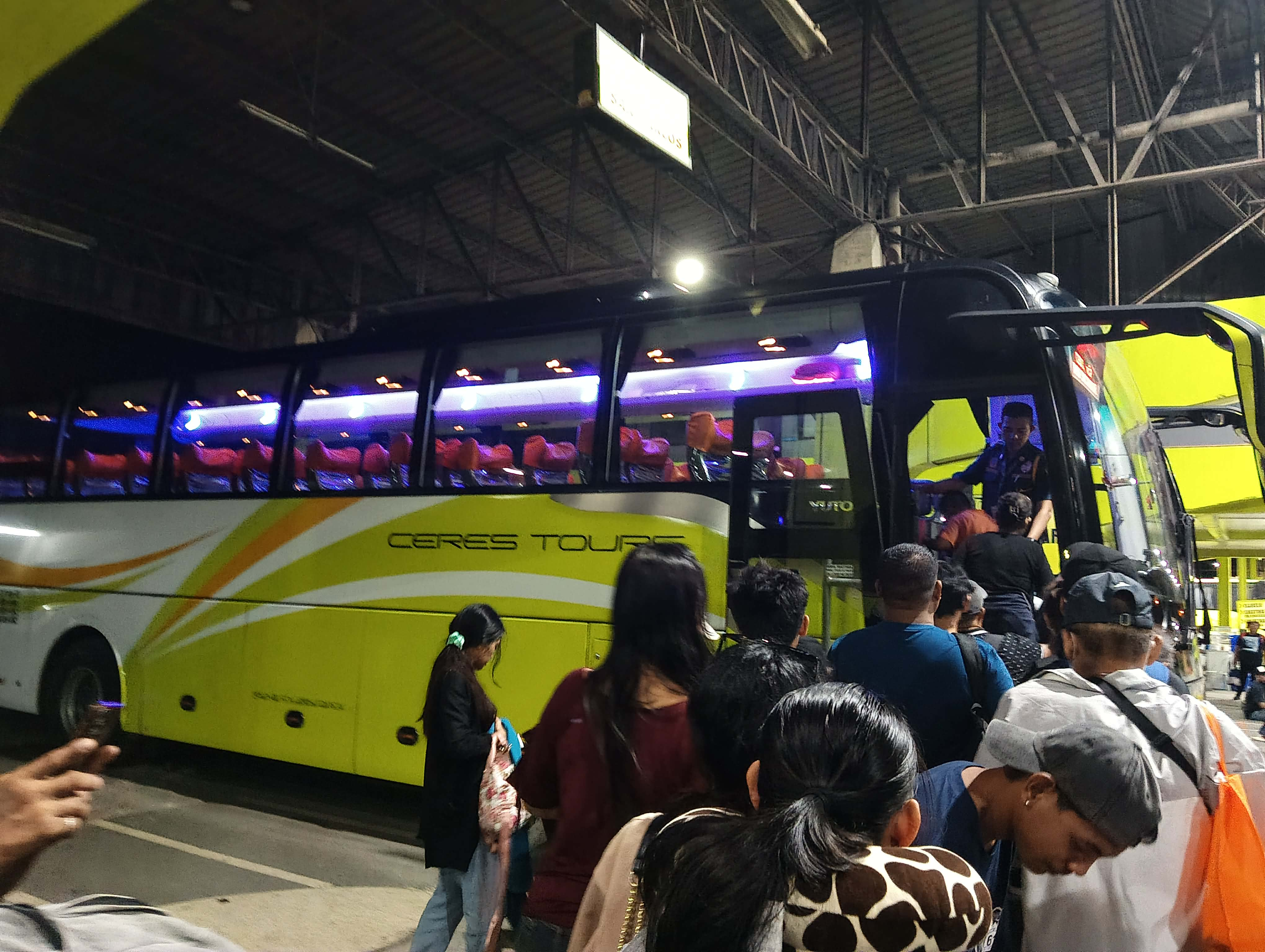
A Ceres Tours Yutong ZK6117HYG bus while embarking passengers.

Their subsidiaries are sub-divided by bases. These are based on their area of their operation, and their base number shall be the prefix number for their bus fleets. Yanson Group started this practice in 2005 after they bought out Lilian Express Inc., and felt that re-organizing their company is needed.

There are four bases under Vallacar Transit Incorporated:

Prefix	Base	Address	Subsidiary
5	Bacolod	Mansilingan, Bacolod City	Ceres Liner and Ceres Tours
6	Iloilo	Jaro, Iloilo City	Ceres Liner and Ceres Tours
7	Dumaguete	Calindagan, Dumaguete City	Ceres Liner and Ceres Tours
8	Cebu	Rizal Ave. Ext., Cebu City And Ouano Ave., Mandaue City	Ceres Liner, Ceres Tours, CIBUS, and Sugbo Urban

== Destinations ==
Since the re-organization of Yanson Group of Bus Companies in 2005, Vallacar Transit Inc. is sub-divided into bases in which has different areas of service and destinations.

=== Bacolod Base ===
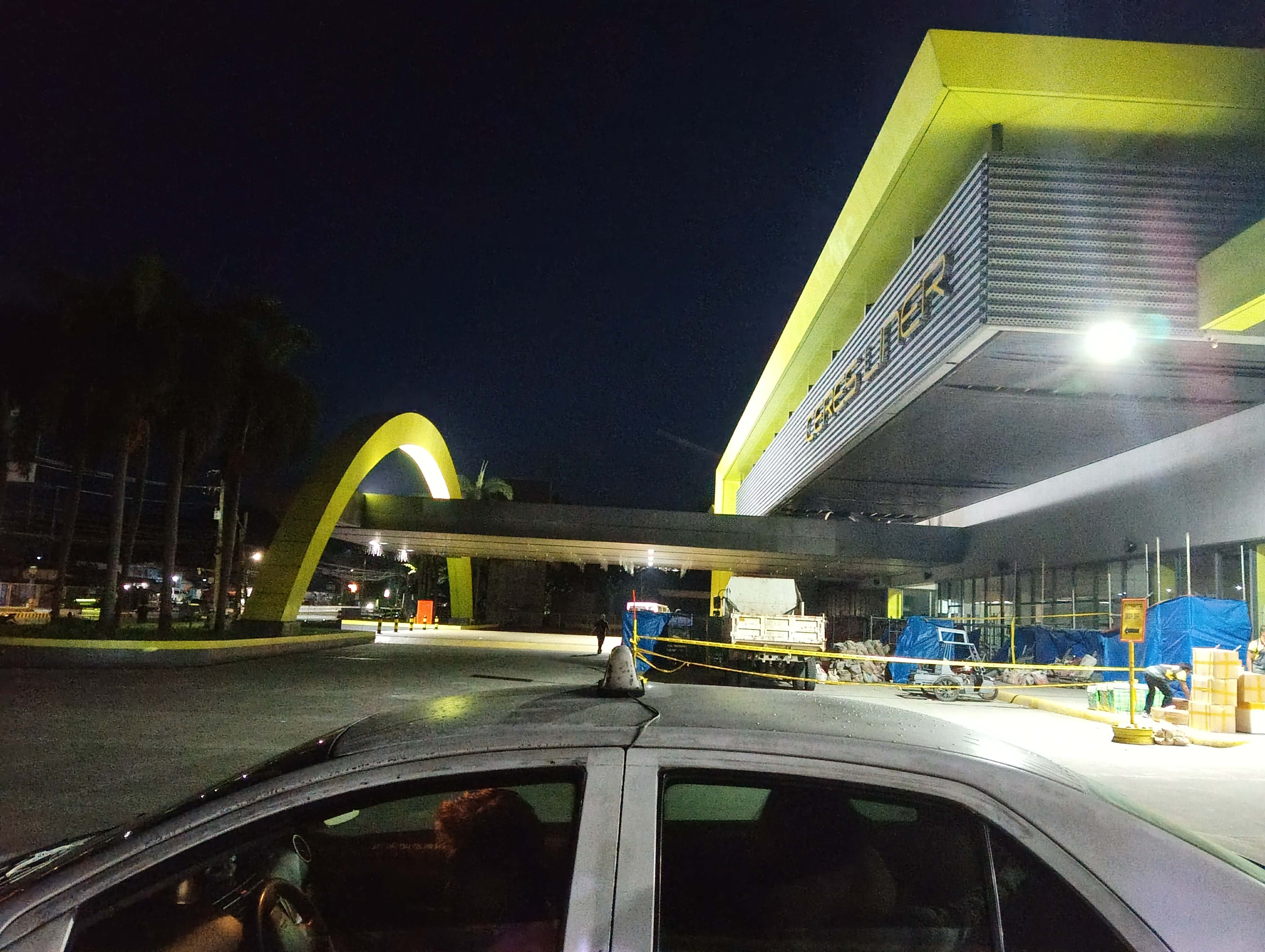
Vallacar Transit Bacolod Northbound Bus Terminal

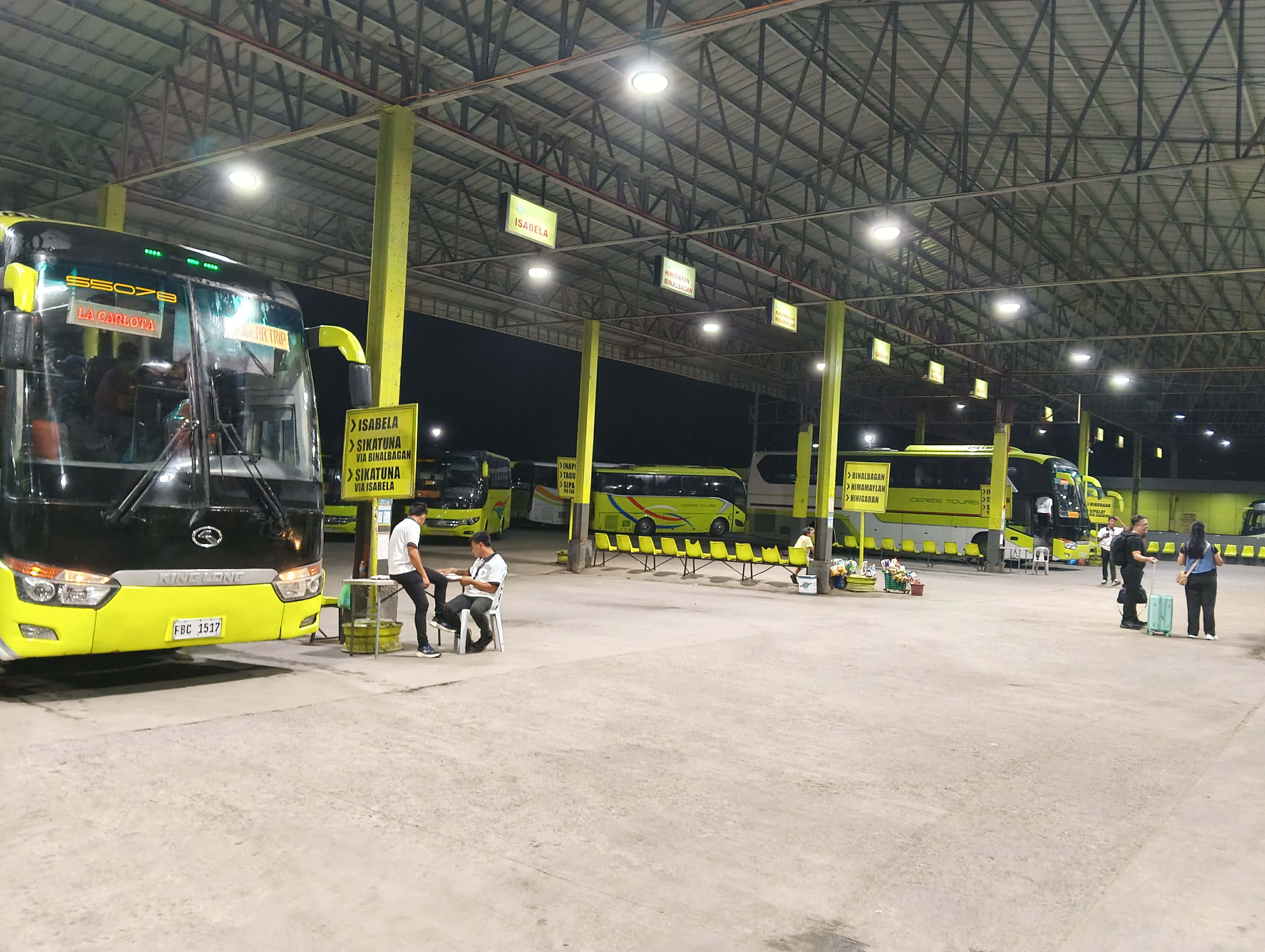
A fleet of Vallacar Transit Incorporated at Bacolod, Negros Occidental

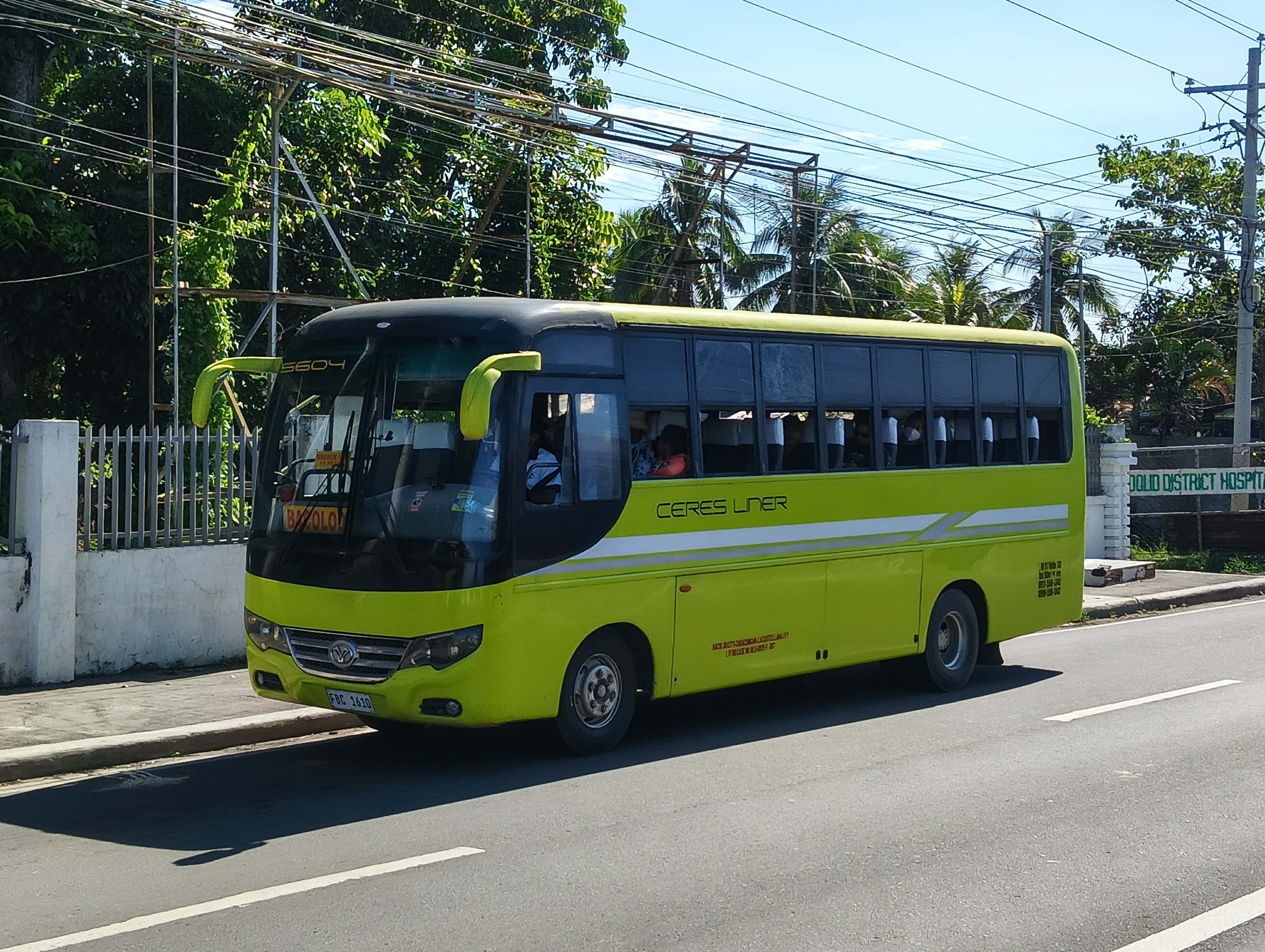
Ceres Liner 5604 heading to Bacolod City

The Bacolod Base is located at Masilingan, Bacolod with its terminal hub at Ceres Bus Liner North Terminal, Mandalagan, Bacolod and at Bacolod South Terminal, Luzuriaga St, Bacolod. It is also the main base for Vallacar Transit Incorporated. The base is assigned as Base 5 of Yanson Group of Bus Companies. Their routes are from Bacolod to the rest of the Negros Island Region, Cebu and Zamboanga City.

From North branch

- Bacolod – Cebu City via Escalante/Tabuelan
- Bacolod – Victorias City
- Bacolod – Cadiz
- Bacolod – Sagay City/Vito
- Bacolod – Escalante
- Bacolod – Minapasuk, Calatrava
- Bacolod – San Carlos City via Cadiz
- Bacolod – San Carlos City via Salvador Benedicto
- Bacolod – San Carlos City via Bug-Ang, Toboso
- Bacolod – Quezon (San Carlos City)
- Bacolod – Canlaon via San Carlos
- Bacolod – Dumaguete via Escalante/San Carlos
- Bacolod – Zamboanga City via Cadiz/San Carlos City/Dumaguete/Dipolog/Ipil/Dapitan

Loop Service

- San Carlos City - Canlaon

From South branch

- Bacolod – Cebu City via Toledo City/Salvador Benedicto/San Carlos City
- Bacolod – Cebu City via Canlaon/Bulado (Guihulngan)/Tangil (Dumanjug)
- Bacolod – Cebu City via Kabankalan City/Mabinay
- Bacolod – Dumaguete via Kabankalan City/Mabinay
- Bacolod – La Carlota
- Bacolod – La Castellana
- Bacolod – Ma-ao, Bago
- Bacolod – Pontevedra
- Bacolod – Canlaon via Magallon
- Bacolod – Canlaon via Biak na Bato
- Bacolod – Kabankalan
- Bacolod – Inapoy, Kabankalan
- Bacolod – Bantayan, Kabankalan
- Bacolod – Sikatuna (Isabela) via Isabela
- Bacolod – Sikatuna, Isabela via Binalbagan
- Bacolod – Narra (Camalanda-an, Cauayan)
- Bacolod – Sipalay via Cauayan
- Bacolod – Sipalay via Candoni
- Bacolod – Bactolon (Camindagan, Sipalay)
- Bacolod – Hinoba-an
- Bacolod – Candoni
- Bacolod – Binalbagan
- Bacolod – Bayawan
- Bacolod – Zamboanga City via Kabankalan City/Mabinay/Dumaguete/Dipolog/Ipil/Dapitan

=== Iloilo Base ===
Iloilo Base is located at Jaro, Iloilo City with three terminal hubs at the new Ceres Terminal, Brgy. Balantang, Jaro, Iloilo City, Iloilo – Antique Bus Terminal at San Pedro St, Molo, Iloilo City and Festive Walk Transport Terminal, Iloilo Business Park, Mandurriao, Iloilo City. The base is assigned as Base 6 of Yanson Group of Bus Companies. Their routes are from the cities of Iloilo and Roxas to the rest of Western Visayas.

Northern lines: From Ceres Terminal, Jaro, Iloilo City

- Iloilo City – Barotac Viejo
- Iloilo City – Concepcion via Sara/Ajuy
- Iloilo City - San Dionisio via Ajuy/Sara/Concepcion
- Iloilo City – Balasan
- Iloilo City – Estancia via Balasan
- Iloilo City – Carles

Central lines: via Passi City (From Ceres Terminal, Jaro, Iloilo City)

- Iloilo City – Passi
- Iloilo City – Calinog via Passi City
- Iloilo City – Roxas City via Passi City
- Iloilo City – Kalibo via Passi City
- Iloilo City – Caticlan via Kalibo

Central lines: From Festive Walk Transport Terminal, Iloilo Business Park, Mandurriao, Iloilo City

- Iloilo City – Kalibo International Airport
- Iloilo City – Caticlan Airport via Kalibo
- Iloilo City – Iloilo International Airport

Central lines: From Pavia Transport Terminal, Pavia, Iloilo

- Iloilo City – Roxas City via Calinog, Tapaz, Dumalag
- Iloilo City – Kalibo via Calinog/Tapaz/Jamindan
- Iloilo City – Jamindan via Calinog/Tapaz
- Iloilo City – Tapaz via Calinog

Antique lines: From San Pedro, Molo Terminal, Iloilo City(Until 2020). / Ceres Terminal Antique Bound,Mohon,Iloilo City(2022-Now)

- Iloilo City - San Remigio via San Jose
- Iloilo City - San Joaquin
- Iloilo City – Caticlan via San Jose
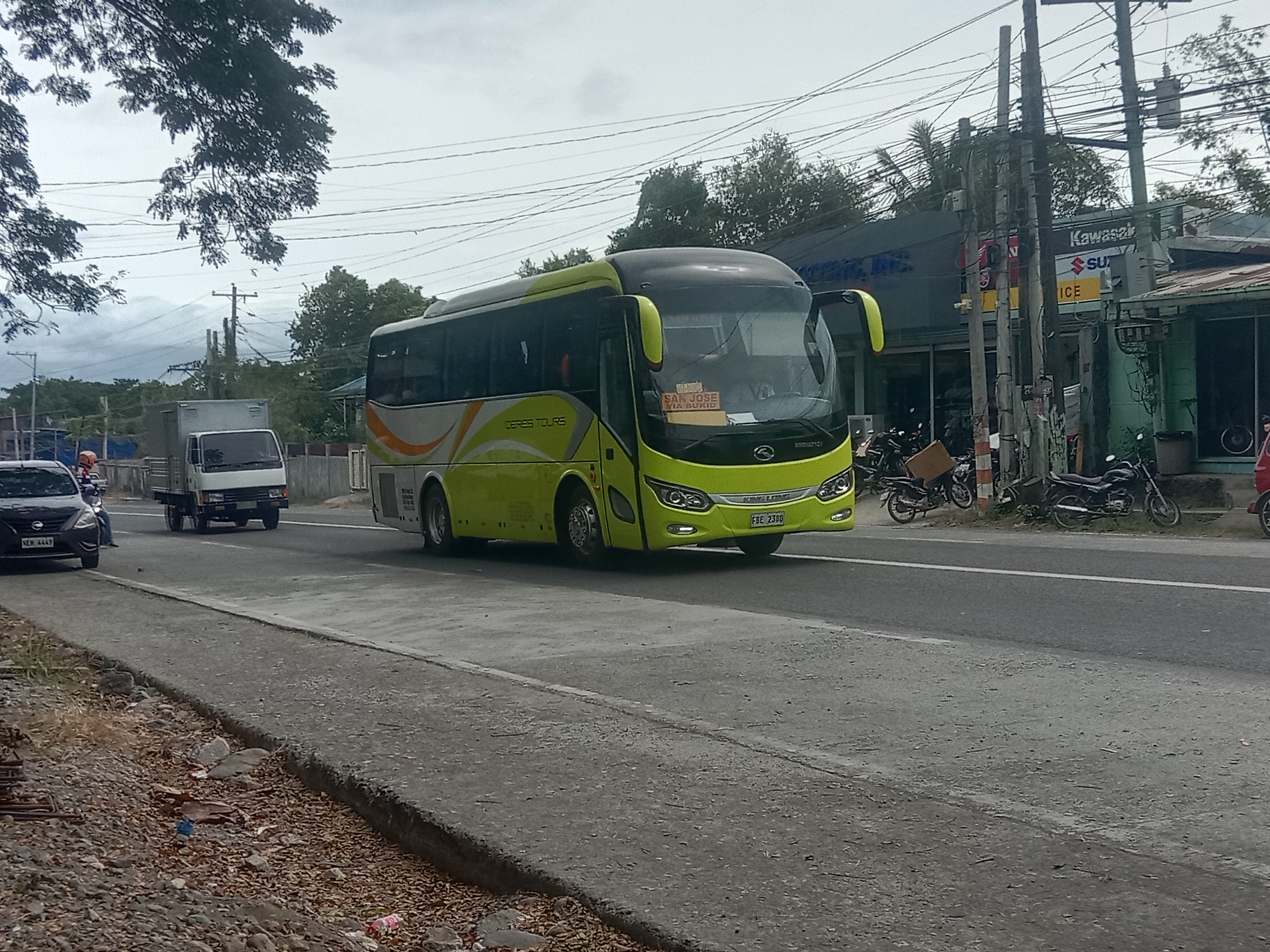
  Ceres Tours 69004 Going to San Jose via Bukid
- Iloilo City – Kalibo via San Jose/Culasi/Pandan/Libertad
- Iloilo City – Culasi
- Iloilo City – Pandan
- Iloilo City – Libertad
- Iloilo City – Bugasong
- Iloilo City – San Jose via Tobias Fornier/Anini-y/Casay
- Iloilo City – Dao via Anini-y

Loop Service: Plying Roxas City-Estancia

- Roxas City – Estancia
- Roxas City – Balasan via President Roxas/Pilar

Loop Service: Kalibo

- Kalibo – Caticlan
- Kalibo – Roxas City via Sapian
- Kalibo – Sara via Roxas City/Passi/San Rafael

=== Dumaguete Base ===
Dumaguete Base is located at Calindagan Road, Dumaguete with its terminal hub at the same location. The base is assigned as Base 7 of the Yanson Group of Bus Companies. Their routes are from Dumaguete to the rest of the Negros Island Region, Cebu, Bohol, Western Visayas and Zamboanga City.

- Dumaguete – Cebu City via Bato/Oslob
- Dumaguete - Cebu City via Bato-Barili
- Dumaguete – Bacolod via Kabankalan/Mabinay
- Dumaguete – Bacolod via San Carlos
- Dumaguete – Bayawan
- Dumaguete – Bayawan via Pamplona
- Dumaguete – Kalumboyan via Bayawan
- Dumaguete – Banay-Banay via Bayawan
- Dumaguete – Mandu-ao via Bayawan
- Dumaguete – Bantayan via Bayawan
- Dumaguete – Dawis via Bayawan
- Dumaguete – Tayawan via Bayawan
- Dumaguete – San Jose via Bayawan
- Dumaguete – Siaton via Mayabon/Si-it/Bonbonon/Malabuhan
- Dumaguete – Tanjay/Pamplona
- Dumaguete – Bais
- Dumaguete – Mabinay
- Dumaguete – Mabinay via Dawis
- Dumaguete – Baras via Mabinay
- Dumaguete – Tara via Mabinay
- Dumaguete – Manjuyod
- Dumaguete – Ayungon
- Dumaguete – Tambo via Ayungon
- Dumaguete – Bago via Ayungon
- Dumaguete – Jimalalud
- Dumaguete – Owacan via Jimalalud
- Dumaguete – Bagtic via La Libertad/Pacuan
- Dumaguete – Guihulngan
- Dumaguete – Trinidad via Guihulngan
- Dumaguete – Canlaon
- Dumaguete – San Carlos City
- Dumaguete – Hinoba-an
- Dumaguete – Sipalay
- Dumaguete – Cubao via Mabinay/Kabankalan City/Bacolod (Operated by Ceres Transport)
- Dumaguete – Cubao via Guihulngan/San Carlos/Bacolod (Operated by Ceres Transport)
- Dumaguete – Pasay Terminal/PITX, Parañaque via Mabinay/Kabankalan City/Bacolod/Iloilo/Kalibo/Caticlan/Mindoro/Batangas Port (Operated by Ceres Transport)
- Bayawan – Cebu City via Dumaguete
- Bayawan – Mabinay via Dumaguete
- Sipalay – Cebu City via Dumaguete
- Dumaguete – Ubay, Bohol via Taloot/Loon & Tagbilaran City, Bohol

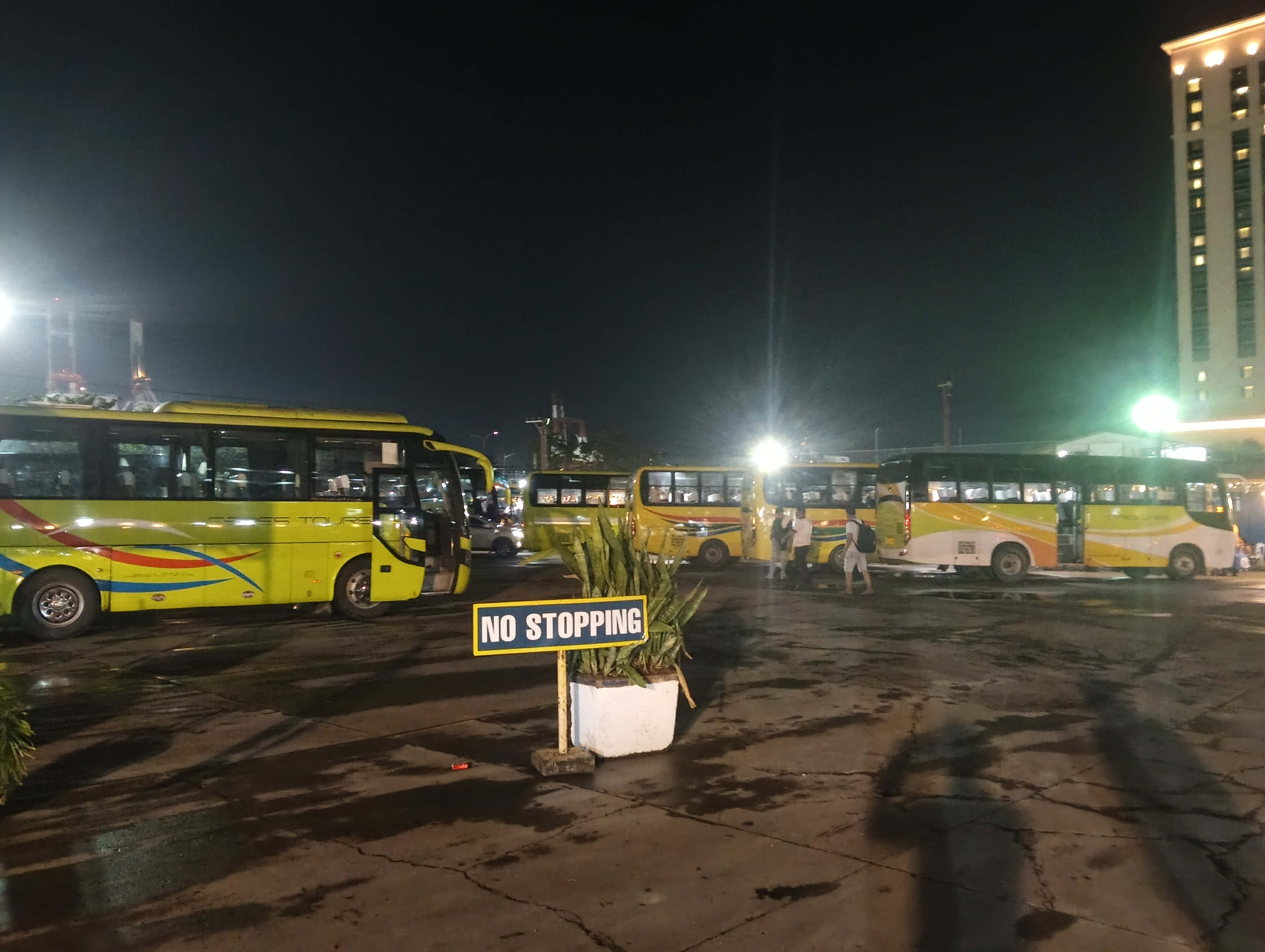
A fleet of Vallacar Transit Incorporated at Cebu North Bus Terminal

=== Cebu Base ===
Cebu Base is located at Rizal Ave. Ext., Cebu City and Ouano Ave., Mandaue City with three terminal hubs at Cebu North Bus Terminal at SM City Cebu, Cebu South Bus Terminal at N. Bacalso Avenue of Cebu City, and the Ayala Malls Central Bloc terminal located in Cebu IT Park, Cebu City. The base is assigned as Base 8 of Yanson Group of Bus Companies. Their routes are from Cebu City to the rest of Metro Cebu, Central Visayas, Eastern Visayas, Zamboanga del Norte and Zamboanga City.

Northern lines: From Cebu North Bus Terminal, SM City Cebu, North Reclamation Area, Cebu City

- Cebu City – Maya (Daanbantayan) via Bagay
- Cebu City – Maya (Daanbantayan) via Kawit
- Cebu City – Daanbantayan via Kawit
- Cebu City – Bogo City
- Cebu City – Tacloban City via Bogo/Palompon Port
- Cebu City – San Isidro via Bogo/Palompon Port
- Cebu City - Naval via Bogo/Palompon Port
- Cebu City – Hagnaya (San Remigio) via Bogo
- Cebu City – Lambusan (San Remigio) via Hagnaya/Bogo
- Cebu City – Bantayan via Santa Fe/Hagnaya Port
- Cebu City – Madridejos via Bantayan/Santa Fe/Hagnaya Port
- Cebu City – Tabogon via Borbon
- Cebu City – Tuburan via Tabuelan
- Cebu City – Cubao via Danao/Tabuelan/Escalante/Bacolod/Iloilo/Kalibo/Caticlan/Batangas Port (Operated by Ceres Transport)

Southern lines: From Cebu South Bus Terminal, N. Bacalso Ave. Cebu City

- Cebu City – Bato (Samboan) via Oslob/Liloan Port/Santander (Loop service, operated by Ceres Liner and Sugbo Urban)
- Cebu City – Malabuyoc via Oslob/Santander/Samboan/Ginatilan
- Cebu City – Bato (Samboan) via Barili/Dumanjug/Ronda/Alcantara/Moalboal (Loop Service, operated by Ceres Liner and Sugbo Urban)
- Cebu City – Alcoy
- Cebu City – Carcar
- Cebu City – Argao
- Cebu City – Anajao (Argao) via Talo-ot
- Cebu City – Moalboal
- Cebu City – Zamboanga City via Bato/Dipolog City/Dapitan City Port
- Cebu City – Simala (Sibonga)
- Cebu City – Siquijor via Oslob/Liloan Port (operated by Sugbo Urban)
- Cebu City – Kabankalan via Tampi (Amlan)/Mabinay
- Cebu City – Kabankalan via Bulado (Guihulngan)/Mabinay

Central-Western lines: From Cebu South Bus Terminal, N. Bacalso Ave. Cebu City

- Cebu City – Pinamungajan via Toledo City (Operated by Ceres Liner and Sugbo)
- Cebu City – Aloguinsan via Toledo City/Pinamungajan

Metro Cebu Lines:

- Cebu IT Park – Danao via Mabolo/Maguikay/Consolacion/Liloan/Compostela
- Cebu IT Park – Mactan Newtown (Lapu-Lapu City) via Banilad/Cabangcalan/Maguikay/Pacific Mall/Marina Mall/MEPZ 1
- Cebu IT Park – MEPZ 1 (Lapu-Lapu City) via Mabolo/Subangdaku/Maguikay (Operated by Sugbo Urban, Modern jeepney type)
- Cebu IT Park – Cordova via Mabolo/Subangdaku/Maguikay/Opon/Babag (Operated by Sugbo Urban, Modern jeepney type)
- Cebu IT Park - Il Corso via SM Seaside/N. Bacalso/Fuente Osmeña/Ayala (Operated by CIBUS)
- Parkmall (Mandaue City) – Tintay Public Market (Talamban, Cebu City) via Cabancalan/Maguikay/Guizo/Mantuyong/Centro/Ibabao Estancia/Pacific Mall/Basak/Canduman (Operated by Ceres Liner, Modern jeepney type)

== Fleet ==
Vallacar Transit Incorporated has several units from Chinese brand buses. Some of their fleets are also provided by their parent company's coach building division, Vallacar Transit Incorporated – Transport Engineering and Bus Body Assembly Plant (VTI-TEBBAP).

=== Airconditioned units ===
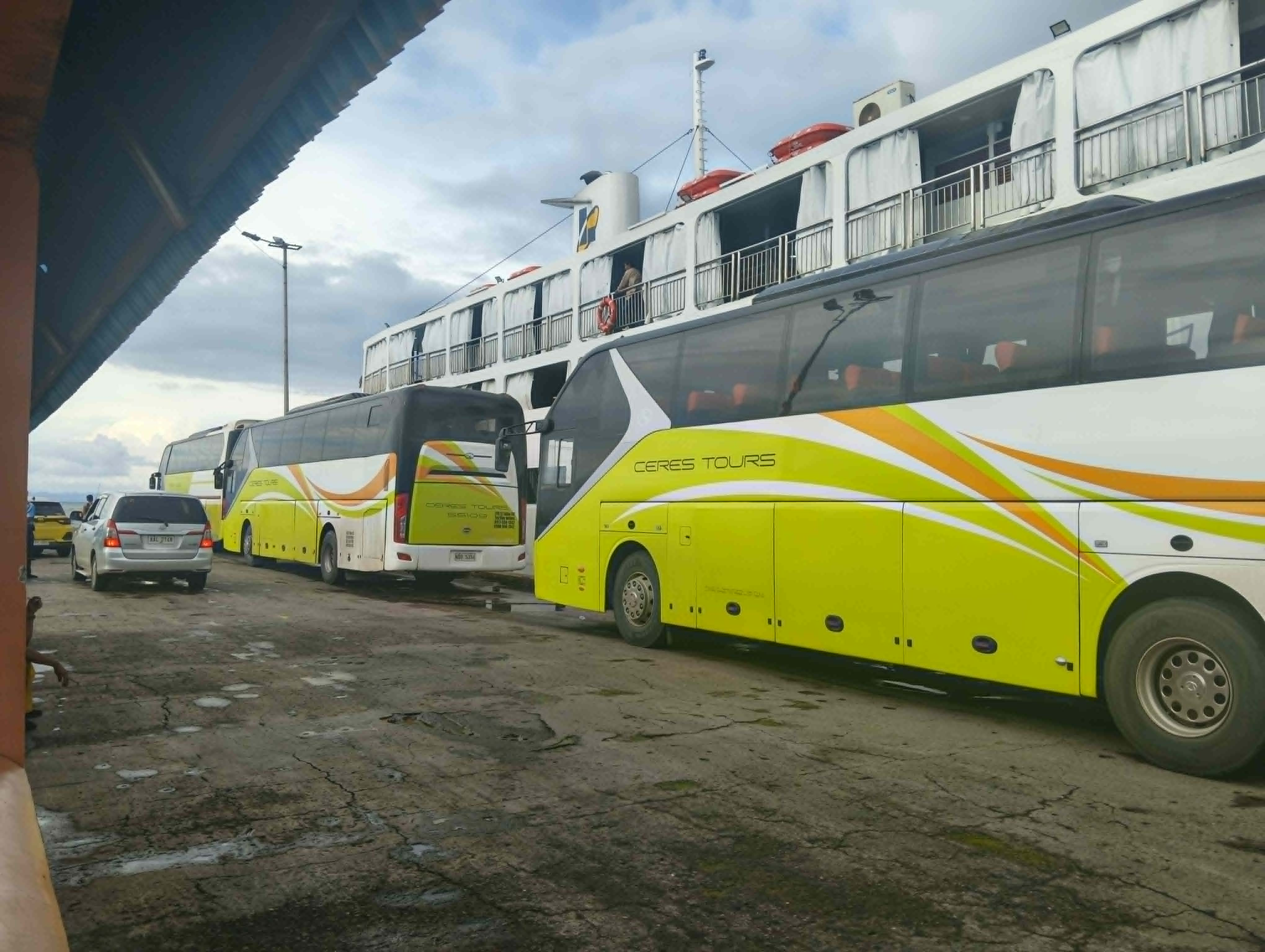
A fleet of Vallacar Transit bus units at the Port of Toledo

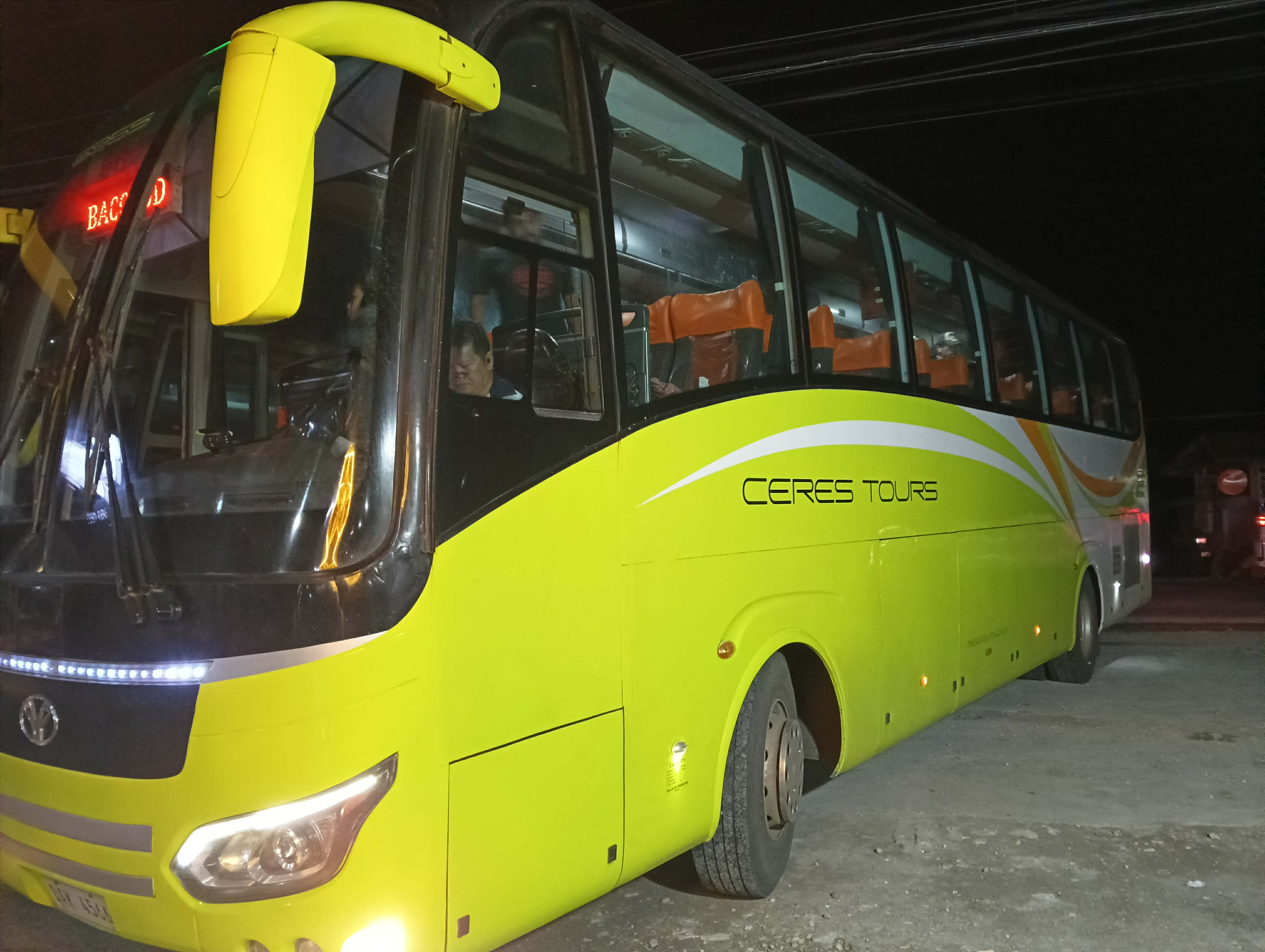
A Yanson Viking Series 11th Generation bus unit

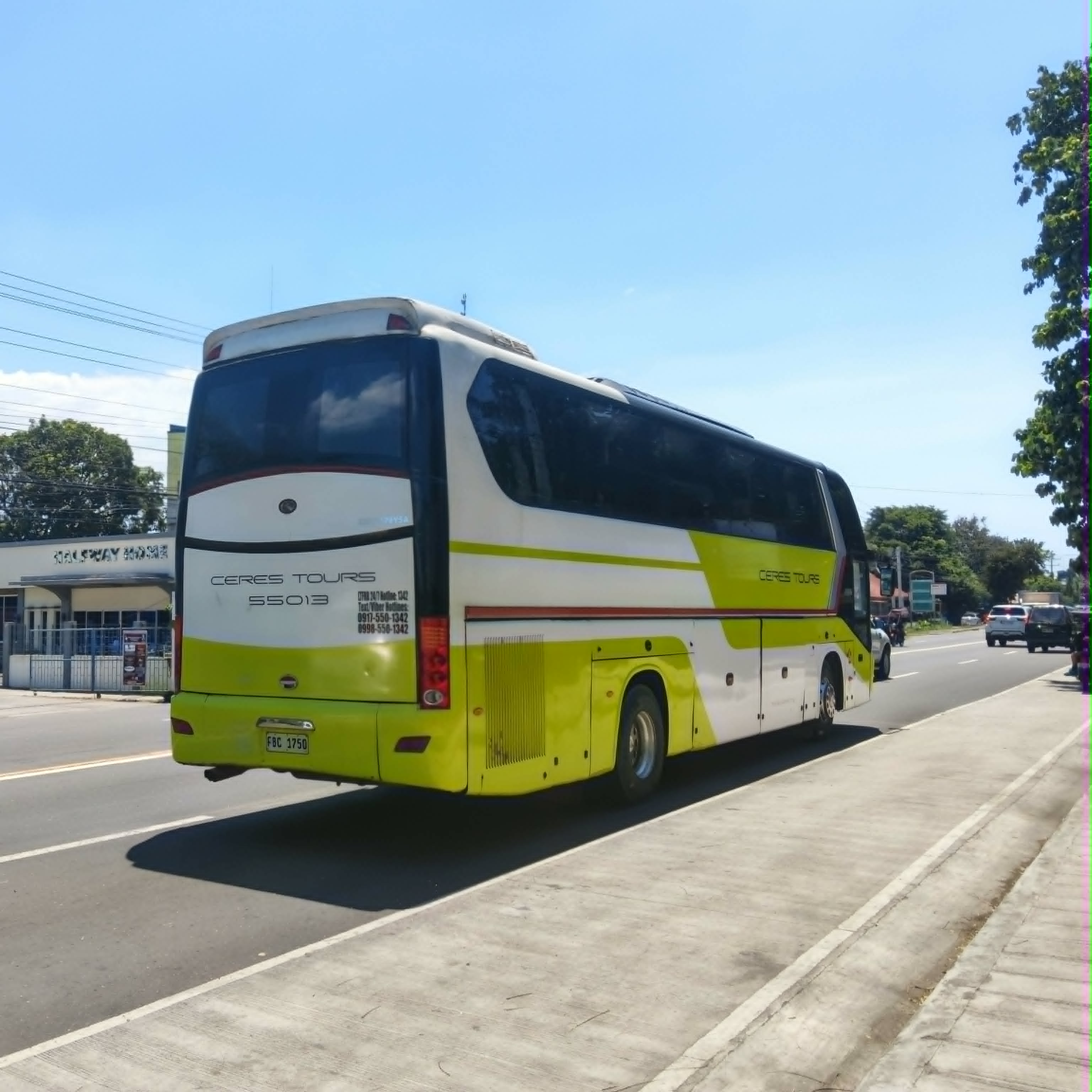
King Long XMQ6129Y5A bus

- Viking (Built in-house, exclusive, 11 generations so far.)
- Yanson Legacy II (Built in-house, exclusive, less than 10 active)
- Yutong ZK6858H9
- Yutong ZK6827H/HYG
- Yutong ZK6876H/HYG
- Yutong ZK6117HYG
- Yutong ZK6119HYG
- Yutong ZK6127H
- Yutong ZK6127HA
- Yutong ZK6127HYG
- Yutong ZK6128HGE Low floor
- King Long XMQ6111Y
- King Long XMQ6119T
- King Long XMQ6119T with modified fascia (Yanson ViKing 10th Generation/ 8th Generation)
- King Long XMQ6127G Low floor
- King Long XMQ6129Y5A
- King Long XMQ6129Y5
- King Long XMQ6129Y
- King Long XMQ6871CY
- King Long XMQ6821CY
- King Long XMQ6111CY
- King Long XMQ6125AY
- King Long XMQ6128AYW
- King Long XMQ6668AYD5D1 (Modern jeepney type)
- Higer KLQ6118HKQE2A
- Higer KLQ6129G
- Hino XZU730L-B (Two variants, aircon and ordinary)
- Hino XZU342LJ PUV Class II (Modern jeepney type)
- Hino XZU342LN PUV Class III (Modern jeepney type)
- Zhongtong LCK6108H (Service bus)
- Zhongtong LCK6935H (Service bus)

=== Ordinary fare units ===
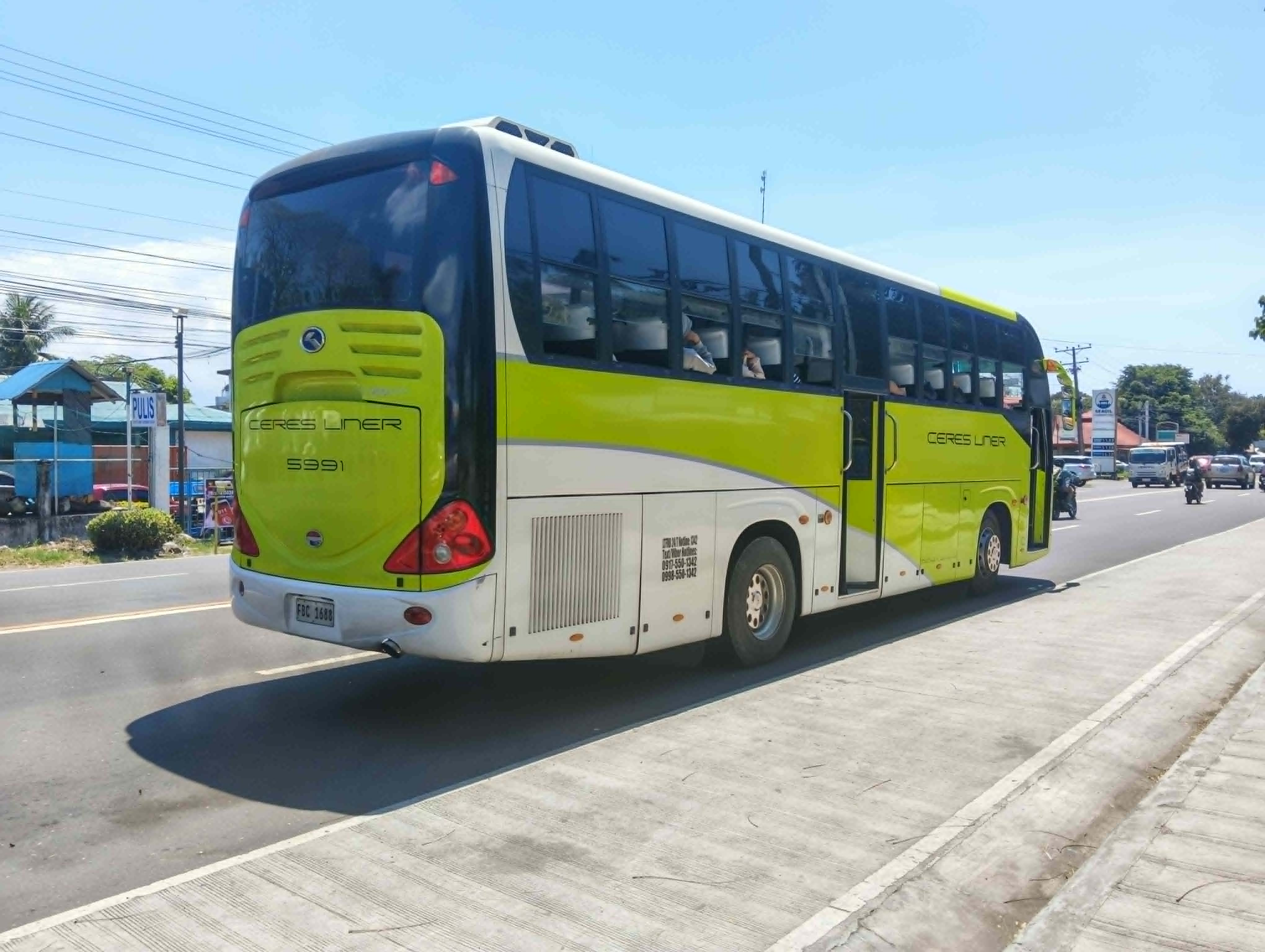
King Long XMQ6107Y bus

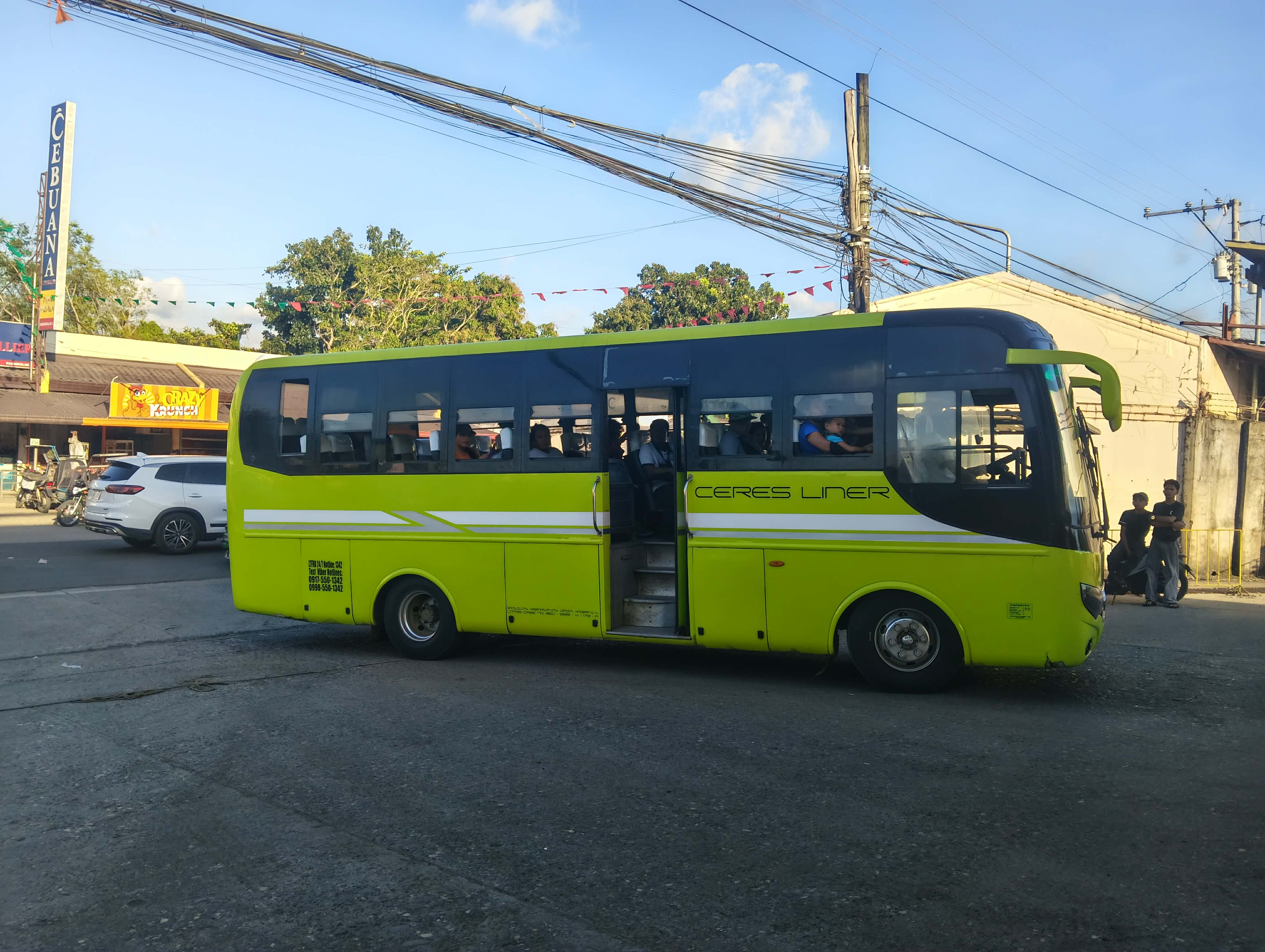
Hino FB4J bus unit

- Yanson FB4J 2025 Superstar “Legacy”
- Yanson FB4J 2023 "4th Generation" Skylander
- Yanson FB4J Crius
- Yanson FB4J Catseye
- Yanson Crius Hino Motors RK1JMT
- Yanson Crius Hino Motors RK8JSUA/RK8JMUA
- Yutong ZK6827H/HYG
- King Long XMQ6859Y
- King Long XMQ6871CY
- King Long XMQ6821CY
- King Long XMQ6107AYW
- Hino XZU730L-B (Two variants, aircon and ordinary)
- Santarosa PKB212 (Service bus)

== Subsidiaries ==
These are the subsidiary companies under the parent Yanson Group of Bus Companies (YGBC) owned by the Yanson family of Negros Occidental as of 2016 operating in Luzon, Visayas and Mindanao making it one of the biggest bus conglomerates in Southeast Asia.

=== Rural Transit of Mindanao Incorporated / Bachelor Express Incorporated ===
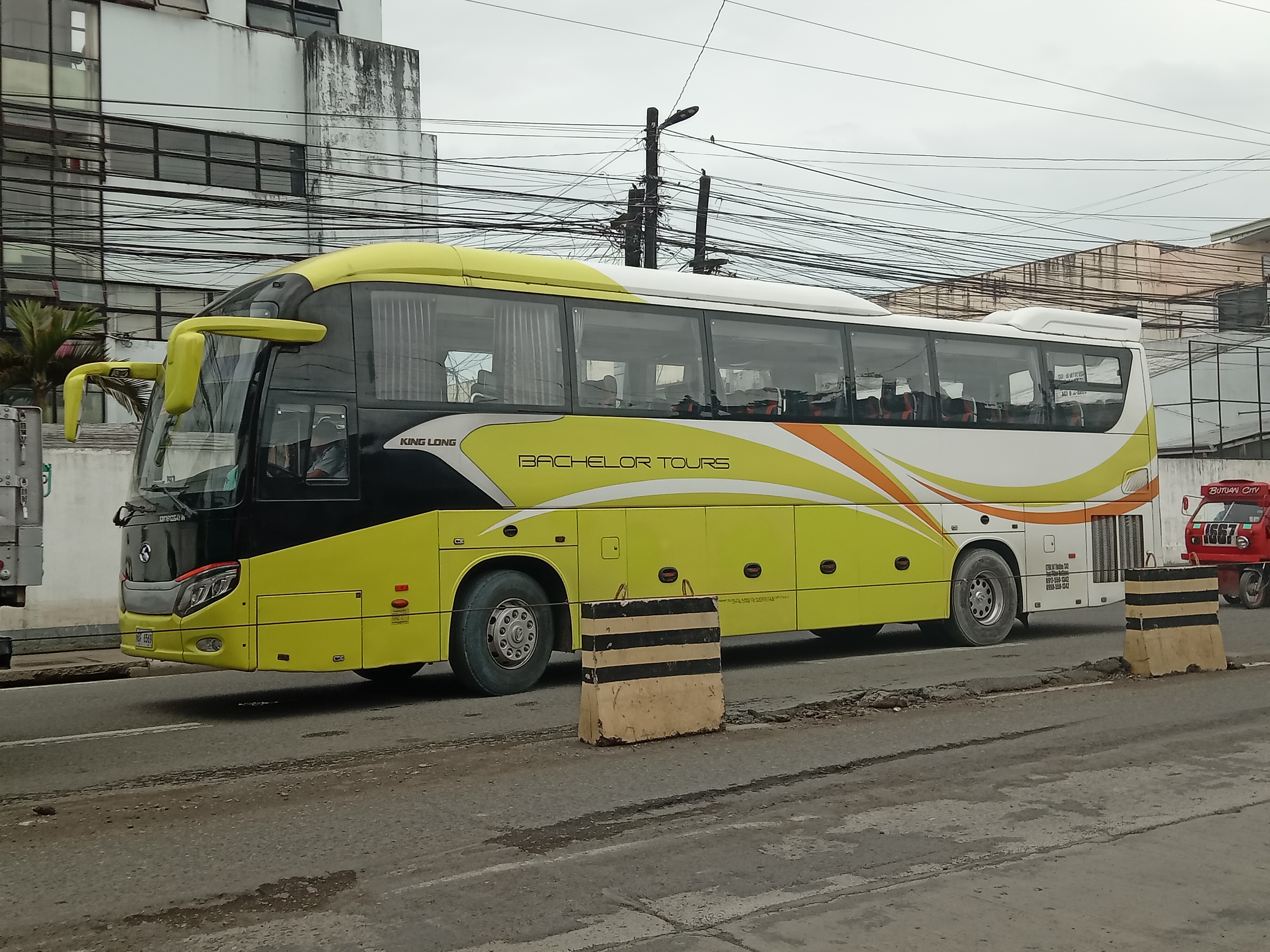
Bachelor Tours

In 1981, the Yansons ventured to Mindanao. They bought out Fortune Express and Bachelor Express, both Cagayan de Oro-based bus companies in 1985 and formed Rural Transit of Mindanao. However, the formation of Rural Transit was divided from Bachelor Express when the former owners of Bachelor and Yanson Group agreed to retain the name Bachelor Express as one of the conditions of the contract of sale. Bachelor Express then retained the name Bachelor Express.

In 2005, they bought out Lilian Express Inc. and sister company Mary May Express, its fiercest business rival, and became the dominant transit company in the island of Mindanao. This expanded their operations to the whole Western Mindanao, making Rural Transit as the predominant transport operator in the Mindanao Region. In 2013, Bachelor Express bought the CC JRC Liner company, which centered around Sto. Tomas, Davao Del Norte at the time, and made mixed services with Bachelor Express Inc.

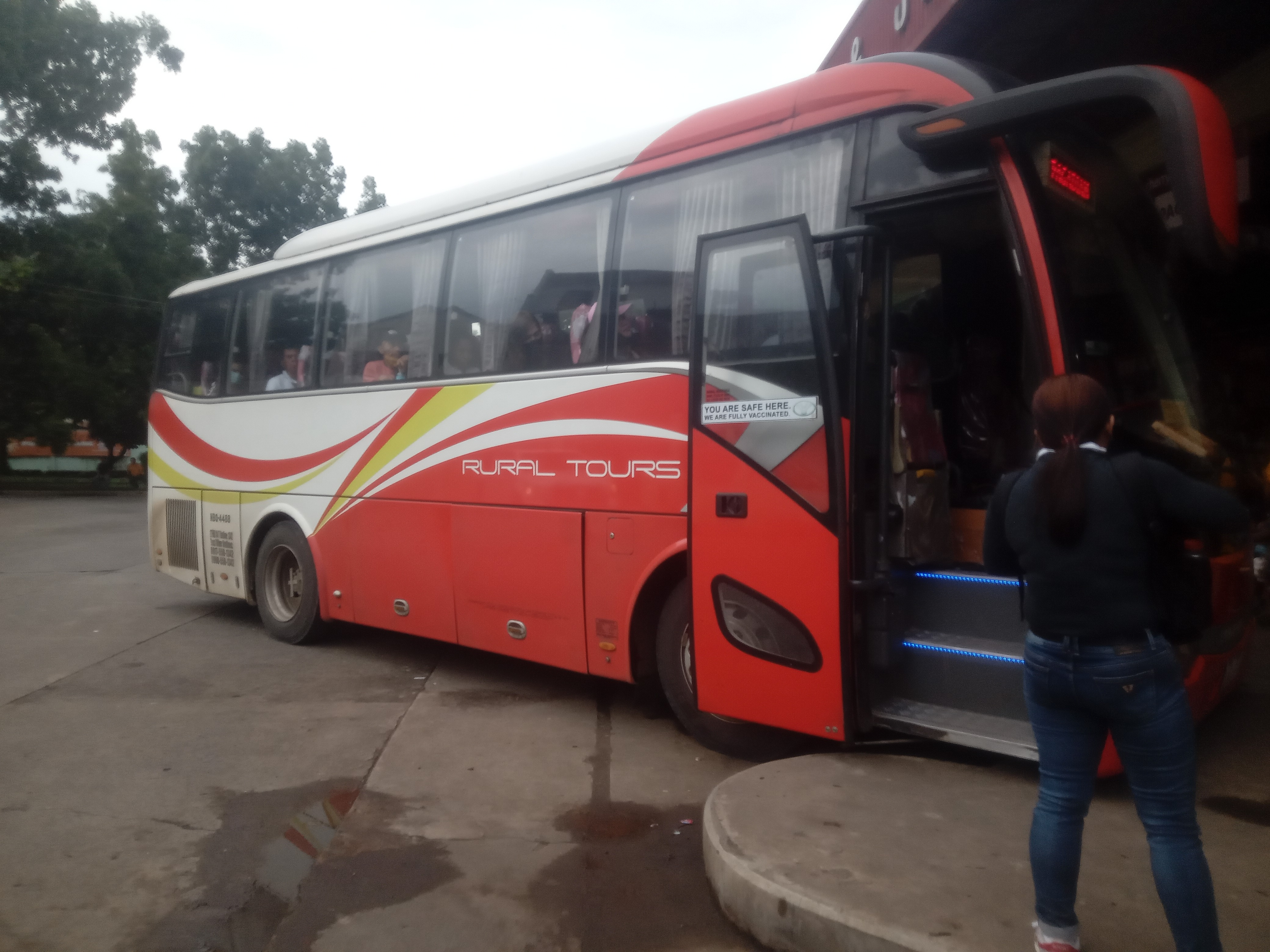
Rural Tours with its new livery

Bus Brands under Rural Transit Mindanao Incorporated / Bachelor Express Incorporated:

- Rural Transit
- Rural Tours
- Bachelor Express
- Bachelor Tours

=== Ceres Transport Incorporated (CTI) / Gold Star Bus Transit Incorporated ===
In 2007, Ceres Liner's Iloilo base pioneered travel between Iloilo City and Metro Manila through the Western Nautical Highway. Proving to be profitable, Yanson Group expanded its Metro Manila operations and established Ceres Transport in 2009, being based in Batangas City. It enabled bus services encompassing Cubao, Batangas City, Mindoro, Aklan, Antique Iloilo, Bacolod and Dumaguete.

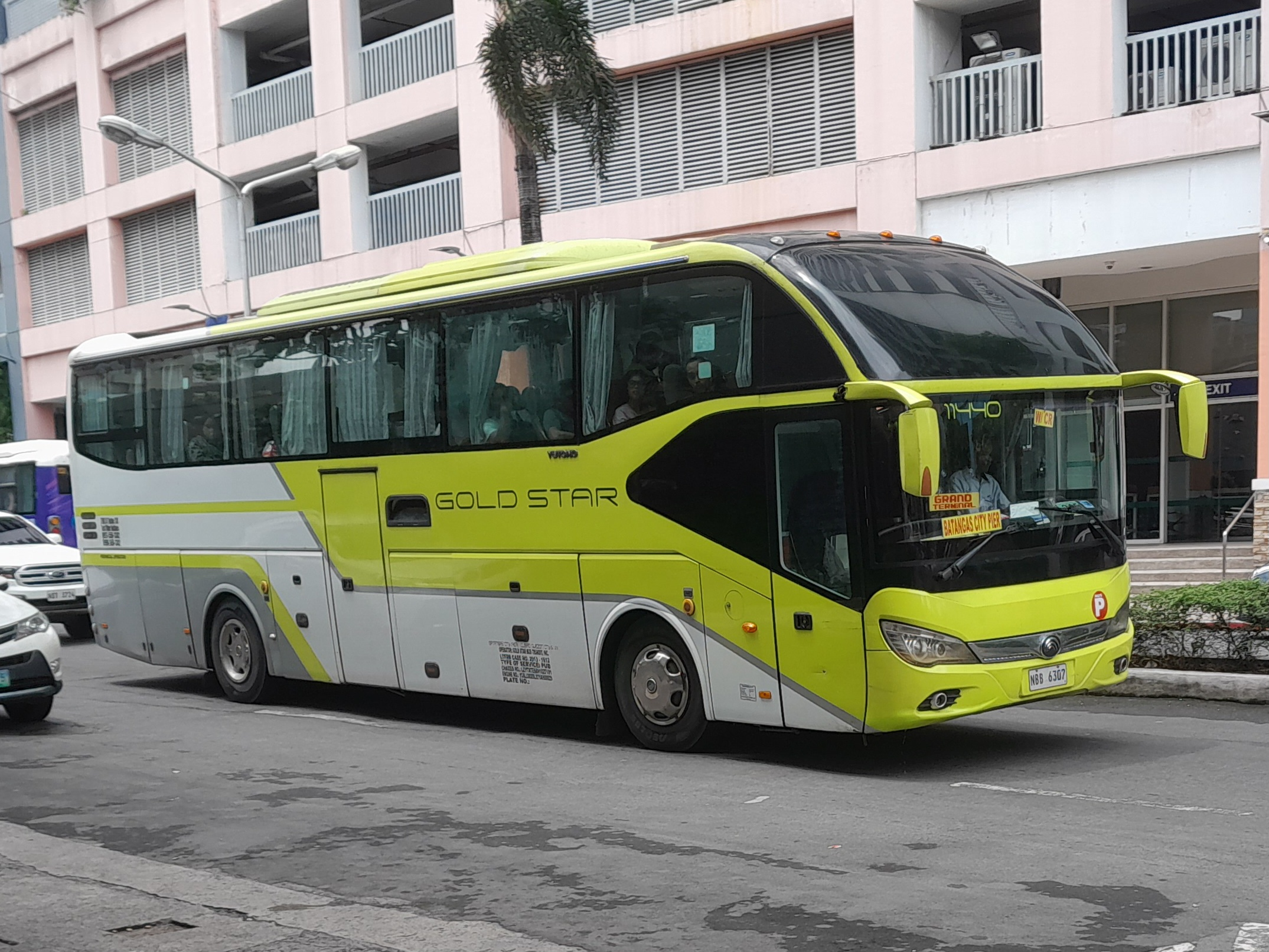
A Gold Star bus in Araneta City, en route to Batangas City

In 2012, Ceres Transport Inc. bought out a franchise of Gold Star Bus Company and allowed it to operate its Batangas-Cubao and Batangas-Alabang routes. Later on, Yanson Group decided to create its own subsidiary as Gold Star Bus Transit Incorporated, making it apart from the Ceres Transport Inc., which, back then, was the first bus company to have an Inter-Island route via RoRo Ferry services.

Bus brand under this company:

- Ceres Transport
- Gold Star

=== Southern Star Bus Transit Incorporated ===
In 2011, the conglomerate bought out St. Jude Transportation Company, a bus line based in Bohol, and renamed it Southern Star. Primarily, it was operated under the management of Vallacar Transit Incorporated. Later on, Southern Star formed its own subsidiary as Southern Star Bus Transit Incorporated.

Bus brand under this company:

- Southern Star

=== Mindanao Star Bus Transport Incorporated ===
Mindanao Star started in January 2015 when Bachelor Express bought out Weena Express and sister company People's Transport Corporation. It then formed a new subsidiary as Mindanao Star Bus Transport Incorporated, making them apart from the management of Bachelor Express. It opened opportunity for Yanson Group to serve the Davao City – Cotabato City route, which they cannot penetrate for decades. In 2016, they bought the Island City Express.

In October 2015, Mindanao Star bought Holiday Bus, the bus line of Davao Holiday Transport Services Inc., It made them to expand their operations for Davao City – General Santos – Koronadal route.

The stockholders of Mindanao Star Bus Transport, Inc., a sister company of Vallacar Transit Inc., re-appointed Leo Rey Yanson as president.

== See also ==
- Ceres Transport
- Mindanao Star
- List of bus companies of the Philippines
