= Lilian Express =

Philippines-based bus company

Lillian Express Inc.
- Founded: 1962; 63 years ago
- Defunct: 2005; 20 years ago (Sold to Yanson Group of Bus Companies)
- Headquarters: Dipolog, Philippines
- Service area: Mindanao
- Service type: Provincial Operation
- Alliance: Mary May Express
- Destinations: Davao City; Butuan; Cagayan de Oro; Bukidnon; Pagadian; Ozamiz; Dipolog; Zamboanga City
- Hubs: Capitol Avenue, Dipolog; Osmena Street, Cagayan de Oro
- Fleet: 300+ Buses (Nissan-UD, Hino, Isuzu)
- Chief executive: Cecelia O. Barrios (President)

Lilian Express, Inc., was a bus company based in Dipolog in the Philippines. It served bus routes to the Zamboanga Peninsula.

Its buses and route network were merged with Rural Transit and Bachelor Express after it was bought out completely by the Yanson Group of Companies in 2005.

== History ==
Lilian Express' name was taken from the family matriarch Lillian Opulentisima-Young. It started its business operation in Dipolog in the early 1960s and eventually branched to Ozamiz, Pagadian and Zamboanga City.

In 1995, it expanded its bus transport service to the cities of Davao, Butuan, Cagayan de Oro, Iligan, Pagadian, and in the province of Bukidnon. Its sister company Mary May Express, runs Dipolog to Zamboanga City routes.

On March 5, 2005, the whole route network was bought out completely in by Yanson Group of Bus Companies, a Bacolod-based bus conglomerate, commencing from its Davao, Agusan, and Bukidnon route networks, then followed by Cagayan de Oro and Dipolog routes. Its last transport service to the public was made on April 30, 2005, on board an 8:00PM bus from Zamboanga City bound for Dipolog which arrived at 1:30AM the following day.

Its transport operations were merged with Rural Transit of Mindanao Inc., which resulted Yanson Group to form their company re-structure by having bases in key cities. The remaining facilities of Lilian Express became Rural Transit's Dipolog and Pagadian bases.

== Fleet ==
Majority of Lilian Express' fleet was locally manufactured in Zamboanga City. At that time, names local coach makers in Zamboanga City were unknown yet the demands of their manufacturing were high. In 2000, they started to acquire buses from Santarosa Philippines with their early models like Santarosa AKR and Minibuses.

- Santarosa Nissan Diesel Metrostar (CMF87L Chassis)
- Santarosa Nissan Diesel Exfoh FE6B (CPB87N Chassis)
- Santarosa Nissan Diesel FE6-B AKR 1994 Model (CMF87L Chassis)
- Santarosa Mitsubishi Fuso 8DC9 AKR
- Isuzu Forward (converted to passenger bus)
